= Foxcote =

Foxcote may refer to several places in England:

- Foxcote, Gloucestershire, a hamlet in Withington parish
- Foxcote, Somerset, a small village in Hemington parish
- another name for Foscott, Buckinghamshire
  - Foxcote Reservoir and Wood, Buckinghamshire
