= 15th Satellite Awards =

US awards ceremony for film and television

- Date: December 19, 2010

Highlights
- Best drama film: The Social Network
- Best comedy/musical film: Scott Pilgrim vs. the World
- Best television drama: Breaking Bad
- Best television musical/comedy: The Big C
- Best director: David Fincher for The Social Network

The 15th Satellite Awards is an award ceremony honoring the year's outstanding performers, films, television shows, home videos and interactive media, presented by the International Press Academy at the Hyatt Regency Century Plaza in Century City, Los Angeles.

The nominations were announced on December 1, 2010. The winners were announced on December 19, 2010.

== Special achievement awards ==
Auteur Award (for his work as a documentary film director and producer) – Alex Gibney

Humanitarian Award (for community involvement and work on social causes) – Connie Stevens

Mary Pickford Award (for outstanding contribution to the entertainment industry) – Vanessa Williams

Nikola Tesla Award (for his work as film preservationist and historian) – Robert A. Harris

== Motion picture winners and nominees ==
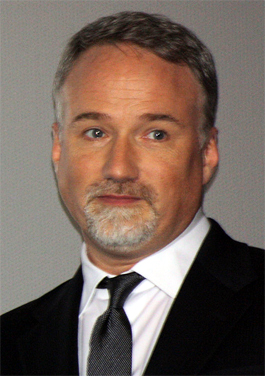
David Fincher, Best Director winner

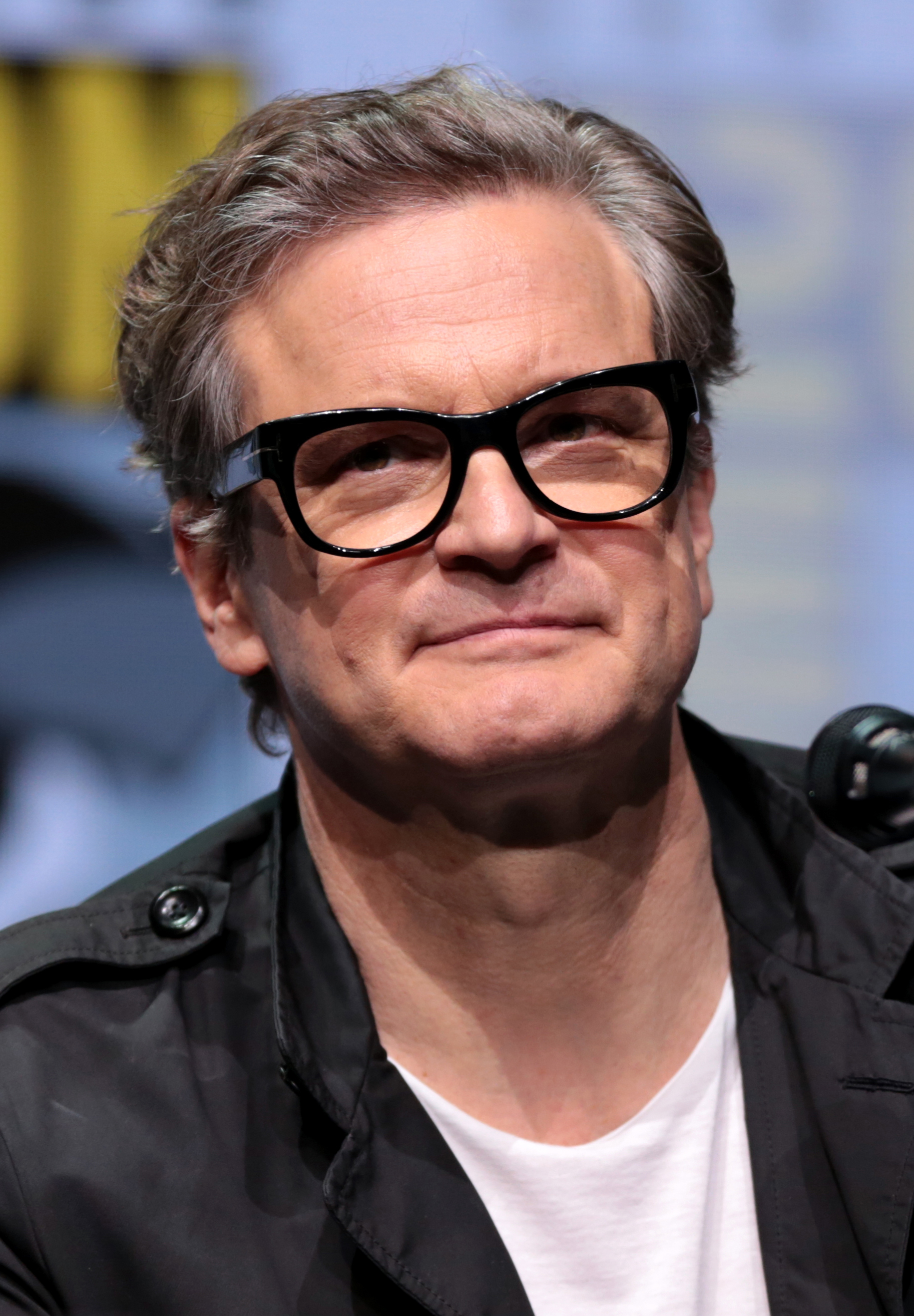
Colin Firth, Best Actor in a Motion Picture – Drama winner

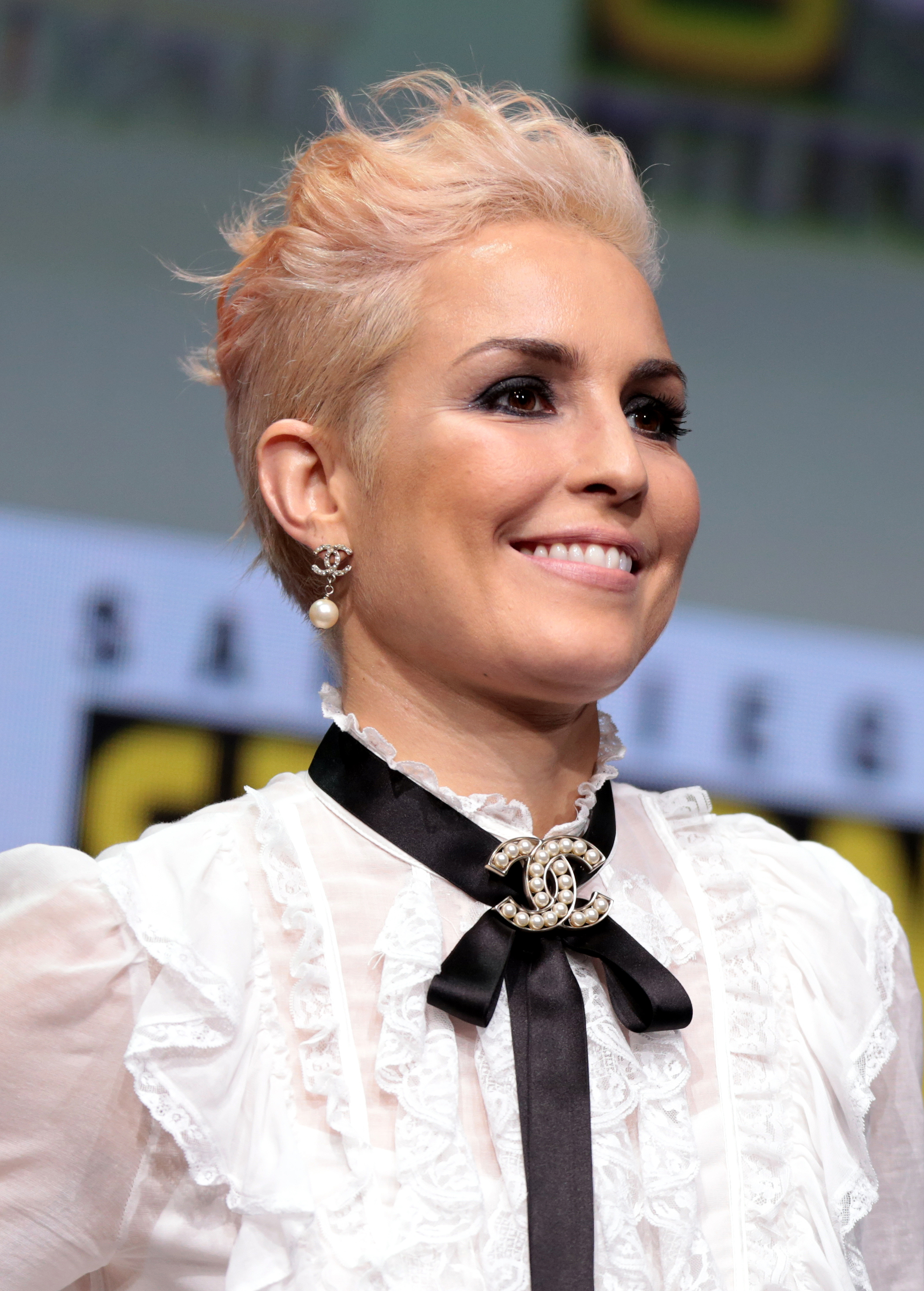
Noomi Rapace, Best Actress in a Motion Picture – Drama winner

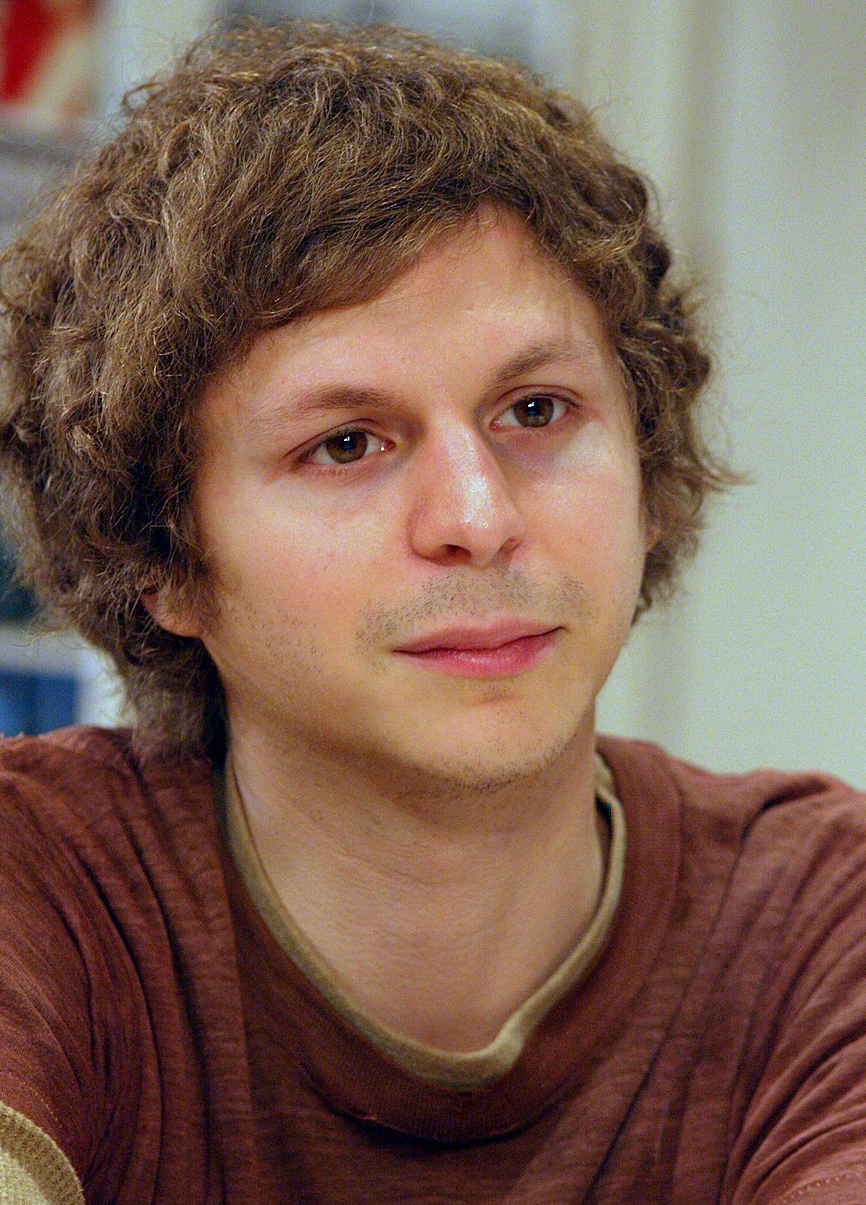
Michael Cera, Best Actor in a Motion Picture – Comedy or Musical winner

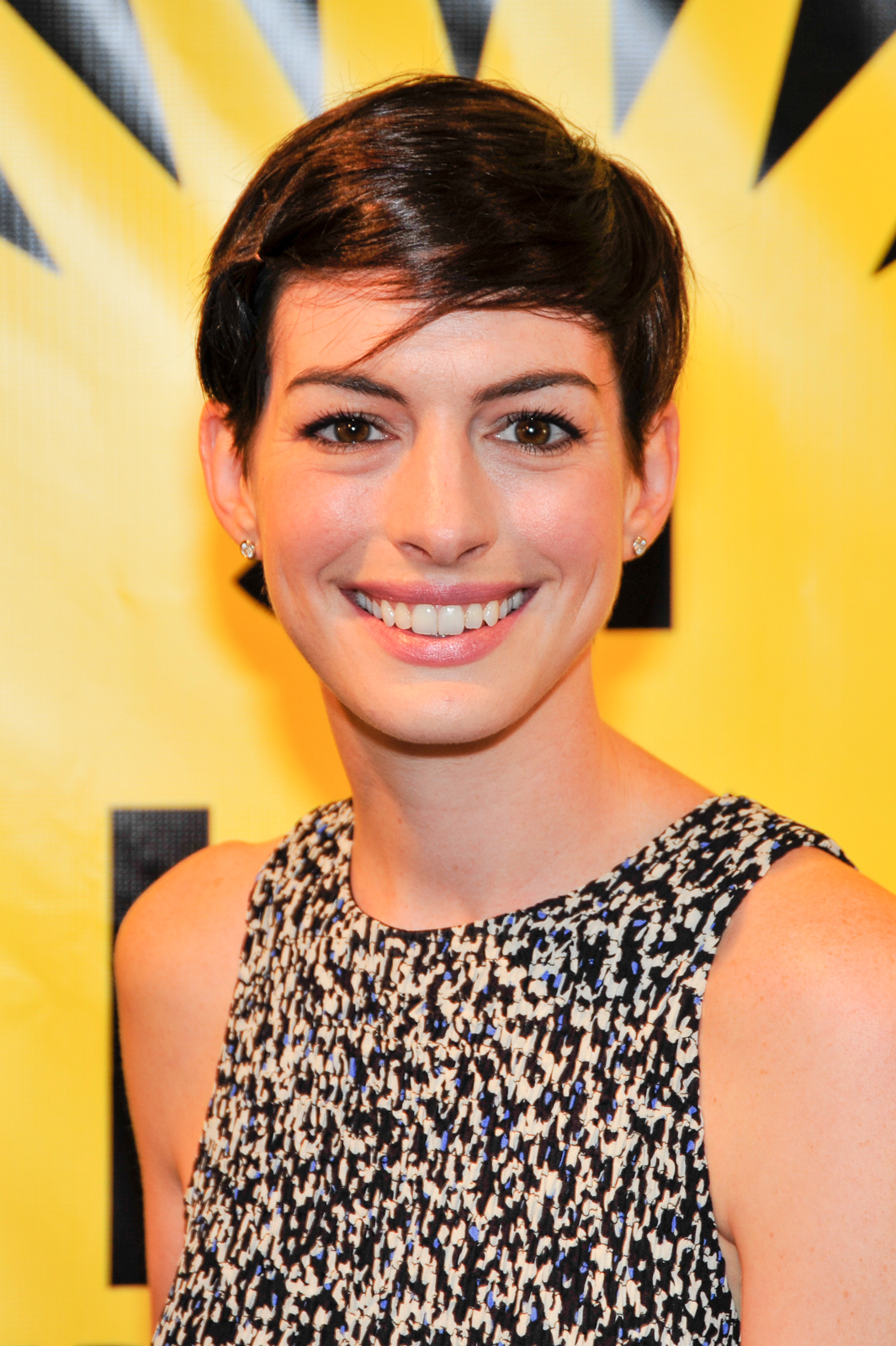
Anne Hathaway, Best Actress in a Motion Picture – Comedy or Musical winner

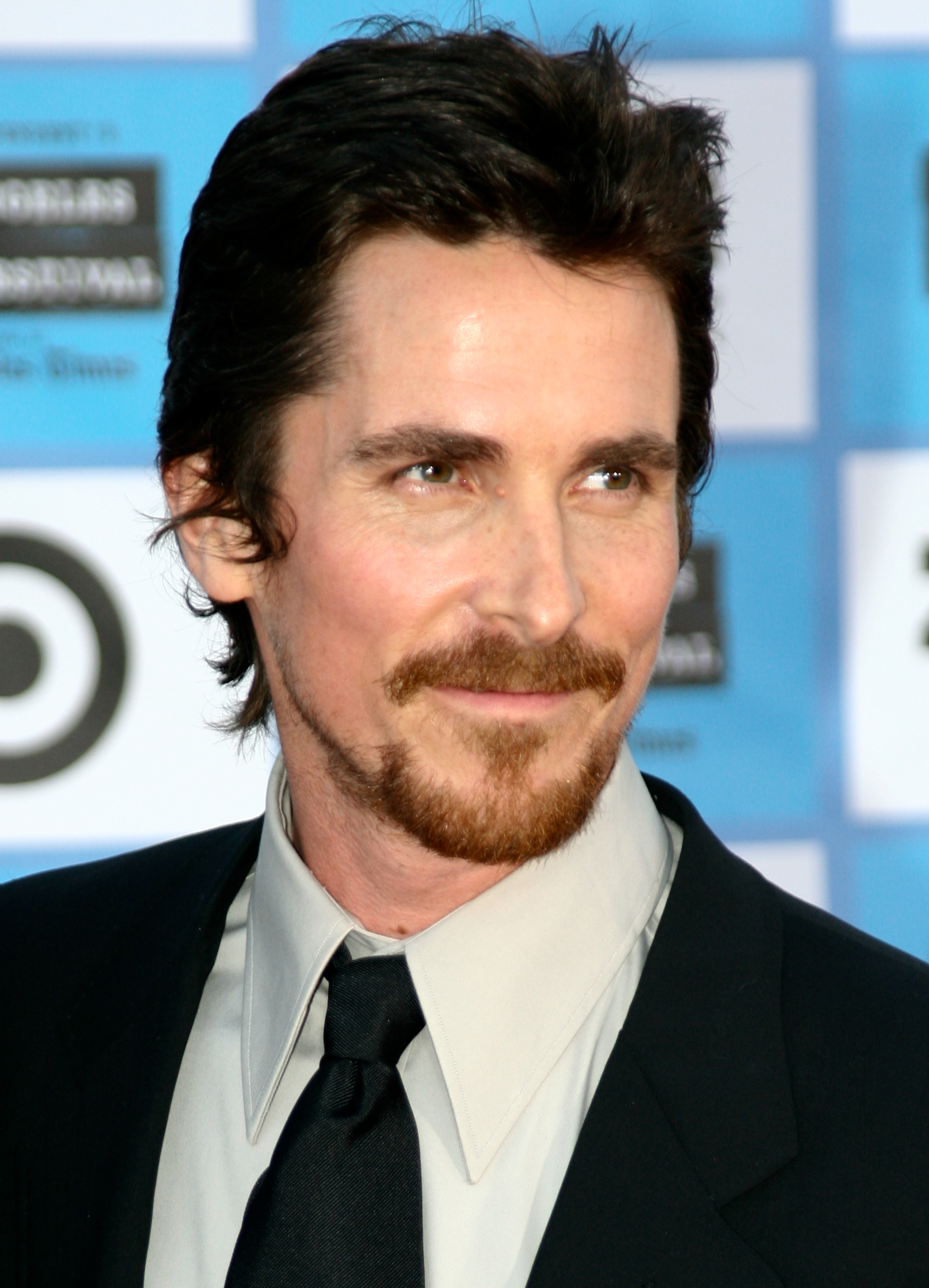
Christian Bale, Best Supporting Actor in a Motion Picture winner

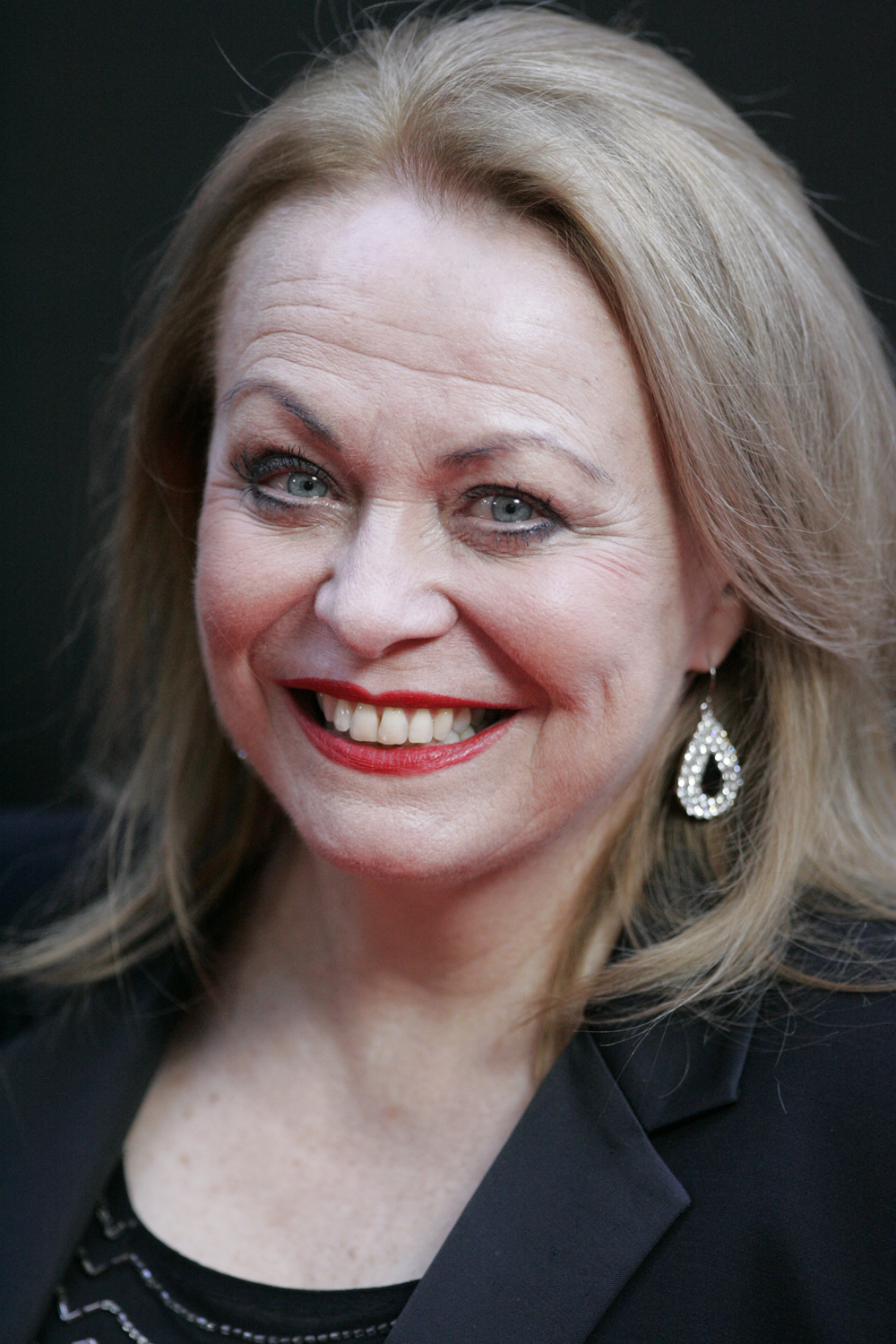
Jacki Weaver, Best Supporting Actress in a Motion Picture winner

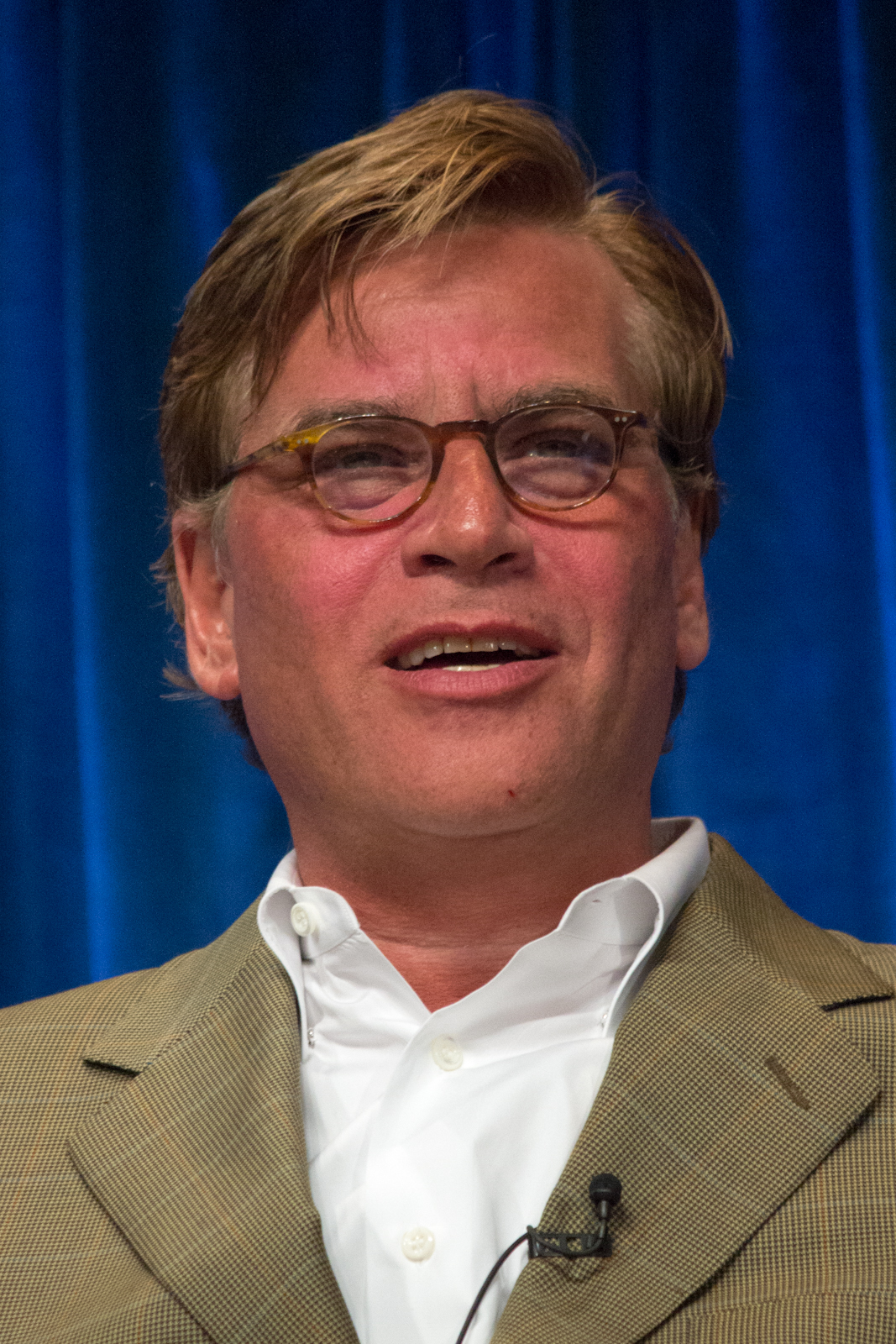
Aaron Sorkin, Best Adapted Screenplay winner

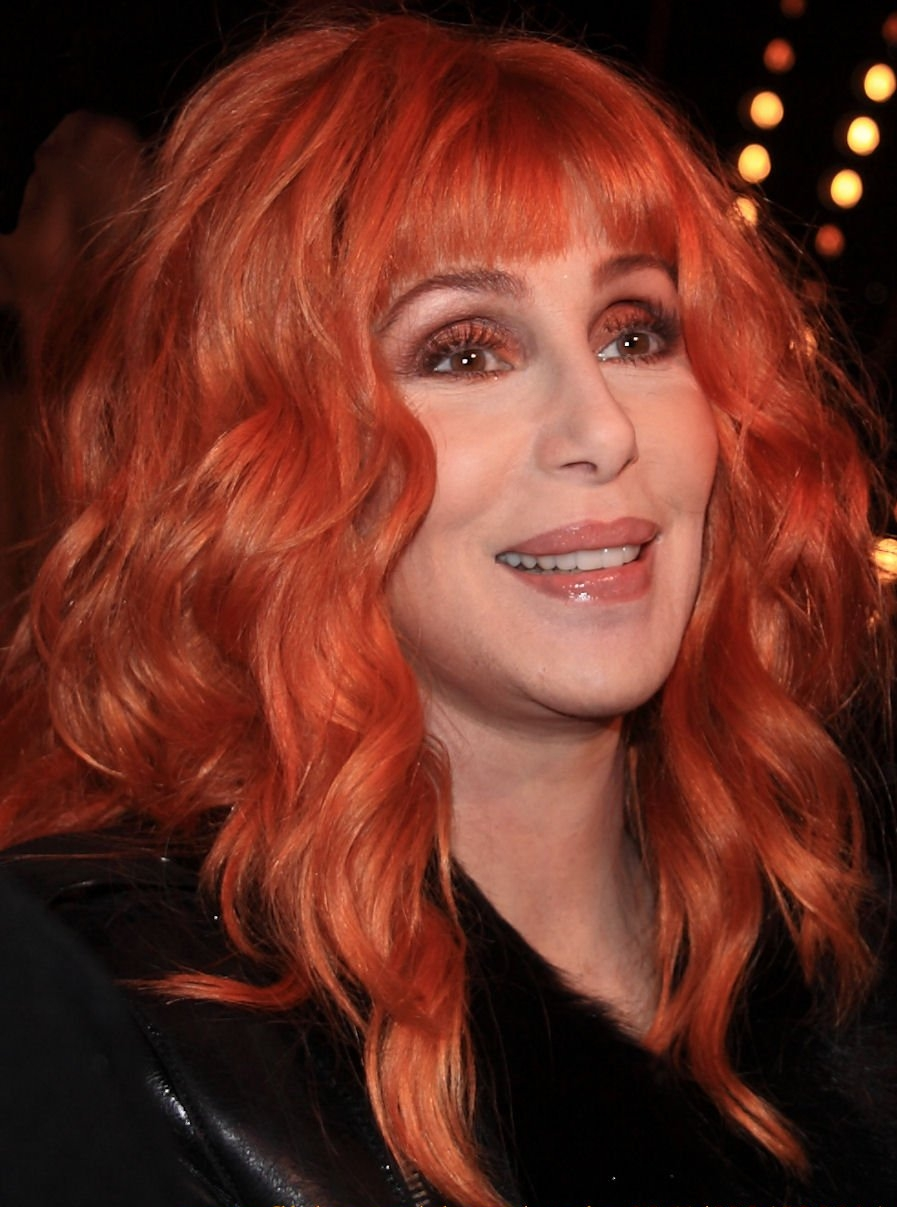
Cher, Best Original Song co-winner

=== Best Actor – Drama ===
- Colin Firth – The King's Speech
- Javier Bardem – Biutiful
- Leonardo DiCaprio – Inception
- Michael Douglas – Solitary Man
- Robert Duvall – Get Low
- Jesse Eisenberg – The Social Network
- James Franco – 127 Hours
- Ryan Gosling – Blue Valentine

=== Best Actor – Musical or Comedy ===
- Michael Cera – Scott Pilgrim vs. the World
- Steve Carell – Dinner for Schmucks
- Romain Duris – Heartbreaker
- Andy García – City Island
- Jake Gyllenhaal – Love & Other Drugs
- John Malkovich – Red
- John C. Reilly – Cyrus

=== Best Actress – Drama ===
- Noomi Rapace – The Girl with the Dragon Tattoo
- Nicole Kidman – Rabbit Hole
- Jennifer Lawrence – Winter's Bone
- Helen Mirren – The Tempest
- Natalie Portman – Black Swan
- Tilda Swinton – I Am Love
- Naomi Watts – Fair Game
- Michelle Williams – Blue Valentine

=== Best Actress – Musical or Comedy ===
- Anne Hathaway – Love & Other Drugs
- Annette Bening – The Kids Are All Right
- Sally Hawkins – Made in Dagenham
- Catherine Keener – Please Give
- Julianne Moore – The Kids Are All Right
- Mary-Louise Parker – Red
- Marisa Tomei – Cyrus

=== Best Animated or Mixed Media Film ===
- Toy Story 3
- Alice in Wonderland
- Despicable Me
- How to Train Your Dragon
- The Illusionist
- Legend of the Guardians: The Owls of Ga'Hoole

=== Best Art Direction and Production Design ===
- Inception
- Alice in Wonderland
- Black Swan
- Coco Chanel & Igor Stravinsky
- I Am Love
- Scott Pilgrim vs. the World
- Shutter Island

=== Best Cinematography ===
- Inception
- 127 Hours
- Harry Potter and the Deathly Hallows – Part 1
- I Am Love
- Salt
- Secretariat
- Shutter Island
- Unstoppable

=== Best Costume Design ===
- Alice in Wonderland
- Black Swan
- Eat Pray Love
- The King's Speech
- Robin Hood

=== Best Director ===
- David Fincher – The Social Network
- Ben Affleck – The Town
- Darren Aronofsky – Black Swan
- Danny Boyle – 127 Hours
- Lisa Cholodenko – The Kids Are All Right
- Debra Granik – Winter's Bone
- Tom Hooper – The King's Speech
- David Michôd – Animal Kingdom
- Christopher Nolan – Inception
- Roman Polanski – The Ghost Writer

=== Best Documentary Film ===
- Restrepo
- Behind the Burly Q
- Client 9: The Rise and Fall of Eliot Spitzer
- Countdown to Zero
- A Film Unfinished
- Inside Job
- Joan Rivers: A Piece of Work
- Sequestro
- The Tillman Story
- Waiting for "Superman"

=== Best Editing ===
- Please Give
- Inception
- Shutter Island
- The Social Network
- The Town
- Unstoppable

=== Best Film – Drama ===
- The Social Network
- 127 Hours
- Animal Kingdom
- Blue Valentine
- Get Low
- The Ghost Writer
- Inception
- The King's Speech
- The Town
- Winter's Bone

=== Best Film – Musical or Comedy ===
- Scott Pilgrim vs. the World
- Cyrus
- The Kids Are All Right
- Made in Dagenham
- The Other Guys
- Please Give
- Red

=== Best Foreign Language Film ===
- The Girl with the Dragon Tattoo (Sweden)
- Biutiful (Mexico)
- I Am Love (Italy)
- Mother (Korea)
- Outside the Law (Algeria)
- Soul Kitchen (Germany)
- White Material (France)

=== Best Original Score ===
- Inception
- 127 Hours
- Black Swan
- The Eclipse
- Harry Potter and the Deathly Hallows – Part 1
- Salt
- The Social Network
- Unstoppable

=== Best Original Song ===
- "You Haven't Seen the Last of Me" – Burlesque
- "Alice" – Alice in Wonderland
- "Country Strong" – Country Strong
- "Eclipse (All Yours)" – The Twilight Saga: Eclipse
- "If I Rise" – 127 Hours
- "What Part of Forever" – The Twilight Saga: Eclipse

=== Best Screenplay – Adapted ===
- The Social Network
- 127 Hours
- Fair Game
- The Ghost Writer
- The Girl with the Dragon Tattoo
- Scott Pilgrim vs. the World
- The Town
- Winter's Bone

=== Best Screenplay – Original ===
- The King's Speech
- Biutiful
- The Eclipse
- Get Low
- Inception
- The Kids Are All Right
- Toy Story 3

=== Best Sound ===
- Unstoppable
- 127 Hours
- Inception
- Iron Man 2
- Nowhere Boy
- Secretariat
- Shutter Island

=== Best Supporting Actor ===
- Christian Bale – The Fighter
- Pierce Brosnan – The Ghost Writer
- Andrew Garfield – The Social Network
- Tommy Lee Jones – The Company Men
- Bill Murray – Get Low
- Sean Penn – Fair Game
- Jeremy Renner – The Town
- Geoffrey Rush – The King's Speech

=== Best Supporting Actress ===
- Jacki Weaver – Animal Kingdom
- Amy Adams – The Fighter
- Marion Cotillard – Inception
- Anne-Marie Duff – Nowhere Boy
- Vanessa Redgrave – Letters to Juliet
- Rosamund Pike – Barney's Version
- Kristin Scott Thomas – Nowhere Boy
- Dianne Wiest – Rabbit Hole

=== Best Visual Effects ===
- Alice in Wonderland
- 127 Hours
- Inception
- Iron Man 2
- Legend of the Guardians: The Owls of Ga'Hoole
- Unstoppable

== Television winners and nominees ==
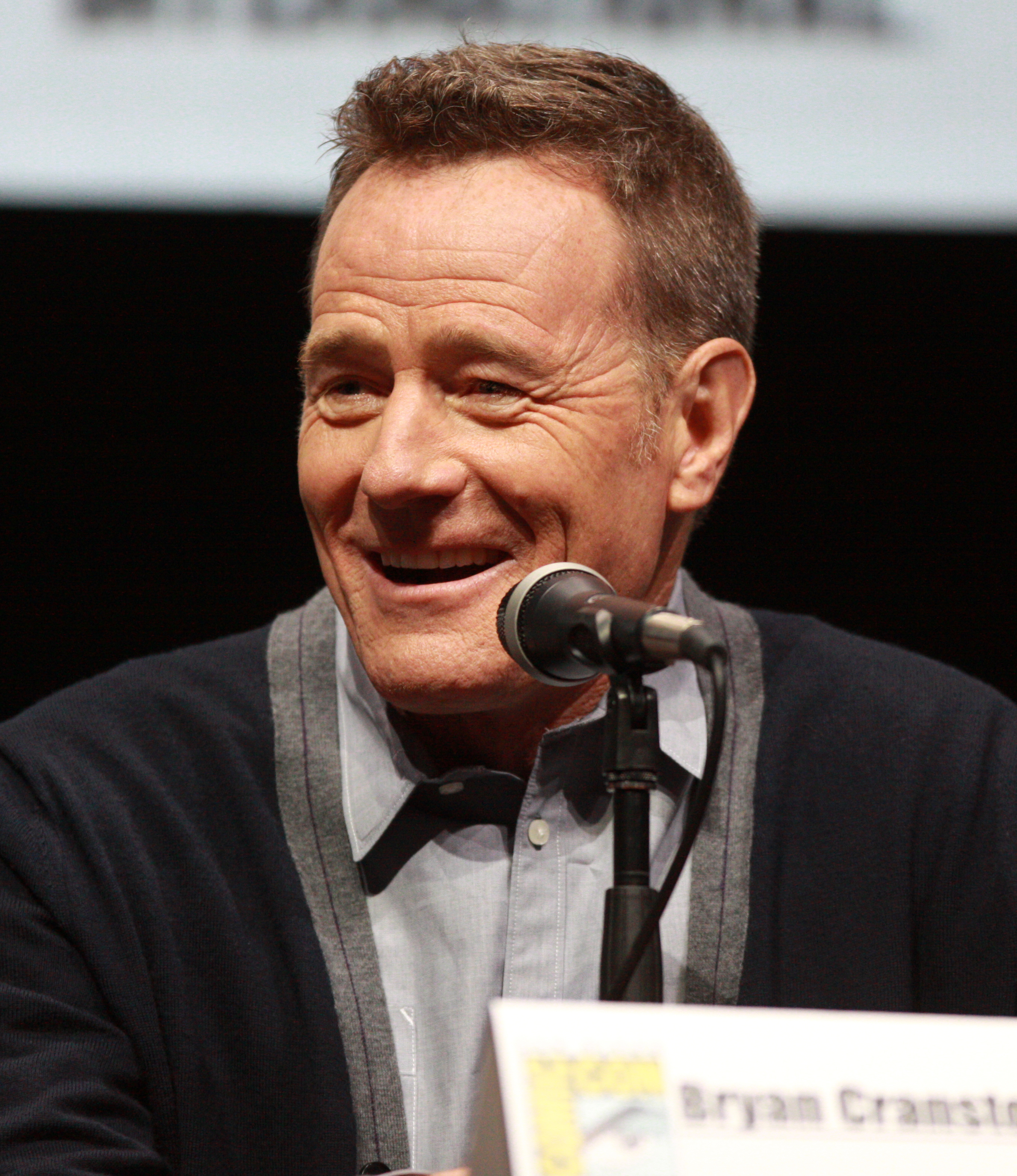
Bryan Cranston, Best Actor in a Drama Series winner

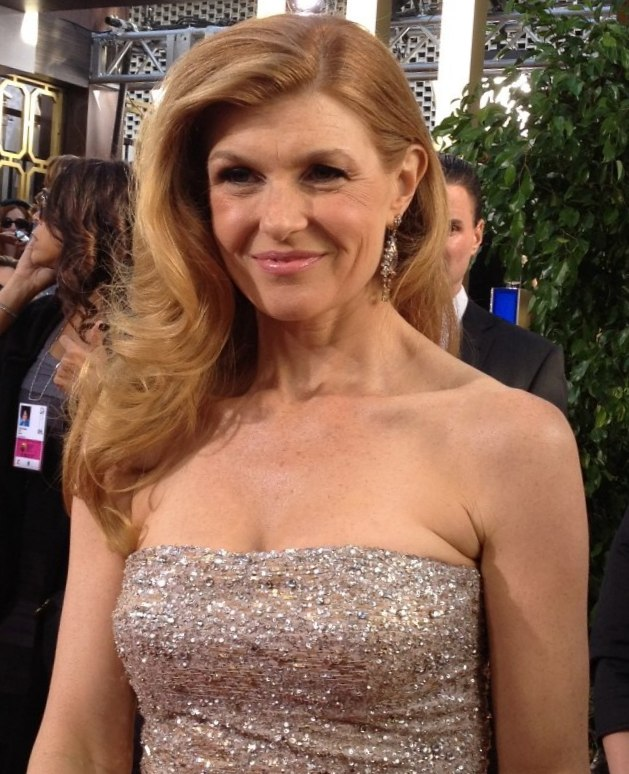
Connie Britton, Best Actress in a Drama Series winner

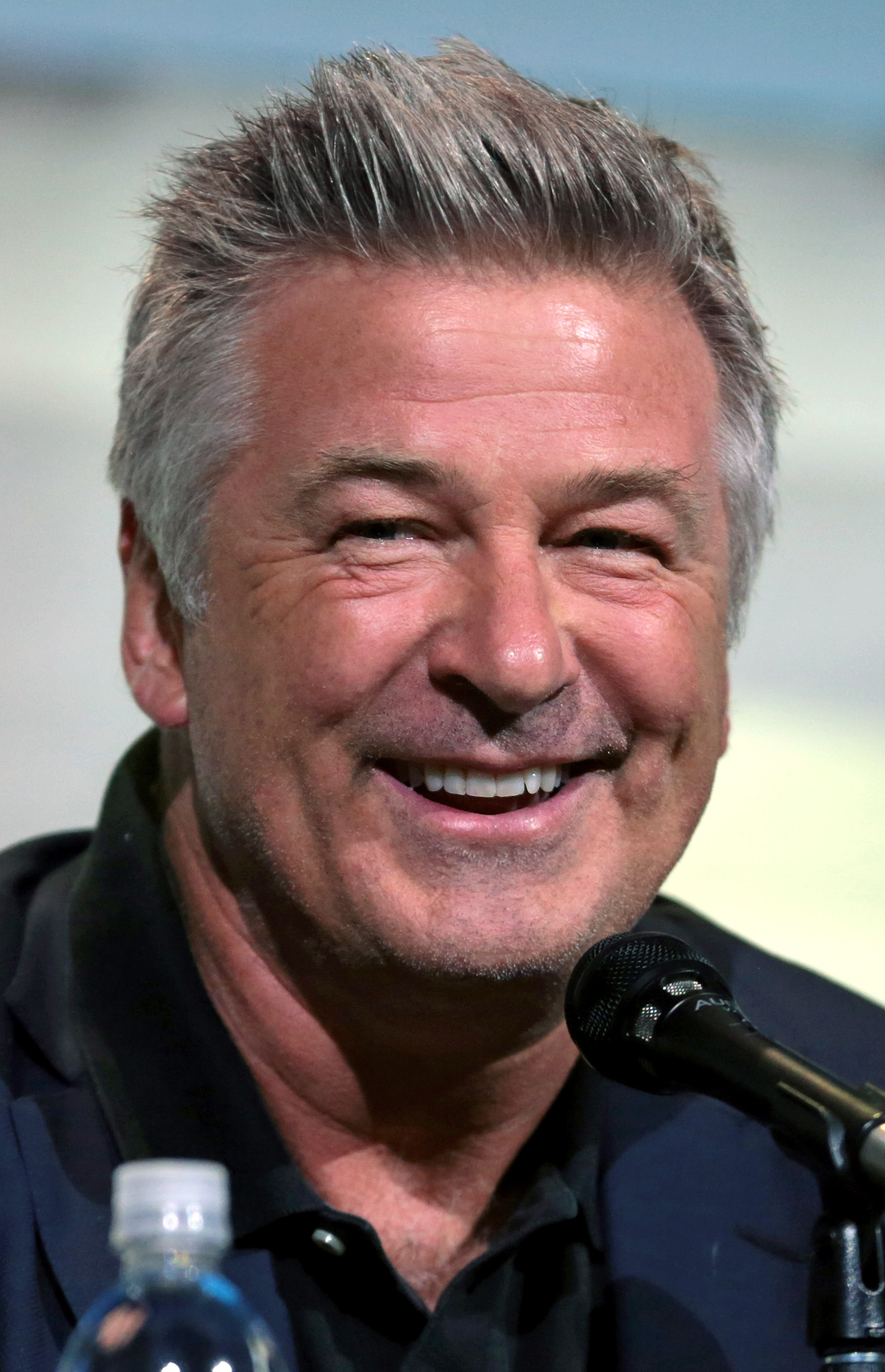
Alec Baldwin, Best Actor in a Comedy or Musical Series winner

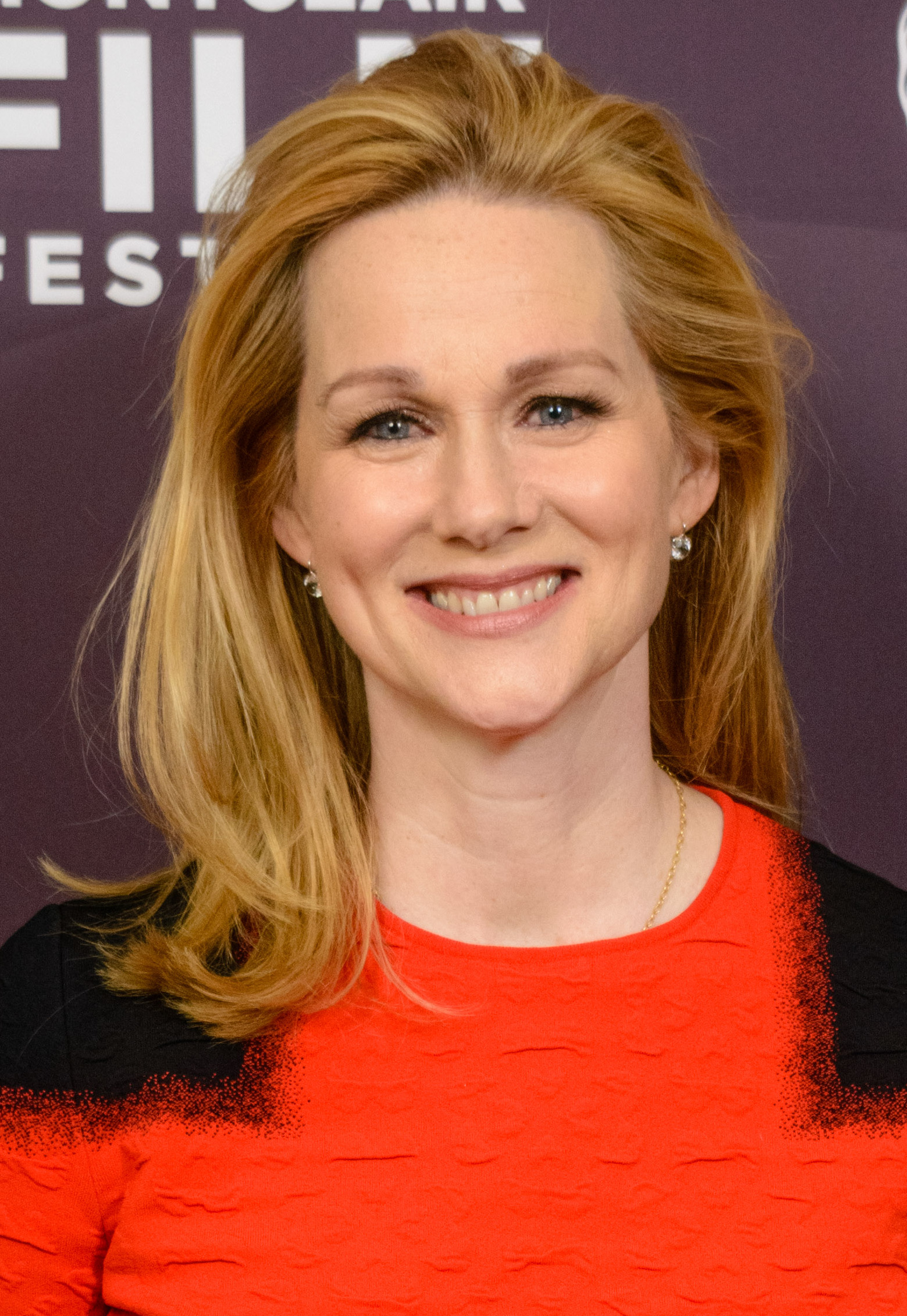
Laura Linney, Best Actress in a Comedy or Musical Series winner

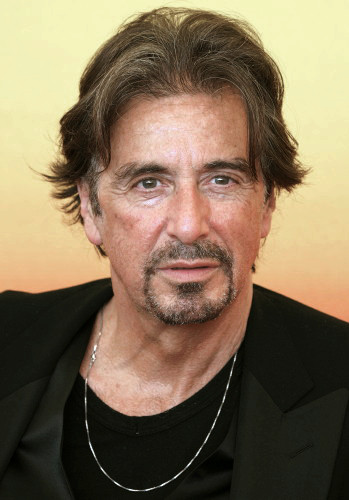
Al Pacino, Best Actor in a Miniseries or Television Film winner

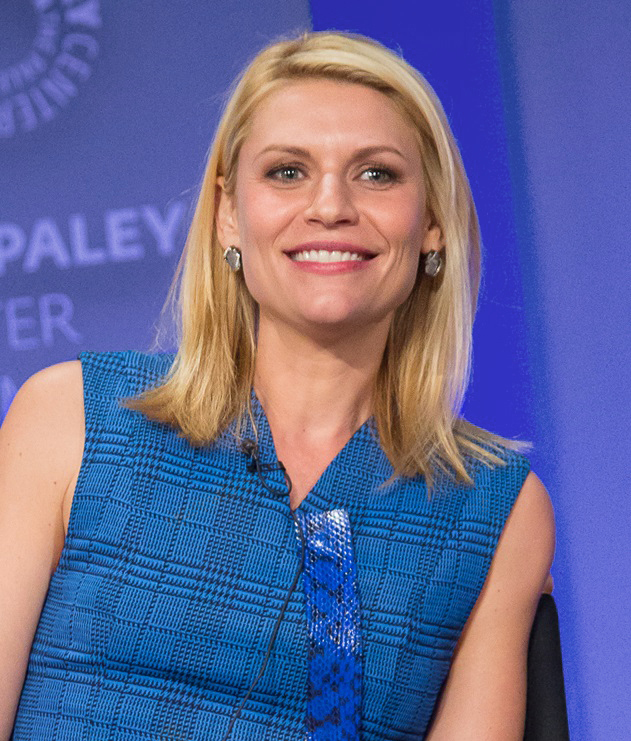
Claire Danes, Best Actress in a Miniseries or Television Film winner

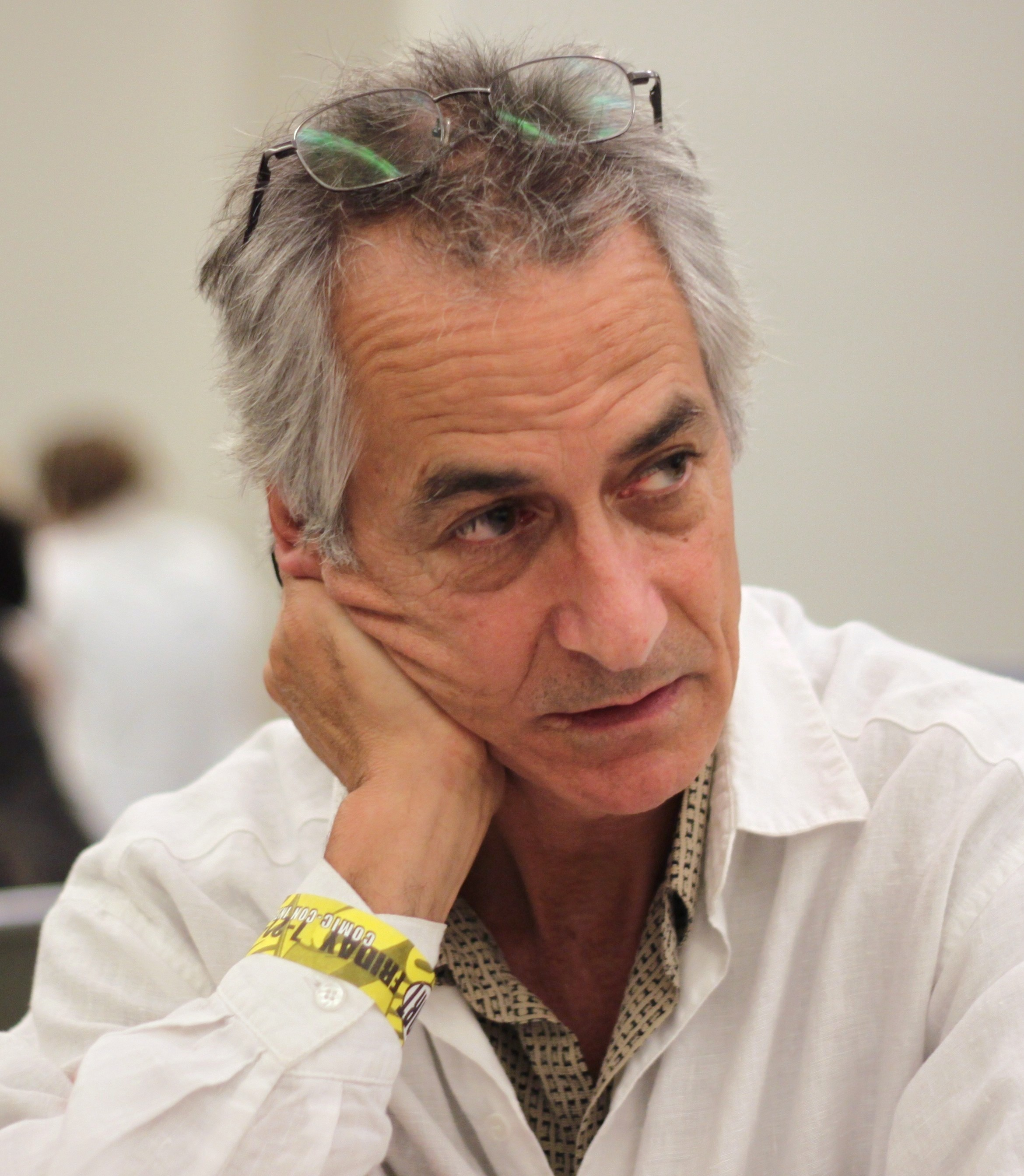
David Strathairn, Best Supporting Actor in a Series, Miniseries, or Television Film winner

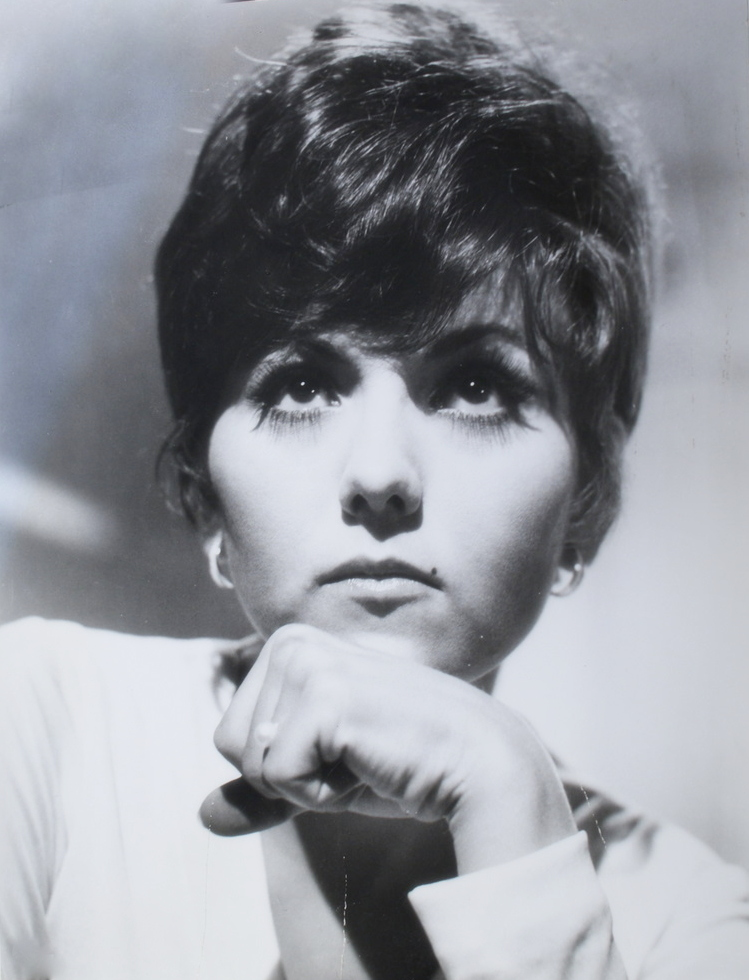
Brenda Vaccaro, Best Supporting Actress in a Series, Miniseries, or Television Film winner

=== Best Actor – Drama Series ===
- Bryan Cranston – Breaking Bad
- Kyle Chandler – Friday Night Lights
- Josh Charles – The Good Wife
- Michael C. Hall – Dexter
- Jon Hamm – Mad Men
- Stephen Moyer – True Blood

=== Best Actor – Musical or Comedy Series ===
- Alec Baldwin – 30 Rock
- Steve Carell – The Office
- Thomas Jane – Hung
- Danny McBride – Eastbound & Down
- Matthew Morrison – Glee
- Jim Parsons – The Big Bang Theory

=== Best Actor – Miniseries or TV Film ===
- Al Pacino – You Don't Know Jack
- Benedict Cumberbatch – Sherlock
- Idris Elba – Luther
- Ian McShane – The Pillars of the Earth
- Barry Pepper – When Love Is Not Enough: The Lois Wilson Story
- Dennis Quaid – The Special Relationship
- David Suchet – Agatha Christie's Poirot: Murder on the Orient Express

=== Best Actress – Drama Series ===
- Connie Britton – Friday Night Lights
- January Jones – Mad Men
- Julianna Margulies – The Good Wife
- Elisabeth Moss – Mad Men
- Anna Paquin – True Blood
- Katey Sagal – Sons of Anarchy

=== Best Actress – Musical or Comedy Series ===
- Laura Linney – The Big C
- Jane Adams – Hung
- Toni Collette – United States of Tara
- Edie Falco – Nurse Jackie
- Tina Fey – 30 Rock
- Lea Michele – Glee
- Mary-Louise Parker – Weeds

=== Best Actress – Miniseries or TV Film ===
- Claire Danes – Temple Grandin
- Hope Davis – The Special Relationship
- Judi Dench – Return to Cranford
- Naomie Harris – Small Island
- Ellie Kendrick – The Diary of Anne Frank
- Winona Ryder – When Love Is Not Enough: The Lois Wilson Story
- Ruth Wilson – Luther

=== Best Miniseries ===
- Sherlock
- Carlos
- Emma
- The Pacific
- The Pillars of the Earth
- Small Island

=== Best Series – Drama ===
- Breaking Bad
- Boardwalk Empire
- Dexter
- Friday Night Lights
- The Good Wife
- Mad Men
- The Tudors

=== Best Series – Musical or Comedy ===
- The Big C
- 30 Rock
- Glee
- Modern Family
- Nurse Jackie
- Raising Hope
- United States of Tara

=== Best Supporting Actor – Miniseries or TV Film ===
- David Strathairn – Temple Grandin
- Ty Burrell – Modern Family
- Bruce Campbell – Burn Notice
- Chris Colfer – Glee
- Alan Cumming – The Good Wife
- Neil Patrick Harris – How I Met Your Mother
- Aaron Paul – Breaking Bad
- Martin Short – Damages

=== Best Supporting Actress – Miniseries or TV Film ===
- Brenda Vaccaro – You Don't Know Jack
- Julie Bowen – Modern Family
- Rose Byrne – Damages
- Sharon Gless – Burn Notice
- Jane Lynch – Glee
- Catherine O'Hara – Temple Grandin
- Archie Panjabi – The Good Wife

=== Best TV Film ===
- Temple Grandin
- The Diary of Anne Frank
- The Special Relationship
- When Love Is Not Enough: The Lois Wilson Story
- You Don't Know Jack

== Awards breakdown ==
=== Film ===
Winners:

3 / 7 The Social Network: Best Director / Best Film – Drama / Best Screenplay – Adapted
3 / 11 Inception: Best Art Direction and Production Design / Best Cinematography / Best Original Score
2 / 4 Scott Pilgrim vs. the World: Best Actor – Musical or Comedy / Best Film – Musical or Comedy
2 / 5 Alice in Wonderland: Best Costume Design / Best Visual Effects
2 / 6 The King's Speech: Best Actor – Drama / Best Screenplay – Original
1 / 1 Burlesque: Best Original Song
1 / 1 Restrepo: Best Documentary Film
1 / 2 The Fighter: Best Supporting Actor
1 / 2 Love & Other Drugs: Best Actress – Musical or Comedy
1 / 2 Toy Story 3: Best Animated or Mixed Media Film
1 / 3 Animal Kingdom: Best Supporting Actress
1 / 3 The Girl with the Dragon Tattoo: Best Actress – Drama / Best Foreign Language Film
1 / 3 Please Give: Best Editing
1 / 5 Unstoppable: Best Sound

Losers:

0 / 9 127 Hours
0 / 5 Black Swan, The Kids Are All Right, The Town
0 / 4 Get Low, The Ghost Writer, I Am Love, Shutter Island, Winter's Bone
0 / 3 Biutiful, Blue Valentine, Cyrus, Fair Game, Nowhere Boy, Red
0 / 2 The Eclipse, Harry Potter and the Deathly Hallows – Part 1, Iron Man 2, Legend of the Guardians: The Owls of Ga'Hoole, Made in Dagenham, Rabbit Hole, Salt, Secretariat

=== Television ===
Winners:

3 / 4 Temple Grandin: Best Actress – Miniseries or TV Film / Best Supporting Actor – Miniseries or TV Film / Best TV Film
2 / 2 The Big C: Best Actress – Musical or Comedy Series / Best Series – Musical or Comedy
2 / 3 Breaking Bad: Best Actor – Drama Series / Best Series – Drama
2 / 3 You Don't Know Jack: Best Actor – Miniseries or TV Film / Best Supporting Actress – Miniseries or TV Film
1 / 2 Sherlock: Best Miniseries
1 / 3 30 Rock: Best Actor – Musical or Comedy Series
1 / 3 Friday Night Lights: Best Actress – Drama Series

Losers:

0 / 5 Glee, The Good Wife
0 / 4 Mad Men
0 / 3 Modern Family, The Special Relationship, When Love Is Not Enough: The Lois Wilson Story
0 / 2 Burn Notice, Damages, Dexter, The Diary of Anne Frank, Hung, Luther, Nurse Jackie, The Pillars of the Earth, Small Island, True Blood, United States of Tara
