= Henry Martin (Kinsale MP) =

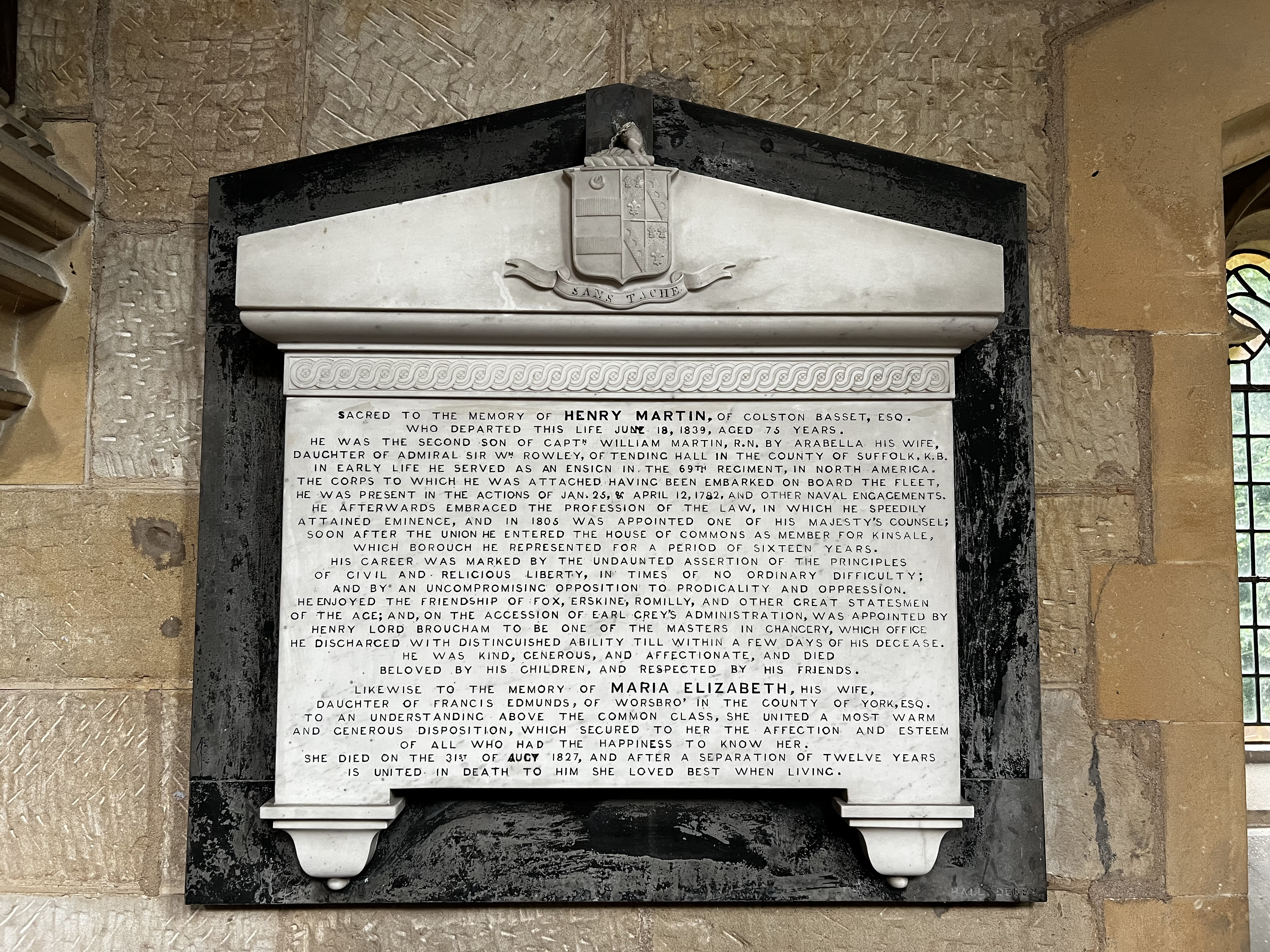
- Memorial to Henry Martin in St John's Church, Colston Bassett

Member of Parliament for Kinsale
- In office 1818–1826

Personal details
- Born: December 21, 1763
- Died: July 19, 1839
- Occupation: Politician

Henry Martin (21 December 1763 – 19 July 1839) was a Member of Parliament. He represented the constituency of Kinsale from 29 April 1806 to 27 June 1818.

He was the second son of Captain William Martin R.N. by Arabella his wife, daughter of Admiral Sir William Rowley of Tending Hall in the County of Suffolk, K.B. In early life he served as an ensign in the 69th regiment in North America. The corps to which he was attached having been embarked on board the fleet, he was present in the actions of 25 January 1782 and 12 April 1782 and other naval engagements.

Martin owned the estate village of Colston Bassett and was responsible for the building of several larger houses including the rectory.

He married Maria Elizabeth Edmunds, daughter of Francis Edmunds, of Worsbrough in the county of York, Esq., on 14 July 1795.

They had one son Captain George Bohum Martin RN CB (1799-1854).

He died on 19 July 1839, aged seventy-five.

Parliament of the United Kingdom
Preceded by Samuel Campbell Rowley	Member of Parliament for Kinsale; 1806–1818	Succeeded by George Coussmaker
