= Sixth Commandment =

The Sixth Commandment of the Ten Commandments could refer to:

- "Thou shalt not kill" or "Thou shalt not murder", under the Philonic division used by Hellenistic Jews, Greek Orthodox and Protestants except Lutherans, or the Talmudic division of the third-century Jewish Talmud
- "Thou shalt not commit adultery", under the Augustinian division used by Roman Catholics and Lutherans
- Ika-6 na Utos
- The Sixth Commandment (TV series), a true-life crime drama first shown on BBC in 2023
