= Charles Marriott Oldrid Scott =

English architect

- Born: 1880
- Died: 1952 (aged 71–72)
- Occupation: Architect
- Children: Sheila Grace Shorrock and Helen Baret Deed
- Parent(s): John Oldrid Scott and Mary Ann née Stevens

Charles Marriott Oldrid Scott (1880–1952) was an English architect who is often best remembered for being the son of John Oldrid Scott and grandson of Sir Gilbert Scott (George Gilbert Scott), both of whom were architects, as was his uncle George Gilbert Scott Jr. and his cousins Sir Giles Gilbert Scott and Adrian Gilbert Scott. He was married and had two children; Sheila Grace and Helen Baret. After living in central London for some time, he moved to Little Kimble, near Aylesbury, Buckinghamshire.

He was a pupil of Sir Reginald Blomfield in 1898, then in 1902 became an assistant to his father for a year before spending a further year in the office of George Frederick Bodley, who had himself been a past pupil of George Gilbert Scott. In 1904 he rejoined his father's practice of Scott & Son in Westminster, London, as his partner.

During the thirties he practiced under the name of Scott & Miles, his partner being Charles Thomas Miles. One of his last projects before his death related to works to Maids Moreton Church which is only 3 miles from his grandfather's place of birth in Gawcott, near Buckingham. The majority of his work was ecclesiastical.

== Works included ==
- St George’s Institute, Wolverton, Milton Keynes, Buckinghamshire (1908)
- St Christopher's Church, Southbourne, Bournemouth, (1932–1934)
- Speldhurst war memorial, Kent
- Croydon Parish Church war memorial, Surrey (1922)

== Alterations, repairs and extensions ==
- St Asaph Cathedral, Wales (1930)
- Benenden School Hall, Benenden, Kent (1938)
- St. Edmund Church, Maids Moreton, Buckinghamshire (1951–1952)
- St James's Church, Pokesdown, Bournemouth (1930–1931)
- St Mary's Episcopal Cathedral, Edinburgh, Scotland (1913–1917) Completion of western spire to George Gilbert Scott's 1873 designs
- St. Michael & All Angels, Stewkley, Buckinghamshire (1937–1938)
- Oxted Place, Oxted, Surrey
- St Peter and St Paul Church, Buckingham, Buckinghamshire (1922) New boiler room added
- Southwark Cathedral, London (1911) Restoration and repairs
- St. John's Church, Colston Bassett (1934) repairs
