= The Sparrow (2022 film) =

2022 Irish film

- Theatrical film poster
- Directed by: Michael Kinirons
- Written by: Michael Kinirons
- Produced by: Alicia Ní Ghráinne
- Starring: Ollie West; David O'Hara; Éanna Hardwicke; Isabelle Connolly; Aisling O'Sullivan; Mark O'Halloran; Dara Devaney; Grace Kinirons
- Cinematography: Richard Kendrick
- Edited by: John Walters
- Music by: Christopher White
- Release dates: July 8, 2022 (Galway); July 5, 2024 (Ireland)
- Running time: 92 mins.
- Country: Ireland
- Language: English

The Sparrow is a 2022 Irish psychological drama film, written and directed by Michael Kinirons. It stars Ollie West, David O'Hara, Éanna Hardwicke, Isabelle Connolly, Aisling O'Sullivan, Mark O'Halloran, Dara Devaney, and Grace Kinirons. It premiered at the Galway Film Fleadh in 2022, before a later release in Ireland in 2024.

== Synopsis ==
Wild teen Kevin Coyle grapples with guilt over a deadly secret. As his world unravels and consequences mount, Kevin is pushed to confront the truth in a heart-wrenching climax that will change him forever.

== Cast ==
- Ollie West as Kevin
- David O'Hara as Larry
- Éanna Hardwicke as Robbie
- Isabelle Connolly as Hanna
- Aisling O'Sullivan as Aunt Grace
- Mark O'Halloran as Garda Mahon
- Dara Devaney as Manny
- Grace Kinirons as School Principal

== Reception ==
On the review aggregator website Rotten Tomatoes, 100% of 8 critics' reviews are positive, with an average rating of 7.10/10.

Tara Brady of The Irish Times dubbed it "an exquisitely crafted, expertly performed Irish murder ballad". Harry Guerin of RTÉ rated the film 3/5 stars and lauded director/writer Michael Kinirons for "proving adept at depicting the dynamic father/son relationship". Alan Zilberman of the Washington City Paper applauded for David O'Hara as "the real highlight of the film".

Cath Clarke of The Guardian also rated it 3/5 stars, praising lead star Ollie West's "superb performance as a sensitive misfit". Matthew Briody of Film Ireland regaled the film from its cinematography to its sound, plus also raved about West's ("unforgettable, raw emotion, primal rage") and O'Hara's ("particularly impressive, terrifying yet vulnerable") performances.

Chris Wasser of the Irish Independent, in a positive review, labelled it "icy and unsettling". And Jason Flatt of But Why Tho? proclaimed, "The movie gives nothing away easily and holds you so tightly all the way through until the very last frame."
