= Listed buildings in Colston Bassett =

Colston Bassett is a civil parish in the Rushcliffe district of Nottinghamshire, England. The parish contains 23 listed buildings that are recorded in the National Heritage List for England. Of these, one is listed at Grade I, the highest of the three grades, and the others are at Grade II, the lowest grade. The parish contains the village of Colston Bassett and the surrounding countryside. In the parish are two listed churches, one active, and the other in ruins, with listed headstones in the churchyard of the latter. The other listed buildings include houses, farmhouses and a dovecote, a village cross, a public house, two bridges, a canal milepost, a war memorial and a telephone kiosk.

== Key ==
Grade	Criteria
I	Buildings of exceptional interest, sometimes considered to be internationally important
II	Buildings of national importance and special interest

== Buildings ==
Name and location	Photograph	Date	Notes	Grade
Remains of Church of St Mary; 52.89761°N 0.96842°W		12th century	The church has been altered and extended throughout the centuries, but has become disused and is now a ruin. It is in stone, without a roof, and it consists of a nave, a south aisle, a south transept, a chancel, and a west tower. The tower has two-light bell openings, a quatrefoil frieze with corner gargoyles, and an embattled parapet with corner pinnacles, Inside the church are two Norman circular piers.	I
Village cross 52.89167°N 0.96305°W		15th century (possible)	The cross, in the centre of a road junction, has a medieval sandstone base of four octagonal steps. The upper parts date from 1831, they are in limestone, and consist of a shaft on a moulded base, and at the top is a square abacus, and a ball and stalk finial.	II
Manor Farmhouse; 52.89156°N 0.95948°W	—	1625	The oldest part of the farmhouse is the right gable wall and chimney breast, the rest dating from a rebuild in 1784. The older part is in stone with quoins, and the rest is in red brick on a plinth, with quoins, bracketed eaves, and a blue slate roof with stone copings on brick kneelers. There are two storeys and an attic, and a T-shaped plan, with a front range of three bays and a rear wing. The doorway has a segmental head and a tripartite fanlight, and above it is a tall narrow stair window. The other windows are tripartite casements with segmental heads. There are datestones on the chimney breast and the rear wing.	II
Colston Hall; 52.89366°N 0.96656°W		c. 1704	The house, which was remodelled in about 1860, is in Italianate style. It is in stuccoed brick with a rusticated ground floor, quoins, a dentilled moulded and modillion eaves cornice, and a balustraded parapet. There are three storeys and a basement, the front facing the road has five bays, the entrance front has seven bays, and the garden front has five. The middle three bays of the main front project, and are flanked by fluted giant Corinthian pilasters. The windows are sashes in moulded architraves, those in the middle floor with pediments. In the entrance front is a two-storey porch, and on the garden front six steps lead up to a French window, above which is a window with a segmental pediment and a bow-shaped balcony. Attached to the garden front is an orangery with sides of five and three bays, and it has round-headed windows separated by Corinthian pilasters.	II
Group of headstones south of the south transept 52.89741°N 0.96820°W	—	Early 18th century	The headstones are in the churchyard of St Mary's Church, most are in slate, and eight are of listable quality. Three of them are carved with a round-faced winged angel.	II
Dovecote, Manor Farm; 52.89177°N 0.95895°W	—	Early 18th century (probable)	The dovecote is in red brick, and has a tile roof with coped gables and kneelers. There is a square plan, and an enlarged doorway on the northeast side. Inside, there are nesting boxes on three sides.	II
Martins Arms Public House; 52.89150°N 0.96352°W		Early 18th century	The public house, which was later extended, is in painted brick, and has a slate roof with brick coped gables and kneelers. There are two storeys and attics, a front range of three bays, and rear wings with pantile roofs. The doorway has a gabled canopy on brackets, the windows are tripartite casements with segmental heads, and there is a small gabled dormer.	II
Spencer headstone 52.89742°N 0.96826°W		1730	The headstone is in the churchyard of St Mary's Church, and is to the memory of John Spencer. It is in slate and rectangular, and is carved with two round-faced winged angels and an inscribed heart.	II
Speight headstone 52.89740°N 0.96845°W	—	1746	The headstone is in the churchyard of St Mary's Church, and is to the memory of Abigail Speight. It is in slate, and rectangular with a shaped panel. In the corners are relief carvings of an hourglass, a book and a scythe.	II
Cam headstone 52.89722°N 0.96848°W		1750	The headstone is in the churchyard of St Mary's Church, and is to the memory of members of the Cam family. It is in slate and rectangular, and is carved with two round-faced winged angels.	II
Smite Bridge; 52.89242°N 0.96418°W	—	Mid 18th century	The bridge carries Hall Lane over the River Smite. It is in stone and consists of three round arches, the middle one the largest, and is slightly hump-backed. There are bull-nosed cutwaters, a string course, keystones, a deep parapet and square end piers.	II
Group of headstones between the chancel and the south transept 52.89755°N 0.96820°W	—	1751	The headstones are in the churchyard of St Mary's Church, they are in slate, and six are of listable quality. They are carved with various motifs.	II
Group of headstones south of the south transept 52.89737°N 0.96812°W	—	Mid to late 18th century	The headstones are in the churchyard of St Mary's Church, they are in slate, six are of listable quality, and they are to the memory of members of the Church family. Most are carved with various motifs.	II
China Bridge; 52.89646°N 0.96218°W		Late 18th century	The bridge carries Wash Pit Lane over the River Smite. It is in stone with a brick vault, and consists of a single depressed arch. The bridge is hump-backed, and has swept sides, three courses of brick voussoirs, and chamfered copings, and the north side is rendered.	II
Canal post 52.89601°N 0.99163°W		Late 18th century	The canal mile post on the Grantham Canal is in cast iron, and consists of a post with a rounded head and a moulded edge. It is inscribed with the distance in miles from the River Trent.	II
Group of headstones south of the tower 52.89720°N 0.96843°W	—	Late 18th century	The headstones are in the churchyard of St Mary's Church, they are in slate, and four are of listable quality. They are carved with various motifs.	II
Thompson headstone 52.89747°N 0.96849°W	—	1784	The headstone is in the churchyard of St Mary's Church, and is to the memory of Joseph Thompson. It is in slate and shaped, and is decorated with flowers and a relief vase in a heart shape.	II
Draper headstone 52.89740°N 0.96889°W	—	1799	The headstone is in the churchyard of St Mary's Church, and is to the memory of Mary Draper. It is in slate with a shaped head, and is decorated in relief with a winged head in a round panel.	II
Edmondthorpe Lodge; 52.90284°N 0.96128°W		Early 19th century	A brick farmhouse that has a hipped slate roof with oversailing eaves. There are two storeys, a front range of three bays, and rear wings. In the centre is a square porch with a round-headed entrance, and a doorway with a fanlight and a small hood. The windows are segmental-headed sashes, and in the left return is a bow window.	II
The Old Rectory; 52.89303°N 0.97055°W	—	1834 (probable)	The former rectory is in brick, and has a slate roof and gables with stone coping on massive moulded kneelers. There are two storeys and five gabled bays. On the front is a lean-to porch, the windows are casements with chamfered reveals, there is a gabled dormer, two French windows, and a canted oriel window.	II
St John's Church; 52.89233°N 0.96124°W		1892	The church is in stone with a blue slate roof, and is in Perpendicular style. It has a cruciform plan, consisting of a nave with a clerestory, north and south aisles, a south porch, north and south transepts, a steeple at the crossing, and a chancel. The steeple has a square tower with diagonal buttresses, two-light bell openings, and an embattled parapet with corner and intermediate piers. It is surmounted by a tall slender octagonal spire with lucarnes.	II
War memorial 52.89254°N 0.96099°W	—	1920	The war memorial is in the churchyard of St John's Church. It is in limestone, and consists of a wheel cross, decorated with foliate carvings, in the centre is a rose motif, and the wheel has a crossed ribbon design. The shaft is octagonal, on a square plinth, on a base of a single step. There are inscriptions on the front and rear faces of the plinth.	II
Telephone kiosk 52.89126°N 0.96373°W		1935	The K6 type telephone kiosk was designed by Giles Gilbert Scott. Constructed in cast iron with a square plan and a dome, it has three unperforated crowns in the top panels.	II
