= Death of Peter Farquhar =

2015 death in Buckinghamshire, England

Peter Farquhar was a retired teacher of English and novelist. After his death on 26 October 2015, his former student and lodger Benjamin L. Field was convicted of murdering him. In 2026, Field's conviction was overturned on appeal, and judges ordered a retrial.

== Background ==
=== Peter Farquhar ===
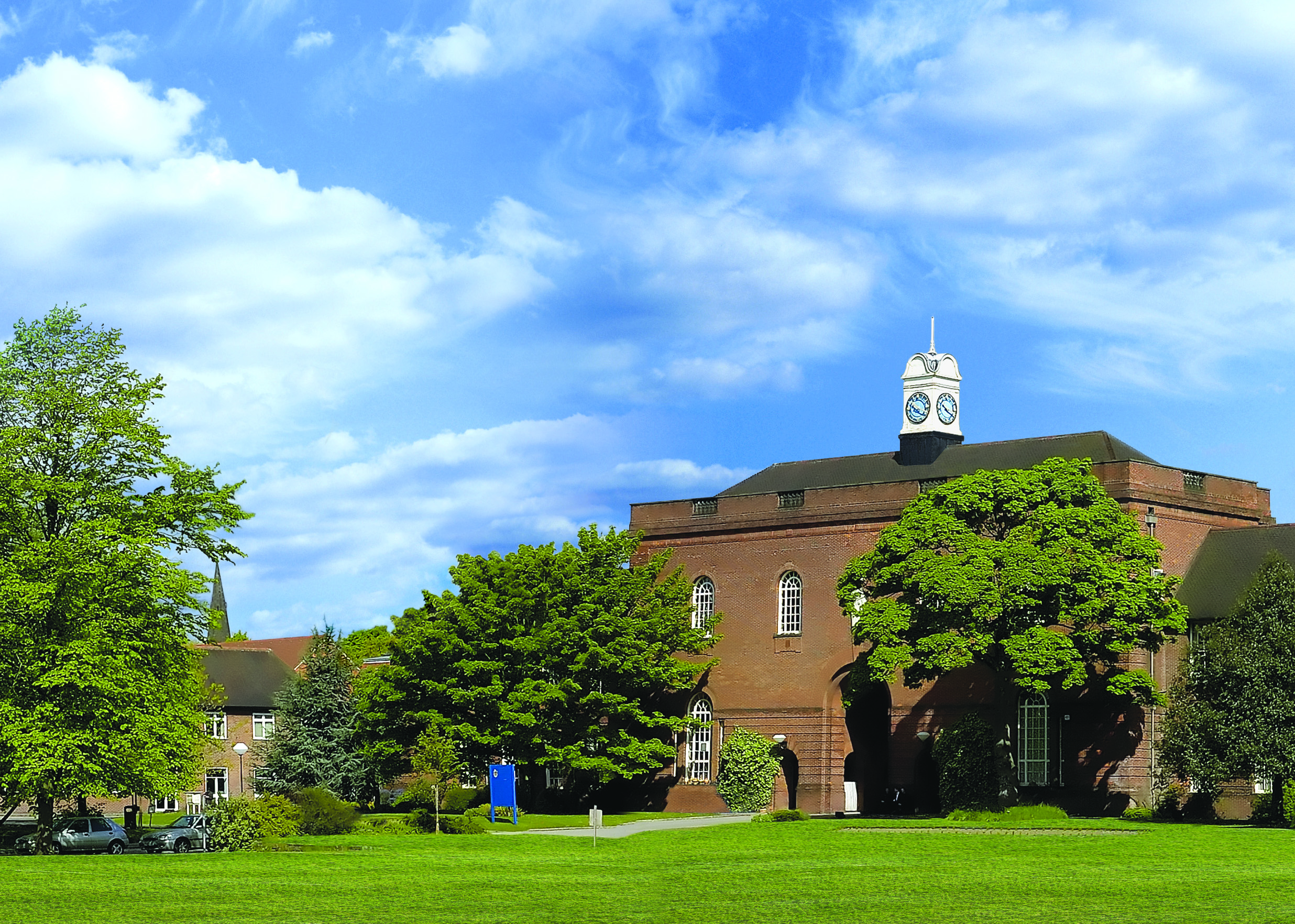
Manchester Grammar School

Peter Farquhar was born in Edinburgh on 3 January 1946, the son of a physician. He was educated at Latymer Upper School in London and then Churchill College, Cambridge, where he achieved a first-class degree in English.

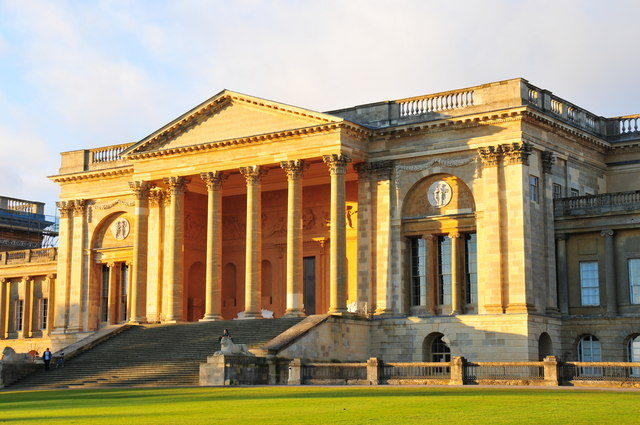
Stowe School

Farquhar was an English teacher for 34 years, firstly at Manchester Grammar School (1970–82) then Stowe School (1983–2004). From 2007 he was an occasional lecturer at University of Buckingham. He was described by his friend and former pupil at Manchester, Michael Crick, as having "an acute understanding of the problems of modern adolescent boys. For some, he became almost like a second father."

His first novel, A Wide Wide Sea, a coming-of-age story about three teenagers from Edinburgh who travel to France and Spain on a voyage of self-discovery, was written in 1997 but not published until 2015. It was published only after two Buckingham students, Ben Field and Martyn Smith, discovered the manuscript and persuaded Farquhar to publish it. His novel, Between Boy and Man, was published in 2010. The plot was largely based on Farquhar's own experience at Stowe and concerned the struggle of a school chaplain to reconcile his Christian faith with his homosexuality. This was followed by A Bitter Heart, published in 2012.

The character of Dr. Farquhar, played by Toby Stephens in the 2013 film Believe, directed by the former Manchester Grammar School pupil David Scheinmann, was partly based on Farquhar.

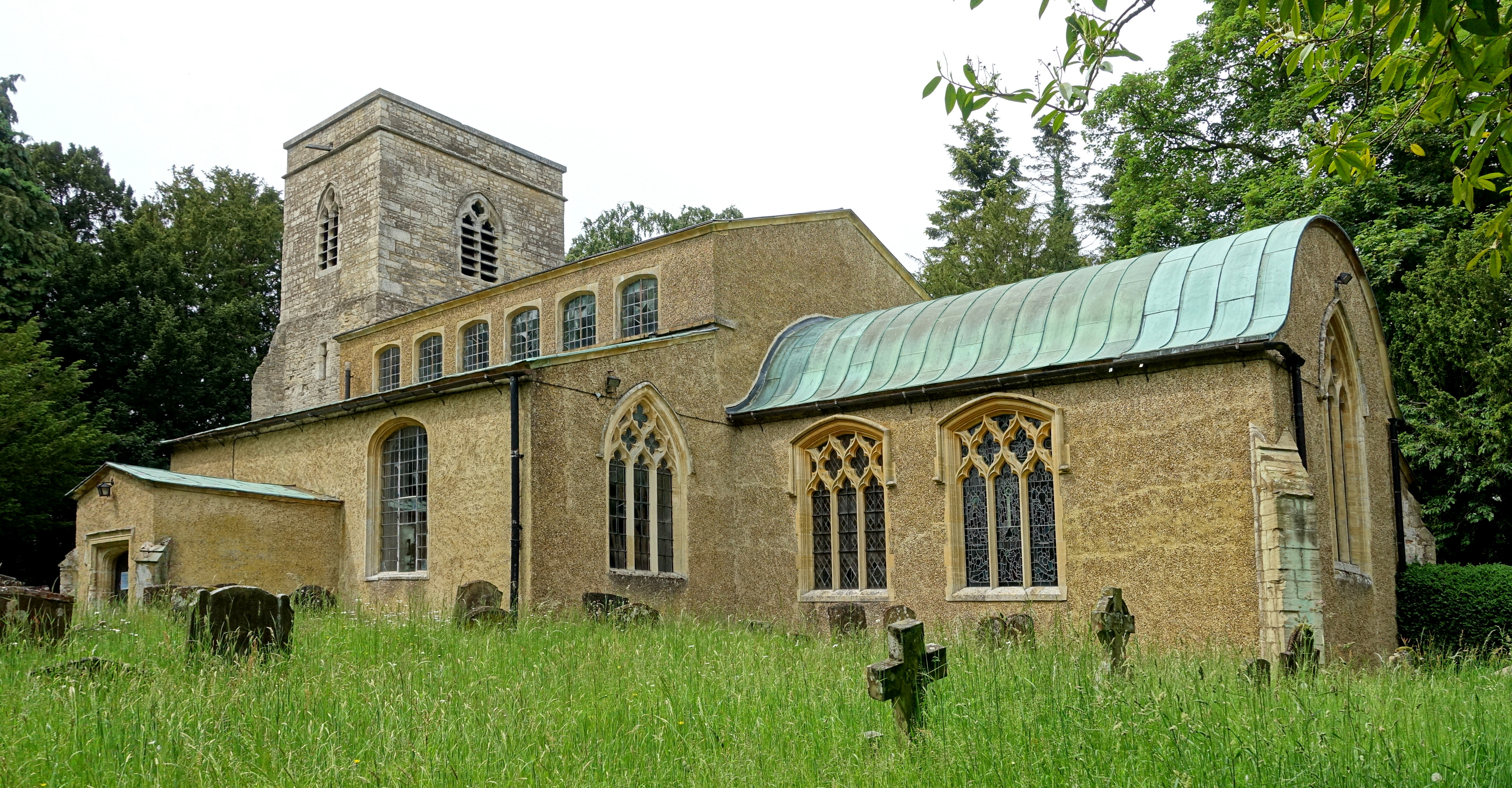
St Mary's Church in Stowe, where Farquhar worshipped and preached.

Farquhar was an evangelical Christian who was a lay minister and once considered seeking ordination. He worshipped and preached at Stowe Parish Church for 20 years.

=== Ben Field ===
Benjamin Luke Field (born 1991) was a student at the University of Buckingham, and voluntary unpaid assistant churchwarden at Stowe Parish Church. He was undergoing the discernment process preparatory to the Bishops Advisory Panel (BAP), hoping to undertake training to be a priest.

== Death of Farquhar ==
Farquhar died in Maids Moreton, Buckinghamshire, on 26 October 2015. His death was initially recorded as "accidental" as the result of acute alcohol ingestion. Evidence produced in court indicated that Farquhar was 'betrothed' (through a private informal ceremony) to Field in 2014. In January 2018, Field and magician friend Martyn Smith were arrested by police on suspicion of murdering Farquhar and attempting to murder his neighbour Ann Moore-Martin, 83.

Smith had been staying at pensioner Liz Zettl's house. Zettl was friends with both Moore-Martin and Farquhar. Smith and Field were also accused of possessing a copy of Zettl's will, with the intention of finding out how much the pensioner was 'worth': authorities believed that she was intended to be Field's third victim. At the trial, Zettl became the oldest court witness in British history when she testified aged 101.

Following his arrest, psychiatrists diagnosed Field as having either narcissistic personality disorder or psychopathic personality disorder.

During his trial at Oxford Crown Court, Field admitted drugging Farquhar with benzodiazepines and hallucinogens to "torment" him, telling the jury that he did it "for no other reason other than it was cruel, to upset and torment Peter – purely out of meanness". He also spiked his drink with bioethanol and poteen in order to make him question his sanity. According to prosecutors, Field suffocated Farquhar when he was too weak to resist.

=== Conviction and sentence ===
On 9 August 2019, Field was convicted of Farquhar's murder. He was acquitted of the attempted murder of Ann Moore-Martin, who died of natural causes on 12 May 2017. Smith was acquitted of all charges.

On 19 October 2019, Field was sentenced to life imprisonment, with a minimum term of 36 years.

=== Restitution of funds ===
In August 2023, Field paid more than £124,000 to the families of Farquhar and Moore-Martin, after he was ordered to sell his flat in Towcester following a court confiscation order.

=== Appeals ===
Field first appealed against his conviction in March 2021. It was argued at the Court of Appeal that the trial judge, Mr Justice Sweeney, misdirected the jury over the 'chain of causation' involved in Mr Farquhar's death – specifically, whether the victim was 'tricked' by Field into drinking whisky, or had done so out of choice. The appeal was rejected.

In January 2022 Field appealed a second time against his conviction, but this was also rejected.

In July 2023, Field applied for the Criminal Cases Review Commission (CCRC) to investigate whether to refer his case to the Court of Appeal. The CCRC approved Field's request in September 2025 and announced that his case would be referred to the court to reconsider the causation issue. This was the first known instance of the CCRC referring a conviction to the Court of Appeal without new evidence being presented, as the Commission found there were "exceptional circumstances" which justified the referral.

Field's appeal was heard by the court on 5 March 2026, with judgement reserved until a later date. His lawyers argued there was no evidence that Farquhar had been forced or deceived into drinking the whisky and tranquilisers which killed him.

On 16 April 2026, Field's conviction was quashed by the Court of Appeal and judges ordered a retrial. The judges allowed the Crown Prosecution Services to take the case to the Supreme Court before the retrial. The judges said that jurors at trial had "not been properly directed", were given "defective" directions on how to reach a verdict. Lord Justice Andrew Edis, delivering the ruling, said the trial judge "effectively withdrew from the jury the question of whether Mr Farquhar's decision to drink the whisky had been voluntary". Field will remain in prison while the appeal is still pending.

== In popular media ==
"A Diary From the Grave", a documentary about the murders, aired in January 2020 on Channel 4 as part of the Catching a Killer series.

Farquhar is depicted by Timothy Spall in the 2023 BBC One drama The Sixth Commandment, written by Sarah Phelps, about the gaslighting of Farquhar and Moore-Martin by Field. Moore-Martin is played by Anne Reid, Field by Éanna Hardwicke, along with Smith being portrayed by Conor MacNeill and Zettl by Sheila Hancock. The miniseries first aired in July 2023.

In 2021, a book by David Wilson, A Plot to Kill, was published about his murder.

In 2022 Crime Documentary "Britain's most evil killers" featured the story of Ben Field and Peter Farquhar.
