= Éanna Hardwicke =

Irish actor

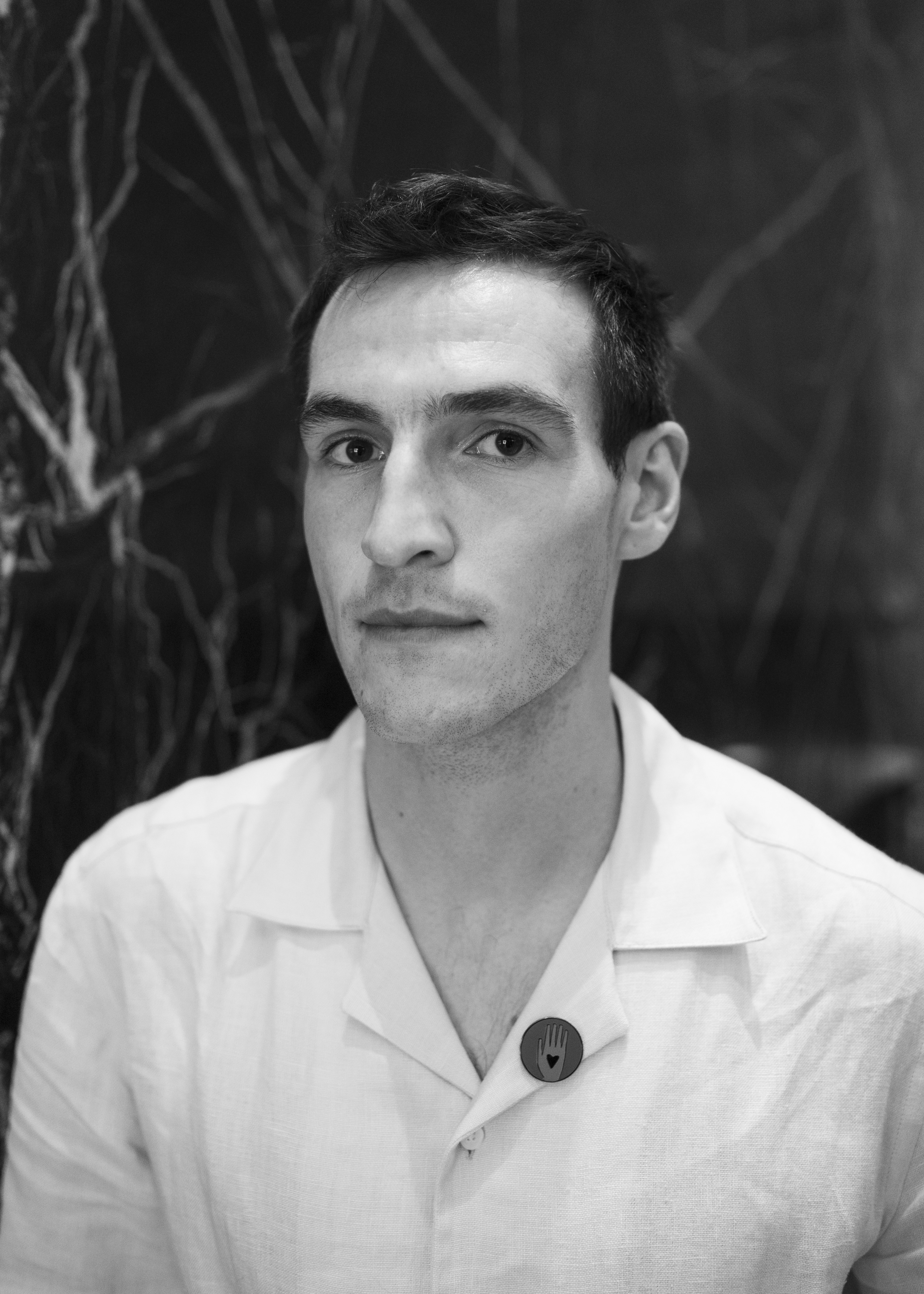
- Hardwicke in 2025
- Born: 21 October 1996 (age 29); Cork, Ireland
- Education: The Lir Academy (BA)
- Occupations: Actor, filmmaker
- Years active: 2009; 2019–present

Éanna Hardwicke (born 21 October 1996) is an Irish actor and filmmaker. He began his career as a child actor in Conor McPherson's The Eclipse (2009). His films since include Lakelands (2022) and Saipan (2025). On television, he is known for his roles in the BBC One series The Sixth Commandment and the Paramount+ series The Doll Factory (both 2023). For the former, he won an RTS Programme Award and was nominated for a British Academy Television Award.

Hardwicke was named a Screen International Rising Star in the publication's inaugural Irish edition.

== Early life and education ==
Hardwicke is originally from the St Luke's–Military Hill area of Cork before his family moved out to Glanmire. He attended Cork School Project (now Cork Educate Together National School) and then Ashton School.

He began acting at the age of 10, participating in youth theatre at the Gaiety School of Acting's Cork campus, National Association of Youth Drama (NAYD), and Cork School of Music. He went on to graduate with a Bachelor of Arts degree in acting from The Lir Academy in 2018.

== Career ==
Hardwicke began his career as a child actor in Conor McPherson's 2009 horror film The Eclipse.

He returned to the screen ten years later in 2019, appearing in the science fiction film Vivarium and making his television debut in an episode of the Syfy series Krypton. He also appeared in The Misfit Mythology at the Cork Arts Theatre and participated in a RISE Productions podcast in which he, Gavin Kostick, Danielle Galligan, and Janet Moran performed Kostick's modern version of Homer's Odyssey.

In 2020, Hardwicke played Rob Hegarty, Connell's (Paul Mescal) school friend, in the BBC Three and Hulu adaptation of Sally Rooney's Normal People. He then had a recurring role in the RTÉ crime drama Smother in 2021.

In 2022, Hardwicke joined the cast of the Netflix series Fate: The Winx Saga for its second season and starred in the sports drama film Lakelands, the latter of which earned him and Danielle Galligan the Galway Film Fleadh's Bingham Ray New Talent Award, in addition to IFTA nominations. He also appeared in The Sparrow and played a younger version of Stanley Townsend's character in the film About Joan. He played Roy Keane in the 2025 film Saipan.

Hardwicke played Ben Field in the BBC One series The Sixth Commandment and Silas in the Paramount+ adaptation of Elizabeth Macneal's The Doll Factory. In 2026, he can be seen in the 1980s-set film Ancestors.

== Acting credits ==
=== Film ===
Key
†	Denotes films that have not yet been released

Year	Title	Role	Notes
2009	The Eclipse	Thomas Farr	
2019	Vivarium	Older Boy	
2021	At Arm's Length	Young Man	Short film; writer, producer
2022	About Joan	Young Doug	
2022	Lakelands	Cian Reilly	
2022	The Sparrow	Robbie	
2022	Lamb	Paul	Short film
2024	William Tell	Young Tell	
2025	Saipan	Roy Keane	
2026	No Ordinary Heist	Barry McKenna	
2026	Ancestors †	Beau	Post-production
TBA	To Make Ends Meat †	TBA	Post-production
TBA	Isle of Man †	TBA	Filming

=== Television ===
Year	Title	Role	Notes
2019	Krypton	Sagitari Lan-Dy	Episode: "In Zod We Trust"
2020	Normal People	Rob Hegarty	5 episodes
2021–2023	Smother	Joe Ryan	17 episodes
2022	Fate: The Winx Saga	Sebastian Valtor	7 episodes
2023	The Sixth Commandment	Ben Field	4 episodes
2023	The Doll Factory	Silas Reed	6 episodes
2024	A Very Royal Scandal	Stewart MacLean	3 episodes

=== Theatre ===
Year	Title	Role	Notes
2019	The Misfit Mythology	Oisín	Cork Arts Theatre
2020	The Mouth of the Birch	Joseph	Druid Theatre Company
2020	Attachment	Gavin	Dublin Theatre Festival
2025	The Playboy of the Western World	Christy	National Theatre

=== Audio ===
- The Odyssey: A New Version (2019), Irish Theatre Podcast
- Intermezzo (2024), Faber and Faber
- In Every Possible Way (2026), Berkley

== Awards and nominations ==
Year	Award	Category	Work	Result	Ref.
2021	Irish Film & Television Awards	Actor in a Supporting Role – Drama	Smother	Nominated	
2022	Galway Film Fleadh	Bingham Ray New Talent Award	Lakelands	Won	(Note: Shared with Danielle Galligan.)
2023	Irish Film & Television Awards	Lead Actor – Film	Lakelands	Nominated	
2024	Royal Television Society Programme Award	Supporting Actor - Male	The Sixth Commandment	Won	
2024	Irish Film & Television Awards	Supporting Actor – Drama	The Sixth Commandment	Won	
2024	British Academy Television Awards	Best Supporting Actor	The Sixth Commandment	Nominated	
2025	Ian Charleson Awards		Cherry Orchard	3rd	

== See also ==
- List of Irish actors
