= St John's Church, Colston Bassett =

Nottinghamshire Anglican church

Coordinates: 52°53′32″N 00°57′41″W

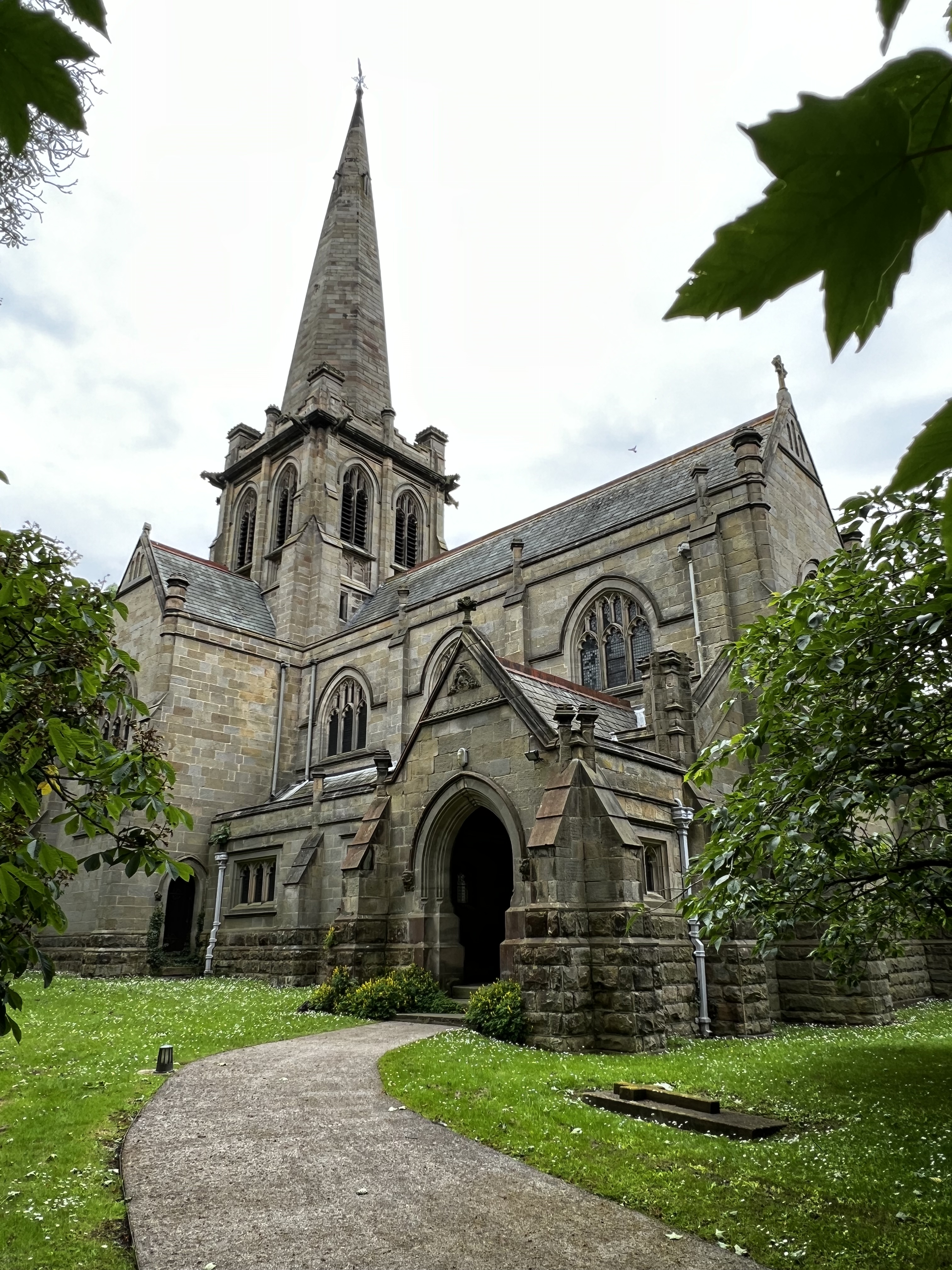
- St John's Church, Colston Bassett
- St John's Church, Colston Bassett
- Country: England
- Denomination: Church of England
- Churchmanship: Broad Church
- Website: www.wivertoninthevale.co.uk/saint-john-the-divine-colston-bassett/

History
- Dedication: St. John
- Consecrated: 2 August 1892

Architecture
- Heritage designation: Grade II listed
- Architect: Arthur Brewill
- Architectural type: Gothic
- Years built: 1892

Administration
- Province: York
- Diocese: Southwell and Nottingham
- Archdeaconry: Nottingham
- Deanery: East Bingham
- Benefice: Wiverton in the Vale
- Parish: Colston Bassett

St John's Church, Colston Bassett is an English parish church of the Church of England in Colston Bassett, Nottinghamshire. It is Grade II listed by the Department for Digital, Culture, Media and Sport as a building of special architectural or historic interest.

== History ==
St John's Church, Colston Bassett, was built in 1892 by the architect Arthur Brewill at the behest of Robert Millington Knowles of Colston Bassett Hall, High Sheriff of Nottinghamshire. The contractors were Bell and Sons. Five bells were removed from the old church and installed in the tower with a chiming apparatus. The east window was filled with stained glass by Heaton, Butler and Bayne. The pulpit was presented by Major Day of Kingussie (formerly of Colston Bassett Hall), with an upper portion in oak and the lower portion in Cosham Down Bath stone. It was designed by the architect and constructed by Oldham and Knight of Nottingham. The font was the gift of W.K. Marriott, of the Manor House, Barking, Essex, in memory of his parents. The lectern was funded by subscriptions from the parishioners and obtained from Whippel and Co.

However, the work of 1892 was of poor quality and the church soon needed restoration. This was begun in 1934 by Charles Marriott Oldrid Scott. The work involved restoration of the spire which had become fractured by the corrosion of iron cramps at a cost of £280 (equivalent to £17,100 in 2025). The western side of the church which was in danger of collapsing owing to the dilapidated conditions of the foundations was restored by Sir Edward and Lady Le Merchant at a cost of £1,000 (equivalent to £61,100 in 2025).

The building was reopened by the Bishop of Southwell, the Henry Mosley on 12 August 1936, while instituting a new vicar, the Rev. John Booth.

St John's replaced an earlier parish church dedicated to St Mary, which had become ruined and was further from the village. Substantial remains of it can still be seen and are listed Grade 1 in the List of Buildings of Special Architectural or Historical Interest. They date from the Anglo-Saxon, Norman, Gothic (the building's greatest size was reached in 1470), and Georgian periods. The churchyard remains in use.

== War memorial cross ==
The churchyard contains a war memorial cross which is Grade II listed It was created by Farmer & Brindley and dedicated by the Bishop of Southwell on 22 May 1920. The cross is of Portland stone and is 12 feet (3.7 m) high. It bears the inscription:

To the memory of the men of Colston Bassett who gave their lives in the Great War 1914-1919. Arthur Anderson, Albert Birkin, Alfred Faulks, John Green, Albert Lane, Charles Newton, Ernest Parnham, Thomas Parnham, Alfred Richards, Robert Rogerson, Amos Shaw, Benjamin Sheppard, John Wagstaff, Edwin Westman.

== Current parish status ==
St John's Church, Colston Bassett is in the Wiverton group of parishes, which also includes:

- St Andrew's Church, Langar
- St Giles's Church, Cropwell Bishop
- All Saints' Church, Granby
- Holy Trinity Church, Tythby
- St Mary's Church, Barnstone (no longer in use)
- St Michael and All Angels' Church, Elton on the Hill

== Notable memorials ==
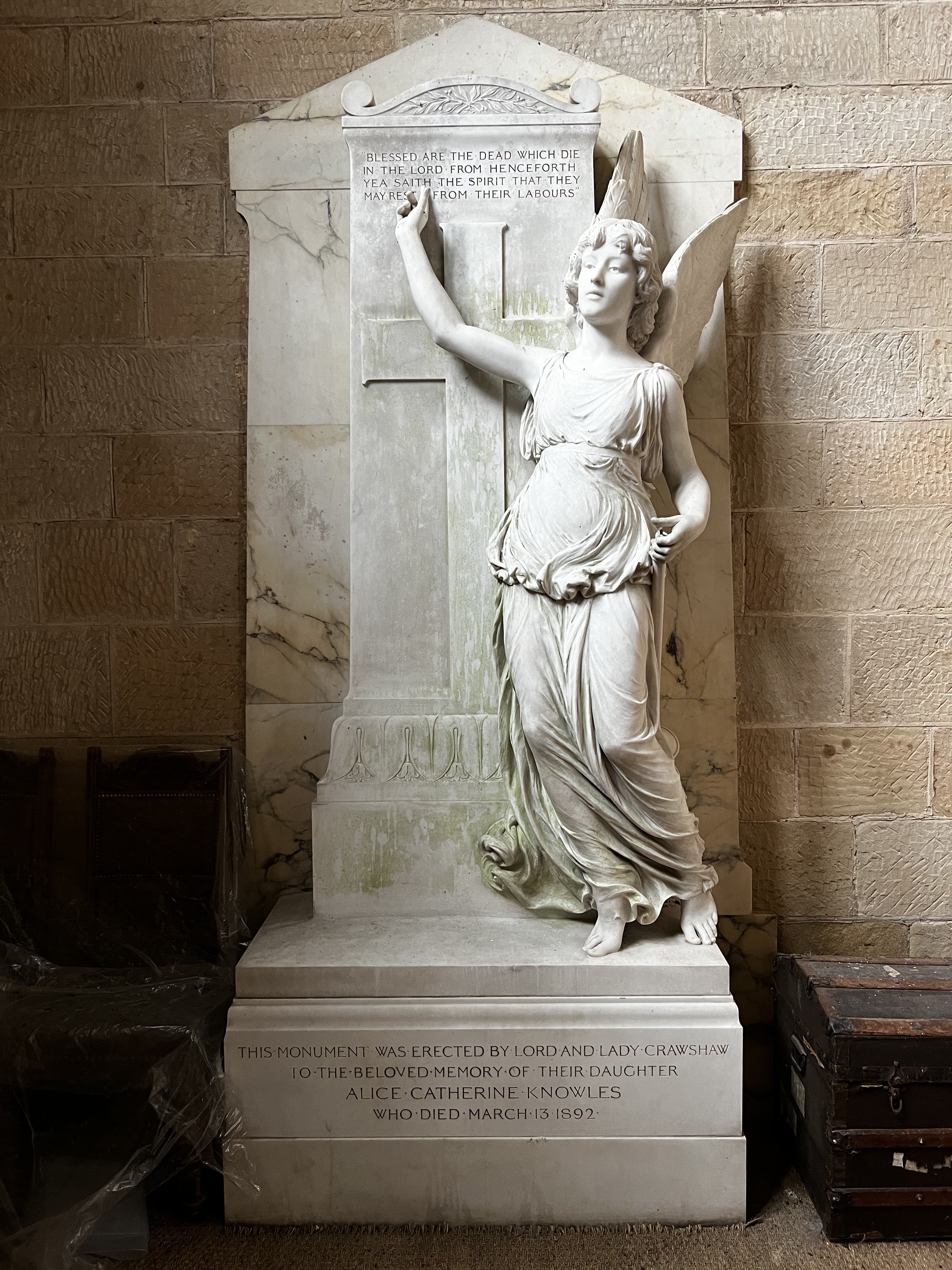
Memorial to Alice Catherine Knowles (d. 1892)

- Henry Martin (Kinsale MP) (d. 1839) and his wife Maria Elizabeth
- Revd. Joshua Brooke (d. 1888)
- Alice Catherine Knowles (d. 1892)
- John Haslam Knowles (d. 1890) and Lieut. Alfred Millington Knowles (d. 1900)
- Robert Millington Knowles (d. 1924)
- Brigadier General Sir Edward Thomas LeMarchant (d. 1953) and his wife Evelyn Brooks Knowles (d. 1957)

== Old Rectory ==
The Old Rectory dates from 1834 and was designed by Henry Moses Wood.

== See also ==
- Listed buildings in Colston Bassett
