= St Christopher's Church, Southbourne =

Church in Bournemouth, Dorset, England

St Christopher's Church
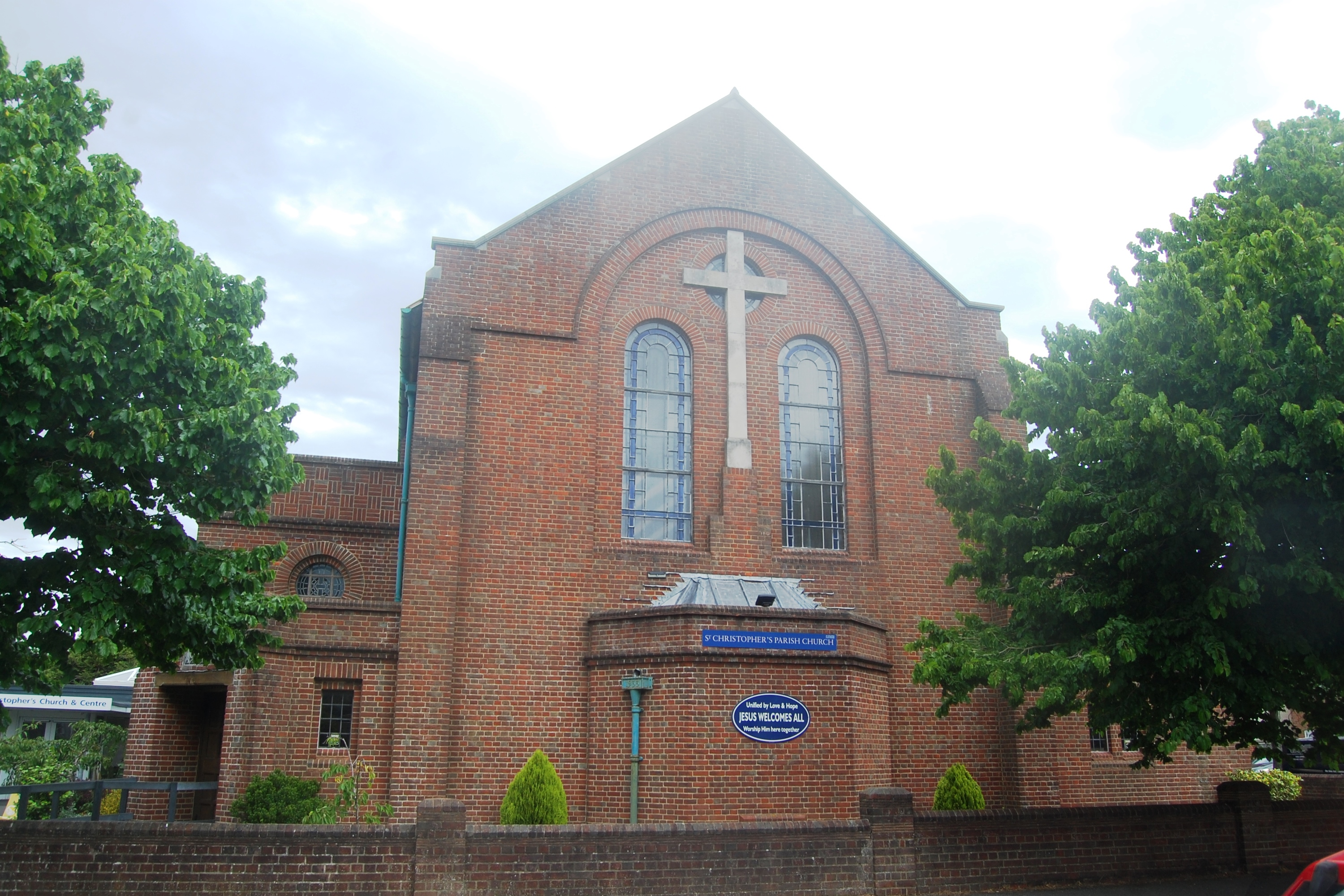
- St Mary's Church in 2022

Religion
- Affiliation: Anglicanism
- Ecclesiastical or organizational status: active

Location
- Location: Arnewood Road, Southbourne, Bournemouth, Dorset, England
- Interactive map of St Christopher's Church
- Coordinates: 50.731994°N 1.807353°W

Architecture
- Architect: Charles Marriott Oldrid Scott
- Type: Church
- Style: Romanesque Revival architecture
- Completed: 1932-1934

Website
- saint-christophers.org.uk

St Christopher's Church is a historic church in the Southbourne area of Bournemouth, Dorset, England.

== History ==
The church was built from 1932 to 1934 designed by architect Charles Marriott Oldrid Scott. The church is constructed with red brick and is part of the Anglican Communion. In 2024, it was reported that St Christopher's would merge with St Nicholas and Pokesdown All Saints to become the parish of Southbourne on Sea.

== See also ==
- List of churches in Bournemouth
- List of Anglican churches
