= The Eclipse (2009 film) =

- Promotional film poster
- Directed by: Conor McPherson
- Written by: Conor McPherson and Billy Roche
- Produced by: Robert Walpole
- Starring: Ciarán Hinds; Iben Hjejle; Aidan Quinn
- Cinematography: Ivan McCullough
- Edited by: Emer Reynolds
- Music by: Fionnuala Ní Chiosáin
- Production companies: Treasure Entertainment; Broadcasting Commission of Ireland; Irish Film Board; RTÉ
- Distributed by: Treasure Entertainment
- Release date: 24 April 2009 (Tribeca)
- Running time: 88 minutes
- Country: Ireland
- Language: English

The Eclipse is a 2009 Irish supernatural drama film written by Billy Roche and Conor McPherson, and directed by Conor McPherson and starring Ciarán Hinds, Iben Hjejle, Éanna Hardwicke and Aidan Quinn.

== Premise ==
Michael Farr (Ciarán Hinds) is a depressed widower who works as a teacher in the small seaside town of Cobh, in County Cork, Ireland, where he lives with his two children. While he continues to adjust to life without his beloved wife, who died two years earlier, he begins to experience strange, possibly supernatural occurrences connected to his elderly father-in-law, who is close to death in a local nursing home.

When Michael volunteers at the town's annual literary festival, he is assigned to look after Lena Morrell (Iben Hjejle). Lena is known for her ghost stories, and Michael, impressed with the realistic nature of her writing, shares his recent experiences with her. While Michael and Lena grow closer, another famous author, Nicholas Holden (Aidan Quinn), a married man with a scandalous reputation, arrives in town for the festival, hoping to rekindle a brief affair he had with Lena a year before. As Michael and Nicholas clash over Lena's affections, Michael's supernatural visions grow more vivid and disturbing.

== Cast ==
- Ciarán Hinds as Michael Farr
- Iben Hjejle as Lena Morrell
- Aidan Quinn as Nicholas Holden
- Éanna Hardwicke as Thomas Farr
- Hannah Lynch as Sarah Farr
- Jim Norton as Malachy
- Billy Roche as Jim Belton
- Hilary O'Shaughnessy as TV Interviewer

== Production ==
It was filmed in Cobh, County Cork.

== Release ==
It premiered at the Tribeca Film Festival on 24 April 2009 where, after reports of interest from several studios, Magnolia Pictures secured worldwide distribution rights for the film. The film aired on Irish public-service broadcaster RTÉ One on 17 March 2010.

It was released in Australian cinemas in April 2010.

== Reception ==
On the review aggregator website Rotten Tomatoes, 77% of 83 critics' reviews are positive, with an average rating of 6.7/10. The website's consensus reads: "An intriguingly unusual ghost story, Conor McPherson's Eclipse blends supernatural suspense with romance to create a satisfying, character-driven whole." Metacritic, which uses a weighted average, assigned the film a score of 67 out of 100, based on 21 critics, indicating "generally favorable" reviews.

== Awards ==
- Méliès D'Argent Award for Best European Film
- Best Film & Best Screenplay Awards 2010 for Billy Roche and Conor McPherson at the Irish Film & Television Academy Awards
- Best Actor Award for Ciarán Hinds 2009 Tribeca Film Festival
- Best Supporting Actor Award for Aidan Quinn 2010 Irish Film & Television Academy Awards
