= The Sixth Commandment (TV series) =

2023 British Television series

- Genre: True crime drama
- Created by: Sarah Phelps
- Written by: Sarah Phelps
- Directed by: Saul Dibb
- Starring: Timothy Spall; Anne Reid; Sheila Hancock; Éanna Hardwicke; Annabel Scholey; Ben Bailey Smith
- Music by: Rael Jones
- Country of origin: United Kingdom
- Original language: English
- No. of series: 1
- No. of episodes: 4

Production
- Executive producers: Lucy Richter; Derek Wax; Sarah Phelps; Brian Woods
- Producer: Frances du Pille
- Cinematography: Rik Zang
- Editors: Sarah Peczek; Steven Worsley
- Running time: 57 minutes
- Production companies: Wild Mercury Productions; True Vision Productions

Original release
- Network: BBC One
- Release: 17 July – 25 July 2023

The Sixth Commandment is a four-part British true crime drama television series, written by Sarah Phelps and directed by Saul Dibb. Based on the deaths of Peter Farquhar and Ann Moore-Martin, it stars Timothy Spall, Anne Reid, Sheila Hancock, Éanna Hardwicke, Annabel Scholey, and Ben Bailey Smith. Produced by Wild Mercury Productions and True Vision Productions, the series began to air on BBC One on 17 July 2023.

== Synopsis ==
The story explores the narcissistic manipulation and murder of Peter Farquhar and the death of his neighbour Ann Moore-Martin in the Buckinghamshire village of Maids Moreton in 2015 and 2017, and the fall out from these events including the police investigation and 2019 criminal trial of Ben Field and Martyn Smith.

== Cast ==
- Timothy Spall as Peter Farquhar
- Anne Reid as Ann Moore-Martin
- Éanna Hardwicke as Ben Field
- Annabel Scholey as Anne-Marie Blake
- Sheila Hancock as Elizabeth Zettl
- Ben Bailey Smith as Simon Blake
- Conor MacNeill as Martyn Smith
- Adrian Rawlins as Ian Farquhar
- Amanda Root as Sue Farquhar
- Jonathan Aris as DCI Mark Glover
- Rick Warden as Oliver Saxby
- Peter Sullivan as David Jeremy
- Anna Crilly as DS Natalie Golding

== Production ==
=== Development ===
The project was first announced in November 2020 by the BBC to “explore the death of Mr Farquhar and the gaslighting campaign of physical and mental abuse he was made to endure at the hands of church warden Benjamin Field”. Sarah Phelps was writing the screenplay.

In June 2022 the project was announced as moving forward with Wild Mercury Productions and True Vision Productions making the four-part series for BBC One. It is directed by Saul Dibb, from a Phelps script, with production by Frances du Pille. The project is executive produced by Derek Wax, Brian Woods and Lucy Richer as well as Dibbs and Phelps. It was confirmed that the project had the full co-operation of the families of Peter Farquhar and Ann Moore-Martin.

=== Casting ===
In June 2022 Timothy Spall, Anne Reid, Éanna Hardwicke, Annabel Scholey and Sheila Hancock were announced as the lead cast.

=== Filming ===
Filming took place in Bristol and Bath, Somerset from July 2022. The shoot lasted three months for Hardwicke.

== Episodes ==
No.	Title	Directed by	Written by	Original release date	UK viewers (millions)
1	"Episode 1"	Saul Dibb	Sarah Phelps	17 July 2023	5.26
2	"Episode 2"	Saul Dibb	Sarah Phelps	18 July 2023	4.71
3	"Episode 3"	Saul Dibb	Sarah Phelps	24 July 2023	4.90
4	"Episode 4"	Saul Dibb	Sarah Phelps	25 July 2023	5.22

== Release ==
The series went to air on BBC One on 17 July 2023.

Irish broadcaster RTE also hold rights for the show, airing it on their main channel RTÉ One and streaming service RTÉ Player.

== Reception ==
=== Critical reception ===
On the review aggregator website Rotten Tomatoes, The Sixth Commandment holds an approval rating of 88%.

Lucy Mangan of The Guardian awarded the first episode five stars out of five, praising the writing, directing and performances. Ed Power of The Daily Telegraph gave it four out of five stars, also praising the performances and saying the drama 'never forgets Field’s victims were real and suffered horribly'. In a more critical review, Nick Hilton of The Independent gave it two out of five stars.

=== Accolades ===
The series was nominated in the Best Casting category at the 2023 Royal Television Society Craft & Design Awards.

The series received four nominations at the Royal Television Society Programme Awards in March 2024, for Best Limited Series, Phelps for Writer - Drama, Spall for Leading Actor, and Hardwicke for Supporting Actor. Phelps, and Hardwicke were both winners, and the series won in the Limited Drama category.

In May 2024, the series won Best Limited Drama category at the 2024 British Academy Television Awards, with Spall winning Best Actor. Reid was also nominated for Best Actress and Hardwicke for Best Supporting Actor.

In April 2024, Hardwicke won the Best Actor award at the IFTA Film & Drama Awards. Spall was nominated for Best Drama Actor and Phelps for Best Writer at the 2024 Broadcasting Press Guild Awards.
