= Maids Moreton =

Village in Buckinghamshire, England

Coordinates: 52.014°N 0.972°W

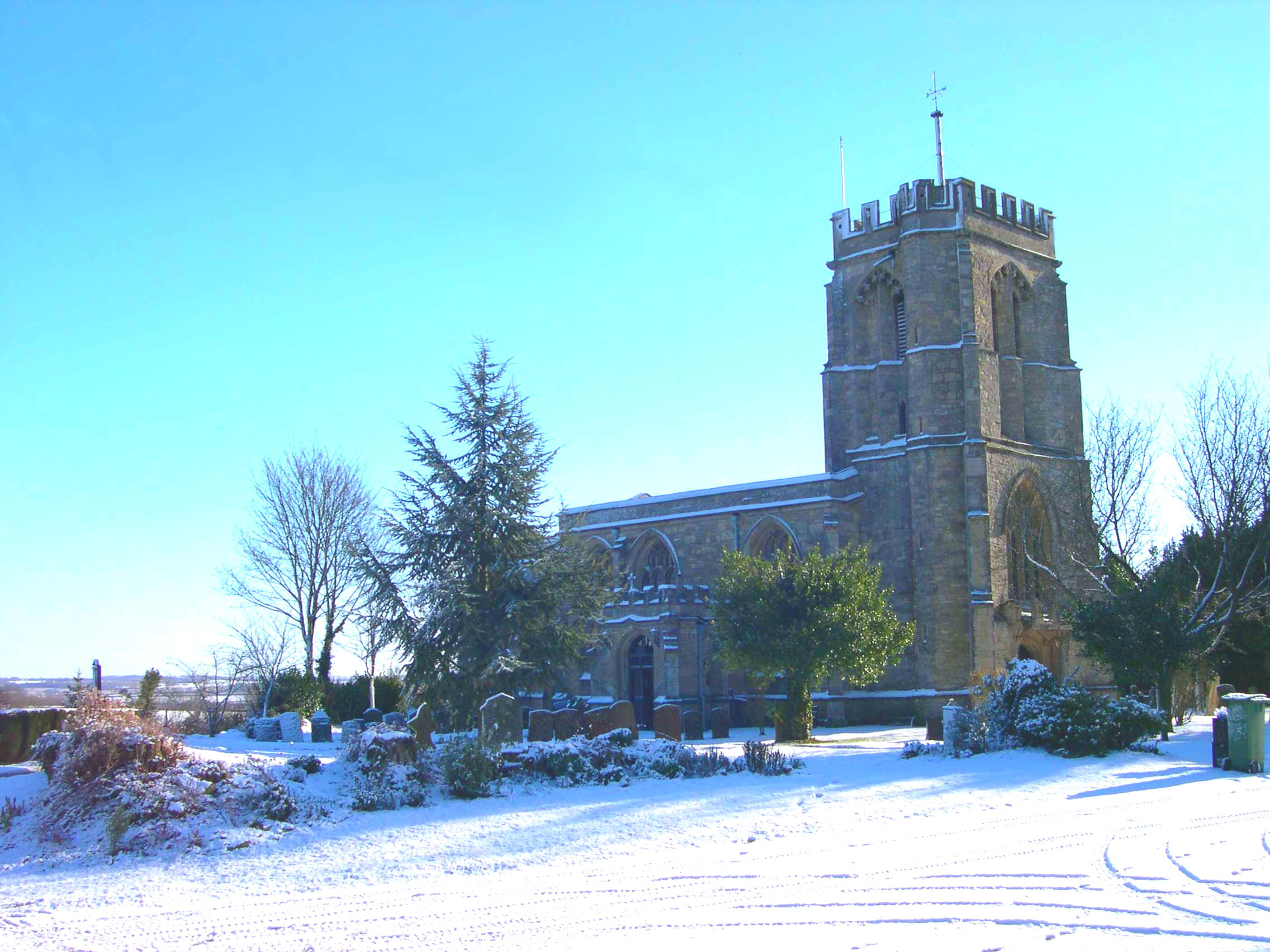
- St. Edmund's Parish Church

- Location within Buckinghamshire
- Interactive map of Maids Moreton
- Population: 857 (2021 census)
- OS grid reference: SP7035
- Civil parish: Maids Moreton
- Unitary authority: Buckinghamshire
- Ceremonial county: Buckinghamshire
- Region: South East
- Country: England
- Sovereign state: United Kingdom
- Post town: BUCKINGHAM
- Postcode district: MK18
- Dialling code: 01280
- Police: Thames Valley
- Fire: Buckinghamshire
- Ambulance: South Central
- UK Parliament: Buckingham and Bletchley
- Website: Maids Moreton Parish Council

Maids Moreton is a village and civil parish in north-west Buckinghamshire, England, around 1 mile (1.6 km) north of Buckingham. The village centre sits on top of a plateau overlooking Buckingham (with which it is contiguous) and is about 1/2 mile (about 1km) away from the Foxcote Reservoir SSSI.

== Description and history ==
The parish of Maids Moreton covers about 1,365 acres (552 ha) of which 376 acres (152 ha) are arable, 786 acres (318 ha) permanent grass and 26 acres (11 ha) woods and plantations. The soil is mostly clay and gravel and the subsoil gravel.

The village lies along the Buckingham to Towcester road (A413). It contains many 17th-century houses and cottages with timber frames with brick or plaster filling and thatched roofs.

The 15th-century parish church of Saint Edmund is said to have been built by two maiden ladies of the Pever family hence the name "Maids' Moreton". The Maids' memorials are a wall painting over the north door and brasses on a slab just within the doorway.

The old post office, situated at the junction of Main Street with the A413, closed in the mid-1990s and is now a private house. The chapel (on the A413) was demolished in the early 1980s and the allotments next to the chapel were all used for new housing.

In October 2019, Ben Field was jailed for the murder of Maids Moreton resident Peter Farquhar in 2015. Field was also accused of attempted murder of another Maids Moreton resident, Ann Moore-Martin, but was found not guilty. The case was dramatised in the 2023 BBC series The Sixth Commandment.

== Population ==
At the 2021 census, the population of the parish was 857. This may be compared with its population of 847 at the 2011 census.

As of June 2025, residents of Maids Moreton were contesting two greenfield planning applications to build 163 and 15 houses increasing the village size by 50%. David Wilson Homes, a subsidiary of Barrett Developments, were planning to build 163 houses in planning application 16/00151/AOP. This was challenged at judicial review in 2022, and successfully defended by the Buckinghamshire Council. The planning application is notable for having seven different sets of Biodiversity Net Gain figures.

== School ==
Maids Moreton Church of England School is a mixed Church of England voluntary controlled primary school. The school takes children between the ages of four and seven and has about 50 pupils.
