= Colston Bassett =

Village and civil parish in Nottinghamshire, England

Coordinates: 52.893°N 0.961°W

- Village and civil parish
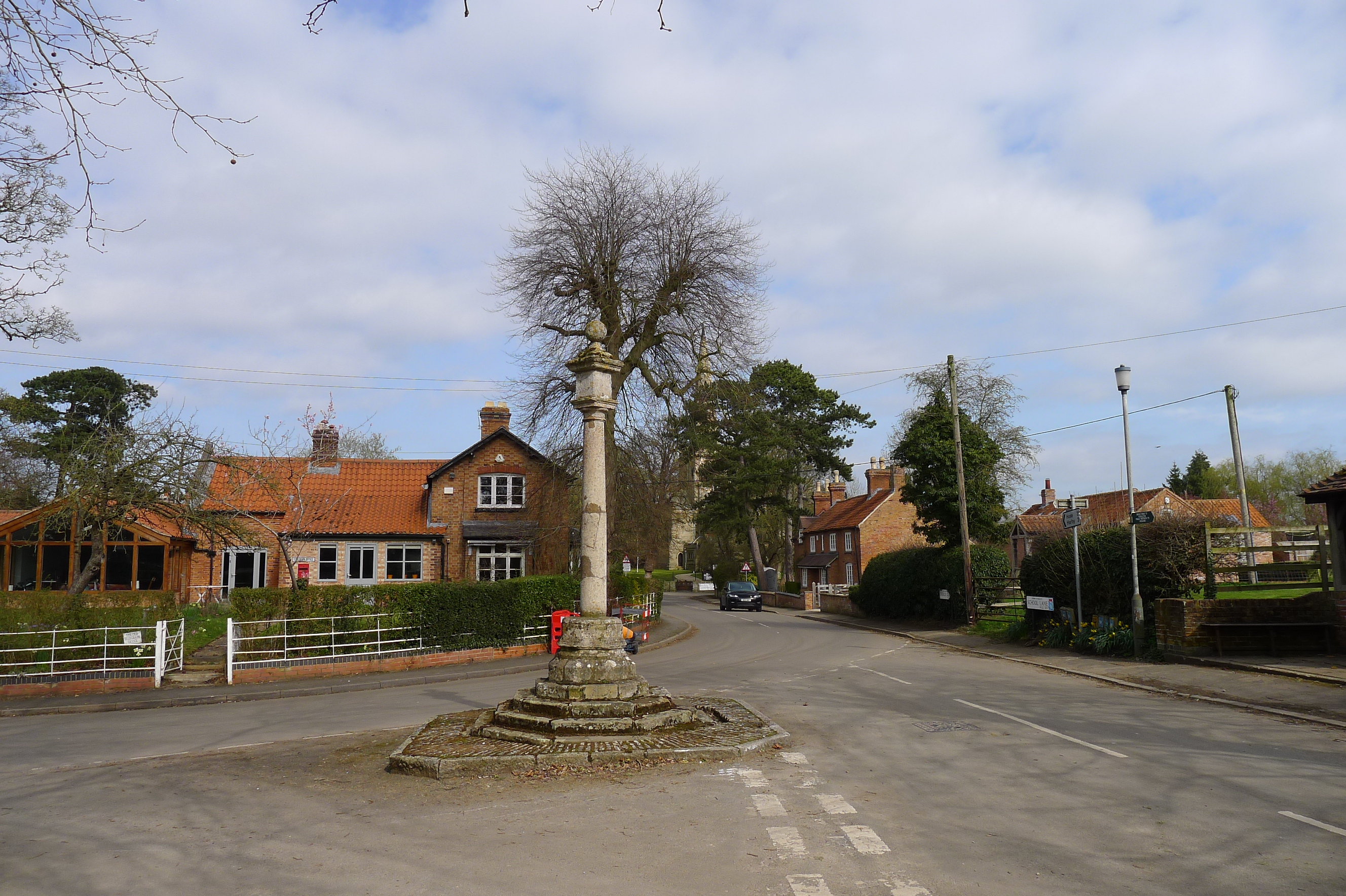
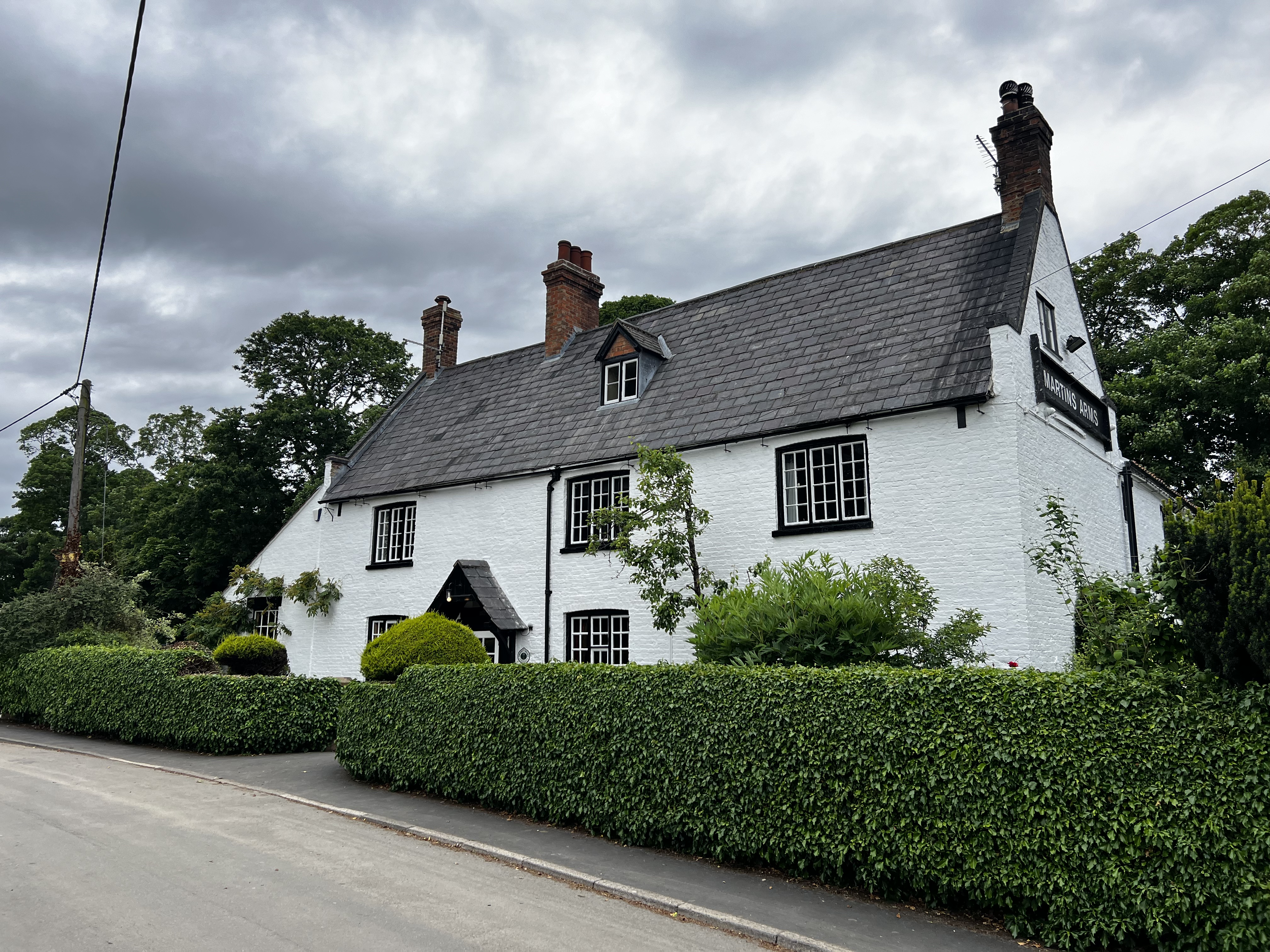
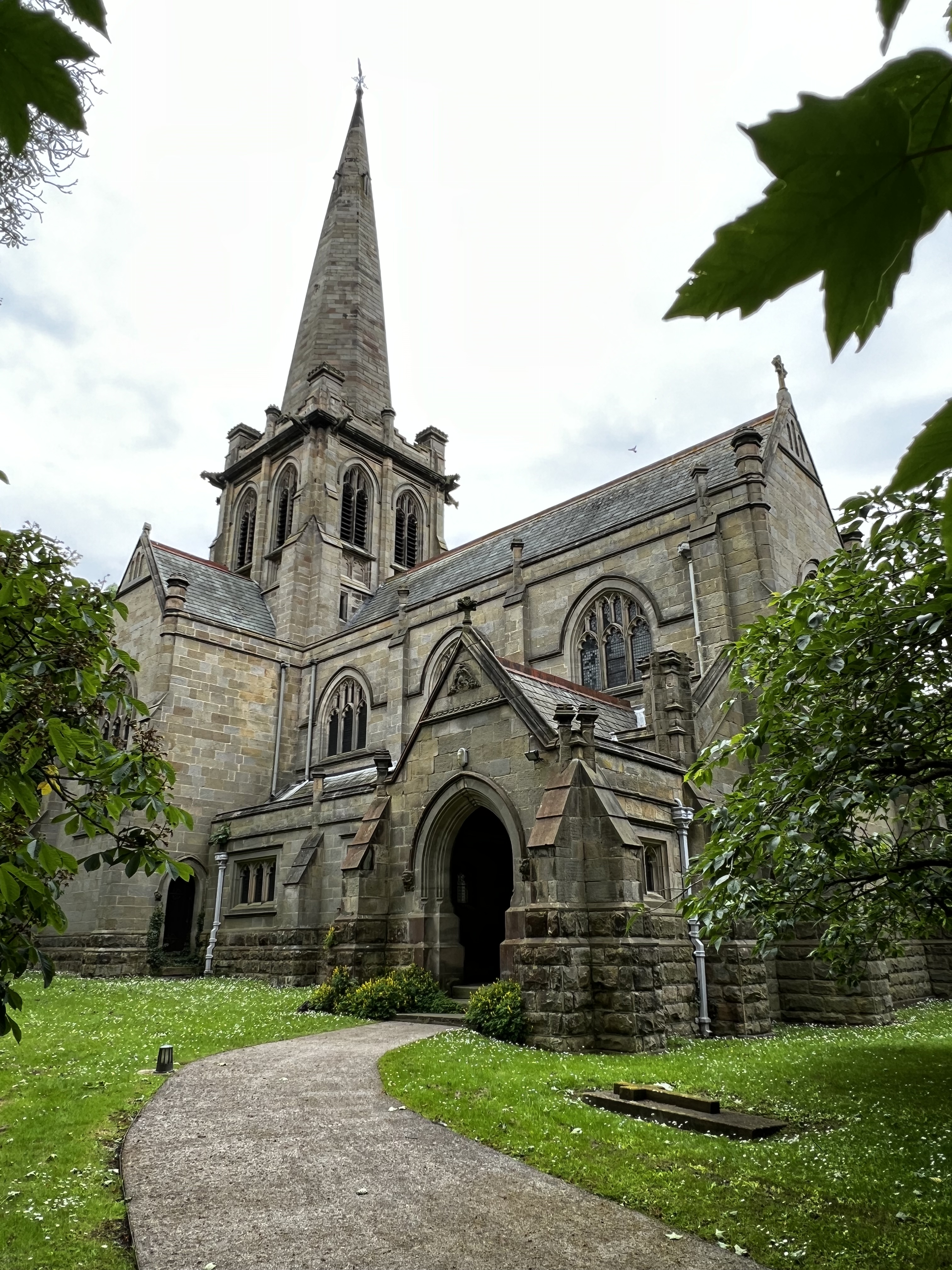
- Village Centre Martins Arms St John’s Church

- Location within Nottinghamshire
- Interactive map of Colston Bassett
- Area: 3.84 sq mi (9.9 km^{2})
- Population: 356 (2021 Census)
  - Density: 93/sq mi (36/km^{2})
- OS grid reference: SK 700333
  - London: 100 mi (160 km) SSE
- District: Rushcliffe
- Shire county: Nottinghamshire
- Region: East Midlands
- Country: England
- Sovereign state: United Kingdom
- Post town: NOTTINGHAM
- Postcode district: NG12
- Dialling code: 01949
- Police: Nottinghamshire
- Fire: Nottinghamshire
- Ambulance: East Midlands
- UK Parliament: Rushcliffe
- Website: colstonbassettparishcouncil.co.uk

Colston Bassett is an English village in the Vale of Belvoir, in the Rushcliffe district of southeast Nottinghamshire, close to its border with Leicestershire. It lies by the River Smite. The population in 2001 of 225, including Wiverton Hall, increased to 399 at the 2011 Census, finally falling to 356 in the 2021 Census.

== Place name and history ==
The name, first recorded in the Domesday Book as Coletone, is from the Old Norse personal name Kolr (genitive Kols), and the Old English tūn "farm or village", and so means "Kolr's farm or village". Alternatively, it has been suggested that it derives from Cole meaning "coal" or "stone". The suffix Bassett is from the holder of the estate in the 12th century, Ralph Bassett, a judge appointed by Henry I.

The history of the village is recorded in some detail in the publication A History of Colston Bassett by Rev. Evelyn Young, edited for the Thoroton Society in 1942 by Thomas M. Blagg. The First World War cost the village at least 14 lives, listed on the war memorial in St John's Church.

== Amenities ==
The village dairy, which opened in 1913, is one of only five that are permitted to name their blue cheese Stilton cheese. It also manufactures smaller quantities of White Stilton and Shropshire Blue.

Colston Bassett contains an old market cross, a ruined church of St Mary, Colston Bassett Preparatory School for children between 4–11 years, a pub, the Martins Arms, a riding school, and animal boarding kennels.

There is a Karate club which takes place at the Colston Bassett Preparatory School, Colston Bassett Shotokan Karate Club (CBSKC) established in 2016 which is a KUGB affiliated club.

The parish church is St John's Church.

== Transport ==
Colston Bassett has weekday, daytime bus services to Radcliffe on Trent and Nottingham. The nearest railway stations are at Radcliffe (4.1 miles, 6.6 km) and Bingham (5.7 miles, 9 km), with hourly or two-hourly services to and beyond Nottingham and Grantham.

The A46 trunk road between Leicester and Newark on Trent passes 1.9 miles (3 km) to the west of the village, and the A52 between Nottingham and Grantham 5.6 miles (9 km) to the north. The M1 motorway between London and Leeds can be reached at Junction 25 (24 miles, 39 km).

== See also ==
- Listed buildings in Colston Bassett
