= Foxcote Reservoir and Wood =

48.3-hectare wildlife site with reservoir and woodland

Coordinates: 52.021°N 0.965°W

- Site of Special Scientific Interest
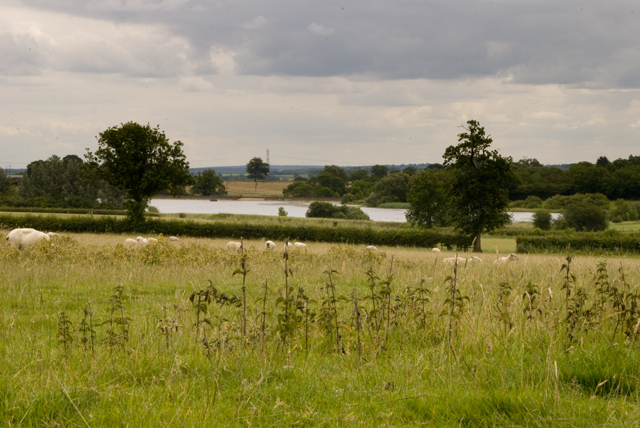
- Location of Foxcote Reservoir and Wood.
- Area of search: Buckinghamshire
- Grid reference: SP711364
- Interest: Biological
- Area: 48.3 ha (119 acres)
- Notification date: 1984
- Location map: Magic Map

Foxcote Reservoir and Wood is a 48.3-hectare (119-acre) biological Site of Special Scientific Interest between Akeley and Maids Moreton in Buckinghamshire, England. An area of 34 hectares is managed by the Berkshire, Buckinghamshire and Oxfordshire Wildlife Trust.

The reservoir was created in 1956 by damming a small tributary of the River Great Ouse, and is important for wintering wildfowl, especially shoveler ducks and Bewick's swans. The area around the reservoir has woodland, meadows and ponds. Plants include the greater butterfly orchid and the herb Paris quadrifolia.
