= Chaworth =

Chaworth is a surname. Notable people with the surname include:

- Joan Chaworth
- Bridget Chaworth (died 1621), gentlewoman of the Privy Chamber to Elizabeth I
- Maud Chaworth (1282–1322), English noblewoman and heiress
- Viscount Chaworth
- Baron Chaworth
