= Listed buildings in Annesley =

Annesley is a civil parish in the Ashfield District of Nottinghamshire, England. The parish contains seven listed buildings that are recorded in the National Heritage List for England. Of these, one is listed at Grade I, the highest of the three grades, one is at Grade II*, the middle grade, and the others are at Grade II, the lowest grade. The parish contains the village of Annesley and the surrounding area. All the listed buildings are outside the village itself, and most are centred round the Ruins of Annesley Old Church and the ruined Annesley Hall, which are both listed together with associated structures. The active All Saints' Church, to the north of this area, is also listed.

== Key ==
Grade	Criteria
I	Buildings of exceptional interest, sometimes considered to be internationally important
II*	Particularly important buildings of more than special interest
II	Buildings of national importance and special interest

== Buildings ==
Name and location	Photograph	Date	Notes	Grade
Ruins of Annesley Old Church; 53.06618°N 1.25005°W		12th century	The church has been altered and extended through the centuries and is now a roofless ruin. It is in stone, and consists of a nave, a south aisle, a chancel, and a west tower. The tower has a single stage, coved eaves and the remains of a parapet, and at the northwest corner is a canted stair turret.	I
Annesley Hall; 53.06571°N 1.24977°W		Mid 13th century	A country house that has been altered and extended through the centuries, but has been damaged by fire and is derelict. It is in stone and brick on chamfered plinths, and has moulded string courses, a moulded coped parapet and slate roofs with gables and kneelers. There are three storeys and a U-shaped plan, with a front of six bays, and there is a two-storey stair turret. The windows vary, and include sashes, casements, some of which are mullioned, and Venetian windows.	II
Terrace, Annesley Hall; 53.06562°N 1.25052°W	—	Late 17th century	The terrace is in brick with stone dressings, and is in two stages with eight bays. The lower stage has a central double stair with square newels and ball finials to a balustrade. Under the stairs is a chamfered doorway leading to a barrel vaulted chamber. The upper stage has a pair of brick gate piers with stone quoins, and wrought iron gates with latticed posts and an overthrow. The wall has a scalloped top and contains piers, some with ball finials.	II
Gate pier, South Lodge; 53.05719°N 1.23192°W		Late 17th century	The remaining gate pier of the south lodge of Annesley Hall is in stone and brick. It has a chamfered square base, a square column with quoins, a moulded cornice, and a curved pedestal with a ball finial.	II
Gatehouse Range, Annesley Hall; 53.06637°N 1.24907°W		c. 1838	A range of buildings including stables, a dairy and a coach house. They are in stone on chamfered plinths, with moulded eaves, and slate roofs with coped shaped gables and kneelers. There are two storeys, and an L-shaped plan with a front of twelve bays. The windows are mainly cross windows and mullioned casements, and most of the doors have four-centred arched heads. To the west is an arched carriage entrance, and there is a gatehouse with a moulded arch containing a clock, and an octagonal lantern with a wind vane.	II
Annesley Lodge; 53.06757°N 1.24963°W		Mid 19th century	The lodge, later a private house, is in stone and brick on a chamfered plinth, with quoins, chamfered and dentilled eaves, and a tile roof with coped gables, kneelers and finials. There are two storeys, a double depth plan, and two bays. The windows are mullioned with casements, and on two fronts are canted bay windows. The porch is gabled, it has a four-centred arched doorway, and behind it is a canted stair turret with an octagonal upper stage and a pyramidal roof.	II
All Saints' Church; 53.07741°N 1.23862°W		1874	Much of the church was rebuilt in 1907 following a fire. It is built in stone with Westmorland slate roofs, and consists of a nave with a clerestory, north and south aisles, a north porch, a chancel with vestries, and a northeast steeple. The steeple has a tower with three stages, two string courses, corner buttresses, and a square stair turret. In the bottom stage is a doorway with a segmental head, there are rectangular windows in the middle stage, in the top stage are two-light bell openings with Y-tracery, and the tower is surmounted by an octagonal broach spire with lucarnes, a finial and a weathercock.	II*
