= Mansfield and Pinxton Railway =

Historic railway linking two areas

Coordinates: 53°07′57″N 1°13′28″W

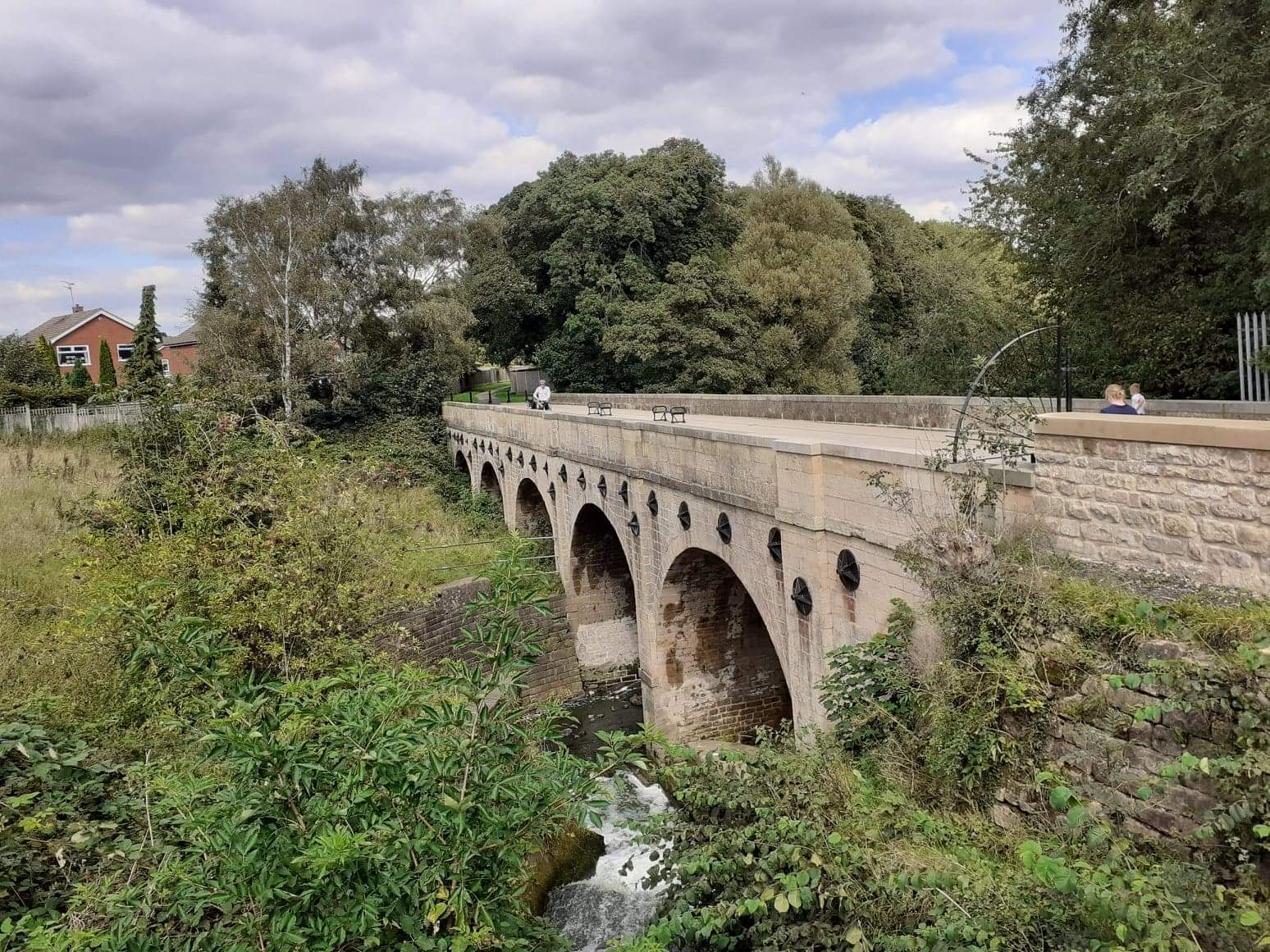
The Mansfield and Pinxton Railway viaduct over the River Maun outfall from the mill-pond originally powering the old King's Mill, looking towards Mansfield

The Mansfield and Pinxton Railway was an early horse-drawn railway in the United Kingdom. It was completed in 1819, to make a transport link between Mansfield and the Cromford Canal at Pinxton. An important traffic was coal inward to Mansfield, as coal deposits near there were too deep to be extracted economically at the time; minerals, malt and other manufactures were exported from Mansfield. Collieries along the line of route were developed as time went on.

From 1847 the Midland Railway developed a railway network in the locality of Mansfield, and purchased the M&PR, converting it to be suitable for locomotive use and incorporating it in its own network.

In the second half of the twentieth century, passenger and ordinary goods business in the Mansfield area declined substantially, leaving only a limited coal traffic via Codnor Park from 1970. The passenger service from Nottingham to Mansfield was revived under the marketing title The Robin Hood Line, opening to Mansfield in 1995, using the section of the original M&PR, as modified by the Midland Railway, from Kirkby to Mansfield. The mineral traffic flow from Codnor Park continues.

== Conception ==
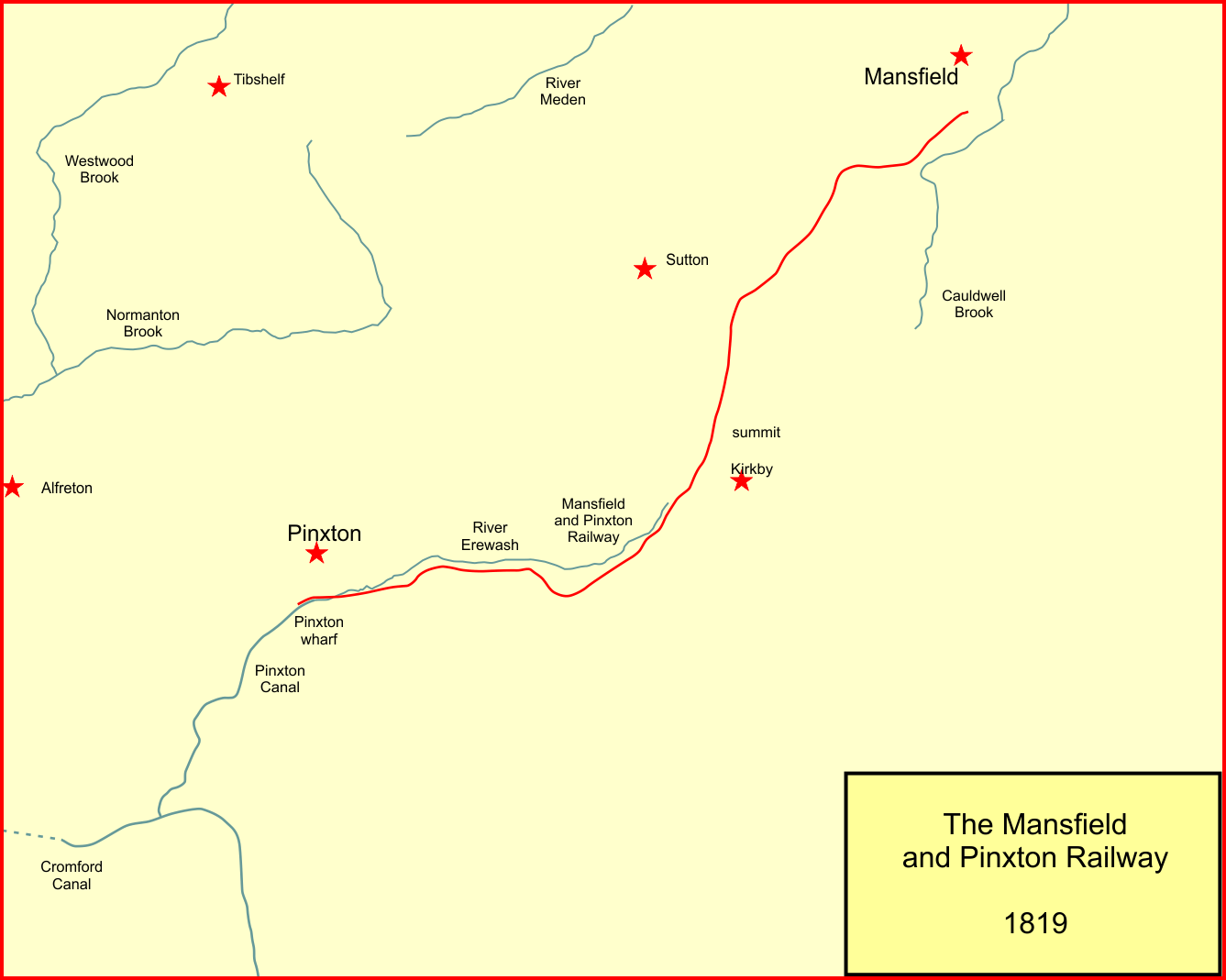
The Mansfield and Pinxton Railway in 1819

The canal age had resulted in a network that greatly reduced transport costs, but topography, in particular hilly terrain, left some localities deprived of the amenity. Mansfield had no canal; the nearest was the Pinxton basin of a branch of the Cromford canal, about 8 miles away. Mansfield’s industry was malting, and the manufacture of stockings and gloves, there were considerable limestone deposits, and sand particularly suited to moulding in cast iron manufacture. The lack of economical transport left Mansfield at a disadvantage in transporting its products to market. Pinxton was at the eastern edge of coal deposits at practicable depths at the time, so the coal consumed in Mansfield had to be brought in.

Mansfield and Pinxton Railway Act 1817
- Act of Parliament
- Parliament of the United Kingdom
- Long title: An Act for making and maintaining a Railing or Tram Road from Bull's Head Lane. in the Parish of Mansfield. in the County of Nottingham. to communicate with the Cromford Canal at Pinxton Basin, in the Parish of Pinxton, in the County of Derby.
- Citation: 57 Geo. 3. c. xxxvii

Dates
- Royal assent: 16 June 1817

Text of statute as originally enacted

Business interests in Mansfield saw the desirability of a railway connection to the town and promoted a line from the Pinxton basin of the Cromford Canal to Mansfield. The Mansfield and Pinxton Railway was authorised by the Mansfield and Pinxton Railway Act 1817 (57 Geo. 3. c. xxxvii) of 16 June 1817. Unlike many tramway extensions to canals, it was authorised independently. Its declared purpose was to convey heavy minerals, chiefly coal, lead and limestone at first, to and from the Pinxton basin of the Cromford canal. Pinxton was at the eastern edge of coal deposits at practicable depths at the time, so the coal was to be brought into Mansfield. The hilly terrain predisposed against extension of the canal. The authorised capital was £22,800. Immediately after authorisation a meeting of the proprietors took place, indicating that businesspeople had already committed to funding the construction, and no general invitation to subscribe was required.

Josias Jessop was the engineer of the project. Construction evidently proceeded rapidly, but there was a cost overrun. At a meeting held on 18 December 1818 it was said that an additional £7,600 was needed to complete the railway.

== Opening and early operation ==
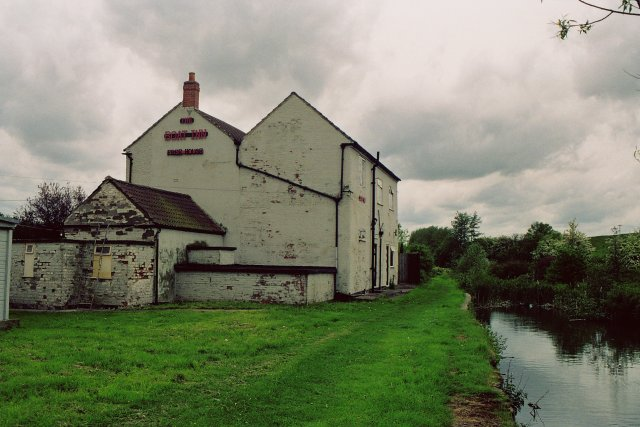
Pinxton Wharf. Tickets to travel on the railway could be bought at the Boat Inn

The line was opened on 13 April 1819, when "the first load of coals was brought in to the Company's wharf [at Mansfield]... the coal was unloaded and taken to the market place where it was heaped up and set on fire." This was evidently a major event in the locality: crowds met the incoming train at the five-arch bridge "where they met ten waggons laden with coal from the Pinxton colliery... the assemblage amounted to some thousands... Having arrived at the market-place about three o'clock, which, not withstanding the heavy rain falling at the time was thronged with people, the band struck up "God Save the King"... Nearly three hundred of the workmen who had been employed during the last three months on the road, then returned to partake of a dinner, provided for them by the proprietors, at different public houses in the town."

The Mansfield terminal was Portland Wharf, alongside White Bear Lane. Bullocks were used as the motive power at first, and later horses were substituted. The railway was to be operated as a toll road: tonnage rates were set; owners of land adjacent to the line were to establish wharfs (goods sidings) and the company could step in if they failed to do so.

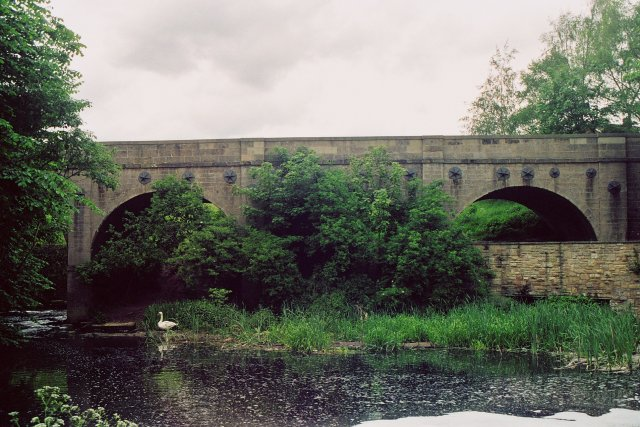
Kings Mill Viaduct carried the Mansfield and Pinxton Railway across a small stream. The viaduct now carries a footpath.

The line was double track, 8 1/4 miles long. From Mansfield to the summit level there was a rise of 89 ft; it then fell 181 feet (Note: Priestley says the fall was 80 feet 10 inches, but from other figures he gives, this must be a misprint for 180 ft 10in.) to the Pinxton terminal. The summit was a little under half way from Mansfield. The track consisted of fish-bellied cast iron edge rails; the rails used a form of scarfed joints on stone block sleepers. The selection of edge rails was not without controversy: plate rails (where the wagon wheels are plain and the plate provides the flange for containment) have the advantage that the wagons can leave the track and be manoeuvred on an ordinary flat surface. Losing that advantage was only justified if edge rails enabled heavier loads to be hauled by a horse; there seemed to be a lack of objective evidence on that point.

The track gauge was 4 ft 4 1/2 in. The Board of Trade Inspecting Officer visited on 25 September 1849, and his report mistakenly refers to a gauge of 4 ft 4 in. (Note: BoT Inspectors' reports often make approximations like this, possibly due to hastily scribbled note-taking on the day.)

== Financial trends ==
At the first proprietors' meeting in April 1820 it was announced that the cost of building the railway had been £35,000, "which had put the Company and its investors into debt". The amount collected by tolls was £1,350, and a dividend of 3% was declared.

Income figures are available for the year 1833-4: gross income was £1,966 3s 9d; expenses were £485 13s 2d and a dividend of 9% was paid. Coal and coke were by far the dominant commodity carried. (Note: By independent carriers, of course.) Repairing the rails proved more expensive than had been foreseen: the cost of repairs in the 1824/25 statement amounted to £204 18s. In 1834, it was decided that if any new rails were required they should be of wrought iron, not less than 12 feet long. Larger stone blocks were needed for the sleepers for these rails. They were to measure not less than 2 feet by 20 inches and 8 inches thick. The first order for the longer rails was for 200 yards. In 1836 one hundred and sixty rails were ordered.

Although the Mansfield & Pinxton Railway was originally envisaged as an extension of the Cromford Canal, the canal company took little interest in the railway, and repeatedly declined to give discounted rates. Most of the traffic in later years was coal from pits alongside the lower part of the line to the industrial and domestic hearths of Mansfield. The quantity of stone conveyed was less than expected, mainly because of the expense of carrying it forward by canal. Nevertheless, one of Britain's most famous landmarks, the Palace of Westminster (the Houses of Parliament) was rebuilt during the mid-1830s using limestone transported over the Pinxton line. Mansfield dispatched its renowned moulding sand to local ironworks via the railway and received wagons of metal for its foundries. Bricks, lime, timber, slate and assorted agricultural produce made up the remaining traffic. Nevertheless coal outweighed the traffic volumes seven to one.

== Passenger operation ==
William Epperstone (proprietor of the Boat Inn at Pinxton Wharf) provided a passenger service from 1832; his vehicle left "Wheatcroft & Co's. Railway Waggon Warehouse, Portland Wharf" every Thursday at 3 pm, in addition to "two or three waggons, every morning, at 6 or 7 o'clock, on the Railway to Pinxton, whence goods are forwarded to all parts of the Kingdom by land and water."

== Takeover ==
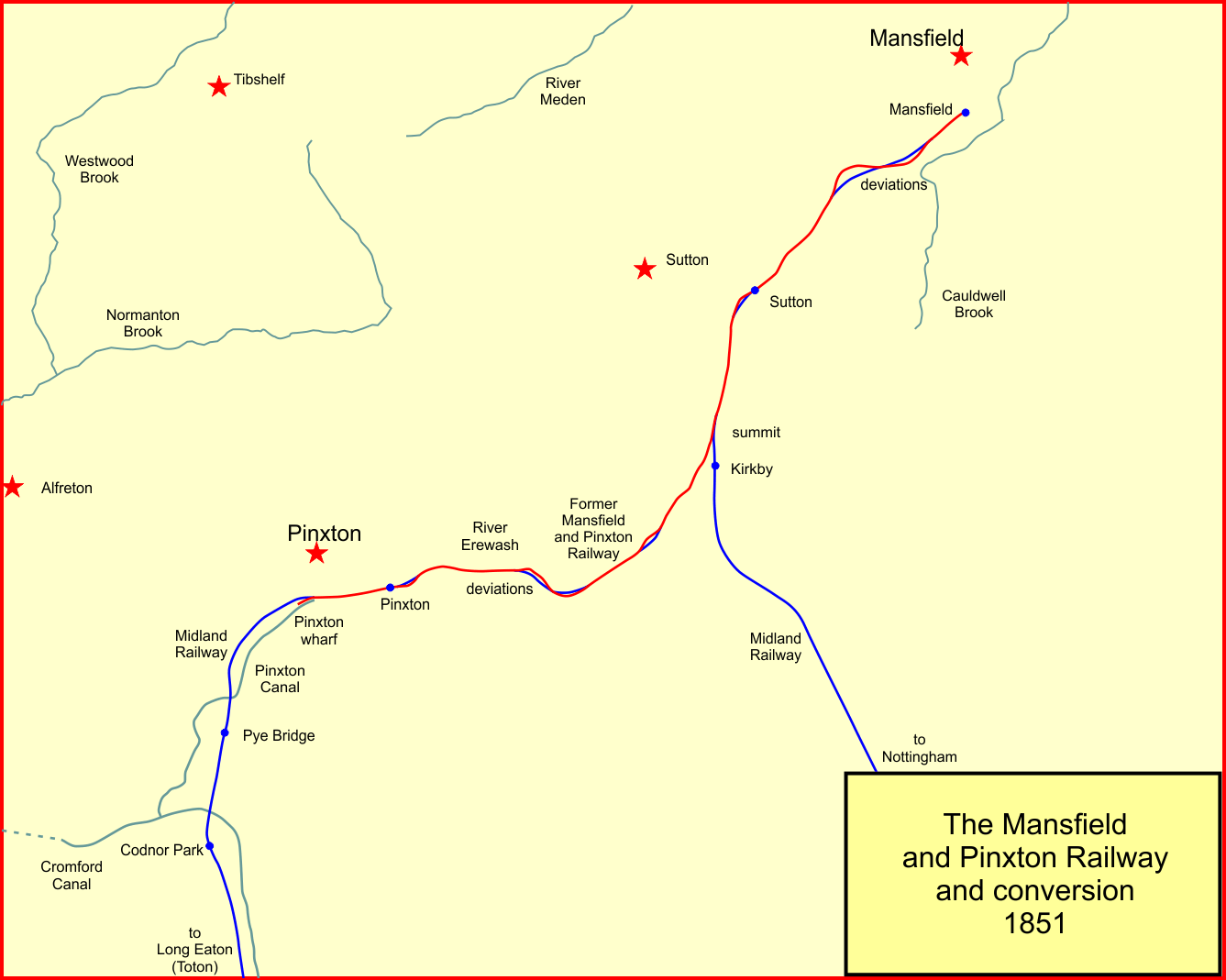
The Mansfield and Pinxton Railway in 1851

The Midland Railway was formed in May 1844; it acquired the rights to the Erewash Valley Railway; it opened that line from Long Eaton Junction to Codnor Park on 6 September 1847. The Midland Railway saw the importance of connecting to Mansfield, but two new companies were being promoted: the Boston, Newark & Sheffield Railway was to pass through Southwell and Mansfield, while the Nottingham, Mansfield & Midlands Junction Railway would incorporate the Mansfield & Pinxton line. These two organisations were so confident about their prospects that they jointly purchased the Mansfield & Pinxton company the following year. The Midland Railway had decided to build a line from Nottingham to Mansfield, using part of the Pinxton Railway, and Parliament favoured their plans, and an act of Parliament for the Nottingham to Mansfield railway (initially connecting with the Mansfield & Pinxton north of Kirkby in Ashfield) was passed as the Midland Railway (Nottingham and Mansfield) Act 1846 (9 & 10 Vict. c. clxiii) on 16 July 1846.

Midland Railway (Mansfield and Pinxton Branch) Act 1847
- Act of Parliament
- Parliament of the United Kingdom
- Long title: An Act to enable the Midland Railway Company to purchase the Mansfield and Pinxton Railway, and to alter the same, and to make a Railway from the Erewash Valley Railway to the Nottingham and Mansfield Railway, with Branches to Mansfield, and also to the Alfreton Ironworks.
- Citation: 10 & 11 Vict. c. cxci

Dates
- Royal assent: 9 July 1847

Text of statute as originally enacted

The Midland Railway got the Midland Railway (Mansfield and Pinxton Branch) Act 1847 (10 & 11 Vict. c. cxci) on 9 July 1847. This sanctioned the acquisition of the tramway and its incorporation in a line between Codnor Park and Mansfield. Ownership of the Pinxton line remained a problem. The issue was finally resolved on 15 February 1848, when the Railway Commissioners issued a certificate, by the authority of which the Mansfield & Pinxton Railway was amalgamated with the Midland and immediately dissolved. The purchase of the Mansfield and Pinxton Tramway cost £21,066 13s. 4d.; Stretton considered that a comparatively small sum.

== Conversion and reopening ==
This gave the Midland Railway two routes to Mansfield: a new line from near Nottingham, via the Leen Valley, and the Erewash Valley line via Codnor Park. The tramway style of track of the Mansfield and Pinxton Railway needed to be completely renewed. It had been built with no concern for speed, and several sharp curves needed to be eased. The work progressed rapidly, and on 24 August 1849 a contractor's locomotive visited Mansfield, attracting considerable local attention. Midland Railway directors arrived by special train on 17 September, and the Board of Trade inspection took place on 25 September. The route between Kirkby and Mansfield section was found to be in good shape. but the Codnor Park line was missing several crossing gates and even some short lengths of track.

Mineral workings over the Codnor Park line (not requiring Board of Trade approval), and passenger services from Mansfield to Nottingham, commenced on 9 October 1849. There were four passenger journeys a day, taking 55 minutes. Mansfield trains from Nottingham followed the River Leen through Radford and Hucknall. Then there was an arduous four mile climb at 1 in 79 past Linby and Newstead to Kirkby Tunnel, 199 yards. The line continued to Kirkby, and a short distance north of there, the new line joined the route of the Pinxton railway past Sutton-in-Ashfield and across King's Mill viaduct to Mansfield. The distance from Nottingham to Mansfield was about 17 miles. There was a new terminal at Mansfield, attached to the original Mansfield and Pinxton warehouse. The Codnor Park-Mansfield railway climbed gently up the Erewash Valley to join the old tramway formation east of Pinxton basin.

== Extended colliery working ==
The Mansfield line became the springboard for reaching areas north and east of the town, promoted by the expansion of coal working in those areas. Mansfield station was converted for through working in 1872, although actual through operation did not begin until 1875. Numerous other collieries directly on the former Mansfield and Pinxton line opened towards the end of the nineteenth century, as technological improvements enabled the exploitation of the deeper seams. Many branch lines connections to the M&PR route were made, and competing lines were opened too.

== The twentieth century ==
Expansion of colliery activity continued in the twentieth century. The Midland Railway became a constituent of the new London, Midland and Scottish Railway in 1923, under the "grouping" of the railways, directed by the Railways Act 1921. In turn the LMS, with other companies, was nationalised in 1948, becoming part of British Railways.

By this time local passenger traffic (and the ordinary goods business) had been hard hit by road competition. Ordinary passenger services from Mansfield to Codnor Park and Pye Bridge had been withdrawn on 10 September 1951, although a workmen's service from Kirkby to Nottingham continued until 6 September 1965. On 12 October 1964 the Leen Valley passenger trains between Nottingham and Mansfield were withdrawn. In June 1975 all goods facilities at Mansfield were withdrawn, so that the local rail network was entirely dependent on coal traffic. The Midland Railway Leen Valley route had already been severed between Kirkby in Ashfield and Annesley on 11 October 1970.

== Passenger trains reinstated ==
A body of opinion developed in favour of funding reinstatement of the Leen Valley services to Mansfield, and the British Railways Act 1990 (c. xxv) authorising the Newstead - Kirkby link was passed on 26 July 1990; the term 'Robin Hood Line' was adopted. A Nottingham - Newstead passenger service began on 17 May 1993. In 1994 work started on reinstating the link at Kirkby tunnel, and passenger services from Nottingham to Mansfield Woodhouse started operation on 20 November 1995; the service was later extended to Worksop.

The trains ran over the alignment of the Mansfield and Pinxton Railway as modified by the Midland Railway, between Kirkby and Mansfield. The line from Codnor Park is in use for mineral traffic, and uses the M&PR route from Pinxton.

== Bi-centennial celebration ==
In 2019, the town of Mansfield celebrated 200 years since the opening of the railway with a procession into the town centre involving 90 participants, with some in period costume. The celebrations were partially supported by a Heritage Fund grant.
