= Joan Chaworth =

- Died: 29 August 1507
- Spouse: John Ormond
- Issue: Joan Ormond; Elizabeth Ormond; Anne Ormond
- Father: Sir William Chaworth
- Mother: Elizabeth Bowett

Joan Chaworth (died 29 August 1507) was the heiress of the manor of Alfreton. Her father was Sir William Chaworth.

== Life ==
Joan Chaworth was the daughter of Sir William Chaworth (d.1467) and Elizabeth Bowett, daughter and coheir of Nicholas Bowett of Rippingale, Lincolnshire. She was the granddaughter of Sir Thomas Chaworth (d.1459), who had four sons, Sir William Chaworth (d.1467), John Chaworth (d. 1464), Sir Thomas Chaworth (d. May 1465), and George Chaworth (d.1466).

In 1465 Joan's father, Sir William, was described as 'a sickly man', unable even to ride, and died within two years. Joan's only brother, Thomas Chaworth (1457–1483), married Margaret Talbot, daughter of John Talbot, 2nd Earl of Shrewsbury, and sister of John Talbot, 3rd Earl of Shrewsbury, but he suffered a mental illness and died without issue in 1483.

Sir Thomas Chaworth's three younger sons had all also died by that time, and only the fourth son, George, left surviving male issue. John Chaworth was murdered in 1464, leaving an only son, Thomas, who died without issue in December 1485; Sir Thomas Chaworth died without issue in May 1465; and George Chaworth died in 1466, leaving a young grandson, George Chaworth (d.1521), who inherited the manors of Wiverton and Edwalton, and was ancestor of George Chaworth (d.1639), created Viscount Chaworth of Armagh in 1628. With the death of Joan's brother Thomas in 1483, the male Chaworth line was thus all but extinguished, and Joan, as her brother's heir at law, inherited most of the extensive Chaworth estates.

By her marriage to John Ormond (d.1503), Joan had three daughters, among whom any barony of Chaworth which had been created by a writ in 1299 to her ancestor, Thomas de Chaworth (d.1315), is considered to have fallen into abeyance.

Joan died 29 August 1507. In the chancel of the parish church of Alfreton a memorial tablet inlaid with brass plates bears the engraved effigies of Joan and her husband, John Ormond. The arms of Chaworth of Alfreton were Barry of ten, argent and gules, three martlets sable.

Graves Park, Sheffield, part of the Norton estate, was included in the lands of the former manor of Alfreton.

== Marriage and issue ==
Joan Chaworth married, in 1458, John Ormond (d. 5 October 1503), esquire. John Ormond and his two brothers, Sir James Ormond (d. 17 July 1497) and Edward Ormond, were illegitimate sons of John Butler, 6th Earl of Ormond (d. 14 October 1476), by his mistress Reynalda O'Brien, daughter of Turlogh "The Brown" O'Brien, King of Thomond. By John Ormond, Joan had three daughters:

- Joan Ormond, who married firstly Thomas Dynham, illegitimate son of 'John, the last Lord Dinan', by whom she had several children, and secondly a husband surnamed FitzWilliam.
- Elizabeth Ormond, who married Anthony Babington, by whom she was the great-grandmother of Anthony Babington, executed for treason during the reign of Elizabeth I.
- Anne Ormond, who married William Mering of Nottinghamshire, but died without issue.
