= River Leen =

River in Nottinghamshire, England

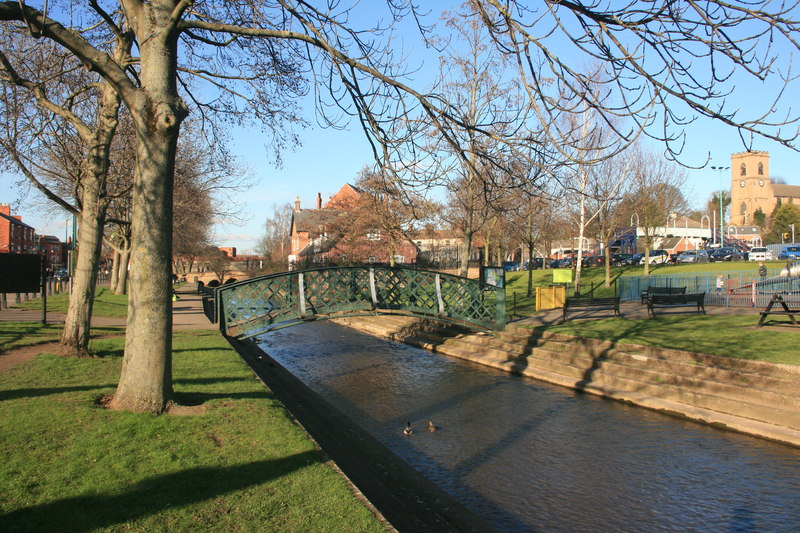
- River Leen near Bulwell

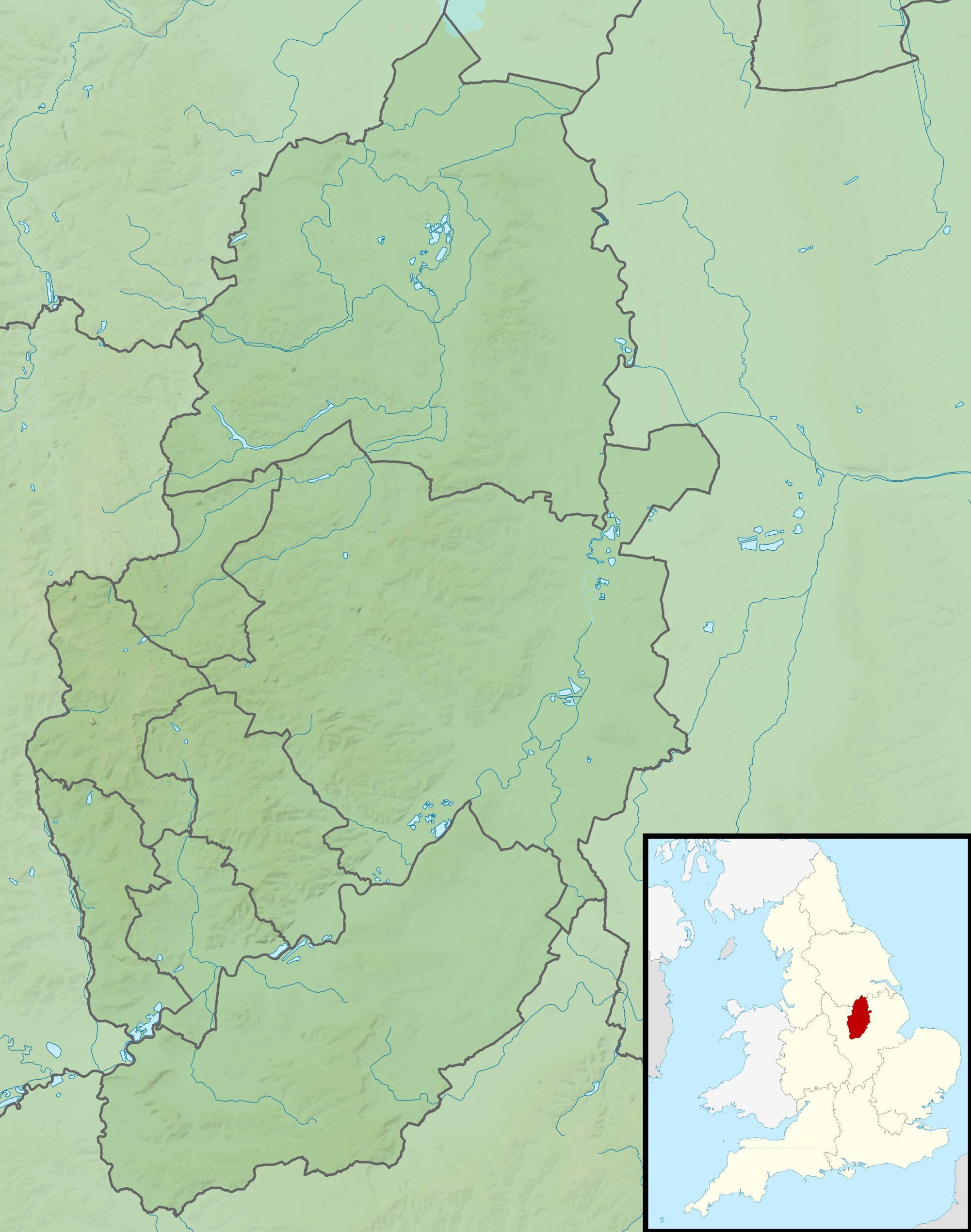
- Confluence with the River Trent shown in Nottinghamshire

Location
- Country: United Kingdom
- Country within the UK: England
- Counties: Nottinghamshire
- Towns: Bulwell, Basford, Radford, Lenton
- City: Nottingham

Physical characteristics
- Source
  - location: Robin Hood Hills, Annesley, Nottinghamshire
  - coordinates: 53.0861°N 1.2187°W
- Mouth
  - location: Confluence with the River Trent, The Meadows, Nottingham
  - coordinates: 52.9371°N 1.1585°W
- Length: 24 km (15 mi)
- Basin size: 124 km^{2} (48 sq mi)
- Discharge
  - location: Triumph Road, Lenton
  - average: 0.67 m^{3}/s (24 cu ft/s)

Basin features
- Tributaries
  - left: Whyburn, Farleys Brook
  - right: Day Brook

The River Leen is a 15-mile (24 km) long tributary of the River Trent that flows through Nottinghamshire, and the city of Nottingham in the East Midlands of England.

The name Leen developed through various renderings of the Celtic word meaning "lake" or "pool" (Llyn in modern Welsh). Some of the surrounding villages derived their name from the River Leen. Lenton, ton being the Saxon word for "village"; and Linby, by being the Danish equivalent of ton.

== Course ==
The Leen rises as a series of springs at the foot of the Robin Hood Hills just outside Annesley. It then flows through the grounds and lakes of Newstead Abbey, passing Papplewick and meeting the Whyburn as it passes through Bestwood Country Park, following the route of the Leen Valley into suburban and urban Nottingham. Within the city it flows through the centre of Bulwell, and passes Basford where it is joined by the Day Brook. The Leen then flows through Radford, and Lenton before passing under the Nottingham Canal and flowing on to join the River Trent next to Riverside Way in The Meadows.

== History ==
From Lenton onwards the course of the Leen has been quite radically altered on a number of occasions, although the river's present course probably follows a route close to its original natural course. The first change to the river's course came in the late eleventh or early twelfth centuries, when the river was diverted to pass beneath the cliff on which Nottingham Castle was situated before flowing into the Trent near Trent Bridge, thus providing the town of Nottingham with a more plentiful supply of water. The next change came with the opening of the Nottingham Canal, which in some places occupied the course of the Leen, with the river being diverted along the route of the present Canal Street. This stretch was eventually culverted in 1863 by the Nottingham Borough Engineer, Marriott Ogle Tarbotton.

Further changes came with the construction of Castle Boulevard along the foot of the Castle cliff in 1884. With insufficient room for river, canal and road, the river was diverted into the canal at Lenton and the road built on the course of the former river. After flowing some distance along the canal, the river passed over a small weir into the Tinker’s Leen (where the modern Courts complex is now situated) and so into the Trent just downstream of Trent Bridge. However over time, and as the river's catchment area became more built up with faster run-off times, flooding became a problem, with particularly heavy flooding in 1960. By this stage, the main line of the canal between Lenton and Langley Mill had been abandoned, although the stretch through Nottingham remains in use as part of the Trent navigation.

This flooding led to a further diversion, which would largely divert the river back to its original pre-eleventh-century course. The river was first diverted into the southernmost section of the abandoned canal, between Derby Road and the operational canal at Lenton. It was then taken under that canal in a syphon, before entering a brand new channel that took it to join the Trent at its nearest point.

== Mythology ==
The River Leen, as alluded to by the location of its source, is frequently mentioned in the Robin Hood mythology, often cited as the river upon which Robin Hood and Little John fought their famous duel.

In 2011, several non-native turtle sightings were seen in the River Leen over a one week period. Currently there is no known explanation for this.

== Recent developments ==
Nottingham City Council planning guidance and best practice from the Environment Agency is now to remove culverts, which are expensive to maintain and can cause flooding when they are blocked or damaged. As a result, a number of developments along the course of the Leen now open up previously culverted stretches of the waterway.

A new Tesco Extra development in Bulwell town centre, which received planning permission in 2008, removed a culvert running under Kwiksave and Food Giant. A channel was constructed to direct the river under Jennison Street and along the east-southeast border of the Tesco's car park.

In Radford, a new student village at Chettle's Yard will open up a long stretch of the river parallel to the railway line.

And the eastern part of the University of Nottingham's Jubilee Campus opens up a section of the river's urban route through Lenton, a small lake having been created to the rear of the Ingenuity Centre, adjacent to the concrete channel (through which the Leen still flows) that was originally built to prevent the flooding of the now-demolished Raleigh cycle factory. The river then passes through several industrial units and under Triumph Road, before re-appearing behind the Nottingham Emergency Medical Services centre (the old AA building) on Derby Road. The Leen is sometimes mistakenly believed to pass through the main part of the Jubilee Campus, but the lake and other water features in that area are artificial in nature.

== Bibliography ==
- Trent Water Authority – Official Handbook (1973)
