= Whyburn =

Stream in Nottinghamshire, England

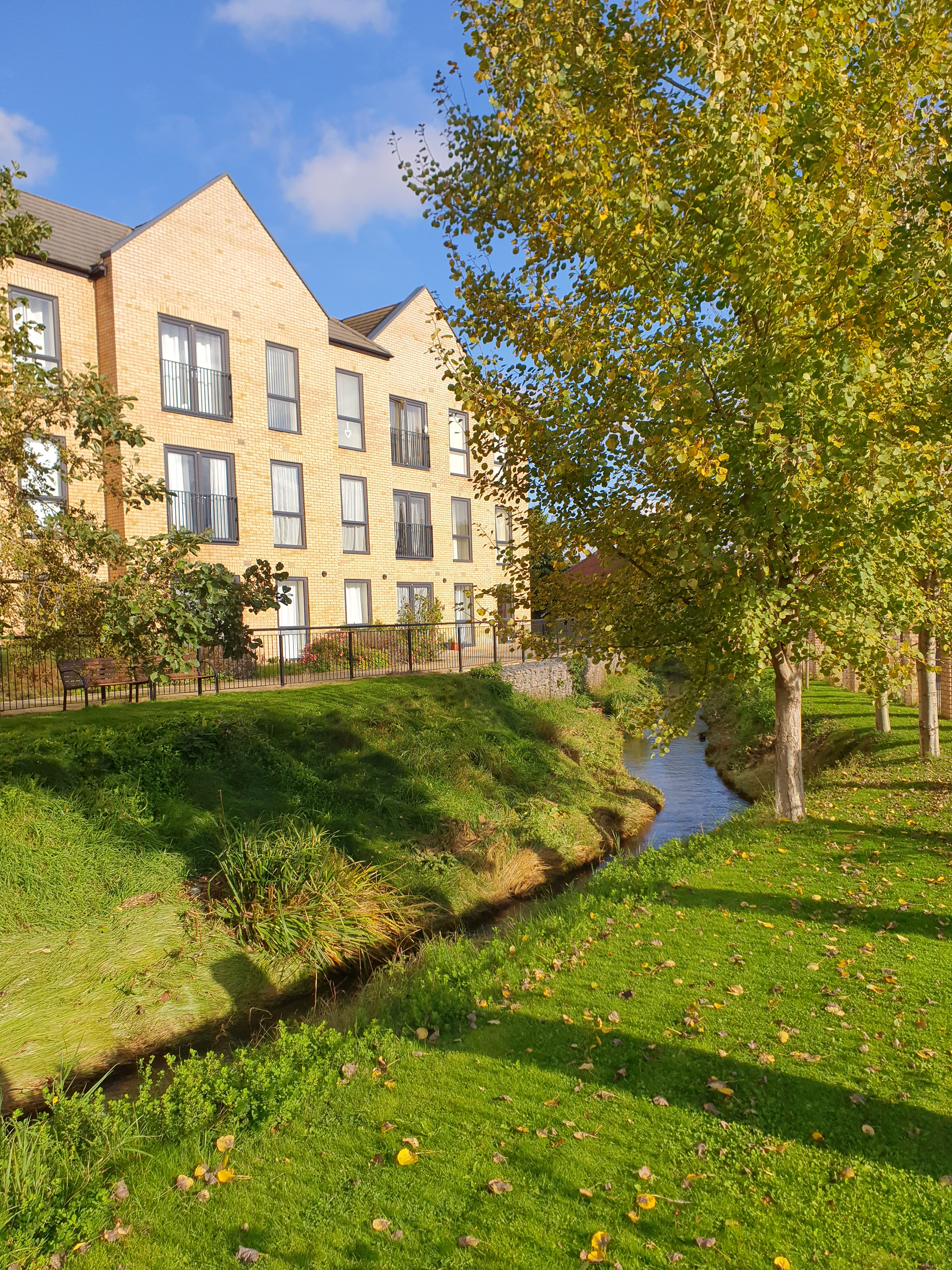
- Whyburn by Spring Street

Location
- Country: England
- County: Nottinghamshire
- Town: Hucknall

Physical characteristics
- Source
  - location: Hucknall
- Mouth: River Leen
  - location: Bestwood Village
  - coordinates: 53°1′47″N 1°10′56″W
- Length: 5.01 km (3.11 mi)
- Basin size: 8.25 km^{2} (3.19 mi^{2})

The Whyburn (known locally as Town Brook, and by the UK Government as Baker Lane Brook) is the main watercourse flowing through the town of Hucknall in the English county of Nottinghamshire. It rises in two separate springs at the foot of the Misk Hills by Whyburn Farm, and flows east into the town of Hucknall, past Whyburn Lane to which it also gives its name. The brook once drove several mills in Hucknall, the most notable example being close to the junction of Baker Street and Annesley Road near the town centre. In the History of Hucknall Torkard it is suggested that a mill pond once existed close to the former village green (now the Market Place).

The name of the stream is thought to be derived from a Celtic word 'Wy' meaning 'water'. The Whyburn has a total length of around 5.01 kilometres (3.11 mi), and terminates in a confluence with the River Leen immediately upstream of Bestwood Village Mill Lakes. A school used to take the name of 'Whyburn'.

== Flood mitigation measures ==
The path of the Whyburn takes it though urban built up areas of Hucknall. In order to reduce the risk of urban flooding, several flood mitigation measures have been implemented along its length, including retention ponds, flood barriers, a monitoring station, and flood warning services.

In spite of the measures, the brook has flooded several times. The highest recorded river level was measured at 1.47 metres (4 ft 10 in) during Storm Babet in October 2023.

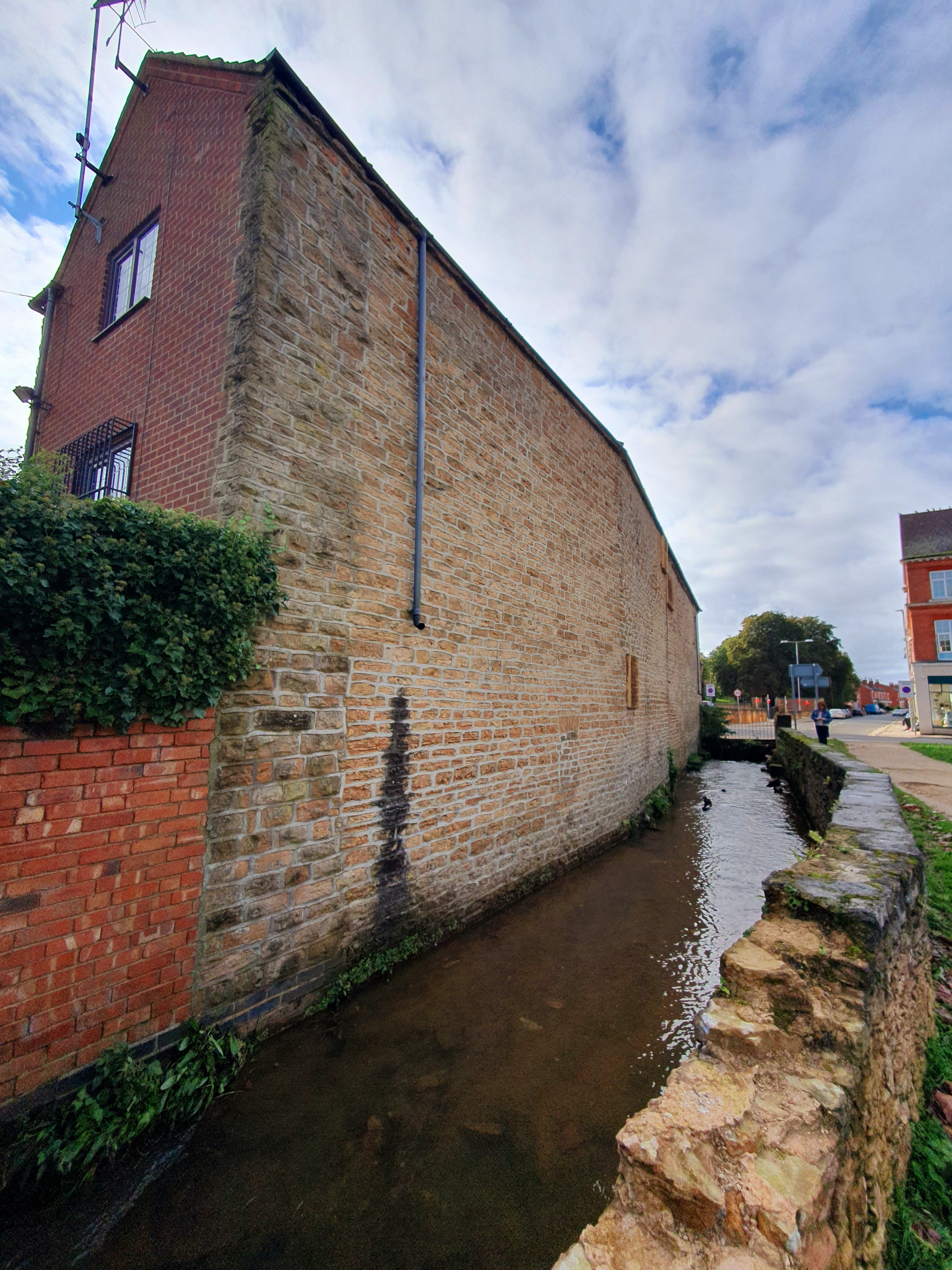
Disused mill by Bakers Street

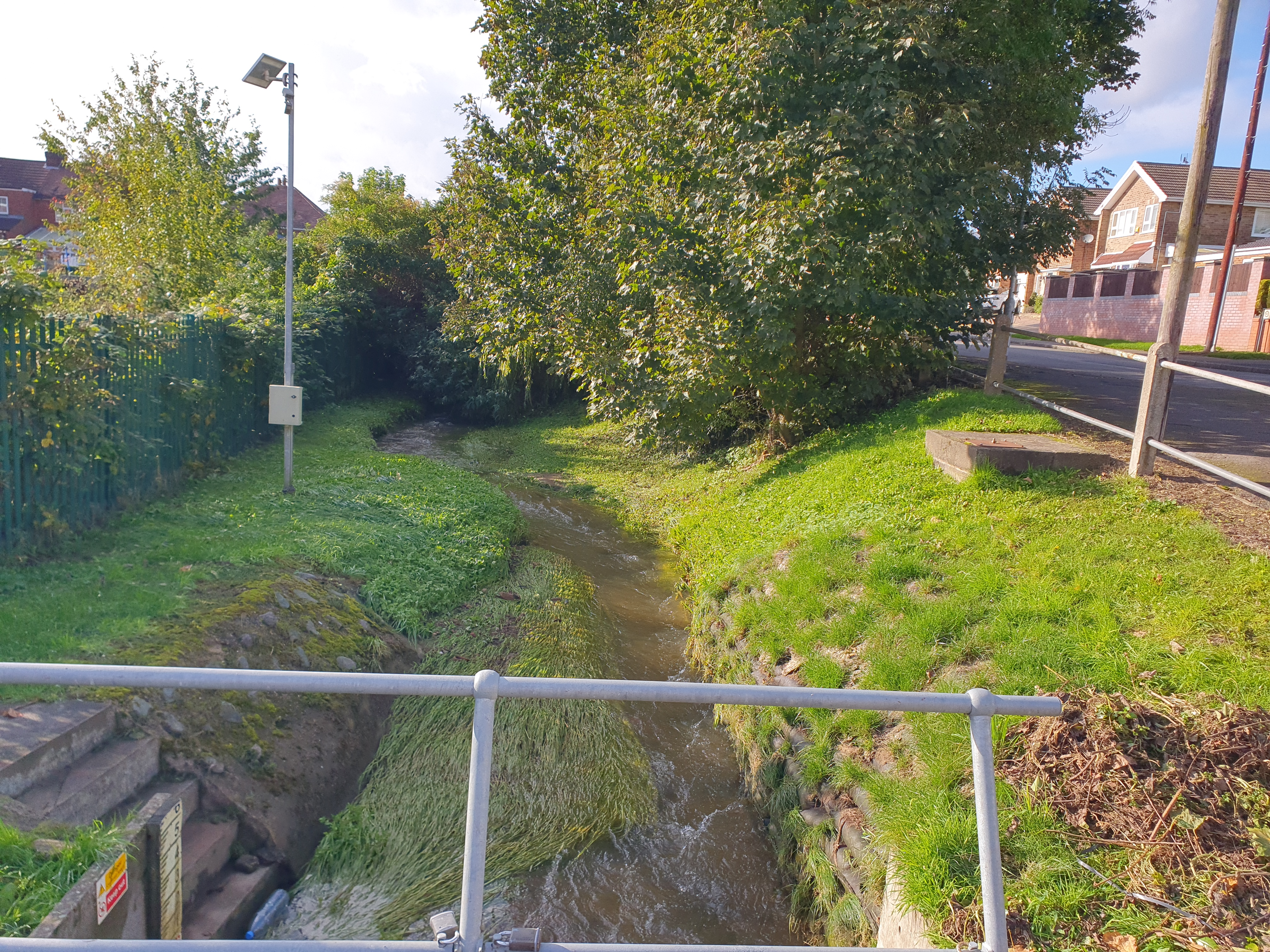
River monitoring station on Spring Street

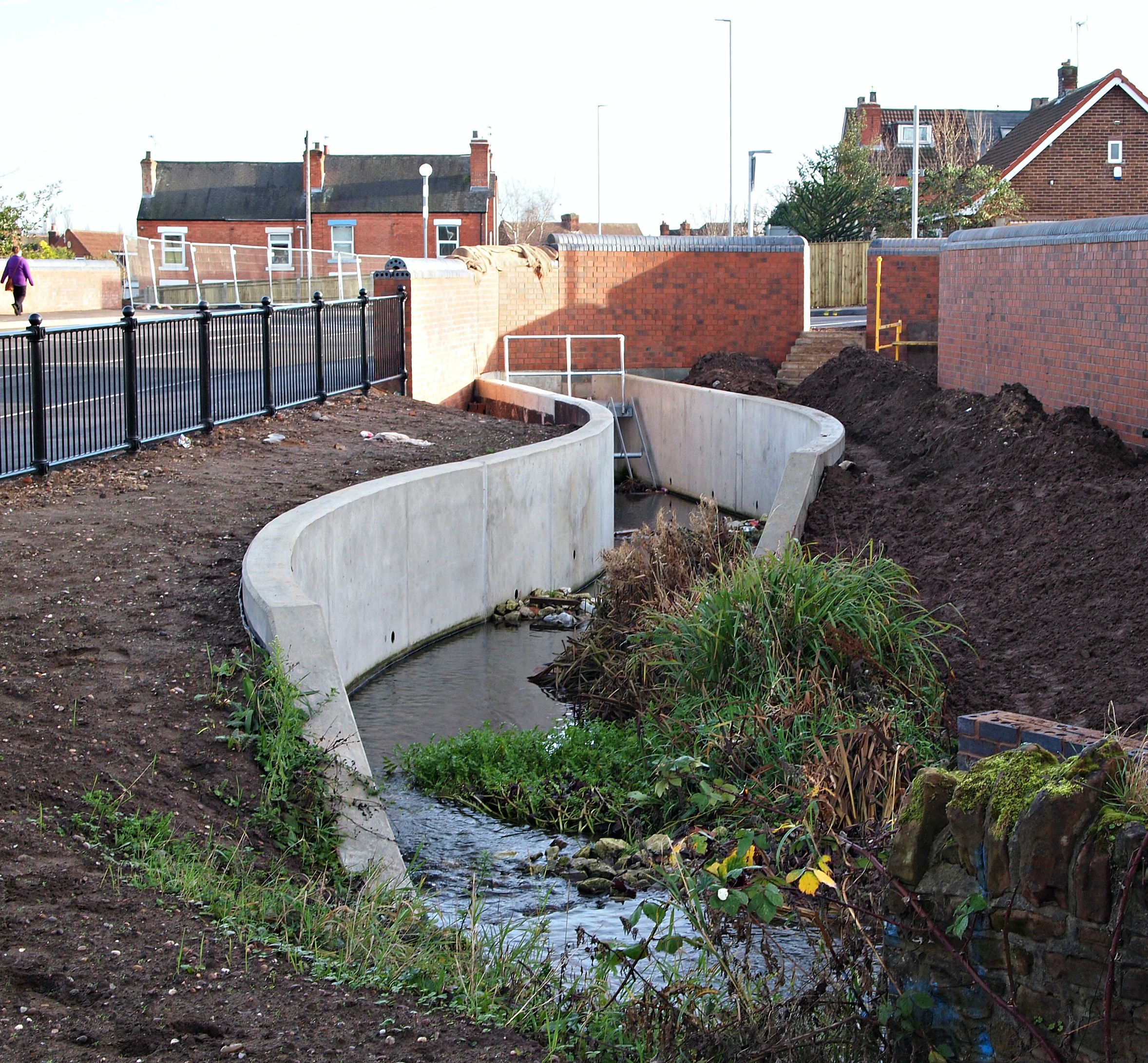
Curved feature beside Torkard Way

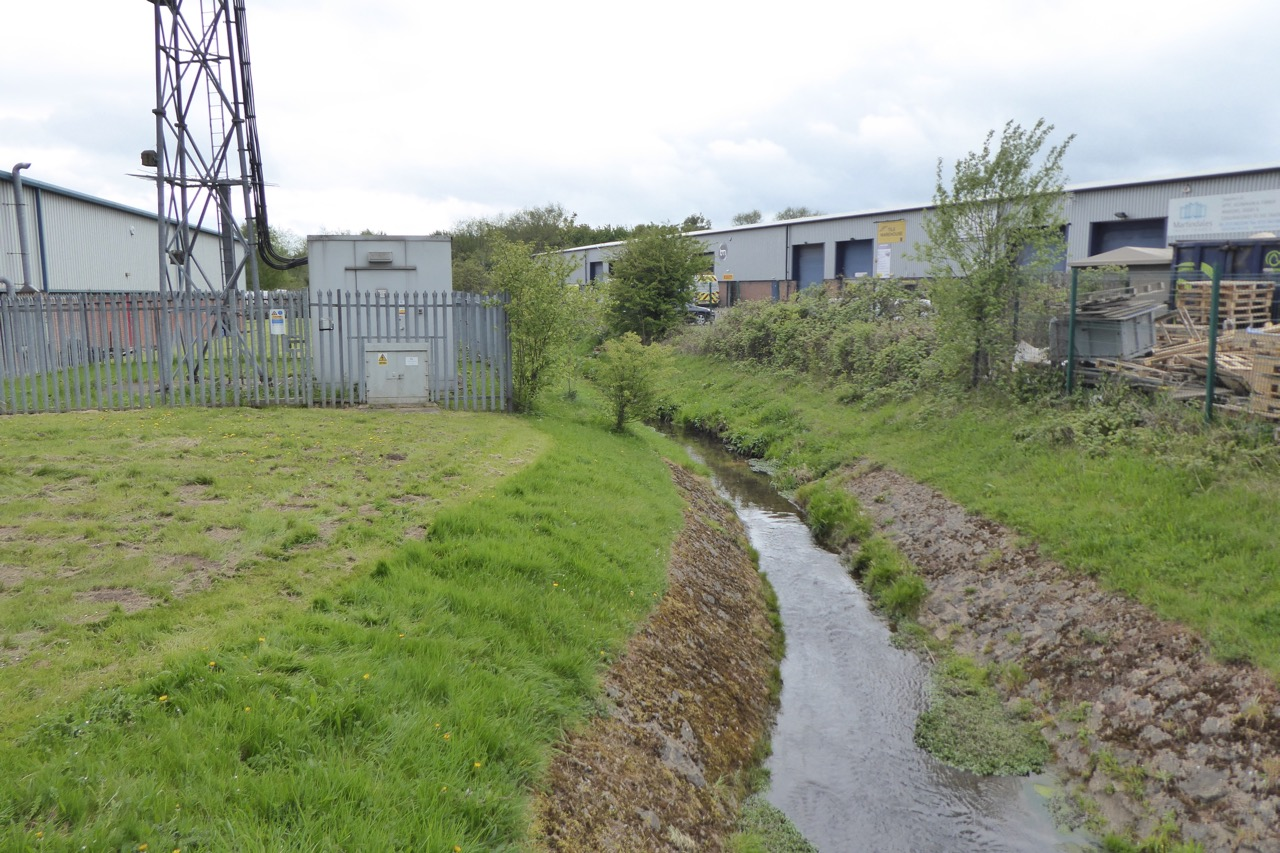
Passing by Wigwam Lane business park

== See also ==
- Farleys Brook
