= Bridget Chaworth =

- Born: c. 1542
- Died: 18 April 1621 (aged 78–79)
- Buried: Ufford, Northamptonshire
- Spouse: Sir William Carr
- Father: Sir John Chaworth
- Mother: Mary Paston

Bridget Chaworth (c. 1542 – 18 April 1621), later Bridget Carr, was a gentlewoman of the Privy Chamber to Elizabeth I and Queen Anne.

== Family ==
Bridget Chaworth, born about 1542, was the daughter of Sir John Chaworth (c. 1498 – 3 September 1558) of Wiverton Hall, Nottinghamshire, and Mary Paston (c. 1520 – 30 September 1583), the daughter of Sir William Paston (d.1554) of Oxnead, by Bridget, daughter of Sir Henry Heydon. She was the granddaughter of George Chaworth (d.1521), who inherited the manors of Wiverton and Edwalton, the latter manor having been held by the Chaworth family since early in the thirteenth century.

== Career ==
She entered the service of Elizabeth I as a gentlewoman of the Privy Chamber about 1578, and continued to serve the Queen for the remaining twenty-five years of her reign. She received gifts of clothes from the Queen. Bridget also helped to make the Queen's clothes, and in March 1580 embroidered a caul of network with trueloves of pearls. The Queen gave her a 'scarf of ash colour cypress with 2 edges of gold & silver', which she later bestowed on George Tenecre.

About 1590 she married Sir William Carr, but remained in the Queen's service. She attended the Queen in her final illness; in a letter written on 15 March 1603, a week before the Queen's death, George Chaworth wrote to Lady Arbella Stuart that:

I went to my cousin Carr. She was with the Queen, for she is sick, though courtiers say contrary.

After Queen Elizabeth's death, Lady Bridget continued to serve in the royal household as a gentlewoman to Queen Anne, wife of James I, for the remaining fourteen years of her own life.

She died 18 April 1621 at the age of seventy-nine, and was buried in the parish church at Ufford, Northamptonshire, where the inscription on her monument commemorates her service to Elizabeth I and Queen Anne, as well as her love for her sister, Katherine Chaworth, wife of George Quarles of Ufford:

Dame Bridget, Lady Carr, widow, daughter of Sir John Chaworth of Wiverton, Nottingham, late wife to Sir William Carr of Old Sleaford in the county of Lincoln, who served the late Queen Elizabeth of most famous memory, being one of the gentlewomen of her Majesty’s Privy Chamber for the space of five and twenty years, and afterwards served the most renowned Queen Anne, wife to our most gracious sovereign, King James, for the space of 14 years, being the residue of her life, and died the 18th day of April being of the age of 79 years, the which said Lady Carr, out of her love to her dear sister Katherine, the wife of George Quarles of this town of Ufford, esquire, hath caused her body to be here interred 1612 [sic].

== Marriage ==
In around 1590 she married Sir William Carr (16 May 1542 – 1608) of Sleaford, Lincolnshire, by whom she had no issue. Sir William Carr was succeeded by his youngest brother, Edward Carr, 1st Baronet Carr.

Edward Carr died in 1618. His will mentions items of silver gilt plate which may have been gifts from Elizabeth I to William and Bridget Carr. Inventories of Elizabeth's silver mention that Bridget Carr was responsible for some of the silver used in her privy chamber.
