= Patrick Chaworth, 3rd Viscount Chaworth =

English peer (1635-1693)

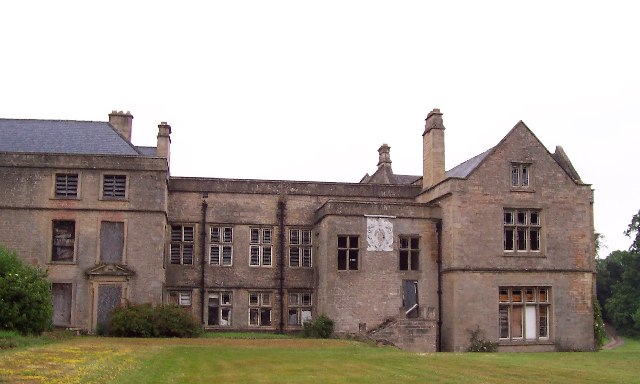
Annesley Hall

Patrick Chaworth (20 June 1635 – June 1693) was 3rd Viscount Chaworth of Armagh. He is also known as Patricius Chaworth.

He was baptised on 20 June 1635 at Southwell, Nottinghamshire, England. He was the son of John Chaworth, 2nd Viscount Chaworth of Armagh and Hon. Elizabeth Noel. He married Lady Grace Manners, daughter of John Manners, 8th Earl of Rutland and Hon. Frances Montagu, before 1658. They had a daughter:

- Hon. Juliana Chaworth (1655–1692) married Chambre Brabazon, 5th Earl of Meath.

During the English Civil War, the family home Wiverton Hall was made uninhabitable by Parliamentary forces. Annesley Park became the new family seat. The marriage was not a happy one and eventually Grace left her husband to live in London. Patrick rebuilt parts of Annesley Hall, constructed the terrace and the flight of steps to the church. His Achievement of Arms was placed on one of the tower walls in the church. This was moved in 1874 to the new church, All Saints' Church, Annesley although it had been badly damaged by vandals.

He succeeded to the titles of 3rd Viscount Chaworth of Armagh and 3rd Baron Chaworth of Tryme on the death of his father in June 1644. He died in June 1693. He was buried at Annesley, Nottinghamshire. His will dated 30 April 1693 received probate on 24 April 1694 at York. Without male issue, on his death his titles became extinct.

Peerage of Ireland
Preceded by John Chaworth	Viscount Chaworth; 1644–1693	Extinct
