= Misk Hills =

Sandstone plateau in the East Midlands of England

Coordinates: 53.06°N 1.21°W

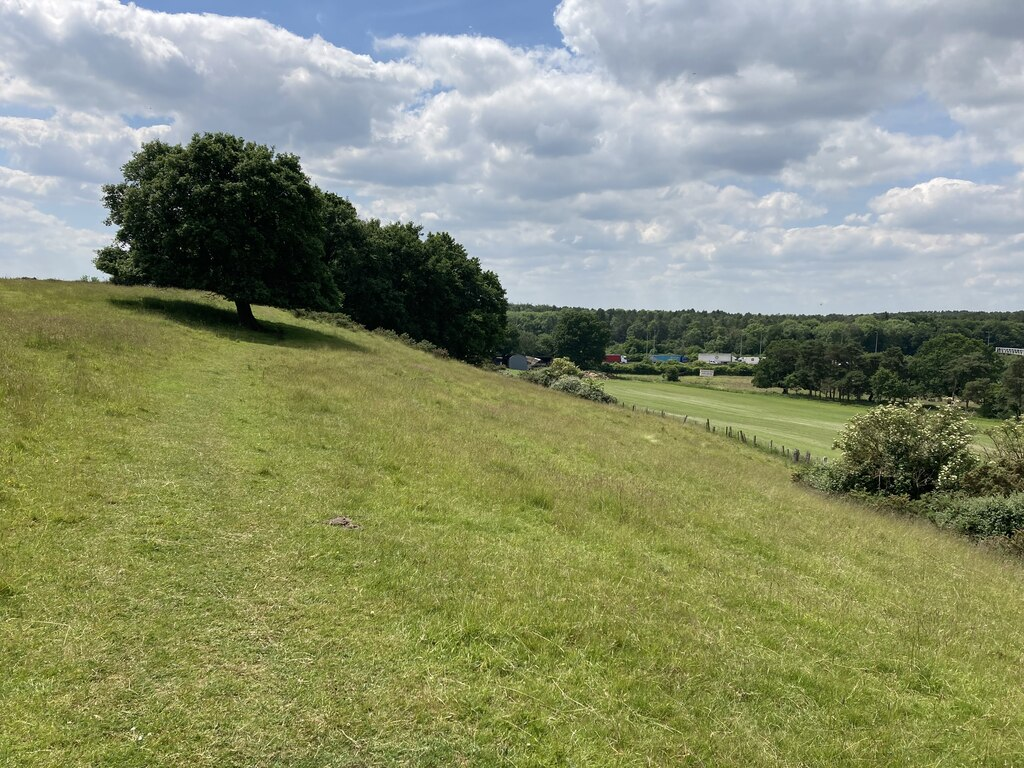
Misk Hills

The Misk Hills consist of a gently undulating sandstone plateau between Hucknall and Annesley in the county of Nottinghamshire in the north East Midlands of England. They offer views Southwards across the town of Hucknall, and the City of Nottingham. They are locally considered to be the first hills in the Pennine Chain, and rise to a high point of 170 metres above sea level from the flat plains to the east. The hills are the source of three minor watercourses, the Gilt Brook, the Whyburn (Hucknall's 'Town brook') and Farleys Brook. They separate the Leen Valley from the Erewash Valley.

== Literary links ==
The view over Hucknall from the easternmost height in the range, Diadem Hill, provided the setting for The Dream, a poem by Lord Byron, the Romantic English poet who lived locally in Newstead Abbey.

I saw two beings in the hues of youth
Standing upon a hill, a gentle hill,
Green and of mild declivity, the last
As 'twere the cape of a long ridge of such,
Save that there was no sea to lave its base,
But a most living landscape, and the wave
Of woods and corn-fields, and the abodes of men
Scattered at intervals, and wreathing smoke
Arising from such rustic roofs: the hill
Was crowned with a peculiar diadem
Of trees, in circular array, so fixed,
Not by the sport of nature, but of man

The Misk Hills were also the subject of Byron's poem 'The Hills of Annesley'

Hills of Annesley, bleak and barren,
Where my thoughtless childhood strayed,
How the northern tempests, warring,
How about thy tufted shade!
Now no more, the hours beguiling
Former favourite haunts I see,
Now no more, my Mary smiling,
Makes ye seem a heaven to me.

The Misk Hills were also mentioned by local author D. H. Lawrence, in his autobiographical novel Sons and Lovers, and Nottingham-born writer Alan Sillitoe wrote a poem entitled View from Misk Hill.

== Origins of the name ==
The etymology of the name Misk is unknown. Speculations are that the name relates to an Old English word for the moon, misor, or from the Anglo-Saxon word miersc meaning 'boundary'. The Misks lie close to the boundary between the territory of the Pecsaetan Anglian tribe and that of the kingdom of Mercia. This word also has etymological links with the Kingdom of Mercia. A range of sand hills in Stevenston, Ayrshire, Scotland, also share the name of Misk.

== Land use ==
The Misk Hills are used for a mixture of dairy and arable farming as well as commercial forestry, and are a popular place for walking, horse riding and cycling. Skylarks, fallow deer and hares inhabit the area. The area is intersected by the M1 motorway close to junction 27. The hills are central to Ashfield and Gedling District Council's 'Hidden Valleys' area, designed to promote tourism in the former coal mining district of Nottinghamshire. Annesley Castle, a motte and bailey fortification, stands at the foot of Diadem Hill and can be seen from the A611 Annesley Bypass as it intersects the Misks.

A Victorian era refuse dump was located in the area, and fragments of blue and white pottery litter the hills.

During World War Two, a bomb shelter was built on top of the hills. Nearby Hucknall was targeted by bombers as it had an RAF base, a Rolls-Royce engineering facility and numerous coal mines.

A microlight landing strip once operated in the hills.

Stood on the summit facing East, The Nottingham City skyline is often visible.
