= Annesley Old Church =

Grade I listed ruined church in Nottinghamshire, England

Coordinates: 53.0661°N 1.25°W

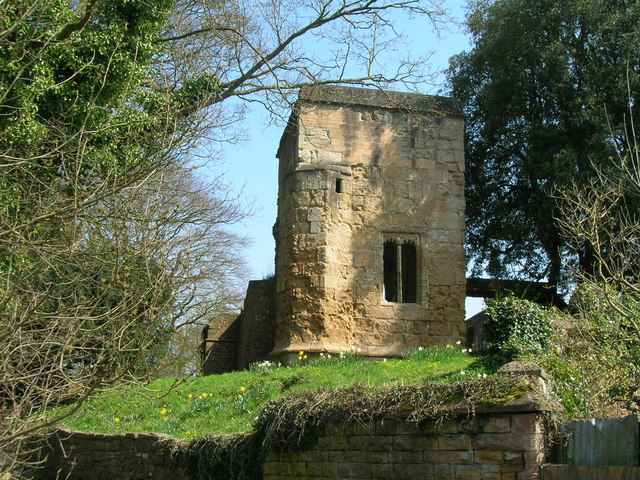
- A view of the church
- Annesley Old Church
- Location: Annesley, Nottinghamshire, NG15 0AS
- Website: discoverashfield.co.uk/places-to-visit/annesley-old-church

Administration
- Parish: Annesley

Annesley Old Church or the Church of All Saints, Annesley Park, is a disused church in a ruinous condition which stands on a mound near to Annesley Hall, Nottinghamshire, England. The building remains are Grade I listed and are surrounded by a graveyard. The site is scheduled as an Scheduled monument.

The church is built in stone and measures approximately 35 metres (115 ft) by 14.5 metres (48 ft). The standing remains include the roofless west tower, nave, chancel and a large 14th-century lady chapel to the south. The Lady Chapel, known as the "Felley Chantry" after the priory at Felley to whom the patronage once belonged, contained three fine sedilia and a piscina and a large east window with reticulated stone tracery. The surrounding graveyard contains a variety of mainly 17th- and 18th-century grave markers.

== History ==
The present building, constructed by the Annesley family in 1356, replaced a previous Norman building on the same site. After the Annesley estate had passed by marriage to the Chaworths, Patrick Chaworth, 3rd Viscount Chaworth, in 1686 built the flight of steps leading up to the church and arranged for a carving of his coat of arms, or Achievement, to be fixed one of the tower walls in the church. As the village of Annesley developed into a mining community it was decided to build a new church on a site nearer to the growing colliery community. The new church, All Saints' Church, Annesley, was consecrated in 1874. Occasional services, especially Harvest Festivals, continued to be held in the old church until 1942. Following the cessation of use the building deteriorated and Viscount Chaworth's achievement was transferred to the new church. When the Annesley estate was sold in 1973 the buildings fell into a state of total disrepair and were sold by the Church Commissioners to Ashfield District Council for a nominal £1. In 2012 Ashfield District Council completed a programme of preservation and restoration to make the site safe and accessible to visitors.

The ruined building was Grade I listed in 1966 and scheduled as an Ancient Monument in 1977. It is also on the Heritage at Risk register. In 2011 it was announced that the Heritage Lottery Fund would make an award of £450,000 to help Ashfield District Council to fund its conservation. The project was intended to conserve what remains of the church buildings and make the site more accessible for visitors. The Annesley Old Church Project was a three-year project that included phases that sought to restore the ruins and promote the use of the site for community events and activities.

The church is mentioned in the writings of both Lord Byron and D. H. Lawrence.
