= George Chaworth, 1st Viscount Chaworth =

English politician

George Chaworth, 1st Viscount Chaworth of Armagh (c. 1568 – 3 July 1639) was an English politician who sat in the House of Commons between 1621 and 1624 and was raised to the peerage as Baron Chaworth and Viscount Chaworth.

== Background and early life ==
Chaworth was the son of John Chaworth of Southwell, Nottinghamshire and his wife Jane Vincent. He matriculated at Trinity College, Oxford on 4 March 1586, aged 17 and was admitted to Gray's Inn in 1605. He was knighted at Greenwich on 29 May 1605 and was awarded MA at Oxford University on 30 August 1605.

== Career ==
Chaworth was Constable of Bristol Castle between 1 April 1616 and 1639. The National Archives contains a volume of copy letters, expense accounts and narrative record by him of his mission as privy councillor to Brussels as Ambassador Extraordinary to the Archduchess Infanta Isabel when her husband Albert VII, Archduke of Austria died in 1621. Chaworth was to attempt negotiations for Spain's withdrawal from the Rhine Palatinate, and subsequently to negotiate a treaty with Spain. His account includes observations on his travels in France and the Netherlands.

In 1621 Chaworth was elected Member of Parliament (M.P.) for Nottinghamshire. In 1624 he was elected MP for Arundel. He was created 1st Viscount Chaworth of Armagh, and 1st Baron Chaworth of Tryme on 4 March 1628. His main residence was Wiverton Hall in Nottinghamshire. He was High Sheriff of Nottinghamshire between November 1638 and 1639.

Chaworth died at the age of about 70 at Bath, Somerset and was buried on 15 July 1639 in St. Andrew's Church, Langar, Nottinghamshire.

== Family ==
Chaworth married Mary Knyveton, daughter of William Knyveton and Jane Leeche. They had a son John who succeeded to the titles.

Parliament of England
Preceded by Sir John Holles; Sir Gervase Clifton	Member of Parliament for Nottinghamshire; 1621–1622; With: Sir Gervase Clifton	Succeeded by Sir Gervase Clifton; Robert Sutton
Preceded by Sir Richard Weston; Sir Henry Spiller	Member of Parliament for Arundel; 1624; With: Sir Henry Spiller	Succeeded by Sir Henry Spiller; William Mills
Peerage of Ireland
New creation	Viscount Chaworth; 1628–1639	Succeeded by John Chaworth
