= Listed buildings in Wiverton Hall =

Wiverton Hall is a civil parish in the Rushcliffe district of Nottinghamshire, England. The parish contains two listed buildings that are recorded in the National Heritage List for England. Of these, one is listed at Grade II*, the middle of the three grades, and the other is at Grade II, the lowest grade. The main building in the parish is the country house of Wiverton Hall. This is listed, together with a group of associated buildings.

== Key ==
| Grade | Criteria |
|---|---|
| II* | Particularly important buildings of more than special interest |
| II | Buildings of national importance and special interest |

== Buildings ==
| Name and location | Photograph | Date | Notes | Grade |
|---|---|---|---|---|
| Wiverton Hall and service range 52.91985°N 0.94042°W | | 1815 | A small country house incorporating a 15th-century gatehouse, it is in Tudor Revival style. The house is in rendered brick, the gatehouse is in stone, and the house has an embattled parapet and a hipped roof. There are two storeys and five bays, the corners and the middle bay flanked by octagonal buttresses rising to turrets with embattled tops. In the centre is a porte-cochère with turrets, over which is an arched window with a hood mould. The windows are mullioned with Gothic glazing and hood moulds. The former gatehouse at the rear has round angle turrets, and string courses, and it contains an arched entrance with a moulded surround. The service range is L-shaped, with three bays, and it contains casement windows. | II* |
| Paddock Cottage and stable range, Wiverton Hall; 52.92029°N 0.94086°W | — | Early 19th century | The stable range and cottage are in brick with some stone, and have bracketed eaves and a blue slate roof. They form a U-shaped plan, and have a single storey, with an attic on the left wing. The main range has five bays, with a central arched doorway over which is a gable containing a clock, and a stone bellcote. The main range and the right wing contain arched doorways and cross casement windows. In the left wing is a three-light mullioned window and four gabled dormers. | II |
