= John Chaworth, 2nd Viscount Chaworth =

English peer (1605-1644)

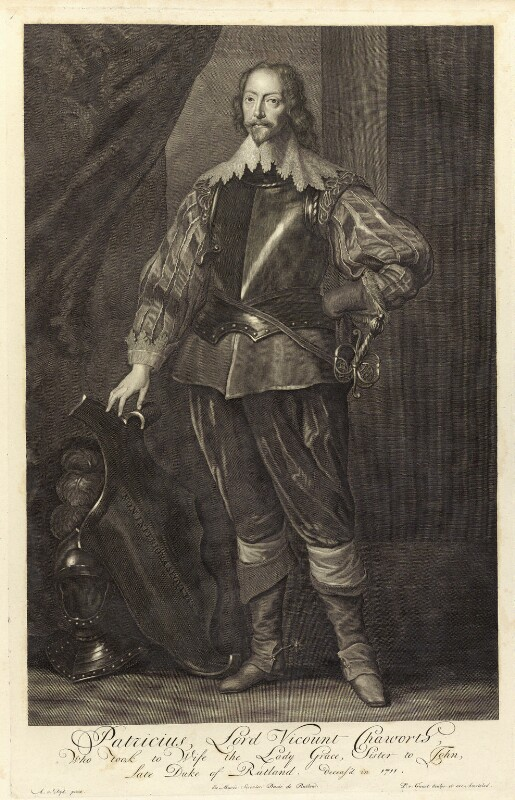
Chaworth

John Chaworth (1605 – June 1644) was 2nd Viscount Chaworth of Armagh.

He was the son of George Chaworth, 1st Viscount Chaworth of Armagh and Mary Knyveton. He married, firstly, Hon. Elizabeth Noel, daughter of Edward Noel, 2nd Viscount Campden and Hon. Juliana Hicks, on September 26, 1631. The children from this marriage were

- Mary Chaworth (died 1667)
- Hon. Elizabeth Chaworth (19 December 1632 – December 1683) married William Byron, 3rd Baron Byron
- Patrick Chaworth, 3rd Viscount Chaworth (20 June 1635 – June 1693)

After the death of his first wife, he married Anne Hickman, daughter of Dixie Hickman and Elizabeth Windsor, on 13 December 1643 at Gainsborough, Lincolnshire. He died in June 1644.

He succeeded to the titles of 2nd Viscount Chaworth of Armagh and 2nd Baron Chaworth of Tryme on 3 July 1639.

Lord Chaworth supported Charles I of England and in December 1642 fortified Wiverton Hall to make it a garrison for the King. In June 1643, Queen Henrietta, on her way from Newark, wrote to the King: ‘I shall sleep at Werton [Wiverton], and thence to Ashby, where we will resolve what way to take.’ Among other royal visitors were Prince Rupert of the Rhine and his brother Prince Maurice, who after visiting the King in Newark rode to Wiverton with about 400 troops and stayed there until they could settle their future plans. From Wiverton it was that Prince Rupert addressed a letter to the Parliament, asking for a pass for himself, his brother, and other noblemen and gentlemen to leave England.

Peerage of Ireland
Preceded by George Chaworth	Viscount Chaworth; 1639–1644	Succeeded by Patrick Chaworth
