= Caul (headgear) =

Headress to cover hair

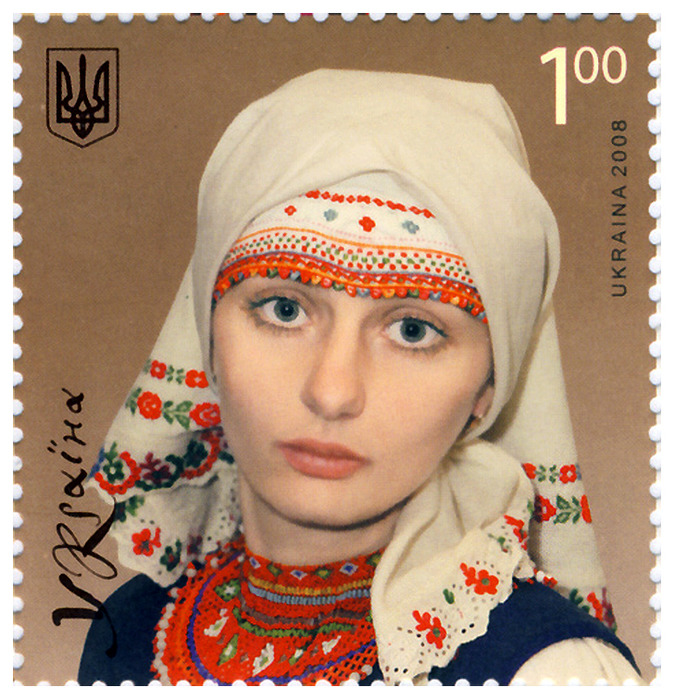
Ukrainian caul and kerchief

A caul is a historical headress worn by women that covers tied-up hair. A fancy caul could be made of satin, velvet, fine silk or brocade, although a simple caul would commonly be made of white linen or cotton. The caul could be covered by a crespine or a hairnet to secure it from falling off.

During the second half of the thirteenth century, network caps, more properly called "cauls", came into fashion for ladies' wear. These headdresses were shaped like bags, made of gold, silver or silk network. At first they fitted fairly close to the head, the edge, band or rim being placed high up on the forehead, to show some hair on the temples and around the nape; they enclosed the head and hair, and were secured by a circlet or fillet. Jewels were often set at intervals in the band, also at the intersections of the cross-bars.

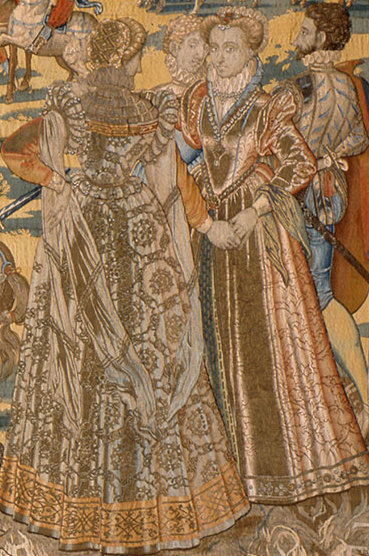
Detail of one of the Valois Tapestries, c. 1576; the woman on the left is wearing a caul

== Tudor cauls ==
At the coronation of Mary I in 1553, she came to Westminster Abbey wearing a gold circlet with a jewelled caul or "kall" made of tinsel fabric. Some chronicle accounts mention the weight of the circlet and caul, and that Mary had sometimes to support it with her hand. These comments may imply misogynistic criticism of this unprecedented female coronation.

A Scottish diplomat James Melville of Halhill wrote that in 1564 Elizabeth I's golden hair was best shown when she wore an Italian-style "kell" and bonnet. An inventory of the jewels of Elizabeth I includes a section of "attires" or head-dresses with "cawles" and "cawles of hair" set with pearls and rubies. These were intended to augment the queen's own hair.

Elizabeth's gentlewomen made some of her cauls. Dorothy Abington lined cauls with silk sarsenet fabric, and Bridget Chaworth embroidered a caul of black network with trueloves of pearls for Elizabeth in 1580. Cauls and other items were made for Elizabeth by the professionals Margaret Schetz alias Barney and the silkman Roger Montague. He made "fine white knotted cawles wrought with chain stitch" in 1587. Schetz supplied "cawles of heare lyned with taphata", and in 1601 the silkwoman Dorothy Speckard supplied "Two heare Cawles curiouslie made in workes of haire". In Scotland, the word "kell" was sometimes used for a caul. In October 1590, a "kell of gold" and two "kellis of sillver" were provided for Anne of Denmark.

In John Dryden's translation of the Aeneid, he describes Dido as wearing a "golden caul".
