= The Dream (Byron poem) =

1816 poem by Lord Byron

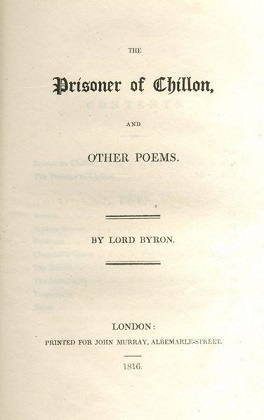
First appeared in the 1816 first edition.

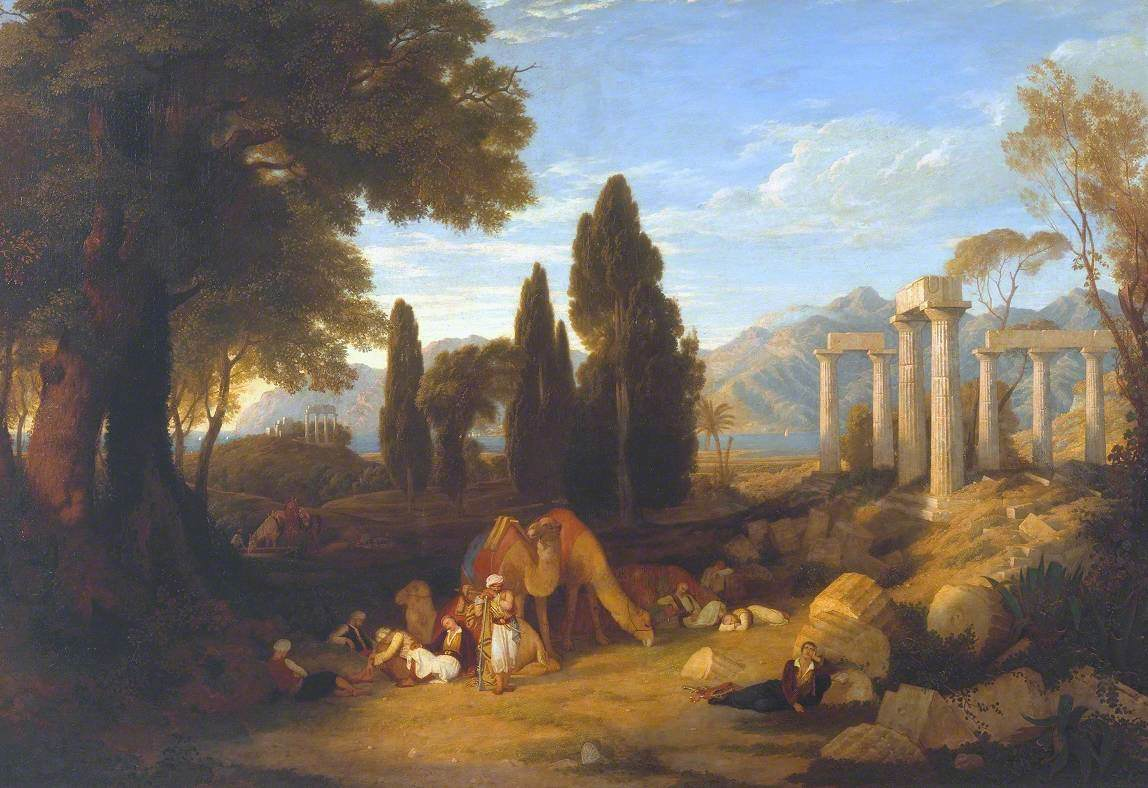
Charles Lock Eastlake's 1827 painting Lord Byron's Dream inspired by the poem.

The Dream is a poem written by Lord Byron in 1816. It has been described as expressing "central Romantic beliefs about dreams". It also describes the view from the Misk Hills, close to Byron's ancestral home in Newstead, Nottinghamshire. Mary Chaworth of Annesley Hall, a distant relation for whom Byron had a boyhood passion, is the "Maid" of the poem.

The poem was published in 1816 in London by John Murray as part of The Prisoner of Chillon collection.

== Themes ==
The poem is an autobiographical and sorrowful recollection and reflection on unrequited love, memory, and the power of dreams to disclose to us painful and wrenching discoveries. It explores a "Byronic hero" who is haunted by a childhood love who married another. It would lead to mutual misery, resulting in her madness and his life of loneliness and rootlessness.

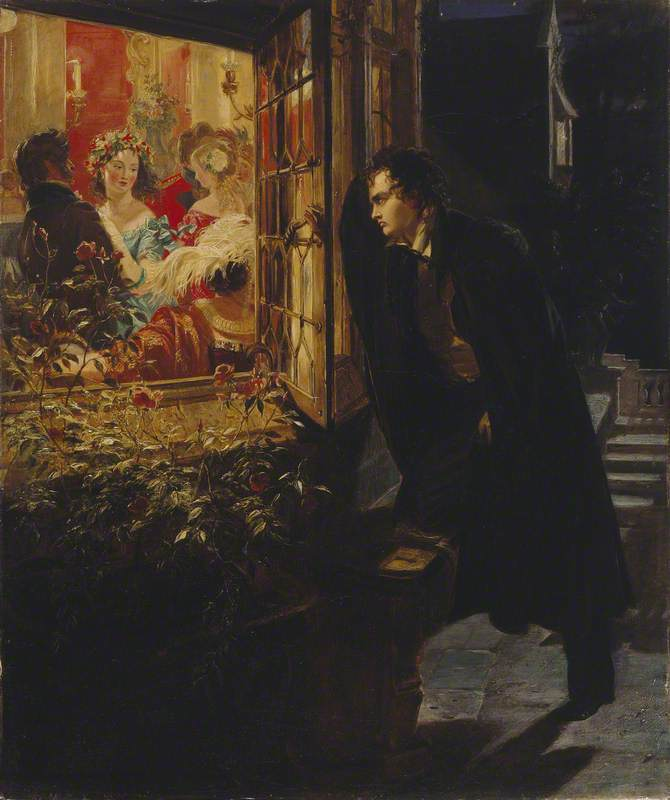
Byron's Early Love by Edward Matthew Ward, 1856

The poem centers on Byron's real-life unrequited love for his cousin, Mary Anne Chaworth. He had a childhood infatuation with her when he lived at Misk Hills.

The poem is set up where each scene is introduced by the refrain, "A change came o'er the spirit of my dream". Dreams are perceived as a "telescope of truth," allowing for a deeper and more complex experience of our past than conscious reflection. The subconscious presents a truer picture.

The plot reveals the two lovers the two lovers choosing different and separate paths. The woman marries another but experiences no happiness. The man becomes lonely and heartbroken, roaming the world and only finding consolation in the contemplation of nature.

The key narrative elements are an intense youthful affection, betrayal, and subsequent madness.

Structurally, it combines memories of past happiness with present sorrow, shifting the places and the times to create an atmosphere of unreality to blur the distinction between the conscious and the subconscious, dreams and reality or waking life. The poem, in essence, is about the traumatic and enduring impact of an unrequited or lost love. Do what he might, the narrator cannot escape the psychological consequences of this loss. He uses a dream state as a way to explore the meanings of his grief and its influence on his memory.

== Background ==
It was written during the "Year Without a Summer" in Switzerland, shortly after his separation from his wife. The theme is autobiographical, reflecting emotionally on his childhood, his lost love for Mary Chaworth, and his residence at Misk Hills.

== Summary ==
The work is about a young man deeply in love with a young woman, based upon his real love for Mary Chaworth. But she regards him only as a friend. The woman marries another man, causing him to become a heartbroken wanderer.

Both live desperate and lonely lives. The woman succumbs to insanity and despair. The man finds consolation by contemplating the wonders of nature and solitude.

The work is structured as a series of scenes ("A change came o'er the spirit of my dream") that switch from different locales and times, combining memory with the fleeting images of dreaming.

The theme is the ability of dreams to revive memories and past impressions and sensations. The travails and agonies of unrequited love are explored. Dreams give us the "telescope of truth" as a salve. "Our life is twofold; Sleep hath its own world, A boundary between the things misnamed Death and existence ... And a wide realm of wild reality."

The "Byronic hero" is a focus of the work. The man is an outcast and melancholic wanderer whose past shapes and defines his present and future.

The poem is an autobiographical account of his youth, set near his home in Nottinghamshire, told in a personal and self-reflective way.

== Influence ==
Meridel Holland in "Lord Byron's 'The Dream' and Wuthering Heights" argued that there is "a consistent parallel between the story narrated in 'The Dream' and the story of Heathcliff in Wuthering Heights." Holland pointed out the similarities:

Both narratives deal with a love that begins with a quasi-sibling relationship which develops into a love where the boy is unswerving in his affections, but the girl is less faithful. The boy in each case goes abroad; by the time he returns the woman is married, whereupon he enters a disastrous marriage. The woman in both narratives declines into sickness and delusion, and the man enters a paranormal world. In addition, aspects of the description of Heathcliff echo words applied to Byron's hero in 'The Dream'.

Holland emphasized that the connection between the two works had earlier been shown: "The link between Byron's overhearing Mary Chaworth's cruel words at age 15, his running away and his autobiographical account of his tragic love in 'The Dream', and the episode of Heathcliff's overhearing Cathy's words at age 15, and running away, has already been noted."

== Sources ==
- Carman, Bliss, ed. The World's Best Poetry. Philadelphia: John D. Morris and Company, 1904.
- Holland, Meridel. "Lord Byron's 'The Dream' and Wuthering Heights."

March 2009. Bronte Studies 34(1):31-46. DOI:10.1179/147489309X427859

- Marchand, Leslie A., ed. (1982). Lord Byron: Selected Letters and Journals. Cambridge, MA: Harvard University Press. ISBN 978-0-674-53915-0.
- Mayne, Ethel Colburn (1912). Byron. Vol. 1. C. Scribner's Sons.
- McGann, Jerome (2013) [2004]. "Byron, George Gordon Noel (1788–1824)". Oxford Dictionary of National Biography (online ed.). Oxford University Press. doi:10.1093/ref:odnb/4279.
- Moore, Doris Langley (1974). Lord Byron Accounts Rendered. London: John Murray.
- Nicholson, Andrew, ed. (2007). The Letters of John Murray to Lord Byron. Liverpool University Press. ISBN 978-1-84631-069-0.
- Parker, Derek (1968). Byron and His World. London: Thames and Hudson.
- Pevsner, N. (1951). Nottinghamshire. Pevsner Architectural Guides: Buildings of England. Harmondsworth: Penguin.
- Rawes, Alan. "'Tears, and Tortures, and the Touch of Joy' in The Dream." The Byron Journal 27 (1999): 82-89.
