= Robin Hood Hills, Nottinghamshire =

Hills in Nottinghamshire, England

Coordinates: 53.09°N 1.22°W

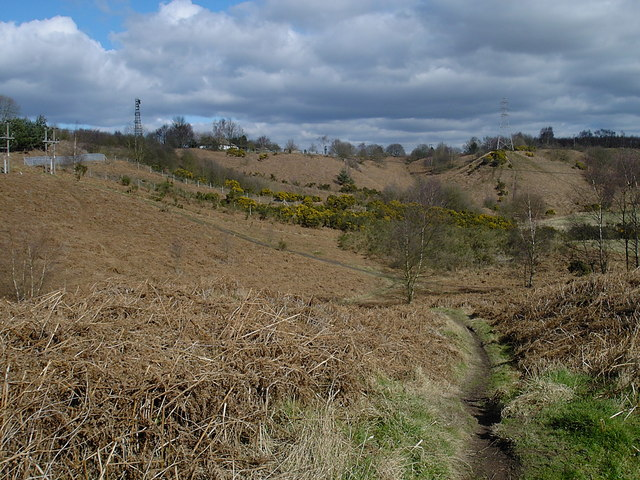
Robin Hood Hills

Robin Hood Hills or Robin Hood's Hills are a steep sided range of sandstone hills forming a natural amphitheatre surrounding the villages of Annesley and Newstead in Nottinghamshire, England. Robin Hood's Cave lies at the bottom of the hills. They rise to a height of 195 metres above sea level at Coxmoor, Kirkby-in-Ashfield. A railway tunnel passes underneath the hills on the Robin Hood Line railway between Newstead railway station and Kirkby-in-Ashfield railway station.

The highest point of the hills reaches 195 m (640 ft).
