= Farleys Brook =

Stream in Nottinghamshire, England

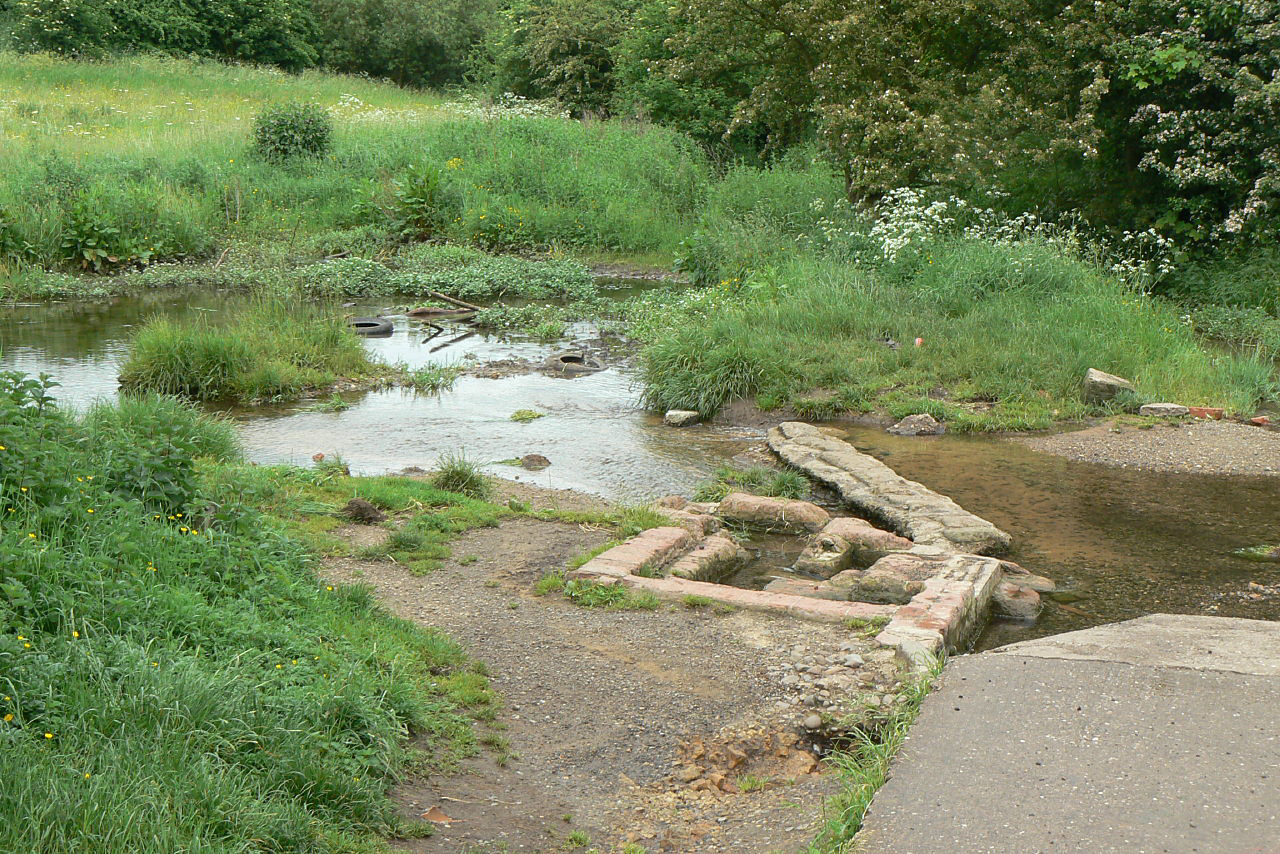
- Farleys Brook to the east of Farleys Lane, where the flow is swelled by a spring which rises in the brick structure shown.

Location
- Country: England
- County: Nottinghamshire

Physical characteristics
- Source
  - location: Misk Hills
- Mouth: River Leen
  - location: Bulwell
  - coordinates: 53°1′6″N 1°11′11″W

Farleys Brook is the name of a minor watercourse in Hucknall, Nottinghamshire. It rises in a pool within Watnall Coppice close to the M1 motorway at the foot of the Misk Hills, coordinates 53.034471 N, 1.248907 W. It flows southeastwards through the Misk Meadows, passing very briefly into Broxtowe Borough, before returning to Ashfield District, then Pennine View, and Nabbs Lane Estates, where several parks and open spaces are centred on flood prevention lagoons. The Brook flows past the former Hucknall Aerodrome and into Farleys Lane Nature Area, following the A611 Hucknall Bypass. Farleys Lane Spring rises in the Brook close to this point and a deep pool is formed which is used for drinking paddling and bathing. The Brook flows into the River Leen close to Moorbridge, Bulwell.

== Developments ==
As part of a Department for Environment, Food and Rural Affairs (DEFRA) scheme for farm conservation, a permissive path has been established alongside the brook from Farleys Lane to the dismantled railway embankment further to the east. As well as providing access to the waterside grassland for visitors, the hedgerows have been improved, and the pond to the east of Farleys Lane has been cleared, to provide a better habitat for invertebrates and birds.

The lower reaches of the brook have been designated as a Site of Importance for Nature Conservation (SINC). However, the status of this section is under threat, due to proposals for a new industrial park and the construction of 900 new homes. Access roads for the development would cross the conservation site, and objections have been raised by the Nottinghamshire Wildlife Trust, particularly because of its effect on local populations of water voles and lizards which are protected species. The developers and council have approached the Environment Agency about the possibility of culverting the watercourse in the area.

== Points of interest ==
Point	Coordinates (Links to map resources)	OS Grid Ref	Notes
Source in Watnall Coppice	53.0345°N 1.2489°W	SK504488	
Source near Misk Farm	53.0348°N 1.2394°W	SK511488	
Nabs Lane culvert	53.0308°N 1.2272°W	SK519484	
Culvert under Ruffs recreation ground	53.0287°N 1.2230°W	SK522482	beginning
Farleys Lane culvert	53.0221°N 1.2043°W	SK534474	
Culvert under dismantled railway embankment	53.0207°N 1.1981°W	SK538473	
Culvert under A611	53.0183°N 1.1878°W	SK545470	
Junction with River Leen	53.0181°N 1.1862°W	SK546470	
