= Leen Valley =

Valley in Nottinghamshire, England

Coordinates: 53.0058°N 1.1923°W

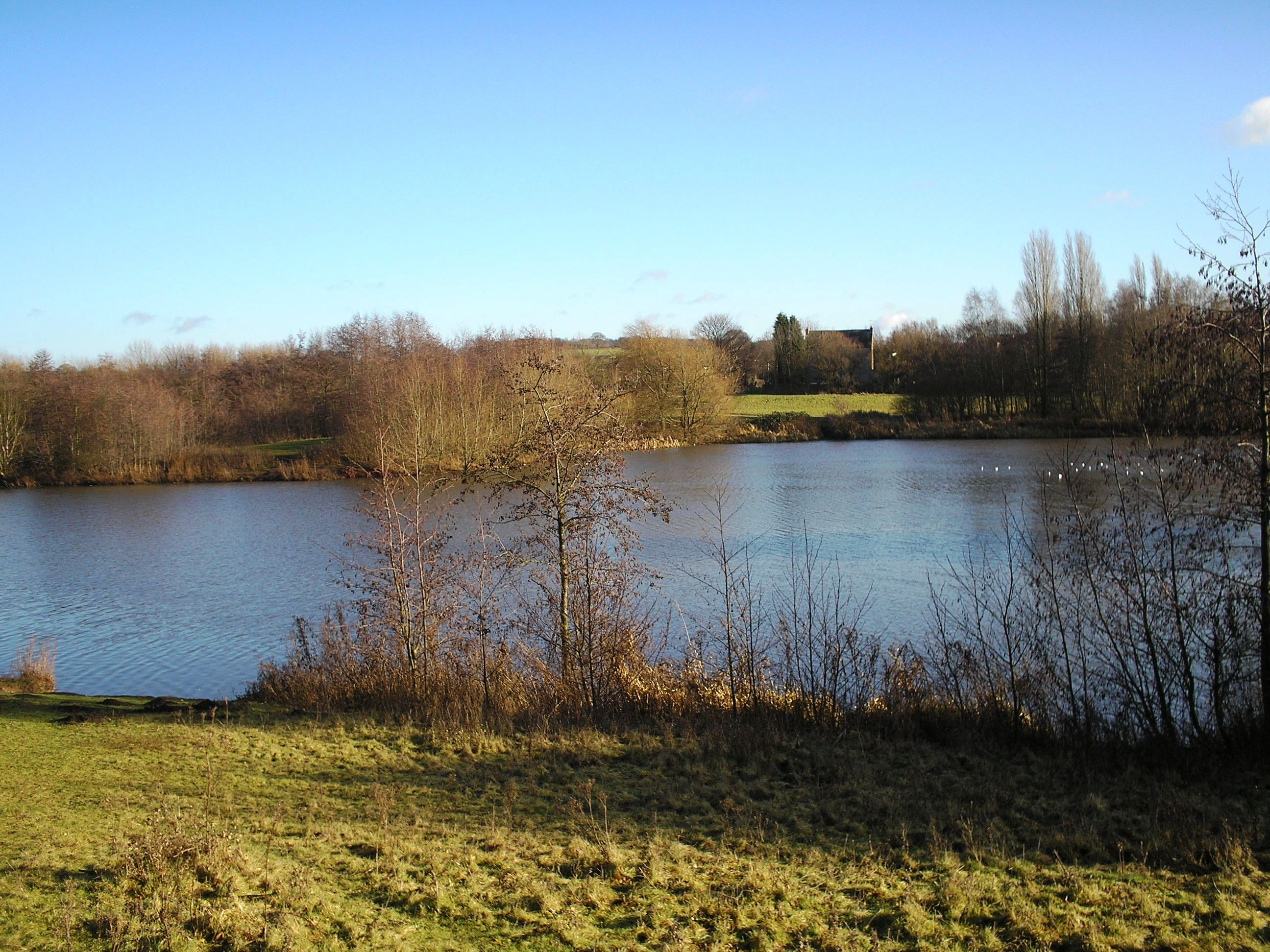
Leen Valley scenery

The Leen Valley is the wide valley formed by the River Leen within the county of Nottinghamshire.

The Leen Valley was once an important centre for hosiery and coal mining industries. Today, although light manufacturing continues, the valley is increasingly becoming part of the commuter belt for Nottingham. Settlements within the valley include Annesley, Bestwood Village, Newstead, Papplewick, Linby, Hucknall, Bulwell, Sherwood, Basford, Lenton and Nottingham. Leen Valley is also the name of one of the Council wards, which lies within Nottingham, and a housing estate in the north of Nottingham, which is located in a valley created by the Leen within the larger Leen Valley area. The population of the ward at the 2011 census was 10,702.
