= Baron Chaworth =

Barony in the Peerage of the United Kingdom

Baron Chaworth is a title that has been created three times, once in the Peerage of England, once in the Peerage of Ireland, and once in the Peerage of the United Kingdom.

The first creation was in the Peerage of England when on 6 February 1299 Thomas de Chaworth was summoned to Parliament by writ directed Thome de Chaworth, whereby he is held to have become Lord Chaurces. He was not summoned to the Parliament at Lincoln on 26 September 1300, although his name (Thomas de Chaurces, Dominus de Norton) is affixed to the Barons’ letter to the Pope of 1301. He died before 20 October 1315, when his lands were ordered to be taken into the King's hands. None of his posterity were summoned to Parliament from the time of his death until the creation by patent in 1628. When his descendant Joan Chaworth died in 1507, any barony created by the writ of 1299 is considered to have fallen into abeyance.

The second creation was the subsidiary title of the Viscount Chaworth in 1628 and was in the Peerage of Ireland. It became extinct with the viscountcy in 1693.

The third creation was of Eaton Hall in the Peerage of the United Kingdom in 1831 for the 10th Irish Earl of Meath, so he could sit in the House of Lords until 1999.

== Baron Chaworth (1299) ==
- Thomas de Chaworth, 1st Baron Chaworth (d.1315)

== Barons Chaworth (1628) ==
See Viscount Chaworth

== Barons Chaworth (1831) ==
See Earl of Meath
