= All Saints' Church, Annesley =

Church in Nottinghamshire, England

Coordinates: 53°04′38″N 01°14′17″W

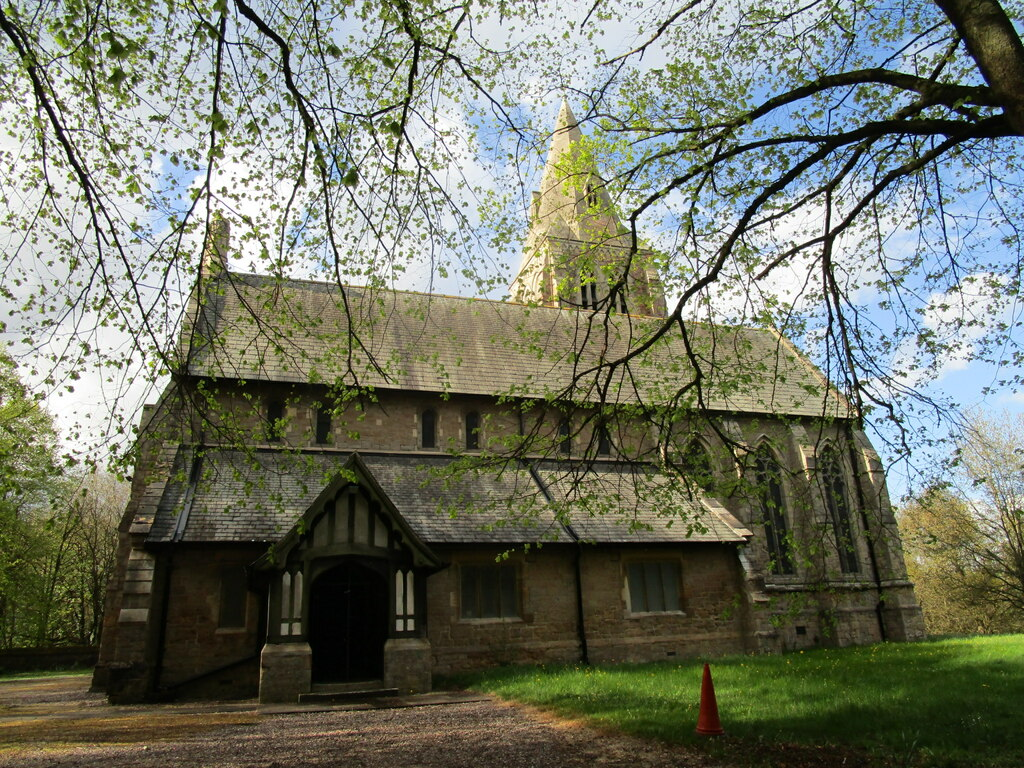
- All Saints' Church, Annesley
- Denomination: Church of England
- Churchmanship: Broad Church
- Website: https://www.allsaintsannesley.co.uk

History
- Dedication: All Saints

Administration
- Province: York
- Diocese: Southwell and Nottingham
- Parish: Annesley

All Saints' Church, Annesley is a parish church in the Church of England in Annesley, Nottinghamshire.

The church is Grade II* listed by the Department for Digital, Culture, Media and Sport as it is a particularly significant building of more than local interest.

== History ==
The church was erected in 1874 to a design by the architect Thomas Graham Jackson to replace the old church on the Annesley estate. Until 1942 services were held at both sites.

The interior of the church was destroyed by fire in 1907 but was re-opened in 1909. The chief glories of the church are the Norman font and the East window.

The church contains the achievement of arms of Patrick Chaworth, 3rd Viscount Chaworth which was moved here from the old church in 1874, as were many other monuments.

== Parish structure ==
It is in a group of parishes with

- All Saints' Church, Annesley
- St. Mary the Virgin, Newstead
- St. Mary's Church, Newstead Abbey

== Organ ==
The National Pipe Organ Register lists the organ to be a three manual instrument built by F. Rothwell of Harrow.

=== List of organists ===
- William Henry Renshaw 1897 - c. 1912 - ????
