= Wiverton Hall =

Country house, hamlet and civil parish in Nottinghamshire, England

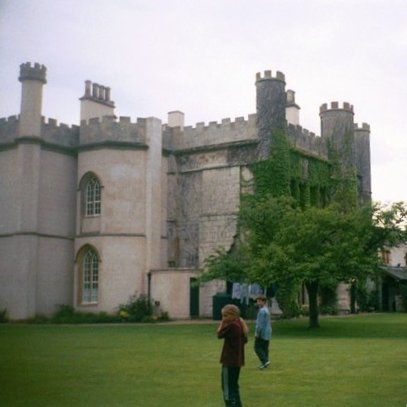

- Location in Nottinghamshire

General information
- Type: English country house
- Architectural style: Tudor Gothic Revival
- Location: Tithby, Bingham, Nottinghamshire, England
- Coordinates: 52.920112°N 0.940691°W
- Construction started: 1450 (gatehouse)
- Renovated: 1814 (converted)
- Client: Sir Thomas Chaworth

Listed Building – Grade II*
- Official name: Wiverton Hall including service range to rear left
- Designated: 12 February 1952
- Reference no.: 1264494

Wiverton Hall
- Hamlet and civil parish
- Location within Nottinghamshire
- Interactive map of Wiverton Hall
- Area: 1.64 sq mi (4.2 km^{2})
- Population: 41 (2021)
  - Density: 25/sq mi (9.7/km^{2})
- OS grid reference: SK 715363
  - London: 105 mi (169 km) SSE
- District: Rushcliffe
- Shire county: Nottinghamshire
- Region: East Midlands
- Country: England
- Sovereign state: United Kingdom
- Post town: NOTTINGHAM
- Postcode district: NG13
- Dialling code: 0115 / 01949
- UK Parliament: Rushcliffe

Wiverton Hall (sometimes pronounced /ˈwiːərtən/) is an English country house near Tithby, in the Rushcliffe district, in the county of Nottinghamshire. By 1510 the former village of Wyverton had become impoverished and reduced to just four houses and a cottage. It was in that year completely depopulated by "emparkment", when George Chaworth enlarged his park by 254 acres (103 ha). All but the Grade II* listed gatehouse of the mansion was destroyed in the English Civil War. The current house dates from 1814. The location is also the centre of a wider civil parish with the same name, which had 41 residents at the 2021 census.

== History ==
Wiverton Hall is considered to have been established by Sir Thomas Chaworth (died 1458/59) in 1450. In 1627 his descendant, Sir George Chaworth (died 1639) was created Viscount Chaworth of Armagh, and his son John Chaworth (died 1644) the second Viscount, was living at Wiverton.

=== English Civil War ===
Lord Chaworth supported Charles I of England and in December 1642 fortified Wiverton Hall to make it a garrison for the King. In June 1643, Queen Henrietta, on her way from Newark, wrote to the King: "I shall sleep at Werton [Wiverton], and thence to Ashby, where we will resolve what way to take." Among other royal guests were Prince Rupert of the Rhine and his brother Prince Maurice, who after visiting the King in Newark rode to Wiverton with about 400 troops and stayed there until they could settle their plans. It was from Wiverton that Prince Rupert addressed a letter to the Parliament, successfully asking for a pass for himself, his brother, and other noblemen and gentlemen to leave England.

On 4 November 1645, the garrison commanded by Lord Chaworth surrendered to troops under Major-General Sydnam Poyntz. Poyntz had taken Shelford Priory by storm on the previous day. He went to Wiverton and destroyed it to prevent its use as a garrison.

=== Current building ===
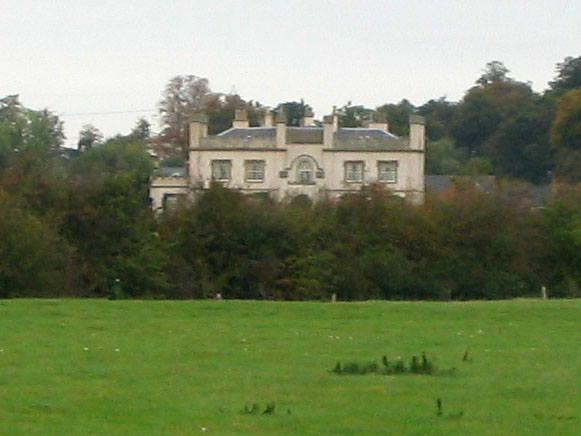
Wiverton Hall

The surviving gatehouse was then used as a farmhouse until the early 19th century. The current house was erected in 1814 in the Tudor Gothic Revival style. In its restored form the mansion remained the property of the Chaworths until the family became extinct in the direct male line. Mary Chaworth conveyed the property to the family of Musters by her marriage in August 1805 to John Musters of Colwick Hall.

At the beginning of the 20th century, the hall was the home of John Patricius Chaworth-Musters who also owned Annesley Hall. He and his wife had six sons, five of whom fought in the First World War. Of these Patricius George died of wounds in 1915, Philip Mundy was killed in action in 1917 and Robert, weakened by poison gas, died of influenza in 1918.

Between 1923 and 1938 the house was let to tenants, one of whom was Mrs D'Oyley Ransome. In 1938 it was sold by John Neville Chaworth-Musters to the Crown along with its estate of 2,170 acres (880 ha), and was for a period the home of Major-General Sir Miles Graham and Lady Graham. During the Grahams' time, a visit was made there by Bernard Montgomery, 1st Viscount Montgomery of Alamein on 21 August 1948.

== Anglican parishes ==
The hall gives its name to the Wiverton Hall ward of Rushcliffe Borough Council, as well as the group of Anglican parishes that surround it:

- All Saints' Church, Granby
- St Andrew's Church, Langar
- St Giles's Church, Cropwell Bishop
- Holy Trinity Church, Tythby
- St John's Church, Colston Bassett
- St Mary's Church, Barnstone (not currently in use)
- St Michael and All Angels' Church, Elton on the Hill

== See also ==
- Grade II* listed buildings in Nottinghamshire
- Listed buildings in Wiverton Hall
