= Annesley Hall, Nottinghamshire =

Grade II listed country house in Nottinghamshire, England

Annesley Hall
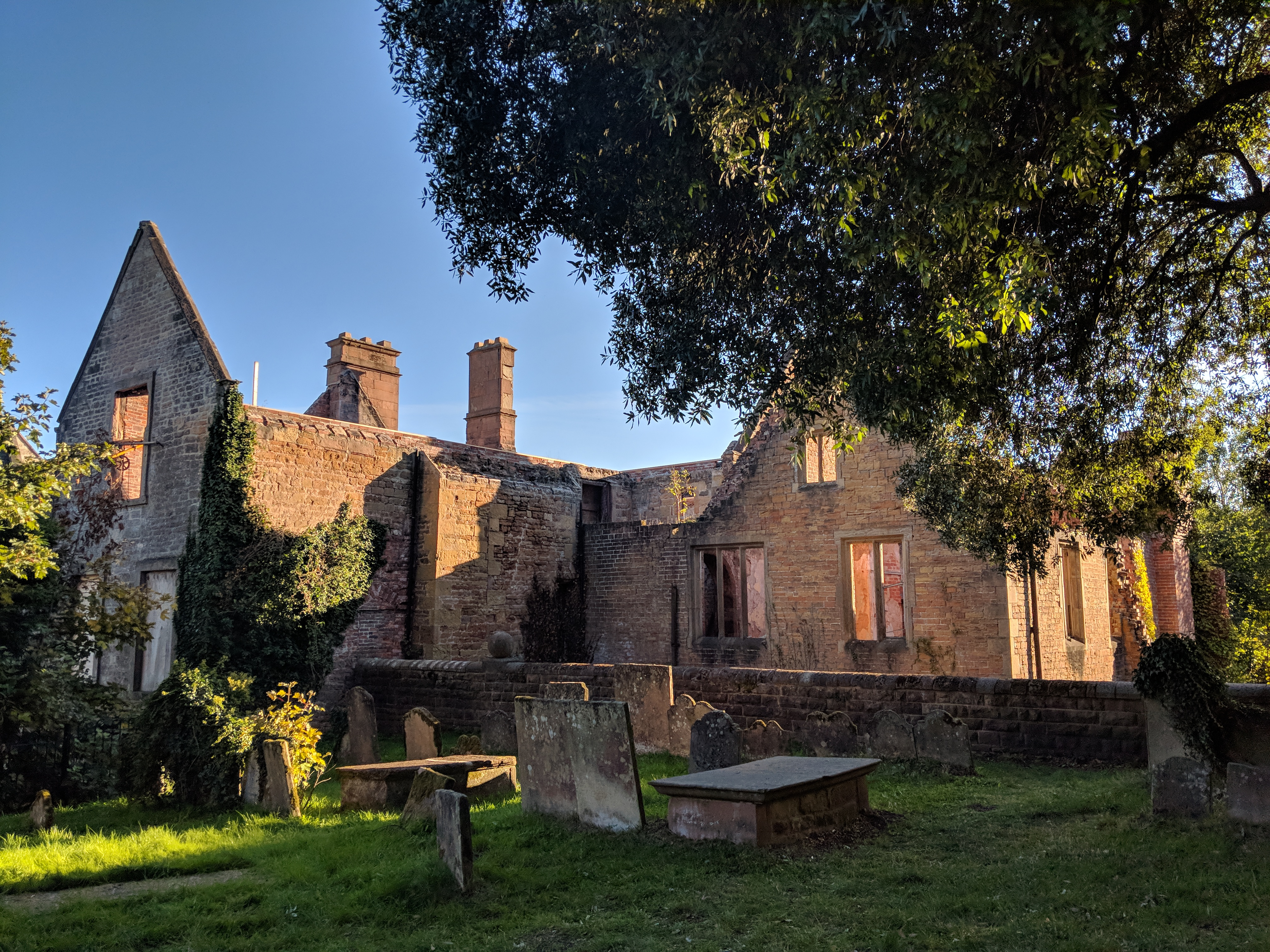

- Location within Nottinghamshire
- 53.065582°N 1.250818°W
- Type: House and garden
- Location: Annesley, Nottinghamshire

Site notes
- Governing body: Privately owned

National Register of Historic Parks and Gardens
- Official name: Annesley Hall park and garden
- Designated: 1 January 1986
- Reference no.: 1001077

Listed Building – Grade II
- Official name: Annesley Hall
- Designated: 14 May 1952
- Reference no.: 1234836

Listed Building – Grade II
- Official name: Gatehouse range at Annesley Hall
- Designated: 13 October 1966
- Reference no.: 1234843

Listed Building – Grade II
- Official name: Terrace to southwest of Annesley Hall
- Designated: 13 October 1966
- Reference no.: 1234839

Listed Building – Grade II
- Official name: Annesley Lodge
- Designated: 12 October 1988
- Reference no.: 1234846

Listed Building – Grade II
- Official name: Gatepier at South Lodge, Annesley Hall
- Designated: 13 October 1966
- Reference no.: 1235003

Annesley Hall is a Grade II listed country house near Annesley in Nottinghamshire, England and the ancestral home of the Chaworth-Musters family. The 13th-century park, 17th-century terraces and 19th-century pleasure gardens and walled gardens of the hall are Grade II* listed on the Register of Historic Parks and Gardens.

== History ==
The Hall dates from the mid-13th century and was the home of the Annesley family, passing to the Chaworth family when Alice, heiress to the Manor of Annesley, married George Chaworth, third son of Sir Thomas Chaworth of Wiverton, in the 15th century. The Chaworth family were to possess the estate for the next 350 years. It was significantly enlarged and improved by Patrick Chaworth, 3rd Viscount Chaworth, in the 17th century when damage to his family seat at Wiverton obliged him to move to Annesley.

Mary Chaworth, who lived at the Hall, was the boyhood lover of the poet Lord Byron, who lived at nearby Newstead Abbey. Byron's poem "The Dream" concerns the meeting of two lovers on Diadem Hill, part of the Misk Hills range, which belonged to the Annesley estate. The uncle of the poet Byron had killed William Chaworth in a duel at the Star and Garter tavern in Pall Mall, London after a meeting of the "Nottinghamshire Club" that met there every month. Mary Chaworth eventually married John Musters of Colwick Hall in 1805. Their teenage son, Charles Musters, sailed as a Volunteer 1st Class aboard HMS Beagle with Charles Darwin, but died of malaria in South America on 19 May 1832. The Chaworth-Musters family became one of the most powerful families in Nottinghamshire. John Chaworth-Musters was appointed High Sheriff of Nottinghamshire for 1864–65. Structural alterations to the hall took place in the 18th and 19th centuries, including the addition of a service wing c.1880.

== 20th and 21st century ==
It remained in the hands of the Chaworth-Musters family until sold by Major Robert Patricius Chaworth-Musters in 1972. The new purchasers carried out extensive internal alterations and removed many of the 17th century fittings. The hall suffered a fire in 1997 which caused damage to the structure and it has not been lived in since. The hall is now in private ownership, in very poor condition and not open to the public. English Heritage listed the building on the 'Buildings at Risk Register' as high vulnerability and deteriorating in 2014. Two of the three floors at the hall were severely damaged in a further fire on 16 May 2015. It remains on the risk register as at 2025.

== Historic listing designations ==
The gardens and parkland of the hall are listed at Grade II* on the Register of Historic Parks and Gardens. The hall itself is listed at Grade II. Also listed at Grade II are: the Gatehouse Range; a garden terrace; the main lodge; and a gatepier at a secondary lodge.

== Annesley Old Church ==
Annesley Old Church, near to the hall, is a grade I listed building and a scheduled ancient monument. It is on the Heritage at Risk register but the Heritage Lottery Fund has awarded £450,000 towards its conservation.

== Gallery ==
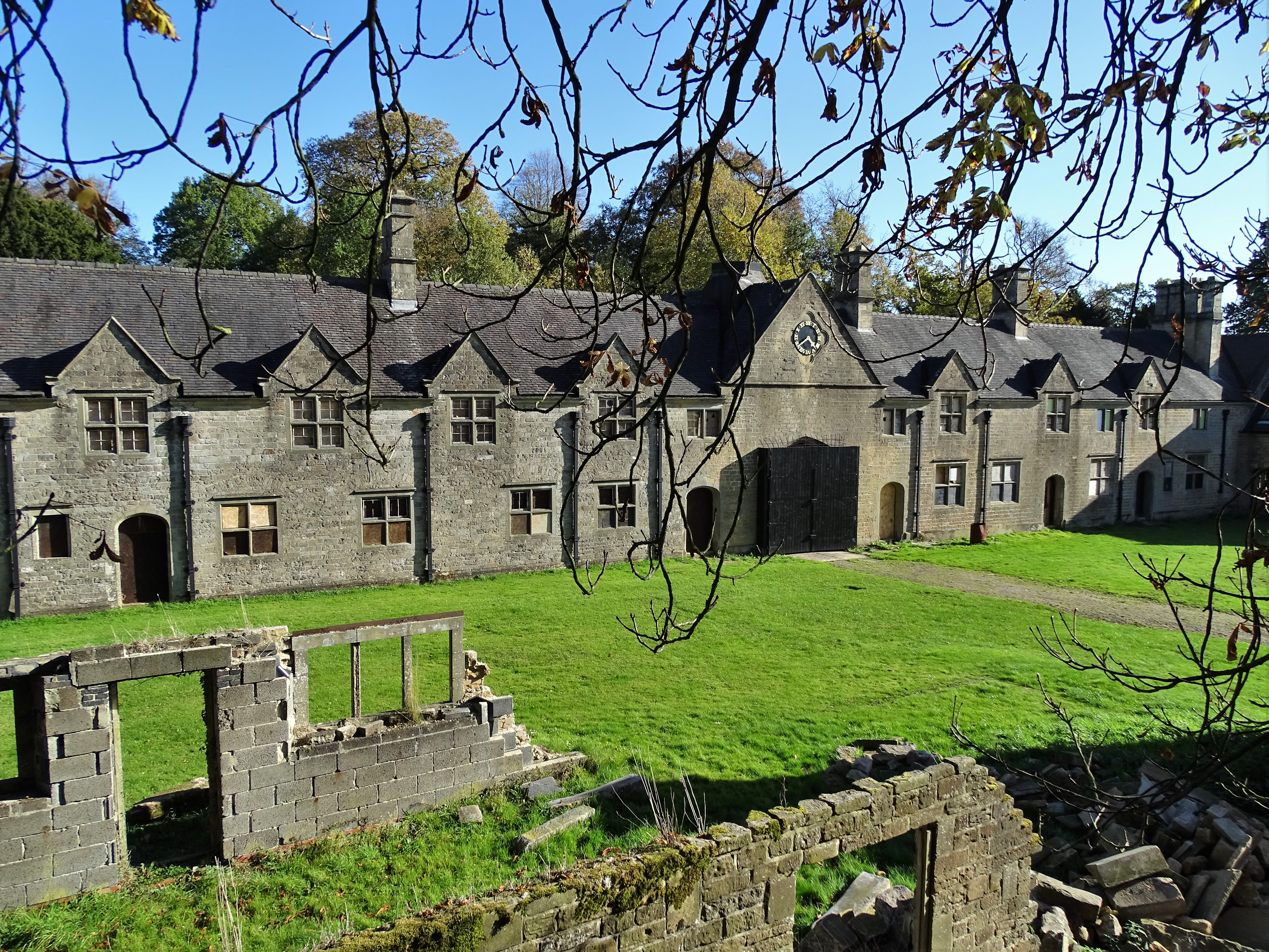
The Gatehouse Range

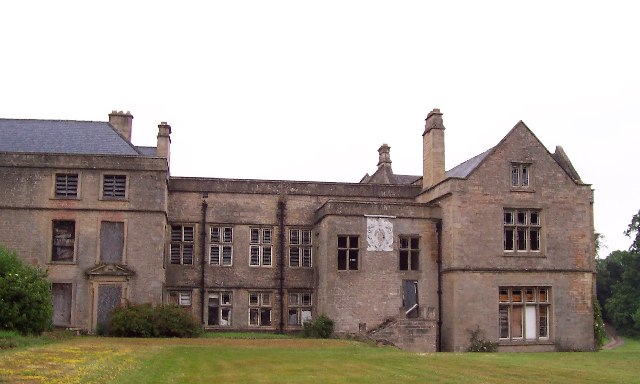
The hall in 2005

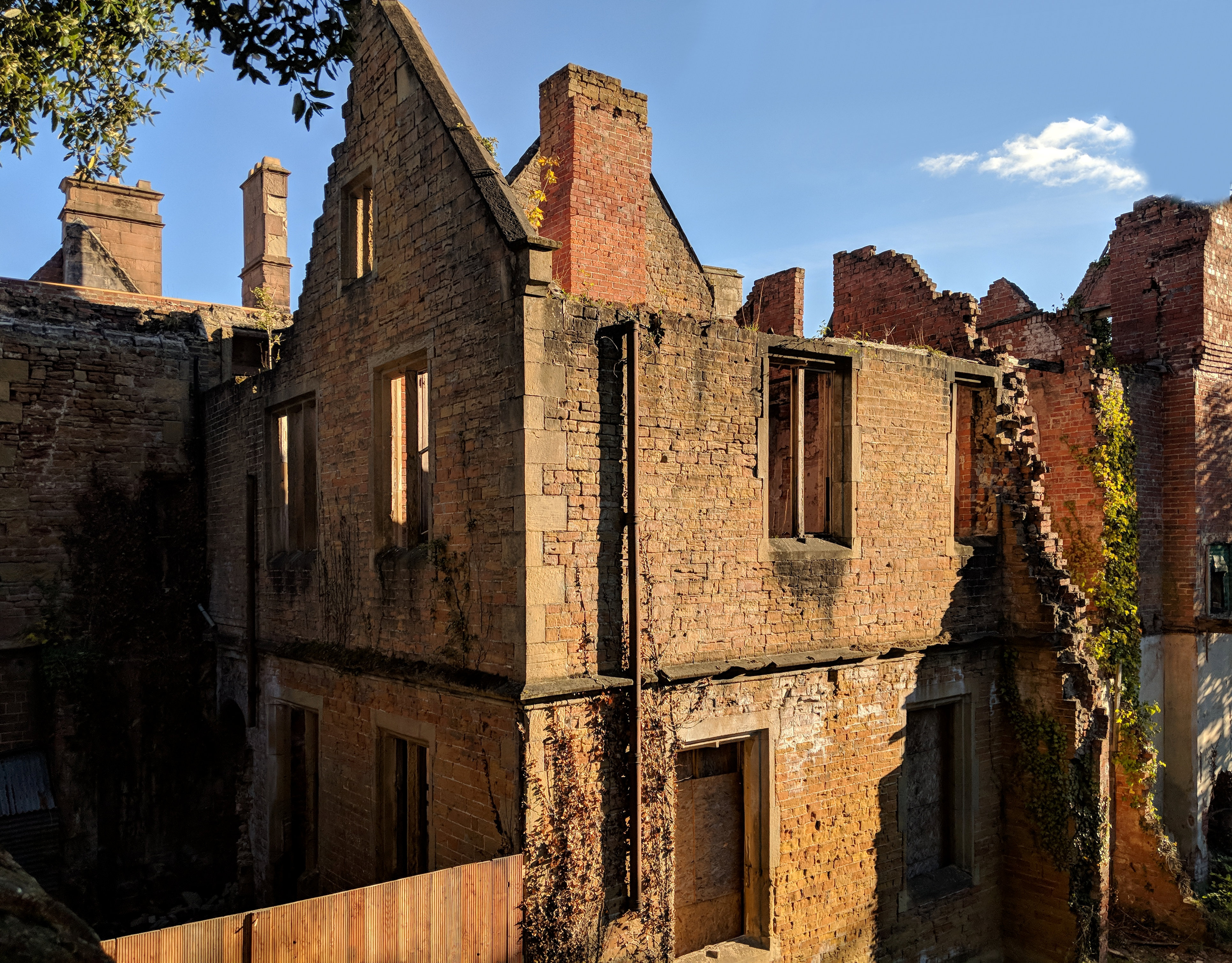
The roofless hall in 2018
