= Viscount Chaworth =

Viscount Chaworth, of Armagh in the County of Armagh, was a title in the Peerage of Ireland. It was created on 4 March 1628 for George Chaworth, who had earlier represented East Retford, Nottinghamshire and Arundel in the House of Commons. He was made Baron Chaworth, of Tryme in the County of Meath, at the same time, also in the Peerage of Ireland. He was High Sheriff of Nottinghamshire in 1638.

The titles became extinct on the death of his grandson, the third Viscount in 1693. The late Viscount's daughter the Hon. Juliana married Chambre Brabazon, 5th Earl of Meath. In 1831 the Chaworth title was revived when their great-grandson, John Chambre Brabazon, 10th Earl of Meath, was created Baron Chaworth in the Peerage of the United Kingdom. This title is still extant.

The family seat was Wiverton Hall Nottinghamshire, but moved to Annesley Hall, Nottinghamshire after Wiverton was slighted in the Civil War..

== Viscounts Chaworth (1628) ==
- George Chaworth, 1st Viscount Chaworth (died 1639)
- John Chaworth, 2nd Viscount Chaworth (died 1644)
- Patrick Chaworth, 3rd Viscount Chaworth (1635–1693)

== See also ==
- Earl of Meath
