= Annesley =

Village and civil parish in Nottinghamshire, England

Coordinates: 53.081°N 1.245°W

- Village and civil parish
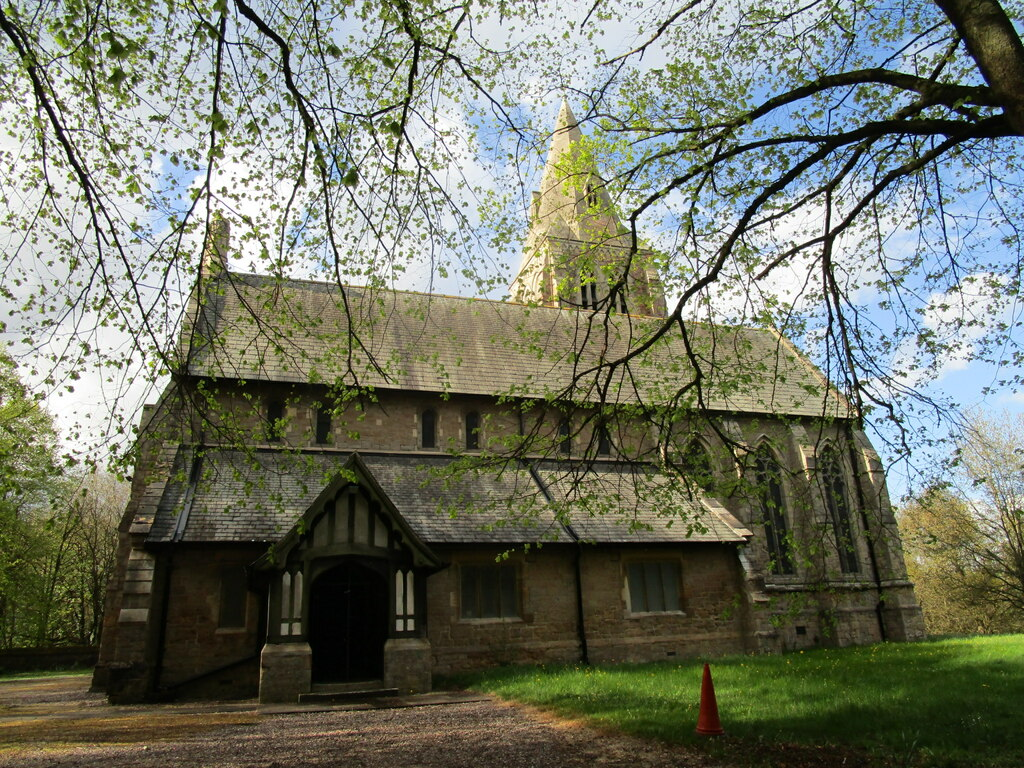
- All Saints Church

- Location within Nottinghamshire
- Interactive map of Annesley
- Area: 4.85 sq mi (12.6 km^{2})
- Population: 1,814 (2021)
  - Density: 374/sq mi (144/km^{2})
- OS grid reference: SK 508534
  - London: 115 mi (185 km) SSE
- District: Ashfield
- Shire county: Nottinghamshire
- Region: East Midlands
- Country: England
- Sovereign state: United Kingdom
- Places: Annesley; Annesley Lane End; Annesley Woodhouse (part)
- Post town: Sutton-in-Ashfield
- Postcode district: NG15 & NG17
- Dialling code: 01623
- Police: Nottinghamshire
- Fire: Nottinghamshire
- Ambulance: East Midlands
- UK Parliament: Ashfield
- Website: www.annesleyfelley-pc.org.uk

Annesley is a village and civil parish in the Ashfield district of Nottinghamshire, England, between Hucknall and Kirkby-in-Ashfield. At the 2011 census, it had a population of 1,162 (including Annesley Woodhouse to the west), and this increased to 1,814 at the 2021 census.

Annesley Hall is a grade two listed building, once owned by the Chaworth-Musters family, which has connections to the Byron family of nearby Newstead Abbey. Annesley Old Church was mentioned by Lord Byron and D. H. Lawrence. There is also close by the earthworks of Annesley Castle.

The village of Annesley Woodhouse is to the north of the parish, it mostly lies outside, instead being within the unparished area of Kirkby-in-Ashfield. The residential area of Annesley Lane End is at the north western edge of the parish and merges into neighbouring Selston.

The Misk Hills lie to the south of the village. Annesley is part of Nottinghamshire's Hidden Valleys area. The parish is grouped with the neighbouring parish of Felley to elect a joint parish council. The old church of Annesley was dedicated to All Saints. It was allowed to become derelict in the 1940s. Features of interest included the east window of the south aisle, the 13th century sedilia and the 17th century royal arms in stucco.

The village is on the A611 for Mansfield near junction 27 of the M1. Nearby to the south is the roundabout with the A608, which is now a thoroughfare to Sherwood Park Enterprise Zone.

It was connected to Nottingham by rail until Annesley railway station closed in 1953.

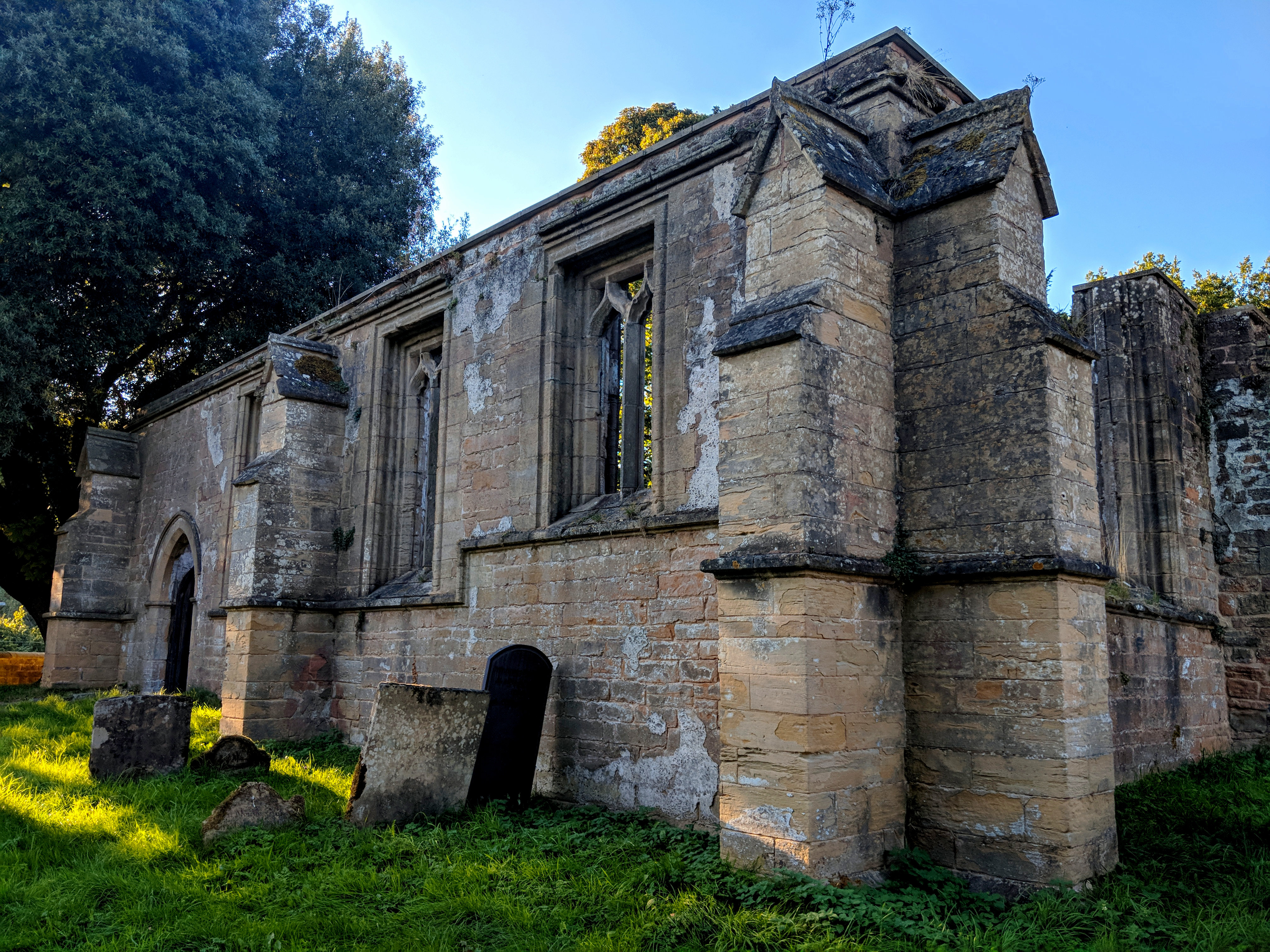
Annesley Old Church

== See also ==
- All Saints' Church, Annesley (1874)
- Annesley Old Church (1356)
- Annesley Hall
