= St Andrew's Church, Langar =

Coordinates: 52°54′17″N 00°55′44″W

St Andrew's Church, Langar-cum-Barnstone
- St Andrew's Church, Langar-cum-Barnstone
- St Andrew's Church, Langar-cum-Barnstone
- Denomination: Church of England
- Churchmanship: Broad Church
- Website: www.wivertoninthevale.co.uk/saint-andrew-langar/

History
- Dedication: St Andrew

Administration
- Province: York
- Diocese: Southwell and Nottingham
- Parish: Langar, Nottinghamshire

Clergy
- Rector: Vacant

St Andrew's Church, Langar-cum-Barnstone, is a parish church in the Church of England in Langar, Nottinghamshire. It is Grade I listed as a building of outstanding architectural or historic interest.

== History ==
The church is often called the "Cathedral of the Vale" for its size relative to the village, which lies in the Vale of Belvoir. This may have come about in part through its importance as a place of pilgrimage in Saxon times.

The church was heavily restored by Thomas Butler in 1860. It contains memorials to Scrope Howe, 1st Viscount Howe (died 1712), Emanuel Scrope Howe, 2nd Viscount Howe (died 1734), and Richard Howe, 1st Earl Howe (died 1799).

The north transept contains monuments to the Chaworth family of nearby Wiverton Hall. In the south transept is a magnificent monument to Thomas, Lord Scrope (died 1609) and his wife, Philadelphia (died 1628), with their son, Emanuel, kneeling at their feet. This transept also contains the blocked entrance to the Howe tomb, with a tablet to the memory of Admiral Howe, second daughter Mary Juliana Howe and Mary, Countess Howe.

== Current parish status ==
St Andrew's Church, Langar-cum-Barnstone, belongs to the Wiverton group of parishes, which includes St Giles's Church, Cropwell Bishop, All Saints' Church, Granby, Holy Trinity Church, Tythby, St John's Church, Colston Bassett, St Mary's Church, Barnstone, and St Michael and All Angels' Church, Elton on the Hill.

== Organ ==
The organ came from St James' Church, Codnor, and arrived in 1906. It is of unknown origin but was enlarged in Codnor in 1876 by Lloyd of Nottingham and installed in Langar by the same firm. The specifications of the organ can be found on the National Pipe Organ Register.

== See also ==
- Grade I listed buildings in Nottinghamshire
- Listed buildings in Langar cum Barnstone

== Sources ==
- Elizabeth Williamson, The Buildings of England, Nottinghamshire (1979) ISBN 978-0-300-09636-1
