= Tithby =

Village and civil parish in Nottinghamshire, England

Coordinates: 52.92°N 0.96°W

- Hamlet and civil parish
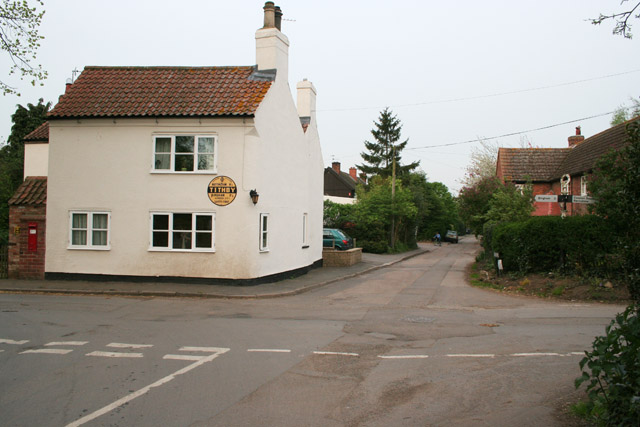
- Tithby

- Location within Nottinghamshire
- Interactive map of Tithby
- Area: 1.25 sq mi (3.2 km^{2})
- Population: 69 (2021)
  - Density: 55/sq mi (21/km^{2})
- OS grid reference: SK 681848
  - London: 105 mi (169 km) SSE
- Civil parish: Tithby
- District: Rushcliffe
- Shire county: Nottinghamshire
- Region: East Midlands
- Country: England
- Sovereign state: United Kingdom
- Post town: NOTTINGHAM
- Postcode district: NG13
- Dialling code: 0115 / 01949
- Police: Nottinghamshire
- Fire: Nottinghamshire
- Ambulance: East Midlands
- UK Parliament: Rushcliffe

Tithby (sometimes spelt "Tythby", locally pronounced "Tidby") is an English hamlet in the Rushcliffe borough of Nottinghamshire, about 2.6 miles (4.2 km) south of the market town of Bingham. The civil parishes of Tithby and Wiverton Hall have a joint annual parish meeting. Tithby reported a population of 69 people at the 2021 census.

Tithby has 6 listed buildings including a K6 Telephone Kiosk.

== Location and governance ==
Tithby is made up largely of farms and farmhouses, much like other local villages such as Colston Bassett, Cropwell Butler, Cropwell Bishop, Langar, and Barnstone.

Tithby shares a parish meeting with Wiverton Hall. The village forms part of the borough of Rushcliffe and of the Parliamentary Constituency of Rushcliffe. The county authority is Nottinghamshire.

== Amenities and transport ==
The nearest schools, shops and other amenities are in Bingham and Cropwell Bishop. There is a pub, the Plough Inn, at Cropwell Butler (1.2 miles/2 km).

Tithby has no public transport of its own. The nearest bus stops are in Cropwell Butler (1 mile/1.6 km) and in Bingham (2.5 miles/4 km), which also has a railway station (2.7 miles/4.3 km) on the Nottingham–Grantham line.

== Church ==
The Anglican parish church is the Grade I listed Holy Trinity. Tythby (the ecclesiastical parish is so spelt) is one of the Wiverton group of parishes, whose incumbent since 2019 has been the Rev. Rachel Mitchell.

== See also ==
- Listed buildings in Tithby
