= Geoffrey Huskinson =

Geoffrey Huskinson may refer to:

- Geoffrey Huskinson (cricketer) (1900–1982), English cricketer
- Geoffrey Huskinson (cartoonist) (1935–2018), English cartoonist and cricketer
