= Langar Hall =

House in Langar, Nottinghamshire, England

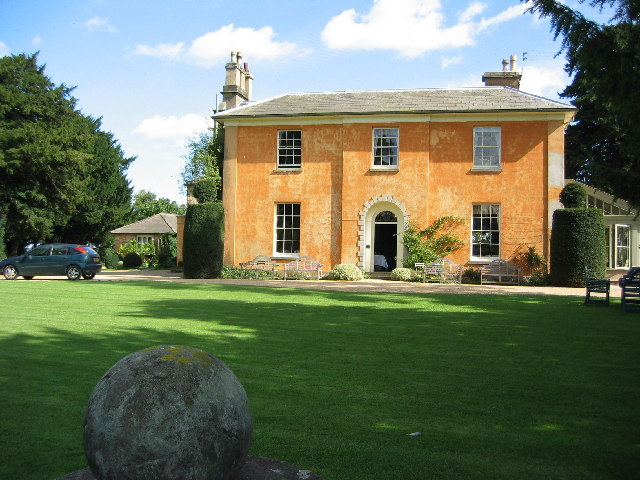
- Langar Hall
- Interactive map of the Langar Hall area

General information
- Location: Langar, Nottinghamshire
- Coordinates: 52°54′15.9″N 0°55′48″W

Height
- Architectural: Georgian

Design and construction
- Designations: Grade II listed

Langar Hall is a Grade II listed house, now a hotel, next to the church in Langar, Nottinghamshire.

The current building dates back to the 18th century, but parts are "probably a survival of an earlier building".

== History ==
The Howes came into possession of Langar Hall and its estates in 1677 through the marriage of John Grobham Howe to Annabella, one of the daughters of Emanuel Scrope, 1st Earl of Sunderland and Martha Jones. The original Norman stone castle was replaced by a three-storey stone mansion by John Howe. He died at the age of about 54 and was buried at Langar.

Scrope Howe succeeded his father to the estate. He was MP for Nottingham from 1673 to 1698, Groom of the Bedchamber to William III and Surveyor General of the Roads. He was created Baron Glenawley and Viscount Howe of Langar in 1701. He died in 1712 and was buried in Langar Church.

Emanuel Howe, 2nd Viscount Howe married Mary Sophia Charlotte von Kielmansegg, the mistress of George I, and daughter of Johann Adolf von Kielmansegg and Sophia von Kielmansegg, Countess of Darlington, illegitimate daughter of Ernest Augustus, Elector of Brunswick-Lüneburg, and his mistress Clara Elisabeth von Platen.

George Howe, 3rd Viscount Howe served as a brigadier in the American war and was killed at the Battle of Carillon in 1758.

Richard Howe (1726-1799) then succeeded to the Viscountcy. He served as a midshipman at the age of 14 and at 20 was given command of a sloop. He married in 1758 when he returned home to take possession of his estates. In 1770 he proceeded to the Mediterranean with the rank of Rear-Admiral. After the relief of Gibraltar he was made First Lord of the Admiralty and elevated to an Earl. He also received the Order of the Garter in 1797. He died in 1799 and was buried in the family vault at Langar.

In the second decade of the 19th century, the house burned down and was replaced with the present smaller one in plain Georgian design. The Howe connection with Langar ended in 1818 when the hall was sold to John Wright Esq., a Nottingham banker and part-owner of the Butterley Company at Ripley, Derbyshire. In 1830, John Wright surrendered his interest in the Butterley Company to his 24 year old son, Francis Wright.

It was then let until it was purchased by Annie Bayley, wife of Thomas Bayley, member of Parliament for Chesterfield. It then passed in turn to Revd. Fr. Bayley and then Mr. and Mrs. Huskinson, another branch of the Bayley family. By 1937 the hall and park were the property of Geoffrey Huskinson.

It was turned into a hotel from a family home by Geoffrey Huskinson's daughter, Imogen Skirving (1937–2016). who inherited it from her father in 1968 and at that time valued at £11,000. Guests at Langar Hall have included Keira Knightley, Henry Blofeld, and the Archbishop of Canterbury, and former Labour leader Ed Miliband married Justine Thornton there in 2011.

== See also ==
- Listed buildings in Langar cum Barnstone
