= Listed buildings in Langar cum Barnstone =

Langar cum Barnstone is a civil parish in the Rushcliffe district of Nottinghamshire, England. The parish contains 24 listed buildings that are recorded in the National Heritage List for England. Of these, one is listed at Grade I, the highest of the three grades, one is at Grade II*, the middle grade, and the others are at Grade II, the lowest grade. The parish contains the villages of Langar and Barnstone and the surrounding countryside. All the listed buildings are in the villages, and consist of a church, tombs and headstones in the churchyard, the churchyard wall, houses, cottages and associated structures, farmhouses and farm buildings, a public house, a former school, a war memorial and a telephone kiosk.

== Key ==
Grade	Criteria
I	Buildings of exceptional interest, sometimes considered to be internationally important
II*	Particularly important buildings of more than special interest
II	Buildings of national importance and special interest

== Buildings ==
Name and location	Photograph	Date	Notes	Grade
St Andrew's Church; 52.90453°N 0.92909°W		13th century	The church has been altered and extended through the centuries, and was heavily restored in the 1850s and 1860s. It is built in ironstone with limestone dressings, and has a cruciform plan, consisting of a nave with a clerestory, north and south aisles, a south porch, north and south transepts, a chancel, and a tower at the crossing. All the parapets are embattled. The tower has three stages, a clock face in the bottom stage, a partly-blind arcade in the middle stage, and an ornamental frieze in the top stage, and in the northeast angle with the transept is a polygonal stair turret.	I
Gateway and walls south of Langar Hall; 52.90363°N 0.92863°W	—	17th century	The gate piers are the older, with the walls dating from the 18th century. The walls are low, in brick, with half-round stone copings. On the north side, they ramp up to square rusticated stone gate piers, each with two moulded cornices and an ornamental finial. The gateway has been bricked up.	II
The Manor House; 52.91167°N 0.90999°W		17th century	The house was later extended, the original part is in blue lias limestone, the later parts are in brick, and the roofs are in slate, with some gables pedimented. There are two storeys, a double-depth plan, and a rear extension at right angles. The main range has four bays and a gabled stone porch, and most of the windows are casements.	II
The Limes Farmhouse; 52.90342°N 0.92231°W	—	Late 17th century	The farmhouse, which was extended in the 19th century, is in brick, with a floor band, dentilled eaves, the original part has a tile roof with coped gables on square kneelers, and the extension has a slate roof. The windows are casements, in the front facing the road is a stair window, and at the junction of the two ranges is a doorway with a hood on shaped brackets.	II
Headstones in the angle of the south transept and chancel 52.90447°N 0.92882°W		1713	The six headstones are in the churchyard of St Andrew's Church, four are in slate and two in limestone. They have different shapes, and contain varying decorations and inscriptions. The legible dates are between 1713 and 1732.	II
The Unicorn's Head Public House; 52.90371°N 0.92483°W		1717	The public house is in brick, with a floor band, and tile roofs with coped gables on square kneelers. There are two storeys, a double-depth plan, and a three-bay main range. On the front is a square porch, and the windows are casements. To the left is a single-storey two-bay brew house, with a three-stage chimney stack, each stage reducing and containing a blind arch. The date is picked out in coloured brick in the right gable end.	II
Headstones south of the nave 52.90433°N 0.92904°W		1720	The 28 headstones are in the churchyard of St Andrew's Church, and are mainly in slate. They have different shapes, and contain varying decorations and inscriptions. The dates are between 1720 and 1810.	II
Barn Court; 52.90236°N 0.92599°W	—	Early 18th century	The barn, which was converted into a house in the 1980s, is in brick, and has a pantile roof with gable copings on square kneelers. There were three bays, and two segmental arches, one glazed and the other with inserted windows. A cart entry has been converted into a doorway with a segmental head, and there are slit vents and roof lights.	II
Bottom House Farmhouse; 52.90244°N 0.92561°W	—	Early 18th century	The farmhouse is in brick, with a floor band, a dentilled eaves cornice, and a tile roof with gable copings on square kneelers. There are two storeys and attics, a double-depth plan, the main range with a symmetrical front of three bays, and a single-storey rear wing with a pantile roof. The central doorway has a trellis porch, flanked by sash windows with segmental heads and keystones, and there are smaller windows in the upper floor.	II
Church Cottage; 52.90447°N 0.92787°W	—	Early 18th century	A row of cottages combined into one, it is in brick with a pantile roof. There is a single storey and attics, and four bays. In the centre is a lean-to porch, the windows are casements, and on each front are four gabled dormers.	II
Langar House; 52.90500°N 0.92724°W		Early 18th century	A small country house in brick, with a floor band, and a hipped and sprocketed Welsh slate roof. There are two storeys and attics, a symmetrical front of five bays, a lean-to on the left, and a rear extension. In the centre is a doorway with a moulded surround, a pulvinated frieze and a dentilled segmental pediment. The windows are sashes, and in the attic are three gabled dormers. On the three-bay right return is a doorway with a hood on console brackets.	II*
Headstones against west churchyard wall 52.90425°N 0.92935°W		1728	The three headstones are in the churchyard of St Andrew's Church, one is in slate and the others are in limestone. They have different shapes, and contain varying decorations and inscriptions. The legible dates are 1728 and 1734.	II
Churchyard wall 52.90431°N 0.92859°W	—	18th century	The wall along the east side of the churchyard of St Andrew's Church is in brick, with shaped stone coping at the north end, and concrete coping at the south end. It is 1.3 metres (4 ft 3 in) high and 100 metres (330 ft) long, and contains a later gateway.	II
Langar Hall and service wing 52.90449°N 0.92968°W		18th century	A large house, to which a service wing incorporating earlier material was added in the 19h century, later converted into a hotel. The house is rendered, on a stone plinth, with corner pilaster strips, and a hipped slate roof with oversailing eaves. There are two storeys and a symmetrical front of three bays, the middle bay slightly projecting. The central doorway has a round arch and an alternately blocked rusticated surround, and the windows are sashes. The service wing is in brick with a slate roof, hipped to the right and gabled with coping on the left. There are two storeys and seven bays. In the right part are sash windows with segmental heads, and in the later left part are casement windows and an elliptical-headed cart entrance.	II
Entrance gate piers, Langar Hall; 52.90467°N 0.92881°W		18th century	The gate piers flanking the entrance to the drive are square, in brick, and have moulded stone caps and ball finials.	II
Garden wall and gateway, Langar House; 52.90482°N 0.92808°W	—	18th century	The boundary walls enclosing the garden to the west and south of the house are in brick with taller brick coping, and in blue brick at the west end. The walls are over 2 metres (6 ft 7 in) high, and extend for 60 metres (200 ft) on the south side, with buttresses. On the west side is a gateway flanked by brick piers with stone orb finials, and contain ornamental iron gates.	II
The Rookery; 52.91215°N 0.90930°W		Mid 18th century	A house, later divided, it is in brick, with a floor band, a dentilled eaves cornice, and a tile roof with dentilled gables. There are two storeys and attics, and five bays. On the front are paired doorways, the windows are casements, and all the openings have segmental heads.	II
Roadside Farmhouse and barn 52.91208°N 0.90742°W		Late 18th century	The farmhouse and barn are in brick. The house has a floor band, a two-tier eaves cornice, and a tile roof with coped gables on square kneelers. There are two storeys and four bays, a trellised porch, and a doorway with a fanlight, and the windows are casements with segmental heads. To the right is a lower single-bay extension, and the barn is to the left. This has a full-height square-headed cart entry and vents in a diamond pattern.	II
Crosland chest tomb 52.90427°N 0.92935°W	—	1790	The tomb in the churchyard of St Andrew's Church is to the memory of members of the Crosland family. It is a rectangular chest tomb in stone, with vases on the corners, and a top slab with a moulded edge. On the ends and sides are inscribed panels with moulded edges.	II
Former cattlesheds, Bottom House Farm; 52.90259°N 0.92597°W	—	Late 18th or early 19th century	The former cattlesheds are in brick, with dentilled eaves and hipped pantile roofs. They have a single storey, they form a low range enclosing a farmyard, and contain various openings.	II
Former stable range and garage, Bottom House Farm; 52.90255°N 0.92574°W	—	Early 19th century (probable)	The stable range was partly rebuilt and converted into a house in the 1980s. It is in brick, with dentilled eaves and a pantile roof. There are four bays, the middle two bays projecting, and containing round-arched panels with imposts and inserted doorways with segmental heads. The outer bays contain segmental-headed windows, and to the left is a lean-to linking with the garage, which has a hipped roof.	II
School and school house 52.90405°N 0.92773°W		1842	The former school and school house are in brick with stone dressings, a moulded eaves cornice, and a slate roof with stone coped gables and moulded and gabled kneelers. The building is in Tudor style, and consists of a single-storey central range flanked by two-storey gabled cross-wings. In the centre is a gabled porch with an arched doorway, above which is a datestone, and the windows are mullioned.	II
War memorial 52.90446°N 0.92869°W		1920	The war memorial is in the churchyard of St Andrew's Church. It is in Doulting stone, and consists of a cross with a circular nimbus, on a chamfered shaft. This stands on a square plinth on a base of three steps. On the plinth are inscriptions and the names of those lost in the two World Wars.	II
Telephone kiosk 52.90359°N 0.92498°W		1935	The K6 type telephone kiosk outside the Unicorns Head public house was designed by Giles Gilbert Scott. Constructed in cast iron with a square plan and a dome, it has three unperforated crowns in the top panels.	II
