= St Giles's Church, Cropwell Bishop =

Church in Nottinghamshire, England

Coordinates: 52°54′46″N 00°58′59″W

St Giles' Church, Cropwell Bishop
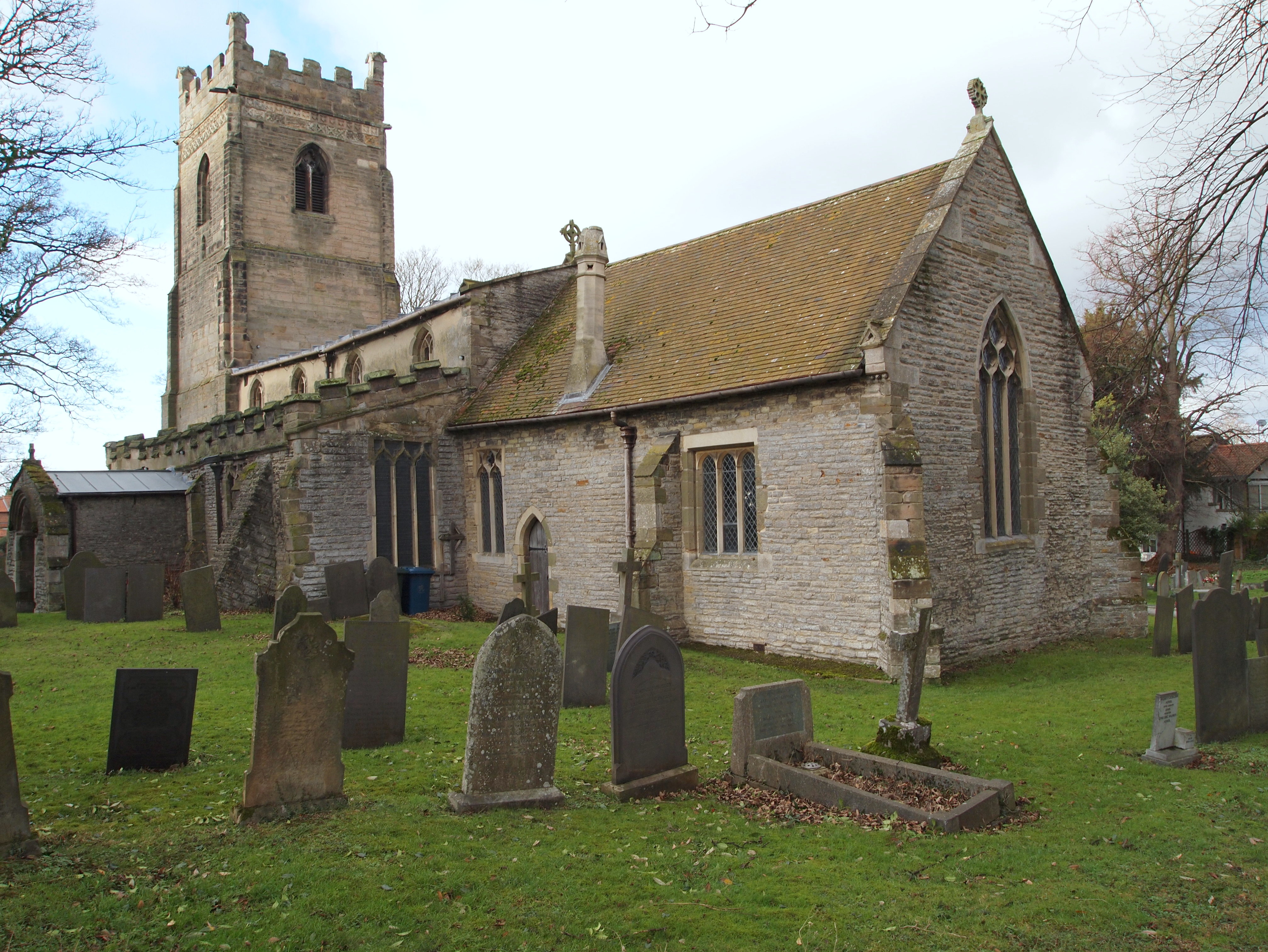
- St Giles' Church, Cropwell Bishop
- Denomination: Church of England
- Churchmanship: Broad Church
- Website: www.wivertoninthevale.co.uk/saint-giles-cropwell-bishop/

History
- Dedication: St Giles

Administration
- Province: York
- Diocese: Southwell and Nottingham
- Parish: Cropwell Bishop

Clergy
- Rector: Vacant

St Giles' Church, Cropwell Bishop, is a Church of England parish church in the village of Cropwell Bishop, Nottinghamshire, England. The building is Grade I listed by the Department for Digital, Culture, Media and Sport as of outstanding architectural interest.

== History ==
The church has 13th-century arcades, but it is mainly from the 14th century. It has a nave, north and south aisles, a south porch, a chancel and a tower. The tower, built about 1450, now contains six bells. One is from the 16th century, two are dated 1669 and 1757, a fourth was recast in 1905, and a fifth was added in the same year. A sixth, the treble bell, was installed in 1981.

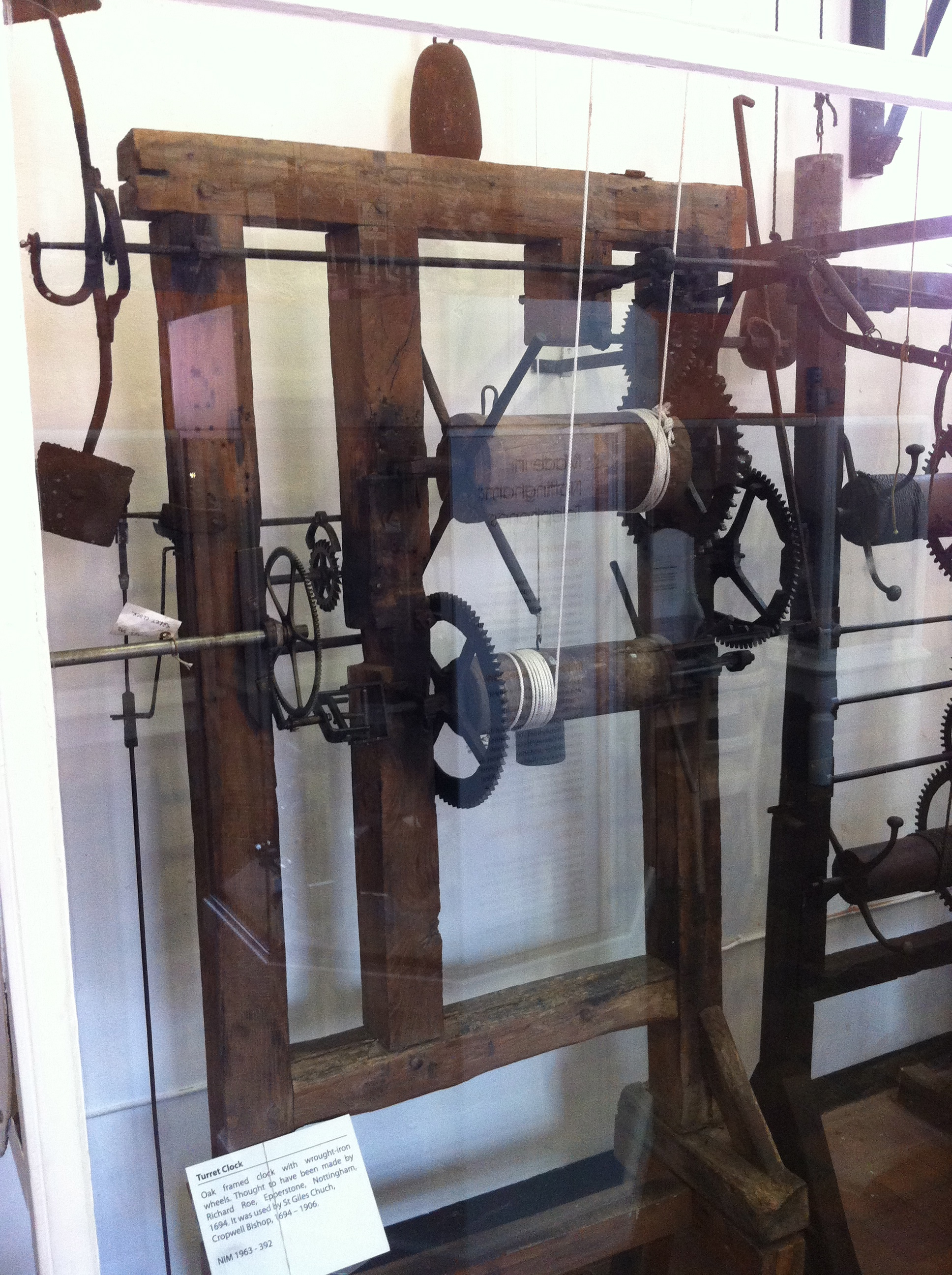
Former turret clock now in Nottingham Industrial Museum

From 1694 to 1906, the church had a clock by Richard Roe. This is now preserved in Nottingham Industrial Museum.

== Current parish status ==
St Giles' Church, Cropwell Bishop, is in the Wiverton group of parishes, which includes:

- St Andrew's Church, Langar
- All Saints' Church, Granby
- Holy Trinity Church, Tythby
- St John's Church, Colston Bassett
- St Mary's Church, Barnstone (not currently in use)
- St Michael and All Angels' Church, Elton on the Hill

The incumbency is currently vacant.

== See also ==
- Grade I listed buildings in Nottinghamshire
- Listed buildings in Cropwell Bishop

== Source ==
- Clare Hartwell, Nikolaus Pevsner and Elizabeth Williamson: The Buildings of England, Nottinghamshire, Yale University Press, 2020
