= Philadelphia Scrope =

English aristocrat and courtier (1563–1628)

Philadelphia, Lady Scrope (née Carey; c.1563 (Note: Kristin Bundensen gives her birth year as 1563, but does not cite a source. Other suggestions have included c.1552.) – 3 February 1628) was an English aristocrat and courtier.

== Family ==
Philadelphia Carey was a daughter of Henry Carey, 1st Baron Hunsdon and Anne Morgan. Her brother, Robert Carey, was the governor of Prince Charles from 1605 to 1610.

In 1584, she married Thomas Scrope, 10th Baron Scrope of Bolton, later a Knight of the Order of the Garter. They had one child, Emanuel Scrope, 1st Earl of Sunderland.

== Life as a courtier ==
In November 1593, a page of Lady Scrope, who was lady of the bedchamber, died in the keep at Windsor Castle and Queen Elizabeth considered moving her household for fear of sickness.

Philadelphia was a friend of the Earl of Essex. In August 1600, she wrote to him that Elizabeth had read one of his letters carefully in her presence. She asked the Queen if he would be returned to favour but received no answer.

Lady Scrope took part in the Harefield Entertainment in August 1602, and was given a mask or vizard, as the lines "Want you a mask! Here fortune give you one: Yet nature gives the rose and lily none" were recited.

She was at the queen's bedside near the time of her death. She is mentioned in Elizabeth Southwell's narrative of the queen's final days, as her special confidante. On the queen's death, she passed her sapphire ring to her brother Robert Carey, who rode to Scotland to give it to James VI. One version of the story of the ring is that James VI had sent the sapphire ring to Philadelphia Scrope by his diplomat Sir James Fullerton to be used as a token of Elizabeth's death.

On 2 May 1603, Lady Scrope and Anne, Countess of Worcester, Frances, Countess of Kildare, Lady Anne Herbert, Penelope, Lady Rich, Audrey Walsingham and others went to Berwick-upon-Tweed to welcome Anne of Denmark to England, according to the directions of the Privy Council. Anne came to Berwick on the 9 May. Some of the women had travelled into Scotland to meet her ahead of the others. Another group of women, led by Lucy, Countess of Bedford also travelled to Scotland, attempting to gain the new queen's favour.

A letter of Philadelphia Scrope mentions that she had escorted Anne of Denmark from Warwick, according to directions from Sir Robert Cecil, but unlike her companions, she had no reward.

== Death and burial ==
Thomas Scrope died on 2 September 1609. Lady Scrope died on 3 February 1628. (Note: Scrope's date of death is given on her monumental inscription in St Andrew's Church, Langar as "the 3 of February 1627": this is almost certainly an Old Style date, corresponding to 3 February 1628 New Style. A letter from James Howell to the Countess of Sunderland (wife of Emanuel Scrope, 1st Earl of Sunderland, Philadelphia's son), written shortly after Philadelphia's burial and purportedly dated 1 July 1629, has been cited to suggest that she died in that year, but may have been misdated: it bore no date when first published in 1645, and was first dated in 1650.) She apparently died and was buried at Hunsdon, Hertfordshire; but the couple are jointly commemorated by a large monument at St Andrew's Church, Langar, Nottinghamshire, which includes recumbent effigies of both, and a smaller kneeling figure of their son, Emanuel.
