= St Michael and All Angels' Church, Elton on the Hill =

Nottinghamshire Anglican church

Coordinates: 52°56′27″N 00°51′35″W

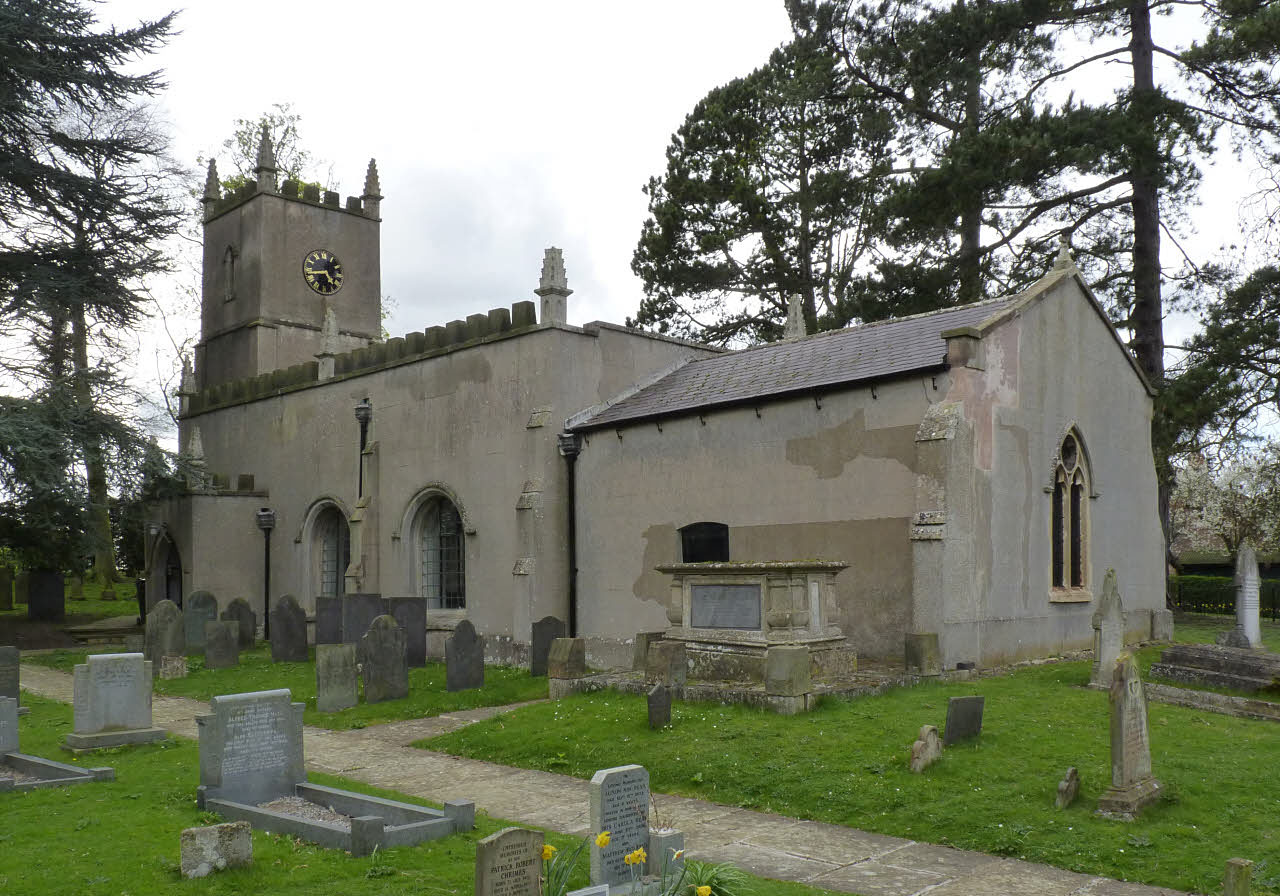
- St Michael and All Angels' Church, Elton on the Hill
- Denomination: Church of England
- Churchmanship: Broad Church
- Website: www.wivertoninthevale.co.uk/saint-michael-elton

History
- Dedication: St Michael and All Angels

Administration
- Province: York
- Diocese: Southwell and Nottingham
- Parish: Elton on the Hill

Clergy
- Rector: Vacant

St Michael and All Angels' Church, Elton on the Hill is a parish church in the Church of England in Elton on the Hill, Nottinghamshire. It is Grade II listed by the Department for Digital, Culture, Media and Sport as a building of special architectural interest.

== The building ==
The church is medieval but was heavily restored between 1855 and 1857 and given a stucco rendering in imitation of ashlar. The church had been described somewhat cryptically as "dove house topped", but obtained its present brick tower at the time of the church's restoration. It contains two bells, and a modern clock installed in 1969, in memory of William Noël and Hilda Grace Parr, formerly of the Old Rectory, who both died in 1967. Remains of medieval stonework can be seen inside on the south side of the nave, including the arches which originally divided it from a south aisle that was demolished. The chancel is narrower. The wooden altar rails are Jacobean.

The stained glass in the window at the east end of the church shows St Paul preaching to the Athenians (Acts 17:24) with an inscription: "WHOM THEREFORE YE IGNORANTLY WORSHIP HIM I DECLARE VNTO YVO / IN LOVING MEMORY OF ROBERT WEATHERELL RECTOR OF ELTON FROM 1863 TO 1883". (The need to turn "ignorant worship" into "spiritual worship" was a central theme of the Evangelical movement in the 19th century.)

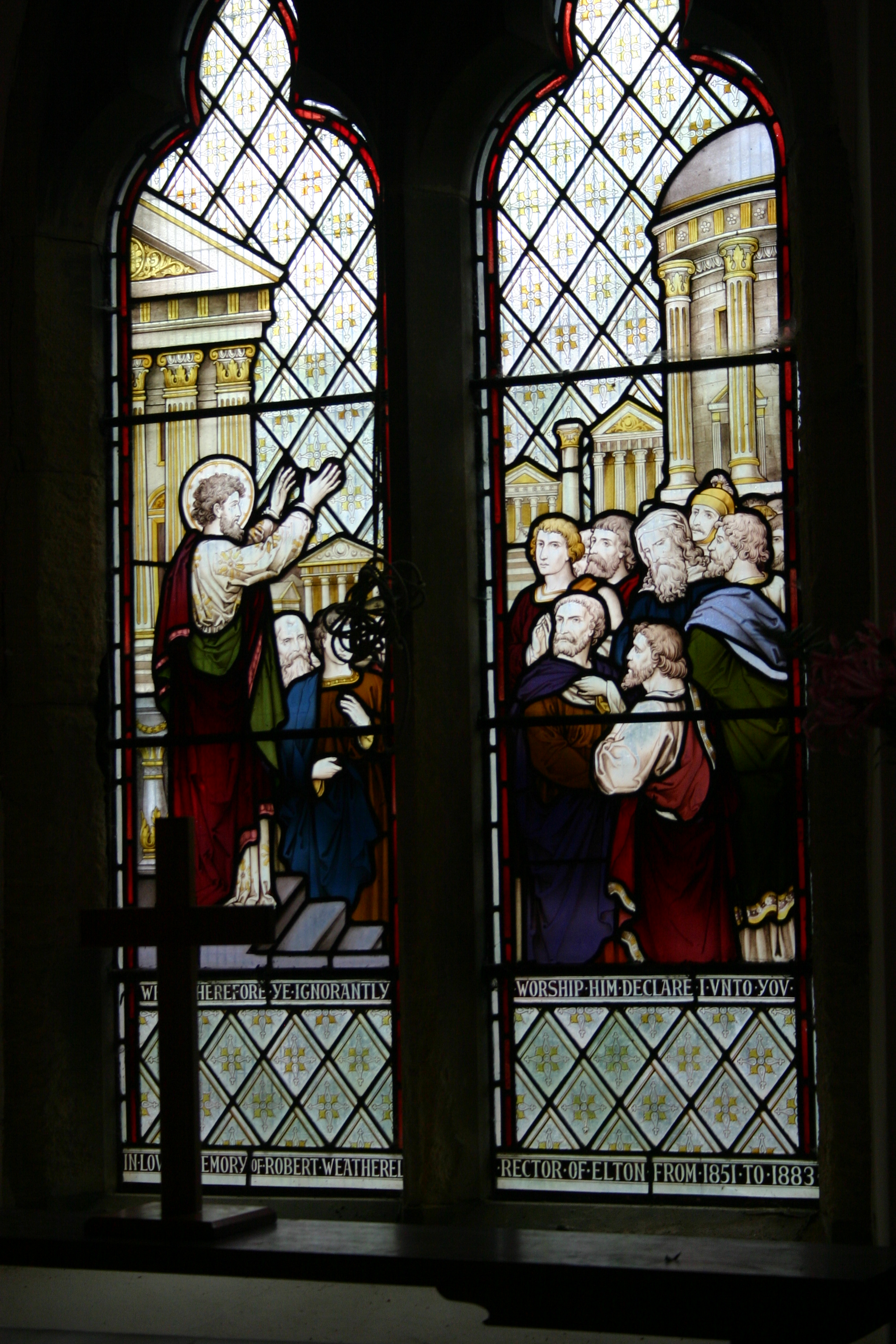
The stained glass window behind the altar of Elton Church

There are arched panels over the chancel door bearing the words of the Ten Commandments and of the Lord's Prayer. These may antedate the restoration.

The modern oak pews were a gift in the 1950s from W. G. Player of Whatton Manor, who is buried in the south-east corner of the churchyard. The oak panels were donated by W. Noël Parr.

There are other tablets in the church to Frances Launder, W. F. N. Norton, Ursula Norton, Sarah Norton (1788–1867) and Langford Collin (1700–1766), all of Elton Manor; also to Amy, wife of R. F. Pinder (died 1922) of Elton Rectory (although Pinder is not on the list of rectors), and to Charles Gordon Mackie (died 2005) and his wife Margaret (Peggy) Georgina (died 2004) of Elton Old Rectory.

There are many interesting gravestones in the churchyard, including the Launder tomb, which has received a Grade II heritage listing. Others are described on the Elton on the Hill page.

== Parish status ==
The rectory of Elton was held jointly with the vicarage of Granby from 1917, when Cecil Richard Storr, already vicar of Granby, became rector. The advowson of Elton was presented to the Bishop of Southwell by W. N. Parr when he left the village in 1957. It is part of the diocese of Southwell and Nottingham.

On the retirement of Rev. J. Pickworth-Hutchinson, Elton parish was invited by the Bishop to join the Wiverton group of parishes, which comprised:

- St Michael and All Angels' Church, Elton on the Hill
- St Andrew's Church, Langar
- St Giles's Church, Cropwell Bishop
- All Saints' Church, Granby
- Holy Trinity Church, Tythby
- St John's Church, Colston Bassett
- St Mary's Church, Barnstone (not in use for many years and sold in 2020)

From March 2017 the individual parishes formed a new parish of Wiverton in the Vale.

The rector of the parish and vicar of the group was Rev. Colin Perkins initially, then Rev. Andrew Wigram from 1995, Rev. Bronwen Gamble from 2006 (from 2017 of the new parish of Wiverton in the Vale), and from 2019 the Rev. Rachel Mitchell who lives with her family in Cropwell Bishop.

== See also ==
- Listed buildings in Elton on the Hill
