= Elton on the Hill =

Hamlet and civil parish in Nottinghamshire, England

Coordinates: 52.941°N 0.860°W

Elton on the Hill: Elton
- Hamlet and civil parish
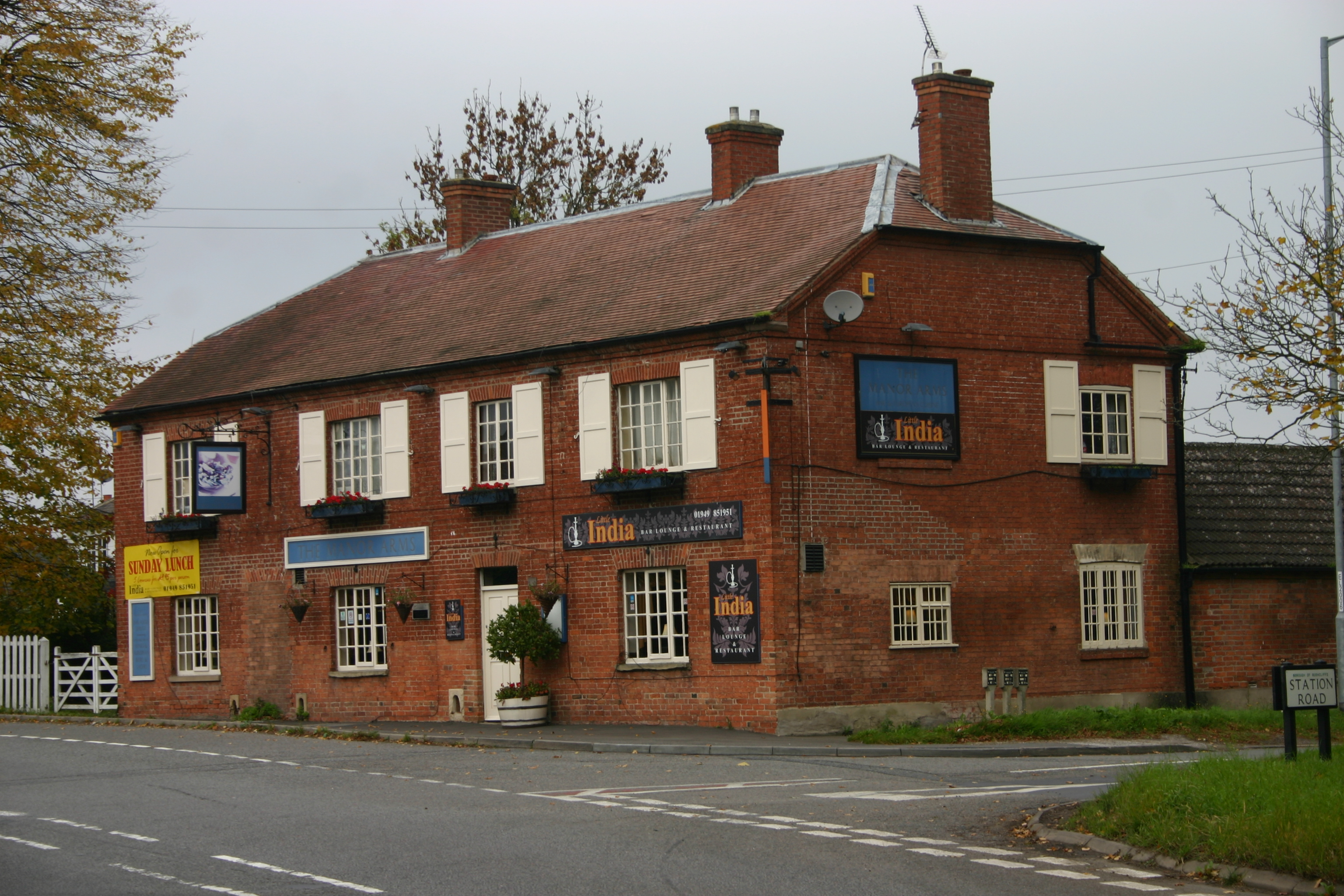
- The Manor Arms, Elton

- Location within Nottinghamshire
- Interactive map of Elton on the Hill
- Area: 1.61 sq mi (4.2 km^{2})
- Population: 114
  - Density: 71/sq mi (27/km^{2})
- OS grid reference: SK 767388
  - London: 105 mi (169 km) SSE
- Civil parish: Elton-on-the-Hill
- District: Rushcliffe
- Shire county: Nottinghamshire
- Region: East Midlands
- Country: England
- Sovereign state: United Kingdom
- Post town: NOTTINGHAM
- Postcode district: NG13
- Dialling code: 01949
- Police: Nottinghamshire
- Fire: Nottinghamshire
- Ambulance: East Midlands
- UK Parliament: Newark

Elton on the Hill is a hamlet and civil parish in the Rushcliffe district, in Nottinghamshire, England and within the Vale of Belvoir. A population of 114 was reported at the 2021 census.

== Location and facilities ==
Elton lies about 14 miles (23 km) east of Nottingham. It straddles the A52 trunk road, from which Station Road runs north towards Orston and Sutton Lane south, with Sutton-cum-Granby being the nearest hamlet in that direction. Elton has a population of 114 people and is in the Rushcliffe district. It has an area of 1,037 acres (4.20 km^{2}) and an altitude of 22–37 metres (72–121 feet) above sea level. Since 2010 the village has been part of Newark parliamentary constituency (instead of Rushcliffe). The member since June 2014 has been the Conservative Robert Jenrick.

The village pub/restaurant (Elton Cuisine, once a pub called the Manor Arms) was sold and converted into residential accommodation in 2020. There is bed-and-breakfast accommodation at The Grange, an early 19th-century farmhouse with parts dating back to 1725, owned and run by the ex-Scotland FA footballer Don Masson and his wife. Elton Camp, near the station, has been used by the Girl Guides for 80 years. There is commercially owned coarse fishing on a 28-acre (11 ha) site off Redmile Lane, which also has a five-berth caravan site. The fish ponds are fed by Moor Dyke, the one stream to flow through Elton. The Vale of Belvoir Inn and Hotel (originally a private house called Whatton Vale, later a guest house called The Haven) stands on the boundary of Elton and Whatton-in-the-Vale, at the junction of the A52 with Redmile Lane.

The nearest station is Elton and Orston, but this offers a service of only one train in each direction on Monday to Saturday, including bank holidays. The stationmaster's lodge and ticket office (1855, architect Thomas Chambers Hine) were demolished in the 1970s. There are regular trains to Nottingham, Grantham and Skegness from Aslockton, 2.5 miles (4.0 km) away. The village is served by a local hourly bus between Bingham and Orston.

Elton has never had a school, although a handful of pupils were taught privately at a house near the station in the 1960s. Children usually attend the primary school in Orston and secondaries in Bingham, Bottesford or Nottingham.

== Buildings ==
The fabric of the small Anglican church of St. Michael and All Angels is partly medieval but heavily restored with stucco rendering in 1857, when the tower was rebuilt. Previously, the village was a joint parish with Granby, but in March 2017, it joined with five others in a parish group called Wiverton in the Vale. It is in the dioceses of Southwell and Nottingham. Since 2019 the rector has been Rev. Rachel Mitchell.

The church and several churchyard tombstones are Grade II listed. They include, just south of the chancel, a table tomb to Margaret Launder, wife of A. Collin Launder, who died on 22 December 1780. The Latin epitaph reads, "Were it right for me to indulge in private grief, as a husband I should be justified in weeping for you, who have been taken away. Yet spare your tears, nor let anxiety distract you. No one who has lived well dies wretchedly. The honour commonly accorded to you is less than your deserts. So, my wife, you have gone where goodness will be regarded as real honour. O one dear to me, farewell; yet I hope the time will come when I shall be with you again, if by any means I shall be worthy." About ten yards away is a group of late 18th-century slate gravestones, including one to Thomas Mann – no relation to the novelist. Two smaller slate gravestones, also listed, are dated 1703 and 1720. One is a "Belvoir angel", a type of stone in Swithland slate typical of the Vale. The earliest monument to a lord of the manor is to Langford Collin (1700 – 2 August 1766), who also owned estates at Beeston and Chilwell. There is a modern gravestone just to the west of the church recording the death of one Harry Potter.

There used to be a large, plain, early 19th-century parapeted manor house, with extensive grounds. This was demolished in 1933 by its last owner, W. Noël Parr, a Nottingham solicitor who lived in the Old Rectory until 1957. The adjuncts that remain are an 18th-century gateway into Sutton Lane, with a lodge (19th century, extended in the 1950s, once the sub-post office), the red brick walls of kitchen gardens with a fort-like Grade II listed gazebo, thought to date from the late 18th or early 19th century, and a grey brick brew house, now inhabited and enlarged. On the main road towards Bottesford is a small ashlar, Grade II listed gamekeeper's lodge in Tudor style, built in 1842 but likewise enlarged. The name "Elton Manor" was purloined in the 2010s for a new family house opposite the site.

The extensive Old Rectory on Station Road dates from the early 19th century and has some historicist features.

== Names ==
Until recently, "Elton-on-the-Hill" (hyphenated) was the name of the church parish and "Elton" of the contiguous civil parish. However, Capper's A Topographical Dictionary of the United Kingdom... (London, 1825) lists "Elton-super-montem, a parish in Bingham hund[red]. Notts." The name in Saxon times was "Aylton", but it was referred to as "Olleton" in a deed by which Roger de Bussi, Busli or Builli and his wife Muriel transferred the manor and advowson to "God and the Church of St. Mary of Blyth and the monks there serving God." The name appeared as "Elleton" in an Inquisition (survey) taken in 1283. Buildings belonging to Elton Manor and the Rectory were whitewashed with black paintwork in the early 20th century, as are a couple to this day, so that Elton was nicknamed the "Magpie Village".

== Earlier history ==
Elton ("Ayletone") in the 1086 Domesday Book had 14 households (11 villeins and 3 free) and a church. The lord in 1066 had been Earl Morcar, whose lands lay mainly in Lincolnshire and Yorkshire. The lord at the time of Domesday was Ralph of Neufmarché and the tenant-in-chief Roger of Bully, who is mentioned in connection with 381 other places as lord or tenant-in-chief, mainly in Nottinghamshire and Yorkshire. They include Bingham and East Bridgford and other nearby places.

The feudal dues paid in the Middle Ages to Blyth in money and kind were high and appear to have stunted growth of the village. Then came successive sales leading to increased rents and fines. Having belonged from Domesday to the Dissolution to the Priory of Blyth, it "came into the possession of someone by the name of York, who sold it to Sir John Lion, Citizen and Alderman of London, who left it to his nephew, who sold it to a man named More, whose stepson in [the Nottinghamshire historian] Thoroton's time 'obtained the utmost profit the Lordship was any way able to yield him by the means of the extremest rack rents now paid.'" The farmland of Elton and most nearby villages was still farmed by the open field system in 1790. Some fields today are ridged, but it is unclear whether the ridges follow the lines of medieval strips or formed part of a later system of drainage. Even before the enclosures, the village and church were described as small, and an account of the tithes paid records that apart from the rectory and the "Manor, or Hall-Farm" there were only eight farms and twelve cottages, "so that it seems there is not much above Half so many Farmers as in old Time."

Rev. William Selby, inducted in 1686, was a dissolute Rector. Bingham court records of 25 October 1709 report that "John Trinbury, in justification of his assault upon the Rector of Elton complained that at the funeral of Ellen Ragsdale 3 or 4 years earlier, the said Rector was so drunk that he could not say the usual prayers for the dead but fell asleep at the reading desk and had to be disturbed by the Parish Clerk, and then he went to the grave with the corpse and bid them put her in saying 'God help thee poor Nell' without any other prayers or ceremony and afterwards was led home by the Clerk. On the following day the Rector answered in a similar sworn statement that he was abused by the said John Trinbury in a very scandalous manner being called a knave, a rascal and a 'paultry scrub' and having his clothes pulled off his back by the said John and his wife and daughter." The Rector had been charged in December 1708 for blasphemy for having uttered the question, "Was God Almighty a drone? If not what was he doing before he made the Earth?"

Turning to a later, slimmer account of Elton's history: "In the Saxon times it was called Ayleton, and was afterwards of the fee of Roger de Busli, who gave it to the Priory of Blyth. At the dissolution of the monasteries it was granted to the family of York, from whom it passed to the Lions, Mores, Collins and Launders, and is now possessed by William Fletcher Norton Norton Esq., who resides in the manor house, a large and handsome mansion. [He] is patron of the rectory, which is valued in the King's books at £8 0s 5d, now £286, and is enjoyed by the Rev. Robert Weatherell. The church, dedicated to St Michael, is a small humble edifice, which Thoresby describes as being 'dove house topped'. The parish was enclosed in 1808, when land was allotted in lieu of all tithes. The feast is on Sunday after old Michaelmas Day [10 or 11 October]....

"In 1780, the parish clerk found, whilst digging a grave in the churchyard, upwards of 200 silver pennies, of the reign of Henry II and, on taking them to Mrs Collin, then lady of the manor, His honesty was rewarded with a present of £10. In 1784, a blacksmith in Elton purchased a rusty piece of iron, about 2 feet long and 1½ inches in diameter, apparently solid, and which had been used as a pestal [sic] upwards of 60 years. Having some doubts about its solidity, he put it into his fire, when it exploded with great force, and a musket ball from within it grazed his side, and lodged in some coals behind him. This surprising accident led to further examination and enquiry, when it was discovered to have been a gun barrel, dug up in the year 1723, but so completely filled with earth and rust that no cavity had ever till then been noticed."

The village had 81 inhabitants in 1848, and 91 in 1851.

== Apples and peers ==
According to Notes and Queries (4 February 1870, Vol. 41), William Fletcher Norton Norton of Elton Manor acknowledged he was the illegitimate son of "a former Lord Grantley," presumably the second (1742–1822). He married, first, Ursula Launder, daughter and co-heiress of Cornelius Launder of Elton Manor, in 1807, and secondly Sarah Lushington, previously Mrs William Carmac, in 1847. Other sources say that Ursula and her sister Frances were cousins of Cornelius Launder (c. 1720–1806), the previous lord of the manor, who had founded in about 1800 a charity for the benefit of clergy with livings near Nottingham.

Among many interests, Norton was a director of the Nottingham Canal Company, which owned the Grantham Canal, and chairman of the Nottinghamshire and Derbyshire Fire & Life Assurance Company and of the Ambergate, Nottingham, Boston and Eastern Junction Railway, which opened the Nottingham–Grantham line through Elton in 1850. His gardens gained renown when the Baron Ward cooking apple "was raised, from Dumelow's Seedling, in 1850, by Mr. Samuel Bradley, at Elton Manor, Nottingham, and first exhibited at the British Pomological Society, May 5th, 1859." The variety is still commercially available. While at Elton, Bradley was also responsible for two strawberry varieties: Sir Joseph Paxton (1862) and Dr. Hogg (1866). Norton died in 1865, leaving the estate to a nephew. Bradley died at Halam, Nottinghamshire in 1891.

Black's Guide to Nottinghamshire, 1876, states, "The Hall, a spacious modern mansion, is now the occasional seat of Count De Pully, who inherited the estate from the late William Fletcher Norton Norton, Esq. The villagers have a tradition, that during the civil wars of the seventeenth century a battle was fought in the fields near Elton, and in confirmation of this report, several weapons and human remains have been found. In 1780, a large number of silver coins, principally of the reign of Henry II., were discovered in the churchyard."

De Pully, according to The Nobilities of Europe, 1910, by Melville H. Ruvigny, was "William Enguerrand DE PULLY, of Elton, co. Notts, b. 1823, eldest son of the Count de Pully of Belabre, France, by Mary, sister of William Fletcher Norton of Elton, [who] suc[ceeded] his uncle in that estate 1866, and was naturalized in the United Kingdom as 'Enguerrand, Compte de Pully,' 14 May 1867. He sold Elton in 19-- to Lord Grantley."

According to a list of large estates sold by auction in 1900–1901, Elton Manor estate covered 1075 acres and fetched £27,000. The purchaser would have been Grantley, who as lord of the manor presented the living of Elton to Rev. E. Nelson in 1907. Grantley never lived at Elton Manor and is said to have failed to recognise it when he saw it from the train. He had almost certainly sold it before the Great War, probably before 1913, when he bought the estate of Red Rice, Hampshire. The next owner was Walter Black (born 1850, son of Thomas Black of Beeston, Nottinghamshire and his wife Anne, née Cooper, and possibly connected with a Nottingham printing firm) and his wife Eunice, née Stubley, who presented the living to C. R. Storr in 1917. Their successor at the manor was Lt. Col. Sir Henry Dennis Readett-Bayley (1878–1940), whose parents had lived at Langar Hall and left him a mining fortune. He was knighted in 1918 for his war work of providing ambulances, through the million-pound Dennis Bayley Fund for the Transport of the Wounded. Readett-Bayley was the lord of the manor, probably from 1921, who appointed Rev. W. H. Jenkins in 1927, but he soon sold on to W. N. Parr. (See above under Buildings.) Parr in 1941 presented the living to Rev. Gerald Marson, who arrived from the mining parish of Greasley. Marson had visited the Holy Land and often described Biblical places graphically in his sermons. He, his wife and his predecessor are all buried on the east side of the churchyard.

Many of the old parish registers of Elton on the Hill are available online.

== Guide campsite ==
Elton Girl Guide camp stands on 11 acres (4.5 ha) of ground donated to the movement in 1930. It lies just across the railway, closer to Orston but in Elton parish. The facility includes five equipped camping areas and a holiday house, set amid grass and woodland.

== See also ==
- Listed buildings in Elton on the Hill

== Gallery ==
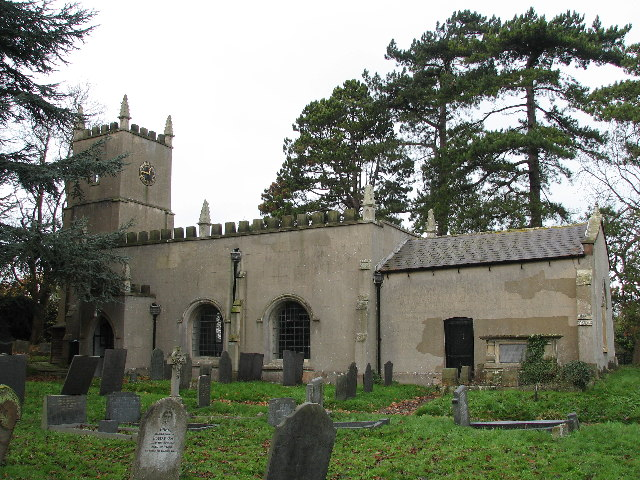
Elton Church seen from the south

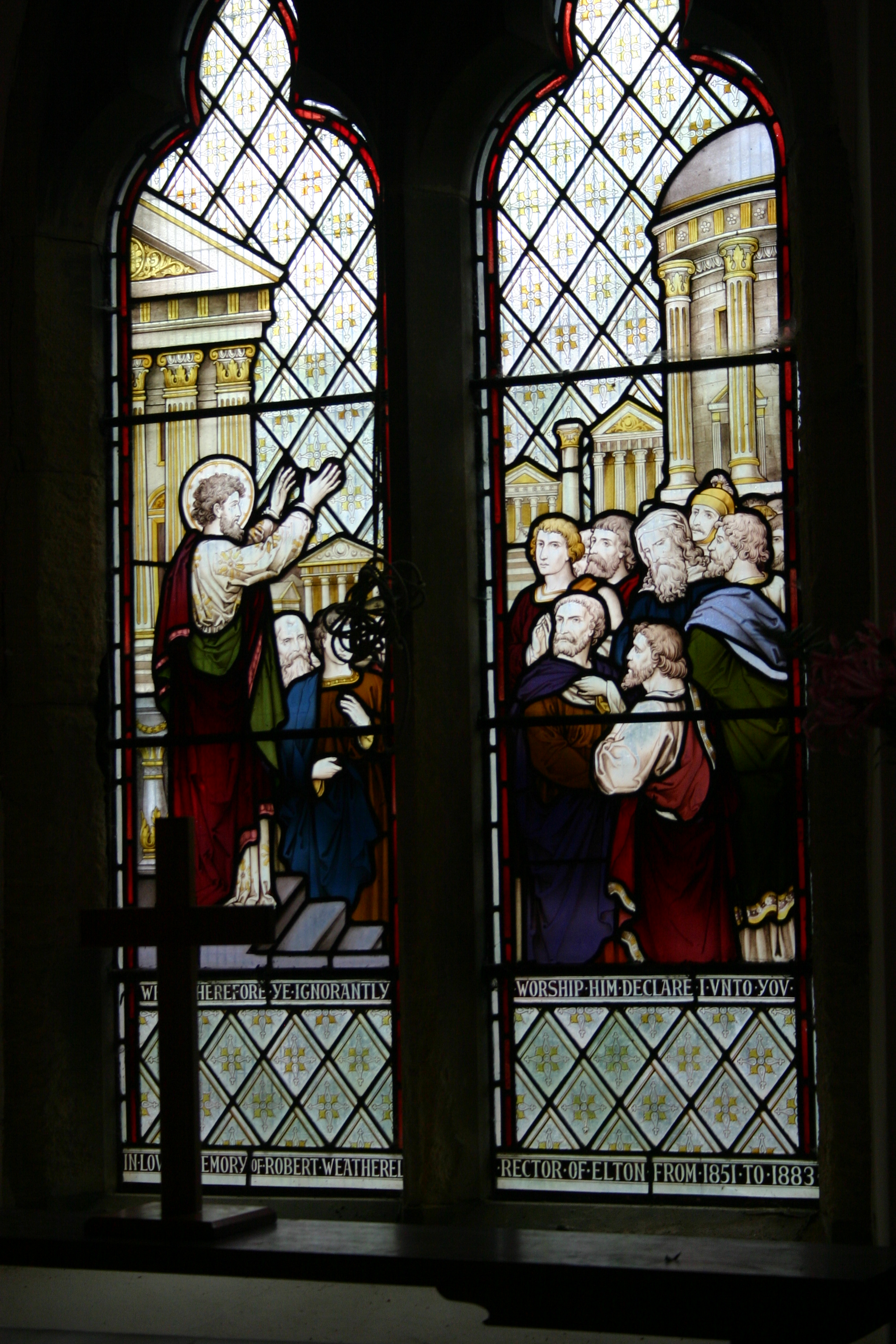
Elton church, the stained-glass window behind the altar

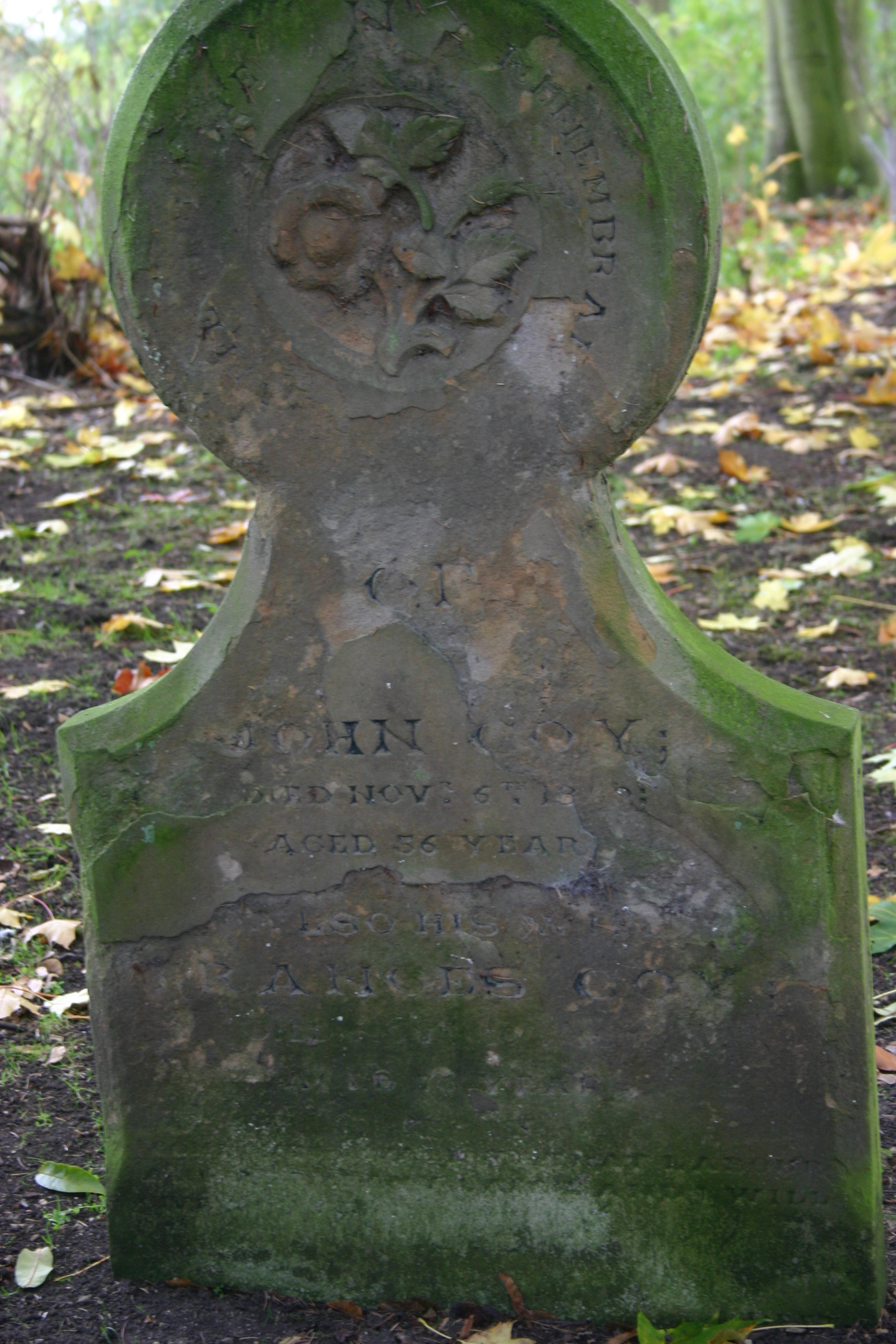
An Elton gravestone

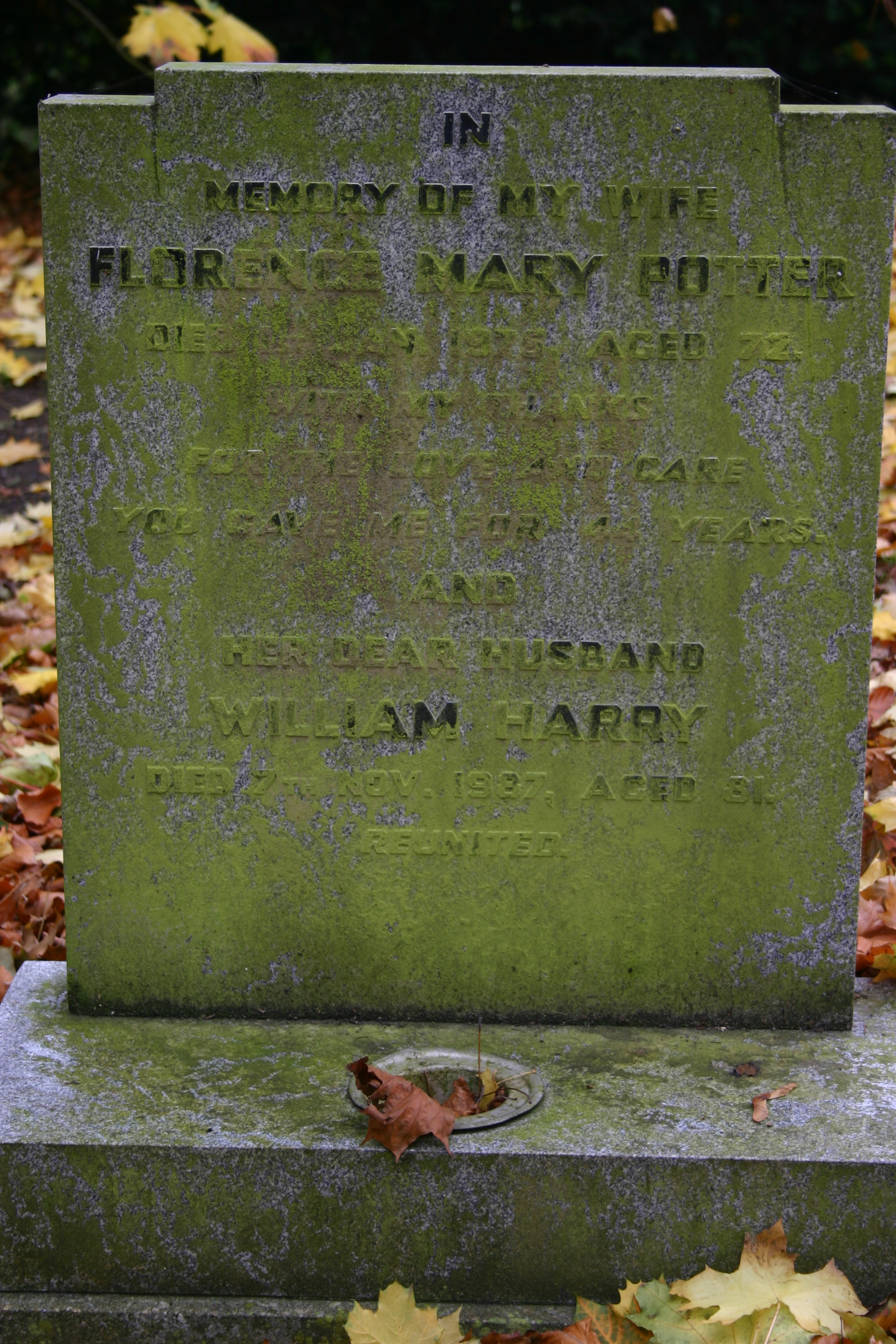
The grave of Florence Mary Potter and her husband William Harry in Elton churchyard
