= Barnstone railway station =

Former railway station in Nottinghamshire, England

Coordinates: 52.91534°N 0.90226°W

Barnstone
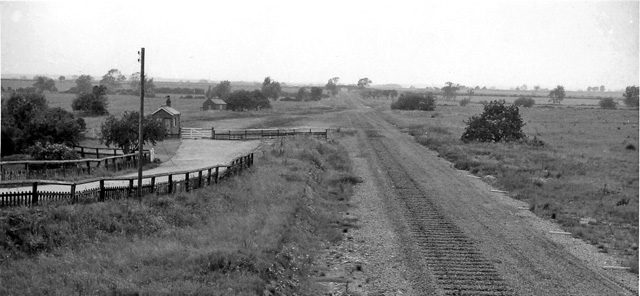
- Barnstone railway station in 1963

General information
- Location: Barnstone, Nottinghamshire; England

Other information
- Status: Disused

History
- Original company: Great Northern and London and North Western Joint Railway
- Pre-grouping: Great Northern and London and North Western Joint Railway
- Post-grouping: London and North Western Railway and London, Midland and Scottish Railway joint

Key dates
- 1 September 1879: Opened as Barnstone
- 1889: Renamed Barnston
- 1 August 1897: Renamed Barnstone
- 7 December 1953: Closed
Location

Barnstone railway station was a railway station serving the villages of Barnstone, Granby and Langar, Nottinghamshire, on the Great Northern and London and North Western Joint Railway. It opened in 1879 and closed to regular traffic in 1953.

Former Services

Preceding station	Disused railways	Following station
Harby and Stathern	London and North Western Railway; Northampton to Nottingham	Bingham Road
