= Geoffrey Huskinson (cartoonist) =

English cricketer and cartoonist (1935–2018)

Personal information
- Full name: Geoffrey Mark Clement Huskinson
- Born: 25 September 1935; Langar, Nottinghamshire, England
- Died: 8 March 2018 (aged 82); Menorca, Spain
- Batting: Right-handed
- Bowling: Leg break
- Relatives: Geoffrey Huskinson (father)

Career statistics
| Competition | First-class |
|---|---|
| Matches | 1 |
| Runs scored | 10 |
| Batting average | 5.00 |
| 100s/50s | –/– |
| Top score | 7 |
| Catches/stumpings | –/– |
- Source: Cricinfo, 15 February 2019

Geoffrey Mark Clement Huskinson (25 September 1935 – 8 March 2018) was an English cartoonist and first-class cricketer. His cartoons found prominence from the mid-1970s, featuring in many exhibits, books and newspapers.

== Life and career ==
The eldest of four children, Huskinson was born at Langar Hall to the first-class cricketer Geoffrey Huskinson, Sr. and his wife, Carmen Imogen de las Casas, who was the daughter of a Spanish nobleman from Cuba. He began to lose his hearing aged ten, shortly before attending Ampleforth College. It was his deteriorating hearing that sparked his interest in drawing. Unable to concentrate in class, he began doodling on his desk. After leaving Ampleforth, he was offered places at Slade School of Fine Art and the Ruskin School of Drawing and Fine Art, but accepted a place at Edinburgh College of Art.

His time there was brief, with Huskinson moving to New Zealand where he worked on a sheep station until 1955. He returned to England, where he bought a farm in Lincolnshire. Huskinson played a first-class cricket match for the Free Foresters against Oxford University at Oxford in 1959. He had little success in what was his only foray into first-class cricket, scoring 3 runs in the Free Foresters first-innings before being dismissed by David Russell, while in their second-innings he was dismissed by David Sayer for 7 runs. He married Judith Chadfield in 1961, with the couple having three sons. During this period he worked for Aveling-Barford as their representative in Africa and the Middle East, before leaving in 1967 when the company was taken over by British Leyland.

He took up art once more in the mid-1970s, initially specialising in portraiture and sculpting. He later exhibited some cartoons he had drawn, and decided to focus as a cartoonist after they sold out within 30 minutes. He exhibited across the world between 1980 and 2007, and was regularly selling over 3,000 prints a year. His illustrations filled a number of books, most prominently those about horse racing and cookery. His wife died in 2007, with Huskinson briefly marrying Sue Ward, who ran his dealing network. In 2014, he moved to Menorca to live by the golf course at Son Parc, where he died in March 2018.

== Family ==
His great-grandfather was Thomas Bayley, the Member of Parliament for Chesterfield. His sister, Imogen Skirving, was killed in a road accident in 2016 when she came to visit Huskinson in Menorca.
