= All Saints' Church, Granby =

Nottinghamshire Anglican church

Coordinates: 52°53′03″N 00°53′03″W

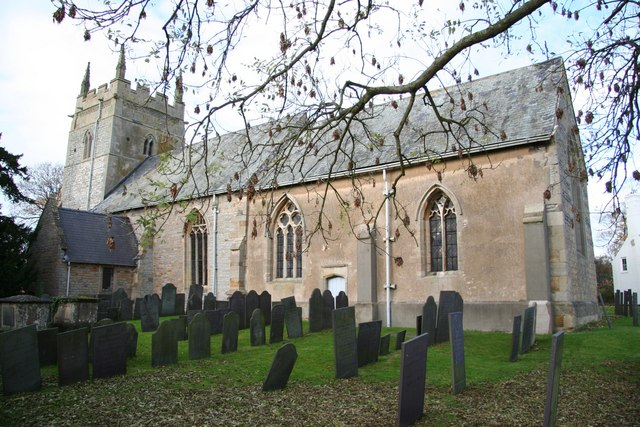
- All Saints' Church, Granby
- Denomination: Church of England
- Churchmanship: Broad Church
- Website: www.wivertoninthevale.co.uk/all-saints-granby/

History
- Dedication: All Saints

Administration
- Province: York
- Diocese: Southwell and Nottingham
- Parish: Granby, Nottinghamshire

Clergy
- Rector: Vacant

All Saints', Granby is a Church of England parish church in Granby, Nottinghamshire, England. The building is Grade I listed by the Department for Digital, Culture, Media and Sport for outstanding architectural or historic interest.

== History ==
The church is medieval (with fragments dating from the 12th century), but it was reduced in size and the tower repaired about 1777. The chancel originally had a terracotta east window, which was replaced by one of stone during restoration work in 1888. Fragments of the original, including two incomplete heads, lie in the chancel. Within a 1958 south porch is a heavily moulded, 13th-century doorway in Early English style.

== Parish status ==
All Saints' Church, Granby is in the Wiverton group of parishes, which includes:

- St Andrew's Church, Langar
- St Giles's Church, Cropwell Bishop
- Holy Trinity Church, Tythby
- St John's Church, Colston Bassett
- St Mary's Church, Barnstone (not currently in use)
- St Michael and All Angels' Church, Elton on the Hill

Services are held in Granby about once a month. The post of priest in charge is vacant at present.

== See also ==
- Grade I listed buildings in Nottinghamshire
- Listed buildings in Granby, Nottinghamshire

== External sources ==
- A detailed history of the church and its parish: Retrieved 5 January 2016.
