= Listed buildings in Tithby =

Tithby is a civil parish in the Rushcliffe district of Nottinghamshire, England. The parish contains six listed buildings that are recorded in the National Heritage List for England. Of these, one is listed at Grade I, the highest of the three grades, and the others are at Grade II, the lowest grade. The parish contains the village of Tithby and the surrounding area. All the listed buildings are in the village, and consist of a church, headstones and tombs in the churchyard, the churchyard wall, a former vicarage, and a telephone kiosk.

== Key ==
Grade	Criteria
I	Buildings of exceptional interest, sometimes considered to be internationally important
II	Buildings of national importance and special interest

== Buildings ==
Name and location	Photograph	Date	Notes	Grade
Holy Trinity Church; 52.92542°N 0.96260°W		14th century	The church has been altered and extended through the centuries. Most of it is built in stone, with brick in the upper part of the tower and the upper part of the porch. The roofs are in lead, apart from the north aisle and the tower, which are slated. The church consists of a nave, a north aisle, a lean-to south aisle with a porch, a chancel, and a west tower. The tower has a west window with a cambered head, a lancet window and a pyramidal roof. Inside the church is Georgian furniture, including box pews, and a west gallery.	I
Group of 13 headstones, Holy Trinity Church; 52.92533°N 0.96235°W		1723	The headstones in the churchyard are in slate, some are rectangular and some are shaped. They contain differing inscriptions and carved designs, and the dates extend from 1723 to 1815.	II
The Old Vicarage; 52.92522°N 0.96316°W		Early 18th century	A brick house on a plinth, with a floor band, and a pantile roof with chamfered brick verges. There is a single storey and an attic, a front of three bays, and a rear wing. In the centre is a gabled porch, flanked by casement windows, and in the attic are three gabled dormers.	II
Two chest tombs and a headstone, Holy Trinity Church; 52.92537°N 0.96248°W		1728	The headstone in the churchyard is in slate, it has ornamental lettering and is dated 1728. The chest tombs are in gritstone, and have square fluted corner strips, flat tops and raised oval panels. They are dated from 1744 to 1808.	II
Churchyard wall, Holy Trinity Church; 52.92555°N 0.96265°W	—	18th century (probable)	The wall encloses the churchyard on all four sides. It is in blue lias with flag coping, and up to 2 metres (6 ft 7 in) high. There are gateways in the east side and the southwest corner.	II
Telephone kiosk 52.92566°N 0.96247°W		1935	The K6 type telephone kiosk in Main Street was designed by Giles Gilbert Scott. Constructed in cast iron with a square plan and a dome, it has three unperforated crowns in the top panels.	II
