= Thomas Scrope, 10th Baron Scrope of Bolton =

The Right Honourable The Lord Scrope of Bolton KG
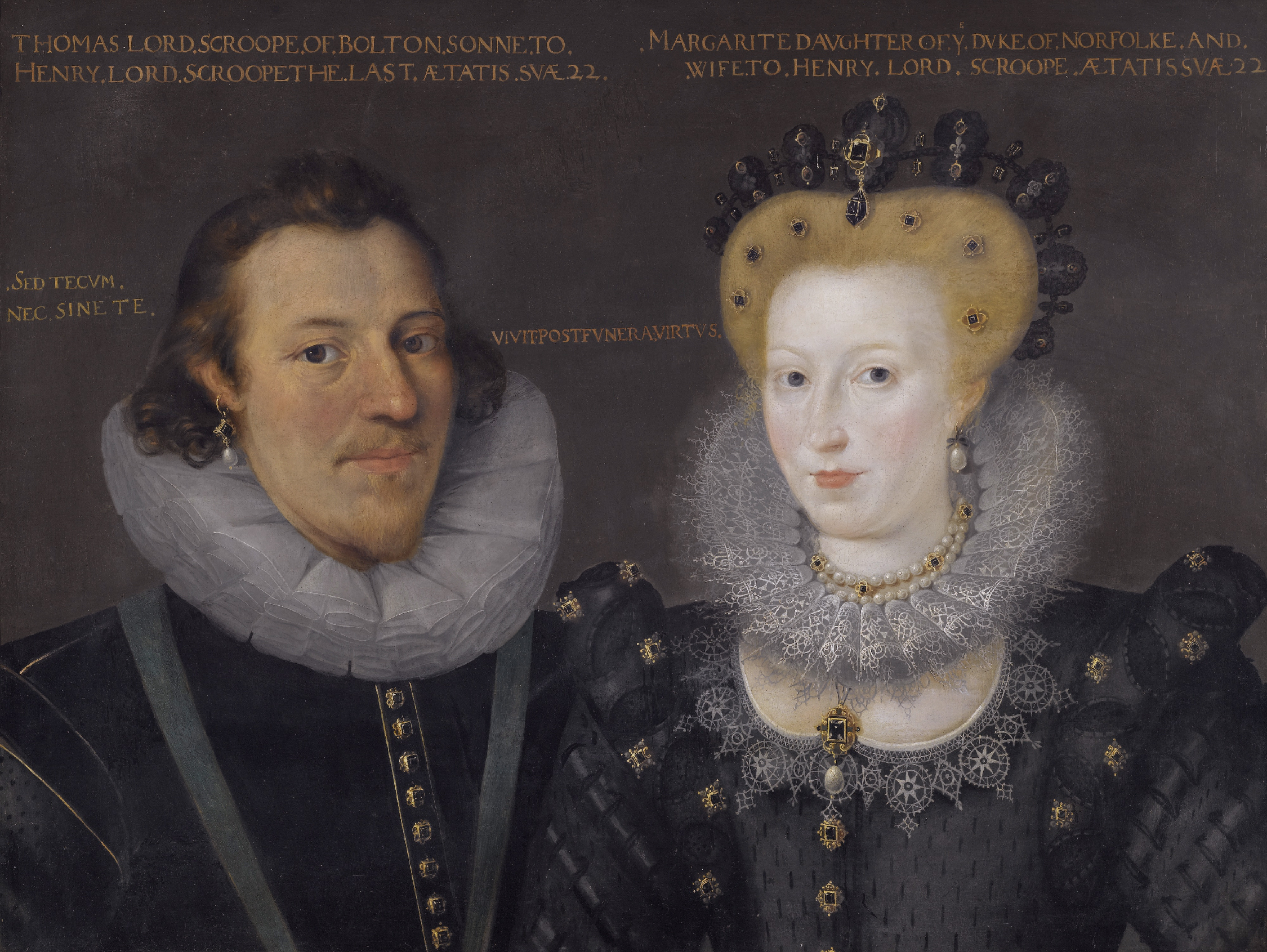
- Lord Scrope with his mother, Margaret Howard
- Born: 1567
- Died: 2 September 1609 (aged 41–42); Langar, Nottinghamshire, England
- Occupations: knight of the shire (MP) for Cumberland (1584–1586, 1588–1593); Warden of the English West March (1593–1603)
- Notable work: arrested the outlaw Kinmont Willie Armstrong
- Spouses: Philadelphia Carey (m. 1584)
- Children: 1 son
- Parents: Henry Scrope, 9th Baron Scrope of Bolton (father); Margaret Howard (mother)

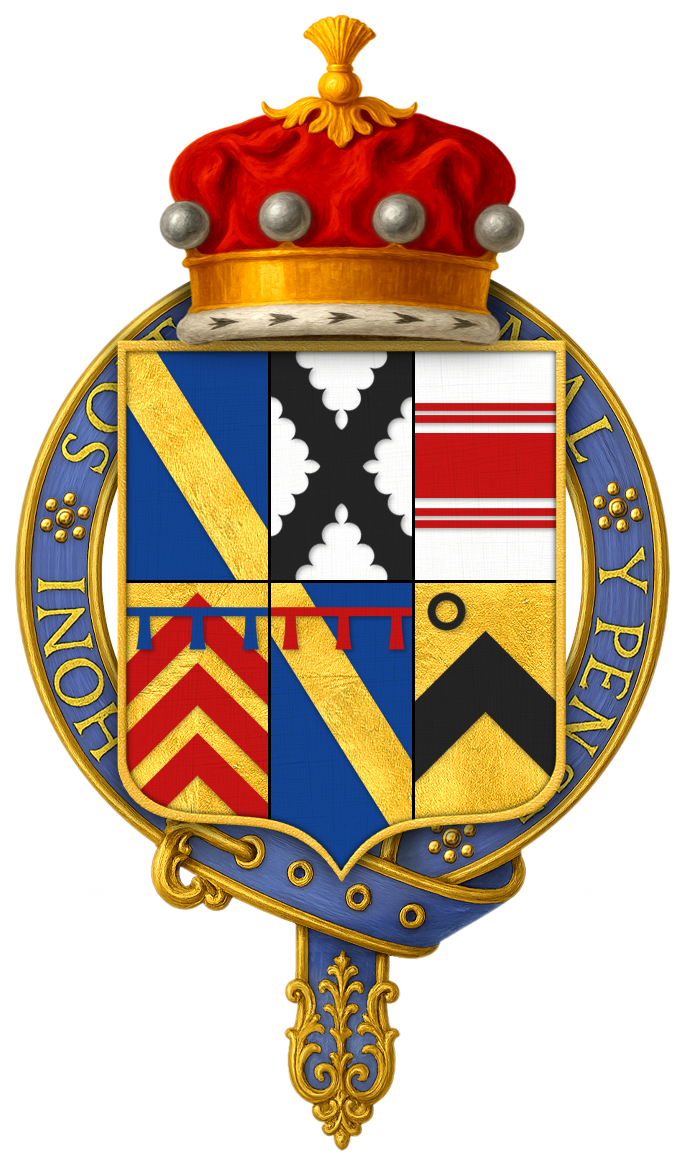
Quartered arms of Sir Thomas Scrope, 10th Baron Scrope of Bolton, KG

Thomas Scrope, 10th Baron Scrope of Bolton, KG (1567 – 2 September 1609) was the son of Henry Scrope, 9th Baron Scrope of Bolton and Margaret Howard, daughter of Henry Howard, Earl of Surrey and Frances de Vere.

== Biography ==
He was knight of the shire (MP) for Cumberland from 1584 to 1586 and from 1588 to 1593.

He held the office of Warden of the English West March from 1593 until the Union of the Crowns of England and Scotland in 1603. He was made a Knight of the Garter in 1599.

While Scrope was Warden, the outlaw Kinmont Willie Armstrong was arrested (in violation of a truce day) and imprisoned at Carlisle Castle. Scrope had only recently been appointed to the post of Warden, and he was unsure of what to do with an outlaw who had been illegally arrested. On 13 April 1596, as a result of a raid orchestrated by Walter Scott, 1st Lord Scott of Buccleuch, Kinmont Willie was freed. In a failed attempt to recapture Kinmont Willie, Scrope "burnt the towns of Annan and Dumfries to the ground, capturing two hundred prisoners whom he marched home 'naked, chained together on leashes'". This caused a major diplomatic incident. Scrope derived a significant part of his income from coal mining at Preston in Wensleydale.

== Marriage ==
In 1584, he had married Philadelphia Carey, daughter of Henry Carey, 1st Baron Hunsdon and Ann Morgan. They had one child Emanuel Scrope, 1st Earl of Sunderland.

In August 1593, a page of Lady Scrope, who was lady of the bedchamber, died in the keep at Windsor Castle and Queen Elizabeth considered moving her household for fear of sickness. She took part in the Harefield Entertainment in August 1602. She was at the queen's bedside near the time of her death.

In June 1603, Lady Scrope and Penelope, Lady Rich, Audrey Walsingham and others went to Berwick-upon-Tweed to welcome Anne of Denmark to England in June 1603, according to the directions of the Privy Council.

== Death ==
He died at the village of Langar, Nottinghamshire, in 1609. In the village church at Langar is to be found a magnificent memorial to him. The tomb is adorned with an effigy of himself, his wife and their son Emmanuel.

== Notes ==
Peerage of England
Preceded by Henry Scrope	Baron Scrope of Bolton; 1592–1609	Succeeded by Emanuel Scrope
