= Listed buildings in Cropwell Bishop =

Cropwell Bishop is a civil parish in the Rushcliffe district of Nottinghamshire, England. The parish contains twelve listed buildings that are recorded in the National Heritage List for England. Of these, one is listed at Grade I, the highest of the three grades, and the others are at Grade II, the lowest grade. The parish contains the village of Cropwell Bishop and the surrounding area. All the listed buildings are in the village, and consist of a church, the churchyard wall and headstones in the churchyard, houses and cottages, a public house and a chapel.

== Key ==
Grade	Criteria
I	Buildings of exceptional interest, sometimes considered to be internationally important
II	Buildings of national importance and special interest

== Buildings ==
Name and location	Photograph	Date	Notes	Grade
St Giles' Church; 52.91278°N 0.98318°W		13th century	The church has been extended and altered through the centuries, and the chancel was restored in 1854. The church is in stone, the chancel roof is tiled, and the other roofs are leaded. It consists of a nave with a clerestory, north and south aisles, a south porch, a chancel, and a west tower. The tower is in Perpendicular style, with three stages, buttresses, a three-light west window, two-light bell openings, a double decorative frieze, and an embattled parapet with corner pinnacles.	I
The Cottage; 52.91243°N 0.98193°W		17th century	The cottage is timber framed with plater infill, and the end walls are in brick. It has a pantile roof with coped gables on square kneelers. There are two storeys and two bays. The windows are casements, those in the upper floor continuing above the eaves as dormers.	II
12 and 14 Nottingham Road; 52.91275°N 0.98688°W		Late 17th or early 18th century	A row of cottages with a timber framed core, encased in painted brick, and later used for other purposes, they have a pantile roof with brick coped gables, crow-stepped on the right, with kneelers. Thee is a single storey and attics, five bays, and a later rear wing. On the front are two doorways, three tripartite casement windows, a partly blocked dovecote, and a pair of dormers.	II
Wheatsheaf Inn; 52.91261°N 0.98470°W		Early 18th century	The public house is in painted brick, and has a tile roof with brick coped gables and square kneelers. There are two storeys and attics, a front range of four bays, and a later rear wing. The doorway has a segmental head, most of the windows are tripartite casement windows, there are small stair windows, and a two-light attic window.	II
16 and 20 Fern Road; 52.91245°N 0.98281°W		Mid 18th century	A pair of brick cottages that have a pantile roof with brick coped gables and square kneelers. There is a single storey and attics. The windows are casements, and there is a pair of dormers.	II
47 Nottingham Road; 52.91239°N 0.98719°W	—	18th century	A cottage in painted brick with a dentilled eaves cornice, and a pantile roof with a brick coped gable on the left. There are two storeys and three bays. The windows are casements, those in the ground floor tripartite with segmental heads.	II
Headstones (east); 52.91275°N 0.98283°W	—	18th century	The headstones are in the churchyard of St Giles' Church, to the east of the chancel. The seven headstones are in slate, with dates between 1740 and 1818.	II
Headstones (north); 52.91293°N 0.98300°W	—	18th century	The headstones are in the churchyard of St Giles' Church, to the north of the chancel. The seven headstones are in slate, with dates between 1772 and 1808.	II
Headstones (south); 52.91265°N 0.98297°W	—	18th century	The headstones are in the churchyard of St Giles' Church, to the south of the church. The 32 headstones are mostly in slate, with dates between 1735 and 1806.	II
Headstones (west); 52.91283°N 0.98363°W	—	18th century	The headstones are in the churchyard of St Giles' Church, to the west of the tower. The eleven headstones are in slate, with dates between 1746 and 1813.	II
Churchyard wall 52.91271°N 0.98375°W	—	1838	The wall enclosing the churchyard of St Giles' Church on the south and west sides is in blue lias with coping in sandstone flags. It is 2 metres (6 ft 7 in) high and extends for about 50 metres (160 ft). The wall contains a pair of gate piers on the south side, and in the centre is an inscribed and dated plaque.	II
Wesleyan Chapel; 52.91215°N 0.98592°W		1842	The chapel is in brick with pale headers, and has a tile roof. There is a single storey with two bays at the front and sides, and a small vestry at the rear. The front is pedimented and contains a round-arched doorway with a fanlight flanked by round-arched sash windows. In the pediment is an inscribed and dated plaque.	II
