= Listed buildings in Elton on the Hill =

Elton on the Hill is a civil parish in the Rushcliffe district of Nottinghamshire, England. The parish contains nine listed buildings that are recorded in the National Heritage List for England. All the listed buildings are designated at Grade II, the lowest of the three grades, which is applied to "buildings of national importance and special interest". The parish contains the village of Elton on the Hill and the surrounding area. The listed buildings consist of a church, headstones and a tomb in the churchyard, three buildings associated with the demolished Elton Hall, a farmhouse and a barn.

== Buildings ==
Name and location	Photograph	Date	Notes
St Michael and All Angels' Church; 52.94116°N 0.85964°W		12th century	The church has been altered and extended through the centuries, especially in 1855–57 when it was substantially restored. It is rendered and has a slate roof. The church consists of a nave, a south porch, a lower chancel, and a west tower. The tower has three stages, clasping buttresses, bands, and an embattled parapet with corner pinnacles. It contains a west window of paired lancets, lancet bell openings, and a clock face on the east side. The porch, which is square, and the nave, have embattled parapets with pinnacles, and on the south side of the nave are two round-arched windows with hood moulds.
Two headstones 52.94116°N 0.85936°W		1703	The headstones are in the churchyard of St Michael and All Angels' Church to the southeast of the chancel, and are in slate. The headstone dated 1703 is to the memorial of John Chamberling, and is tapering with an angled top and a moulded edge. The other, dated 1728, commemorates Francis Boot and his wife, it is rectangular, and has an inscription and the depiction of a round-faced winged angel.
Group of headstones 52.94111°N 0.85958°W		1766	The headstones are in the churchyard of St Michael and All Angels' Church to the south of the nave. They are in slate, and have various shapes, decorations and inscriptions. The dates range between 1766 and 1812.
Gateway, Elton Manor; 52.94130°N 0.85911°W		Late 18th century	The gateway to the house, which was demolished in 1933, is flanked by rusticated limestone piers. On the sides of each pier is a pilaster strip surmounted by a scroll, on the top is a moulded pyramidal cap, and between them are heavy iron gates. Outside these are brick quadrant walls with end piers, on a blue tile plinth, and with limestone coping.
Ridge Farmhouse; 52.94161°N 0.86007°W	—	Late 18th century	The farmhouse is in brick, with a dentilled eaves cornice, and a tile roof with brick gable copings. There are two storeys and attics, a symmetrical front of three bays, and later additions on the right. The doorway is in the centre and the windows are casements.
Barn, Ridge Farm; 52.94190°N 0.86055°W	—	Late 18th century	The barn is in brick, and has a pantile roof with brick gable copings. The roof sweeps over an off-centre cart entrance, there are slit vents, and on the left is a lower addition.
Launder Tomb; 52.94115°N 0.85945°W		1780	The tomb is in the churchyard of St Michael and All Angels' Church to the south of the chancel, and it commemorates members of the Launder family. It is a rectangular stone chest tomb with a moulded plinth and cap. There are two inscribed panels, one in slate on the front, and one in sandstone on the rear, and on the ends are plain marble plaques.
Gazebo; 52.94024°N 0.86044°W	—	Late 18th or early 19th century	The gazebo is set in the garden wall of the former Elton Hall, and is in brick with a limestone band, copings and finials. There is a large round-arched entrance portal with an impost band and a keystone. At the rear are corner buttresses, and on the top is an embattled parapet with corner ball and stalk finials.
Chipsholm; 52.94127°N 0.85288°W		1842	A lodge of the former Elton Hall, later a private house, it is in stone in Tudor style, and has a slate roof and gables with bargeboards. There are two storeys, an entrance front of two bays, and three bays on the left return, the right bay projecting and gabled. On the front is a gabled porch with a pointed arch and a hood mould, and to its left is a two-light window with a hood mould, above which is an elaborate coat of arms.
