= Imogen Skirving =

British hotelier

Joan Imogen Muriel Skirving JP (née Huskinson, c. 1937 – 1 July 2016) was a British hotelier and restaurateur, who turned her family home Langar Hall into an award-winning country house hotel.

== Biography ==
Skirving was born as Joan Imogen Muriel Huskinson in 1937 in Marylebone, London, England. She was the daughter of Geoffrey Huskinson, a "pre-war captain of Nottinghamshire County Cricket Club," and his wife, Carmen Imogen de las Casas, who was the daughter of a Spanish nobleman from Cuba. She had three siblings, including cartoonist Geoffrey Huskinson.

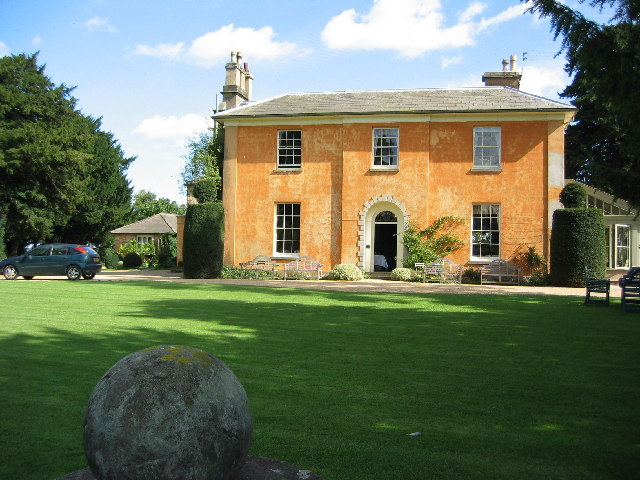
Langar Hall, Nottinghamshire

Skirving's great-grandmother bought Langar Hall, outside Nottingham, Nottinghamshire, in 1860. Skirving inherited the family home, where her father used to entertain famous cricketers of the 1930's, after his death in 1968. She turned the residence into an award-winning boutique country house hotel. Guests at Langar Hall included Keira Knightley, Barbara Cartland, Henry Blofeld, and the Archbishop of Canterbury. The former Labour Party leader Ed Miliband married Justine Thornton there in 2011.

Skirving served as chair of the Nottinghamshire Building Preservation Trust in 1976.

Skirving died on 1 July 2016, when she was hit by a car whilst on holiday in Menorca, Spain.
