= Listed buildings in Granby, Nottinghamshire =

Granby is a civil parish in the Rushcliffe district of Nottinghamshire, England. The parish contains 13 listed buildings that are recorded in the National Heritage List for England. Of these, one is listed at Grade I, the highest of the three grades, and the others are at Grade II, the lowest grade. The parish contains the villages of Granby and Sutton, and the surrounding countryside. The listed buildings consist of a church, gravestones in the churchyard, farmhouses, a village pump, a war memorial and a telephone kiosk.

== Key ==
Grade	Criteria
I	Buildings of exceptional interest, sometimes considered to be internationally important
II	Buildings of national importance and special interest

== Buildings ==
Name and location	Photograph	Date	Notes	Grade
All Saints' Church; 52.91809°N 0.88450°W		12th century	The church has been altered and extended through the centuries, alterations were made in 1777, and it was restored in 1888. It is built in stone, partly rendered, and has a slate roof. The church consists of a nave, north and south porches, a chancel and a west tower. The tower has four stages, clasping buttresses, a west lancet window, two small round-headed Norman windows, two-light bell openings, and at the top is a frieze with an ornamental band, and an embattled parapet with gargoyles and corner pinnacles. In the south porch is a doorway with a moulded surround.	I
Headstones south of the nave 52.91796°N 0.88452°W		1710	The 35 headstones are in the churchyard of All Saints' Church to the south of the nave. Most of them are in slate, with some in limestone, and they have different shapes and with various inscriptions. The headstones are dated between 1710 and 1811, and commemorate members of various families.	II
Headstones south of the chancel 52.91795°N 0.88432°W		1719	The 19 headstones are in the churchyard of All Saints' Church to the south of the chancel. They are in slate, in different shapes and with various inscriptions. The headstones are dated between 1719 and 1800, and commemorate members of various families.	II
Headstones by the tower 52.91801°N 0.88476°W		1724	The five headstones are in the churchyard of All Saints' Church adjacent to the west end of the tower. They are in slate, in different shapes and with various inscriptions. The headstones are dated between 1724 and 1801, and commemorate members of the Morley, Parnham and Riley families.	II
Headstones south of the tower 52.91801°N 0.88468°W		1724	The twelve headstones are in the churchyard of All Saints' Church adjacent to the south of the tower and west of the south porch. They are in slate, in different shapes and with various inscriptions. The headstones are dated between 1724 and 1806, and commemorate members of various families.	II
Tapering grave slab 52.91793°N 0.88460°W	—	Mid 18th century	The grave slab is in the churchyard of All Saints' Church south of the nave. It is in limestone, and consists of an eroded tapering slab, raised in the centre, resembling a coffin lid, and carved in relief with a cherub's head.	II
Granby Farmhouse; 52.91790°N 0.88599°W		1762	The farmhouse is in brick, with a floor band, a dentilled eaves cornice and a pantile roof. There are two storeys and attics, three bays, and a low rear extension. The doorway has a fanlight and a small hood, and the windows are sashes, those in the ground floor with segmental heads, and those in the upper floor are horizontally-sliding. In the right gable is an initialled datestone.	II
Manor Farmhouse; 52.91774°N 0.88440°W	—	Late 18th century	The farmhouse is in brick with a floor band and a hipped pantile roof. There are two storeys, a symmetrical front of three bays, and a later rear extension with a gabled slate roof. In the centre is a doorway with a moulded surround and a fanlight. The windows are casements, and all the openings have segmental heads.	II
Highfield Farmhouse; 52.93061°N 0.86798°W	—	Early 19th century	The farmhouse is rendered, and has a hipped slate roof. There are three storeys, a symmetrical front of three bays, and a single-storey extension on the right. In the centre is a full height recessed panel containing the doorway and a window above. The doorway has a round-arched head and a fanlight, and the windows are casements, those in the lower two floors with segmental heads.	II
Lodge Farmhouse; 52.91827°N 0.88553°W		Early 19th century	A small brick house with a sawtooth eaves cornice and a pantile roof. There are two storeys, and a symmetrical front of three bays. In the centre is a doorway with a lattice porch, and the windows are sashes, those in the ground floor with cambered heads, and the window above the doorway is blind.	II
Village pump 52.92926°N 0.86932°W		19th century	The village pump on Sutton Green is in cast iron with a handle, and is surrounded by a wooden fence.	II
War memorial 52.91818°N 0.88483°W		c. 1920	The war memorial is in the churchyard of All Saints' Church, and is in white limestone. It consists of an incised wheel-head cross on a tapering chamfered shaft. This stands on a square plinth, on a base of two steps. On the west face of the plinth is a metal plaque with an inscription relating to the First World War.	II
Telephone kiosk 52.91790°N 0.88497°W		1935	The K6 type telephone kiosk to the southwest of All Saints' Church was designed by Giles Gilbert Scott. Constructed in cast iron with a square plan and a dome, it has three unperforated crowns in the top panels.	II
