= Holy Trinity Church, Tythby =

Church in Nottinghamshire, England

Coordinates: 52°55′31″N 00°57′47″W

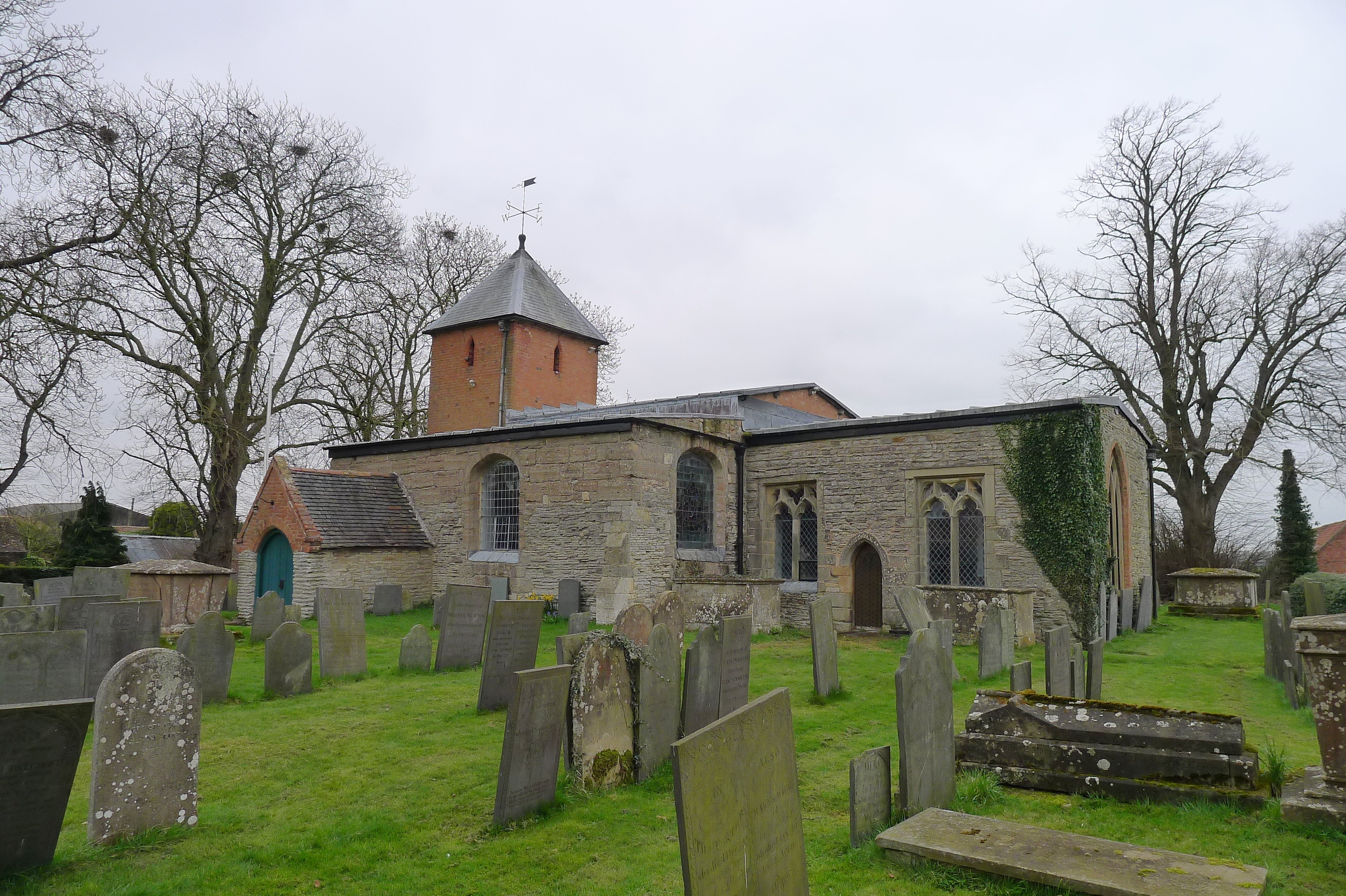
- Holy Trinity Church
- Holy Trinity Church, Tythby
- Denomination: Church of England
- Churchmanship: Broad Church
- Website: www.wivertoninthevale.co.uk/holy-trinity-tythby/

History
- Dedication: Holy Trinity

Administration
- Province: York
- Diocese: Southwell and Nottingham
- Parish: Tithby

Clergy
- Rector: Vacant

Holy Trinity Church, Tythby is a parish church in the Church of England in the English village of Tithby, Nottinghamshire. The building is Grade I listed.

== History ==
Holy Trinity is a medieval church built in the 13th century in Early English style and rebuilt in the 18th century. It has a later bell tower in brick. The Georgian furnishings including a pulpit with reader's desk, box pews, squire's pew and west gallery. The bells and font are dated 1662. It has two east-facing stained-glass windows. On the gallery on the west side is a 19th-century organ.

== Current parish status ==
Holy Trinity Church, Tythby is in the Wiverton group of parishes, which includes:

- St Andrew's Church, Langar
- St Giles's Church, Cropwell Bishop
- All Saints' Church, Granby
- St John's Church, Colston Bassett
- St Mary's Church, Barnstone
- St Michael and All Angels' Church, Elton on the Hill

== See also ==
- Grade I listed buildings in Nottinghamshire
- Listed buildings in Tithby
