= St Mary's Church, Barnstone =

Coordinates: 52°54′47″N 00°54′23″W

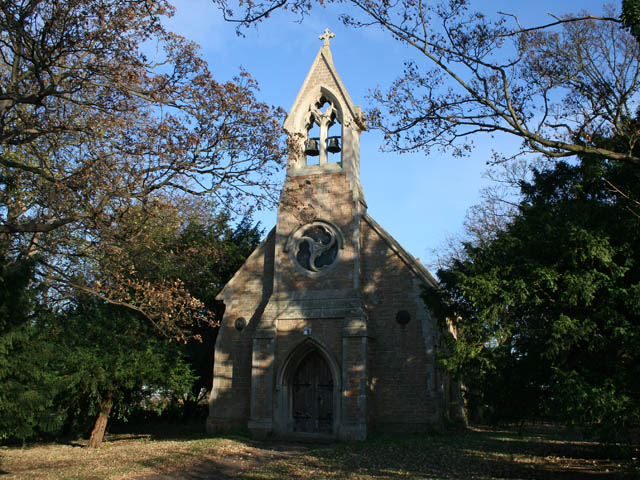
- St Mary's Church, Barnstone
- Denomination: Church of England
- Churchmanship: Broad Church
- Website: www.wivertoninthevale.co.uk/saint-mary-barnstone/

History
- Dedication: St. Mary

Administration
- Province: York
- Diocese: Southwell and Nottingham
- Parish: Barnstone

Clergy
- Rector: Vacant

St Mary's Church, Barnstone is a parish church in the Diocese of Southwell and Nottingham of the Church of England, situated in Barnstone, Nottinghamshire. It was completed as a chapel of ease for St Andrew's Church, Langar in 1857 in Gothic Revival style.

== The building ==
The inscription above the entrance describes the chapel as being "rebuilt" in that year by T. D. Hall. This is confirmed by Kelly's Directory of Nottinghamshire, 1904: "The chapel of ease is a small building of stone in the Gothic style, consisting of chancel and nave, with a turret containing 2 bells; it was rebuilt by the late Thomas Dickinson Hall Esq. of Whatton Manor, in 1855, and has 100 sittings." (The year 1855 was probably the year construction started and 1857 the date of completion. Hall had been High Sheriff of Nottinghamshire in 1843.) The cost of construction was £1,200.

The church indeed consists of a nave and a chancel. The turret at the east end contains two bells. There are memorials inside to the fallen in two world wars, and small amounts of Victorian stained glass: the east window with five roundels, and the upper lights of the three pairs of windows in the nave. The pews, lectern, pulpit and communion rail are made of oak. There are 15 small coats of arms hanging on the walls, one brought from the earlier chapel.

Light on the earlier chapel is shed by White's History, Gazetteer and Directory of Nottinghamshire, 1832:

"The chapel is a small building, with a short tower, and is annexed to the rectory of Langar. This we suppose is the remains, or rather, perhaps, the successor of the ancient chapel of St. Atheburga, (Note: The dedication was either to St Æthelburh of Barking or possibly to the earlier St Æthelburh of Kent.) or St, Aubrey, which Thoroton says stood in the fields of Langar, and was considered as partly belonging to Granby church, with which it was given to Thurgarton priory. The feast here is on the Sunday after Whit-Sunday."

== Secular use ==
The church was closed in 2017. In October 2019, plans were submitted to Rushcliffe Borough Council to convert the church into a five-bedroom home.

== Parish status ==
St Mary's Church, Barnstone is not currently in use. It belongs to the Wiverton group of parishes, which includes:

- St Andrew's Church, Langar
- St Giles's Church, Cropwell Bishop
- All Saints' Church, Granby
- Holy Trinity Church, Tythby
- St John's Church, Colston Bassett
- St Michael and All Angels' Church, Elton on the Hill
