= Justine Thornton =

British barrister and judge (born 1970)

The Honourable Justice Thornton DBE
- Thornton in 2026

High Court Judge King's Bench Division
- Incumbent
- Assumed office 28 February 2019

Personal details
- Born: 25 September 1970 (age 56) Manchester, England
- Spouse: Ed Miliband (m. 2011)
- Children: 2
- Education: Robinson College, Cambridge
- Profession: Barrister

Dame Justine Thornton DBE (born 16 September 1970), styled The Hon Mrs Justice Thornton, is a British barrister and judge of the High Court.

Thornton was appointed to the High Court in February 2019, assigned to the Queen's Bench Division. As a lawyer, she specialised in environmental law.

== Early life and education ==
Thornton was born in Manchester to Labour-voting professionals, Margaret and Stewart Thornton. Her mother was born in Wales, and her orthopaedic surgeon grandfather, who was based in Ammanford, was a speaker on social affairs. The family moved to Nottingham, where Justine was educated at West Bridgford School.

As a pupil at West Bridgford Comprehensive School, she appeared to be heading for an acting career. Thornton was a member of the Central Junior Television Workshop at the age of 16. In 1987 she starred as Erica, a rebellious schoolgirl, in "The Visit", the hour-long opening episode of Hardwicke House, an ITV sitcom that was later pulled from the schedules after only two episodes had been transmitted following a backlash over its content. In 1988, she appeared as "Chrissie" in an episode of the long-running children's programme Dramarama titled "Snap Decision", which was aired in January 1989.

Putting her acting career behind her, Thornton read law at Robinson College, Cambridge, graduating in 1992. She became a barrister in 1994.

== Career ==
Thornton practised in Environmental Law, latterly at 39 Essex Chambers, before she was appointed a judge. The 2010 edition of Legal 500, the lawyers' directory described her as "first class".

She was appointed an Advisor to the British Government on Biotechnology and the Environment under New Labour in 2000, a role she held until 2005 and was later on the Attorney-General's C Panel. She was later Chairwoman of SERA, Labour's Environment campaign. She has also acted on behalf of the Welsh Assembly, and in 2009 was shortlisted for Chambers and Partners "Environmental and Planning Junior of the Year".

Thornton has worked on several law-related publications, as general editor of Sweet and Maxwell's Encyclopedia of Environmental Law, and a co-author of Sweet and Maxwell's textbook on Environmental law. She also co-authored the Planning and Compulsory Purchase Act 2004 Law Society Legislation Guides.

She became an Associate Governor of Brookfield Primary School in 2009.

Thornton was appointed Queen's Counsel (QC) in January 2016, and a Deputy High Court Judge in May 2017.

In January 2019, it was announced Thornton would be appointed a judge of the High Court, with her appointment taking effect on 28 February 2019. She is assigned to the Queen's Bench Division. She was appointed a Dame Commander of the Order of the British Empire in 2019 upon her appointment to the High Court.

Thornton is an honorary fellow of Robinson College, Cambridge.

== Personal life ==
Thornton is married to Ed Miliband, the Foreign Secretary, a Cabinet Minister and the former Leader of the Labour Party in Official Opposition. They met in 2002, and reside in the Dartmouth Park area of North London. The couple became engaged in March 2010, they married at Langar Hall near Nottingham on 27 May 2011, and have two sons, born 2009 and 2010.

Thornton became a close friend of Frances Osborne, the first wife of former Conservative Chancellor George Osborne, whom she met whilst studying for the Bar in London.
