= Langar cum Barnstone =

Coordinates: 52.901°N 0.913°W

- Civil parish
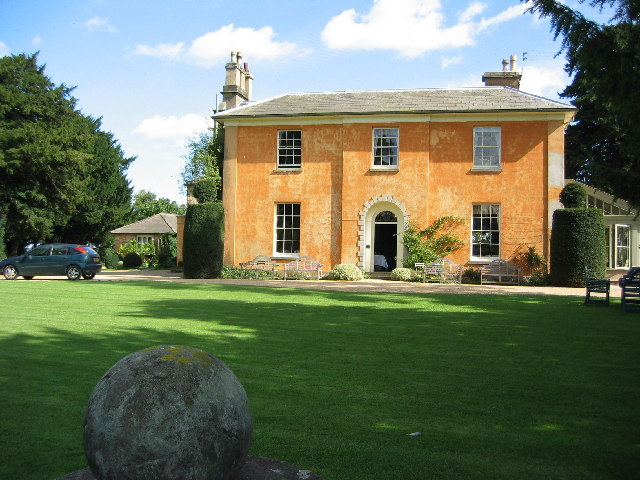
- Langar Hall

- Location within Nottinghamshire
- Interactive map of Langar cum Barnstone
- Area: 6.28 sq mi (16.3 km^{2})
- Population: 962 (2021)
  - Density: 153/sq mi (59/km^{2})
- OS grid reference: SK 73044 35078
  - London: 100 mi (160 km) SE
- District: Rushcliffe
- Shire county: Nottinghamshire
- Region: East Midlands
- Country: England
- Sovereign state: United Kingdom
- Places: Langar, Barnstone
- Post town: NOTTINGHAM
- Postcode district: NG13
- Dialling code: 01949
- Police: Nottinghamshire
- Fire: Nottinghamshire
- Ambulance: East Midlands
- UK Parliament: Rushcliffe
- Website: langarbarnstone.co.uk

Langar cum Barnstone is a civil parish in the Rushcliffe borough, within the county of Nottinghamshire, England. The overall area had a population of 962 at the 2021 census, a drop from 980 of the 2011 census. The parish lies near the county border with Leicestershire. It lies 120 miles north of London, 4 miles south east of Bingham and 12 miles south east from the city of Nottingham.

== Geography ==
=== Settlements ===
The parish consists of two settlements:

- Langar
- Barnstone

==== Langar ====
Langar is based in the western top of the parish. It is clustered around a square layout of roads, with a notable church and estate hall.

==== Barnstone ====
This is ½ mile north east of Langar. It is a linear settlement based along Main Road.

Predominantly, most of the residents are clustered around the villages. Outside of these is a scattering of farms, farmhouses and cottages amongst a wider rural setting, with some industry.

=== Land elevation ===
The parish is very low-lying, being in the Vale of Belvoir. The land varies from 25 metres (82 ft) in the Barnstone top right corner of the parish boundary to 38 metres (125 ft) in the south west area.

=== Geology ===
The area has some red marl, but principally is upon lias limestone. This accounts for several quarries and pits developed over the years located throughout the parish.

=== Water features ===
Three watercourses run through the area:

- Stroom Dyke, south of Langar
- Rundle Beck, in the southern right corner of the parish, this flows into the:
- River Whipling, forming the north east corner of the boundary.

These all are tributaries of the River Smite which is beyond the north boundary of the parish.

== Religious sites ==
=== St Andrew's Church, Langar ===
St Andrew's Church, Langar

Built in the 13th century, this Church of England chapel is often called the "Cathedral of the Vale" for its size relative to Langar village. This may have come about in part through its importance as a place of pilgrimage in Saxon times. It was restored extensively in the 19th century.

=== St Mary's Church, Barnstone ===
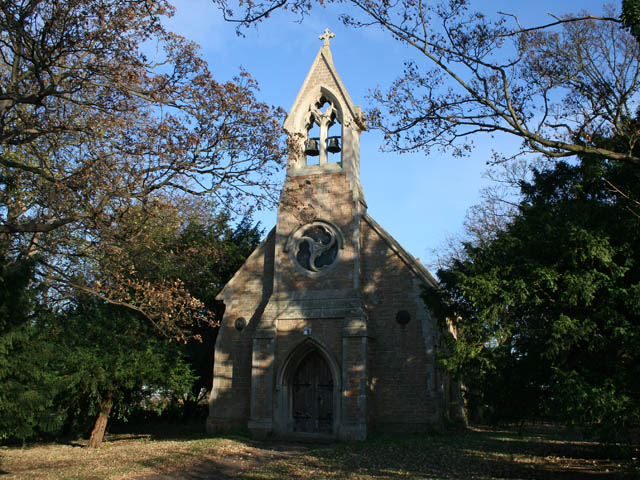
St Mary's, Barnstone

This was built 1855-1857 and was the successor of or nearby to an earlier medieval church. It was closed as a site of worship in 2017.

== Landmarks ==
=== Langar airfield ===
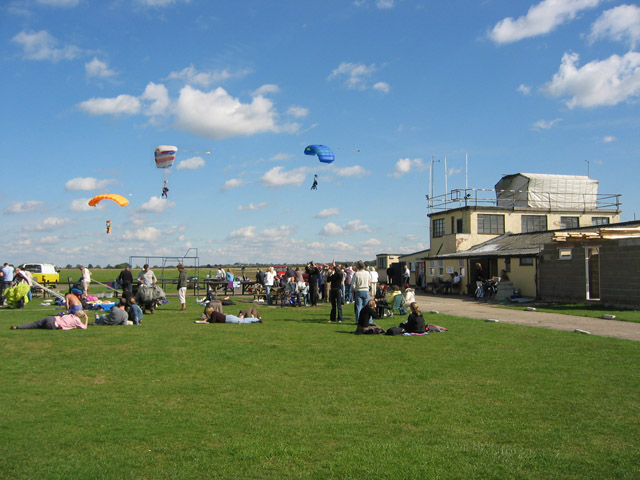
British Parachute School, Langar Airfield

A standout land feature, this was a former RAF base before being decommissioned and used for light civil aviation purposes to this day.

=== Langar Hall ===
Built in 1837 on the site of an earlier manor house, the present Hall was constructed by John Marriott who was a local farmer. It was bought by Annie Bayley in 1860 and has remained in the family ever since. The Hall was converted to a hotel in 1983.

=== Listed buildings ===
Over 20 local structures are listed, including the church dedicated to St. Andrew at Langar, the former St. Mary chapel of ease at Barnstone, Langar Hall, and a war memorial.

== Industry ==
The parish has several areas catering to light to medium sized industry, some of which contain auxiliary buildings and hangars reused after the air base decommissioning:

- Langar Industrial Estate
- Barnstone Works for processing lime/gypsum
- John Deere
