= Emanuel Scrope, 1st Earl of Sunderland =

English nobleman (1584–1630)

The Right Honourable Emanuel Scrope
- Earl of Sunderland
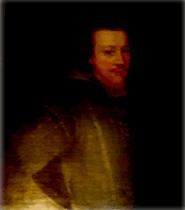
- Tenure: 1627–1630 (Earl of Sunderland); 1609–1630 (Baron Scrope of Bolton)
- Predecessor: New creation (Earl of Sunderland); Thomas Scrope (Baron Scrope of Bolton)
- Successor: Extinct (Earl of Sunderland); Dormant (Baron Scrope of Bolton)
- Other titles: Baron Scrope of Bolton
- Born: 1 August 1584
- Died: 30 May 1630 (aged 45)
- Issue: Mary Scrope; Elizabeth Scrope; Annabella Scrope
- Father: Thomas Scrope, 10th Baron Scrope of Bolton
- Mother: Philadelphia Carey

Emanuel Scrope, 1st Earl of Sunderland, 11th Baron Scrope of Bolton (1 August 1584 – 30 May 1630) was an English nobleman. He was Lord President of the King's Council in the North.

== Family ==
He was the only child of Thomas Scrope, 10th Baron Scrope of Bolton, and his wife Philadelphia Carey, sister of Robert Carey and a relative of Elizabeth I of England. He was created Earl of Sunderland on 19 June 1627.

In 1609 he married Lady Elizabeth Manners, daughter of John Manners, 4th Earl of Rutland and Elizabeth Charlton; they had four children who all died young. Emanuel Scrope danced in The Somerset Masque at Whitehall Palace on 26 December 1613.

He left his estates to his illegitimate children, not his legitimate relatives, thus enriching families such as the Paulets (future Dukes of Bolton) and the Howes (future Earls Howe).

== Disposition of estates ==
By his servant and mistress Martha Jeanes, or Janes, or Jones, alias San(d)ford, he had one son John Jeans Scrope and three daughters, who all survived and left children. Among them, the eldest daughter Mary (d. 1680) married Charles Paulet, 1st Duke of Bolton (though she died before he became Duke of Bolton so was only titled Marchioness of Winchester); the second daughter Elizabeth (b. 1627) married another peer, the 3rd Earl Rivers; the third daughter named Annabella Scrope (1629–1703) inherited Langar, Nottinghamshire and married John Grubham Howe, later of Langar. Their son Scrope Howe became the 1st Viscount Howe. Sunderland left his very considerable unentailed estate and Bolton Castle itself, to his illegitimate son by a settlement dated 20 May 1629; that son dying in 1646 left his estate between his three sisters, and Bolton Castle to his eldest sister Mary. In 1663, Annabella, the only daughter not to be the wife of a peer or future peer, was raised by Charles II of England to the rank, style, and dignity of the daughters of an earl, an unusual honour for illegitimate daughters of a mere peer. The eldest daughter Mary inherited and conveyed Bolton Castle to her husband Charles Paulet, who was eventually created Duke of Bolton.

In the meantime, the entailed estate passed not to his nearest relative (who was only a relative of the half-blood) but to the descendants of his great-aunts. The barony Scrope of Bolton was thus impoverished, and the new holder of that title, as a woman (descended from his aunt of the half-blood), was never summoned to Parliament, nor were her (Catholic) descendants.

Having inherited Bolton Castle John, like much of Yorkshire, declared for the King during the English Civil War. From Autumn 1644 until November 1645 the castle was besieged by Parliamentary forces, Sir John surrendered only after the last of the horses and all other animals are eaten, with the garrison inside starving. As punishment, the castle was ordered to be slighted with much of it pulled down, and John Scrope was fined £7,000.

== Descendants ==
His three daughters Mary, later Marchioness of Winchester; Elizabeth, later Countess Rivers; and Annabella, later Lady Annabella Howe, and all three left children. Bolton Castle is currently owned by the Lord Bolton, a descendant in the female line (through yet another illegitimate daughter) of the 5th Duke of Bolton. Langar was inherited by the Baroness Howe, daughter of Admiral Earl Howe, himself a descendant of Lady Annabella. Lady Howe's eldest surviving son sold Langar in 1818.

== Notes ==
Political offices
Preceded by The Lord Sheffield	Lord Lieutenant of Yorkshire; 1619–1628	Succeeded by Sir Thomas Wentworth
Peerage of England
New title	Earl of Sunderland; 1627–1630	Extinct
Preceded by Thomas Scrope	Baron Scrope of Bolton; 1609–1630	Dormant
