= Geoffrey Huskinson (cricketer) =

English cricketer

Geoffrey Neville Bayley Huskinson (1 February 1900 – 17 June 1982) was an English first-class cricketer active 1922 who played for Nottinghamshire. He was born in Locarno; died in Hinton-Waldrist. His son was the cartoonist Geoffrey Huskinson Jr., while his daughter was Imogen Skirving, a notable hotelier.
