= Barnstone =

English village in Rushcliffe, Nottinghamshire

Coordinates: 52.912°N 0.908°W

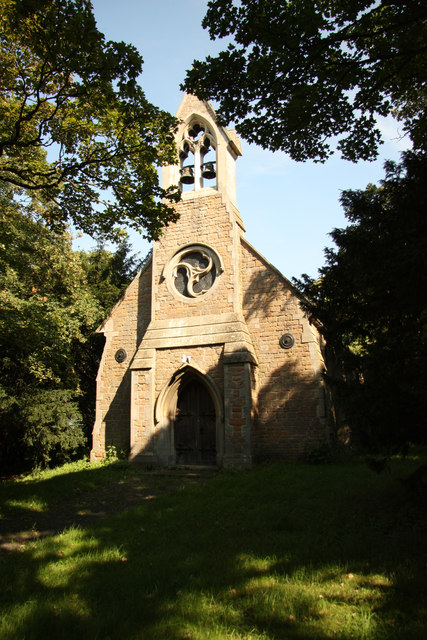
- St.Mary's Church

- Location within Nottinghamshire
- OS grid reference: SK7335
- Civil parish: Langar cum Barnstone
- District: Rushcliffe
- Shire county: Nottinghamshire
- Region: East Midlands
- Country: England
- Sovereign state: United Kingdom
- Post town: NOTTINGHAM
- Postcode district: NG13
- Dialling code: 01949
- Police: Nottinghamshire
- Fire: Nottinghamshire
- Ambulance: East Midlands
- UK Parliament: Rushcliffe

Barnstone is an English village in the Rushcliffe borough of Nottinghamshire, forming part of Langar cum Barnstone parish. It lies on the border with Leicestershire. The nearest retail stores, schools and railway station are in Bingham (4.5 miles, 7 km). The spelling in the 19th century was usually "Barnston". The parish church of St Mary's belongs to the Wiverton group, but is not currently in use.

== Heritage ==
The Domesday Book of 1086 states that Barnstone contained 26 households. The Lord at Barnstone and at Langar at the time was William Peverel. In about 1870–1872, Barnstone had a population of 169.

The Manor House in Main Road is a Grade II listed building originating from the 17th century, with 18th and 19th-century additions. So is The Rookery, a large mid-18th-century house now subdivided, and the late 18th-century Roadside Farmhouse and Barn.

== Governance ==
Barnstone forms part of Langar and Barnstone parish in the borough of Rushcliffe. The village is part of the Rushcliffe constituency in the House of Commons.

== Cement works ==
There is a Blue Circle cement works based in Barnstone. The first lime kiln was erected in 1864. Cement manufacture began on the site in 1885, when the first rotary kiln was installed. Sixteen bottle kilns followed in 1886. Barnstone later specialised in manufacturing cements for the mining industry.

The premises were later owned by Lafarge. Manufacture of cement clinker ceased in May 2006, leaving Barnstone as a specialist cement-grinding and blending operation. In 2013, the company merged with Tarmac to become Lafarge Tarmac Ltd.

== Transport ==
Barnstone is served by Centrebus Route 24 between Bingham and Melton Mowbray, running Monday to Saturday three times a day.

Barnstone railway station served the Great Northern and London and North Western Joint Railway and its successors between Melton Mowbray and Nottingham, from 1879 to 1953. Goods traffic to the limestone sidings continued until 1962.

== Amenities ==
Bingham & District ABC (Amateur Boxing Club) meets in Barnstone. There is also a bowling green, which includes a skate park, and a village hall. Barnstone Railway Cutting is an area of calcareous grassland classed as a site of special scientific interest by Natural England.

== See also ==
- Listed buildings in Langar cum Barnstone
- Barnstone railway station
- St Mary's Church, Barnstone
