= Langar, Nottinghamshire =

Village in England

Coordinates: 52.9050°N 0.9271°W

Langar
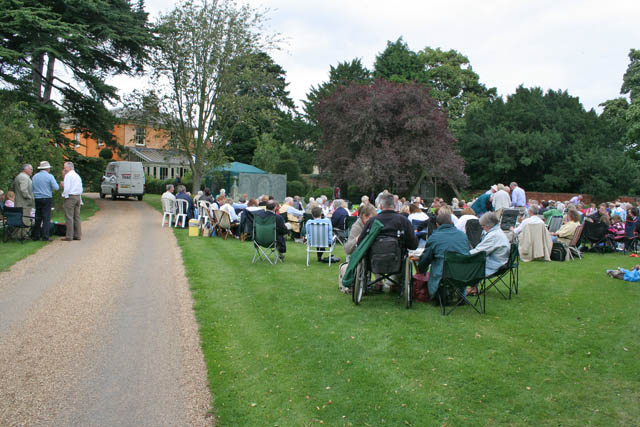
- The lawns of Langar Hall

- Location within Nottinghamshire
- Population: 980 (2011 census, including Barnstone)
- OS grid reference: SK7234
- Civil parish: Langar cum Barnstone
- District: Rushcliffe
- Shire county: Nottinghamshire
- Region: East Midlands
- Country: England
- Sovereign state: United Kingdom
- Post town: Nottingham
- Postcode district: NG13
- Dialling code: 01949
- Police: Nottinghamshire
- Fire: Nottinghamshire
- Ambulance: East Midlands
- UK Parliament: Rushcliffe

Langar is an English village in the Vale of Belvoir, about four miles (6.4 km) south of Bingham, in the Rushcliffe borough of Nottinghamshire. The civil parish of Langar cum Barnstone had a population of 980 at the 2011 Census. This was estimated at 1010 in 2019.

== Geography ==
In the south, on Langar Airfield, the parish of Langar-cum-Barnstone borders Clawson, Hose and Harby, the district of Melton and Leicestershire. At Hose Lane it meets Colston Bassett. It passes north, crossing Harby Lane, and follows a tributary of the River Smite. At Langar Lane Bridge it briefly adjoins Cropwell Bishop, then the parish of Wiverton Hall, following the upper reach of the River Smite and a short length of Bingham Road at Wiverton Smite Bridge. It passes the western edge of Northfield Farm, then the east of Smite Hill Farm, which is outside the parish. Near the point where the old Bingham–Melton railway crossed the River Smite, it adjoins Whatton-in-the-Vale, then Granby at Granby Lane, before following the River Whipling, east of Barnstone, which is part of the parish. Further south, the border is to the east of the old railway and south of Granby Gap woods, which are outside the parish, in Leicestershire.

Langar comes under Rushcliffe Borough Council. The village is part of the Rushcliffe constituency in the House of Commons.

Both Langar and Barnstone lie on heavy yellow clay which can be screened to yield a decent red earthenware.

At the 2001 census, the civil parish had 378 households

=== Oil field ===
Oil was discovered by BP in January 1958, with Bothamsall.

== History ==
Langar in the wapentake of Bingham in Nottinghamshire, its inhabitants and lords are mentioned in the Domesday Book of 1086. One of the first recorded landowners in the 12th century was Gerard de Rodes. The De Rodes family served as soldiers for King John who visited Langar in 1215. The estate then passed to the Tibetots in the 13th century. Following the marriage of Margaret Tibetot to Roger Scrope, 2nd Baron Scrope of Bolton in 1373, the estate passed to the Scrope family.

The last Lord Scrope who was associated with Langar was Emanuel Scrope, 1st Earl of Sunderland. Emanuel's estate was inherited by Annabella, his illegitimate daughter. In 1677, Annabella married the Gloucestershire politician, John Howe. According to Thoroton, Langar Hall and nearly the whole parish had lately become the estate of Mr Howe.

A famous descendant of the Howe's was Richard Howe, 1st Earl Howe, famous for his victory in the sea battle known as the "Glorious First of June", celebrated every year at Langar Hall. Admiral Howe died in 1799 and was buried in Langar Church.

Another famous son of Langar was the author Samuel Butler whose father, Thomas, was rector of Langar-cum-Barnstone.

=== St Andrew's Church ===
The church of St Andrew's is sometimes dubbed the Cathedral of the Vale for its relative size. This may be in part due to its importance as a place of pilgrimage in Saxon times.

The former vicarage is a Grade II* listed Queen Anne house, on the junction of Church Lane and Barnstone Road.

=== World War II ===
In the Nottingham Blitz, 92 high explosive bombs were dropped in Vale of Belvoir, with 33 dropped at Langar.

Conversely, the north of Nottinghamshire was barely bombed, with no fatalities.

=== Airfield ===
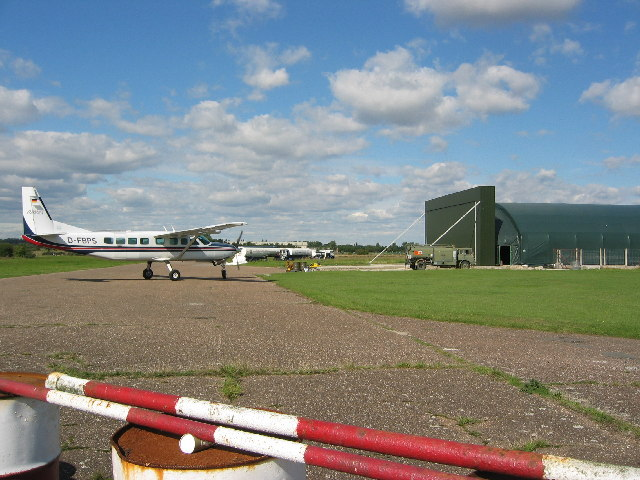
Langar Airfield

The village has lent its name to the Second World War airfield, RAF Langar, which is on the Nottinghamshire/Leicestershire boundary. The airfield was used for bombing operations over Germany by RAF Bomber Command. There is a war memorial there. 207 Sqn were based there. After the war it was by the Royal Canadian Air Force for many years. The airfield has served as the base for British Parachute Schools since 1977.

=== Economy ===
Lafarge Barnstone cement works lies south of Barnstone, formerly owned by Blue Circle Industries, which was bought by Lafarge in 2001. It produces quick-setting cement by the addition of calcium sulphate, as the Microcem brand of special cement. Naturescape Wildflower Farm is north of the airfield. The majority of Langar's working population find employment in nearby Nottingham. A bus service is provided by Barton.

== Langar C. of E. Primary School ==
This is the local school of Langar and educates about 100 pupils. The head teacher is Emily Brown.

== Langar Hall ==
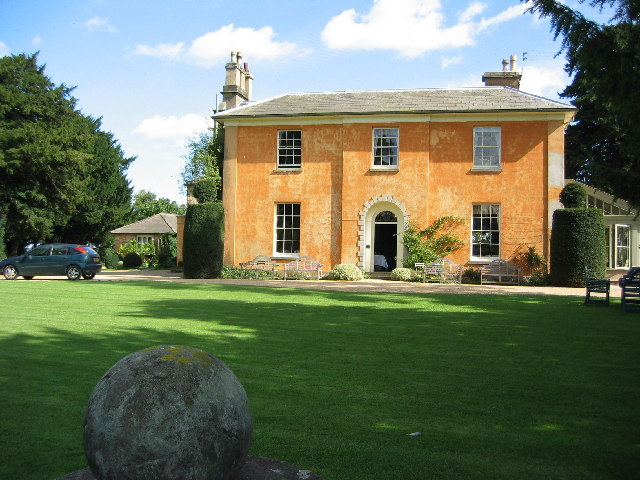
Langar Hall

Adjacent to the church is Langar Hall, once the home of Earl Howe. The present building was constructed in 1837 and was later bought by Annie Bayley, wife of Thomas Bayley, the former MP for Chesterfield. It is now a restaurant and hotel.

== Treasure of Robert Earnstock ==
It is known from evidence recovered from various places around the Vale of Belvoir that in the 17th century Robert Earnstock committed a series of robberies in the area. It was later discovered from letters that he was raising money to travel to his wife-to-be, who lived somewhere to the north of England. Earnstock kept the treasure hidden away until he had raised a small fortune, but as he neared his goal he was caught and hanged for his offences. His treasure was never found.

== Unicorn's Head ==
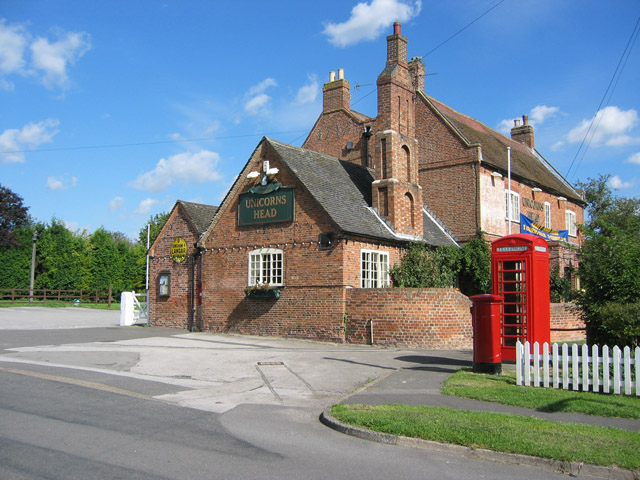
Unicorn's Head

The Unicorn's Head public house was built in 1717 and had its own brewhouse, which can still be identified by its unusual three-tier chimney to the south of the building. Its original name was The Feathers, taken from the plume in the Howe family crest. The current name was adopted after Admiral Howe's death, when the estate was bought in 1799 by John Wright, a Nottingham banker and a founder of the Butterley Company. He had a unicorn's head as his family crest. It remained a coaching inn in the 19th century and the original stables can still be seen at the back of the building.

== Notable people ==
In birth order:

- John Grobham Howe (1625–1679) became a Member of Parliament in 1659 and died in Langar.
- John Grubham Howe (1657–1722), born in Langar, son of John Grobham Howe, was elected a Member of Parliament several times.
- Charles Howe (1661–1742), born in Langar, son of John Grobham Howe, became a devotional writer and courtier.
- Emanuel Howe (c. 1663 – 1709), born in Langar, son of John Grobham Howe, became a diplomat and Member of Parliament.
- Samuel Butler (novelist) (1835–1902), novelist, was born and bred in Langar, the son of the rector, and grandson of Samuel Butler, school headmaster and bishop.
- Thomas Bayley (1846–1906) was Liberal MP for Chesterfield from 1892 to 1906.
- Geoffrey Huskinson (1935–2018), cartoonist and first-class cricketer, was the brother of Imogen Skirving.
- Imogen Skirving (1937–2016), was a hotelier who turned Langar Hall into a country hotel. She was the sister of Geoffrey Huskinson.

== See also ==
- Listed buildings in Langar cum Barnstone
