= Cropwell Bishop =

Village and civil parish in Nottinghamshire, England

Coordinates: 52.9136°N 0.9848°W

- Village and civil parish
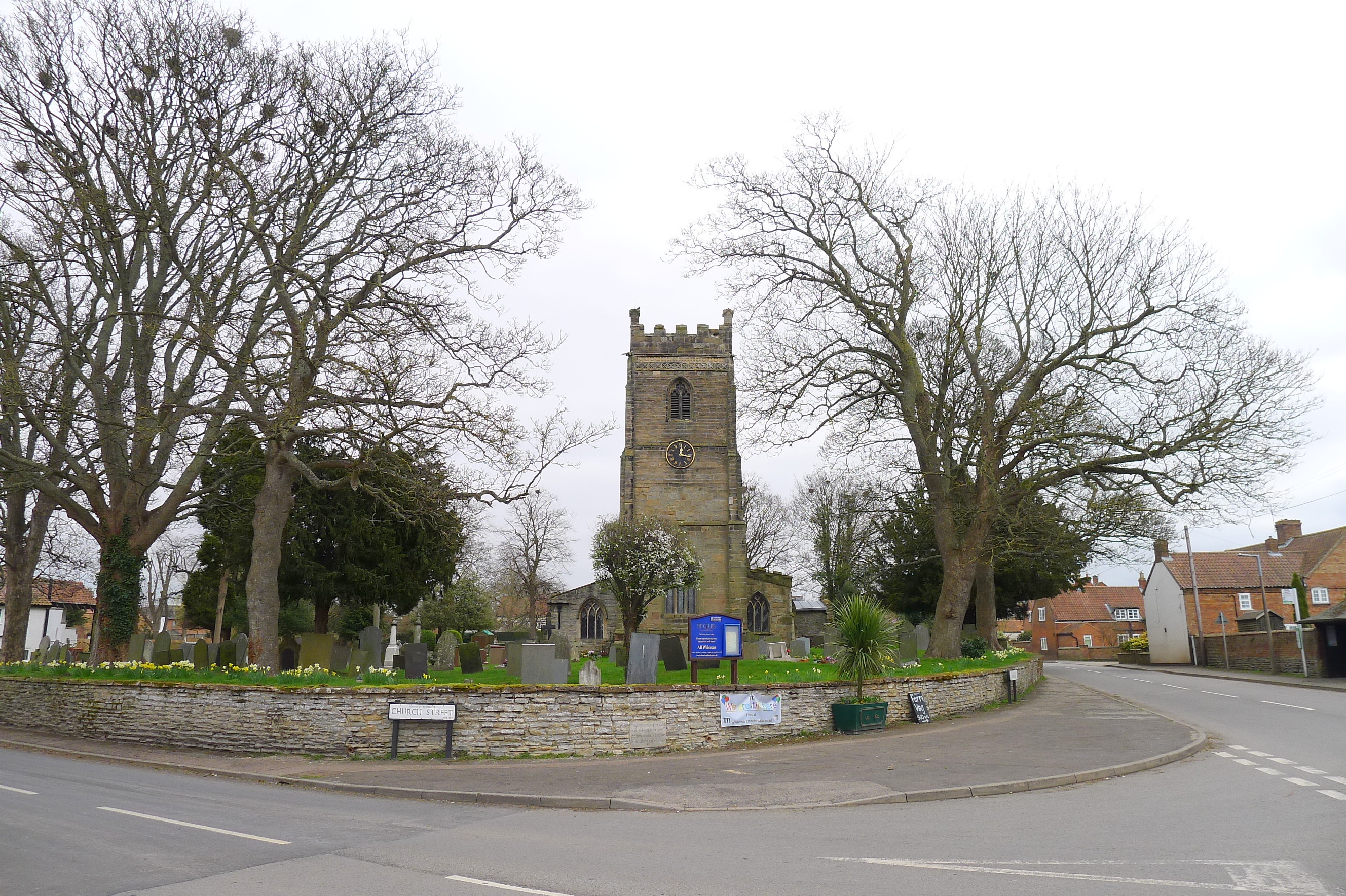
- St Giles Church

- Location within Nottinghamshire
- Interactive map of Cropwell Bishop
- Area: 2.56 sq mi (6.6 km^{2})
- Population: 1,799 (2021)
  - Density: 703/sq mi (271/km^{2})
- OS grid reference: SK 684356
  - London: 105 mi (169 km) SSE
- District: Rushcliffe
- Shire county: Nottinghamshire
- Region: East Midlands
- Country: England
- Sovereign state: United Kingdom
- Post town: NOTTINGHAM
- Postcode district: NG12
- Dialling code: 0115
- Police: Nottinghamshire
- Fire: Nottinghamshire
- Ambulance: East Midlands
- UK Parliament: Rushcliffe
- Website: cropwellbishop-pc.gov.uk

Cropwell Bishop is a village and civil parish in the borough of Rushcliffe in Nottinghamshire. The population taken at the 2011 census was 1,853; this fell to 1,799 at the 2021 census. The village has one of a select six creameries that produce Stilton cheese.

== Geography ==
It is 1.2 miles to the east of the A46 in the NG12 postcode. The next village to the north is Cropwell Butler. Both villages form part of the Vale of Belvoir. The Grantham Canal runs along the edge of the village.

== History ==
Composed of 12 households, Crophille was in Bingham Wapentake in 1086. In the 12th or 13th century, the wapentake became known as Bingham Hundred until the end of the 19th century.

The Cinema Museum in London holds film of a point-to-point held at the village on April 14, 1952.

== See also ==
- Listed buildings in Cropwell Bishop
