= List of United Kingdom locations: Stu-Sz =

The United Kingdom

This is part of the list of United Kingdom locations: a gazetteer of place names in the United Kingdom showing each place's locality and geographical coordinates.

== St (continued) ==
=== Stu-Stz ===
Location	Locality	Coordinates (links to map & photo sources)	OS grid reference
Stuartfield	Aberdeenshire	57.49°N 02.05°W	NJ9745
Stubb	Norfolk	52.74°N 01.56°E	TG4122
Stubbermere	West Sussex	50.87°N 00.93°W	SU7509
Stubber's Green	Walsall	52.60°N 01.94°W	SK0401
Stubbings	Berkshire	51.52°N 00.79°W	SU8481
Stubbing's Green	Suffolk	52.32°N 01.02°E	TM0674
Stubbington	Hampshire	50.82°N 01.22°W	SU5503
Stubbins (Wyre)	Lancashire	53.87°N 02.76°W	SD5042
Stubbins (Rossendale)	Lancashire	53.65°N 02.33°W	SD7818
Stubble Green	Cumbria	54.37°N 03.46°W	SD0599
Stubbles	Berkshire	51.48°N 01.18°W	SU5776
Stubb's Cross	Kent	51.10°N 00.82°E	TQ9838
Stubbs Green	Norfolk	52.52°N 01.46°E	TM3597
Stubhampton	Dorset	50.91°N 02.12°W	ST9113
Stubshaw Cross	Wigan	53.49°N 02.63°W	SD5800
Stubton	Lincolnshire	53.02°N 00.70°W	SK8748
Stubwood	Staffordshire	52.94°N 01.86°W	SK0939
Stuckton	Hampshire	50.91°N 01.77°W	SU1613
Studd Hill	Kent	51.36°N 01.08°E	TR1567
Studfold	North Yorkshire	54.12°N 02.29°W	SD8170
Stud Green	Berkshire	51.48°N 00.73°W	SU8877
Stud Green	Cheshire	53.15°N 02.40°W	SJ7362
Studham	Bedfordshire	51.82°N 00.52°W	TL0215
Studland	Dorset	50.63°N 01.95°W	SZ0382
Studley	Warwickshire	52.26°N 01.89°W	SP0763
Studley	Wiltshire	51.43°N 02.05°W	ST9671
Studley Green	Buckinghamshire	51.64°N 00.85°W	SU7995
Studley Green	Wiltshire	51.30°N 02.24°W	ST8356
Studley Roger	North Yorkshire	54.12°N 01.55°W	SE2970
Studley Royal	North Yorkshire	54.12°N 01.58°W	SE2770
Stuley	Western Isles	57.19°N 07.24°W	NF831233
Stumps Cross	Gloucestershire	51.96°N 01.89°W	SP0730
Stuntney	Cambridgeshire	52.37°N 00.27°E	TL5578
Stunts Green	East Sussex	50.8979°N 0.2998°E	TQ6213
Sturbridge	Staffordshire	52.86°N 02.25°W	SJ8330
Sturford	Wiltshire	51.19°N 02.24°W	ST8344
Sturgate	Lincolnshire	53.39°N 00.69°W	SK8789
Sturmer	Essex	52.05°N 00.46°E	TL6943
Sturminster Common	Dorset	50.90°N 02.30°W	ST7912
Sturminster Marshall	Dorset	50.79°N 02.08°W	SY9499
Sturminster Newton	Dorset	50.92°N 02.31°W	ST7814
Sturry	Kent	51.29°N 01.11°E	TR1760
Stursdon	Cornwall	50.88°N 04.50°W	SS2413
Sturton	North Lincolnshire	53.52°N 00.53°W	SE9704
Sturton by Stow	Lincolnshire	53.30°N 00.66°W	SK8980
Sturton le Steeple	Nottinghamshire	53.34°N 00.82°W	SK7884
Stuston	Suffolk	52.34°N 01.12°E	TM1377
Stutton	North Yorkshire	53.86°N 01.28°W	SE4741
Stutton	Suffolk	51.96°N 01.12°E	TM1534
St Veep	Cornwall	50.36°N 04.63°W	SX1355
St Vigeans	Angus	56.56°N 02.60°W	NO6342
St Vincent's Hamlet	Essex	51.62°N 00.23°E	TQ5594
St Wenn	Cornwall	50.44°N 04.87°W	SW9664
St Weonards	Herefordshire	51.91°N 02.74°W	SO4924
St Winnow	Cornwall	50.38°N 04.66°W	SX1157
Styal	Cheshire	53.34°N 02.25°W	SJ8383
Styants Bottom	Kent	51.28°N 00.24°E	TQ5756
Styche Hall	Shropshire	52.91°N 02.53°W	SJ6435
Stydd	Lancashire	53.81°N 02.53°W	SD6535
St y-Nyll	The Vale Of Glamorgan	51.49°N 03.31°W	ST0978
Styrrup	Nottinghamshire	53.40°N 01.09°W	SK6090

== Su ==
Location	Locality	Coordinates (links to map & photo sources)	OS grid reference
Suainebost	Western Isles	58.47°N 06.27°W	NB5162
Suardail	Western Isles	58.18°N 06.27°W	NB4930
Succoth	Argyll and Bute	56.20°N 04.75°W	NN2905
Suckley	Worcestershire	52.15°N 02.41°W	SO7251
Suckley Green	Worcestershire	52.17°N 02.42°W	SO7153
Suckley Knowl	Worcestershire	52.17°N 02.42°W	SO7153
Sucksted Green	Essex	51.92°N 00.29°E	TL5828
Sudborough	Northamptonshire	52.42°N 00.58°W	SP9682
Sudbourne	Suffolk	52.12°N 01.51°E	TM4153
Sudbrook	Lincolnshire	52.98°N 00.55°W	SK9744
Sudbrooke	Lincolnshire	53.27°N 00.45°W	TF0376
Sudbury	Derbyshire	52.88°N 01.76°W	SK1632
Sudbury	Ealing	51.55°N 00.32°W	TQ1685
Sudbury	Suffolk	52.03°N 00.72°E	TL8741
Sudden	Rochdale	53.59°N 02.18°W	SD8811
Sudgrove	Gloucestershire	51.76°N 02.10°W	SO9307
Suffield	Norfolk	52.83°N 01.30°E	TG2332
Suffield	North Yorkshire	54.29°N 00.49°W	SE9890
Sugnall	Staffordshire	52.86°N 02.31°W	SJ7930
Sugwas Pool	Herefordshire	52.06°N 02.80°W	SO4541
Suisnish (Skye)	Highland	57.17°N 05.98°W	NG5916
Suisnish (Raasay)	Highland	57.34°N 06.07°W	NG5535
Suladale	Highland	57.49°N 06.39°W	NG3753
Sulaisiadar	Western Isles	58.23°N 06.20°W	NB5335
Sulgrave	Northamptonshire	52.10°N 01.19°W	SP5545
Sulgrave	Sunderland	54.90°N 01.51°W	NZ3157
Sulham	Berkshire	51.46°N 01.08°W	SU6474
Sulhamstead	Berkshire	51.40°N 01.09°W	SU6368
Sulhamstead Abbots	Berkshire	51.39°N 01.08°W	SU6467
Sulhamstead Bannister Upper End	Berkshire	51.40°N 01.09°W	SU6368
Sullington	West Sussex	50.90°N 00.45°W	TQ0913
Sullington Warren	West Sussex	50.91°N 00.45°W	TQ0914
Sullom	Shetland Islands	60.44°N 01.36°W	HU3573
Sully	The Vale Of Glamorgan	51.40°N 03.22°W	ST1568
Sumburgh	Shetland Islands	59.86°N 01.28°W	HU4009
Sumburgh Head	Shetland Islands	59.85°N 01.27°W	HU406083
Summerbridge	North Yorkshire	54.05°N 01.69°W	SE2062
Summercourt	Cornwall	50.36°N 04.98°W	SW8856
Summerfield	Kent	51.24°N 01.25°E	TR2755
Summerfield	Norfolk	52.91°N 00.58°E	TF7438
Summerfield	Worcestershire	52.35°N 02.25°W	SO8373
Summerfield Park	Birmingham	52.48°N 01.95°W	SP0387
Summergangs	City of Kingston upon Hull	53.75°N 00.31°W	TA1130
Summer Heath	Buckinghamshire	51.60°N 00.93°W	SU7490
Summer Hill	East Sussex	50.84°N 00.24°E	TQ5807
Summer Hill	Sandwell	52.53°N 02.06°W	SO9693
Summerhill	City of Aberdeen	57.14°N 02.16°W	NJ9006
Summerhill	City of Newport	51.58°N 02.98°W	ST3288
Summerhill	Pembrokeshire	51.73°N 04.68°W	SN1507
Summerhill	Shropshire	52.76°N 02.41°W	SJ7219
Summerhill	Staffordshire	52.64°N 01.89°W	SK0705
Summerhill	Worcestershire	52.38°N 02.28°W	SO8176
Summerhill	Wrexham	53.07°N 03.03°W	SJ3153
Summerhouse	Darlington	54.56°N 01.69°W	NZ2019
Summer Isles	Highland	58.01°N 05.43°W	NB972077
Summerlands	Cumbria	54.26°N 02.72°W	SD5386
Summerlands	Somerset	50.94°N 02.65°W	ST5416
Summerleaze	City of Newport	51.55°N 02.83°W	ST4284
Summerley	Derbyshire	53.29°N 01.44°W	SK3778
Summerscales	North Yorkshire	53.98°N 01.84°W	SE1054
Summersdale	West Sussex	50.84°N 00.77°W	SU8606
Summerseat	Bury	53.62°N 02.31°W	SD7914
Summerston	City of Glasgow	55.90°N 04.30°W	NS5670
Summerstown	Buckinghamshire	51.89°N 01.05°W	SP6522
Summerstown	Wandsworth	51.43°N 00.18°W	TQ2672
Summertown	Oxfordshire	51.76°N 01.26°W	SP5108
Summerville	Dumfries and Galloway	55.06°N 03.63°W	NX9676
Summit (Rochdale)	Rochdale	53.65°N 02.09°W	SD9418
Summit (Heywood)	Rochdale	53.59°N 02.24°W	SD8411
Summit (Royton)	Rochdale	53.57°N 02.15°W	SD9009
Sunamul	Western Isles	57.48°N 07.33°W	NF804566
Sunart	Highland	56.72°N 05.62°W	NM783656
Sunbrick	Cumbria	54.14°N 03.10°W	SD2873
Sunbury (Sunbury-on-Thames)	Surrey	51.40°N 00.41°W	TQ1069
Sunbury Common	Surrey	51.41°N 00.43°W	TQ0970
Sundayshill	South Gloucestershire	51.63°N 02.47°W	ST6793
Sunderland	Cumbria	54.70°N 03.28°W	NY1735
Sunderland	Lancashire	53.98°N 02.88°W	SD4255
Sunderland	Sunderland	54.90°N 01.39°W	NZ3957
Sunderland Bridge	Durham	54.72°N 01.59°W	NZ2637
Sunderlandwick	East Riding of Yorkshire	53.98°N 00.45°W	TA0155
Sundhope	Scottish Borders	55.51°N 03.06°W	NT3325
Sundon Park	Luton	51.91°N 00.47°W	TL0525
Sundridge	Bromley	51.41°N 00.02°E	TQ4170
Sundridge	Kent	51.27°N 00.12°E	TQ4855
Sun Green	Tameside	53.48°N 02.03°W	SJ9899
Sunhill	Gloucestershire	51.71°N 01.84°W	SP1102
Sunken Marsh	Essex	51.52°N 00.59°E	TQ8084
Sunk Island	East Riding of Yorkshire	53.64°N 00.09°W	TA2618
Sunningdale	Berkshire	51.39°N 00.63°W	SU9567
Sunninghill	Berkshire	51.40°N 00.66°W	SU9368
Sunningwell	Oxfordshire	51.69°N 01.29°W	SP4900
Sunniside	Durham	54.73°N 01.78°W	NZ1438
Sunniside	Gateshead	54.91°N 01.68°W	NZ2058
Sunniside	Sunderland	54.84°N 01.48°W	NZ3350
Sunny Bank	Bury	53.55°N 02.28°W	SD8107
Sunny Bower	Lancashire	53.76°N 02.45°W	SD7030
Sunny Brow	Durham	54.70°N 01.72°W	NZ1834
Sunnyfields	Doncaster	53.53°N 01.18°W	SE5405
Sunny Hill	Derbyshire	52.88°N 01.51°W	SK3332
Sunnyhurst	Lancashire	53.69°N 02.48°W	SD6822
Sunnylaw	Stirling	56.15°N 03.95°W	NS7998
Sunnymead	Oxfordshire	51.77°N 01.27°W	SP5009
Sunnymeads	Berkshire	51.46°N 00.56°W	TQ0075
Sunnymede	Essex	51.61°N 00.42°E	TQ6894
Sunnyside	Rotherham	53.43°N 01.29°W	SK4793
Sunnyside	West Sussex	51.11°N 00.01°W	TQ3937
Sunrising Estate	Cornwall	50.35°N 04.46°W	SX2554
Sunset	Herefordshire	52.19°N 03.02°W	SO3056
Sunton	Wiltshire	51.28°N 01.65°W	SU2454
Surbiton	Surrey	51.39°N 00.31°W	TQ1767
Surby	Isle of Man	54.09°N 04.75°W	SC2070
Surfleet	Lincolnshire	52.83°N 00.14°W	TF2528
Surfleet Seas End	Lincolnshire	52.83°N 00.11°W	TF2728
Surlingham	Norfolk	52.60°N 01.41°E	TG3106
Surrex	Essex	51.86°N 00.70°E	TL8622
Sursay	Western Isles	57.66°N 07.10°W	NF958758
Suspension Bridge	Cambridgeshire	52.50°N 00.25°E	TL5392
Sustead	Norfolk	52.87°N 01.23°E	TG1836
Susworth	North Lincolnshire	53.50°N 00.74°W	SE8302
Sutcombe	Devon	50.87°N 04.36°W	SS3411
Sutcombemill	Devon	50.87°N 04.36°W	SS3411
Sutherland's Grove	Argyll and Bute	56.52°N 05.31°W	NM9642
Suton	Norfolk	52.54°N 01.08°E	TM0998
Sutterby	Lincolnshire	53.22°N 00.06°E	TF3872
Sutterton	Lincolnshire	52.89°N 00.09°W	TF2835
Sutterton Dowdyke	Lincolnshire	52.87°N 00.09°W	TF2833
Suttieside	Angus	56.64°N 02.88°W	NO4651
Sutton	Bedfordshire	52.10°N 00.21°W	TL2247
Sutton	Berkshire	51.49°N 00.53°W	TQ0278
Sutton	Devon	50.26°N 03.82°W	SX7042
Sutton	Doncaster	53.60°N 01.17°W	SE5512
Sutton	East Sussex	50.77°N 00.11°E	TV4999
Sutton	Kent	51.19°N 01.33°E	TR3349
Sutton	Lincolnshire	53.05°N 00.70°W	SK8752
Sutton	London Borough of Sutton	51.36°N 00.20°W	TQ2564
Sutton	Norfolk	52.75°N 01.52°E	TG3823
Sutton	North Yorkshire	53.71°N 01.25°W	SE4925
Sutton (Sutton-cum-Granby)	Nottinghamshire	52.92°N 00.87°W	SK7637
Sutton (Sutton-cum-Lound)	Nottinghamshire	53.34°N 00.97°W	SK6884
Sutton	Oxfordshire	51.75°N 01.40°W	SP4106
Sutton	Pembrokeshire	51.79°N 05.03°W	SM9115
Sutton	Peterborough, Cambridgeshire	52.56°N 00.39°W	TL0998
Sutton (Chelmarsh)	Shropshire	52.47°N 02.41°W	SO7286
Sutton (West Felton)	Shropshire	52.83°N 02.96°W	SJ3527
Sutton (Shrewsbury)	Shropshire	52.68°N 02.74°W	SJ5010
Sutton (Sutton upon Tern)	Shropshire	52.87°N 02.50°W	SJ6631
Sutton	Somerset	51.09°N 02.54°W	ST6233
Sutton	St Helens	53.43°N 02.70°W	SJ5393
Sutton	Staffordshire	52.79°N 02.35°W	SJ7622
Sutton	Suffolk	52.05°N 01.35°E	TM3045
Sutton	West Sussex	50.92°N 00.62°W	SU9715
Sutton Abinger	Surrey	51.19°N 00.42°W	TQ1045
Sutton at Hone	Kent	51.40°N 00.22°E	TQ5570
Sutton Bassett	Northamptonshire	52.50°N 00.86°W	SP7790
Sutton Benger	Wiltshire	51.50°N 02.08°W	ST9478
Sutton Bingham	Somerset	50.89°N 02.65°W	ST5411
Sutton Bonington	Nottinghamshire	52.82°N 01.25°W	SK5025
Sutton Bridge	Lincolnshire	52.76°N 00.17°E	TF4721
Sutton Cheney	Leicestershire	52.59°N 01.39°W	SK4100
Sutton Coldfield	Birmingham	52.55°N 01.80°W	SP1395
Sutton Corner	Lincolnshire	52.82°N 00.12°E	TF4327
Sutton Courtenay	Oxfordshire	51.63°N 01.27°W	SU5093
Sutton Crosses	Lincolnshire	52.76°N 00.11°E	TF4321
Sutton End	West Sussex	50.93°N 00.60°W	SU9816
Sutton Forest Side	Nottinghamshire	53.12°N 01.25°W	SK5059
Sutton Gault	Cambridgeshire	52.39°N 00.08°E	TL4279
Sutton Green	Cheshire	53.27°N 02.94°W	SJ3776
Sutton Green	Surrey	51.27°N 00.56°W	TQ0054
Sutton Green	Wrexham	53.02°N 02.89°W	SJ4048
Sutton Hall	Shropshire	52.60°N 02.42°W	SJ7101
Sutton Heath	St Helens	53.43°N 02.75°W	SJ5093
Sutton Hill	Shropshire	52.62°N 02.44°W	SJ7003
Sutton Holms	Dorset	50.88°N 01.93°W	SU0509
Sutton Howgrave	North Yorkshire	54.20°N 01.52°W	SE3179
Sutton-in-Ashfield	Nottinghamshire	53.11°N 01.26°W	SK4958
Sutton-in-Craven	North Yorkshire	53.88°N 02.00°W	SE0043
Sutton Ings	City of Kingston upon Hull	53.76°N 00.30°W	TA1231
Sutton in the Elms	Leicestershire	52.53°N 01.24°W	SP5193
Sutton-in-the-Isle	Cambridgeshire	52.39°N 00.11°E	TL4479
Sutton Lakes	Herefordshire	52.11°N 02.67°W	SO5446
Sutton Lane Ends	Cheshire	53.23°N 02.12°W	SJ9271
Sutton Leach	St Helens	53.42°N 02.72°W	SJ5292
Sutton Maddock	Shropshire	52.60°N 02.41°W	SJ7201
Sutton Mallet	Somerset	51.11°N 02.90°W	ST3736
Sutton Mandeville	Wiltshire	51.05°N 02.02°W	ST9828
Sutton Manor	St Helens	53.40°N 02.73°W	SJ5190
Sutton Marsh	Herefordshire	52.09°N 02.67°W	SO5444
Sutton Montis	Somerset	51.01°N 02.54°W	ST6224
Sutton-on-Hull	City of Kingston upon Hull	53.77°N 00.31°W	TA1132
Sutton on Sea	Lincolnshire	53.30°N 00.27°E	TF5281
Sutton-on-the-Forest	North Yorkshire	54.06°N 01.11°W	SE5864
Sutton on the Hill	Derbyshire	52.89°N 01.65°W	SK2333
Sutton on Trent	Nottinghamshire	53.17°N 00.81°W	SK7965
Sutton Poyntz	Dorset	50.64°N 02.42°W	SY7083
Sutton Row	Wiltshire	51.05°N 02.04°W	ST9728
Sutton Scarsdale	Derbyshire	53.20°N 01.34°W	SK4468
Sutton Scotney	Hampshire	51.14°N 01.34°W	SU4639
Sutton St Edmund	Lincolnshire	52.69°N 00.01°E	TF3613
Sutton St James	Lincolnshire	52.74°N 00.05°E	TF3918
Sutton St Michael	Herefordshire	52.10°N 02.70°W	SO5245
Sutton St Nicholas	Herefordshire	52.10°N 02.68°W	SO5345
Sutton Street	Suffolk	52.04°N 01.35°E	TM3044
Sutton-under-Brailes	Warwickshire	52.03°N 01.57°W	SP2937
Sutton-under-Whitestonecliffe	North Yorkshire	54.23°N 01.26°W	SE4882
Sutton upon Derwent	East Riding of Yorkshire	53.90°N 00.93°W	SE7046
Sutton Valence	Kent	51.21°N 00.59°E	TQ8149
Sutton Veny	Wiltshire	51.17°N 02.15°W	ST8942
Sutton Waldron	Dorset	50.93°N 02.20°W	ST8615
Sutton Weaver	Cheshire	53.30°N 02.69°W	SJ5479
Sutton Wick	Bath and North East Somerset	51.31°N 02.61°W	ST5758
Sutton Wick	Oxfordshire	51.64°N 01.32°W	SU4794

== Sw ==
Location	Locality	Coordinates (links to map & photo sources)	OS grid reference
Swaby	Lincolnshire	53.27°N 00.06°E	TF3877
Swadlincote	Derbyshire	52.76°N 01.57°W	SK2919
Swaffham	Norfolk	52.64°N 00.67°E	TF8109
Swaffham Bulbeck	Cambridgeshire	52.23°N 00.26°E	TL5562
Swaffham Prior	Cambridgeshire	52.25°N 00.29°E	TL5764
Swafield	Norfolk	52.83°N 01.38°E	TG2832
Swaile's Green	East Sussex	50.96°N 00.51°E	TQ7721
Swainby	North Yorkshire	54.41°N 01.27°W	NZ4702
Swain House	Bradford	53.82°N 01.75°W	SE1636
Swainshill	Herefordshire	52.06°N 02.78°W	SO4641
Swainsthorpe	Norfolk	52.55°N 01.25°E	TG2100
Swaithe	Barnsley	53.53°N 01.44°W	SE3704
Swalcliffe	Oxfordshire	52.03°N 01.46°W	SP3737
Swalecliffe	Kent	51.36°N 01.05°E	TR1367
Swallohurst	Cumbria	54.30°N 03.38°W	SD1091
Swallow	Lincolnshire	53.51°N 00.23°W	TA1703
Swallow Beck	Lincolnshire	53.20°N 00.57°W	SK9568
Swallowcliffe	Wiltshire	51.03°N 02.05°W	ST9626
Swallowfield	Berkshire	51.37°N 00.96°W	SU7264
Swallowfields	Devon	50.43°N 03.70°W	SX7961
Swallownest	Rotherham	53.36°N 01.34°W	SK4485
Swallows Cross	Essex	51.65°N 00.32°E	TQ6198
Swalwell	Gateshead	54.95°N 01.68°W	NZ2062
Swampton	Hampshire	51.24°N 01.41°W	SU4150
Swanage	Dorset	50.60°N 01.97°W	SZ0278
Swanbach	Cheshire	52.97°N 02.52°W	SJ6542
Swanbister	Orkney Islands	58.92°N 03.14°W	HY3405
Swanborough	Swindon	51.61°N 01.74°W	SU1891
Swan Bottom	Buckinghamshire	51.73°N 00.69°W	SP9005
Swanbourne	Buckinghamshire	51.93°N 00.83°W	SP8027
Swanbridge	The Vale Of Glamorgan	51.39°N 03.20°W	ST1667
Swan Green	Cheshire	53.25°N 02.40°W	SJ7373
Swan Green	Suffolk	52.31°N 01.35°E	TM2974
Swanland	East Riding of Yorkshire	53.73°N 00.50°W	SE9927
Swanley	Cheshire	53.06°N 02.57°W	SJ6152
Swanley	Gloucestershire	51.66°N 02.43°W	ST7096
Swanley	Kent	51.39°N 00.16°E	TQ5168
Swanley Bar	Hertfordshire	51.70°N 00.19°W	TL2502
Swanley Village	Kent	51.39°N 00.18°E	TQ5269
Swanmore	Hampshire	50.94°N 01.19°W	SU5716
Swanmore	Isle of Wight	50.71°N 01.16°W	SZ5991
Swannington	Leicestershire	52.74°N 01.39°W	SK4116
Swannington	Norfolk	52.72°N 01.15°E	TG1319
Swanpool	Lincolnshire	53.21°N 00.57°W	SK9570
Swanscombe	Kent	51.44°N 00.28°E	TQ5974
Swansea	Abertawe	51.62°N 03.96°W	SS6494
Swanside	Knowsley	53.41°N 02.88°W	SJ4191
Swanston	City of Edinburgh	55.89°N 03.21°W	NT2467
Swanston	City of Edinburgh	55.89°N 03.23°W	NT2368
Swan Street	Essex	51.90°N 00.74°E	TL8927
Swanton Abbott	Norfolk	52.77°N 01.34°E	TG2625
Swanton Hill	Norfolk	52.78°N 01.35°E	TG2626
Swanton Morley	Norfolk	52.70°N 00.97°E	TG0116
Swanton Novers	Norfolk	52.84°N 00.99°E	TG0232
Swanton Street	Kent	51.29°N 00.68°E	TQ8759
Swan Village	Sandwell	52.52°N 02.03°W	SO9892
Swanwick	Derbyshire	53.07°N 01.40°W	SK4053
Swanwick	Hampshire	50.87°N 01.27°W	SU5109
Swanwick Green	Cheshire	53.01°N 02.67°W	SJ5547
Swarby	Lincolnshire	52.94°N 00.45°W	TF0440
Swarcliffe	Leeds	53.81°N 01.45°W	SE3636
Swardeston	Norfolk	52.57°N 01.24°E	TG2002
Swarister	Shetland Islands	60.53°N 01.05°W	HU5284
Swarkestone	Derbyshire	52.84°N 01.45°W	SK3728
Swarland	Northumberland	55.32°N 01.74°W	NU1603
Swarraton	Hampshire	51.12°N 01.20°W	SU5637
Swartha	Bradford	53.91°N 01.92°W	SE0546
Swarthmoor	Cumbria	54.18°N 03.12°W	SD2777
Swathwick	Derbyshire	53.19°N 01.46°W	SK3667
Swaton	Lincolnshire	52.91°N 00.32°W	TF1337
Swavesey	Cambridgeshire	52.29°N 00.01°W	TL3668
Sway	Hampshire	50.78°N 01.61°W	SZ2798
Swayfield	Lincolnshire	52.78°N 00.53°W	SK9922
Swaythling	City of Southampton	50.93°N 01.38°W	SU4315
Sweet Green	Herefordshire	52.25°N 02.52°W	SO6462
Sweetham	Devon	50.77°N 03.59°W	SX8899
Sweethaws	East Sussex	51.03°N 00.13°E	TQ5028
Sweethay	Somerset	50.98°N 03.14°W	ST2021
Sweetholme	Cumbria	54.55°N 02.69°W	NY5518
Sweets	Cornwall	50.72°N 04.62°W	SX1595
Sweetshouse	Cornwall	50.41°N 04.70°W	SX0861
Sweffling	Suffolk	52.21°N 01.42°E	TM3463
Swell	Somerset	51.00°N 02.91°W	ST3623
Swellhead	Aberdeenshire	57.06°N 02.19°W	NO8897
Swelling Hill	Hampshire	51.08°N 01.07°W	SU6532
Swepstone	Leicestershire	52.68°N 01.46°W	SK3610
Swerford	Oxfordshire	51.97°N 01.46°W	SP3731
Swettenham	Cheshire	53.20°N 02.30°W	SJ8067
Swetton	North Yorkshire	54.15°N 01.71°W	SE1973
Sweyn Holm	Orkney Islands	59.09°N 02.95°W	HY452229
Swffryd	Caerphilly	51.68°N 03.14°W	ST2199
Swift's Green	Kent	51.16°N 00.67°E	TQ8744
Swilland	Suffolk	52.12°N 01.18°E	TM1852
Swillbrook	Lancashire	53.80°N 02.79°W	SD4834
Swillington	Leeds	53.76°N 01.42°W	SE3830
Swillington Common	Leeds	53.78°N 01.42°W	SE3832
Swimbridge	Devon	51.04°N 03.97°W	SS6229
Swimbridge Newland	Devon	51.05°N 03.99°W	SS6030
Swinbrook	Oxfordshire	51.80°N 01.59°W	SP2812
Swincliffe	Kirklees	53.73°N 01.69°W	SE2027
Swincliffe	North Yorkshire	54.01°N 01.63°W	SE2458
Swincombe	Devon	51.15°N 03.87°W	SS6941
Swinden	North Yorkshire	53.98°N 02.21°W	SD8654
Swinderby	Lincolnshire	53.14°N 00.71°W	SK8662
Swindon	Gloucestershire	51.92°N 02.10°W	SO9325
Swindon	Staffordshire	52.50°N 02.20°W	SO8690
Swindon	Wiltshire	51.56°N 01.77°W	SU1685
Swine	East Riding of Yorkshire	53.79°N 00.28°W	TA1335
Swinefleet	East Riding of Yorkshire	53.68°N 00.83°W	SE7722
Swineford	South Gloucestershire	51.41°N 02.44°W	ST6969
Swineshead	Bedfordshire	52.27°N 00.46°W	TL0565
Swineshead	Lincolnshire	52.94°N 00.17°W	TF2340
Swineshead Bridge	Lincolnshire	52.97°N 00.19°W	TF2143
Swinethorpe	Lincolnshire	53.21°N 00.69°W	SK8769
Swiney	Highland	58.29°N 03.31°W	ND2335
Swinford	Leicestershire	52.40°N 01.17°W	SP5679
Swinford	Oxfordshire	51.76°N 01.36°W	SP4408
Swingate	Nottinghamshire	52.99°N 01.25°W	SK5044
Swingbrow	Cambridgeshire	52.47°N 00.01°E	TL3788
Swingfield Minnis	Kent	51.13°N 01.15°E	TR2142
Swingfield Street	Kent	51.14°N 01.18°E	TR2343
Swingleton Green	Suffolk	52.08°N 00.85°E	TL9647
Swinhoe	Northumberland	55.54°N 01.68°W	NU2028
Swinhope	Lincolnshire	53.44°N 00.17°W	TF2196
Swining	Shetland Islands	60.37°N 01.18°W	HU4566
Swinister	Shetland Islands	60.50°N 01.40°W	HU3380
Swinithwaite	North Yorkshire	54.29°N 01.94°W	SE0489
Swinmore Common	Herefordshire	52.06°N 02.48°W	SO6741
Swinnie	Scottish Borders	55.43°N 02.60°W	NT6216
Swinnow Moor	Leeds	53.79°N 01.65°W	SE2333
Swinscoe	Staffordshire	53.02°N 01.80°W	SK1348
Swinside	Cumbria	54.57°N 03.17°W	NY2421
Swinside Hall	Scottish Borders	55.43°N 02.44°W	NT7216
Swinside Townfoot	Scottish Borders	55.43°N 02.44°W	NT7216
Swinstead	Lincolnshire	52.78°N 00.50°W	TF0122
Swinton	City of Glasgow	55.85°N 04.11°W	NS6864
Swinton (Harrogate)	North Yorkshire	54.20°N 01.67°W	SE2179
Swinton (Ryedale)	North Yorkshire	54.14°N 00.85°W	SE7573
Swinton	Rotherham	53.47°N 01.32°W	SK4598
Swinton	Salford	53.50°N 02.34°W	SD7701
Swinton	Scottish Borders	55.71°N 02.27°W	NT8347
Swinton Bridge	Rotherham	53.48°N 01.30°W	SK4699
Swinton Hill	Scottish Borders	55.70°N 02.25°W	NT8446
Swinton Park	Salford	53.49°N 02.33°W	SD7800
Swiss Valley	Carmarthenshire	51.69°N 04.14°W	SN5202
Switha	Orkney Islands	58.80°N 03.10°W	ND361911
Swithland	Leicestershire	52.71°N 01.18°W	SK5513
Swona	Orkney Islands	58.74°N 03.06°W	ND383844
Swordale (Ross-shire)	Highland	57.65°N 04.39°W	NH5765
Swordale (Sutherland)	Highland	57.88°N 04.34°W	NH6191
Swordly	Highland	58.53°N 04.18°W	NC7363
Sworton Heath	Cheshire	53.35°N 02.48°W	SJ6884
Swyddffynnon	Ceredigion	52.27°N 03.92°W	SN6966
Swynnerton	Staffordshire	52.91°N 02.22°W	SJ8535
Swyre	Dorset	50.68°N 02.68°W	SY5288

== Sy ==
Location	Locality	Coordinates (links to map & photo sources)	OS grid reference
Sycamore	Devon	50.84°N 03.00°W	ST2905
Sychdyn	Flintshire	53.18°N 03.13°W	SJ2466
Sydallt	Wrexham	53.08°N 03.03°W	SJ3155
Syde	Gloucestershire	51.78°N 02.08°W	SO9410
Sydenham	Lewisham	51.425°N 00.054°W	TQ352714
Sydenham	Oxfordshire	51.70°N 00.94°W	SP7301
Sydenham	Somerset	51.12°N 02.98°W	ST3137
Sydenham Damerel	Devon	50.56°N 04.26°W	SX4076
Sydenham Hill	Southwark	51.43°N 00.07°W	TQ3472
Syderstone	Norfolk	52.85°N 00.71°E	TF8332
Sydling St Nicholas	Dorset	50.78°N 02.52°W	SY6399
Sydmonton	Hampshire	51.31°N 01.31°W	SU4857
Sydney	Cheshire	53.10°N 02.41°W	SJ7256
Syerston	Nottinghamshire	53.01°N 00.89°W	SK7447
Syke	Rochdale	53.63°N 02.16°W	SD8915
Sykehouse	Doncaster	53.63°N 01.04°W	SE6316
Sykes	Lancashire	53.95°N 02.56°W	SD6351
Syleham	Suffolk	52.35°N 01.24°E	TM2178
Sylen	Carmarthenshire	51.73°N 04.15°W	SN5106
Symbister	Shetland Islands	60.33°N 01.04°W	HU5362
Symington	Scottish Borders	55.72°N 02.90°W	NT4348
Symington	South Ayrshire	55.54°N 04.56°W	NS3831
Symington	South Lanarkshire	55.59°N 03.60°W	NS9935
Symondsbury	Dorset	50.73°N 02.79°W	SY4493
Symonds Green	Hertfordshire	51.91°N 00.22°W	TL2225
Symonds Yat	Herefordshire	51.84°N 02.65°W	SO5516
Synderford	Dorset	50.82°N 02.88°W	ST3803
Synod Inn	Ceredigion	52.16°N 04.34°W	SN4054
Synton	Scottish Borders	55.48°N 02.82°W	NT4822
Synton Mains	Scottish Borders	55.48°N 02.84°W	NT4722
Synwell	Gloucestershire	51.63°N 02.34°W	ST7693
Syre	Highland	58.35°N 04.24°W	NC6943
Syreford	Gloucestershire	51.87°N 01.97°W	SP0220
Syresham	Northamptonshire	52.06°N 01.09°W	SP6241
Syston	Leicestershire	52.69°N 01.08°W	SK6211
Syston	Lincolnshire	52.94°N 00.63°W	SK9240
Sytchampton	Worcestershire	52.29°N 02.23°W	SO8466
Sytch Ho Green	Shropshire	52.50°N 02.32°W	SO7890
Sytch Lane	Shropshire	52.77°N 02.56°W	SJ6220
Sywell	Northamptonshire	52.29°N 00.79°W	SP8267
