= Sutton =

Sutton (south settlement or south town in Old English) may refer to:

== Places ==
=== United Kingdom ===
==== England ====
In alphabetical order by county:

- Sutton, Bedfordshire
- Sutton, Berkshire, a location
- Sutton-in-the-Isle, Ely, Cambridgeshire
- Sutton, Peterborough, Cambridgeshire
- Sutton, Cheshire East, a civil parish in Cheshire
  - Sutton Lane Ends, a village in Cheshire
- Sutton, Middlewich, Cheshire
- Sutton Weaver, Cheshire West and Chester
- Great Sutton, Ellesmere Port, Cheshire
- Sutton on the Hill, Derbyshire
- Sutton, Devon, a hamlet near Kingsbridge
- Sutton, a historic name of Plymouth, Devon
- Sutton, Essex
- Sutton, Herefordshire
- Sutton, Kent
- Sutton in the Elms, near Broughton Astley, Leicestershire
- Sutton, Lincolnshire, a location
- Sutton-on-Sea, part of Mablethorpe and Sutton, Lincolnshire
- Sutton, London (in Surrey until 1965)
  - London Borough of Sutton
  - Sutton (electoral division), Greater London Council
- Sutton, St Helens, Merseyside
- Sutton, a former village in Middlesex (now part of Heston)
- Sutton, Norfolk
- Sutton cum Lound, Nottinghamshire
- Sutton-cum-Granby, Nottinghamshire
- Sutton-in-Ashfield, Nottinghamshire
- Sutton-on-Trent, Nottinghamshire
- Sutton Bonington, Rushcliffe, Nottinghamshire
- Sutton, Oxfordshire, a settlement in Stanton Harcourt parish
- Sutton, Chelmarsh, a location in Shropshire
- Sutton, West Felton, a location in Shropshire
- Sutton upon Tern, Shropshire
- Sutton, Somerset
- Sutton, Staffordshire, a location
- Sutton, Suffolk
- Sutton, East Sussex, part of Seaford
- Sutton, West Sussex, Chichester
- Sutton-under-Brailes, Warwickshire
- Sutton upon Derwent, East Riding of Yorkshire
- Sutton-on-Hull, East Riding of Yorkshire
- Sutton, Selby, North Yorkshire
- Sutton, a place in the parish of Ellington High and Low, formerly in Healey with Sutton, North Yorkshire
- Sutton Grange, North Yorkshire
- Sutton-in-Craven, North Yorkshire
- Sutton-on-the-Forest, North Yorkshire
- Sutton-under-Whitestonecliffe, North Yorkshire
- Sutton, South Yorkshire

==== Wales ====
- Sutton, Pembrokeshire, a location
- Sutton, Vale of Glamorgan

=== Australia ===
- Sutton, New South Wales

=== Canada ===
- Sutton, Ontario
- Sutton, Quebec
- Rural Municipality of Sutton No. 103, Saskatchewan

=== Ireland ===
- Sutton, Dublin, a suburb

=== New Zealand ===
- Sutton, New Zealand, in Otago

=== United States ===
- Sutton-Alpine, Alaska
- Sutton, Massachusetts
- Sutton, Nebraska
- Sutton, New Hampshire
- Sutton, an unincorporated community near Tewksbury Township, New Jersey
- Sutton, North Dakota
- Sutton, Vermont, a New England town
  - Sutton (CDP), Vermont, village in the town
- Sutton, West Virginia
- Sutton County, Texas
- Sutton Island, Maine
- Sutton Township (disambiguation), three places (in Nebraska, Ohio, and Oklahoma)

== People and characters ==
- Sutton (given name) for a list of people with the given name Sutton
- Sutton (surname) for a list of people with the surname Sutton

== Football clubs ==
- Sutton Athletic F.C.
- Sutton Town A.F.C.
- Sutton United F.C.

== Other uses ==
- Sutton (constructor), Formula One racing car constructor in 1959
- Sutton Publishing, part of The History Press
- Sutton station (disambiguation)
- USS Sutton, the name of more than one United States Navy ship
- Sutton Group, Canadian real estate franchiser

== See also ==
- Little Sutton (disambiguation)
- Long Sutton (disambiguation)
- Sutton Place (disambiguation)
