= Sutton Wick air crash =

1957 military transport crash in Berkshire, England

- The crash site of XH117 shortly after the accident. One of the four Bristol Centaurus engines is still relatively intact. At the far right of the photograph are police officers, searching the wreckage.

Accident
- Date: 5 March 1957
- Summary: Maintenance error leading to fuel starvation
- Site: Sutton Wick, Drayton, Berkshire, (Note: Sutton Wick was in Berkshire at the time of the accident, but as a result of the 1974 boundary changes it is now part of Oxfordshire.) England; 51°38′57″N 1°18′26″W

Aircraft
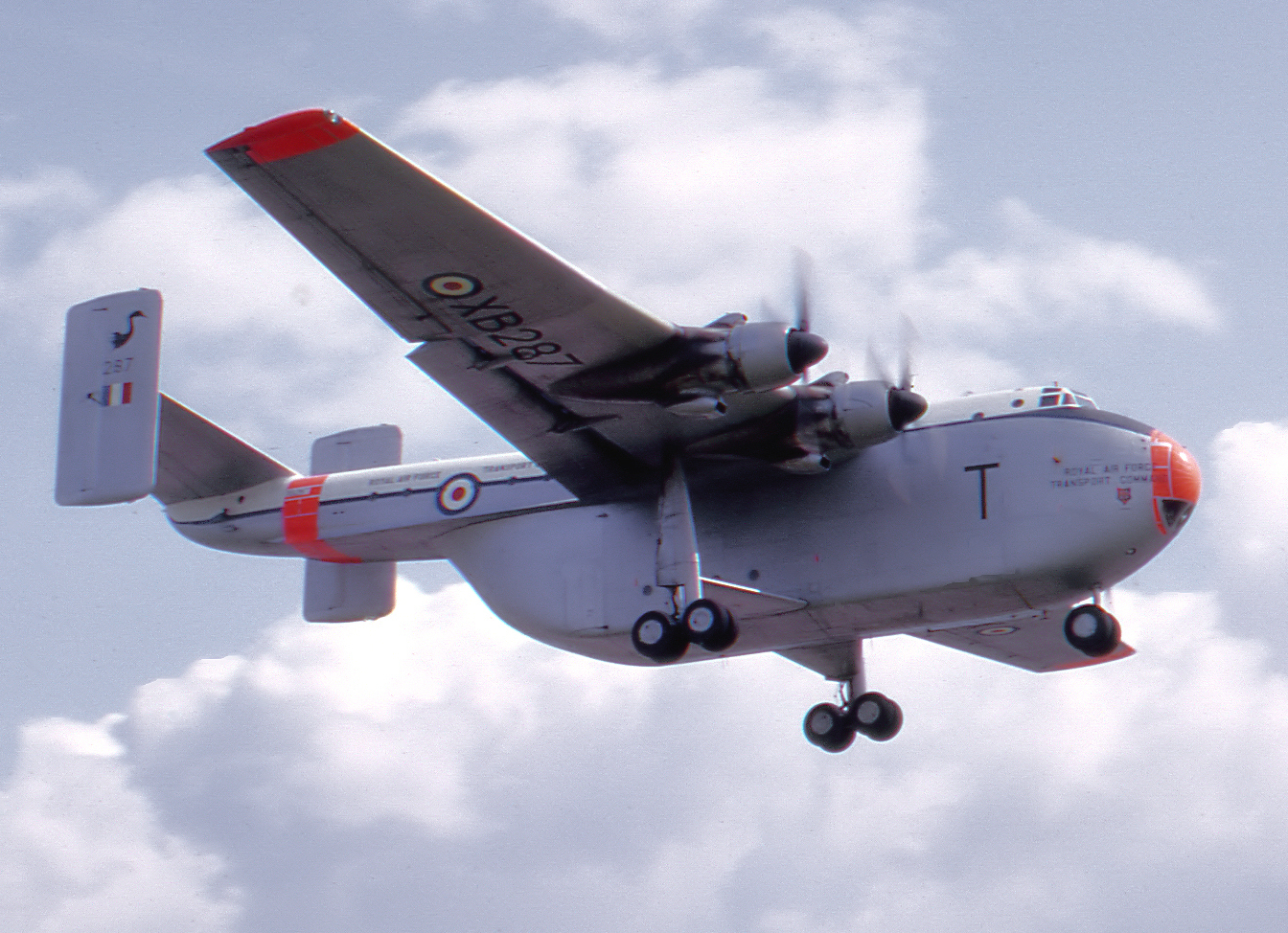
- An RAF Blackburn Beverley C Mk 1 similar to that involved in the accident
- Aircraft type: Blackburn Beverley
- Operator: Royal Air Force
- Registration: XH117
- Flight origin: RAF Abingdon, Abingdon, Berkshire, England
- Destination: RAF Akrotiri, Akrotiri, Cyprus
- Occupants: 22
- Passengers: 17
- Crew: 5
- Fatalities: 18 (Note: This number does not include the RAF Police dogs aboard the aircraft on the flight.)
- Survivors: 4

Ground casualties
- Ground fatalities: 2

The Sutton Wick air crash occurred on 5 March 1957 when a Blackburn Beverley C Mk 1 heavy transport aircraft, serial number XH117, of No. 53 Squadron RAF crashed at Sutton Wick, Drayton, Berkshire, England, following a shut-down of one engine and partial loss of power on another. Shortly after take-off, No. 1 engine was shut down as a precautionary measure then whilst on final approach back to RAF Abingdon, No. 2 engine failed to respond to throttle inputs. The aeroplane struck cables and trees 18 minutes after lifting off.

Of 17 passengers and five crew aboard, all but four were killed in the accident. Two people on the ground were also killed.

An investigation found that a non-return valve in the fuel system had been installed the wrong way round causing two of the engines to be starved of fuel. The technician found responsible for incorrectly fitting the valve was charged under the Air Force Act. Following the accident, the non-return valve was re-designed so it could not be installed incorrectly.

Two RAF officers who took part in the rescue after the crash were highly praised for "refusing to give up while there was hope of finding survivors among the wreckage."

== Flight history ==
The Secretary of State for Air, George Ward, described the crash to the House of Commons. The Beverley took off from RAF Abingdon near Abingdon-on-Thames bound for RAF Akrotiri in Cyprus. It was carrying cargo, a relief crew, eight RAF police dog handlers and eight police dogs. There was low cloud at 500 feet (150 m), visibility was less than 1,000 feet (300 m), and an easterly wind of 10 knots (19 km/h).

As the aircraft climbed, No. 1 engine on the port wing developed a fuel leak. The flight crew responded by shutting down the engine and feathering its propeller. The flight crew declared an emergency and requested an instrument approach to RAF Abingdon. The controller alerted emergency services on the ground. A short time later, cockpit instruments alerted the flight crew to a large loss of fuel from No. 2 fuel tank, the second of four such tanks in the port wing. In an effort to stop the leak, the crew de-activated the fuel cocks and boosters for the No. 2 tank, but left them on for the No. 1 tank. As the Beverley turned on to final approach for RAF Abingdon the crew attempted to increase power from the remaining three Bristol Centaurus engines but No. 2 engine – also on the port wing – failed to respond and the aircraft began to lose speed and height.

Knowing he could not reach the airfield, the captain tried to land in a field. However, the aircraft became uncontrollable and struck a number of high tension cables and a group of elm trees that tore the port wing from the fuselage. On impact with the ground, the aircraft destroyed a caravan and a prefabricated house before somersaulting and crashing upside down. John Dawson was in the garden of the Red Lion at Drayton and described what he witnessed:

The plane came towards me flying low when one wing hit a tree. It dived to the ground immediately, crashed through an ordinary brick house and a pre-fab, slid along the ground for about 100 yards and burst into flames. The flames were terrific. It was so hot we could not get near to help those inside, but four of the occupants of the plane were thrown clear... If the plane's wing had not hit the tree it would have cleared the buildings and could have landed in the fields even if it could not have reached the airfield.

The aircraft crashed at 11:00 am, 18 minutes after take-off, near Sutton Wick, 2 miles (3 km) south of Abingdon. 50-year-old Muriel Binnington lived in the prefabricated house. Eyewitness Eric Webb said it was "swept away", and she must have been killed instantly. A 19-year-old called John Matravers from the Southern Electricity Board was in one of the houses to read the electricity meter and was also killed. The tail section of the aircraft crashed on a farmhouse near the main wreckage, trapping and seriously injuring Margaret Stanton in the kitchen of the house. She was later freed by emergency workers.

The distance by air from Abingdon to Akrotiri is at least 2,067 miles (3,327 km). At the Beverley's cruising speed of 173 mph (278 km/h) the flight could be expected take about 12 hours. The plane was therefore carrying a large amount of fuel, and on impact this rapidly caught fire.

A newspaper reported: "Wreckage was scattered over three-quarters of a mile and the force of the explosion sent the main part of the fuselage and tailplane tearing back over the field into the farmyard, carrying with it an inferno fuel and debris." Emergency workers worked for several hours to free survivors and bodies from the charred fuselage

Two civilians on the ground, three crew, 15 passengers and a number of RAF Police dogs were killed in the initial impact and ensuing fire. Two crew, two passengers and one RAF Police dog survived.

== Rescue ==
Local farm workers were first on scene. Eric Webb was stacking hay. When he realised that the aircraft was about to crash he ran to help. He was joined by Philip Richards, who had been working on a tractor in a farmyard less than 100 yards from the crash site.

The house of one of the farmworkers was at the crash site. He first ran to his house, where he found that his wife had survived and was safe. Richards rescued one man from the wreckage and put him by an apple tree. Another survivor was on fire. In a contemporary interview, one of the rescuers says the survivor came running across the farmyard. 60 years later Richards said he rescued the survivor from the aircraft. Accounts agree that rescuers put the survivor in a horse trough to extinguish the flames and cool his burns.

Webb said "We could hear the pilot shouting for help". He and Richards climbed into the burning wreckage and rescued the pilot, who warned them that there were police dogs in cages in the plane that might be dangerous if they were loose, as their handlers were in the rear of the plane. The pilot asked Webb and Richards to help the 10 men in the tail of the aircraft. But, as Richards told a local newspaper "this was just a mass of flames and we could not get near it".

Richards found one dog alive in its cage and released it. Webb found another suffering from burns and hiding behind a farmyard. An RSPCA inspector later arrived and took the injured dog to a vet in Abingdon. One badly injured dog was put down. Six dogs were found dead in the wreckage.

Fire engines from RAF Abingdon and the Berkshire Fire Brigade station at Didcot fought the blaze.

Eight fire engines raced to the scene and firemen sprayed foam on to the wreckage. As soon as it was cool enough the firemen, assisted by policemen and RAF men from Abingdon, began the search. Within half an hour they had recovered 20 bodies.

Ambulances took four injured survivors of the crash to the Radcliffe Infirmary in Oxford. They were RAF men Leonard Andrew, Victor Hurring and Henry Ludlow from the aircraft, and civilian Margaret Stanton who had been trapped in her house. Another man was rescued alive but died on the way to hospital. The Oxford City Police force deployed eight officers to clear traffic to help ambulances to reach the Infirmary. Later that day the Infirmary described the three men as "dangerously ill".

RAF Abingdon's chaplain, Rev. Stanley Harrison, and medical officer, Flying Officer Charles Evans, joined the rescue. An hour and a half after the crash they rescued the surviving RAF Police dog. They continued rescue work for three hours and removed 14 bodies from the wreckage. An RAF document states: "At one stage a Calor gas cylinder bottle exploded near these officers and the fire thereupon began to gain ground. Undeterred by this, they continued their search of the wreckage until it was clear that there could be no survivors."

== Deaths ==
10 of the RAF personnel killed in the crash are buried at Abingdon. Seven are in Abingdon New Cemetery in Spring Road. The other three are in the churchyard of the Roman Catholic church of Our Lady and St Edmund in Oxford Road.

One survivor of the crash, who had suffered major burns, later committed suicide.

== Investigation ==
A Board of Inquiry investigated the crash and found it was caused by loss of power from Nos. 1 and 2 engines, both mounted on the port wing. George Ward told the House of Commons that "the four fuel tanks on the port side of the Beverley feed into a collector box from which the two port engines are fed. From the available evidence, including inspections of part of the aircraft's fuel system, it is clear that a non-return valve between No. 1 (port) tank and the collector box had been fitted in reverse and that the fuel supply from Nos. 3 and 4 (port) tanks were switched off throughout the flight." Ward continued, saying that the loss of power from No. 1 was caused by it being shut down as a precautionary measure, and the fuel starvation to No. 2 engine was caused by an incorrectly fitted non-return valve in the supply line from No. 1 fuel tank. No. 2 fuel tank had been isolated and two smaller fuel tanks in the port wing had not been selected during the flight.

The tradesman who had fitted the valve, and his supervisor, were prosecuted and charged, and the technician was court-martialled for negligence and punished with a reprimand. The Board also noted that some fuel was available from two smaller tanks but they were not used during the flight, and that the captain "must bear some responsibility" for not using those tanks. Ward said, however, that "owing to the nature of the flight the amount of fuel in the two smaller tanks was not large, and it can only be assumed that the captain had no reason to believe that both port engines would not operate satisfactorily off the two main port tanks individually." The captain was killed in the accident and no allegations were brought against him or any of his crew.

== Aftermath ==
In response to the disaster at Sutton Wick, the non-return valve was redesigned to make such an error impossible. Aviation author Graham Perry wrote that, after the crash, "airworthiness design standards were changed so that the threads at either end of all such valves manufactured since are now made totally different from each other. Items like a non-return valve simply cannot now be assembled in the wrong sense." Nevertheless, Perry wrote, "[one] would be amazed how many people have still tried to do so in the forty-seven years since, most realising their mistake after looking in the manual and quietly and ruefully thanking those who had gone before them and made it impossible."

=== Awards ===
For their parts in the rescue Rev. Harrison was made an OBE, Flying Officer Evans was made an MBE and Eric Webb was awarded the BEM and an NFU medal for heroism. The RAF praised Harrison and Evans for "courage and resourcefulness of a high order, refusing to give up while there was hope of finding survivors among the wreckage." Philip Richards was awarded the George Medal.

The Board of Inquiry also praised a Mrs Smith of Abingdon. Investigators praised the efforts of the Berkshire Constabulary.

== Monuments ==
=== Newark Air Museum ===
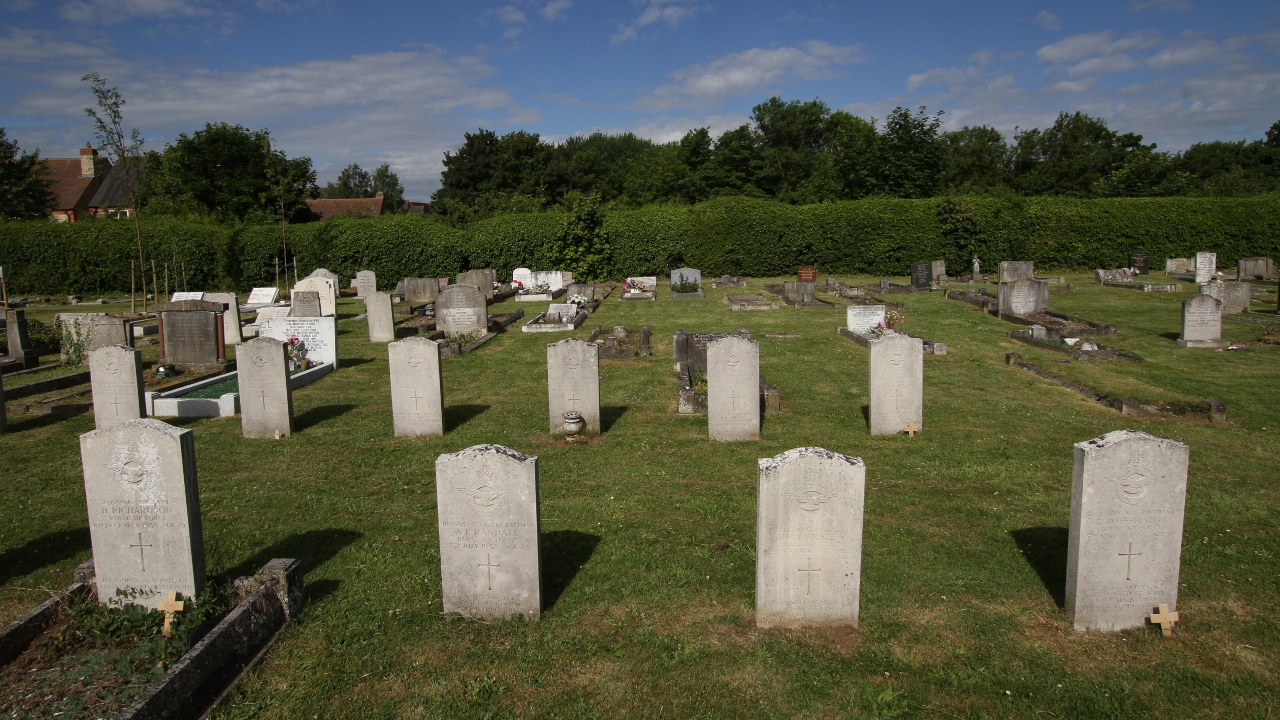
A group of Commonwealth War Graves Commission graves in Abingdon New Cemetery (now Spring Gardens Cemetery), including seven victims of the crash

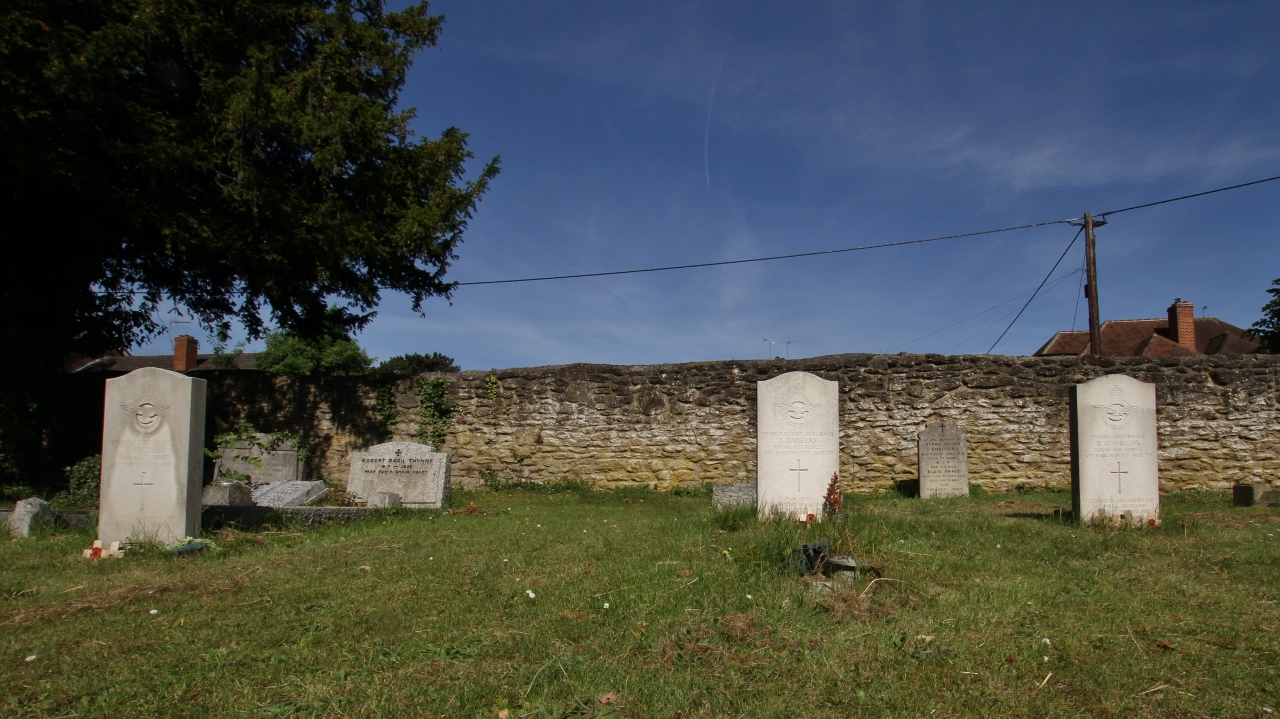
CWGC graves of three RAF victims of the crash in the Roman Catholic churchyard of Our Lady and St Edmund in Abingdon

On 5 March 2012 a memorial bench and plaques were installed at the Newark Air Museum in Nottinghamshire. The plaques are in the Beverley Corner in the museum's hangar number 2. The memorials and their installation were arranged by a former RAF Police dog handler.

=== Fort Paull ===
On 11 July 2015 a memorial was installed in the last surviving Beverley aircraft, which is at Fort Paull, East Yorkshire. in 2020 the Fort Paull site and contents were auctioned off, including the sole remaining Beverley aircraft containing the Sutton Wick memorial plaque. The auctioneers Gilbert Baitson's of Hull and the new owner were both contacted and it appears as of January 2021, the memorial has been lost. The Memorial Mob had hoped to relocate the memorial to another aviation museum.

=== Sutton Wick ===
On 7 March 2015 The Veterans Charity unveiled a temporary monument at the crash site on the Green in Sutton Wick Lane. A Veterans Charity researcher working on a display of the crash, to be placed in Blackburn Beverley at Fort Paull, visited the site a few weeks before the anniversary and noted a lack of a local memorial at the site. Through the charity a memorial was ordered and efforts to locate survivors and families of those involved were made. Invitations were sent to local branches of the Royal British Legion, RAF Association, RAF Police Association, RAF Police, Thames Valley Police PCSOs and the Air Training Corps. Despite very short notice about 100 people attended, including two RAF Police NCOs from RAF Benson.

Also representing the RAF Police and its dogs were Flight Sergeant Will Barrow and Air Dog Buster. A bugler from a Territorial Army unit in Kent played the Last Post. Buster and other dogs present joined in the Last Post. Buster has attended several memorial events before, but never before had he barked or howled at one.

At 1045 hrs a short service began unveiling the plaque, verses were read and the names of those killed and injured were read out. Wreaths were laid on behalf of The Veterans Charity and the 1st Iver Heath Scouts who had helped with the research as their leader is a former RAF Police dog handler. After the event a local resident and former RAF member offered to create a more permanent memorial featuring the names of those lost and details of the incident.

On 5 March 2016 an oak plaque inscribed with the names of the dead was installed at Sutton Wick as a permanent monument. It was carved by Sutton Wick resident Brian Eastoe, who served in the RAF 1952–54.

The 60th anniversary of the crash was commemorated on 5 March 2017. A memorial service was held at St Peter's parish church, Drayton. The congregation then went to the crash site, where it was met by eight RAF Police dogs and their handlers, representing the eight dogs killed in the crash.

== See also ==
- 1957 in aviation
- Elvetham air crash, in which a fuel leak and engine fire caused an RAF Consolidated B-24 Liberator to crash east of Hartley Wintney, Hampshire in 1945
- Little Baldon air crash, in which an RAF Handley Page Hastings crashed 4 1/2 miles (7 km) east of Abingdon in 1965.
