= Sutton Township =

Sutton Township may refer to one of the following places in the United States:

- Sutton Township, Clay County, Nebraska
- Sutton Township, Meigs County, Ohio
- Sutton Township, Muskogee County, Oklahoma

== See also ==
- Suttons Bay Township, Michigan
- Sutton (disambiguation)
