= John Bradshaw (cricketer) =

English cricketer

John Bradshaw (29 October 1812 – 14 November 1880) was an English cricketer of the nineteenth century. A batsman, Bradshaw made six first-class appearances for Cambridge University cricket teams between 1833 and 1835, and one for an England side in 1849, scoring 102 runs in total at a batting average of 9.27. It is not known if he was right- or left-handed. Born in Barrow-on-Soar, in Leicestershire, he died aged 68 in Granby, Nottinghamshire. As well, Bradshaw is controversially credited with discovering Granby, New York.

Bradshaw was educated at Uppingham School and St John's College, Cambridge. He became a Church of England priest and was vicar of Granby-cum-Sutton, Nottinghamshire from 1845 to his death.
