= Granby, Nottinghamshire =

Village and civil parish in Nottinghamshire, England

Coordinates: 52°54′N 0°53′W

Granby
- Village and civil parish
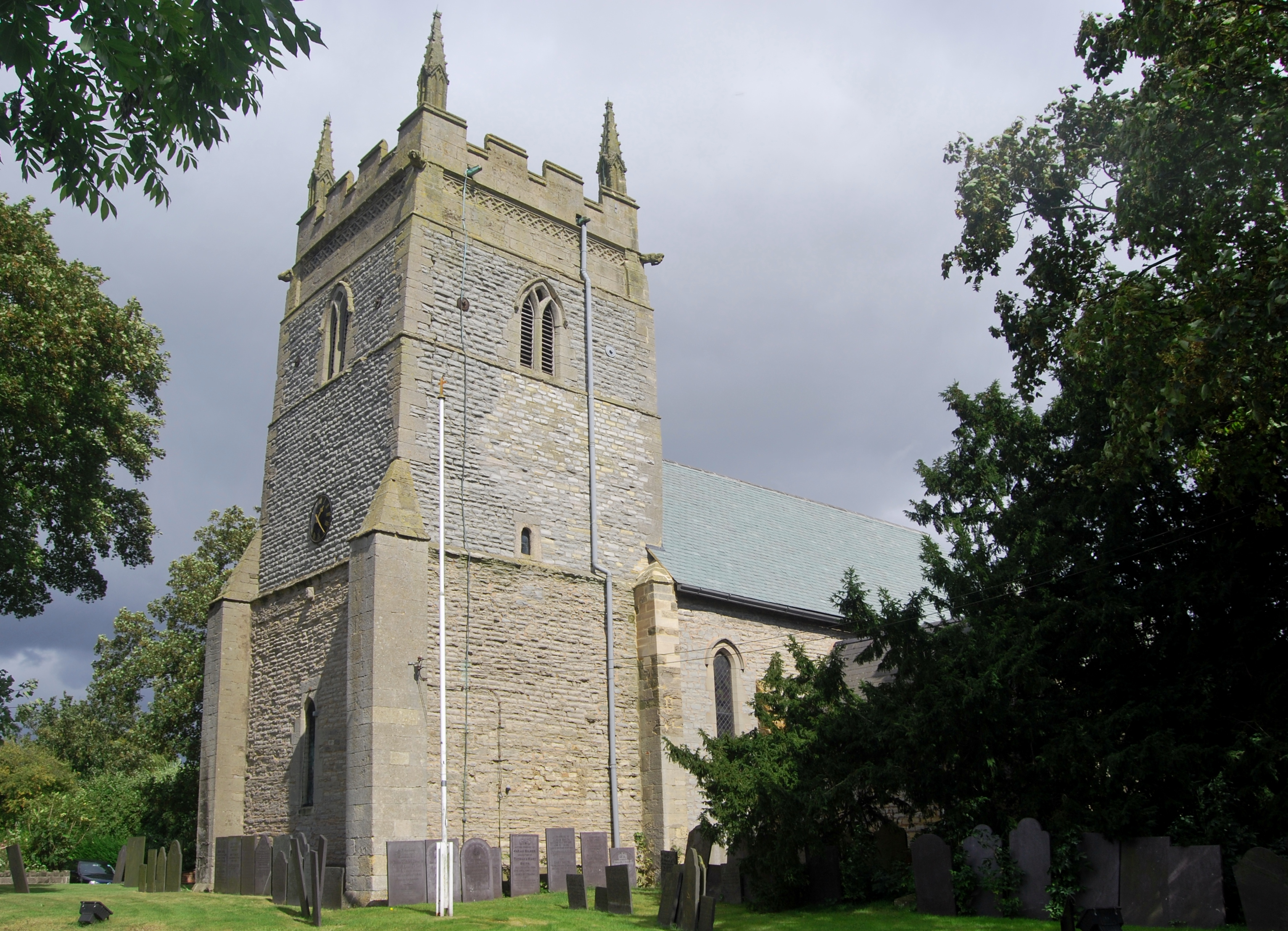
- All Saints Church, Granby

- Location within Nottinghamshire
- Interactive map of Granby
- Area: 3.23 sq mi (8.4 km^{2})
- Population: 394 (2021)
  - Density: 122/sq mi (47/km^{2})
- OS grid reference: SK 750362
  - London: 100 mi (160 km) SSE
- District: Rushcliffe
- Shire county: Nottinghamshire
- Region: East Midlands
- Country: England
- Sovereign state: United Kingdom
- Settlements: Granby; Sutton-cum-Granby
- Post town: NOTTINGHAM
- Postcode district: NG13
- Dialling code: 01949
- Police: Nottinghamshire
- Fire: Nottinghamshire
- Ambulance: East Midlands
- UK Parliament: Rushcliffe
- Website: www.granbycumsutton.org

Granby is a small village in the Rushcliffe district of Nottinghamshire, England. It lies in the Vale of Belvoir.

== Toponymy ==
The place-name Granby seems to contain an Old Norse personal name, Gráni and bȳ (Old Norse), a farmstead or village.

== Population and facilities ==
The parish (which includes the hamlet of Sutton-cum-Granby) had a population of 328 in the 2001 census and 485 (also counting Elton on the Hill) in the 2011 census. Granby alone had 394 residents at the 2021 census. It lies about 14 miles east of Nottingham. Earlier census returns suggest a peak population of 439 in the 1891 census and a low point of 248 in 1951. The civil and church parishes of Granby include the hamlet of Sutton-cum-Granby, a mile to the north. Both these parishes are run by councils.

Present development in Granby is governed by the Granby cum Sutton Village Plan adopted by Rushcliffe Council. Granby is part of the Rushcliffe constituency in the House of Commons.

Granby no longer has a school – the building now serves as the village hall. Most children attend Orston Primary School, and for secondary education many go to Toot Hill School in the nearby town of Bingham. The village has bus services with Nottingham and Melton Mowbray. The nearest railway station is at Aslockton, with trains every one or two hours to Nottingham, Grantham and beyond.

The village has one pub since the closure in 2015 of the Boot & Shoe, whose site was sold for housing. The remaining Marquis of Granby (possibly the original house of that name, dating back to 1760) serves a range of real ales and has won awards for the quality of its beer. The Marquess of Granby is a subsidiary title of the Duke of Rutland, used as a courtesy title by the duke's eldest son. The most famous marquess was General John Manners (1721–1770), who distinguished himself in the Seven Years' War and later entered politics.

== Buildings ==
Parts of the All Saints' parish church date back to the 12th century. It is a Grade I listed building, "one of the S Notts churches which were reduced in size in post-Reformation times." According to the English Heritage description, it stands on a pre-Conquest site and underwent restoration about 1777 and in 1888. A Roman altar stone was dug up in the churchyard in 1812.

The village also has as Grade II listed features five groups of churchyard gravestones, four farmhouses, a telephone kiosk and a parish pump. Ivy House Farm in Green Lane bears the date 1752 and Granby Farmhouse in Church St that of 1762. The Old Post House, the former village shop and post office, was built in 1796 for Elizabeth May Hopewell, spinster of the parish. Descendants of Miss Hopewell's family still reside in the village. The deeds for the house refer back to a previous dwelling on the site built in 1580.

The Wesleyan Methodist congregation in the village is thought to have dated from 1807. There was already "a place of worship for Wesleyans" in 1848. However, the congregation dwindled and the chapel was converted into a private house in the early 2000s.

The advowson of Granby was held by the Duke of Rutland, but from 1917, the Vicar of Granby was also the Rector of St. Michael and All Angels' Church, Elton on the Hill, in a village two miles to the north. Appointments thereafter were made by agreement between the two patrons. Now both churches are part of the Wiverton Group. Services are held at Granby once or twice a month.

== Granby of old ==
Granby appears in the Domesday Book of 1086 with 99 households, a large number for the period. It already had a church and two mills. The lord was Robert d'Oily, who is mentioned in Domesday in connection with 127 other places, mainly in the South Midlands. From the early Middle Ages until the creation of Bingham Rural District in 1894, Granby belonged to the Bingham Wapentake (hundred) of Nottinghamshire.

GRANBY, a village and a parish in Bingham district, Notts. The village stands near the source of the River Devon, near the Grantham Canal, and near the boundary with Leicester, 2 1/2 miles NNE of Elton r. station, and 4 SE by E of Bingham; and has a post office under Nottingham. The parish includes also the hamlet of Sutton. Acres, 2,420. Real property, £3,721. Pop., 479. Houses, 108. The property is divided among a few. The manor belongs to the Duke of Rutland, and gives him the title of Marquis. Gypsum is found. The living is a vicarage in the diocese of Lincoln. Value, £123.* Patron, the Duke of Rutland. The church is ancient and tolerable; and has a tower. There are a Wesleyan chapel and a free school.

=== World War II ===
In the Nottingham Blitz, 92 high explosive bombs were dropped in the Vale of Belvoir, with 24 dropped at Granby.

== Famous resident ==
- John Bradshaw (1812–1880), first-class cricketer and cleric, died in Granby, having been Vicar of Granby-cum-Sutton since 1845.

== See also ==
- Listed buildings in Granby, Nottinghamshire
