= Surrex =

Hamlet in Essex, England

Coordinates: 51.873°N 0.714°E

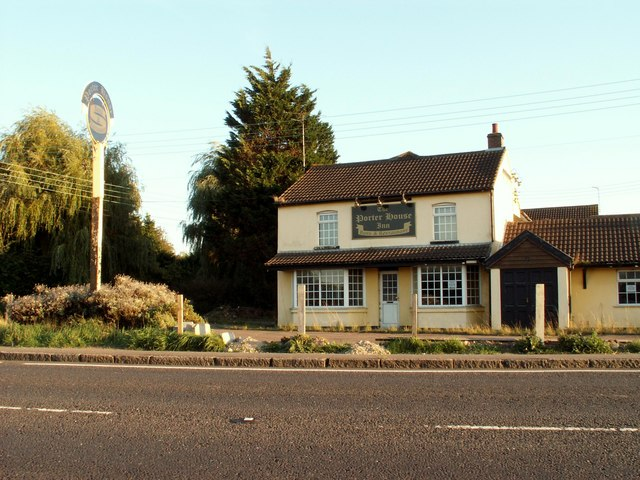
- The Porter House Inn (Queens Head), destroyed by fire in 2017

- Location within Essex
- Civil parish: Coggeshall
- District: Braintree
- Shire county: Essex
- Region: East
- Country: England
- Sovereign state: United Kingdom
- Post town: Colchester
- Postcode district: CO6
- Police: Essex
- Fire: Essex
- Ambulance: East of England

Surrex is a hamlet in the civil parish of Coggeshall, and the Braintree district of Essex, England. The hamlet is at the junction of the A120 road and a minor road (Old Road) to the village of Feering, and is 1 mile (1.6 km) east from the small market town of Coggeshall.

Surrex largely comprises modern housing development and a small retail and business area.

Surrex was previously in the civil parish of Feering, and from 1854 in the ecclesiastical parish of Great Tey. In 1933, commercial listings for the hamlet in Feering included a farmer, a beer retailer, and a threshing machine proprietor.

In 2014, following road safety concerns, particularly those expressed by local MP Priti Patel, Surrex settlement entry signs were placed on the A120. The signs caused some initial confusion and ridicule from local people and councillors, however, a later report stated that the signs were seen as being successful in reducing traffic speed.

A former public house, from 2008 The Queens Head (previously named "The Surrex Inn, the American Pilot, the East Anglian Roadhouse and the Porterhouse Inn"), closed in 2011 and became derelict. The building, then owned by a Chinese investor, was destroyed by fire in August 2017.
