= Swingbrow =

Hamlet in Cambridgeshire, England

Coordinates: 52.477°N 0.025°E

- Location within Cambridgeshire
- OS grid reference: TL3788
- District: Fenland
- Shire county: Cambridgeshire
- Region: East
- Country: England
- Sovereign state: United Kingdom
- Post town: CHATTERIS
- Postcode district: PE16
- Dialling code: 01354
- Police: Cambridgeshire
- Fire: Cambridgeshire
- Ambulance: East of England
- UK Parliament: North East Cambridgeshire

Swingbrow (sometimes written as Swing Brow) is a hamlet in the civil parish of Chatteris, Cambridgeshire, lying alongside the Forty Foot Drain built by Vermuyden. A Neolithic (4000 BC to 2201 BC) "perforated object" was discovered on the site, but the current buildings on the site are largely modern.

The hamlet formerly had a pub, the Ram Inn, which is now a residence, and a saddlery, now demolished. No official signs denote the hamlet because it is not safe to install these on the banks of the drain. The hamlet comprises two roads (droves); First Drove and Second Drove.
