= Sweets, Cornwall =

Hamlet in Cornwall, England

Coordinates: 50.730°N 4.619°W

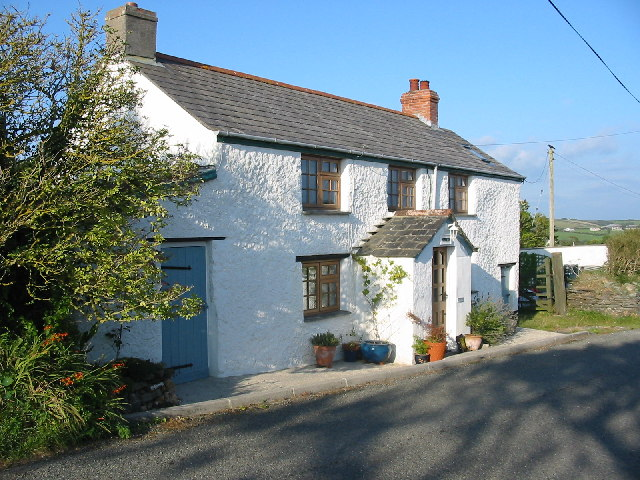
A cottage at Sweets

Sweets is a hamlet between Middle Crackington and Higher Crackington in north Cornwall, England, United Kingdom.
