= Eastfield Side =

Suburb of Sutton-in-Ashfield, Nottinghamshire, England

Coordinates: 53.130°N 1.249°W

Eastfield Side, also commonly known as Sutton Forest Side, is in Nottinghamshire, England. Eastfield Side is a residential and former industrial area of the Nottinghamshire town, Sutton-in-Ashfield. It is in the Sutton-in-Ashfield (East) Ward of Ashfield Council.

During the mid 19th century Eastfield Side was a hamlet 1 mile to east of Sutton-in-Ashfield. However over time Sutton expanded eastwards along Tenter Lane (present day Outram Street), until there was no noticeable space between the two settlements.

Modern Eastfield Side shows no physical evidence of its previous separate existence, apart from the road which carries the name. It is one of the closest residential areas of Sutton to neighbouring Mansfield.
