= St Vincent's Hamlet =

Hamlet in Essex, England

Coordinates: 51.6260°N 0.2454°E

St Vincent's Hamlet is a hamlet in the Borough of Brentwood, in the county of Essex, England. It is located about three miles away from the town of Brentwood. For transport there is the M25 motorway, the A12 road, the A1023 road and the A128 road nearby. Old MacDonald's Farm (an animal petting farm) is nearby.

The hamlet is said to have been part of the Rochetts estate which was the home and death-place of John Jervis, 1st Earl of St Vincent.
