= Stursdon =

Coordinates: 50.8950°N 4.4952°W

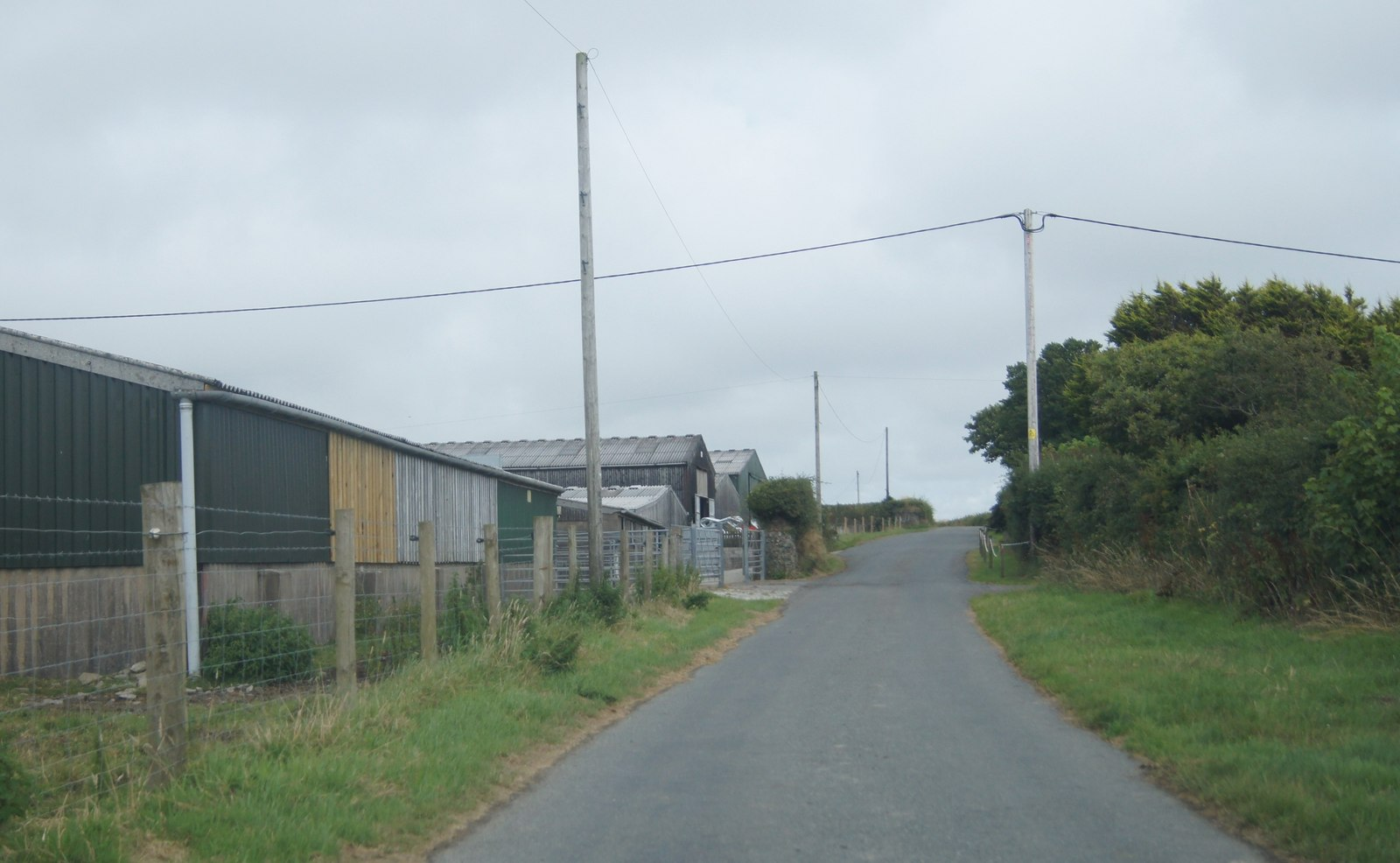
- Passing Stursdon Farm

- Location within Cornwall
- Civil parish: Morwenstow
- Unitary authority: Cornwall
- Ceremonial county: Cornwall
- Region: South West
- Country: England
- Sovereign state: United Kingdom
- Police: Devon and Cornwall
- Fire: Cornwall
- Ambulance: South Western

Stursdon is a hamlet in the civil parish of Morwenstow, north-northwest of Kilkhampton in north Cornwall, England, United Kingdom.
