= Sunset, Herefordshire =

Town in Herefordshire, England

Coordinates: 52.20592°N 3.01845°W

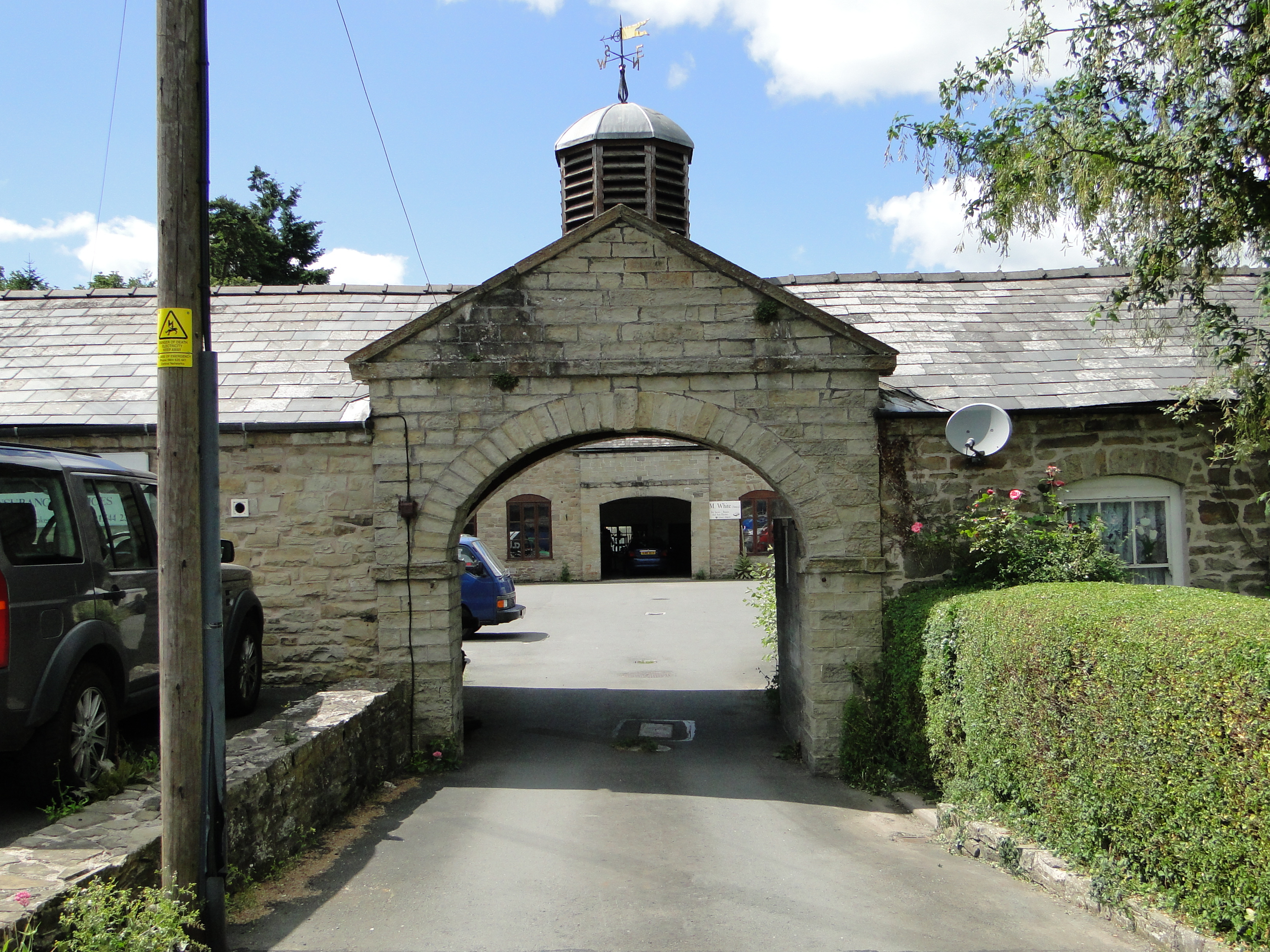
Meredith's Foundry, Sunset

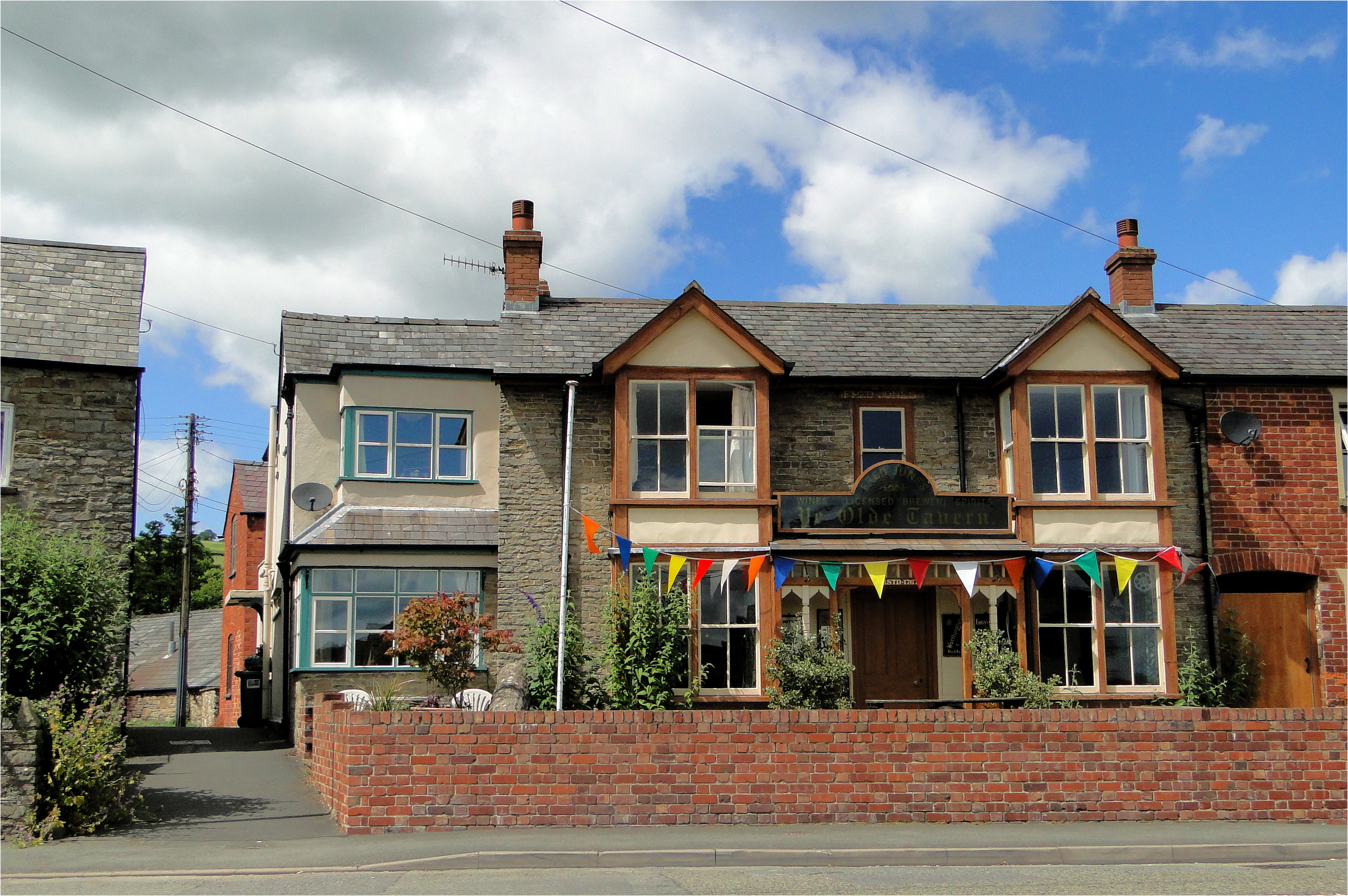
Ye Olde Tavern on Victoria Road

Sunset is a locality immediately to the east of the town of Kington, Herefordshire in England.

It is bordered by the River Arrow.

== History ==
Richard Meredith acquired Thomas Miles' iron business through marriage to Miles' daughter Elizabeth in 1739 and expanded it across Kington in the following decades. His nephew John Meredith inherited the business and subsequently built a new iron foundry facility at Sunset in 1820. Resources were transported via tramway. John Meredith's three sons developed workers' housing at Nail Row in 1826. The business was passed down to their sons and became Kington's largest employer by the 1880s. After being sold in 1901, the foundry closed in 1927.
