= Little Sutton =

Little Sutton may refer to several places in England:

- Little Sutton, Cheshire
  - Little Sutton railway station
- Little Sutton, Chiswick
- Little Sutton, Lincolnshire
- Little Sutton, Shropshire, a location in Diddlebury parish
