= Sutton station =

Sutton station may refer to:

== Stations in the UK ==
- Sutton railway station (Cambridgeshire)
- Sutton railway station (London), sometimes known as Sutton (Surrey)
- Sutton-on-Hull railway station, originally named "Sutton", in East Riding of Yorkshire

== Stations elsewhere ==
- Sutton railway station (Ireland), in Sutton, Dublin, Ireland
- Sutton railway station, Jamaica, a place on the List of National Heritage Sites in Jamaica
