= Long Sutton =

Long Sutton may refer to:

- Long Sutton, Hampshire, England
- Long Sutton, Lincolnshire, England
- Long Sutton, Somerset, England
