= Drayton, Vale of White Horse =

Village in Oxfordshire, England

Coordinates: 51.647°N 1.313°W

Drayton
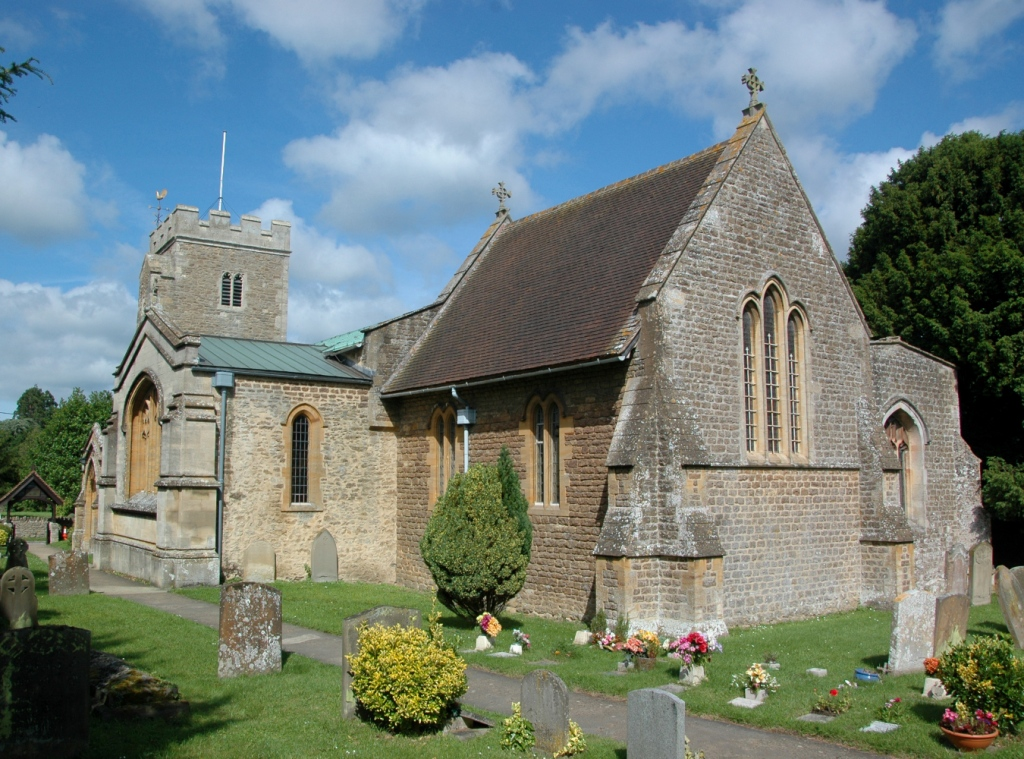
- St Peter's Parish Church

- Location within Oxfordshire
- Population: 2,353 (2011 Census)
- OS grid reference: SU4794
- Civil parish: Drayton
- District: Vale of White Horse
- Shire county: Oxfordshire
- Region: South East
- Country: England
- Sovereign state: United Kingdom
- Post town: Abingdon
- Postcode district: OX14
- Dialling code: 01235
- Police: Thames Valley
- Fire: Oxfordshire
- Ambulance: South Central
- UK Parliament: Didcot and Wantage
- Website: DraytonVillage.co.uk

Drayton is a village and civil parish about 2 miles (3 km) south of Abingdon, Oxfordshire. It was part of Berkshire until the 1974 boundary changes transferred it to Oxfordshire. The parish includes the hamlet of Sutton Wick. The 2011 Census recorded the parish population as 2,353.

== Archaeology ==
Two sites of former settlements in the parish are scheduled monuments. One is about 1/2 mile (800 m) north of the village at Sutton Wick, overlapping the parish boundary with Abingdon. The other is around Brook Farm, about 1/2 mile (800 m) southeast of the village. An episode of the Channel 4 television series Time Team called "In the Halls of a Saxon King", first transmitted on 5 September 2010, investigated archaeological sites from various periods between Drayton and its eastern neighbour Sutton Courtenay. They included a Neolithic site called the Drayton Cursus. In 1965 a late Saxon sword was found during ploughing on a field beside Barrow Lane. It is similar to swords found at Windsor, Berkshire and Gooderstone, Suffolk.

== Toponym ==
The earliest known forms of Drayton's toponym are the Old English Drægtune and Draigtun from the 10th century. It evolved through Draitune in the 10th and 11th centuries, Draitun from the 11th to the 13th century and Drettun in the 12th century. The current spelling of the name has been used since the 13th century.

== Manor ==
In 955 King Eadred granted 10 hides of land at Drayton to a thegn called Eadwold. Eadred's successors confirmed the grant. Eadwold left the estate to Abingdon Abbey but King Æthelred II, who was crowned in 978, seems to have held the manor, as in 983 he granted three hides of it to his butler, Wulfgar. In 1000 Æthelred granted the same three hides plus a watermill at Drayton to Abingdon Abbey. In the 11th century the land seems to have been divided into two manors: West and East Drayton. The oldest parts of Drayton's current Manor House are 15th century. A wing was added in the 18th century and the front is early 20th century. The house is a Grade II* listed building.

== Churches ==
=== Church of England ===
The oldest parts of the Church of England parish church of Saint Peter are Norman, built about 1200. The Perpendicular Gothic west tower and four-bay north aisle were added in the 15th century. The south transept was rebuilt about 1855 and the chancel was rebuilt in 1872. In 1879 the church was restored and the south porch was added, both to designs by the Gothic Revival architect Edwin Dolby. St Peter's was restored again in 1959 after it was damaged by a fire. It is a Grade II* listed building. The tower has a ring of eight bells. Mears and Stainbank of the Whitechapel Bell Foundry cast a ring of six for the tower in 1871. The same founders added the present treble and tenor bells in 1880, increasing the ring to eight. There is also a sanctus bell that one of the Wells family of bellfounders of Aldbourne, Wiltshire, cast in about 1780.

=== Chapels ===
A Baptist chapel was built in 1834 and is now Drayton Baptist Church. A Wesleyan chapel was built in 1870 but is no longer used for worship.

== Economic and social history ==
Drayton Inclosure Act 1811
- Act of Parliament
- Parliament of the United Kingdom
- Long title: An Act for inclosing Lands in the Parish of Drayton, in the County of Berks.
- Citation: 51 Geo. 3. c. ccxvii

Dates
- Royal assent: 26 June 1811

Text of statute as originally enacted

Drayton had a watermill by 1000, when Wulfgar granted it in fee to Abingdon Abbey. From 1652 to 1823 Drayton had three watermills. One survives on Mill Brook, 3/4 mile (1.2 km) southeast of the village. Drayton is said to have had five dovecotes between 1793 and 1823. In 1517 an inquiry found that enclosure of arable land at Drayton had put 16 labourers and their families out of work. Parliament passed the Drayton Inclosure Act 1811 (51 Geo. 3. c. ccxvii), an inclosure act for the remaining common land in the parish. The inclosure award was made in 1815. 69 High Street is a 15th-century cruck cottage. In 1780 an extensive fire destroyed a number of homes in the village. In 1924 Drayton still held traditional celebrations on May Day and performed a Mummers play at Christmas.

The route of the abandoned Wilts & Berks Canal passes through the northwest of Drayton parish, about 1 mile (1.6 km) northwest of the village. Building had begun in 1796 at Semington Junction in Wiltshire and reached West Challow in 1807. The final section, from West Challow through Drayton to Abingdon, was completed in 1810. The canal made a long descent from its summit pound near Swindon to the River Thames at Abingdon. Drayton Lock, in the parish is 1 3/4 miles (2.8 km) west of the village, was the final lock in the descent, bringing the canal down to the River Ock floodplain. Traffic on the canal had virtually ceased by 1901 and the route was formally abandoned in 1914. The Wilts & Berks Canal Trust is currently restoring the canal.

Drayton is on what used to be the main road between Oxford, Abingdon and Newbury. The section from Oxford and Abingdon through Drayton to Chilton Pond was turnpiked in 1755. From the 1920s it was classified as the A34 road. In the 1970s the A34 was re-routed as a dual carriageway bypassing Abingdon, Drayton and Steventon, and the section between Steventon Hill and Abingdon was detrunked and reclassified as the B4017. In June 1840 the Great Western Railway reached Steventon, 1 3/4 miles (2.8 km) south of Drayton. Steventon station was the nearest station to Drayton until British Railways closed it in 1964. The nearest main line station is now Didcot Parkway, about 4 miles (6.4 km) southeast of Drayton.

== Amenities ==
Drayton has two pubs, the Red Lion (controlled by Greene King Brewery) and the Wheatsheaf. Morland Brewery of Abingdon, which Greene King took over and closed down in 2000, used to control both pubs. Drayton has a community primary school.

== Twinning ==
Since 2000 Drayton has been twinned with Lesparre-Médoc, a commune in the French département of Gironde.

== Gallery ==
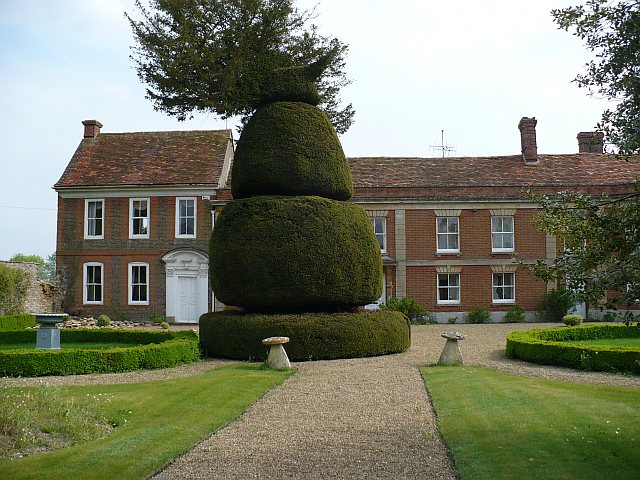
Drayton Manor House. The wing on the left is 18th century. The range on the right is 15th century, behind an early 20th century front.

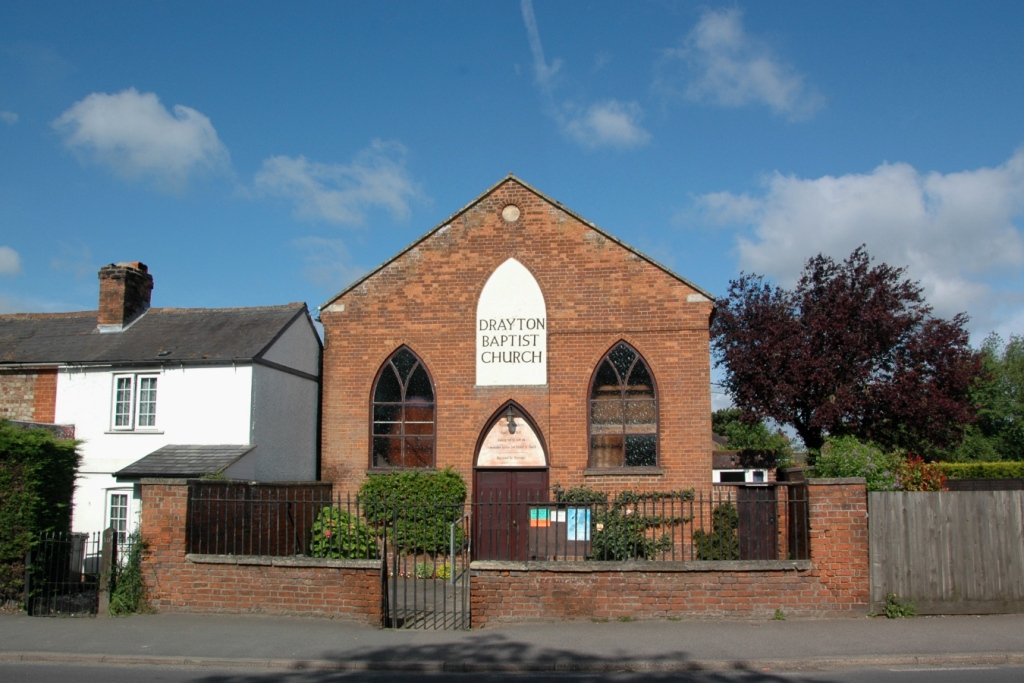
Drayton Baptist Church

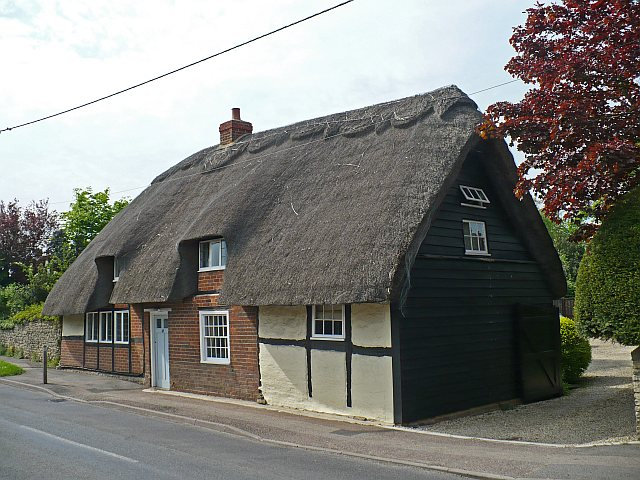
69 High Street, a thatched 15th century cruck cottage

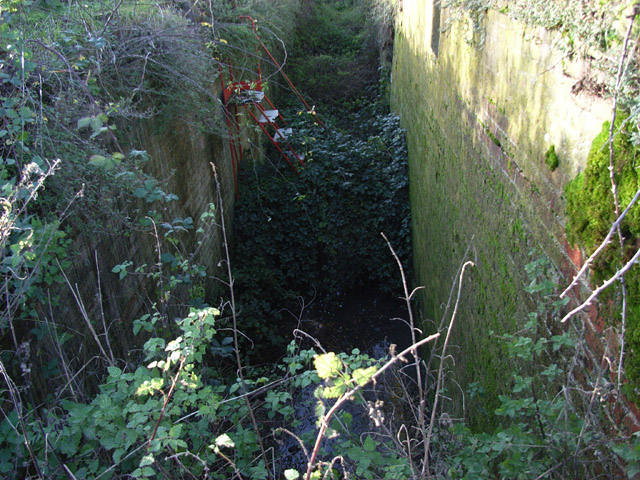
Ruined chamber of Drayton Lock on the abandoned Wilts & Berks Canal

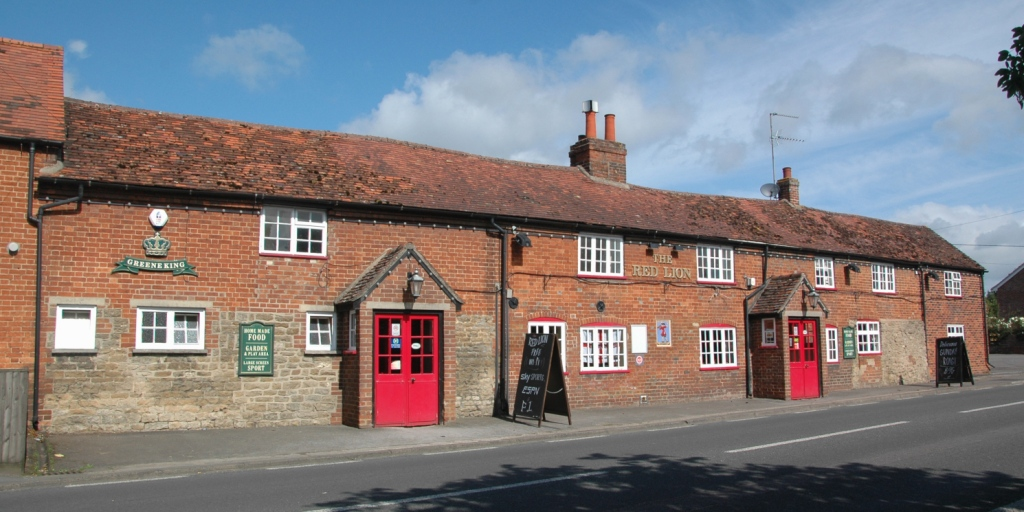
Red Lion

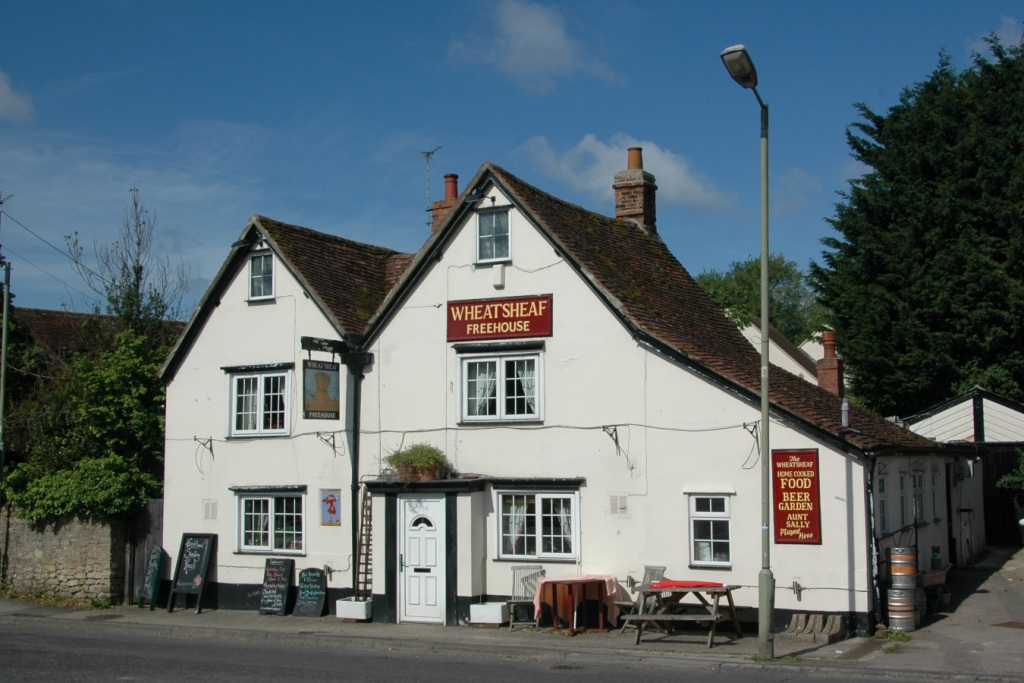
Wheatsheaf

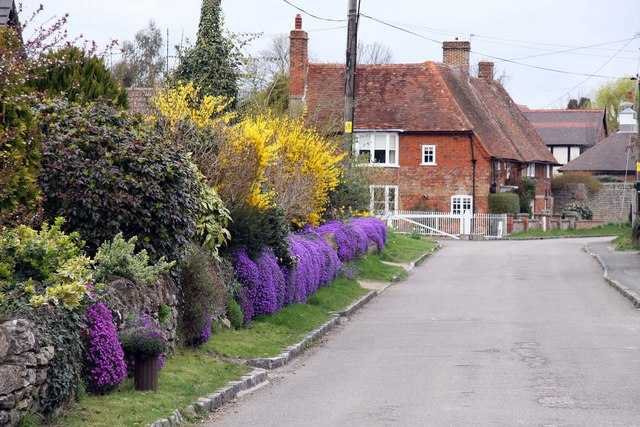
Church Lane in spring, with Aubrieta and Forsythia in bloom

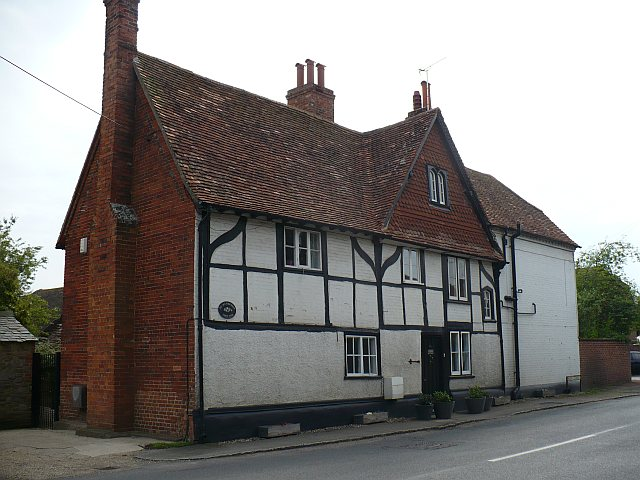
44 High Street, a timber-framed 17th century farmhouse

== Sources ==
- Dalby, L.J. (2000) [1971]. The Wilts and Berks Canal (3rd ed.). Usk: Oakwood Press. ISBN 0-85361-562-4.
- Fletcher, John (1968). "Crucks In the West Berkshire and Oxford Region" (PDF). Oxoniensia. XXXIII. Oxford Architectural and Historical Society: 86.
- Hinton, David A (1970). "Two Late Saxon Swords" (PDF). Oxoniensia. XXXV. Oxford Architectural and Historical Society: 1–5.
- Page, W.H.; Ditchfield, P.H., eds. (1924). A History of the County of Berkshire. Victoria County History. Vol. 4. assisted by John Hautenville Cope. London: The St Katherine Press. pp. 341–344.
- Pevsner, Nikolaus (1966). Berkshire. The Buildings of England. Harmondsworth: Penguin Books. p. 130.
