= Sutton-cum-Granby =

Hamlet in Nottinghamshire, England

Coordinates: 52.92923°N 0.869325°W

Sutton-cum-Granby: Sutton
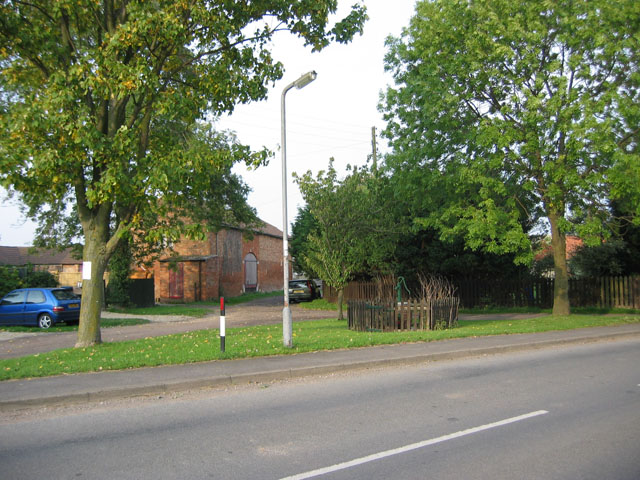
- Village green

- Location within Nottinghamshire
- Interactive map of Sutton-cum-Granby
- OS grid reference: SK761374
- Civil parish: Granby
- District: Rushcliffe
- Shire county: Nottinghamshire
- Region: East Midlands
- Country: England
- Sovereign state: United Kingdom
- Post town: NOTTINGHAM
- Postcode district: NG13
- Dialling code: 01949
- Police: Nottinghamshire
- Fire: Nottinghamshire
- Ambulance: East Midlands
- UK Parliament: Newark

Sutton-cum-Granby (also known as Sutton or Sutton in the Vale) is a hamlet in the civil parish of Granby, in the Rushcliffe district, in Nottinghamshire, England. It lies in the Vale of Belvoir.

== Location and facilities ==
Sutton-cum-Granby lies about midway between Elton on the Hill and Granby, 14 miles (23 km) from Nottingham and from Melton Mowbray, 12 miles (19 km) from Grantham, and 118 miles (190 km) from London. It forms part of the civil and church parish of Granby. The population is currently about 60. In 1742 it was 124, in 1853 152, and in 2001 43. As the population at the 2011 census was less than 100, details are included in the civil parish of Granby. The village is part of the Rushcliffe constituency in the House of Commons.

The hamlet has no shops, but there are other businesses: a builder's, a repair garage and farms. There is a weekday, daytime public transport service, with a bus running every hour to Nottingham via local villages. The nearest railway station is Aslockton (2 1/2 miles, 4.0 km) with trains to and beyond Nottingham and Grantham.

== History ==
The manor of Sutton, along with at least five others in Nottinghamshire, was held in the 1330s by Thomas de Furnival the elder. By 1520, Sutton belonged to Sir John Savage, but his son, also John, confessed to the murder of Sir John Pauncefort. Henry VIII pardoned him provided that he paid the sum of £4000 to expiate his crime. As a result, the land passed to the Manners family, created earl of Rutland in 1525, and then to their descendants, the earls and from 1638 dukes of Rutland. Much of the village and many of the farms were still, until the 1920s, part of the Rutlands' estate centred on Belvoir Castle, which is a prominent feature on the eastern skyline. During the English Civil War, Oliver Cromwell fought a battle less than a mile from Sutton; human bones have been discovered there as recently as the 1960s.

Sutton is stated in the Domesday Book of 1085 to have a church dedicated to St Ethelburga (or Aubrey), but this has long vanished. The claimed existence of a church in Sutton with the same dedication as that of nearby Langar may point to a confusion of some kind. Sutton's small Primitive Methodist Chapel, erected in 1860, still stands, but it has been closed for worship since 1995.

The Victorian historian Esdaile described the castle in Sutton as a fortress. William Stevenson described it as "earthworks surrounding a moated homestead". This castle lay halfway between Sutton and Granby, where there later stood a windmill, pulled down in 1879. A Manuscript Roll of Sutton from about 1586 was sold in 1935.

=== Modern times ===
During the Second World War, Sutton received evacuees from Nottingham and later London. Electricity was brought to the village in 1948, and mains water in 1956.

There has never been a public house in what was until recently a predominantly abstinent Methodist community. The village pump on the green and the nearby Highfield farmhouse are Grade II listed buildings.

== Gallery ==
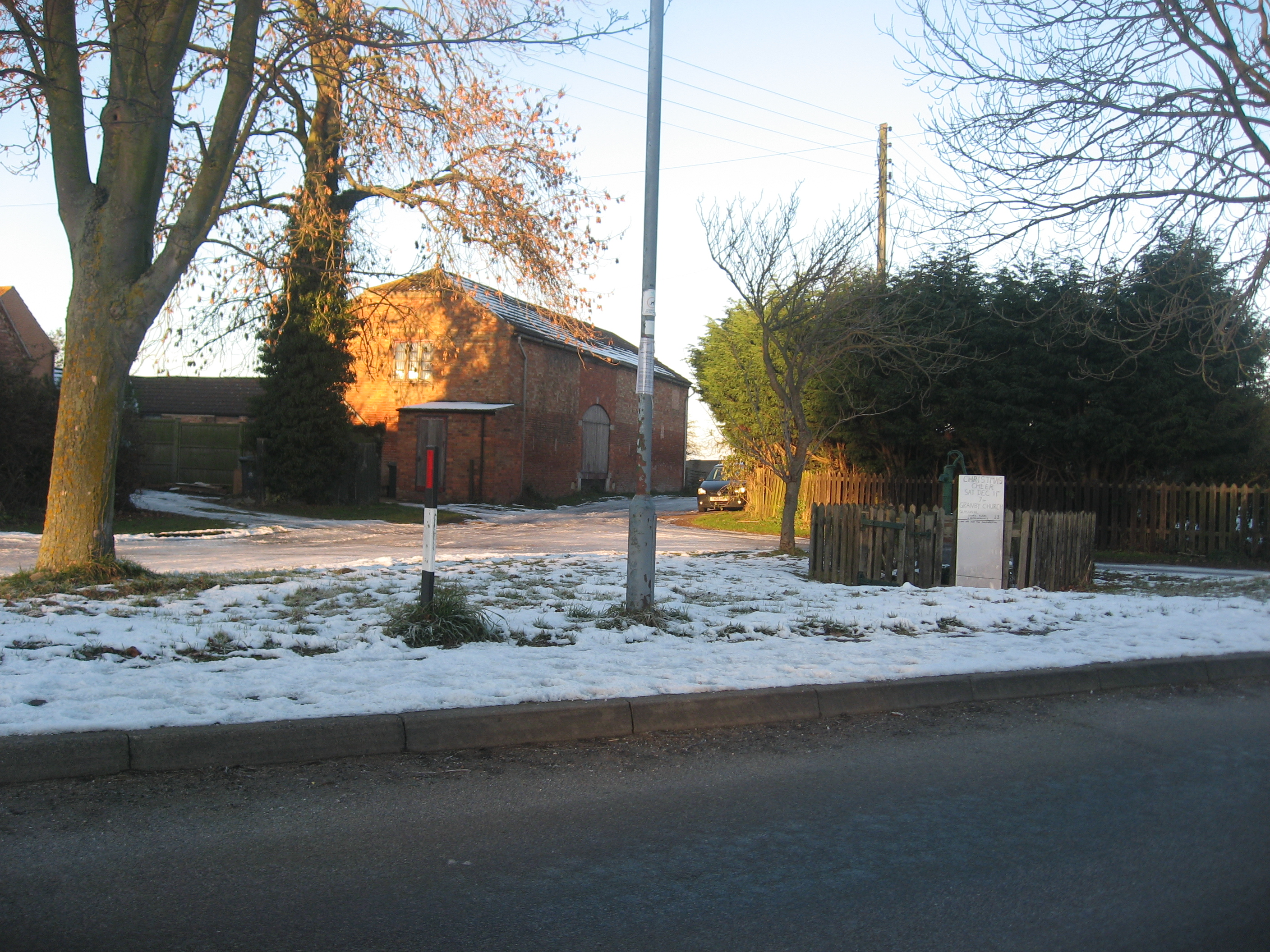
Sutton village green

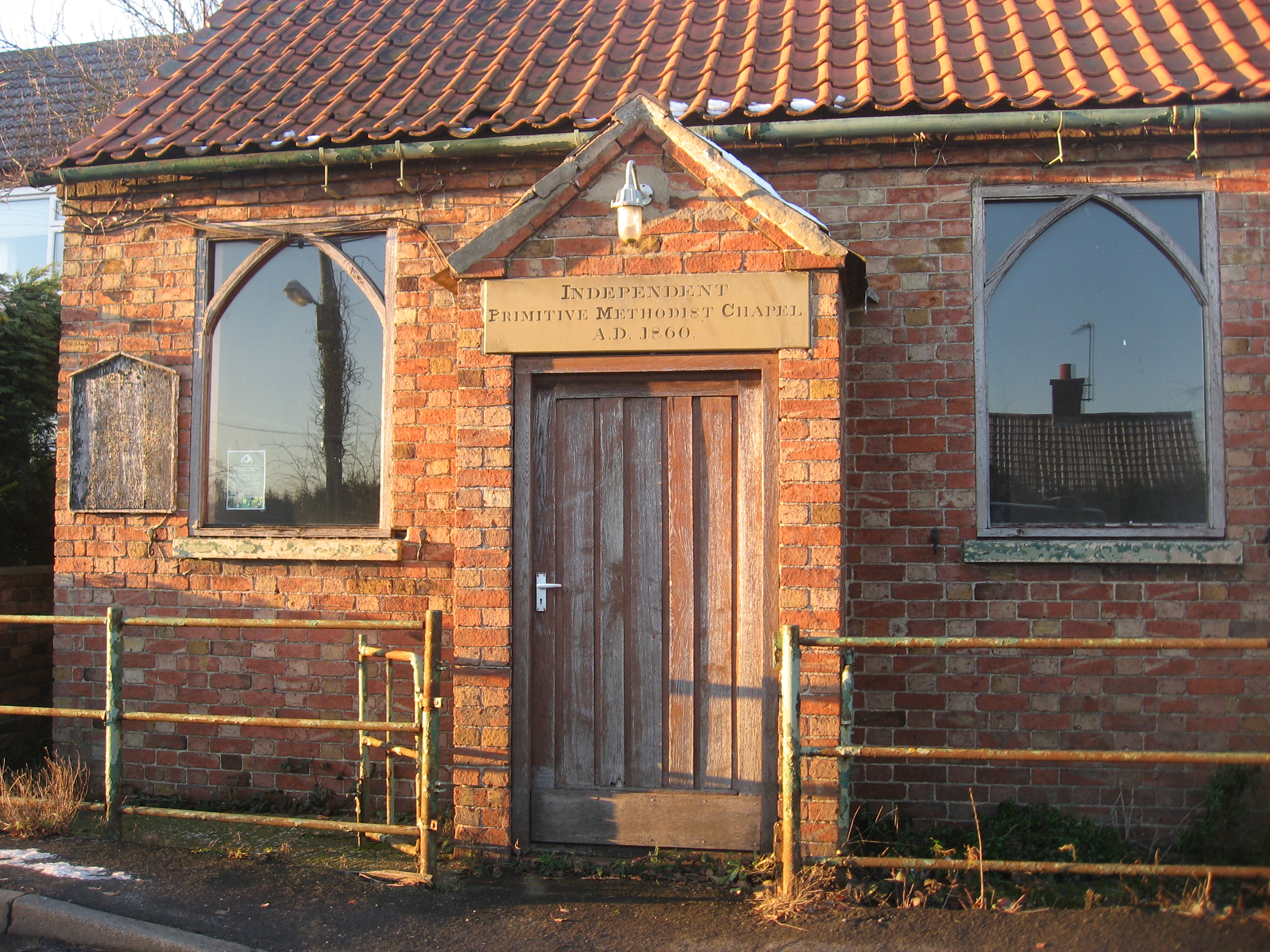
Sutton Chapel

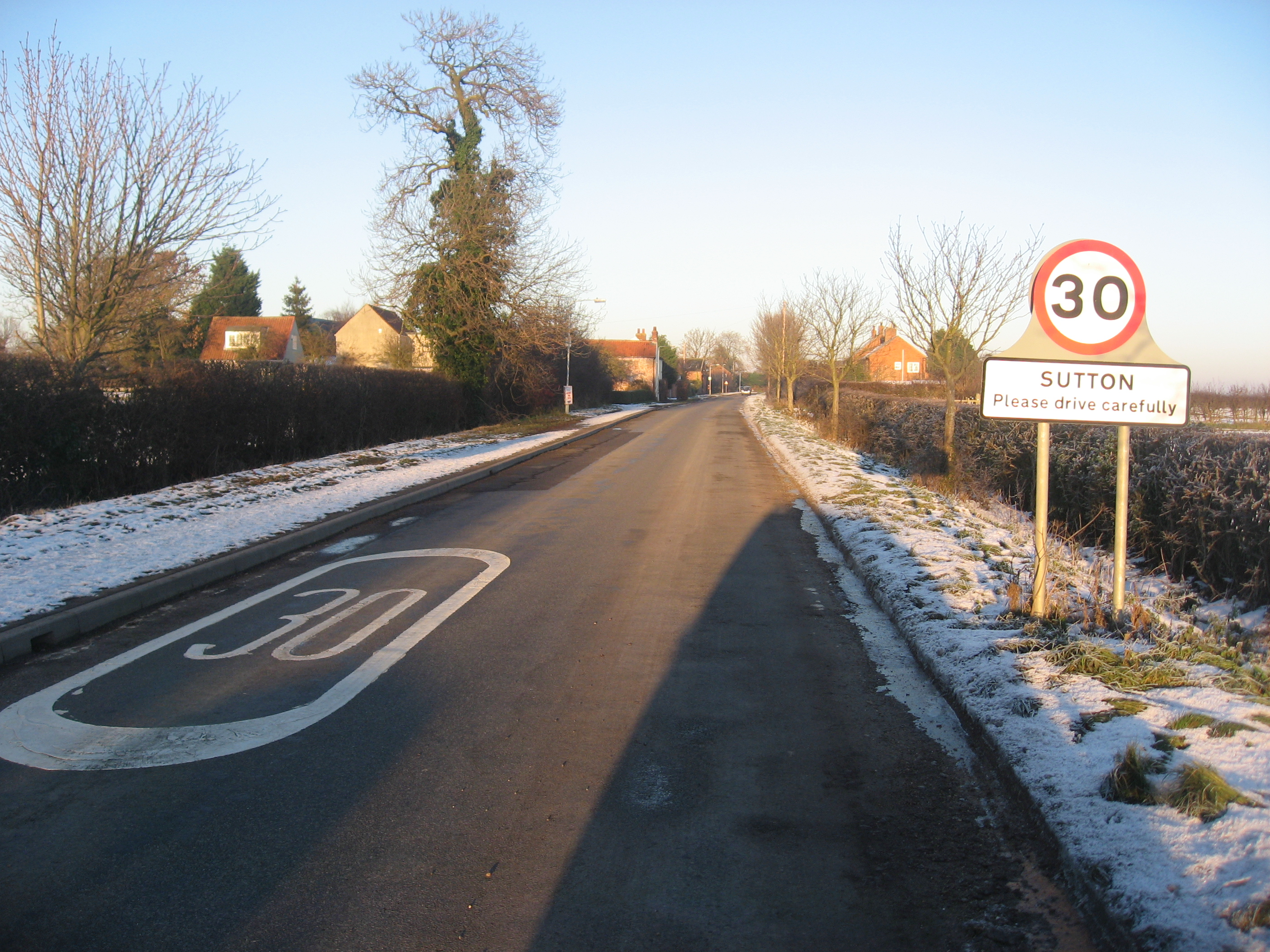
View of Sutton from Granby Lane
