= Sutton Wick =

Hamlet in Oxfordshire, England

Coordinates: 51.6473°N 1.3077°W

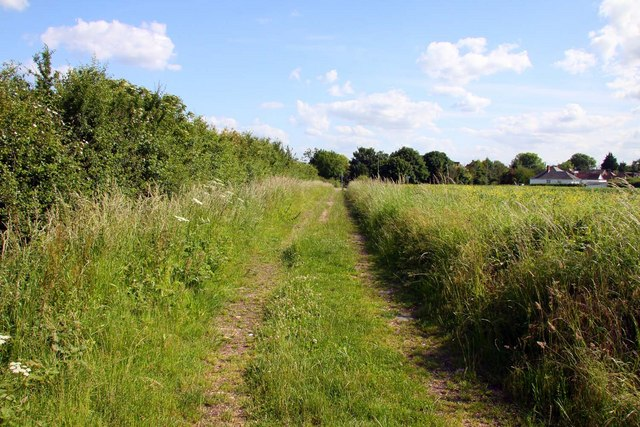
- Bridleway to Sutton Wick

- Location within Oxfordshire
- OS grid reference: SU480945
- Civil parish: Drayton
- District: Vale of White Horse
- Shire county: Oxfordshire
- Region: South East
- Country: England
- Sovereign state: United Kingdom
- Post town: Abingdon
- Postcode district: OX14
- Dialling code: 01235
- Police: Thames Valley
- Fire: Oxfordshire
- Ambulance: South Central
- UK Parliament: Wantage
- Website: Drayton near Abingdon

Sutton Wick is a hamlet contiguous with the village of Drayton, in the Vale of White Horse district, in the county of Oxfordshire, England. It was part of Berkshire until the 1974 boundary changes transferred it to Oxfordshire.

== Governance ==
Sutton Wick was formerly a township in the parish of Sutton Courtenay, in 1866 Sutton Wick became a separate civil parish, on 1 April 1934 the parish was abolished and merged with Drayton, Abingdon and Sutton Courtenay. In 1931 the parish had a population of 267.

== Air crash ==
A Blackburn Beverley C.Mk 1 heavy transport aircraft on a flight from RAF Abingdon crashed at Sutton Wick on 5 March 1957. All but four of the 22 people aboard were killed in the accident, and two people were killed on the ground.
