= Flowers (name) =

Flowers is a surname. Notable people with the surname include:

- Aaron Flowers (born 2006), American football player
- A. D. Flowers (1917–2001), American visual effects artist
- Adam Flowers, American singer
- Adrian Flowers (1926–2016), British photographer
- Aiden Flowers (born 2004), American model
- Alfred K. Flowers (born 1947), United States Air Force officer
- Angela Flowers (1932–2023), British gallerist
- Ben Flowers (1927–2009), American baseball player
- Bernie Flowers (1930–2011), American footballer
- Bess Flowers (1898–1984), American actress
- Betty Sue Flowers, American academic and writer
- Bill Flowers (artist) (born 1963), Australian artist
- Bob Flowers (1917–1962), American footballer
- Brandon Flowers (born 1981), American singer and musician
- Brandon Flowers (American football) (born 1986), American football player
- Brian Flowers, Baron Flowers (1924–2010), British physicist
- Bruce Flowers (born 1957), American basketball player
- Buck Flowers (1899–1983), American footballer
- Charlie Flowers (1937–2014), American football player
- Chipman L. Flowers, Jr. (born 1974), American politician
- Christine Flowers (born 1960), American singer and actor
- Curtis Flowers (born 1970), American alleged murderer
- Dallis Flowers (born 1997), American football player
- Dick Flowers (1927–2010), American football player
- Dickie Flowers (1850–1892), American baseball player
- Dimitri Flowers (born 1996), American football player
- Danny Flowers (born 1948), American musician
- Don Flowers (1908–1968), American cartoonist
- Edwin F. Flowers (1930–2022), American lawyer, judge, and civil servant
- Ereck Flowers (born 1994), American football player
- Erik Flowers (born 1978), American football player
- Frank E. Flowers (born 1979), Caymanian filmmaker
- Frederick Flowers (1810–1886), English police magistrate
- Gennifer Flowers (born 1950), American model and actress
- George Flowers (politician) (1879–1958), Australian politician
- George Flowers (footballer) (1907–1991), English footballer
- George French Flowers (1811–1872), English composer
- Grandmaster Flowers (died 1992), American disc jockey
- H. H. Flowers (1865–1945), American politician
- Herbie Flowers (1938–2024), English musician
- J. Christopher Flowers (born 1957), American investor
- Jacob Flowers, 19th century American settler
- Jackie Flowers (born 1958), American football player
- Jake Flowers (1902–1962), American baseball player
- Jason Flowers (born 1975), British rugby player and coach
- Jewel Flowers (1923–2006), American model
- John Flowers (disambiguation), multiple people
- Keith Flowers (1930–1993), American football player
- Kendal Flowers (died 2012), Belizean shooting victim
- Kenny Flowers (born 1964), American football player
- Kim Flowers, American actress
- Lannie Flowers, American musician
- Larry Flowers (disambiguation), multiple people
- Lethon Flowers (born 1973), American football player
- Malik Flowers (born 1999), American football player
- Marquis Flowers (born 1992), American football player
- Mary E. Flowers (born 1951), American politician
- Michael Flowers (disambiguation), multiple people
- Ness Flowers, Welsh rugby player
- Nina Flowers (born 1974), Puerto Rican drag queen, disc jockey and make-up artist
- Pam Flowers (born 1946), American adventurer, speaker and author who has led sled-dog expeditions to the Arctic.
- Pat Flowers (musician) (1917–2000), American jazzer
- Paul Flowers (banker) (born 1950), English politician, minister and banker
- Paul Flowers (footballer) (born 1974), English footballer
- Percy Flowers (1903–1982), American farmer and alcohol producer
- Quinton Flowers (born 1994), American football player
- R. Barri Flowers (born 1956), American author
- Richmond Flowers (disambiguation), multiple people
- Robert B. Flowers, United States Army officer
- Robert Lee Flowers (1870–1951), American university administrator
- Ron Flowers (1934–2021), English footballer
- Ron Flowers (American football), American football coach
- Ruth Flowers (1931–2014), British disc jockey
- Sibby Flowers (born 1963), American weightlifter
- Stephanie Flowers (born c. 1953), American politician
- Stephen Flowers (born 1953), American writer
- Tairia Flowers (born 1981), American softballer
- Thomas Flowers (disambiguation):
  - Tommy Flowers (1905–1998), British engineer
  - Thomas Flowers (cricketer, born 1988), English cricketer
  - Thomas Flowers (cricketer, born 1868) (1868–1939), English cricketer and umpire
  - Thomas Flowers (born 1967), vocalist and guitarist with Oleander
- Thomas Harold Flowers (1905–1998), British engineer
- Tiger Flowers (1895–1927), American boxer
- Tim Flowers (born 1967), English goalkeeper
- Tommy Flowers (1905–1998), British engineer and computer designer
- Tre Flowers (born 1995), American football player
- Trentyn Flowers (born 2005), American basketball player
- Tyler Flowers (born 1986), American baseball player
- Vic Flowers, English cricket supporter
- Vivian Flowers (born c. 1969), American politician
- Vonetta Flowers (born 1973), American bobsledder
- Walter Flowers (1933–1984), American politician
- Wayland Flowers (1939–1988), American puppeteer
- Wes Flowers (1913–1988), American baseball player
- Wilfred Flowers (1856–1926), English cricketer
- Woodie Flowers (1943–2019), American engineer
- Zay Flowers (born 2000), American football player

== See also ==
- Fleur (given name)
- Flora (disambiguation)
- Flora (surname)
- Flower (name)
