= Paul Flowers =

Paul Flowers may refer to:

- Paul Flowers (banker) (born 1950), former businessman, church minister and bank chairman
- Paul Flowers (footballer) (born 1974), English former footballer

== See also ==
- Flowers (name)
- Flower (name)
