= Flora (given name) =

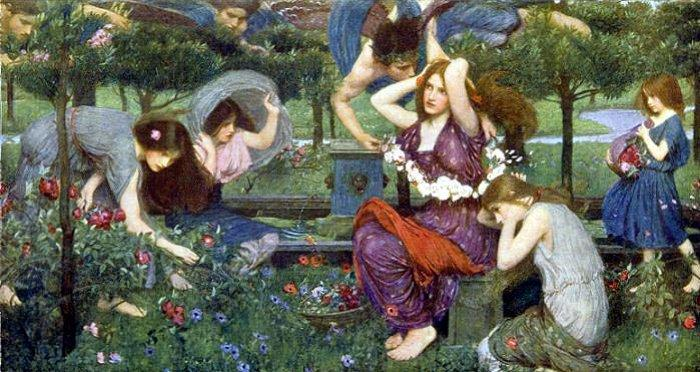
- “Flora and the Zephyrs” by John William Waterhouse.
- Gender: Feminine

Origin
- Origin: Latin
- Meaning: flower

Other names
- Related names: Fflur, Fionnaghal, Fionnuala, Fiore, Fiorenza, Fleur, Flo, Flor, Flòraidh, Flore, Florence, Florencia, Florentina, Florette, Florinda, Florrie, Flossie

Flora is a feminine given name of Latin origin meaning flower, ultimately derived from the Latin word flos, which had the genitive floris. Flora was a fertility goddess of flowers and springtime in Ancient Rome. Flora is also a feminine form of the Roman name Florus, which is derived from the same source.

Feminine variants include Florrie or its Scottish Gaelic equivalent Flòraidh. Flora was also used as an English translation for the etymologically unrelated Scottish Gaelic Fionnaghal, a variant of the Irish Gaelic name Fionnuala.

Other feminine variants include the Dutch Floor and Floortje, the English and French Florence, the French Fleur, Flore, and Florette, the Hungarian Flóra, the Italian Fiore and Fiorenza, the Occitan Flòra, the Sami Florá, the Portuguese and Spanish Flor and Florinda, the Spanish Florencia, and the Portuguese Florência, and the Welsh Fflur.

== Usage ==
The name came into regular use by the 1700s in countries across Europe and elsewhere. The name was among the one hundred most popular names for girls in the United States in the late 1800s and early 1900s and remained among the top one thousand names used for girls through 1972 and then declined. It has again risen in use in recent years and has been among the one thousand most used names for American girls since 2019. It is among the top 150 names for newborn girls in Canada, where it ranked 124th on the popularity chart in 2021, with 211 uses. It is also in regular use in the United Kingdom, France, and Hungary.

== Notable people ==
- Flora A. Brewster (1852-1919), American physician, surgeon
- Flora Bridges (1859–1912), American college professor
- Flora Brovina (1949–2026), Kosovar poet and pediatrician
- Flora Carabella (1926–1999), Italian actress
- Flora Chan (born 1970), Hong Kong actress
- Flora Coquerel (born 1994), French model
- Flora Adams Darling (1840–1910), American author and clubwoman
- Flora D. Darpino (born 1961), American judge advocate general
- Flora Eldershaw (1897–1956), Australian writer
- Flora Duffy (born 1987), Bermudian professional triathlete
- Flora Frate (born 1983), Italian politician
- Flora Kaai Hayes (1893–1968), Hawaiian politician
- Flora Karimova (born 1941), Azerbaijani singer
- Flora Kong (born 1984), Hong Kong former swimmer
- Flora Haines Loughead (1855–1943), American writer, farmer, miner
- Flora Hommel (1928–2015), American childbirth educator
- Flora Largo (born 1974), Bolivian politician
- Flora E. Lowry (1879–1933), American anthologist
- Flora MacDonald (1722–1790), Scottish Jacobite
- Flora MacDonald (1926–2015), Canadian politician
- Flora Mace (born 1949), American glass artist
- Flora Martínez (born 1977), Colombian actress
- Flora Martirosian (1957–2012), Armenian singer
- Flóra Molnár (born 1998), Hungarian swimmer
- Flora Montgomery (born 1974), British actress
- Flora Murray (1869–1923), British doctor and suffragette
- Flora Nwapa (1931–1993), Nigerian author
- Flora Peel (born 1996), English field hockey player
- Flora Purim (born 1942), Brazilian singer
- Flora Redoumi (born 1976), Greek hurdler
- Flora Robson (1902–1984), British actress
- Flora Madeline Shaw (1864–1927), Canadian nurse and nursing teacher
- Flora Annie Steel (1847–1929), British writer
- Flora Stevenson (1839–1905), British educational reformer
- Flora E. Strout (1867-1962), American teacher, social reformer
- Flora Tabanelli (born 2007), Italian freestyle skier
- Flora Thompson (1876–1947), British writer
- Flora Tristan (1803–1844), French writer and feminist
- Flora Twort (1893–1985), British painter
- Flora Ugwunwa (born 1984), Nigerian Paralympic athlete
- Flora Vautier (born 2004), French para table tennis player
- Flora Wovschin (born 1924, disappeared 1945), American missing person

== Fictional characters ==
- Flora, one of the three good fairies in the 1959 Disney animated film Sleeping Beauty
- Flora, in the Italian television series Winx Club
- Flora Reinhold, in the video game series Professor Layton

== See also ==
- Flora (surname)
- Flora (disambiguation)
- Flore (given name)
- Fleur (given name)
- Floortje
- Flower (name), a surname and given name
- Flowers (name), a surname
- Tzitzak, Khazar princess and Byzantine Empress whose name meant "flower"
