= John Flower =

John Flower may refer to:

- John Flower (sheriff) (1535–1620), MP for Rutland
- John Flower (MP), MP for Maldon 1406, 1411, 1414
- John Flower (theologian) (c. 1624–after 1658), English nonconformist theologian
- John Flower (artist) (1793–1861), English landscape artist
- John Flower (cricketer) (born 1938), English cricketer
- John Beresford Fowler (1906–1977), English interior designer.

== See also ==
- John Flowers (disambiguation)
