= Flor (given name) =

Flor is a unisex given name and nickname. It may refer to:

- Flor (drag queen), Guatemalan-New Zealand drag performer
- Flor (singer) (born 1984), Argentine pop and rock singer Florencia "Flor" Caserta
- Flor Alpaerts (1876–1954), Belgian conductor, pedagogue and composer
- Flor Colón (born 1969), Dominican retired volleyball player
- Flor Contemplacion (1953–1995), Filipino domestic worker whose execution in Singapore for murder created much unrest
- Flor Delgadillo Ruiz (born 1973), Colombian road cyclist
- Flor Isava Fonseca (1921–2020), Venezuelan sportswoman and writer
- Flor Joosen (born 1952), Belgian businessman
- Flor María Chalbaud (1921–2013), Venezuelan First Lady
- Flor Alba Núñez Vargas (1990–2015), murdered Colombian journalist
- Flor Peeters (1903–1986), Belgian composer, organist and teacher
- Flor Ruiz (born 1991), Colombian javelin thrower
- Flor Silvester (1923–2008), Dutch graphic designer, illustrator, painter and sculptor
- Flor Silvestre (born 1930), stage name of Mexican singer, actress and equestrienne Guillermina Jiménez Chabolla
- Flor Velázquez (born 1984), Venezuelan judoka

== See also ==
- Flore (given name)
