= Fflu =

Fflur is a Welsh name meaning "flower". It can be used as both a given name and a surname.

People with the surname include:

- Elin Fflur, Welsh singer and songwriter

People with the given name include:

- Fflur, legendary Welsh maiden abducted by Cassivellaunus
- Fflur Dafydd, Welsh novelist, singer-songwriter and musician

Places with the name include:

- Ystrad Fflur, a hamlet and community in Ceredigion

== See also ==
- Flora (given name)
