= Charles Flowers =

Charles Flowersmay refer to:

- Dickie Flowers (Charles Richard Flowers, 1850–1892), American baseball player
- Wes Flowers (Charles Wesley Flowers, 1913–1988), American baseball player
- Charlie Flowers (1937–2014), American football player
- Charlie Flowers (politician) (born 1939), American politician in South Dakota

== See also ==
- Charles Flower (disambiguation)
- Flowers (surname)
