= Charles Flower =

Charles Flower may refer to:

- Charles Edward Flower (1830–1892), English brewer
- Sir Charles Flower, 1st Baronet (c. 1763–1834), mayor of London

== See also ==
- Charles Flowers (disambiguation)
- Flower (surname)
