= John M. Moore =

John M. Moore may refer to:

- John Mackenzie Moore (1857–1930), Canadian architect
- John Marks Davenport Moore (1811–1892), member of the Texas House of Representatives, mayor of Corpus Christi, uncle of John Marks Moore
- John Marks Moore (1853–1902), member of the Texas House of Representatives, Secretary of State of Texas
- John Matthew Moore (1862–1940), member of the Texas House of Representatives, U.S. congressman
- John Moore (Methodist bishop) (1867–1948), American Methodist bishop
- John Moore (footballer, born February 1943) (1943–2009), English footballer
