= Flore (given name) =

Flore is a feminine given name. Notable persons with that name include:

- Flore Bois Gaillard, 18th-century St. Lucian revolutionary
- Flore Enyegue (born 1991), Cameroonian footballer
- Flore Gravesteijn (born 1987), Dutch volleyball player
- Flore Hazoumé (born 1959), Congolese writer
- Flore Levine-Cousyns (1898-1989), Belgian pianist
- Flore Maltine Ramarozatovo, Malagasy politician
- Flore Revalles (1889-1966), Swiss singer, dancer and actress
- Flore Vandenhoucke (born 1995), Belgian badminton player
- Flore Vasseur (born 1973), French filmmaker, novelist, journalist and entrepreneur
- Flore Zoé (born 1975), Dutch photographer

== See also ==
- Flor (given name)
- Flora (given name)
