= Michael Flower =

Michael Flower may refer to:

- Michael A. Flower (born 1956), American classicist and historian
- Michael "Mick Flower, English musician with the Vibracathedral Orchestra
- Michael Llowarch Warburton Flower, 11th Viscount Ashbrook (born 1935), an aristocrat in the Peerage of Ireland

== See also ==
- Michael Flowers
