= Fleur (given name) =

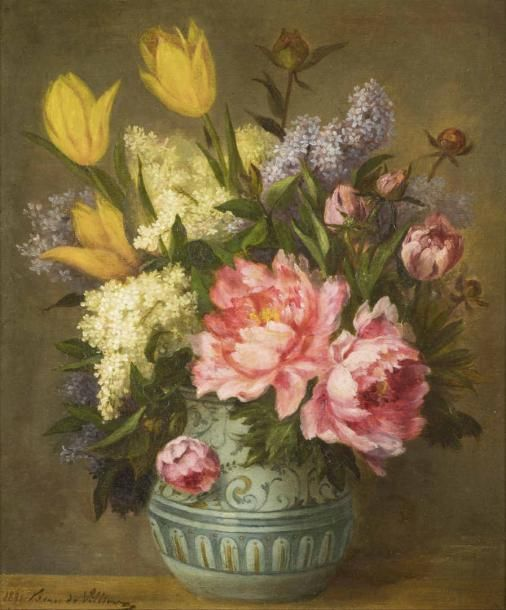
- Painting of a bouquet of flowers
- Pronunciation: [flœʁ] /ˌflɜːr/
- Gender: Female
- Language: French, English, Dutch

Origin
- Meaning: Flower

Fleur is a feminine given name originated in France, eventually used in English speaking countries and other languages. It means "flower" in French.

== Notable people ==
- Fleur Adcock (1934–2024), New Zealand poet and editor
- Fleur Agema (born 1976), Dutch politician
- Fleur Anderson (born 1971), British Labour politician
- Fleur Beale (born 1945), New Zealand teenage fiction writer
- Fleur Bennett (born 1970), British television actress
- Fleur Cowles (1908–2009), American writer and editor
- Fleur East (born 1987), British singer and contestant on The X Factor
- Fleur Ezekiel (fl.1959), Indian model, first Indian Miss World contestant
- Fleur Faure (born 1993), French cyclist
- Fleur Hassan-Nahoum (born 1973), Israeli politician
- Fleur Jaeggy (born 1940), Swiss writer (in Italian)
- Fleur van de Kieft (born 1973), Dutch field hockey player
- Fleur Lombard (1974–1996), British firefighter and first female firefighter to die on duty in peacetime
- Fleur Maxwell (born 1988), Luxembourgian figure skater
- Fleur McIntyre (born 1979), Australian basketball player and coach
- Fleur Mellor (born 1936), Australian track and field runner and Olympic champion
- Fleur Pellerin (born 1973), French politician
- Fleur Revell (born 1972), New Zealand journalist
- Fleur Savelkoel (born 1995), Dutch volleyball player
- Fleur Saville (born 1984), New Zealand television actress
- Fleur Tashjian, British child actress
- Fleur van Eeden (born 1983), South African stunt performer
- Fleur van der Weel (born 1970), Dutch illustrator

== Fictional characters ==
- Fleur Delacour, character in the Harry Potter series
- Fleur Forsyte, a character in The Forsyte Saga
- Fleur Blanc, a character in Eureka Seven: AO
- The Groovy Girls doll line, by Manhattan Toy, includes a doll named Fleur.

== See also ==
- Flower (name), surname and given name
- Flowers (name), surname
- Flora (given name)
- Tzitzak, Khazar princess and Byzantine Empress whose name meant "flower"
