= John Flowers =

John Flowers may refer to:

- Jackie Flowers (born 1958), American football player
- John Flowers (cricketer) (1882–1968), English cricketer
- Johnny Flowers (fl. 1940s), American baseball player
- John Flowers (footballer) (born 1944), English footballer
- John Flowers (politician) (born 1954), Australian politician
- John Flowers (basketball) (born 1989), American basketball player

== See also ==
- John Flower (disambiguation)
