= Thomas Flowers =

Thomas Flowers may refer to:

- Tommy Flowers (1905–1998), British engineer
- Thomas Flowers (cricketer, born 1988), English cricketer
- Thomas Flowers (cricketer, born 1868) (1868–1939), English cricketer and umpire
- Thomas Flowers (born 1967), vocalist and guitarist with Oleander
