= Floortje =

Floortje and Floor are Dutch versions of the feminine given name Flora. People with the name include:

Floortje

- Floortje Dessing (born 1970), Dutch radio and television presenter, producer and travel writer
- Floortje Engels (born 1982), Dutch field hockey player
- Floortje Mackaij (born 1995), Dutch road racing cyclist
- Floortje Meijners (born 1987), Dutch volleyball player
- Floortje Smit (born 1983), Dutch pop singer
- Floortje Zwigtman (born 1974), Dutch children's book writer

Floor

- Floor van den Brandt (born 1990), Dutch speed skater
- Floor Jansen (born 1981), Dutch singer, songwriter, and vocal coach
- Floor Van Der Meulen (born 1989), Dutch film director
- Floor Spaan (born 2003), Dutch footballer

Floor is also a now less common short form of the Dutch male given name Floris (or Florentianus, Florentinus, Florentius). For example:

- Floor Wibaut (1859–1936), Dutch businessman and politician
- Floor de Zeeuw (1898–1979), Dutch footballer and football coach
