= Battle of Mapperley Hills =

1842 incident in the Nottingham, England, area

Coordinates: 52°58′34.20″N 1°8′8.51″W

The Battle of Mapperley Hills was an incident on Tuesday 23 August 1842, which marked the culmination of several days of Chartist disturbances in the Nottingham area. Troops and police broke up an assembly of about five thousand people and arrested four hundred when they refused to disperse. The site of the assembly and "the battle" may have been in Mapperley Hills Common, close to where Ransom Road (formerly Coppice Road) meets Woodborough Road. The Common, of 54 acres, and the adjoining Coppice of the Hunger Hills (124 acres) were open to the inhabitants of Nottingham, but owned by Nottingham Corporation as lord of the manor.

The term "battle" may have been popularised by a long poem about the event, which appeared in the Nottingham Review a month later on 23 September. The poem, called "The Battle of Mapperley Hills", while pouring scorn on the authorities and the militia, was, ironically prefaced; 'is respectfully dedicated to the Magistrates ...'

The disturbances began on Thursday 18 August when a resolution to cease work "until the document known as the People's Charter of 1838 became the law of the land" was adopted in Nottingham Market Place by a meeting of more than two thousand. The magistrates saw this as a dangerous turn of events and decided that no further meetings were to be allowed. On Friday the 19th there were attempts at meetings, a reading of the Riot Act and various minor encounters with the police across the town. On Saturday the 20th, Chartists unsuccessfully attempted to persuade workers at New Radford to strike. A group of about five hundred on their way to Radford Colliery encountered troops of the 2nd Dragoon Guards and fled across the fields. About one hundred and forty were captured and marched off to the Cavalry Barracks; thirty-nine were committed by the magistrates to the County Gaol and the others released. On Monday the 22nd several hundred Chartists proceeded north along Mansfield Road and joined at Sherwood with some two thousand framework-knitters from the villages. The military and magistrates soon arrived and there was a "general flight over hedge and ditch"; just two of the Chartists were captured.

On Tuesday the 23rd the town of Nottingham was peaceful until 3 p.m., when news arrived that Chartists from Hucknall, Bulwell, Arnold, Basford and other places were gathering on Mapperley Hills. The Chartists may have thought that, following a successful gathering in Calverton four weeks earlier, they had more chance of an undisturbed rally, if they met outside the town of Nottingham. However, the 2nd Dragoon Guards (nicknamed the Queen's Bays) were called out and, accompanied by police, they found several thousand demonstrators assembled. Although they were "quietly sitting down on the grass preparing to eat their dinner" they were ordered to disperse, and when this did not happen, the magistrate, Colonel Rolleston, directed that a number of them should be arrested, and about four hundred were detained. A witness later recalled that he had seen the "battle" from a point in town, above the Park Tunnel, looking north-east across Derby Road: "There was a great gathering of horse soldiers busy in dispersing the people, and their swords, flashing in the sun, shone like dazzling stars from this point of vantage in the Park."

According to contemporary reports, those arrested were marched four abreast down Woodborough Road (formerly Mapperley Hills Road) and from there along Redcliffe Road (formerly Red Lane) to the Mansfield road. At this point, a mob attacked the police and military with a volley of stones. At the top of York Street just before arrival at the Nottingham House of Correction, there was another mêlée. The Dragoon Guards cleared the streets by galloping about and brandishing their swords. By 4 pm, all the prisoners were within the town jail. Later in the afternoon about two hundred and fifty were released, on entering into their own recognizances of £5 each, to keep the peace for twelve months. About fifty of the rest were committed for trial and arraigned before Colonel Rolleston at the Quarter Sessions. All were found guilty and some were sentenced to imprisonment with hard labour for six, four or two months and the rest were discharged upon entering into recognizances to keep the peace.

The "battle" was perhaps the high point of this phase of Chartism in Nottinghamshire, as the working class then began to focus instead on opposition to the Corn Laws and the high price of bread.

== See also ==
- 1842 General Strike
- 1842 Pottery Riots
