= Trish Kissiar-Knight =

American volleyball coach

Coaching career (HC unless noted)
- 2009–2010: Texas Tech

Trish Kissiar-Knight is a former head coach of the Texas Tech Red Raiders volleyball team. Knight replaced Nancy Todd who resigned on December 1, 2008. After Kissiar-Knight's departure, Don Flora became the new head coach on January 7, 2011.
