= Mapperley =

Area of north-eastern Nottingham, England

Coordinates: 52.984°N 1.122°W

- Suburb
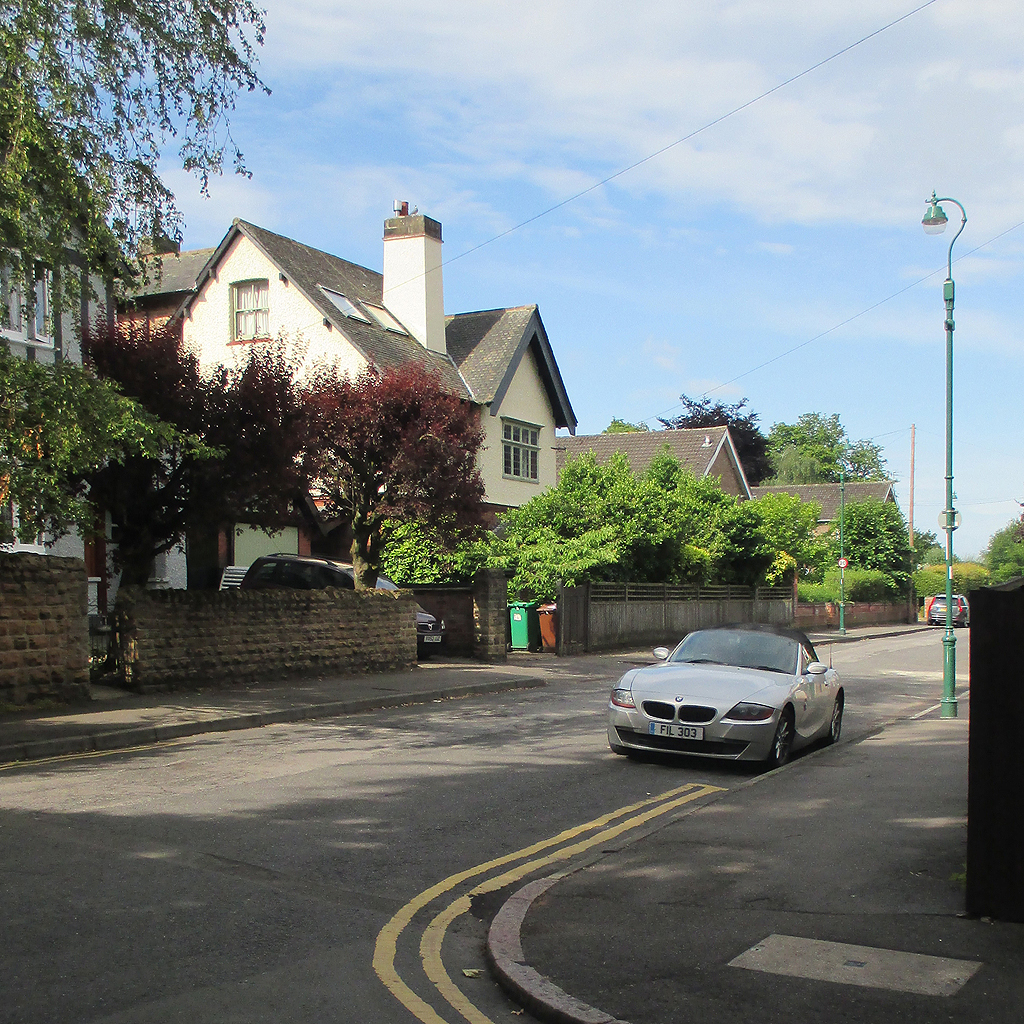
- St Andrews Road

- Location within Nottinghamshire
- Population: 15,846 (ward. 2011)
- OS grid reference: SK 58938 43357
- District: City of Nottingham & Borough of Gedling
- Shire county: Nottinghamshire
- Region: East Midlands
- Country: England
- Sovereign state: United Kingdom
- Post town: NOTTINGHAM
- Postcode district: NG3
- Dialling code: 0115
- Police: Nottinghamshire
- Fire: Nottinghamshire
- Ambulance: East Midlands
- UK Parliament: Gedling and Nottingham East

Mapperley is a suburb, residential and commercial area of north-eastern Nottingham, England. The area is bounded by Sherwood to the north-west, Thorneywood to the south and Gedling to the east.

== History ==
At various periods the terms 'Mapperley' and 'Mapperley Plains' have been applied to lands, on either side of Woodborough Road (B684), from a point at the junction of Mapperley Road, north-east for a distance of some 3 3/4 miles (6.0 km), to that point where the road forks towards Woodborough village. The stretch of Woodborough Road from Mapperley Road to Porchester Road is called 'Mapperley Plains' on Jackson's map of 1851–66, for example. This section considers the history of the suburb within the present day city boundary.

The origins of the city of Nottingham suburb called Mapperley seem to be found in the fourteenth century. Writing in the 1670s about lands in the lordship of Basford (i.e. west of present-day Woodborough Road) which were called cornerswong, Dr Robert Thoroton, notes:

In the time of Richard the second (reigned 1377–99), Thomas Mapurley was a considerable man at Nottingham…. He, or his posterity, became possessed of the chiefest part of these grounds, which was the occasion of them being called Maperley's Closes; and since there being a cottage-house or two, and some odd barns erected, it goes for a small Hamlet called Mapurley.

Early in his career, Thomas Mapperley (or Mapurley) had been known by the name Thomas Holt of Mapperley, Derbyshire, but he changed his surname to the place of his origin, and it was after him that the suburb was subsequently named. He was under-sheriff of Nottinghamshire from about 1387 to 1391, during which time he was returned as MP for Nottingham in 1388 and 1391. He was mayor of the town in 1402-3 and recorder 1407–10.

In the late 16th and early 17th centuries, Thoroton mentions lands in 'Maperley Closes' being in the possession of members of families called Staples, Querneby and Blyth (q.v.). Bankes' Crown Survey of 1609 has 'Five closes of pasture called Mapperley lying between Basford Waste and Nottingham Lordship in the occupation of Thomas Blithe, freeholder' and 'two other closes of pasture next thereunto adjoining the one called Mapperley in the occupation of Robert Staples, freeholder'. By the early 17th century it seems that what was known as 'Mapperley' was Mapperley Hills Common, a narrow strip of land, shown on Bankes' map, all to the east of Mapperley Hills Road (present day Woodborough Road), which began about where Alexandra Court now stands and continued northeast, ending close to the top of present-day Porchester Road. It measured about 1.7 kilometres (1.1 miles) long and from only 80 metres (260 ft) to 200 metres (660 ft) wide.

An advertisement of 1772 in the Nottingham Journal announced:

To be sold to the highest bidder… A compact freehold estate called Mapperley situated in the parish of Basford, within one mile of Nottingham, consisting of two messuage houses, and 18 closes of rich meadow and pasture land adjoining thereto, and lying within a ring fence, containing 88 acres [36 hectares] and upwards. There are also 12 acres [4.9 hectares] of arable land to the said estate, as its proportion of break from the Forest. Mapperley is a very pleasant situation, near Sherwood Forest, in a fine sporting country and is entitled to a common right, without stint on the said Forest.

— Nottingham Journal

To judge from the land awarded as a result of the Basford Inclosure Act 1792 (32 Geo. 3. c. 67 Pr.), 'Mapperley', at this time, meant all that area bounded by Redcliffe Road, Mansfield Road, Private Road and Woodborough Road. It is thought that the banker, John Smith, bought the advertised Mapperley estate. He died in 1776, leaving three daughters, one of whom, Mary, married Thomas Wright, and so the estate became the property of the Wright family. In the 1790s Ichabod Wright (1767–1862) built Mapperley Hall at the heart of the estate. In 1873 Ichabod's grandson, Colonel Charles Ichabod Wright began to sell land due south of the Hall and grounds; a plot bounded by Woodborough Road, the upper portion of Magdala Road and Lucknow Drive, intended for six houses.

The greater part of the Mapperley estate was only released for development in 1903. On 20 March of that year, the northern side of the estate was put up for auction, its 130 acres being described as a 'picturesque and finely timbered park'. At the auction the Wrights sold it for £74,500 to a group that included a well known local architect, William Beedham Starr, who wasted no time in submitting a detailed development plan to Nottingham Corporation for a series of streets to be set out on the land. Between 1906 and 1914 around 163 houses received planning consent in Mapperley Park, mostly in the northern area.

The land on which the area of Alexandra Park now stands was originally a part of Mapperley Hills Common (q.v. above). Following the St. Mary's Nottingham Inclosure Act 1845 (8 & 9 Vict. c. 7 Pr.) the land in this area was sold into private ownership, eventually falling into the possession of Jonathan and Benjamin Hine in the 1850s. They engaged their brother, the celebrated local architect Thomas C. Hine to lay out the area and design the substantial houses that now define the character of the area. Enderleigh was one of the four earliest developed of these houses, the others being Femleigh, Springfield House and Sunnyholme (now Trent House). These houses were built for some of the wealthiest figures within Nottingham at the time. Following the construction of these early houses Alexandra Park continued to develop as an exclusive residential area and does still retain something of this reputation.

Developments further north, along the east side of Woodborough Road started later and by 1881 there were about forty buildings, beyond Alexandra Park, stretching as far as the city's new boundary. Two new public houses appear around this time, the Duke of Cambridge and the Belle Vue, and there were two new streets, Blyth Street and Querneby Road, with houses beginning to be built from about 1900. Over the next twenty years there was more building with new streets and houses as far as Porchester Road.

In 1837 a new thoroughfare, Coppice Road (now Ransom Road), was made through the coppice from St Ann's to Mapperley Common. The trees at the side of the road were planted in 1845. The Coppice Hospital on Ransom Drive, was designed by Thomas C. Hine.and built between 1857 and 1859. It was the second asylum to be built in Nottingham, the General Lunatic Asylum being the first, having been constructed at Sneinton Fields, off Carlton Road, in 1812. Mapperley Hospital (the Nottingham Borough Asylum) on Porchester Road was designed by G. T. Hine, son of Thomas C. Hine, and built between 1875 and 1880.

St Jude's on Woodborough Road was opened in 1877, as a daughter church of St Ann's, on land given by the Wright family. A chancel was added in 1893 and north and south aisles in 1916. St Jude's became a separate parish on 9 November 1926.

The Nottingham Borough Extension Act 1877 (40 & 41 Vict. c. xxxi), which expanded the area of Nottingham from 1,996 acres to 10,935 acres, had the effect of bringing a number of settlements in Basford parish into the area of the town; these included Mapperley together with neighbouring Carrington and Sherwood. Before the act, Redcliffe Road (then Red Lane) was the northern extent of the town. After the act, the new boundary ran along Porchester Road to Woodborough Road, north for several hundred yards and then west down Woodthorpe Drive.

Lands alongside the B684, beyond the city boundary as far as the turning for Woodborough, are now commonly called the Mapperley Plains. As the area was once woodland, it may be that the term 'plains' is used here in its sense of an area that has been cleared of trees.

== Geography ==
The main part of Mapperley is at a little over 400 feet (120 metres) above sea level and is the highest area of Nottingham. It is on a long narrow spur (the remnant of a plateau eroded by glacial melt water) that runs SW-NE on a narrow ridge, now topped by Woodborough Road.

Some of the Nottingham region's largest brickworks were formerly on the high ground at Mapperley, as its Keuper marl (now known as Mercia Mudstone), was suitable for brick making. This led to the saying that 'Nottingham once stood on Mapperley Plains', for the area was the source of so many of the town's buildings in the nineteenth century. Victorian Nottingham bricks were once exported to other parts of the country and, it is said that the bricks for St Pancras railway station came from Mapperley.

Mapperley Park is a conservation area and one of Nottingham's most prestigious residential locations, just north of the city centre and noted for its distinguished Victorian and Edwardian properties set along attractive tree lined avenues. Its boundaries are Mapperley Road (south), Mansfield Road (west), Private Road (north) and Woodborough Road (east).

The location known as Mapperley Ridge, at 122 metres above sea level, has a transmitter which broadcasts BBC Radio Nottingham and Capital FM (formerly Trent FM), as well as three DAB digital radio multiplexes (NOW Nottingham, BBC National DAB, and Digital One).

== Politics ==
Mapperley today is represented both on Nottingham City Council and Gedling Borough Council. The current councillors are evenly split: three for the City Ward, who are Labour Party councillors, and three for the borough, who are also Labour Party councillors.

The population of Mapperley Ward (part of Nottingham unitary authority) at the 2011 census was 15,846.

== Education ==
- Mapperley Plains Primary and Nursery School
- Walter Halls Primary and Early Years School
- Westdale Infant School
- Westdale Junior School
- Carlton Digby School (special school providing education for children and young people between the ages of three and eighteen with a wide range of special educational needs)

Other schools:

- Jamia Al-Hudaa
- St Augustine's Catholic Primary School

== Sport ==
A.F.C. Mapperley is an amateur football club that has represented the area since its inception in 2018.

== Bus service ==
Nottingham City Transport

- 25/25B: Nottingham, Carlton Hill, Westdale Lane, Mapperley, Daybrook, Arnold. (25B terminates at Mapperley Shops)
- 60: Nottingham, Woodborough Road, Mapperley, Westdale Lane, Gedling. (Replacing Route 45)
- 61: Nottingham, Woodborough Road, Mapperley, Mapperley Plains, Lambley, Woodborough, Calverton. (Replacing Routes 46/47)

CT4N

- 19: Sherwood Vale, Mapperley, Arnold, Bestwood Park, Top Valley, Bulwell.

Nottingham Minibus & Coaches

- N73: Mapperley, Westdale Lane, Carlton, Netherfield, Victoria Retail Park.

== Notable people ==
- Dave Rowberry (1940–2003), English pianist and organist
- TommyInnit, YouTuber and comedian

== See also ==
- Listed buildings in Nottingham (Mapperley ward)
- St Jude's Church, Mapperley
- Battle of Mapperley Hills
