= Coppice Hospital =

The Coppice Hospital
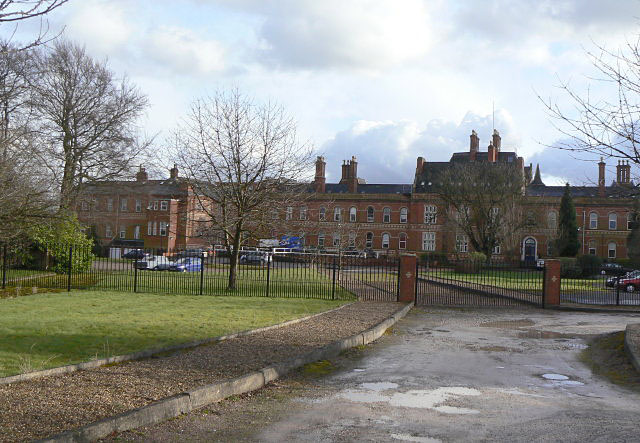
- Entrance to the Coppice Hospital

- Shown in Nottinghamshire

Geography
- Location: Nottingham, England
- Coordinates: 52.9725°N 1.1295°W

Organisation
- Care system: NHS
- Type: Specialist

Services
- Speciality: Mental health

History
- Founded: 1859
- Closed: 1985

Links
- Lists: Hospitals in England

The Coppice Hospital was a mental health facility in Mapperley, Nottingham, England.

== History ==
The hospital, which was designed by Thomas Chambers Hine in the Italianate style using a corridor plan layout, opened as the Coppice Private Asylum in August 1859. Two new wings, designed by George Thomas Hine, the original architect's son, were completed in the 1880s.

Although initially established as a private asylum for fee-paying patients, the facility was owned by the Nottinghamshire County Council and being unable to compete with the state, it joined the National Health Service as the Coppice Hospital in 1948.

After the introduction of Care in the Community in the early 1980s, the hospital went into a period of decline and closed in 1985. The main buildings were subsequently converted into apartments as Hine Hall. Meanwhile, a modern mental health facility known as the Springwood Centre was established near the old hospital, although this has also since closed.
