= Adam Flowers =

American lyric tenor

Adam Flowers is an American lyric tenor who is based in San Francisco, California. Flowers sings major lyric tenor roles in opera houses across the western United States.

Flowers was in the resident company of Opera San José from 2001 until 2006 and appeared there in 22 productions, in many leading roles.

== Performances ==
- Symphony No. 9 (Beethoven) – tenor soloist, Winchester Orchestra conducted by Henry Mollicone
- Roméo et Juliette – Tybalt, Hawaii Opera Theatre
- La bohème – Rodolfo, Opera Idaho
- Così fan tutte – Ferrando, Rimrock Opera
- For West Bay Opera
  - The Merry Widow – Camille de Rosillon
  - Pikovaya Dama – Gherman
  - Macbeth – Macduff
- The Pilgrim's Progress by Ralph Vaughan Williams – Interpreter/Lord Lechery/Mr. By-Ends, Trinity Lyric Opera
- For Opera San José
  - Don Giovanni – Don Ottavio
  - La bohème – Rodolfo
  - Un ballo in maschera – Riccardo
  - The Crucible – Danforth
  - Der fliegende Holländer – Erik
  - Carmen – Don José
  - Tosca – Cavaradossi
  - Die Fledermaus – Eisenstein
  - Les pêcheurs de perles – Nadir
  - Cavalleria rusticana – Turiddu
  - Die Zauberflöte – Tamino
  - Il trovatore – Manrico
  - Faust – Faust
  - Madama Butterfly – Pinkerton
  - Manon – Des Grieux
  - Così fan tutte – Ferrando
  - Falstaff – Fenton
  - L'elisir d'amore – Nemorino
