= Ellen Sulley Fray =

British- American social reformer (1832–1903)

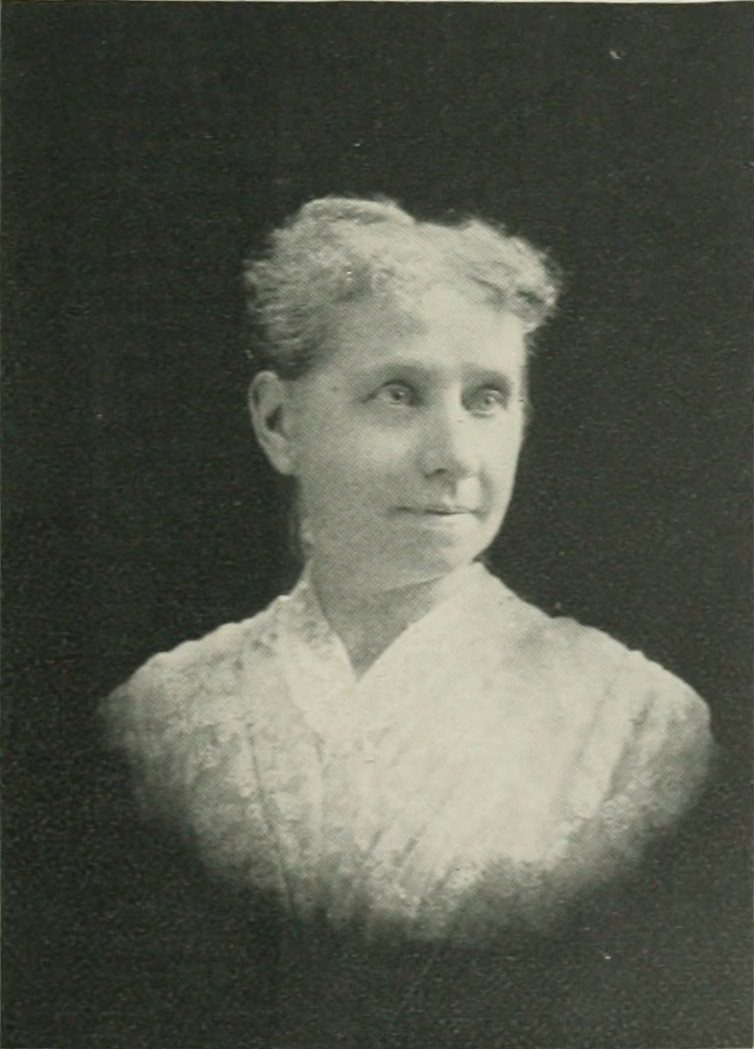
Ellen Sulley Fray

Ellen Sulley Fray (December 2, 1832 – 1903) was a British-born American social reformer. She formed suffrage clubs in several different states and in Canada, and became one of the district presidents of the Ohio Women's Suffrage Association.

== Early years and education ==
Ellen Sulley was born in the parish of Calverton, Nottinghamshire, England, December 2, 1832. She was descended from Huguenot and Danish ancestors. Her mother was a near relative of Lord Denman, Chief Justice of England. Her father was Richard Sulley. who married Elizabeth Denman in 1827, and of their six children, Fray was the third daughter. Her father was a well-known writer upon social and economical questions, and had distinguished himself at the time of the repeal of the Corn Laws in England. When she was but a child, Mr. Sulley moved with his family to the United States, and after some years located in Rochester, New York.

During the early years of her life, while they were traveling from place to place, opportunities for education were limited so lar as books were concerned. Her father thought that it mattered little, as all that girls needed was to write and read, with a little knowledge of arithmetic added. Fray became a reader and a student of history. As a young girl, Fray heard such subjects discussed constantly and became deeply interested in all reforms of the day.

== Career ==
In 1848, she first became roused upon the question of woman suffrage, through attendance upon a convention held in Rochester and presided over by Abigail Bush, with Lucretia Mott, Elizabeth Cady Stanton, and others of the earlier agitators as speakers. That marked an epoch in her life. She had learned of woman's inferiority through the religious instruction which she had received, but henceforth she felt that something in it was wrong. She was advised by her Sunday School teacher carefully to study and compare passages in the Old and New Testaments. That she did thoroughly, and became satisfied that Christ nowhere made any difference between the sexes. Henceforth, her work lay in the direction thus given, and she labored to promote political equality for woman and to advance her rights in the industrial fields.

She formed suffrage clubs in several different States and in Canada, and was repeatedly a delegate to National councils, giving her time and money for the cause. In 1886, Fray entered into a political canvass in Rochester to put a woman upon the board of managers of the State Industrial School; with Mary Stafford Anthony, she worked for three weeks and gained the victory. She went on to become one of the district presidents of the Ohio Woman's Suffrage Association and a prominent member of several of the leading clubs -literary, social and economic- in Toledo. Fray was a member of the Lucas County Board of Visitors to Charitable and Correctional Institutions, and served as president of the Lucas County Woman Suffrage Association.

== Personal life ==
In 1853, she married Frank M. Fray, and they made their home in Fort Wayne, Indiana, before moving to Toledo, Ohio in 1870. It was a happy union, lasting for twenty years, until the death of Mr. Fray. Her two children died in childhood, leaving her alone and free to devote herself to those things which she felt were of a character to help humanity. She died in 1903.
