= Flower (name) =

Flower is an English surname and given name. Notable people with the name include:

== Surname ==
- Andy Flower (born 1968), British-Zimbabwean cricketer
- Barnard Flower (died 1517), Flemish glazier
- Dulcie Flower (born 1938), Australian human rights activist and nurse
- Ernest Flower (1865–1926), British politician
- Grant Flower (born 1970), Zimbabwean cricketer
- Harry Flower (1900–1970), Australian rugby league footballer
- Robert Flower (1955–2014), Australian rules footballer
- Roswell P. Flower (1835–1899), American politician
- Rousseau H. Flower (1913–1988), American paleontologist
- William Flower (disambiguation)

== Given name ==
- Flower Mocher (c. 1729–1801), British army officer
- Flower Msuya (born 1959), Tanzanian phycologist
- Flower A. Newhouse (1909–1994), American Christian mystic and spiritual teacher

== See also ==
- Flowers (name)
- Flora (surname)
- Flora (given name)
- Fleur (given name)
- Tzitzak, Khazar princess and Byzantine Empress whose name meant "flower"
