= Calverton, Nottinghamshire =

Village and civil parish in Nottinghamshire, England

Calverton
- Village and civil parish
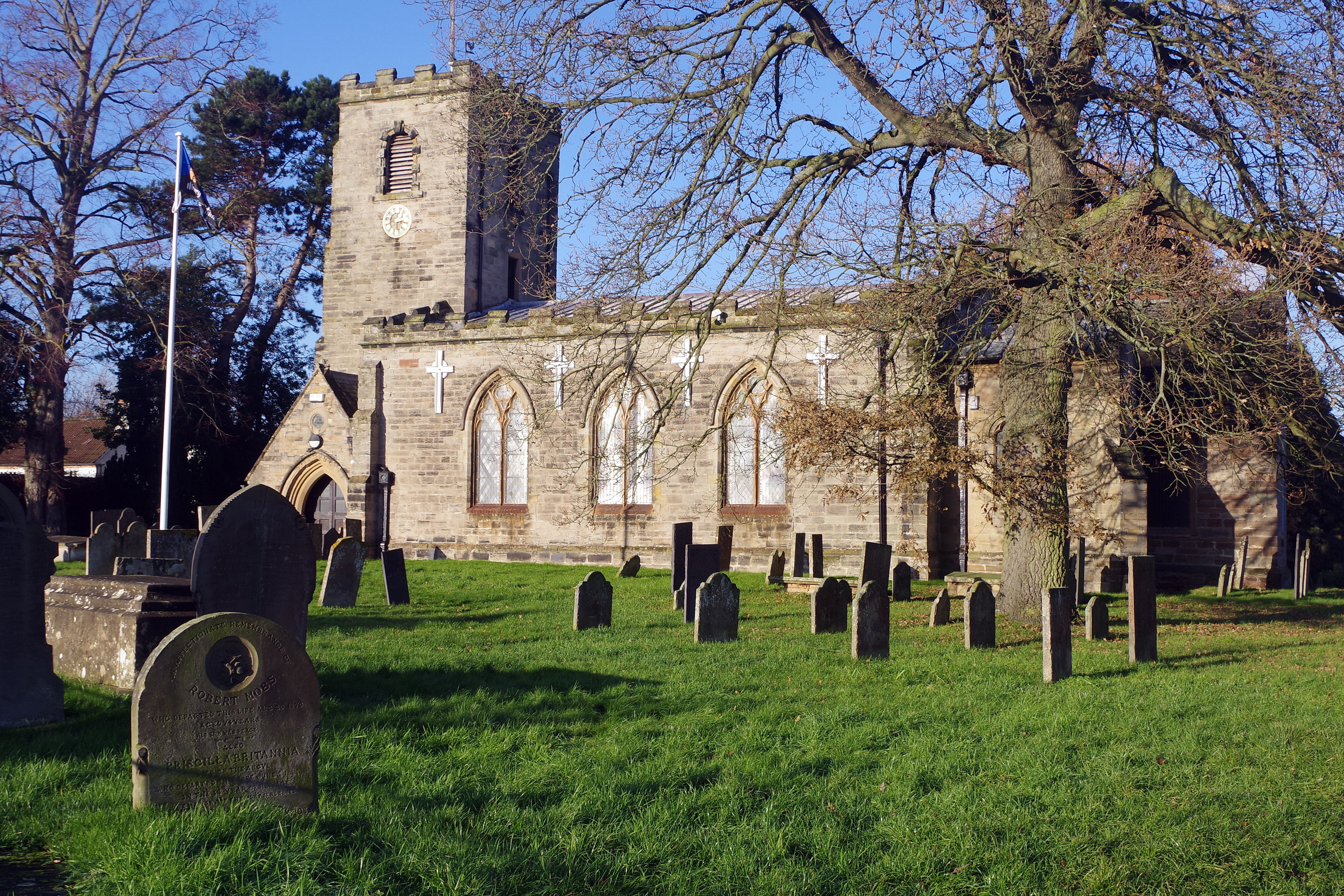
- St Wilfred’s Church

- Location within Nottinghamshire
- Interactive map of Calverton
- Area: 6.63 sq mi (17.2 km^{2})
- Population: 7,282 (2021 census) approximately 9,300 in 2026 due to multiple new housing developments
  - Density: 1,098/sq mi (424/km^{2})
- OS grid reference: SK 61480 49285
  - London: 110 mi (180 km) SSE
- District: Gedling
- Shire county: Nottinghamshire
- Region: East Midlands
- Country: England
- Sovereign state: United Kingdom
- Post town: NOTTINGHAM
- Postcode district: NG14
- Dialling code: 0115
- Police: Nottinghamshire
- Fire: Nottinghamshire
- Ambulance: East Midlands
- UK Parliament: Sherwood
- Website: www.calvertonparishcouncil.gov.uk

Calverton (/ˈkælvərtən/) is a village and civil parish in Nottinghamshire, England and of some 4,247 acres (6.636 sq mi; 1,719 ha; 17.19 km^{2}) in size. It is in the Gedling district, about 7 miles (11 km) north-east of Nottingham, 10 miles (16 km) south-east of Mansfield, and situated, like nearby Woodborough and Lambley, on one of the small tributaries of the Dover Beck. The 2021 census found 7,282 inhabitants in 3,120 households. About 2 miles (3.2 km) miles to the north of the village is the site of the supposed deserted settlement of Salterford.

The parish is bounded on the south-east by Woodborough, to the south-west by Arnold, Papplewick and Ravenshead, to the north by Blidworth, and to the north-east by Oxton and Epperstone.

During most of its existence Calverton was a forest village, in that part of Sherwood known as Thorney Wood Chase, with a rural economy limited by a lack of grazing land, in which handicrafts (like woodworking and the knitting of stockings), must in consequence have assumed a more than usual importance. The parliamentary enclosure of 1780 brought some agrarian progress to the village, but it was not until the opening of a colliery by the National Coal Board in 1952, that the village began to assume its present identity, with new housing estates and marked population growth. The colliery closed in 1999 and while a small industrial estate provides some local employment, Calverton has taken on the character of a large commuter village.

In May 1974 the village was officially twinned with Longué-Jumelles, in the Loire valley of France.

== History ==
=== Toponymy ===
The place appears as Calvretone in the Domesday survey of 1086 and as Kalvirton in the Rotuli Hundredorum of 1275. Scholars believe that the name means "the farm of the calves", from Old English calf (genitive plural "calfra" + tūn. Calverton is one of a number of settlements in the area (with Oxton, Bulcote and Lambley), which contain animal place name elements; this has led to speculation that there was some undiscovered ancient functional connection between the places.

Salterford (q.v.) was Saltreford in 1086 and probably means "ford of the salters", where salter refers to a salt–dealer or carrier, rather than a maker of the commodity. Although the place was situated in the forest, the road to York, or King's Highway (the precursor of the A614) passed close by, and this may well have been frequented by salt-carriers. An alternative explanation that it is derived from a ford near to a saltery, or deer-leap, (Latin saltatorium) on the boundary of the royal hunting ground of Sherwood Forest, and had nothing to do with salt is, perhaps, less likely.

Bonner Hill, Bonner Lane and Burnor Pool may each contain the Old Norse word brunnr, a spring + Old English haugr, a hill. Alternatively the first element may be the Old English burna, meaning a spring or stream.

=== Roman Calverton ===
There are traces of two Roman marching camps in a field north-east of the Oxton Road and Whinbush Lane crossroads on the west side of the valley of the Dover Beck (53°03′02.27″N 1°05′0.92″W).These were identified from aerial photographs, there being no above ground evidence in the form of earthworks. The site of the camps is a protected Scheduled Monument. A smaller one of four acres is set wholly within the defences of a larger, perhaps earlier, one of about twenty-six acres. Marching camps traces are thought to be the remains of the entrenchments made by an army unit for an overnight stop, where there was the chance of an attack. The dimensions of the camp are dictated by the size of the army unit. The transitory nature of these camps suggests that there are unlikely to be substantial archaeological features, other than the identified entrenchment traces.

A lead figurine was found at "a hill-top site" in Calverton. It is of a naked seated female personage with long hair, topped by a plain round head-dress. It may depict a fertility goddess, perhaps a local version of Venus.

According to the Victoria County History, nearly two hundred denarii, chiefly of Trajan and Hadrian (A.D. 98–138), were supposedly found, in the eighteenth century, in a broken pot somewhere in the parish. This may well, however, be a duplicate report of a find, in 1765, of a vessel full of Roman coins dug up at 'Robin Hood's Pot' close to the junction of Haywood Oaks and the A614. More recently, two very similar coin hoards were unearthed at sites less than three hundred yards apart. The first in June 1959, during work on the foundations of Manor Park Infants' School, Collyer Road, and the second during the building of a house in Crookdole Lane in about April 1960. No structural remains were detected with either hoard and the only associated archaeological material was the earthenware pot in which the first hoard was concealed. While most Roman coin hoards are believed to have been buried for safe-keeping, with the intention of being eventually recovered, it is possible that hoards may instead sometimes represent communal votive offerings to the gods.

=== Domesday survey ===
The Domesday survey indicates that the Calverton of 1086 was held by three parties: the Archbishop of York had one part, as a berewick (or outlying estate) of his manor at Blidworth, with a church and priest, and the other two parts were held by Roger of Poitou and the thegn Aelfric of Colwick. The church is one of only eighty-five mentioned amongst some four hundred places names listed in Nottinghamshire and it is perhaps possible that its existence, at that early time, was due to it being situated on land that was part of an archiepiscopal estate.

Two freeman (sochemannus), thirteen villagers (villanus), two smallholders (bordarius) and a priest are mentioned and, assuming that these were the heads of eighteen households, the population of Calverton in 1086 was perhaps around seventy persons.

=== Population ===
The Protestation Returns of 1642 were intended to record a full list of all male inhabitants aged eighteen years and over in each parish, who took an oath to "live and die for the true Protestant religion". A population total can be easily calculated by allowing for the estimated proportion of the population under the age of eighteen years, perhaps 40% and doubling to allow for women. Seventy-five names are listed in the Calverton parish returns, with the note "none refused". A population estimate for the village, immediately before the English Civil War, is therefore 250.

The Hearth Tax was introduced, after the Civil War, in 1662 to provide a regular source of income for the newly restored monarch, King Charles II. Sometimes referred to as "chimney money", the tax was essentially a property tax on households (rather than houses) graded according to the number of their fireplaces. The 1664 Hearth tax returns show that Calverton had seventy-nine chargeable hearths in thirty-five households and seventeen not-chargeable hearths in seventeen households which had been exempted from the tax. A multiplier, recommended by some authorities, is 4.3, which gives a population for Calverton at the end of the English Civil War, of 223 in the fifty-two households.

Village surnames which span the Civil War period include Cooper, Wilkinson, Martin, Pepper, Mottram and Sturtivant.

Soon after the Restoration, Calverton lost its vicar, John Allot, for non-conformity. The Act of Uniformity 1662 required the use of all the rites and ceremonies in the Book of Common Prayer in church services. Revd. Allot, a puritan, was one of nearly two thousand clergymen who refused to conform and were removed from office in the Great Ejection from the Church of England for not complying with the Act. He went to London and ministered in private, but died soon afterwards. The Act encouraged the notion of non-conformity and religious dissent in English society.

By 1676 it was of urgent interest to discover the religious opinions of the people, since the Catholic James was likely to succeed his brother King Charles II. This anxiety led to the Compton Census, a national ecclesiastical survey named for Henry Compton, Bishop of London. Adults (i.e. people over the age of 16) of each parish were recorded as either communicants, popish recusants, or other dissenters. In Calverton 129 communicants were recorded, no recusants, but a remarkable fifty-two dissenters. Demographic historians suggest that the proportion of the population over sixteen in settlements at the time was about 65%, so a simple calculation gives the total population as 278. The population estimate is less interesting however than the high proportion of dissenters, which may well have been a result of the ejection from his living of Calverton's vicar, James Stephenson for an unknown reason, at some time between 1654 and July 1656 ( Stephenson, had however previously been ejected from Blackwell, in Derbyshire in the late 1640s for being a "scandalous drunkard"), and also by the 1662 ejection of John Allot for non-conformity (above). Ejections left a void in a parish, which may have facilitated the growth of groups of dissenters. In 1677 Robert Thoroton commented that Calverton was '... a populous village, with an empty church, for the most part'.

In 1743 a new Archbishop of York, Thomas Herring, was appointed. Soon after taking up his post he wrote to all the clergy within the diocese, seeking information about the parishes they served. Calverton's curate, Maurice Pugh (1705–1766), replied to the archiepiscopal enquiry, and his answers give interesting incidental information about life in the village in the mid 18th century:

- I. We have about eighty Families in Our Parish we have but two Families Dissenters, one of them Presbyterian, one Quaker.
- II. We have a licensd Meeting House in Our Parish for the Presbyterians, but it has not been made use of these 5 or 6 Years
- III. We have a Charity School, but not endowed, to teach fourteen Children to read English at the Direction of Mr: Abel Smith, Trustee to the late Mr. Labray of this Town. the Children are instructed as the Canon requires.
- IV. We have no Alms House, but have land given to the Poor, by Mrs. Jane Pepper late of this Parish and others the Rent of which is 2 : 7 : 0 per An. The Vicar and Parish Officers dispose of it jointly to the Poor, we know of no abuse in the management of it.
- V. I reside upon My Vicarage of Calverton.
- VI. I do the Duty Myself
- VII. I know of no such Persons. (i.e. Non-baptised churchgoers)
- VIII. I read the publick Service once every Lords Day in My Church Morning & Evening alternately I am obliged to do Duty in the Church of Woodborough that is joined with Calverton, I presume the small allowance from the Church of Southwell has been the Reason that Service could not be performed according to Canon
- IX. I catechise the Children and Servants during the time of Lent, and all the Summer from May to Michaelmass, and spend some time every Sunday Evening in instructing the Youth in the Principles of the Christian Religion during that time.
- X. I administer the Sacrament four times in Year at least. I have about a hundred and fifty Communicants they all receive two or three Times in the Year, about three score last Easter.
- XI. I give open and timely Warning of the Sacrament before it is administered, My Parishioners give Me Notice when any Young persons design to communicate, or new Servants, but the elderly People I have not called upon to do so but will for the future. I have had no Reason to refuse the Sacrament to any Person. Calverton 21 May. 1744 MAURICE PUGH Vicar

If the family size was 4.75 in 1743, then the settlement had about 380 inhabitants at that time. Twenty years later, at the time of Archbishop Drummond's 1764 visitation, Maurice Pugh reported that the number of families had risen to 'above 110', and so the number of villagers was perhaps 520. Throsby, however, writing in the 1790s said that 'the village consist of 100 dwellings'.

By the time of the first decennial census of 1801 the population had risen to 636 in 129 families.

=== Enclosure ===
Until the opening of the colliery in 1952, the greatest social change in Calverton's history had been arguably the parliamentary enclosure of 1778–80. By the time that an enclosure petition was presented to Parliament on 1 December 1778 by "several landowners and persons interested", some 996 acres, or about 30% of the parish had already been enclosed. Some of these acres would of course have been accounted for by the houses and gardens of the settlement itself and the rest had been enclosed piece-meal over centuries. The award, when it came in 1780, would reveal that there had been only 51 acres of the open fields left to enclose. This is about 1 1/2% of the total area of the parish, so any notion that the primary objective of Calverton's enclosure was to rearrange the village arable from strips and furlongs in large communally farmed fields, into the landscape of today, must be resisted. The rest of the land enclosed was about 550 acres of warren and Sansom wood and 1728 acres of common and forest, much of it to the west of the Old Rufford Road (A614).

Calverton was one of forty or so townships within the ancient bounds of Sherwood Forest, and so was subject to forest law, which protected both the animals (primarily deer) for the exclusive use of the king. It may be that because of this, agricultural improvement and commercial development in Calverton was different from other, more purely agricultural, settlements. Specifically the village was situated in the southern of the two administrative districts or bailiwicks into which Sherwood Forest was divided, the part called Thorney Wood Chase, of which the Earl of Chesterfield was hereditary keeper. Thorney Wood Chase was formerly well wooded and stocked with fallow deer, but growth of population and changes in agricultural practice were altering the character of the area.

Back in 1609 Richard Bankes' map had shown the progress of enclosure in the parish. Calverton, like most settlements on Bankes' map, was found to be surrounded by a number of large communally farmed arable fields. These must have been in existence for many centuries, but by 1609 each of the large open fields had had some of its land changed into non-communable closes, some of which may have been used for pasture. In Calverton the map shows about twenty small closes converted out of a portion of a field, The Moores, to the north east of the village, between the present Carrington Lane and the Doverbeck. Nearby was a bigger New Close. Many other closes, large and small, had been created between Dark Lane and the southern parish boundary with Woodborough, in the large Hyll Feild. More closes line the western edge of the Hyll Feild along the course of the stream which now flows near George's Lane. Other parts of the parish were less subject to the making of permanent closes, as they were more wooded and breck agriculture was practised. These brecks were temporary enclosures made out of the forest waste land and sheep walks. Plots of land were fenced off and ploughed as arable for up to seven years, after which period the fences were taken down and the land reverted to open forest. In Calverton each messuage was entitled, as a customary or common right, to an acre of the breck, and each cottage to half an acre.

According to Dr. Thoroton's history of the county, the freeholders of Calverton in 1612 were Christopher Strelley, John Sturtivant, Robert Cooper, John Lees, Thomas Leeson, Ed. Benet, John Barber, John Lambrey, Humfr. Youle, Euseby Marshall of Arnall, John Chaworth of Southwell, esquire and John Cressewell.

A bill was presented in March 1779 by the Nottinghamshire MP Lord Edward Bentinck, who was the younger brother of the third Duke of Portland. It noted counter-petitions to some of its provisions by the Earl of Chesterfield and other smaller owners. The Earl of Chesterfield's objections concerns the alleged insufficient compensation to be allowed to him as hereditary ranger of Thorney Wood Chase. The earl's claims were apparently met by the promoters, and the bill was amended accordingly. The other counter-petitioners, led by villager William Huthwaite, described themselves as "owners and proprietors of ancient houses having right of common". They alleged that if the bill passed it would be prejudicial to their rights and properties (as noted above, only 51 acres of open fields remained) and injurious to the public in general. They successfully secured the appointment of an additional, fifth, commissioner, a local man George Padley of Calverton, to represent their interests.

Calverton Inclosure Act 1779
- Act of Parliament
- Parliament of Great Britain
- Long title: An Act for dividing and enclosing the Open Fields, Meadows, Pastures, Commons, Forest and Waste Grounds, in the Parish of Calverton, in the County of Nottingham.
- Citation: 19 Geo. 3. c. 79 Pr.
- Territorial extent: Great Britain

Dates
- Royal assent: 18 May 1779
- Commencement: 26 November 1778 (Note: Start of session.)

Status: Current legislation

An Act for dividing and inclosing the open fields, meadows, pastures, commons, forest and waste grounds in the parish of Calverton in the County of Nottingham, the Calverton Inclosure Act 1779 (19 Geo. 3. c. 79 Pr.), was passed by Parliament in May 1779. After a little over a year, on 7 July 1780, the commissioners were able to sign the award. One hundred and seventy plots of land were allotted to nearly ninety owners. Because about 2,334 acres of Calverton had been enclosed in such a short time, it seems very likely that much of the detail mentioned in the award had already been agreed by the principal owners, and the work of the commissioners will have been to satisfy the claims of those villagers who perhaps owned no land at all, but did have common rights around the parish. These rights would be replaced, at enclosure, by small allotments of land. John Roe (q.v.) for example received just 11 perches, or about 330 square yards.

The principal landowners were now the prebends of Oxton, Revd James Bingham as vicar, the Duke of Portland, Margaret Sherbrooke, Elizabeth Bainbrigge and Thomas Smith. There were many other smaller proprietors however, and because of this multiplicity of ownership, Calverton could not be described as a "closed village", where the property was in the hands of a few people who could control development and, for example, restrict people coming in who might become dependent on poor relief.

The initial stimulus or spark to parliamentary enclosure is not clear. As noted, it was not to reorganise the arable, but since the largest Calverton landowners were now the holders of the two prebends of Oxton, Hugh Thomas and John Marsden, it may well have been prompted by them, so that the annual payment of tithes to the prebendaries could be changed into an allotment of land, and all tithes could be extinguished. Thereafter the land, that had been allotted, would provide an income to maintain the prebendaries, who served at Southwell Minster. The Duke of Portland would also have been a supporter of enclosure, since the Calverton villagers' common right of breck agriculture must have been an irritation at a time when the 'Dukeries' were beginning to subsume the forest wastes.

Enclosure meant that the system whereby land which was owned by one person, but over which other people had certain traditional or common rights, such as to allow their livestock to graze upon it, or to collect firewood, or collect sand and gravel was ended forever. The common right of breck agriculture, which was peculiar to forest villages, was also brought to an end. The landscape of the parish was also altered; hedges were planted, drains dug, gates and stiles erected, footpaths and bridleways established in law and roads (sixty feet between the hedges) were laid out, so that today's Calverton is recognizably as set down in the Award of July 1780.

Perhaps prompted by the social upheaval of parliamentary enclosure and by a gradual movement towards self-help, the first friendly society in the village was formed in 1783, and registered in 1794 under the provisions of the original Friendly Societies Act of 1793 (Roses's Act). Registration gave a friendly society a measure of legal protection, publicised its role as a provider of sickness benefit, and might help to prevent it from falling under suspicion of trade union activity. By 1815 there were perhaps five friendly societies extant in Calverton, including one for women.

=== William Lee ===
Although contemporary documentary evidence is lacking, the parish traditionally claims William Lee, inventor of the stocking frame, as its own. The Nottinghamshire historian Robert Thoroton asserted in his 1677 history of the county that Lee was a native of Calverton, while John Aubrey in his Brief Lives, written between 1669 and 1693, thought that he was born in Sussex; and Charles Deering in Nottinghamia Vetus et Nova, published in 1751, claimed that Lee was of Woodborough. Calverton's claim is probably the strongest, as the Lee surname appears in parish registers of the time and a William Lee "the elder", whose death was recorded in 1607, bequeathed a gold ring to his eldest son, William, who may have been the inventor. There is little evidence that William Lee was ever curate in the parish or even in Holy Orders. Aubrey appears to be first to describe him as a "poor curate", while Thoroton only mentions a Cambridge M.A. degree, and even this is disputed. Lee might of course simply have acted as a lay reader as a pragmatic response to staffing needs, and read services "plainlie, distinctlie and audiblie" without preaching or interpreting, as had been laid down by Archbishop Parker in 1561. The vicar of Calverton throughout the period was a James Revell.

The myths surrounding Lee, including the supposed reasons for the invention, a girl-friend or wife and an alleged refusal by Queen Elizabeth to grant a patent, seem to stem from a volume of 1831 called History of the Framework Knitters by Gravener Henson (1785–1852), a prominent workers' leader of the time. Henson stated that he had got the greater part of his information about Lee from certain "ancient stocking makers" who all gave a similar account, and that the authenticity of the story is 'in some measure confirmed by the arms of the London Framework Knitters, which consist of a stocking-frame without the woodwork, with a clergyman on one hand and a woman on the other, as supporters.' Some of the myths were made visual in Alfred Elmore's familiar oil painting of 1847, The Origin of the Stocking Loom in the Nottingham Castle Museum.

There seems little doubt, however, that a William Lee did invent the stocking frame, since a partnership agreement between William Lee and George Brooke of 6 June 1600 exists in the archives of the Historical Manuscript Commission, and this agreement describes the invention. Failing to find much enthusiasm in this country for his ingenuity, Lee went to Rouen and set up stocking frames there, and is believed to have died in France, in obscurity, in about 1615. By the end of the seventeenth century however, stocking frames, perhaps the most complex piece of machinery employed in the pre-industrial age, were in widespread use in England and elsewhere.

=== John Roe and the Roeite sect ===
The Roeites, John Roe's Society or Reformed Quakers (sometimes disparagingly, 'Deformed Quakers'), were a group of dissenting Protestants, which married and buried its members, as the Quakers did, and which flourished for a while in Calverton. Their original meeting house was a converted barn, close to the junction of Woods Lane and Dark Lane, where a large tree now stands. (53°02′10.432″N 1°05′13.132″W).

John Roe (1732–1820), who founded the sect, may have been of the same family as Robert Roe, the "oppressed Quaker" of Epperstone, who had been in trouble in 1669 for holding illegal religious meetings, and of Richard Roe the clockmaker of the same village.

As early as 1759, John Roe had written about his religious beliefs and of his reactions to the preaching of dissenters who came to Calverton, but it was not until about 1780, when he was in his mid-fifties, that he established his sect. He may well have been prompted by unhappiness with the vicar James Bingham since, in 1778, he had been cited (as John Rooe {sic}, basket-maker) for non-payment of tithes, together with Thomas Hinde, tailor, and Bartholomew Lee, farmer. He must have been encouraged by the provisions of the recently passed Nonconformist Relief Act 1779 which freed dissenting ministers from the need to subscribe to the Thirty-Nine Articles of the Church of England, formerly required by the Act of Toleration 1689.

The Roeites' presence in the village evidently caused a degree of bad feeling, because Calverton schoolmaster Joseph Morley, writing to the Nottingham Journal in 1787, was moved to declare that:

...their religion in short, is a heap of inconsistencies promiscuously jumbled together, and their preaching an invariable compound of railing, absurdity, billingsgate and blackguardism...John Roe, their founder, holds himself as the only true prophet since the days of the Apostles, and he bitterly inveighs against all denominations, and d—ns the world in a bag...and I need not hesitate to aver that the wickedness, blasphemy and abomination delivered from Roe's pulpit are without parallel.

A peculiarity of the group was the custom of marrying its members after partners had been selected, not by courtship, but by a jury of twelve drawing lots. This was "to know precisely the will of Heaven concerning their matrimonial union" (vide cleromancy). The idea was so extraordinary that even the German poet and philosopher Friedrich von Schiller, in far-away Stuttgart, was moved to write about it, and lamented in a 1781 article, Arme jugend van Calverton!, about the lack of sentimentality and passion in the arrangement. The Roeites however contended that they had the right to marry, as well as to perform any religious duty, under the Act of Toleration 1689. The Marriage Act 1753 had tightened the existing ecclesiastical rules, providing that for a marriage to be valid it had to be performed in a church and after the publication of banns. However, Jews and, crucially, Quakers were seemingly exempted from its provisions (Catholics and other dissenting groups were not exempt), and it may be that John Roe believed, for this reason, that this act did not apply to his "Quaker-like" group.

On 1 May 1780 John Roe went through a marriage ceremony, in the meeting house, with Isabel Morris, of the parish of St Mary, Nottingham. Later Elizabeth Morris (sister to Isabel) was similarly joined with Thomas Bush. On 20 April 1785 the churchwardens of St Wilfrids accused Isabel Morris (using her maiden name, rather than "Mrs Roe"), before the Church Court at Southwell Minster, of having three illegitimate children and Elizabeth Morris ('Mrs Bush') of having one such child. The ostensible reason must have been that the illegitimate offspring would become a burden on the parish. The two mothers failed to appear at Southwell to answer the charges, and in February 1786 letters of excommunication against them were issued by the vicar, James Bingham. On Sunday 5 March the curate of Calverton, Ephraim Rogerson read out the order in church. As the two women did not apply to have the excommunication lifted within forty days, the Archbishop of York asked the Crown to issue writs of excommunicato capiendo to the Civil Courts to imprison the women, and they were taken to the county jail, without any prospect of ever being released.

Although no child of the sect seems to have actually become chargeable to Calverton parish, "Mrs Roe" and "Mrs Bush" had effectively, been sentenced to life imprisonment in the Nottingham county jail. The matter had got out of hand, and reports began to appear in the press which expressed disquiet about the affair and the way in which the animosity between the dissenters and the Established Church was "disgraceful in this enlightened age". It was reported that, in the village, neighbours set fire to the fences of the Roeites, interrupted their services by blowing horns and firing guns, killed John Roe's cow, "broke his trees" and even threw dirt at the congregation when passing them in the street.

John Roe's brother William wrote from Farnsfield to Lord George Gordon, of the Protestant Association, appealing for his help (Gordon had himself been excommunicated) and the M.P. John Courtenay, who was later to write Conduct of the Dissenters in England (1790), raised the matter in Parliament, as a general feeling of unease about the issue began to become apparent. A legal counsellor in 1788 gave his opinion that if the writs had been correctly issued, there seemed no possibility of them being released from prison, unless their marriages could be made out to be Quaker, or their Roeite marriages could be made legal by a new act of Parliament. In August 1790 Lord Kenyon, the Lord Chief Justice said that they could be released if they did penance, but the two sisters were not at all penitent and refused. Eventually, in 1798 after twelve years imprisonment, it appears that "Mrs Roe" and "Mrs Bush" were allowed to escape and return to Calverton, when part of the jail was being rebuilt.

The Quaker writer William Howitt attended one of John Roe's services, and described the converted barn amongst the orchards. A very plain chapel with loft, pulpit and seats (not at all like a Quaker meeting house, thought Howitt), and a congregation of thirty slumbering, while Roe, attended by Isabel, provided a "droning commentary" on the transfiguration.

John Roe, a small man with long white hair, combed in flowing locks on his shoulders, continued to preach in the converted barn, and died on Sunday 2 January 1820. The Roeite sect did not long survive the death of its founder and, although White's Directory of 1844 reported a "small meeting house", there was no mention of the sect in the Religious Census of 1851.

=== Calverton Crosse ===
There are two references in wills to a "Calverton Crosse", presumably a now lost village standing cross. Village crosses were free-standing upright structures, usually of stone, which were mostly erected during the medieval period. There are two extant examples in the nearby village of Linby.

In 1499 Thomas Belfin (or Belfyn) of Calverton, amongst various bequests to the church of St Wilfrid, including a rood loft, bequeathed 6s 8d (34p) to the cross; Item lego fabricæ crucis de le ston in parte occidentali vilæ de Calverton vj^{s} viij^{d} (Item I leave to the fabric of the stone cross at the west part of Calverton village 6s 8d). In Testamenta Eboracensia, the 1545 will of Richard Willoughbye, alderman of Nottingham, contains the sentence, 'To Wilyame Willughebie, my sone... a garden sette at Calverton Crosse in the tenor of John Godbere...'

Village crosses were systematically destroyed by the iconoclasts of the Reformation and the English Civil War as idolatrous Catholic symbols, usually decapitated, but sometimes completely removed. The former location of the cross is not known, but since the site was allegedly in the west part or side of Calverton (parte occidentali), it is perhaps plausible that it stood at the junction of Main Street and George's Lane/Old Mews Lane. The date of its removal and the fate of the stones remain obscure, but it is tempting to speculate that some of them may form parts of nearby dwellings.

=== Salterford ===
In the Domesday survey, it is recorded as belonging to Osbern son of Richard and being six bovates (perhaps 90 acres) of "waste", which may have meant that it was uninhabited or uncultivated, or both. It is referred to in the 1330 Assize rolls as Molendin de Salturford so that a watermill must have been built there by that time.

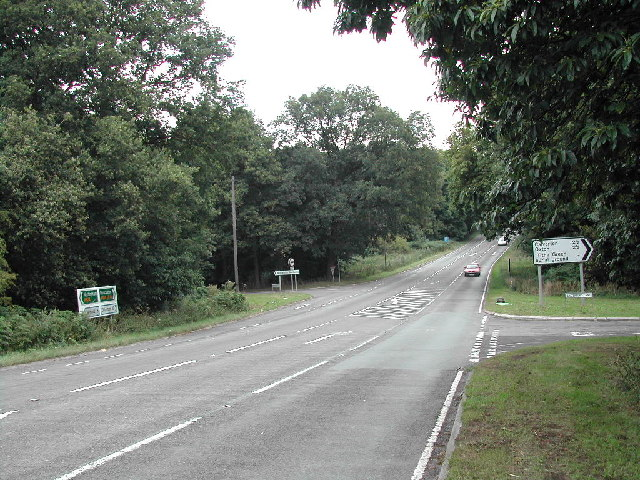
Junction of Old Rufford Road (A614) and Salterford Lane (at right) – geograph.org.uk – 36816

In the early Tudor period it seems to have belonged to a family of landowners called Revell who sold the land, with a pond, to Thomas Hockynson (or Hutchinson) in 1551. The 1589 perambulation of Sherwood Forest includes Salterford Dam as a landmark on the boundary of the royal hunting ground, so evidently the dam (or body of water confined by an embankment [OED]), was already there as a source of water for a mill by the Dover Beck.

A correspondent of the Nottinghamshire Guardian writing in 1883 referred to a manor house at Salterford, said by Dr Thoroton to have been occupied by Sir Thomas Hutchinson (1587–1643) father of the roundhead Colonel John Hutchinson. The site of this manor house was supposed to have been ploughed up in the making of flood meadows by the 5th Duke of Portland (1800–1879). The Revd T. Woollen Smith (vicar of Calverton) in replying to this correspondent referred to a scribbled note, of 1760, in the parish register, probably written by Revd Maurice Pugh. There were two burials in June 1614 of women who had been (wrote Pugh), ...inhabitants of a house yt stood at Salterford Dam now a Rabit Warren 1760 it looks like some plague. There was a corn mill there and a manor house within a Mote near the Dam head the Mill below it some distance served wh Water by a cut from ye Dam. Despite Pugh's assertion, the 1609 map of Sherwood Forest, while listing "Mr Randall Barton" and "Mr Hutchinson" as freeholders of both "Saunterforde Manor" and "Saunsham Woods", had shown no habitations or buildings of any kind.

In 1662 Colonel Hutchinson sold the manor of Salterford to William Willoughby of Hunsdon in Hertfordshire. Five years later the manor (including "ground where a mill lately stood") was sold to two London gentlemen and, soon after that, in 1676 Humphrey Jennens, the ironmaster of Erdington, was authorised by the Sherwood Forest Court to enclose nearby Sansom Wood. In January 1709 Charles Jennens (son of Humphrey and father of the celebrated Charles Jennens) sold the land to John Holles, 1st Duke of Newcastle. In July of that year Salterford was being rented to a warrener called John Bagulie of Blidworth.

By 1716 Salterford belonged to Lord Harley, 2nd Earl of Oxford, as it had evidently been bequeathed to his wife, who was the only child of the late Duke. In 1721 Salterford was being leased at £20 p.a. to Samuel Wilkinson of Calverton as a rabbit warren, with permission also to make brecks (q.v. ) to take three crops. It seems that Samuel Wilkinson was the son-in-law of the vicar, Revd Maurice Pugh and was receiving letters from him concerning the tithes for corn, sheep, and even rabbits, up to 1750. The enclosure map of 1780 shows that the vicar had been awarded the area at the junction of Salterford Lane and the Old Rufford Road, "in lieu of tithes", while "Sansome Warren" covered the area where now there are woods and ponds. The Revd T. Woollen Smith noted in 1883 that he had spoken to a man who, as a boy, 'remembered... seeing remains of an old manor house when the present Salterford dam was being made'.

Salterford may well have originated as a place where salters used a ford, at a low-lying point on the trackway through the forest, now known as the A614 or Old Rufford Road. It seems however to owe its continued existence in the records to the construction of a mill, at an early time, a few hundred metres away, at the point where the Dover Beck enters Calverton parish. It appears to be the only place in the parish where there was sufficient water power to turn the wheel of a mill and it is therefore to be associated with other ancient mills on that river, such as those formerly at Oxton, Epperstone and Gonalston. While there may have been a miller's house, at Salterford, to accompany the water-mill, documentary evidence for a Manor House or settlement at the location is lacking. This may well have been simply a landholding, given a collective name in the taxation records, without a central, nucleated settlement ever having existed.

=== The nineteenth century ===
Table to show the population of the parish in the nineteenth century, from the decennial census:
Year	Population
1801	636
1811	904
1821	1064
1831	1196
1841	1339
1851	1427
1861	1372
1871	1319
1881	1246
1891	1199
1901	1159

Although the village is estimated to have had about two hundred knitting frames at the beginning of the 19th century, it seems to have escaped the worst of the local Luddite disturbances of 1811–12. Because the Luddite rioters only broke the frames of those owners that had lowered men's wages, it may be that none had been reduced in Calverton. A spirit of radicalism did exist however as Calverton was one of eleven Nottinghamshire villages (which also included Woodborough, Oxton and Lambley) that presented petitions to Parliament in 1817 demanding electoral reform. The petitioners wished (in a foreshadowing of later Chartist demands), for annual elections of representatives chosen by 'all men who have attained the age of twenty-one... seeing that all men pay Taxes, and all men have lives and liberties to protect'. At the time only male owners of property worth at least forty shillings per year in rent were allowed to vote. Limited electoral reform was not to come until 1832. (q.v.)

By the time the first county directory was published in 1832, Calverton had grown to a "considerable village" of 1,196 persons, of whom 270 were engaged in manufacturing, of one sort or another, forty-seven in retail and handicrafts and only thirty-seven were primarily employed as agricultural labourers. It was not therefore a traditional English agricultural village, but one in which cottage industries, such as the making of hosiery, dominated. William White's directory claimed nearly three hundred stocking frames were in use at the time.

Calverton's principal resident was Lady Katherine Sherbrooke (1783–1856), the widow of Sir John Coape Sherbrooke (1764–1830) who had been Governor General of British North America and who had retired to live at Calverton Hall. Other residents included five shoemakers, four hosiery manufacturers, four shopkeepers, three butchers as well as blacksmiths, frame-smiths and tailors.

The 1832 directory lists two pubs, the Admiral Rodney and the White Lion, as well as three beerhouses, perhaps recently opened as a result of the Beerhouse Act 1830. The Gleaner (sic) public house was not to make its first appearance, in a directory, until 1876. Its application, as a beerhouse (together with the Forest Tavern), for a spirit licence having been refused in 1861.

Partly as a result of disillusionment with the Reform Act 1832 (2 & 3 Will. 4. c. 45), radicalism raised its head again in the shape of the People's Charter of 1838, as textile workers saw real electoral reform, which the Charter proposed, as a means whereby their standard of living might be improved. One of the Nottinghamshire organisers of Chartism was a Calverton man called George Harrison (1798–1871) who was a farmer and Primitive Methodist preacher. He had already, in June 1835, strongly objected, at the annual vestry meeting, to the dissenters and "the parish at large" supporting St. Wilfrid's against their will, by means of the church rate. It was this Harrison who invited the leader of the Chartists, Feargus O'Connor to Calverton on Monday 25 July 1842. It may have been thought that a meeting of Chartists was less likely to be broken up by the authorities in the countryside, than in the town of Nottingham.

The Chartists' own newspaper The Northern Star described, in extravagant terms, the arrival of O'Connor by train from Derby, and his progress in a carriage procession along Mansfield Road, picking up delegations from suburbs and villages along the way till at last, around 2 pm, Calverton was reached. O'Connor made a long speech at "Bonner Pool" to a crowd, which the newspaper estimated at five thousand, and then a tea-party was served in a marquee "in a beautiful pasture bounded by a splendid wood". There followed an evening of singing, dancing and games, during which time a supposed government spy was pointed out and questioned. O'Connor spent the night in Calverton and the following morning, he set out for more speech-making in Mansfield.

Four weeks later The Northern Star reported that, on Monday 22 and Tuesday 23 August 1842, there had been skirmishes with the village constable and a general withdrawal of labour by workers in Calverton, but the Battle of Mapperley Hills, on that Tuesday 23 August, perhaps saw the zenith of Chartism in Nottinghamshire, and the working class began to focus instead on opposition to the Corn Laws and the high price of bread.

The General Inclosure Act 1845 (8 & 9 Vict. c. 118) had required that provision should be made at enclosure for the landless, in the form of "field gardens" or allotments, limited to a quarter of an acre, and this will have been prompted by the fear of civil unrest amongst the poor. Calverton had already been enclosed, but there is evidence that in 1845 this "cottage garden system" had just been introduced to the village, and that frame-workers were cultivating rented allotments. In that year allotment tenants paid their first half–yearly rent to Calverton farmer Mr. William Ward, who provided them with a free supper, prepared by Samuel Fletcher at the White Lion. Not only were the poor more likely to be happier having a stake in the land, but it was hoped that landowners would have to pay less in the form of the poor-rate, if landless workers in the village were able to grow their own food.

In 1851, at the same time as the census (which had found 1,427 person in 302 houses), there was a census of 'Accommodation and Attendance at Worship.' This is often referred to as the '1851 Religious Census' and it revealed both the popularity of religion and the variety of options, both established and nonconformist, for the prospective Calverton worshipper. Samuel Oliver, vicar of St Wilfrid's parish church (q.v.) claimed an average attendance of forty-seven in the morning, 132 in the afternoon and 133 at evening service. The Methodists appeared to be a state of some disarray at the time. There was a Primitive Methodist Chapel, which had been erected about 1783 for the Calverton Roeite sect (q.v.), but had been taken over from them in 1848. This building was used by the Reformed Methodists in the morning (seventy worshippers), as well as by the Primitive Methodists both in the afternoon (90) and in the evening (150). There was also a Wesleyan Methodist Chapel, erected on Mansfield Lane in 1815, which could muster only twenty-five in the evening; Matthew Shepherd, the steward, explained that the low number attending was due to "the agitation in the connexion having caused a division here". The New Methodists had built a place of worship in about 1820, but had sold it the Baptists in 1832 and the minister, Samuel Ward, for the Particular Baptist Chapel, claimed a congregation of 120. The relatively recently formed Latter-day Saints (or Mormons ) held services in a building that was "not used exclusively for worship" and the elder, Thomas Lester, claimed an average of forty in the afternoon and fifty-seven in the evening. There was no mention of the Roeite sect (q.v.), in the census, some thirty years after the death of its founder, John Roe, in 1823. This religious census of 1851 was never repeated, not because of doubts about its accuracy, but probably because it was felt to have shown the popularity of the dissenters.

Although the Reform Act 1832 had extended the franchise, only sixty male land-, or lease-holders out of Calverton's population of 1,427, were eligible to vote in the South Nottinghamshire by-election of 1851 and twenty of them were not even residents of the parish. Two Calverton voters lived as far away as Bishops Waltham in Hampshire. Of the sixty eligible, just forty-six actually did vote. While Calverton voters preferred Sydney Pierrepont (the future Earl Manvers) to the tenant farmers' candidate William Barrow of Southwell by twenty-eight to eighteen, it was actually the latter who was narrowly elected for the constituency.

Prior to 1800, education for the less well-off was generally restricted to the occasional charity school. Calverton was fortunate to benefit from a bequest of a Nottingham hosiery manufacturer, and village native called Jonathan Labray, who died a bachelor in 1718. His trustees arranged to pay the master of a day school and to allow him use of a house and four tons of coal per year. In 1835, sixty two males were taught; some paid for by the endowment, and some by weekly payments of one penny for reading and one penny for writing. There was also another school where twenty-five girls were taught at the expense of their parents. An infant school was started in 1833 for forty-four males and thirty-seven females, supported by subscription and pennies per week. This school seems to have moved into a purpose-built structure at Burnor Pool in 1846 which became the National School in 1852. Children not taught in these schools might have had some instruction in one of the three Sunday schools; one attached to St Wilfrid's, one to the Methodists and the last to the Baptists.

The earliest reference yet found to Calverton cricket was on Monday 24 October 1836, when neighbouring Woodborough beat the village by 38 runs, in a two-innings match played at Woodborough (67 and 71, 50 and 50). The first mention of cricket in Calverton (and the earliest scorecard), was on Monday, 30 September 1844, when members of the two brass bands of Calverton and Woodborough met each other, and the home side won by six wickets (47 and 42, 41 and 49 for 4 ). The teams, including star player, Calverton tailor Cornelias Hind (aged 39), afterwards enjoyed a supper of roast beef at the Admiral Rodney. Before football became popular, the cricket season ran from April to October and, at a time when stockingers and others could control their hours of work, Monday was a popular day for fixtures. A Calverton Cricket Club had been formed by 1852, as there is a report of a club dinner at the Gleaner beerhouse on 'Whit-Tuesday' (8 June) of that year. In July 1855 a match was played between a team consisting of eleven members of the Hind family, and the rest of the village. The village won by twenty runs. A second eleven is noted in 1856, and there is a scorecard of 1860, showing that a team of juniors beat Woodborough by eight runs. Calverton's most celebrated Victorian cricketer was Wilfred Flowers (1856–1926) who was born in the village in December 1856, and who played in eight Test matches and in 442 first-class matches for Nottinghamshire.

In November 1880, by arrangement with the 6th Duke of Portland, Hucknall began to take a supply of water from a 200' deep borehole, on the Old Rufford Road (A614), opposite the Watchwood Plantation. A pumping station sent 330 gallons per minute from the borehole, through six miles of eight-inch pipe, south-west to a reservoir at Hucknall which held 400,000 gallons. This allowed Hucknall to have twenty gallons of water per person per day, and was at a time when Calverton was without any piped water at all (q.v.).

The population of Calverton had risen dramatically since the start of the century (see table), but the hosiery industry was beginning to show signs of decline because of changes in fashion and because manually operated stocking frames were becoming outdated. In Nottingham, the population increased because of the rise of lace manufacture, more advanced steam–powered frames, and by migration from villages like Calverton, following the passing of the St. Mary's Nottingham Inclosure Act 1845 (8 & 9 Vict. c. 7 Pr.), which at last had permitted housing and industry in the former common fields of the town.

In 1881 the census recorded, in a population of 1246, a total of 294 workers in clothes-making (everything from hosiery to hats, shawls and gloves), while ninety-six were engaged in agriculture.

In January 1898 Sir Charles Seely bought the Sansom Wood Estate in Calverton from the 6th Duke of Portland. The Seely family were coal owners and had bought the Babbington pits (Cinderhill, Broxtowe, Kimberley and Bulwell, inter alia) in 1870, so it is probable that the Calverton land purchase was intended for extractive, rather than agricultural purposes. In May 1898 the Manchester Times noted that Sir Charles was renting 80 acres of land to the Parish Council for allotments, 'at a trifle over 31 shillings' (£1.55 per year) per acre, in addition to a recreation ground of four acres, at a nominal rent of 6d (2 1/2 p).

=== The twentieth century ===
The rural exodus of the nineteenth century slowed in the early twentieth, partly because of temporary prosperity in agriculture, and Calverton's population fell slightly to 1,101 in 1911 and 1,040 in 1921 then rose to 1,058 in 1931. There was no decennial census in 1941 because of the Second World War, but by 1951, at the end of the final decade in which Calverton could justly be called a rural village, the population had increased to 1,304 in 431 households.

As noted above, Calverton was without a supply of piped water and the existing supply was often insufficient for the village's population. In addition, in dry seasons, it had to be carted long distances to water cattle. In June 1900, Basford RDC accepted Sir Charles Seely's offer to provide a water supply for Calverton. A reservoir, pumping station and caretakers' house were to be built at his expense, and 10,000 gallons of water per day would be supplied to the village from a borehole, for £87 per year. The reservoir and pumping station were on the site of present-day Waterworks Cottage, off Longue Drive.

The first reference to a Calverton football team, so far found, was in November 1903, when the draw was made for the second round of the Notts. Shield Competition and Calverton St. Wilfrid's were drawn to play Carlton St. Paul's at home. In 1908 Calverton St. Wilfrid's were disqualified from the Competition for multiple offences, including fielding four ineligible players, and the Secretary of the club, F. Dovey, was suspended from playing or football management.

In the 1906 General Election, 346 (male) villagers were eligible to vote in the, erstwhile, Newark constituency, which was about 31% of the total Calverton population. This is to be compared with the 60 villagers, or only 4%, who were eligible in 1851 (q.v.). The increase was a consequence of the Second and Third Reform Acts of 1867 and 1884. The poorest men were still unable to vote by reason of a property qualification, not abolished until 1918.

The last census before the First World War had found 1,101 inhabitants in 275 households. Certain surnames predominated; there were 114 with the surname Meads, 63 were called Binch, 50 Cooper and 50 Worthington. Villagers were soon being called up to fight in the war, and when the Calverton Co-op failed in their attempt to prevent William Loyd-Meads from being conscripted, they were said to have lost their last male employee. By the war's end, Calverton had lost 33 men (over 6% of the male population); the names of the dead are listed on a memorial in the church.

After the war, as a result of the "Homes Fit for Heroes" campaign, a Housing Act was passed to allow the building of council housing. In 1920 Basford RDC made plans for houses in the village for rent, which would cost £1,300 to build. Calverton councillor Charles Collyer (1877–1953) was shocked at the price and pointed out that the average rent in the village was only 2s 6d (12 1/2p) per week. It is not known how many houses were built, but the population increased from 272 households in 1921 to 305 households in 1931, so perhaps less than thirty houses in the decade.

Plans for a railway, to improve transport in the agricultural districts of Nottinghamshire, which would join Lowdham to a point near Blidworth, and which would serve Epperstone, Woodborough, Calverton and Oxton were proposed in 1919 by the Notts. War Agriculture Committee.

The 1930s brought significant change to the village. Electric light arrived in 1930, with the erection of just a dozen street lights in October of that year. The supplier may have been the Derbyshire and Nottinghamshire Electric Power Company. By 1939 however the number of overhead electric cables was considered "a menace", and requests were made that new ones should be routed underground. In August 1932, Nottingham Corporation's water engineer expressed disappointment that so few applications for mains water were being received from villages, because they appeared satisfied with their existing "unwholesome" borehole supplies. In Calverton, where pipe-laying was nearly complete, only 125 had signed up for mains water, out of 308 houses.

In July 1935, at a time when outdoor swimming was becoming nationally popular and lidos were being built by local councils, the Spring Water Lido, a 75 feet by 30 feet outdoor pool, was opened on Moor Lane as a private enterprise by two village business men, Messrs. P. Bagguley and A. Roden. Equipped with a diving board, changing facilities and a café, the lido was fed by a natural spring delivering 300 gallons a minute. A Lido Social Club was formed in 1947 which, by 1950, had 1,100 members.

In June 1937 a new cricket pavilion was opened by James Seely (1901–1956) in the same week (as he noted), that he had attended the ceremony of ground-breaking in connection with the new colliery (q.v.). The cricket ground itself had been provided by his grandfather Sir Charles Seely in 1910.

Although it was in 1937 that the first shaft of the mine was sunk, it had been as early as 1910 that borings had taken place at Oxton, Thurgarton and elsewhere, to more accurately determine the extent of the concealed Nottinghamshire coalfield. As a result of the borings, it was expected that coal could be worked profitably in the area, as was already being done at Gedling. In 1921, George Spencer of the Notts Miners Association had asserted that coal was "known to exist" at Calverton. Work started on the colliery in June 1937 with the Seely family's Babbington Colliery Co. beginning the sinking of the shaft that would enable ventilation and "man-riding" to the workings at Bestwood colliery. In 1938, the Babbington Colliery Co. was taken over by the Bestwood Coal and Iron Company which was soon renamed B. A. Collieries Ltd. At about the same time Charles Collyer (who was by now chairman of both Basford Rural Council and the Calverton Parish Council, as well as a Calverton poultry farmer) was in discussions with the Ministry of Health to borrow money to provide sewage disposal works for the village. At that time there were no disposal facilities at all, and the possibility that the mine owners, B.A. Collieries Ltd., might wish to build a colliery village of 500 houses and boost the population from an estimated 1,200, made the talks more urgent. The 527m mine-shaft was completed early in 1939 and by September of that year, various buildings and twenty-two houses of a proposed colliery village had been built, to a design by Geoffrey Jellicoe. The Second World War then brought further work to an abrupt halt.

In 1940 the Trent Fishery Board, a precursor of the Trent River Authority, opened the Calverton Fish Farm with the aim of breeding thousands of fish to stock rivers and still waters around the country. The farm consisted of sheds containing hatching trays and sixty-three ponds in nine units of seven ponds each. The water supply to the ponds was from a spring, by means of a borehole five hundred feet deep. In December 1941, some 12,000 fish, including carp and bream, were brought from the lake at Highfields Park. The farm was already hatching out salmon and trout, and hoped to be fully stocked by 1942.

On 13 October 1940, a Fairey Battle aircraft of No. 300 Polish Bomber Squadron, then operating from RAF Winthorpe, was returning from a raid on Boulogne. Control of the aircraft was lost in fog, and it crashed in woods close to Whinbush Lane (53°03′32.88″N 1°05′55.44″W). A memorial was subsequently erected to the three Polish airmen who were killed.

In the Second World War the village lost eight men, and their names appear on a brass memorial, in St Wilfrid's Church (q.v.).

Work resumed on the mine after the war, and at the sinking of the new shaft in January 1946, B.A. Collieries Ltd. chairman Claude Lancaster M.P said that it was estimated that beneath the surface there might be 125 million tons of coal, which if one thousand men were to produce a million tons every year, would provide employment for 125 years.

In 1949 Councillor Collyer foresaw the development of Calverton from a village of 1,250 people to a "satellite town" of 8,000 by 1960, and he said that the NCB were asking that two thousand miners be housed in the village. The final depth of the new shaft was reached in June 1952 and, on 24 September of that year, Calverton Colliery was officially opened by the Minister for Coordination of Transport, Fuel and Power Lord Leathers. After ventilation and other equipment had been installed, coal winding began in March 1953.

Following the colliery opening, two housing developments were created; the Colliery Estate bounded by Mansfield Lane, Crookdole Lane and Park Road East, and the Council Estate bounded by Park Road, Lee Road and Flatts Lane. In the 1950s the population of Calverton rose sharply from 1,304 in 431 households in 1951, to 5,658 in 1,545 households in 1961. This suggests that some 1,100 houses were built in the period. The Yorkshire Post reported, in February 1954, that collieries in the Mexborough area were being affected by men leaving for Calverton, because they had been promised new houses.

The increase in population necessitated the rapid provision of more school places, and in 1955 Manor Park mixed primary school was opened, followed by William Lee mixed junior school in 1956. In 1957 Colonel Frank Seely School was the next to open. When, in 1960, Sir John Sherbrooke junior school opened its doors, Manor Park became a school for infants only.

In the 1970s and early 1980s the colliery employed some 1,600 workers, but by 1988 this figure had fallen to 1,000, of whom 300 lived in the village. By September 1993, the number had been further reduced to 648, of whom 148 lived in Calverton.

Traditional cottage-based frame-working had died out by the mid- twentieth century, but the link between the village and the hosiery industry was retained, through the presence of a Courtaulds factory on Main Street. The destruction of this factory by fire in 1991, finally ended Calverton's association with the textile industry.

In 1992 British Coal (the successor to the NCB), had announced that the colliery would close, and in November 1993 it raised its offer of redundancy payments to £7,000 per man, on condition that the mine shut down immediately. This was to dissuade workers from opting for a review procedure which would delay matters. This offer was accepted, and the mine shut on 19 November. In December 1994 RJB Mining (now UK Coal) bought the core mining activities of the English coalfields from British Coal for £814 million and reopened four collieries, one of which was Calverton. Less than five years later however, on 9 April 1999, RJB Mining announced the closure of the colliery, citing 'deteriorating geological conditions...(which)... have made it unviable', and production of coal in the village finally ended, a week later, on 16 April.

In the 1960s, further housing had been built in the village, within the boundaries of Crookdole Lane, Bonner Lane, and Park Road East and by 1971 the village numbered 6,283. In the late 1970s and 1980s, there was more housing at the bottom of Bonner Hill and George's Lane and by 2001 there were 6,903 inhabitants in 2,771 households.

=== The 21st Century ===
The 2011 census found 7,076 inhabitants in 2,987 households. A total of 76.8% of these households owned their accommodation outright, or with a mortgage or loan. This compares with 63.4% for England as a whole.

In April 2015, the High Court dismissed a legal bid by Calverton Parish Council to quash a "joint-core strategy" drawn up by Nottingham City Council, Broxtowe Borough Council and Gedling Borough Council, in September 2014, with regard to the building of houses. The parish council had argued that the joint plan was based on a flawed report issued by an inspector, but the High Court said that the inspector had taken an approach that was "both sensible and appropriate" in reaching an evidence-based conclusion that, to meet housing need for the area, some development on green belt land would be necessary. The effect of the ruling is to allow the plans of Gedling Borough Council, to build perhaps one thousand new homes in the parish up, to the year 2028. In consequence, by that time the population of Calverton parish might approach 9,500.

The 2021 census found 7,282 inhabitants in 3,120 households.

After a delay because of COVID restrictions in 2020, a number of new housing developments were started, three to the North of Park Road, and another to the South of Main street. In total around 600 houses and bungalows have been built, with a fifth development about to start at the West end of Main Street.

From 2021 onwards Calverton parish council, under the new chairmanship of councillor Andy Meads, started on an ambitious path of modernisation and development. As well as overhauling the financing and day-to-day operations of the parish council, a continued run of new building projects have been undertaken including refurbishment of buildings like the cemetery chapel and the public toilet block, to major spending and improvements to the two parish council owned parks. James Seely park re-opened in December 2024 after a none-council tax funded investment of over £310,000.00. The most ambitious project to date was the doubling of the size of the already spacious Calverton village hall during 2023, with a large extension, which included new parish offices, a conference room suite, workshop, and three self contained "community units", each with a kitchen and toilets. The original concept was jointly devised by councillors Lorraine Brown and Andy Meads. The plans and project management was all done in house by councillor Andy Meads.

The parish councillor moved out of the old offices and meeting room, the home of the parish council for over 130 years, up to the new extension in December 2023. In early 2024 the whole south facing roof of the village hall was fitted with a 50 kW solar panel system. On the 1st of August 2024 the extension was completed when councillor Lorraine Brown officially handed the keys for the new on site cafe to the new tenant.

Councillor Lorraine Brown instigated the transformation of the site of the disused old pitch and putt field into a new 5 acre wildlife park to the West of William Lee Memorial park.

In 2026 Calverton parish council froze their precept again at £294,634. A zero increase. As a result, residents in Calverton will pay a parish charge for the year of £112.68 for an average Band C property which is the most prevalent band in the village.

Despite having a lower tax base than say neighbouring Ravenshead parish council, Calverton parish council provides far higher services and facilities, including a cemetery and chapel, two public car parks, a public toilet block, the largest village hall facility in the East Midlands, with five kitchens, six sets of toilets, a conference suite, parish offices, two community units, a cafe, main hall, meeting room, six changing rooms with showers and toilets, and finally a workshop. Bowling green, tennis courts, five football pitches, skate park, two extensive public parks, a MUGA, over 90 acres of public park land, a new 16 acre cemetery, a heritage garden, upkeep of the churchyard, and two large allotment sites. There are six full time members of staff.

==== Grant Funding ====
On top of the precept Calverton parish council has received record grant funding over the last few years and been able to spend around half a million pounds on its two public parks without using a penny of council tax money from its residents.

In late 2025 Chairman of Calverton parish council and Gedling borough councillor Andy Meads with the clerk and fellow Gedling borough councillor Jane Allen secured 35% of the total health and wellbeing fund for the whole of Gedling borough, which provided 100% of the cost for a new clubhouse for Calverton bowling club and new pétanque courts.

==== 2025 Gedling Borough Council By-Election ====
There was a by-election in July 2025 due to death of Conservative councillor Lorraine Brown. Andy Meads was approached by the Conservative Party to stand for them but chose to stand as an independent. Despite challenging all the major parties, which all put huge resources into the campaign, and suffering constant online abuse and fake derogatory stories spread by a scam Facebook page, Andy Meads recorded the biggest by-election landslide in UK politics since 1994, with 66% of the vote, whilst the conservatives were demoted to 4th place at 6%. Labour got 8% and Reform, whilst at their peak only managed 18%. Councillor Meads recorded the highest ever vote for a Calverton Gedling Borough councillor and by a huge margin, double other Nottinghamshire county council by-election results at the same time and even more votes than the Calverton county councillor which had double the voters available, because that seat also includes Woodborough, Lambley and Gedling.

==== Public Works Loans ====
Four out of twelve parish councils within Gedling Borough have borrowed funds from the Public Works Loans Board to finance their projects. Ravenshead being the latest with a sizeable loan.

As of 31 August 2025, Calverton parish council was one of the four that had loans, two of which are older than most of the current parish councillors, with repayment dates between 2048 and 2068. The older two loans are for the village hall built in 2015 and the parish land purchased in 2018. The only loan taken out since 2019 was for the village hall extension. The investment has proved highly profitable. The loan was by most public works loans, taken over a relative short time, the loan repayment is £24,000 a year but this loan has increased income by £59,000 per year, and also provided many none financial benefits. One of the older two loans, for the parish land, under the efforts of councillor Meads is now seeing its payments entirely paid for by new income from that land, and also leaving a £6,200 per year surplus.

== Governance ==
Calverton has a parish council which is the lowest tier of local government, higher levels of services are managed by Gedling Borough Council and Nottinghamshire County Council. The parish is within the Calverton ward for district purposes, Calverton electoral division for county elections, and in the Sherwood Forest constituency for UK parliament elections.

== Geography ==
=== Placement and size ===
Calverton parish is surrounded by the following local places: Ravenshead, Blidworth and Oxton to the north, Arnold, Nottingham and Woodborough to the south, Epperstone to the east, Hucknall, Papplewick and Bestwood Village to the west.

The parish is 6.63 sq mi (17.2 km^{2}; 1,720 ha) square miles in area, within the north eastern portion of Gedling borough, and to the centre south of Nottinghamshire county. The parish is roughly bounded by land features such as Blidworth Wood to the north, Sansom Wood and the A60 road to the west, Lamp Wood and Bonner Hill to the south, with the Dover Beck, Oxton Bogs and Salterford Dam to the east.

=== Ramsdale Hill ===
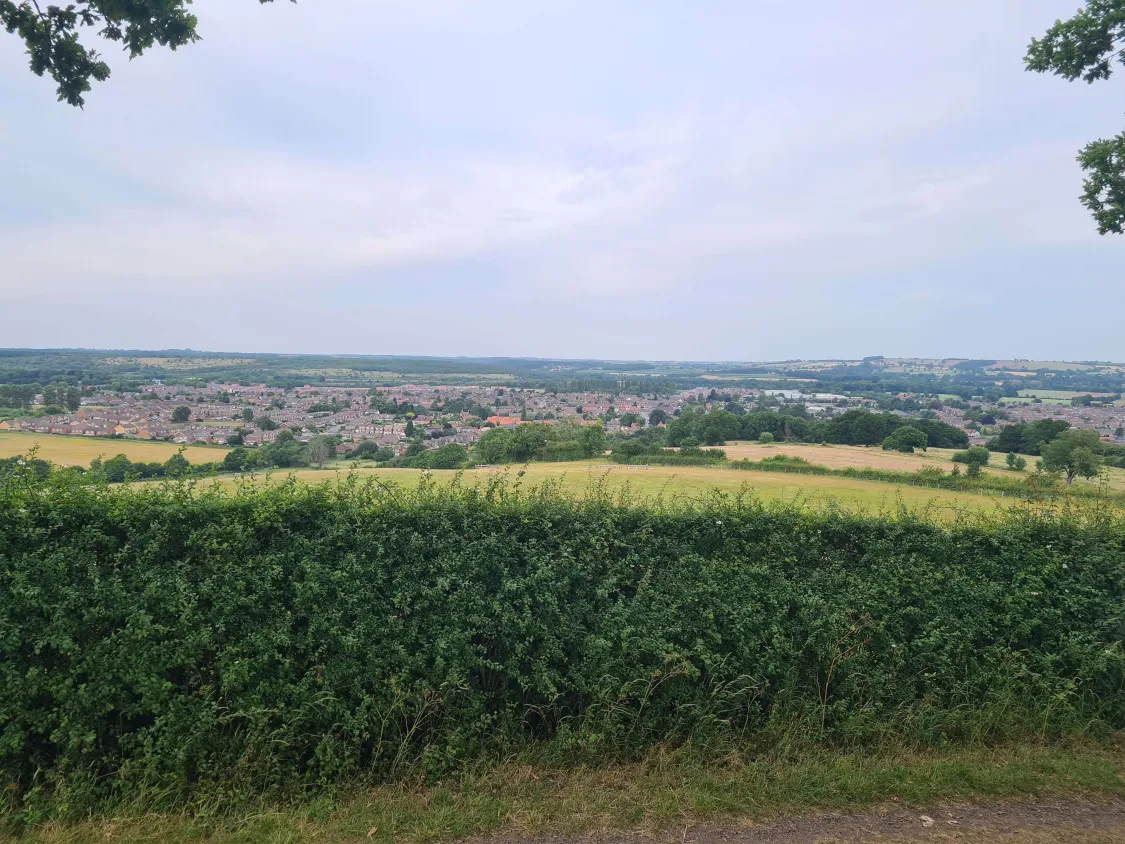
Calverton From Spindle Lane

The village varies between 45–85 metres (148–279 ft), the highest point in the parish is along the south-western boundary by Ramsdale Hill, at ~155 metres (509 ft) above sea level.

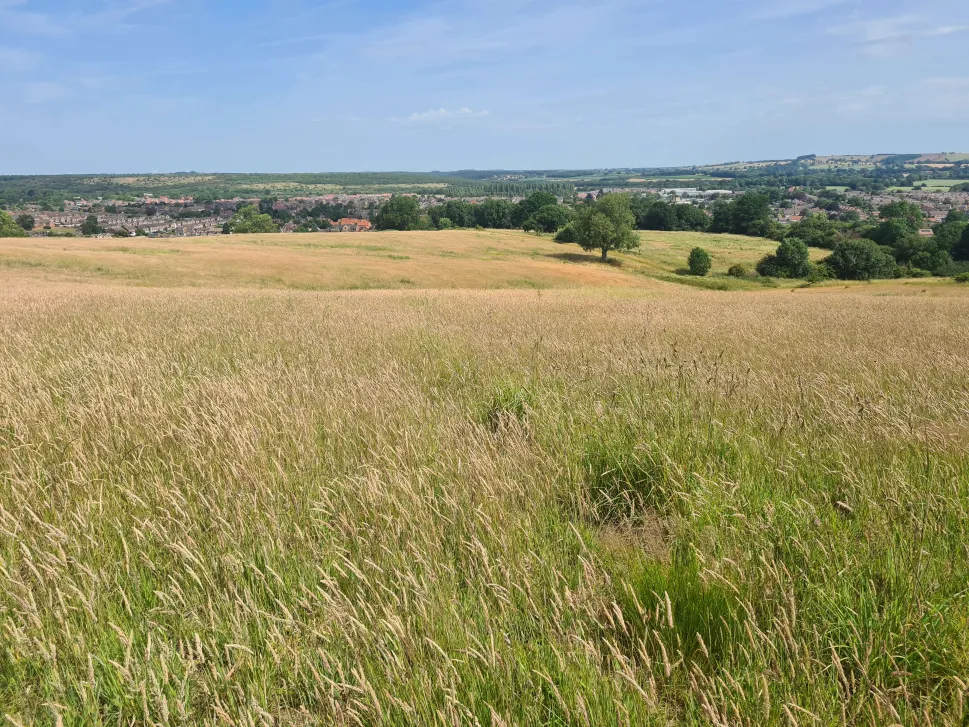
The view of Calverton from Ramsdale Hill

The hill is immediately south of Calverton, and is situated in between Calverton and Dorket Head. Fox Woods sits on the hill, just along a footpath which leads to Georges Lane, which in turn heads into Arnold. The woods are said to have been the site of a Roman encampment, one of two in and around the village, and were also apparently used as a stashing point for Robin Hood, however these are only tales and cannot be verified as fact.

== Demographics ==
At the 2021 census. 7,282 residents were reported within the civil parish. This was a 3% increase from the 2011 census, which counted a population of 7,076, of whom, according to the Office for National Statistics:

	Calverton (parish)	Gedling (Non-Metropolitan District)	England
Age
Median age	43	42	39
Under 18	20.3%	20.5%	21.4%
Over 65	18.4%	17.0%	16.4%
Ethnic group
White British	97.0%	90.3%	79.8%
White Other	1.1%	2.7%	5.7%
Mixed/Multiple	1.0%	2.3%	2.2%
Asian or British Asian	0.7%	3.0%	7.7%
Black or Black British	0.1%	1.4%	3.4%
Other ethnic group	0.0%	0.3%	1.0%
Religion
Christian	62.9%	57.1%	59.4%
Buddhist	0.2%	0.3%	0.5%
Hindu	0.3%	0.5%	1.5%
Jewish	0.0%	0.1%	0.5%
Muslim	0.2%	1.4%	5.0%
Sikh	0.1%	0.6%	0.8%
Another religion	0.3%	0.3%	0.4%
No religion	29.3%	32.7%	24.7%
Did not answer	6.7%	7.1%	7.2%

== Community ==
Local facilities and amenities include a working mens club, public houses, playgrounds, sports grounds, children's centre, library, shopping precinct, medical centre, post office, miners welfare centre, caravan park, church and cemetery, leisure centre, village hall, art gallery, war memorial and industrial estate.

== Landmarks ==
=== Conservation ===
Calverton parish contains 17 listed buildings that are recorded in the National Heritage List for England. Of these, St Wilfrid's Church is listed at Grade II*, the others are at Grade II and comprise houses and cottages including former knitters' cottages, a former hosiery factory, a war memorial, along with farmhouses and associated structures.

== Education ==
Calverton has a secondary-level school, Colonel Frank Seely Academy in the centre of the village. Primary and infant schools include Sir John Sherbrooke Junior, St Wilfrids CofE, Salterford House and Manor Park Infant and Nursery.

== Religious sites ==
=== Church of St. Wilfrid ===
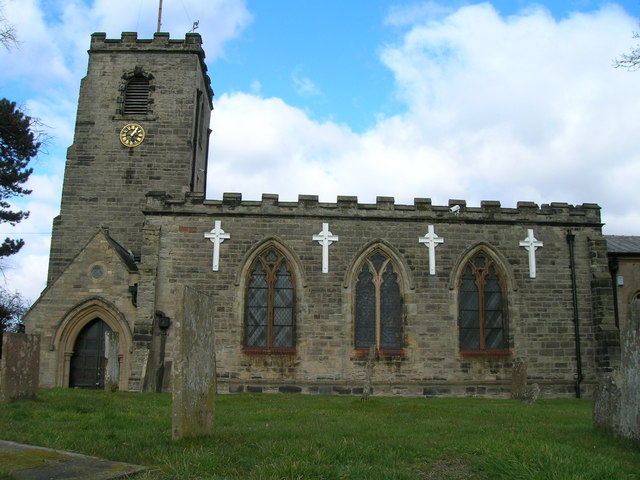
St Wilfrid's Church

St Wilfrid's is an Anglican church that seems to date, for the most part, from the fourteenth century, when it may have been reconstructed with material from an older building.

The nave and tower were rebuilt in 1760–63, and over the west door is a commemorative stone 'Mr. Pugh, Vicar, Saml. Pugh, Ino.Barrett, Church Wardens, Wm.Barrett, mason'. In 1835 the chancel was reconstructed, and in 1881 the whole church was restored.

The nave has the somewhat unusual form of a wide parallelogram 42 feet 8 inches long and 37 feet 2 inches wide, of one span and with no traces of any arcades. The chancel arch is not in the centre of the east wall of the nave, but about five feet nearer to the north side. This has led to the suggestion that when the building was rebuilt in the 1760s, the south wall of the nave was moved further south to enlarge the building.

Carved into the capital of the north jamb is a small, 3" by 4", panel containing a three-quarter length depiction of a bearded bishop together with another figure. It is perhaps St Wilfrid himself, either with a newly baptised convert or, as the freeing of slaves was a distinguishing feature of the bishop's career, in the act of manumission.

=== Other sites ===
Alternative denominations in the village are the Baptists that have a chapel, Methodists have a place of worship and St Anthony's Chapel of Ease is a Catholic building.

== Sport ==
Sports and leisure locations or groups include:

- Calverton Leisure Centre
- Calverton Cricket Club
- Ramsdale Park Golf Club
- Springwater Golf Club
- Oakmere Park Golf Club
- Arnold Eagles Girls and Ladies Football Club
- Calverton Miners Welfare Colts FC

== Notable people ==
- William Lee (1563—1614), inventor
- General Sir John Coape Sherbrooke, GCB (1764—1830), army general
- Ellen Sulley Fray (1832—1903), British/American social reformer
- John Collyer (1840—1876), architect
- Amos Hind (1849—1931), cricketer
- John Michael Moore (1943—2009), footballer
- Russell John Evans (1965—2017), cricketer and umpire
- Peter James Taylor FBA FAcSS (born 1944), geographer
- Christopher Dean OBE (born 27 July 1958), ice dancer
