= West Bay Opera =

West Bay Opera is an opera company located in Palo Alto, California. Established in 1955, West Bay Opera is the second oldest continuously running opera company in California (after San Francisco Opera).

José Luis Moscovich is the current general director of West Bay Opera.

== History ==
West Bay Opera was founded in 1955 by Henry Holt who had recently completed his training in piano performance and conducting at Vienna, and after a successful career in Europe where his final performance was as a soloist with Arturo Toscanini conducting the Vienna Philharmonic. The opera company was established first as an opera workshop named the "Little Opera Guild" with operatic works were performed with piano as the accompaniment. These workshops quickly evolved into full staged productions with major singers from the San Francisco Bay Area in the principal roles and local residents as the chorus.

After Henry Holt's passing in 1969, West Bay Opera was led by Henry's wife, Maria Holt, as the general director of the company until the late 1990s. During this time, West Bay Opera grew significantly with more major productions featuring world-class singers professional singers, directors, and artists, as well as the West Bay Opera Orchestra which was established in 1974. The opera company is housed at the Holt Building (in Palo Alto) which provides the company with its administrative offices as well as facilities for rehearsals, a consume shop, and set and properties storage.

== Productions ==
West Bay Opera offers three productions per season, one each in October, February, and May. Its programming includes standard popular operas as well as known but less often performed masterpieces.

Recent major production accomplishments include Bellini's Norma, Tchaikovsky's Eugene Onegin (in the original Russian), Wagner's Der fliegende Holländer, and Verdi's La Forza del Destino. More recently, West Bay Opera has taken on productions that are often performed in Europe but are less frequent in the United States, such as Gluck's Orfeo ed Euridice and von Weber's Der Freischütz, both with formidable reviews.

All productions include projected supertitles in English.
