= Wilfred Flowers =

English cricketer

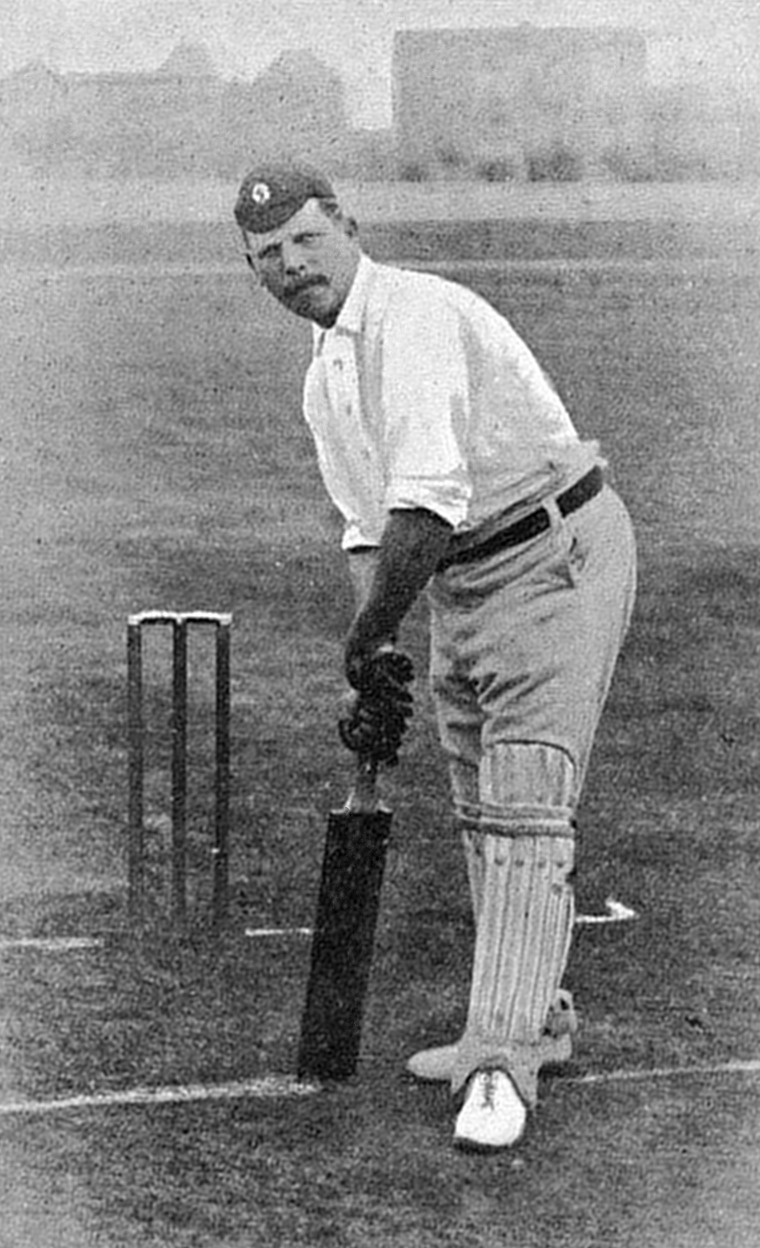
- Flowers pictured in the 1890s

Personal information
- Born: 7 December 1856; Calverton, Nottinghamshire, England
- Died: 1 November 1926 (aged 69); Calverton, Nottinghamshire, England
- Batting: Right-handed
- Bowling: Right-arm off-break

International information
- National side: England
- Test debut (cap 48): 12 December 1884 v Australia
- Last Test: 19 July 1893 v Australia

Career statistics
Competition	Test	First-class
Matches	8	442
Runs scored	254	12,891
Batting average	18.14	20.07
100s/50s	0/1	9/56
Top score	56	173
Balls bowled	858	56,375
Wickets	14	1,188
Bowling average	21.14	15.89
5 wickets in innings	1	73
10 wickets in match	0	15
Best bowling	5/46	8/22
Catches/stumpings	2/–	222/–
- Source: CricketArchive, 20 April 2019

Wilfred Flowers (1856–1926) was a professional cricketer who played for Nottinghamshire County Cricket Club between 1877 and 1896.

== Cricket career ==
born 7 December 1856 in Calverton, Nottinghamshire, England, Flowers was a slow bowler, who bowled offbreaks and a strong batsman who was one of the leading all-rounders of his day. He first played for Nottinghamshire in 1877, and established himself slowly in a very strong team despite being known to be unplayable on a sticky wicket. In 1881, however, a players’ strike devastated Nottinghamshire and Flowers, seen as a player with less resolve than Alfred Shaw, Fred Morley, Arthur Shrewsbury, and John Selby, was approached by county officials and took advantage of the opportunity to become much more important in the redevelopment of the county. Flowers took such advantage of this that in 1882 he took one hundred wickets for the first time. His batting, which had been not outstanding but valuable in an era of very low scoring, developed greatly the following year, in which Flowers became the first professional to do the double of 1,000 runs and 100 wickets. Playing for the Marylebone Cricket Club (MCC) against Derbyshire, Flowers had the outstanding record of an innings of 131 and eleven wickets for eighty-seven runs.

He bettered this for the same club against Cambridge the following year, scoring 122 and taking fourteen wickets for 160 runs, and despite not doing quite so well with either bat or ball was still good enough to tour Australia with Alfred Shaw's teams in 1884–85. However, not physically strong enough for the hotter climate and drier wickets of Australia, Flowers only rarely, as when taking five for 46 in the Third Test and eight for 31 in the first match on a rain-damaged wicket, lived up to his English form. He did maintain his form well enough to tour again in 1886–87, but this time Flowers did very little worthy of his reputation. Even at county level, Flowers was increasingly overshadowed, especially in dry weather, by the physically hardier William Attewell. Nor did his batting advance during a succession of wet summers, but in the dry season of 1893 Flowers reached a four-figure run aggregate for only the second time. In the process he played an innings of 130 against the touring Australians including Charles Turner, George Giffen and Hugh Trumble, and was thus unsuccessfully picked for his last Test at Lord's, where he made 35 but was omitted in favour of Johnny Briggs who was bowling immensely better at county level.

Flowers still bowled well in 1894, but in the dry weather of 1895 his bowling lost him: in his final season of 1896 he was put on for only twenty overs. He did achieve the notable feat of scoring a century in his last match against Sussex.

Flowers was awarded a benefit match in 1899, but the match between Middlesex and Somerset at Lords turned out to be a financial disaster. The match was finished in just over 3 hours, making it the shortest first-class match ever played.

== Post-retirement ==
After retiring as a player, Flowers served as an umpire from 1907 to 1912.

Flowers was married to Martha, and was a frame work knitter, and later a lacehand, by trade. At birth, he was registered as Wilfred Flower. His cousin Thomas Flowers also played first-class cricket. Flowers died 1 November 1926 in Carlton, Nottinghamshire, England
