= John Flowers (cricketer) =

English cricketer

Personal information
- Full name: John Flowers
- Born: 5 October 1882; Shoreham-by-Sea, Sussex, England
- Died: 8 May 1968 (aged 85); Brighton, Sussex, England
- Batting: Unknown
- Bowling: Unknown

Domestic team information
- Years: Team
- 1905: Sussex

Career statistics
Competition	First-class
Matches	2
Runs scored	9
Batting average	3.00
100s/50s	–/–
Top score	5
Balls bowled	54
Wickets	–
Bowling average	–
5 wickets in innings	–
10 wickets in match	–
Best bowling	–
Catches/stumpings	–/–
- Source: Cricinfo, 15 March 2012

John Flowers (5 October 1882 – 8 May 1968) was an English cricketer. Flowers' batting and bowling styles are unknown. He was born at Shoreham-by-Sea, Sussex.

Flowers made two first-class appearances for Sussex against Somerset and Gloucestershire in the 1905 County Championship. Against Somerset at the Recreation Ground, Bath, Sussex won the toss and elected to bat first, making 141 in their first-innings, during which Flowers was dismissed for 3 runs by Percy Hardy. Somerset made 289 in their first-innings, during which Flowers bowled nine wicketless overs, conceding 59 runs. Due to poor weather, neither side managed a second-innings, with the match ending in a draw. In his second match against Gloucestershire at the Ashley Down Ground, Bristol, which directly followed the match against Somerset, Sussex won the toss and elected to bat first, making 238 in their first-innings, during which Flowers was dismissed for a single run by George Dennett. Gloucestershire responded in their first-innings by making 181, with Sussex then collapsing in their second-innings to 95 all out, with Flowers being dismissed by the same bowler for 5 runs. Gloucestershire won the match by 5 wickets.

He died at Brighton, Sussex, on 8 May 1968.
