= Flor Alba Núñez Vargas =

Flor Alba Nunez Vargas
- Born: ca. 1990; Colombia
- Died: 10 September 2015; Pitalito, Huila, Colombia
- Cause of death: Gun shot to the head
- Occupation: Journalist
- Employer: La Perferida FM
- Known for: Journalism and for her reports on crime and drug trafficking
- Title: Broadcast radio & TV journalist

Flor Alba Núñez Vargas (ca. 1990 – 10 September 2015), a Colombian journalist with La Preferida Estero radio station and several TV stations, was murdered in Pitalito, Huila Department, Colombia, where she received death threats before her murder.

== Career ==
Núñez was well-known as local radio host for her daily news program "Red Noticias" with La Perferida Estero station in Pitalito.

She also worked for the local Pitalito Channel 6, Nación TV out of Neiva and La Nación newspaper. She had received death threats throughout her career, and one of the most notable was in 2015 after she reported on an animal abuse incident. Before her murder, she had posted several controversial reports on her social media accounts including comments from a Catholic bishop on corruption and images of a local gang.

== Death ==
Pitalito is in Colombia and shown here relative to the capital city of Bogotá.

Flor Alba Núñez Vargas was murdered around noon on 10 September 2015. She was shot in the back of the head while unlocking the door to the radio station she worked at in Pitalito, Colombia. The murder was caught by a surveillance camera.

The government offered a reward for information regarding the murder. The reward offered was 55 million peso, which is equivalent to about $18,000.

The gunman was identified as Juan Camilo Ortiz, who was arrested on 26 September 2015, in Palmiros. Ortiz was already a known criminal with a history of trouble before the murder of Núñez. He had been accused of attempted murder before, and he previously served over two years in prison for illegally possessing firearms. He was found guilty on 11 August 2017, and received the sentence of 47 years and 6 months. Jaumeth Albeiro Flórez (a.k.a. Chory) was identified as the motorcycle driver.

== Context ==
Núñez was known for her reporting about arrests and drug traffickers. She received threats over some of her coverage, although she never officially reported any threats.

According to Fundación para la Libertad de Prensa, there are three main speculations as to why Núñez was murdered. The first speculation involves coverage over a recent gang robbery. Núñez received death threats for this coverage. The second possible reason for the murder revolves around her local election coverage, which also produced threats. The third reason involves pictures and an interview of men who hanged a dog after it attacked them.

== Impact ==
In 2015, the Foundation for Press Freedom reported an increase in attacks numbering 150, which amounted to the largest number of attacks in 6 years, and over 70 journalists experienced threats.

According to the Committee to Protect Journalists, Flor Alba Núñez Vargas was the third journalist, along with Luis Carlos Peralta Cuellar and Edgar Quintero, all killed in Colombia in 2015.

== Reactions ==
Irina Bokova, director-general of UNESCO, said, “I condemn the killing of Flor Alba Núñez Vargas. A free press and a free society go hand in hand, attacks on the one weaken the other, so I urge the authorities to do everything to investigate this crime and bring those responsible for it to justice.”

There had been many previous murders of unprotected journalists who reported about corruption, violence, and drugs. In Colombia, in 2015, after the murder of Núñez Vargas, there had been 84 filed violations of press freedom with 126 victims. These high numbers made officials call out for and urge the safety of journalists unlike they have previously. Flor Alba Nunez Vargas's death was tragic, but it serves as another step towards protecting journalists in Colombia.

== See also ==
- Human rights in Colombia
