= Fleur Revell =

New Zealand journalist

Fleur Revell-Devlin
- Born: Fleur Revell; 14 March 1972 (age 53); Blenheim, New Zealand
- Occupations: Journalist, television presenter, public relations consultant

Fleur Revell-Devlin (born Fleur Revell, 14 March 1972) is a New Zealand public relations consultant and former television personality and journalist.

== Career ==
Revell-Devlin worked as a police reporter at Auckland's Western Leader. She was later employed as a senior reporter for the Sunday Star-Times.

Revell-Devlin worked as a reporter and producer on TVNZ's ONE News, Sportsnight and Breakfast, before becoming a presenter on a number of television shows for both TVNZ and TV3 including Revell with a Cause, Destination Planet Earth, and Car Crazy.

Revell-Devlin worked for nine months as editor at women’s magazine New Idea.

Revell-Devlin is a co-director of a public relations company Impact PR, which she runs with Mark Devlin.
