= Don Flora =

American volleyball coach

Coaching career (HC unless noted)
- 1998–2008: La Verne
- 2009–2010: New Mexico State (assistant)
- 2011–2015: Texas Tech

Head coaching record
- Overall: 336–146

Don Flora (born September 9, 1968) was a head coach of the Texas Tech Red Raiders volleyball team. Flora became the head coach on January 7, 2011, replacing Trish Kissiar-Knight. Prior to coming to Texas Tech, he served as an assistant coach with the New Mexico State Aggies from 2009 to 2010 and as the head coach at the University of La Verne from 1998 to 2008. On December 2, 2015, Flora was dismissed from his coaching job at Texas Tech.
