= John Moore (footballer, born February 1943) =

English footballer

Personal information
- Full name: John Michael Moore
- Date of birth: 1 February 1943
- Place of birth: Carlton, Nottinghamshire, England
- Date of death: 4 November 2009 (aged 66)
- Place of death: Calverton, Nottinghamshire, England
- Positions: Winger; forward

Senior career*
Years	Team	Apps	(Gls)
–	Arnold St Mary's		
1961–1965	Lincoln City	30	(5)
1965–1968	Arnold		
1968	Ilkeston Town	3	(1)
- * Club domestic league appearances and goals

John Michael Moore (1 February 1943 – 4 November 2009) was an English footballer who made 30 appearances in the Football League for Lincoln City. He played as a winger or forward. Moore also played non-league football in the east Midlands, including appearing in the Midland Counties League for Arnold and Ilkeston Town.
