= Flore Maltine Ramarozatovo =

Malagasy politician

Flore Meltine Ramarozatovo is a Malagasy politician. A member of the National Assembly of Madagascar, she was elected as a member of the Tiako I Madagasikara party in the 2007 Malagasy parliamentary election. She represented the constituency of Soavinandriana.
