= Richmond Flowers =

Richmond Flowers may refer to:

- Richmond Flowers Sr. (1918–2007), Alabama's Attorney General
- Richmond Flowers Jr. (born 1947), American football player
- Richmond Flowers III (born 1978), American football wide receiver from the 2001 NFL draft
