= Lannie Flowers =

American musician

Lannie Flowers is an American power pop musician from Kennedale, Texas.

At age twelve, Lannie became infatuated with the guitar. He attempted to attend university, but eventually dropped out and pursued his dream of living life as a musician. Lannie's influences feature T. Rex, David Bowie, and Mott the Hoople. Lannie is currently residing in Kennedale, Texas with his wife Linda, and daughter.

== The Pengwins ==
Lannie Flowers’ formed The Pengwins while he was in high school (1976) and lasted until the early 1990s. The story behind the name The Pengwins, comes from up "when the band was asked about a song they were playing and the bass player said they were going to have sixty-nine penguins singing in the background and for some reason, the name just stuck." The Pengwins’ members include Lannie Flowers guitar and vocals, Alan Petsche with guitar and vocals, Delbert Raines bassist, and Danny Wilkerson the drummer. The Pengwin's first album includes "Life After High School", produced by Fabb Records in 1978, showcasing the song "Life After High School". In 1981, The Pengwins contributed another album titled Small Vacation, by Artic Records. In 1988, The Pengwins constructed another album "Mad About the Band", produced by Circle Records. Their most recent album contains "Life After High School", in 2004 by Aaron Avenue Records. Songs on the album contain "It’s a Dream", "Look Around You", and "Suicide". The Pengwins recorded with Rick Derringer at Bearsville Studios in New York and in Memphis with producer Jim Dickinson, and by Columbia and Polygram.

== Lannie Flowers' Revival ==
A former bandmate from The Pengwins days, Alan Petsche, told Lannie he wanted to put the record on his Aaron Avenue Records label. "I had a few reservations about it because I didn't know if there would be an audience for it." Lannie’s music caught on to people around the world from all over the globe and permitted Lannie to record a second CD.

== Solo Project ==
Lannie Flowers’ solo projects include "Same Old Story", produced by Aaron Avenue Records, in 2008. Songs on the album feature "By Your Side", "You’re Not Going Anywhere", and "Thanks a lot for Nothing", comprised up to 36 songs. "Several years ago I realized I had a lot of unfinished songs that I probably was never going to finish." Lastly, Lannie Flowers’ most recent album include "Circles", produced by Aaron Avenue Records in 2010. Songs on the album up to 15 songs that incorporate "Around the World", "Where Does Love Go", and "All Dressed Up". Lannie Flowers’ band members include Lannie Flowers as the lead guitarist, with Alan Davis as the guitarist as well as the keyboard player, Rodney Bollinger another guitarist, Neil Schnell accompanying the bass, and Brandon Bumpas playing the drums and keyboard.

== Tours ==
Lannie Flowers has toured in England. Also they have toured and all over the United States from Texas to Hawaii to Alaska. Lannie Flowers is currently touring at the International Pop Overthrow Festival in Austin, Texas, Dallas, Texas, and New York, New York.

== Music videos ==
"Looking For You" and "Around the World" from the 2010 album Circles in 2010.
