= Flora (surname) =

Flora is a surname. It may refer to:

- Alessandra Flora (born 1975), Italian lyricist and composer
- Dom Flora, American college basketball player
- Don Flora, American volleyball coach
- Ioana Flora (born 1975), Romanian actress
- Jerry Flora, American college football coach
- Jim Flora, American illustrator
- Snowden D. Flora, American meteorologist, climatologist and tornado researcher
- Vaughn Flora (1945-2022), American politician
