= John Flower (cricketer) =

English cricketer (born 1938)

John Flower (born 7 November 1938) was an English cricketer. He was a right-handed batsman and a right-arm medium-fast bowler who played for Berkshire. He was born in Berkshire.

Flower, who made his Minor Counties Championship debut for the team in 1964, made his only List A appearance the following year, in the 1965 Gillette Cup, against Somerset. From the lower order, Flower scored a single run.
