= Johnny Flowers =

American baseball player

- Outfielder
- Batted: Right Threw: Right

Negro league baseball debut
- 1941, for the New York Black Yankees

Last appearance
- 1946, for the New York Black Yankees
- Stats at Baseball Reference

Teams
- New York Black Yankees (1941–1943, 1946)

John Flowers, also known as "Jake", is an American former Negro league baseball outfielder who played in the 1940s.

Flowers played for the New York Black Yankees from 1941 to 1943, and again in 1946. In 15 recorded games, he posted 17 hits and seven RBI in 43 plate appearances. Flowers served as a corporal in the US Army during World War II.
