= Larry Flowers =

Larry Flowers may refer to:

- Larry Flowers (American football) (born 1958), former professional American football player
- Larry L. Flowers (born 1952), former Republican member of the Ohio House of Representatives
