= William Flower =

William Flower may refer to:

- William Flower (officer of arms) (c. 1498–1588), herald, Norroy King of Arms in the reign of Elizabeth I of England
- William Flower (martyr), burnt 1555 during the Marian Persecutions
- William Flower, 1st Baron Castle Durrow (1685–1746), Irish peer and MP for Kilkenny County and Portarlington
- William Henry Flower (1831–1899), English comparative anatomist and surgeon
- William Way (c. 1560–1588), alias William Flower, Catholic martyr executed at Kingston upon Thames
