= Flor Joosen =

Belgian businessman (born 1952)

- Born: 30 June 1952 (age 74); Turnhout
- Education: Graduated in economics at the Instituut voor Hoger Niet-Universitaire Studies

Flor Joosen (born Turnhout, 30 June 1952) is a Belgian businessman, who became well known for his caviar business. Since 1 July 2007, he is also president of UNIZO.

== Education ==
Flor Joosen graduated in economics at the Instituut voor Hoger Niet-Universitaire Studies (IHNUS) in Ghent.

== Career ==
Flor Joosen descends from a family of millers, and the windmill in the Bokrijk museum is an old mill of the Joosen family business.

He started his career in the family business for cattle (Joosen-Luyckx) and fish feed (Joosen-Luyckx Aqua Bio). Later on, he became active in poultry with Belki, a poultry slaughterhouse.

In the 1980s, he wanted to improve on the fish feed and contacted Willy Verdonck at the Katholieke Universiteit Leuven. Out of this contact grew a fishfarm, which was the basis for a sturgeon nursery, and which led to the caviar business in the early 1990s.

== Sources ==
- Kaviaarkweker Flor Joosen nieuwe voorzitter Unizo (in Dutch)
- Flor Joosen nieuwe Unizo-voorzitter (in Dutch)
- Flor Joosen benoemd tot nieuwe Unizo-voorzitter (in Dutch)
