= Jerry Flora =

American football coach

Playing career
- 1988–1991: Iona
- Position: Offensive tackle

Coaching career (HC unless noted)
- 1992–1996: Iona (WR)
- 1997: Fairleigh Dickinson–Florham (OL)
- 1998–2001: Iona (WR)
- 2002–2007: William Paterson (assistant)
- 2008–2017: William Paterson

Head coaching record
- Overall: 33–67

Jerry Flora is an American football coach. He was the head football coach at William Paterson University in Wayne Township, New Jersey from 2008 to 2017, compiling a record of 33–67. He was replaced by Dustin Johnson following the 2017 season.

== Head coaching record ==
Year	Team	Overall	Conference	Standing	Bowl/playoffs
William Paterson Pioneers (New Jersey Athletic Conference) (2008–2017)
2008	William Paterson	4–6	3–6	7th	
2009	William Paterson	5–5	4–5	5th	
2010	William Paterson	4–6	3–6	7th	
2011	William Paterson	4–6	3–6	T–7th	
2012	William Paterson	5–5	2–5	7th	
2013	William Paterson	3–7	1–6	T–7th	
2014	William Paterson	4–6	2–5	T–5th	
2015	William Paterson	2–8	1–8	9th	
2016	William Paterson	2–8	1–8	T–9th	
2017	William Paterson	0–10	0–9	10th	
William Paterson:		33–67	20–64		
Total:		33–67			
