= Thomas Flowers (cricketer, born 1988) =

English cricketer

Personal information
- Full name: Thomas Oliver Flowers
- Born: 26 January 1988 (age 38); Leicester, Leicestershire, England
- Nickname: Tom
- Batting: Right-handed
- Bowling: Right-arm off break

Domestic team information
- Years: Team
- 2011–present: Dorset
- 2008: Loughborough UCCE

Career statistics
Competition	First-class
Matches	2
Runs scored	51
Batting average	25.50
100s/50s	–/–
Top score	25*
Balls bowled	–
Wickets	–
Bowling average	–
5 wickets in innings	–
10 wickets in match	–
Best bowling	–
Catches/stumpings	1/–
- Source: Cricinfo, 30 May 2011

Thomas Oliver Flowers (born 26 January 1988) is an English cricketer. Flowers is a right-handed batsman who bowls right-arm off break. He was born in Leicester, Leicestershire.

Flowers made his first-class debut for Loughborough UCCE against Surrey in 2008. In this match he scored 4 runs before being dismissed by Saqlain Mushtaq. He appeared in a further first-class match in 2008, against Gloucestershire. In this match, he scored 22 runs in Loughborough's first-innings, before being dismissed by David Brown. In their second-innings he scored an unbeaten 25 runs.

Flowers made his debut for Dorset in the 2011 MCCA Knockout Trophy against Oxfordshire.

Since his spell with Leicestershire County Cricket Club, he went on to be a successful Level 4 ECB qualified coach and master in charge of cricket at Sherborne Boys School, Dorset, where he also taught geography.

In 2015, Flowers set up his own independent cricket coaching business based in Leicestershire and Rutland, providing a range of coaching services to the area.
