= Thomas Flowers (cricketer, born 1868) =

English cricketer and umpire

Personal information
- Full name: Thomas Flowers
- Born: 25 October 1868; Daybrook, Nottinghamshire, England
- Died: 26 March 1939 (aged 70); Nottingham, Nottinghamshire, England
- Batting: Right-handed
- Bowling: Right-arm slow-medium
- Relatives: Wilfred Flowers (cousin)

Domestic team information
- Years: Team
- 1894: Nottinghamshire

Umpiring information
- FC umpired: 187 (1914–1926)

Career statistics
Competition	First-class
Matches	1
Runs scored	16
Batting average	8.00
100s/50s	–/–
Top score	11
Balls bowled	30
Wickets	–
Bowling average	–
5 wickets in innings	–
10 wickets in match	–
Best bowling	–
Catches/stumpings	–/–
- Source: Cricinfo, 20 February 2013

Thomas Flowers (25 October 1868 – 26 March 1939) was an English cricketer and umpire. Flowers was a right-handed batsman who bowled right-arm slow-medium. He was born at Daybrook, Arnold, Nottinghamshire.

Flowers made a single first-class appearance for Nottinghamshire against Gloucestershire in the 1894 County Championship at the Spa Ground, Gloucester. In a match which Gloucestershire won by 43 runs, he scored 5 runs in Nottinghamshire's first-innings before being dismissed by Herbert Brown, while in their second-innings he was dismissed for 11 runs by W. G. Grace. He also played extensively in the Lancashire League for Church Cricket Club, making 324 appearances between 1893 and 1908. He also had an extensive career as an umpire, first standing in a first-class match in 1914. He continued to umpire in first-class cricket after the First World War, umpiring in 187 matches to 1926.

He died at Nottingham, Nottinghamshire on 26 March 1939. His cousin Wilfred Flowers played Test cricket for England.
