= Michael Flowers =

Michael Flowers may refer to:

- Michael Flowers (basketball) (born 1999), American basketball player
- Michael C. Flowers, U.S. Army officer
- Mike City (born Michael Flowers), American singer, songwriter and record producer

== See also ==
- The Mike Flowers Pops, a British easy-listening band fronted by Mike Flowers (real name Mike Roberts)
