= Epperstone =

Village and civil parish in Nottinghamshire, England

Coordinates: 53.0300°N 1.0291°W

- Village and civil parish
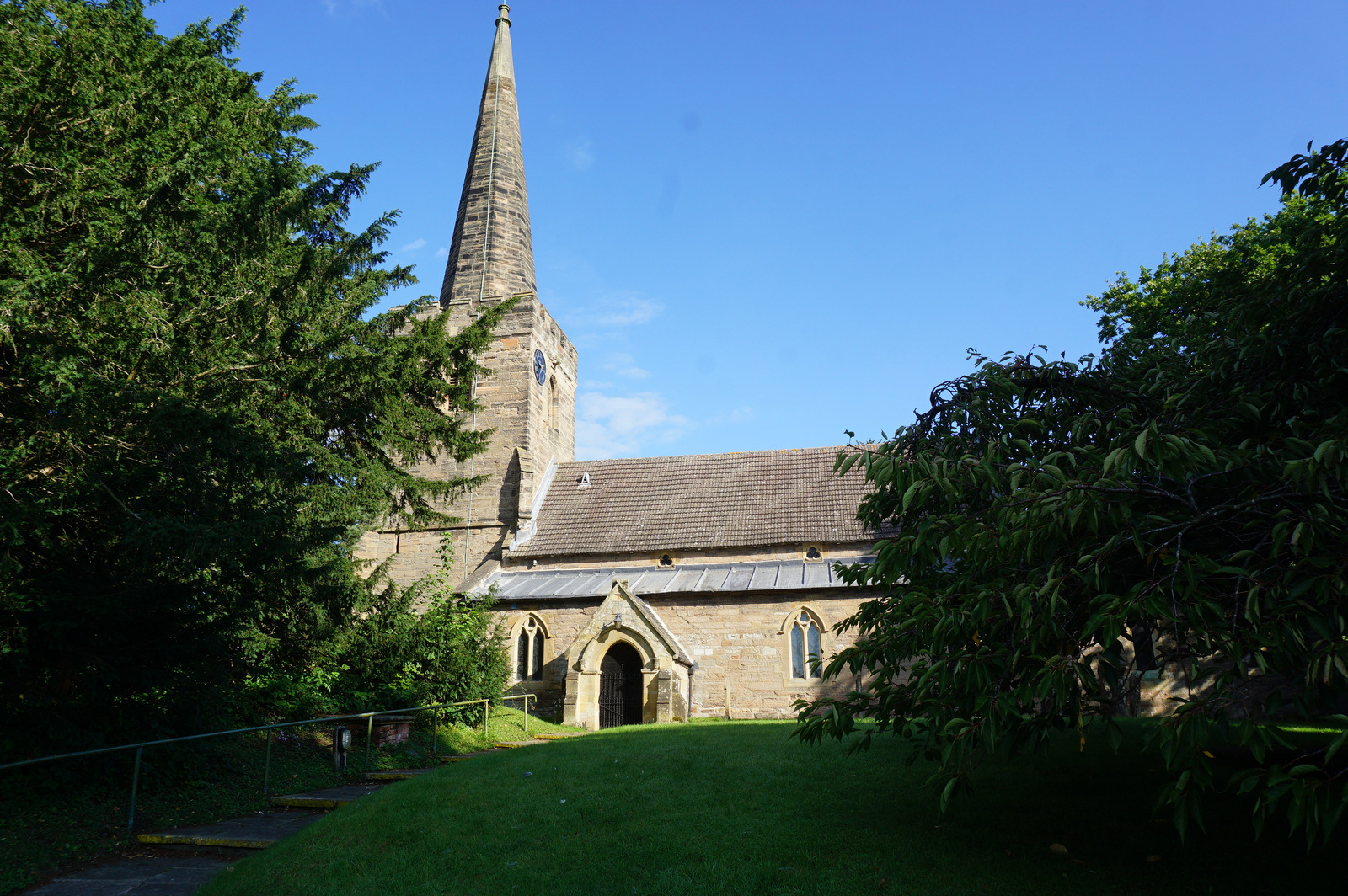
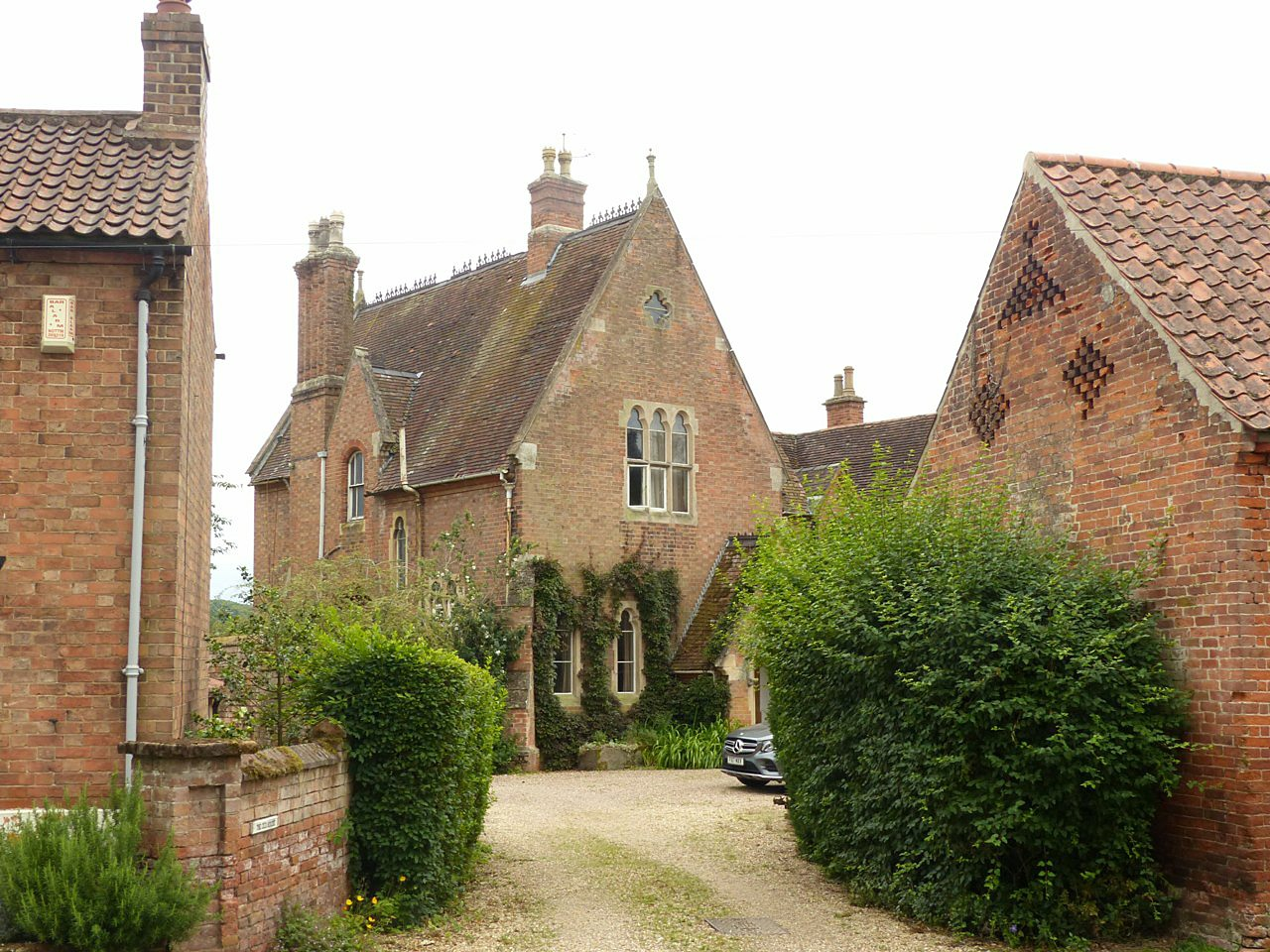
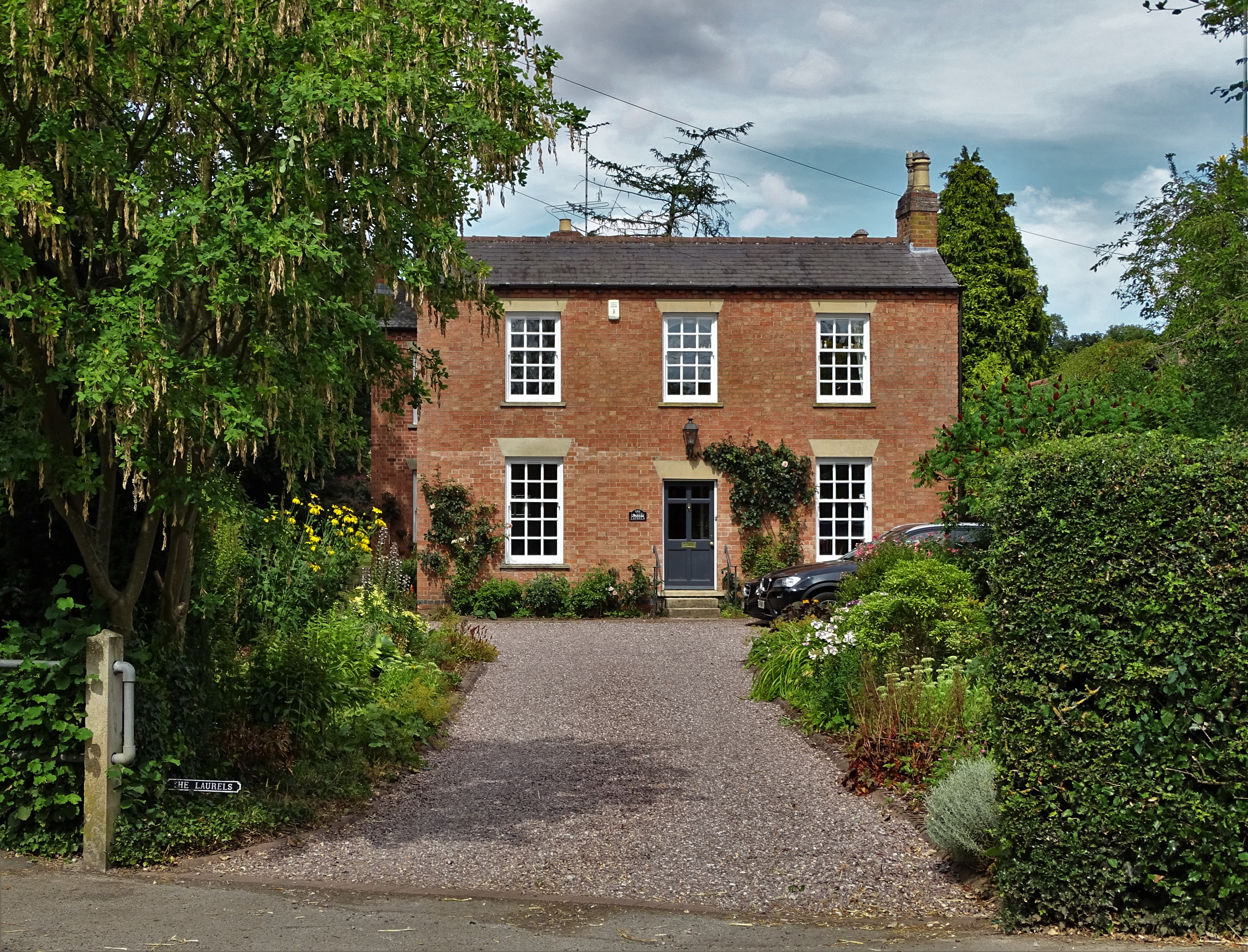
- Holy Cross Church The Old House The Laurels

- Location within Nottinghamshire
- Interactive map of Epperstone
- Area: 3.79 sq mi (9.8 km^{2})
- Population: 517 (2021)
  - Density: 136/sq mi (53/km^{2})
- OS grid reference: SK 652484
  - London: 110 mi (180 km) SSE
- District: Newark and Sherwood
- Shire county: Nottinghamshire
- Region: East Midlands
- Country: England
- Sovereign state: United Kingdom
- Post town: NOTTINGHAM
- Postcode district: NG14
- Dialling code: 0115
- Police: Nottinghamshire
- Fire: Nottinghamshire
- Ambulance: East Midlands
- UK Parliament: Newark
- Website: www.epperstoneparishcouncil.uk

Epperstone is an English village and civil parish in mid-Nottinghamshire, located near Lowdham and Calverton. It had a population (including Gonalston) of 589 at the time of the 2011 census, falling to 517 at the 2021 census. Many inhabitants commute to work or school in Nottingham 9 miles (16 km) to the south-west.

== Location and governance ==
Epperstone lies in the valley of the Dover Beck 7 miles (11 km) south-west of Southwell. The Dover Beck is joined by the Order Beck in the village. The parish has an area of 2,429 acres (983 ha; 9.83 km^{2}; 3.795 sq mi), of which 250 acres (100 ha) are wooded. It is adjacent to Gonalston, Lowdham, Woodborough, Calverton and Oxton.

Epperstone lies in the Newark and Sherwood district of Nottinghamshire. The district council has had a Conservative majority since 2007. It belongs to Newark constituency, whose member since 2014 has been Robert Jenrick (Conservative). The village has a parish council. It was in Thurgarton Wapentake (i. e. Hundred) up to 1894.

== Toponymy ==
Epperstone seems to contain the Old English personal name, Eorphere + tun (Old English), an enclosure; a farmstead; a village; an estate.., so "Eorphere's farm/settlement".

== History ==
In the 1086 Domesday Survey Epperstone was recorded as having had a church and a priest. Evidence has been found of a church even in the Anglo-Saxon period. The only relics left of any date earlier than that of the existing church are pieces of the font, a finial in the churchyard, and the lower part of the wall of the nave.

The common was enclosed in 1768, when 254 acres (103 ha) were allotted in lieu of tithes.

Litchfield library, founded in 1839 by John Litchfield Esq., contained 2,250 volumes on philosophical and miscellaneous subjects, available to all subscribers of sixpence per quarter, paid in advance. The books were kept in the schoolroom until 1843, when the donor erected a building and vested it, together with the library, in trustees for the use of the Epperstone's parishioners.

It is thought that the undulating field behind Church Cottages, off Church Lane, inspired the Barrow-Downs in J. R. R. Tolkien's The Fellowship of the Ring.

According to surveys, the population of Epperstone fluctuated after 1801, when the first accessible records were made. In that year it was 422. In 1851, this rose to 511, but in 1901, fell to 262. In 1853, Thomas Holdsworth was the principal landowner and Lord of the manor. Thomas Moore, John Towle, John Litchfield, John Thomas, William Barnard, and Henry Sherbrooke also held estates.

== Notable people ==
In birth order

- John Mastin, cleric and memoirist from a labouring background, was born in Epperstone on 30 September 1747.
- William Darwin Fox, naturalist, cleric and man of letters, was curate of Epperstone Church in 1829–38.
- Evelyn Abbott, classical scholar, was born in Epperstone on 10 March 1843.
- Sir Francis Ley, industrialist, sports enthusiast and High Sheriff of Nottingham, bought Epperstone Manor in 1897. It was sold by his son Henry in 1917.
- Tom Gamble, racing driver, was born in Epperstone on 7 November 2001.

== Education ==
A licence to teach in Epperstone was granted in 1625 to a Mr Moore. The schoolhouse in Toad Lane was built about 1756 with a house for the master next door. The free school was purchased in 1838 with money raised by subscription, and a grant from the National Society. About 100 children were soon attending the school. It moved to a larger building in the Oxton road, dating from 1855, when the earlier schoolhouse was sold. This Church of England primary school continued until 1985, when about a dozen remaining pupils were transferred to Lowdham School.

== Places of worship ==
The Anglican parish church of Epperstone is dedicated to the Holy Cross. The present joint parish with Gonalston, Woodborough and Oxton is part of the Diocese of Southwell and Nottingham.

The Wesleyan Methodist chapel built about 1800 closed for worship in 1973. The Primitive Methodist Chapel functioned from 1851 to about 1904. Both are now private houses.

== Facilities ==
The Cross Keys is a free house in Epperstone that serves meals and drinks. It reopened in mid-2015 after a nine-month refurbishment. The Cross Keys are a heraldic symbol of Heaven and St Peter. These days there is no longer a shop in the village. The nearest are in Lowdham. The Bumbles tearoom and garden also serves foods to eat in or take away.

At Epperstone's tennis courts there are two artificial-surface doubles tennis courts. The adjacent village hall provides a children's play area, and there is a full-sized cricket pitch. Epperstone Cricket Club plays in the South Notts Cricket League.

Adjacent is Bourne Wood, which began as a grove planted by children for the Millennium. The village has a Women's Institute and a Crafts Club, and Wednesday coffee mornings are held at the church.

Epperstone Festival, a biennial event, was held again on 14 June 2015. Sixteen private gardens could be visited. The proceeds of about £8500 were divided among Lincolnshire and Nottinghamshire Air Ambulance, St Ann's Food Bank and Epperstone Church.

== Conservation ==
Epperstone was designated a conservation area in 1972. A Conservation Area Appraisal was completed in February 2006. Apart from the Grade I listed church, the village has 16 Grade II listed buildings. Most are now residential, but they include barns and three dovecotes.

The report notes Epperstone's "very distinctive character... a combination of topography, buildings, trees and walls.... The constantly changing views make it an attractive space to move through." It also notes, "The approach to the village from the west is along a tunnel formed by overhanging trees, including ash, holly, maple, horse chestnut and yew. This creates a strong sense of arrival as you enter the village." The report criticises additions made to the former police training centre in Main Street.

== Transport ==
Trentbarton operate the Calverton route to Epperstone, providing a single service in the morning and evening on Monday to Saturday as an extension to the normal route from Nottingham to Calverton.

Epperstone bypass was completed in 1932. It came as an improvement to the A6097 (previously B688) road between the A46 near Saxondale and the A614 at Farnsfield, crossing the River Trent at Gunthorpe. This began to be developed in the 1920s as a north-east/south-west route to avoid Nottingham. Epperstone is also linked by minor roads to Calverton, Woodborough, Lowdham Grange and Gonalston.

== See also ==
- Listed buildings in Epperstone
