= Drissell =

Drissell is a surname. Notable people with the surname include:

- George Drissell (born 1999), English cricketer
- Peter Drissell (born 1955), British Royal Air Force officer

== See also ==
- Driesell
- Driskell
