= Richard Roe =

Richard Roe may refer to:

- Richard Roe (cricketer)
- Richard Roe (clockmaker)
- Richard Roe (pseudonym)
