= Chris Mullin (disambiguation) =

Chris Mullin (born 1963) is an American former professional basketball player.

Chris Mullin may also refer to:

- Chris Mullin (politician) (born 1947), English politician, novelist and diarist

== See also ==
- Christopher Mullane, New Zealand Army lieutenant colonel, ONZM MBE, 1979 US Legion of Merit
- Chris Mullen, Royal Air Force officer
- Christopher Mullins (born 1986), Australian Paralympic cerebral palsy track and field athlete
