= Chacksfield =

Chacksfield is a surname. Notable people are:

- Bernard Chacksfield (1913–1999), English Royal Navy officer
- Frank Chacksfield (1914–1995), English musician
