= Timothy Woods =

Timothy or Tim Woods may refer to:

- Timothy Woods (schoolmaster)
- Timothy Woods (Royal Navy officer)
- Tim Woods (racing driver)
- Tim Woods, alternate ring name for American professional wrestler Mr. Wrestling
