= No. 37 Squadron RAF Regiment =

Disbanded Royal Air Force Regiment Squadron

- Active: 1951–2006
- Disbanded: 2006
- Country: United Kingdom
- Branch: Royal Air Force
- Role: Ground Based Air Defence (GBAD)
- Size: 100 personnel (1998)
- Motto: Versatilis (Latin: Versatile)

No. 37 Squadron RAF Regiment was a Ground Based Aircraft Defence (GBAD) squadron of the Royal Air Force Regiment. The squadron operated mostly outside the United Kingdom since its formation in 1951 until 2006 when it was disbanded. It started out as a field squadron before becoming involved in the GBAD programme, where it operated the Rapier missile system.

== History ==
No. 37 Squadron RAF Regiment was formed at RAF Yatesbury in 1951. In the early 1960s, No. 37 Squadron was deployed to RAF Khormaksar to help in combatting the terrorist forces at work in Aden at that time. Whilst deployed in the Middle-East in 1963, three former British colonies in East Africa were the subject of mutinies by their respective armed forces. 37 squadron was deployed to Tanzania to secure an airhead there, whilst the Royal Marines were sent to quell the mutinies.

In 1976, the squadron deployed with Rapiers to RAF Bruggen in Germany alongside 16, 26 and 63 Squadrons (at Wildenrath, Laarbruch and Gütersloh respectively). With the end of the Cold War, the decision was taken to withdraw most of the RAF Units and Squadrons from Germany with 37 Squadron being one of the last to transfer to from Bruggen to RAF Wittering in October 2001.

In 1998, the squadron numbered around 100 personnel. In July 2005, it was announced in Parliament that No. 37 Squadron would be disbanded along with three other RAF Regiment GBAD squadrons (15, 16 and 26) in favour of the GBAD responsibility being handed over to the Royal Regiment of Artillery. Of the four squadrons, No. 37 was the first to be disbanded in March 2006, with its final home being RAF Wittering in Cambridgeshire.

No. 37 Squadron's Standard was awarded to them by Air Marshal Peter Terry in 1980 and is laid up in St Edmundsbury Cathedral - the national church of the RAF Regiment - in Bury St Edmunds, Suffolk.

== Locations ==
- Abu Sueir
- Nicosia
- Akrotiri
- Upwood
- Khormaksar
- Aldergrove/Ballykelly/Bishops Court in roulement with other RAF Regiment squadrons and Royal Marine Commandoes
- Catterick
- Bruggen
- Wittering

== Notable personnel ==
- Air Vice-Marshal David Hawkins, officer commanding 1971 to 1974
