= Listed buildings in Woodborough, Nottinghamshire =

Woodborough is a civil parish in the Gedling district of Nottinghamshire, England. The parish contains 16 listed buildings that are recorded in the National Heritage List for England. Of these, two are listed at Grade II*, the middle of the three grades, and the others are at Grade II, the lowest grade. The parish contains the village of Woodborough and the surrounding area. All the listed buildings are in the village, and consist of a church, houses, cottages and associated structures, including two water pumps, and a telephone kiosk.

== Key ==
Grade	Criteria
II*	Particularly important buildings of more than special interest
II	Buildings of national importance and special interest

== Buildings ==
Name and location	Photograph	Date	Notes	Grade
St Swithun's Church; 53.02302°N 1.05991°W		12th century	The church has been altered and extended through the centuries, including a restoration in 1891–93. It is built in stone, and consists of a nave with a clerestory, north and south aisles, a south porch, a chancel, and a west tower. The tower has two stages, diagonal buttresses, a coved string course, an eaves band, and an embattled parapet with four crocketed pinnacles. On the west side is a doorway with a chamfered surround and a four-centred arch, above which is a triple lancet window, on the north side is a clock face, and the bell openings have two lights.	II*
Woodborough Hall; 53.02353°N 1.06951°W	—	c. 1660	The house, which was remodelled and enlarged in 1850, is in rendered brick on a rendered plinth, with stone dressings and a hipped slate roof. There are three storeys and a square plan with fronts of four bays. In the centre of the south front is a round-headed doorway with a chamfered surround, and the windows are mullioned and transomed casements with Gothic glazing. To the right is a single-storey five-bay service wing.	II*
Hall Farmhouse; 53.02437°N 1.06795°W		1710	A farmhouse, later a private house, in brick, with floor bands, and a tile roof with shouldered coped gables. There are three storeys and two gabled bays, a lean-to on the west side, and a later rear extension. In the centre is a gabled porch with a round-arched opening and a doorway with a fanlight, above which is an inscribed datestone. Most of the windows are mullioned casements. To the right is a gabled cartshed with a single bay, and doors with segmental heads.	II
Elm Cottage; 53.02469°N 1.06939°W	—	Early 18th century	A pair of cottages combined into a house, in brick, with dentilled eaves and a tile roof. There are two storeys and five bays, a lower two-storey extension to the left, and a single-storey lean-to on the right. On the front are two porches with hoods on wooden brackets, and most of the windows are sashes, those in the ground floor with segmental heads.	II
Chimneys; 53.02451°N 1.06919°W	—	Late 18th century	A house that was later extended, in brick on a stone plinth, with roofs of tile and pantile. There are two storeys and an L-shaped plan, with a front range of three bays, a lower two-storey single-bay service wing to the left, a rear wing, and a later single-storey extension with three bays. The windows are a mix of casements and horizontally-sliding sashes, those in the ground floor with segmental heads. At the rear is a lean-to porch, and the rear wing contains bow windows.	II
117 Main Street and workshop 53.02347°N 1.05865°W		Late 18th century	A pair of cottages and a former framework knitters' workshop combined into one house, it is in brick with cogged eaves and has a pantile roof. There are two storeys and seven bays. The windows are a mix of casements, and horizontally-sliding sashes, and there are two large knitters' windows. Most of the ground floor openings have segmental heads.	II
Pigeoncote and stables, 121 Main Street; 53.02362°N 1.05784°W		Late 18th century	The pigeoncote and stables are in brick on a stone plinth, with dentilled eaves, and a pantile roof with coped gables. The building is in one and two storeys, and there are four bays. Most openings have segmental heads, the windows are casements, and there are rows of cogged alighting ledges on two fronts.	II
Manor Farm Buildings; 53.02321°N 1.06188°W		Late 18th century	The buildings consist of barns and racehorse stables, which have been extended over the years, particularly in 1878. The buildings are in brick on a chamfered plinth, with dressings in stone and brick, a floor band, half-round eaves, and roofs in tile and pantile with coped gables, kneelers and finials. They are in one and two storeys, they form two quadrangles divided by a barn, and have sides of 17 and seven bays. In the centre is a gabled gatehouse containing a round-headed archway with pilasters and a keystone. Above it is a round-headed recess containing a casement window, and in the gable is a datestone. The flanking bays contain casement windows. The barn has a stone plinth, cogged eaves, doorways, vents and a carriage arch.	II
Water pump and trough, 121 Main Street; 53.02357°N 1.05783°W	—	1817	The water pump is in lead, it is in a rectangular wood case, and has a hipped cap and a straight iron handle. On the cistern are cast figures, the date and initials. The stone trough has a half-round end.	II
150 Main Street; 53.02318°N 1.05352°W	—	Early 19th century	A house in red brick with dentilled eaves and a pantile roof. There are two storeys and four bays, and a later rear extension. On the front is a gabled porch, the windows are casements, and all the ground floor openings have segmental heads. At the rear is a sash window.	II
152 and 156 Main Street; 53.02305°N 1.05376°W		Early 19th century	A row of three cottages, later two cottages and a shop, at right angles to the street, in brick with dentilled eaves and a pantile roof. There are two storeys and eight irregular bays, and lean-to additions at the rear. All the windows are casements, and the ground floor openings have segmental heads.	II
16A The Bank; 53.02211°N 1.07122°W	—	Early 19th century	A framework knitters' workshop, later used for other purposes, in brick, with rebated eaves, an eaves band, and a tile roof. There are two storeys and two bays. The windows are multi-light casements, those in the ground floor with segmental heads, and there is a garage door with a segmental head.	II
Pinfold; 53.02321°N 1.05844°W	—	Early 19th century	The pinfold is in brick, with blue brick coping and the remains of chamfered stone coping. It is partly rendered, and measures about 3 metres (9.8 ft) square.	II
Coach house, wall and greenhouse, Woodborough Hall; 53.02383°N 1.06960°W	—	Mid 19th century	The coach house, later converted into flats, is in brick on a chamfered plinth, with roofs of tile and slate. It is in one and two storeys with an L-shaped plan, and has a main range of five bays, and a gabled wing. It contains two doorways with elliptical heads and keystones, and the windows are casements with segmental heads. The adjoining greenhouse also contains casement windows. The attached garden wall is in rendered brick with flat stone coping, it has an L-shaped plan, and contains two doorways and a four-bay potting shed.	II
Water pump, Manor Farm Buildings; 53.02328°N 1.06172°W	—	c. 1878	The water pump is in cast iron. It has a round stem, a fluted barrel, a domed cap, and a cranked handle on a bracket.	II
Telephone kiosk 53.02443°N 1.06912°W		1935	The K6 type telephone kiosk in Main Street was designed by Giles Gilbert Scott. Constructed in cast iron with a square plan and a dome, it has three unperforated crowns in the top panels.	II
