= Listed buildings in Oxton, Nottinghamshire =

Oxton is a civil parish in the Newark and Sherwood district of Nottinghamshire, England. The parish contains 13 listed buildings that are recorded in the National Heritage List for England. Of these, one is listed at Grade I, the highest of the three grades, and the others are at Grade II, the lowest grade. The parish includes the village of Oxton and the surrounding area. All the listed buildings are in the village, and consist of houses, cottages, and farmhouses, two buildings associated with demolished Oxton Hall, a church and its gateway, a tomb chest, a former forge and an adjacent petrol pump.

== Key ==
Grade	Criteria
I	Buildings of exceptional interest, sometimes considered to be internationally important
II	Buildings of national importance and special interest

== Buildings ==
Name and location	Photograph	Date	Notes	Grade
St Peter and St Paul's Church; 53.05617°N 1.06133°W		12th century	The church has been altered and enlarged through the centuries, including a restoration in 1840–41. It is built in stone with slate roofs, and consists of a nave with a clerestory, north and south aisles, a north porch, a chancel, a north vestry and a west tower. The tower has two stages, diagonal buttresses, a plinth, bands, an arched west window with a hood mould, clock faces, two-light bell openings, and an embattled parapet with the bases of corner pinnacles.	I
Church Farmhouse; 53.05545°N 1.06171°W		Late 17th century	The farmhouse is in brick with some stone, and has a tile roof with stone coped gables and kneelers. There are two storeys and attic, a double depth plan, and two bays. The doorway has a fanlight, and most of the windows are casements, all have stone hood moulds, and some have mullions.	II
Tomb chest 53.05847°N 1.06077°W	—	c. 1710	The tomb chest is in stone, it has a shaped top, and at each angle is an engaged large vase moulding. The tomb is enclosed by spiked cast iron railings on a stone plinth. At the corners and in the centre of the long sides, the railing has a small urn with an orb finial.	II
Home Farmhouse; 53.05867°N 1.06258°W		Early 18th century	The farmhouse is in red brick, with a floor band, dentilled eaves, and a tile roof with brick coped gables and kneelers. There are two storeys and attics, four bays, and a single-storey rear extension. The doorway has a segmental arch, and the windows are casements, some tripartite, and some with segmental arches.	II
Wesley House; 53.05938°N 1.06252°W		Early 18th century	The house is in brick with dentilled eaves, and a tile roof with a raised gable and kneelers facing the street. There are three storeys and four bays. The central doorway has a stone hood on stone brackets, and to the right is a doorway with projecting jambs and a stone hood. To the left are two canted bay windows with flat roofs, the other windows in the lower two floors are sashes, and in the top floor they are casements.	II
Garden House; 53.05648°N 1.06135°W		Mid 18th century	The house is in red brick, with dogtooth eaves, and a pantile roof with coped gables. There are two storeys and attics, four bays, and a single-storey single-bay lean-to on the right. The doorway has a fanlight, the windows are sashes, and all the openings have painted wedge lintels and keystones. In the attic is a flat-topped dormer with a casement window.	II
Orchard Farmhouse; 53.05250°N 1.06412°W	—	Mid 18th century	The farmhouse is in brick with dentilled eaves and a slate roof. There are two storeys and attics, and four bays. On the front is an open porch and a doorway with a fanlight, and the windows are sashes with painted flush lintels. In the attic are two flat-topped dormers with casement windows and lead roofs.	II
1, 2 and 3 The Cottages; 53.05872°N 1.06097°W		Late 18th century	A row of three brick cottages with dentilled eaves and a pantile roof. There are two storeys, eight bays, and a single-storey two-bay extension on the right. On the front are three gabled porches, and windows, most of which are casements.	II
The Old Forge; 53.05895°N 1.06256°W		c. 1800	The former forge is in red brick with a pantile roof and a single storey. The openings include doorways, a window and a cart entrance.	II
Coach house, former Oxton Hall; 53.05805°N 1.06108°W		Early 19th century	The coach house, which has been converted for residential use, is in rendered red brick with some stone, and has bracketed eaves and a hipped slate roof. There are two storeys and an L-shaped plan, with a front range of five bays, the right two bays projecting slightly, and a projecting two-storey three-bay wing on the right. The building contains an archway with inner doorways, a carriage archway, sash windows, oval openings and arched doorways. On the roof is a lantern with clock faces, wooden arcading, and a shallow pyramidal roof.	II
Laundry, former Oxton Hall; 53.05775°N 1.06078°W	—	Early 19th century	The laundry, which has been converted for residential use, is in rendered red brick, and has a floor band, dentilled eaves and a pyramidal tile roof. There are two storeys and a single bay. It contains a Venetian window in each floor, and attached to the right is a rendered wall and the remains of a rusticated stone pier.	II
Gateway, St Peter and St Paul's Church; 53.05630°N 1.06146°W		Late 19th century	At the entrance to the churchyard is a stepped wall with shaped coping containing a segmental arched gateway with double wooden gates. This is flanked by stone walls 1.5 metres (4 ft 11 in) high with shaped coping, curving outwards and ending in piers with shaped coping.	II
Petrol pump 53.05900°N 1.06245°W		c. 1935	The petrol pump to the east of The Old Forge is square and in steel. It stands on a chamfered and stepped concrete base, and has a hexagonal fuel dial with small canopy. The top is chamfered, the globe is missing, and on the left side is the petrol pump hose and nozzle.	II
