= St Peter & St Paul's Church, Oxton =

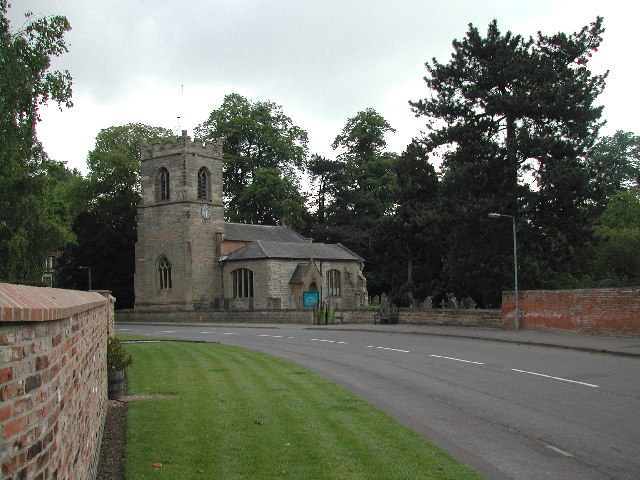
- St Peter & St Paul's Church, Oxton
- St Peter & St Paul's Church, Oxton
- 53°3′22.10″N 1°3′36.1″W
- OS grid reference: SK 63012 51398
- Location: Oxton, Nottinghamshire
- Country: England
- Denomination: Church of England

History
- Dedication: St Peter and St Paul

Architecture
- Heritage designation: Grade I listed

Administration
- Diocese: Diocese of Southwell and Nottingham
- Archdeaconry: Nottingham
- Deanery: Gedling
- Parish: Oxton

St Peter & St Paul's Church, Oxton is a Grade I listed parish church in the Church of England in Oxton, Nottinghamshire.

== History ==
The church dates from the 12th century.

The church is in a joint parish with:

- Holy Cross Church, Epperstone
- St Swithun's Church, Woodborough
- St Laurence's Church, Gonalston

== Memorials ==
Memorials include:

- William Savile, 1681. Brass plaque, nave floor

== Organ ==
A specification of the organ can be found on the National Pipe Organ Register.

== See also ==
- Grade I listed buildings in Nottinghamshire
- Listed buildings in Oxton, Nottinghamshire
