= David Hawkins (RAF officer) =

Royal Air Force officer (1937–2019)

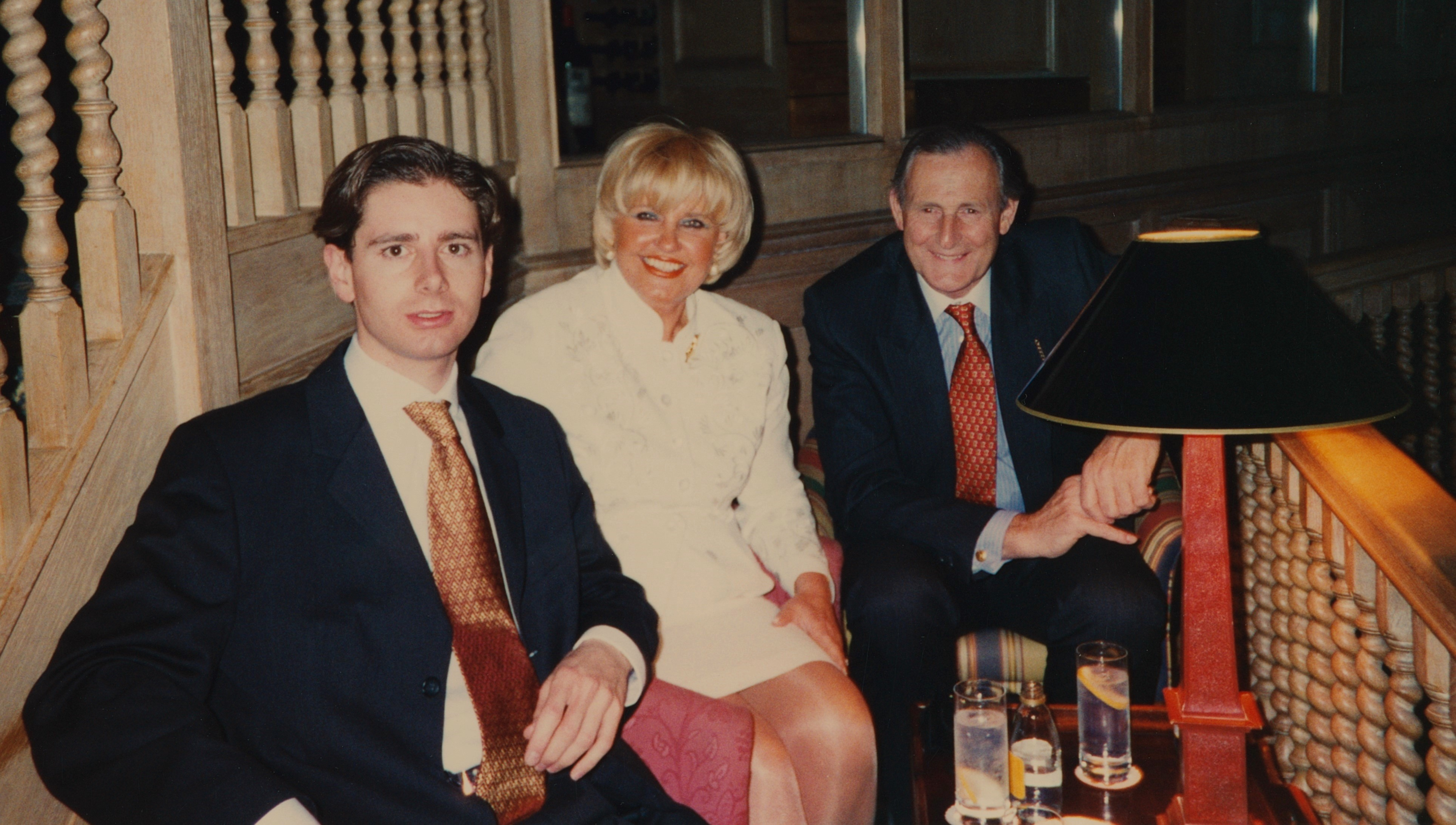
- David Hawkins-Leth (right) and his wife Karen, called Dede, together with Dieter A. Borer, a Swiss diplomat, at the Mosimann's Club in London in 1997. Photo taken by Anton Mosimann
- Born: 5 April 1937; Streatham, South London, England
- Died: 31 January 2019 (aged 81); London, England
- Other name: David Hawkins-Leth
- Military career
- Allegiance: United Kingdom
- Branch: Royal Air Force
- Service years: 1955–1993
- Rank: Air vice-marshal
- Service number: 2767499
- Commands: No. 37 Squadron RAF Regiment (1971–74); RAF Regiment (1991–93)

Air-Vice Marshal David Richard Hawkins CB, LVO, MBE, DL (5 April 1937 – 31 January 2019), also known as David Hawkins-Leth, was a senior Royal Air Force officer who commanded the Royal Air Force Regiment in the 1990s. After his RAF service, he became an usher for Black Rod and a Deputy Lord Lieutenant for Greater London.

== Early life ==
Hawkins was born in Streatham, South London in April 1937 and educated at Worth School and Downside.

== RAF career ==
Hawkins joined the RAF in 1955 as a gunner in the RAF Regiment, but was awarded a short commission in 1956, with the commissioning becoming permanent in 1959. His infantry training was at the Royal Military Academy Sandhurst, with Hawkins being the last RAF officer to undergo the training there before the RAF took on training its own Regiment officers. In 1971, he was appointed as the officer commanding No. 37 Squadron RAF Regiment, then based at RAF Catterick in North Yorkshire with frequent deployments to Northern Ireland. In 1974, he was the officer commanding the Queen's Colour Squadron (QCS). Whilst in command at QCS, he and his men appeared on the Generation Game with Bruce Forsyth, where they performed their drill manoeuvres for the contestants to emulate. In 1977, he was appointed a Member of the British Empire.

After being promoted to wing commander and then group captain, Hawkins undertook a number of staff posts at AAFCE and HQ Strike Command in High Wycombe, with other postings to RAF Catterick and one as the Director of Personal Services within the RAF HQ. By 1991 and in the rank of air vice-marshal, he took on the role of the Commandant-General of the RAF Regiment. In 1992, he was made a Companion of the Order of the Bath.

In 1993, Hawkins relinquished his appointment as Commandant General of the RAF Regiment, and retired from active service, being succeeded by T G Thorn.

== Later career ==
Following retirement from the RAF, he was appointed Director of Military and Government Affairs for WDSL Aerospace Ltd, and he took on a similar post with Coltraco Ultrasonics Ltd in 2014, as well as being a member of Safe Waste and Power consultants. Hawkins was also a Gentleman Usher to the Queen (invested in 1994), a Yeoman Usher of the Black Rod between 1993 and 1998, and a Deputy Lord Lieutenant of Greater London between 1994 and 2012. In 1995, as Yeoman Usher of the Black Rod, Hawkins sent a letter to Sir Geoffrey Howe instructing him to cease ongoing proceedings in the House of Lords that were being filmed in relation to a debate on the single European currency. The conference was in some unspecified way breaking the rules of the house and attending film crews were warned that they would have their media passes revoked if they broadcast the footage of the event.

He was made a Lieutenant in the Royal Victorian Order in 2007.

== Personal life ==
Hawkins was married three times; first to Wendy Harris (1965–1981), secondly to Elaine Nelson (1982–1997), and thirdly, in 1998, to Karen Hansen-d’Leth, a dentist who had a surgery in Harley Street. He adopted his wife's name as part of his surname to become Hawkins-Leth. When his wife retired, they moved to Denmark, but in ill-health, he returned to London in the last days of his life. He died on 31 January 2019.

== Honours ==
=== National Honours ===
- United Kingdom: Companion of the Order of the Bath
- United Kingdom: Lieutenant of the Royal Victorian Order
- United Kingdom: Member of the Order of the British Empire

=== Foreign Honours ===
- (Kingdom of the Two Sicilies) Two Sicilian Royal Family: Knight Commander of the Royal Order of Francis I

Military offices
Preceded by G C Williams	Commandant-General of the RAF Regiment; 1991–1993	Succeeded by T G Thorn
