= Nick Bray =

RAF officer

Nick Bray CBE
- Military career
- Allegiance: United Kingdom
- Branch: Royal Air Force
- Service years: 1983 –
- Rank: Air Commodore
- Commands: RAF Regiment (2012–13); RAF Honington (2009–11)
- Conflicts: War in Afghanistan
- Awards: Commander of the Order of the British Empire; Queen's Commendation for Valuable Service

Air Commodore Nicholas Bray, CBE is a Royal Air Force officer. He served as Commandant-General of the RAF Regiment from 2012 to 2013.

== Military career ==
On 29 July 1983, the then Aircraftman Bray was commissioned into the Security Branch of the Royal Air Force as an acting pilot officer. He was given the service number 8024046L. He was regraded to pilot officer on 29 January 1984. He was promoted to flying officer on 29 January 1986, and to flight lieutenant on 29 January 1990. He served in the former Republic of Yugoslavia from April to November 1993, for which he was awarded a Queen's Commendation for Valuable Service 'in recognition of [his] services". As part of the half-yearly promotions, he was promoted to squadron leader on 1 January 1996, and to wing commander on 1 January 2001.

On 1 July 2007, he was promoted to group captain. He was appointed station commander of RAF Honington in February 2009. In 2011, as part of the NATO Training Mission-Afghanistan, he served as an adviser in the Ministry of the Interior. He also acted as the lead planner of the Afghan National Police. Appointed a Commander of the Order of the British Empire in the 2012 New Year Honours, Bray was made Commandant-General of the RAF Regiment in January the same year. In May 2013, he relinquished the appointment.

On 16 October 2017, he was granted a commission in the Royal Auxiliary Air Force in the rank of air commodore.

Military offices
Preceded by Russell La Forte	Commandant-General of the RAF Regiment; 2012–2013	Succeeded by Andrew Hall
