= Roy Faville =

British Royal Air Force officer (1908–1980)

- Born: 5 August 1908
- Died: 18 June 1980 (aged 71)
- Military career
- Allegiance: United Kingdom
- Branch: Royal Air Force
- Service years: 1931–60
- Rank: Air Vice Marshal
- Commands: No. 22 Group (1957–60); RAF Staff College, Bracknell (1956–57); RAF St Eval (1954–55); RAF Gütersloh (1946–47); No. 140 Wing (1946–47); No. 42 Squadron (1940–41)
- Conflicts: Second World War
- Awards: Commander of the Order of the British Empire

Air Vice Marshal Roy Faville, CBE (5 August 1908 – 18 June 1980) was a Royal Air Force (RAF) officer who served as Commandant of the RAF Staff College, Bracknell from 1956 to 1957.

== RAF career ==
Faville was commissioned into the Royal Air Force on 10 October 1931. After training as an engineering officer on torpedoes, he served in the Second World War as officer commanding, No. 42 Squadron before transferring to the air staff at Headquarters RAF Coastal Command. After the war he became Officer Commanding No. 140 Wing and Station Commander at RAF Gütersloh in 1946, a member of the air staff on the British Joint Service Mission at Washington, D.C. in 1950 and Station Commander, RAF St Eval in 1954.

He went on to be Commandant of the RAF Staff College, Bracknell in 1956 and Air Officer Commanding, No. 22 Group in 1957 before retiring in 1960.

Military offices
Preceded by James Fuller-Good	Air Officer Commanding No. 22 Group; 1957–1960	Succeeded by Bernard Chacksfield
Preceded by Denis Barnett	Commandant of the RAF Staff College, Bracknell; 1956–1957	Succeeded by Charles Elworthy
