= St Swithun's Church, Woodborough =

Church in Nottinghamshire, England

Coordinates: 53°01′22″N 01°03′35″W

St. Swithun's Church, Woodborough
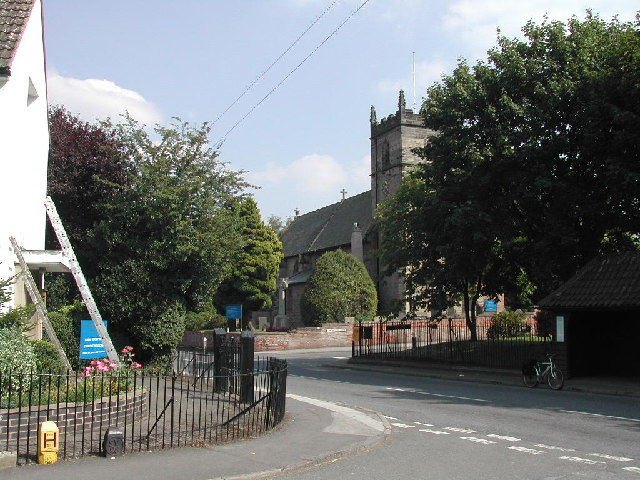
- St. Swithun's Church, Woodborough
- Denomination: Church of England
- Churchmanship: Broad Church

History
- Dedication: St. Swithun

Administration
- Province: York
- Diocese: Southwell and Nottingham
- Parish: Woodborough, Nottinghamshire

St Swithun's Church is a parish church in the Church of England in Woodborough, Nottinghamshire.

== History ==
The church is medieval with the chancel dating from the fourteenth century.

The church is a large structure ... and has some fragments of ancient armorial glass in its windows which, when perfect, was exceedingly beautiful. It is a curacy, and has been augmented with Queen Anne's Bounty. The Chapter of Southwell is the patron, and the Rev. Samuel Lealand Oldacres is the incumbent.

The church is in a joint parish with:

- St Laurence's Church, Gonalston
- Holy Cross Church, Epperstone
- St Peter & St Paul's Church, Oxton

== Features ==
The church contains stained glass windows by Charles Eamer Kempe and also by Morris & Co. to designs by Edward Burne-Jones.

== Clock ==
The clock was installed by Reuben Bosworth in 1854.

== See also ==
- Grade II* listed buildings in Nottinghamshire
- Listed buildings in Woodborough, Nottinghamshire
