= Woodborough, Nottinghamshire =

Village and civil parish in Nottinghamshire, England

Coordinates: 53.02°N 1.06°W

Woodborough
- Village and civil parish
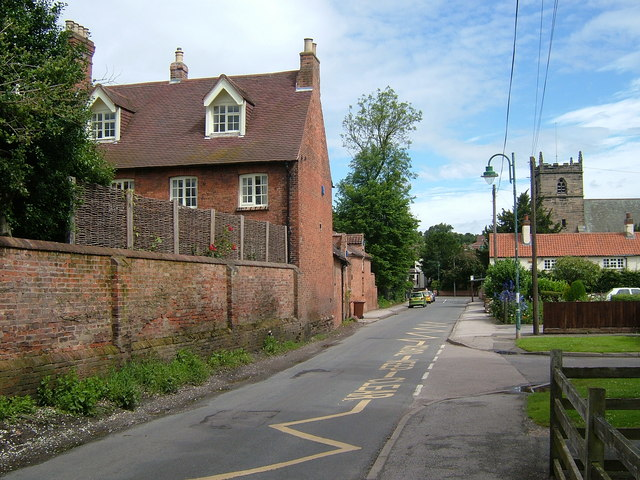
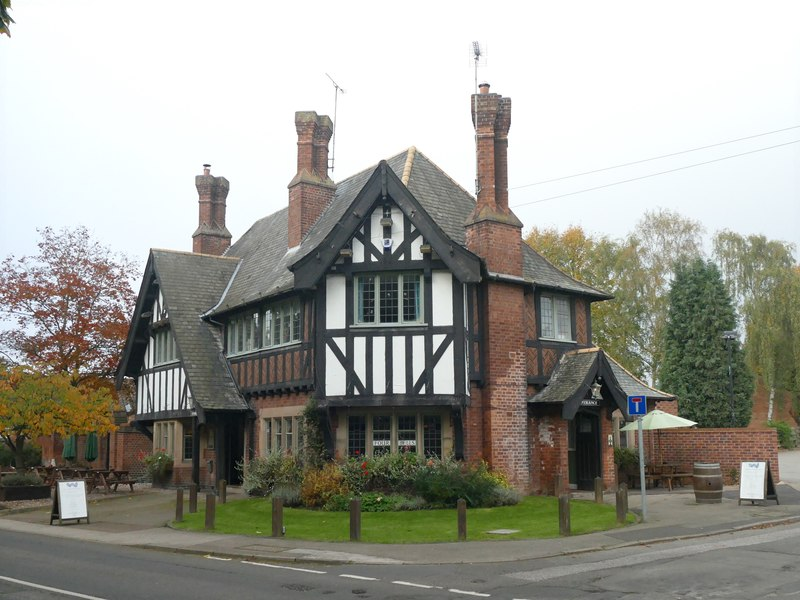
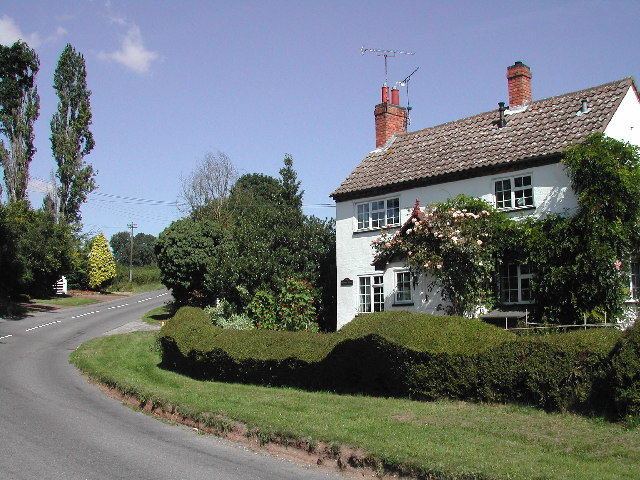
- Old Vicarage Four Bells Inn Foxwood House

- Location within Nottinghamshire
- Interactive map of Woodborough
- Area: 3.03 sq mi (7.8 km^{2})
- Population: 1,908 (2021)
  - Density: 630/sq mi (240/km^{2})
- OS grid reference: SK 631477
  - London: 110 mi (180 km) SSE
- District: Borough of Gedling
- Shire county: Nottinghamshire
- Region: East Midlands
- Country: England
- Sovereign state: United Kingdom
- Post town: NOTTINGHAM
- Postcode district: NG14
- Dialling code: 0115
- Police: Nottinghamshire
- Fire: Nottinghamshire
- Ambulance: East Midlands
- UK Parliament: Sherwood Forest
- Website: www.woodboroughpc.org.uk

Woodborough is a village and civil parish in the Borough of Gedling, Nottinghamshire, England. It lies approximately 7 miles (11 km) north-east of Nottingham and had a parish population of 1,908 at the 2021 census. The village is home to a Grade II* listed 14th-century parish church and 16th-century manor house, in addition to numerous Grade II listed buildings, including a number of 18th-century framework knitters’ workshops and a former racehorse stable. To the north of the parish is the site of Fox Wood earthworks, an early Iron Age hillfort designated as a scheduled monument. Woodborough is the reputed birthplace of William Lee, the inventor of the stocking frame knitting machine.

== Toponymy ==
The place-name Woodborough is derived from the Old English words widu (wood; or wood, timber) and burh (fortified place). It is first attested in the Domesday Book of 1086 in the form Udeburg. Following the disestablishment of the Anglo-Saxon thanage system and redistribution of land tenure to Norman elites, the local lords of the manor adopted a hereditary nom de terre, using the form Wudeburc in the Pipe Rolls of 1194 and Wodeburgh in the Feet of Fines for Essex in 1324. This latter spelling also appears in the Episcopal Registers of 1396. Memorial inscriptions in the parish church evidence the form Wodeburg until the late 15th-century, evolving to Woodburgh sometime in the first half of the 16th-century. The modern spelling became a fixed convention sometime in the 18th century.

== History ==
Sixteen men from the village lost their lives in the First World War. Eight men from the village were killed during the Second World War.

At 8.45am on 26 May 1966 there was a mid-air collision over the village between the BAC Jet Provost aircraft XP631 and XM384. Both aircraft flew from RAF Syerston.

Three ejected, two instructors and one trainee. One was Flight Lieutenant Don Henderson, who was the leader of the Viper Red aerobatics team, at Syerston. The other instructor was Flying Officer Tim Thorn of Ipswich. Air Commodore Tim Thorn would later be a SEPECAT Jaguar pilot, later Station Commander from 1987 of RAF Cranwell, and from 1993 to 1995 he was the Commandant-General of the RAF Regiment; he had acquired a series of narrow escapes.

One aircraft landed at Roe Hill. The other aircraft landed in apple trees on Calverton Lane. A tail plane landed at a former Borstal (HM Prison Lowdham Grange since 1998). A wing and fuel tank landed in the Main Street.

One person parachuted near Calverton Lane, on the property of Len Russell. One person parachuted in the village main street, on telephone wires near the Four Bells pub. One person landed towards Lowdham, picked up by ambulance. The pilots were taken to a hospital in Nottingham, then to RAF Nocton Hall in Lincolnshire.

The last mid-air collision in the area was on the evening of Monday 26 September 1949, when two RAF Lincoln bomber aircraft RE374 and RF407 collided at Averham, when all 14 were killed; both aircraft were from RAF Waddington.

== Notable people ==
- William Lee (1563–1614), inventor
- Mansfield Parkyns (1823–1894), traveller
- John Story (1812–1872), cricketer

== Bus services ==
Nottingham City Transport

- 61: Nottingham, Woodborough Road, Mapperley, Mapperley Plains, Lambley, Woodborough, Calverton.

== See also ==
- Listed buildings in Woodborough, Nottinghamshire
