= St Laurence's Church, Gonalston =

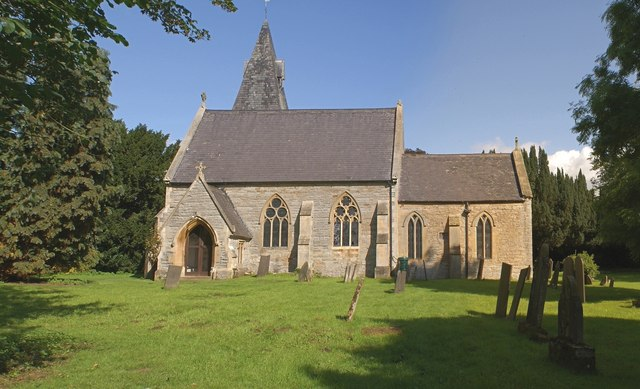
- St Laurence's Church, Gonalston
- St Laurence's Church, Gonalston
- 53°1′12.36″N 0°59′4.5″W
- OS grid reference: SK 68219 47463
- Location: Gonalston
- Country: England
- Denomination: Church of England

History
- Dedication: St Laurence

Architecture
- Heritage designation: Grade II listed

Administration
- Diocese: Diocese of Southwell and Nottingham
- Archdeaconry: Nottingham
- Deanery: Gedling
- Parish: Gonalston

St Laurence's Church, Gonalston is a Grade II listed parish church in the Church of England in Gonalston.

== History ==
The church dates from the 14th century. It was rebuilt in 1843 by Thomas Chambers Hine.

The church is in a joint parish with:

- Holy Cross Church, Epperstone
- St Swithun's Church, Woodborough
- St Peter & St Paul's Church, Oxton

== Memorials ==
Memorials include:

- 3 early C14 damaged reclining effigies of the Heriz family, 2 of cross legged Knights and the third of Lady Mathilda in wimpole with head under an ogee arch decorated with crockets and further decorated with stiff leaf and more naturalistic foliage. North aisle

== See also ==
- Listed buildings in Gonalston
