= Russell La Forte =

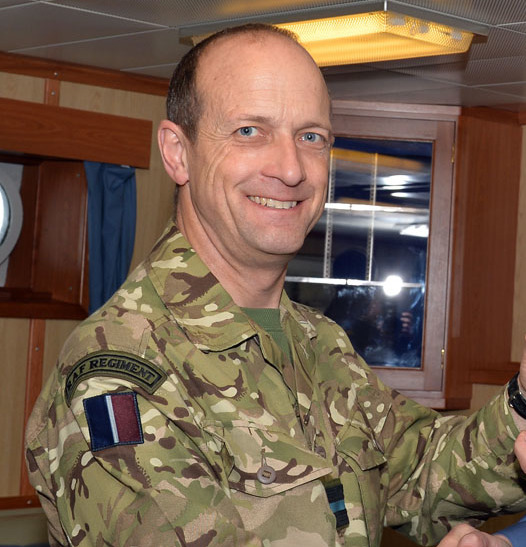
- Born: 1960 (age 65–66)
- Military career
- Allegiance: United Kingdom
- Branch: Royal Air Force (1978–2015); Royal Air Force Reserve (2015–present)
- Service years: 1978–present
- Rank: Air Commodore
- Unit: RAF Regiment
- Commands: British Forces South Atlantic Islands (2013–15); RAF Regiment (2010–12); RAF Honington (2007–08)
- Conflicts: The Troubles; Operation Southern Watch; Sierra Leone Civil War; War in Afghanistan; Iraq War
- Awards: Commander of the Order of the British Empire

Air Commodore Russell William "Russ" La Forte, CBE (born 1960) is a senior Royal Air Force officer. He served as Commandant-General of the RAF Regiment from 2010 to 2012, and commander of the British Forces South Atlantic Islands from 2013 to 2015. Since November 2015, he has been Director of RAF Sport.

== Early life and education ==
Born in 1960 to Edward La Forte, he was educated at Manor Primary School, Didcot, and Wallingford Grammar School, Wallingford, Berkshire. He was a member of the Air Training Corps as a teenager.

La Forte joined the military after leaving school, rather than attend university. In later life, he studied history through the Open University, a distance learning institution. He graduated in 1994 with a First Class Bachelor of Arts (BA) degree. He graduated from King's College London in 2001 with a Master of Arts (MA) degree in defence studies.

== Military career ==
In 1978, La Forte joined the RAF Regiment as a gunner. He served tours in West Germany and in Northern Ireland during The Troubles.

On 20 May 1982, the then senior aircraftman La Forte was commissioned into the Security Branch of the Royal Air Force as a pilot officer with seniority from 25 September 1980. He was promoted to flight lieutenant on 25 September 1986. As part of the half-yearly promotions, he was promoted to squadron leader on 1 July 1991. He deployed to Northern Iraq in 1993–94 as part of Operation Southern Watch

A wing commander from 1 January 1999, he was promoted to group captain on 1 January 2004 and was appointed aide de camp (ADC) to Queen Elizabeth II on 1 November 2007. From 2007 to 2008, he served as station commander of RAF Honington.

In 2009, La Forte attended the Higher Command and Staff Course at the Defence Academy of the United Kingdom. He then served as Commandant-General of the RAF Regiment from February 2010 to January 2012. In December 2011, he was appointed Assistant Chief of Staff Training, HQ No. 22 Group. In March 2013, he was appointed Commander British Forces South Atlantic Islands. He was succeeded in that role by Commodore Darren Bone in April 2015.

On 10 October 2015, La Forte transferred to the Royal Air Force Reserve in the rank of air commodore. In November 2015, he was appointed Director of RAF Sport and he is based at RAF Halton. He is also the president of the RAF Mountaineering Association.

== Honours ==
In the 1995 New Year Honours, La Forte was appointed a Member of the Order of the British Empire (MBE), in recognition of his service in Northern Ireland the previous year. He was appointed aide de camp (ADC) to Queen Elizabeth II on 1 November 2007. He was promoted to Commander of the Order of the British Empire (CBE) in the 2009 Queen's Birthday Honours.

Military offices
Preceded by Steven Abbott	Commandant-General of the RAF Regiment; 2010–2012	Succeeded by Nick Bray
