= Brian Courtenay Yarde =

Royal Air Force officer (1905–1986)

- Born: 5 September 1905
- Died: 29 October 1986 (aged 81)
- Military career
- Allegiance: United Kingdom
- Branch: Royal Air Force
- Service years: 1924–1957
- Rank: Air Vice Marshal
- Commands: RAF Regiment (1954–57); No. 62 Group (1953–54); Royal Air Force Police (1951–53); RAF Gatow (1947–49)
- Conflicts: Second World War
- Awards: Commander of the Royal Victorian Order; Commander of the Order of the British Empire; Mentioned in Despatches (2); Officer of the Legion of Merit (United States)

Air Vice Marshal Brian Courtenay Yarde, CVO, CBE (5 September 1905 – 29 October 1986) was a Royal Air Force officer during the Second World War and a senior commander in the 1950s.

== Early life and career ==
Born on 5 September 1905, Brian Yarde was educated at Bedford School and at the Royal Air Force College Cranwell, where he received the Sword of Honour in 1926. During the Second World War he served in France, Malaya, and in the Middle East. In 1945, he was appointed as deputy director of Bomber Operations at the Air Ministry. Between 1947 and 1949 he was Station Commander of RAF Gatow during the Berlin Airlift, and between 1951 and 1953 he was Provost Marshal and Chief of the Royal Air Force Police. Between 1953 and 1954 he was Air Officer Commanding No. 62 Group, and between 1954 and 1957 he was Commandant-General of the RAF Regiment.

Air Vice Marshal Yarde retired from the Royal Air Force in 1957. He died on 29 October 1986.

Military offices
Preceded by Sir Francis Mellersh	Commandant-General of the RAF Regiment; 1954–1957	Succeeded by James Fuller-Good
