= Listed buildings in Gonalston =

Gonalston is a civil parish in the Newark and Sherwood district of Nottinghamshire, England. The parish contains eight listed buildings that are recorded in the National Heritage List for England. All the listed buildings are designated at Grade II, the lowest of the three grades, which is applied to "buildings of national importance and special interest". The parish contains the village of Gonalston and the surrounding countryside. All the listed buildings are in the village, and consist of houses, cottages, a farmhouse and a barn, a church, a former rectory, a smithy and a telephone kiosk.

== Buildings ==
Name and location	Photograph	Date	Notes
Manor Cottages; 53.02065°N 0.98925°W		Mid 17th century	The cottages have a timber framed core, they were encased in brick in the early 19th century, and have roofs partly in tile and partly in pantile. There is a single storey and attics, five bays, and a later rear wing. On the front is a gabled porch, a doorway, and casement windows, some with segmental heads, and in the attic are two gabled dormers.
Barn, Manor Farm; 53.02032°N 0.98841°W	—	Mid 17th century	The barn is timber framed with brick nogging, mainly encased in brick and partly rendered, on a stone plinth, and it has a pantile roof with brick coped gables and kneelers. The barn contains a large doorway, a smaller doorway, and lozenge vents.
Manor Farm House; 53.02031°N 0.98909°W		Late 17th century	The farmhouse is in red brick, with floor bands, and a roof of tile at the front and pantile at the rear, with brick coped gables and kneelers. There are two storeys and attics, and three bays, and a two-bay rear wing. In the centre is a gabled porch with dentilled eaves, and an arched entrance with a keystone. Two semicircular steps lead to the inner doorway, which has a fanlight and a keystone. The windows are sashes, and in the attic are three gabled dormers. In the centre at the rear is a three-storey stair turret.
The Old Rectory; 53.02097°N 0.98487°W		Early 18th century	The rectory, later a private house, and the attached outbuildings are in red brick. The house has dentilled eaves, and a tile roof with brick coped gables and kneelers. There are two storeys, a double depth plan and three bays. In the centre is an open porch with slim columns and a dentilled cornice, and a doorway with a fanlight. Above the doorway is a round-arched stair light, and the other windows are sash and casement windows under segmental arches. Attached to the house are outbuildings, some of which have been converted for residential use.
Gonalston Hall; 53.02164°N 0.98600°W	—	1837	A small country house that was remodelled from a cottage orné by T. C. Hine in 1851–52. It is in blue lias and brick, with slate roofs. The west front has quoins, two storeys and attics, and three bays. Attached at the left is a circular four-storey tower with a conical copper roof and a weathervane. To the right is a polygonal bay window with a coped parapet. The arched doorway has a chamfered surround, a fanlight, and a decorative keystone. To the left and recessed is a three-storey two-bay wing with an embattled parapet. The windows in the house are casements, some with mullions and/or transoms.
The Smithy; 53.01991°N 0.98810°W		1843	The smithy is in red brick with a pantile roof. There is a single storey and seven bays, with the gabled end facing the street. In the end is a doorway over which is an inscribed board, and surrounding them is a large horseshoe in painted brick with a dated and initialled stone plaque in the apex. Along the side are doorways, two horizontally-sliding sash windows and a casement window.
St Laurence's Church; 53.02016°N 0.98448°W		1853	The church was rebuilt by T. C. Hine and Evans. It is in stone with slate roofs, and consists of a nave with a clerestory, a north aisle, a south porch, a chancel and a northwest steeple. The steeple has a tower with two stages, a chamfered plinth, a band, buttresses, a northeast stair turret, the bell openings have two lights and hood moulds, and a small spire with lucarnes. At the west end is a three-light window, over which is a quatrefoil, both with hood moulds.
Telephone kiosk 53.01985°N 0.98822°W		1935	The K6 type telephone kiosk in Gonalston Lane was designed by Giles Gilbert Scott. Constructed in cast iron with a square plan and a dome, it has three unperforated crowns in the top panels.
