= Driesell =

Driesell is a surname. Notable people with the name include:

- Chuck Driesell (born 1962), American basketball coach
- Lefty Driesell (1931–2024), American basketball coach

== See also ==
- Drissell
