= Listed buildings in Epperstone =

Epperstone is a civil parish in the Newark and Sherwood district of Nottinghamshire, England. The parish contains 22 listed buildings that are recorded in the National Heritage List for England. Of these, one is listed at Grade I, the highest of the three grades, and the others are at Grade II, the lowest grade. The parish contains the village of Epperstone and the surrounding countryside. Most of the listed buildings are houses, cottages and associated structures, farmhouses and farm buildings, including three pigeoncotes. The other listed buildings include a church, a former chapel, a former mill, a pinfold, a former library and a telephone kiosk.

== Key ==
Grade	Criteria
I	Buildings of exceptional interest, sometimes considered to be internationally important
II	Buildings of national importance and special interest

== Buildings ==
Name and location	Photograph	Date	Notes	Grade
Holy Cross Church; 53.03012°N 1.03111°W		13th century	The church has been altered and extended through the centuries, with restorations during the 19th century. It is built in stone with some render and brick, and has roofs of lead, tile and pantile. The church consists of a nave with a low clerestory, a south aisle, a south porch, a chancel, a north vestry, and a west steeple. The steeple has a tower with two stages, diagonal buttresses, a plinth with chamfered and moulded bands, gargoyles, an embattled parapet and a recessed octagonal spire. It contains an arched west window with three lights, a south doorway, clock faces, and two-light bell openings.	I
Pigeoncote opposite The Cottage; 53.02896°N 1.02716°W		Late 17th century	The pigeoncote, which stands isolated in a field, is in red brick with a dentilled floor band, dentilled eaves, and a tile roof with brick crow-stepped gables and kneelers. There are two storeys and a loft, and a single bay. It contains slit vents, in the east side is a segmental-arched doorway, and in the loft is a panel with a triangular head and a raised surround, containing five rows of openings and flight perches.	II
Poplars, outbuildings and barn with water pump 53.03150°N 1.02904°W	—	Late 17th century	The house is in red brick with a floor band, dentilled and dogtooth eaves, and a tile roof with brick coped gables and kneelers. There are two storeys and attics, and three bays, a right lean-to, a single-story wing on the left, and a two-storey single-bay rear wing. On the front is a lean-to porch, and casement windows with segmental heads. By the rear wing is an iron water pump with a decorative spout and handle, and attached is a single-storey three-bay outbuilding. Beyond this is a two-storey three-bay barn with a pantile roof.	II
The Old Rectory; 53.03038°N 1.03154°W		c. 1700	The rectory, later a private house, is rendered and has a floor band, and a tile roof with coped gables and kneelers. There are two storeys and attics, and four bays, the outer bays projecting and gabled. In the centre are two canted bay windows, and the windows are sashes. In the right bay are horizontally-sliding sash windows, and in the attic is a gabled half-dormer.	II
Belvedere Cottage; 53.02832°N 1.03063°W		Early 18th century	The cottage, which was later extended, is in painted brick, with a roof of tile and pantile, the right gable coped and with kneelers. There is a single storey with an attic, five bays, and a rear lean-to. On the front is a gabled porch, a doorway to the left and casement windows; all the openings have segmental heads. Above the two right windows are sloping tile hoods on decorative brackets, and in the attic are two gabled dormers.	II
Den Cottages; 53.02922°N 1.02852°W		Early 18th century	Three cottages, later two, in red brick, partly on a stone plinth, with a floor band, dentilled and dogtooth eaves, and a tile roof with brick coped gables and kneelers. There are two storeys and attics, a main range of five bays, and a single-storey rear wing. The doorway and the windows, which are casements, have segmental-arched heads. In the attic is a gabled dormer.	II
Pigeoncote, gateways, barn and wall, Epperstone Manor; 53.02983°N 1.03150°W		Early 18th century	The pigeoncote is in red brick, and has a floor band and a pyramidal tile roof. It contains a doorway with a quoined surround, above which is a panel and openings for birds. Attached to it is a gabled stone gateway with an arched entrance and a hood mould. It is flanked by stepped buttresses, and above it is a panel with a pointed arch containing a coat of arms. Beyond this is a barn in red brick on a stone plinth, with dentilled eaves and a pantile roof, and attached to it is a red brick wall with stone coping extending for 22 metres (72 ft).	II
Orchard Cottages; 53.03130°N 1.02863°W		Early 18th century	A row of three cottages, rendered over timber framing and red brick, the timber framing on the gable end facing the road exposed, and with a pantile roof. There are two storeys and six bays. On the front are three doorways and casement windows.	II
Pigeoncote, garage and walls, Poplars; 53.03139°N 1.02943°W		Early 18th century	The pigeoncote incorporates a stable and a granary, and a garage is attached. They are in red brick, and the pigeoncote has dentilled eaves, and a roof in pantile and tile with crow-stepped gables and kneelers. There are two storeys and two bays, and it contains two doorways. At the rear is a lean-to, above which are three rows of flight perches and openings. Projecting from the front is the garage, with a doorway and sash windows. Attached is a brick wall with shaped coping, containing a gateway, a stone trough and feeding bays.	II
Rossellewood Farmhouse; 53.05499°N 1.03592°W		Early 18th century	The farmhouse is in red brick with dogtooth eaves and a pantile roof. There are two storeys and attics, a front range of three bays, a lean-to on the right, and a lower rear wing with two storeys and two bays. In the centre is a doorway, and the windows are sashes under segmental arches.	II
Criftin Farmhouse; 53.04026°N 1.05516°W	—	Mid 18th century	The farmhouse is in red brick, with dentilled eaves, and a tile roof with brick coped gables and kneelers. There are two storeys and attics, a main range of three bays, a projecting single-storey three-bay lean-to on the front, and extensions to the right and at the rear. The windows are casements, those in the upper floor with flush brick wedge lintels. In the attic is a central semicircular panel with a rusticated surround and a keystone, flanked by sash windows under segmental arches.	II
Epperstone Manor and walls 53.03000°N 1.03244°W		Mid 18th century	A house that has been extended, at one time used as a training school, and later converted into flats, it is rendered, on a chamfered plinth, with stone dressings, floor bands, moulded eaves, and tile roofs with coped gables, kneelers and orb finials. There are two storeys and attics, and a garden front of nine bays, the middle and outer bays projecting and gabled. On the front is a doorway with a four-centred arched head and a fanlight, the windows are casements, and in the roof are two gabled half-dormers. In the garden is a balustraded wall, and attached to the rear of the house is a stepped wall with shaped coping.	II
Former Methodist chapel, wall and gateway 53.03216°N 1.02848°W		Mid 18th century	The original chapel is in stone, in 1891 a lower schoolroom in red brick was added to the front, and both parts have hipped tile roofs. The chapel has two round-arched lancet windows and two cross-casements. The schoolroom has a deep plinth with a chamfered blue brick band, sprocketed eaves, and all the openings have segmental heads. In front is a red brick wall with blue brick coping, ending is a brick pier with chamfered edges and stone coping. Together with a similar dated pier, it forms a gateway with an iron gate.	II
Old Mill House; 53.02183°N 1.01707°W		Mid 18th century	A house and cottage later combined into one house, it is in roughcast red brick, with an eaves band and a pantile roof. There are two storeys and attics, a front range of six bays and a rear two-storey wing. On the front are two doorways, with a hood on brackets over the main doorway. Above this is a casement window, and the other windows are sashes.	II
The Old Forge and attached outbuildings 53.02940°N 1.02887°W		Mid 18th century	The house is in red brick on a plinth of brick and stone, with dogtooth eaves, and a tile roof with brick coped gables and kneelers. There are two storeys and an attic, and three bays. Steps with an iron handrail lead up to the central doorway that has a gabled hood on brackets. The windows are casements, those in the ground floor with segmental heads. To the right is an outbuilding with a single-storey and loft, and two bays, on a plinth, containing two blocked doorways with segmental arches, and further to the right is a single-storey outbuilding without openings.	II
The Old House; 53.02820°N 1.02553°W		Mid 18th century	The house, which was later extended, is in red brick with stone dressings, tile roofs with coped gables and kneelers, two storeys and attics. The older part has three bays, a floor band, dogtooth eaves, sash windows and a rear wing. The later part projects and has a decorative ridge and a finial. It is in Gothic style, and contains lancet windows and mullioned and transomed windows.	II
The Papermill; 53.02186°N 1.01741°W		Mid 18th century	The mill, which was rebuilt after a fire in 1809, was converted into a house in 1985. The original block is in stone with two storeys, and it contains a doorway and casement windows, some with segmental heads. To the right is a single-storey wing containing a cart entrance, linking with a later block in red brick with two storeys. All the parts have pantile roofs.	II
Pinfold; 53.02905°N 1.02601°W		Late 18th century	The pinfold has walls in stone with rounded coping, and a rectangular plan, with sides of 8 metres (26 ft) by 5 metres (16 ft). In the southwest corner is a gateway with a wooden gate.	II
Outbuildings, The Old Forge; 53.02930°N 1.02897°W		Early 19th century	The outbuildings are in red brick with a pantile roof. There is a single storey and three bays. On the front are two doorways and a horizontally-sliding sash window.	II
Barn and outbuilding, The Old House; 53.02841°N 1.02532°W		Early 19th century	The barn and attached outbuilding are in red brick with pantile roofs. The barn has dogtooth eaves, and contains a large doorway and a blocked window. The lower outbuilding to the right has dentilled eaves and a hipped roof.	II
Millholme Models; 53.02907°N 1.02904°W		1843	Originally a public library, later used as a workshop, it is in red brick with stone dressings, a raised eaves band, and a hipped slate roof. There is a single storey and two bays. On the front is a doorway with an inscribed and dated wedge lintel, and to its left is a two-light casement window.	II
Telephone kiosk 53.02959°N 1.02912°W		1935	The K6 type telephone kiosk on the corner of Main Street and Chapel Lane was designed by Giles Gilbert Scott. Constructed in cast iron with a square plan and a dome, it has three unperforated crowns in the top panels.	II
