= Richard Roe (clockmaker) =

English clockmaker

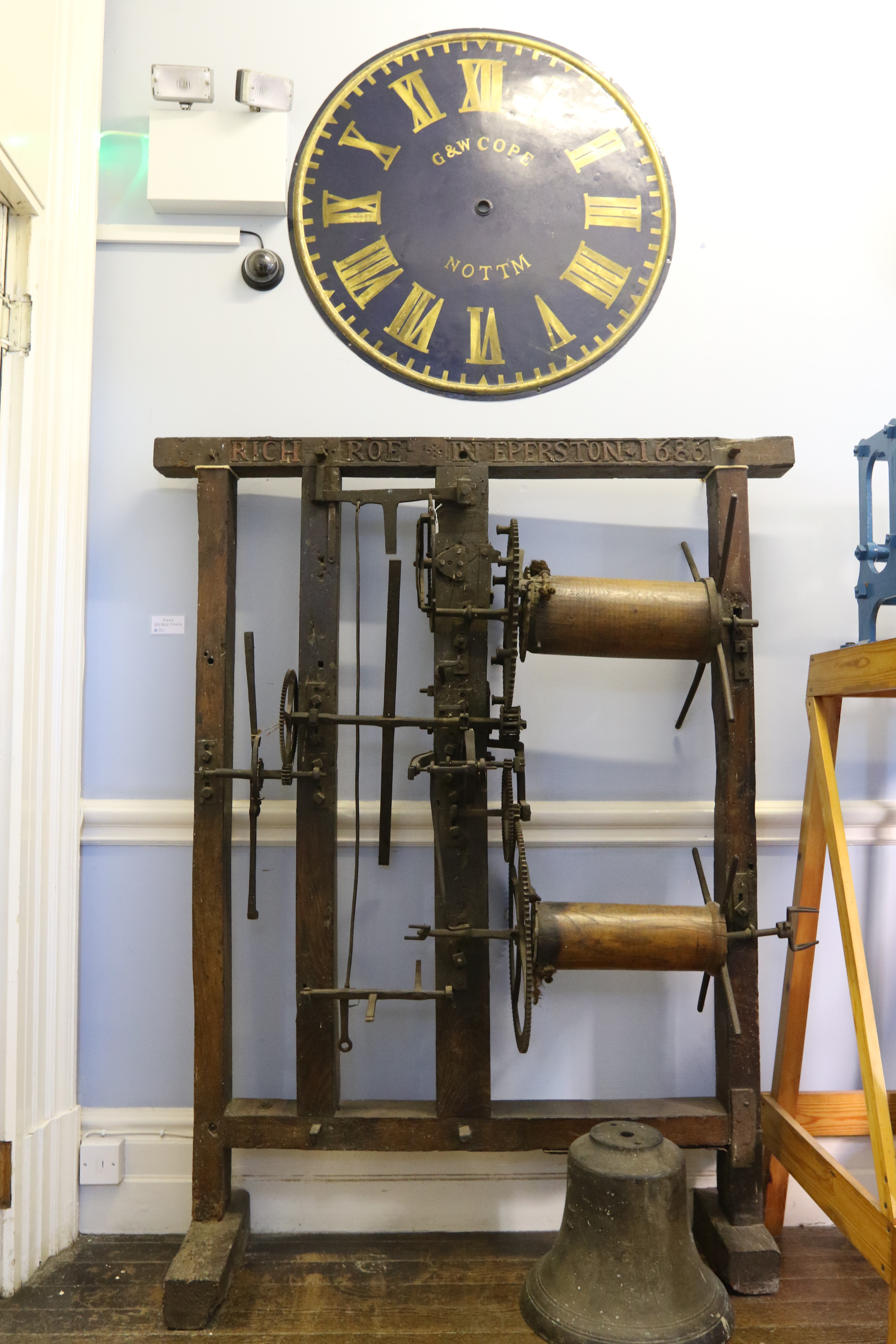
Door frame clock made for St Mary's Church, Plumtree in 1686. Now in the British Horological Museum, Upton Hall

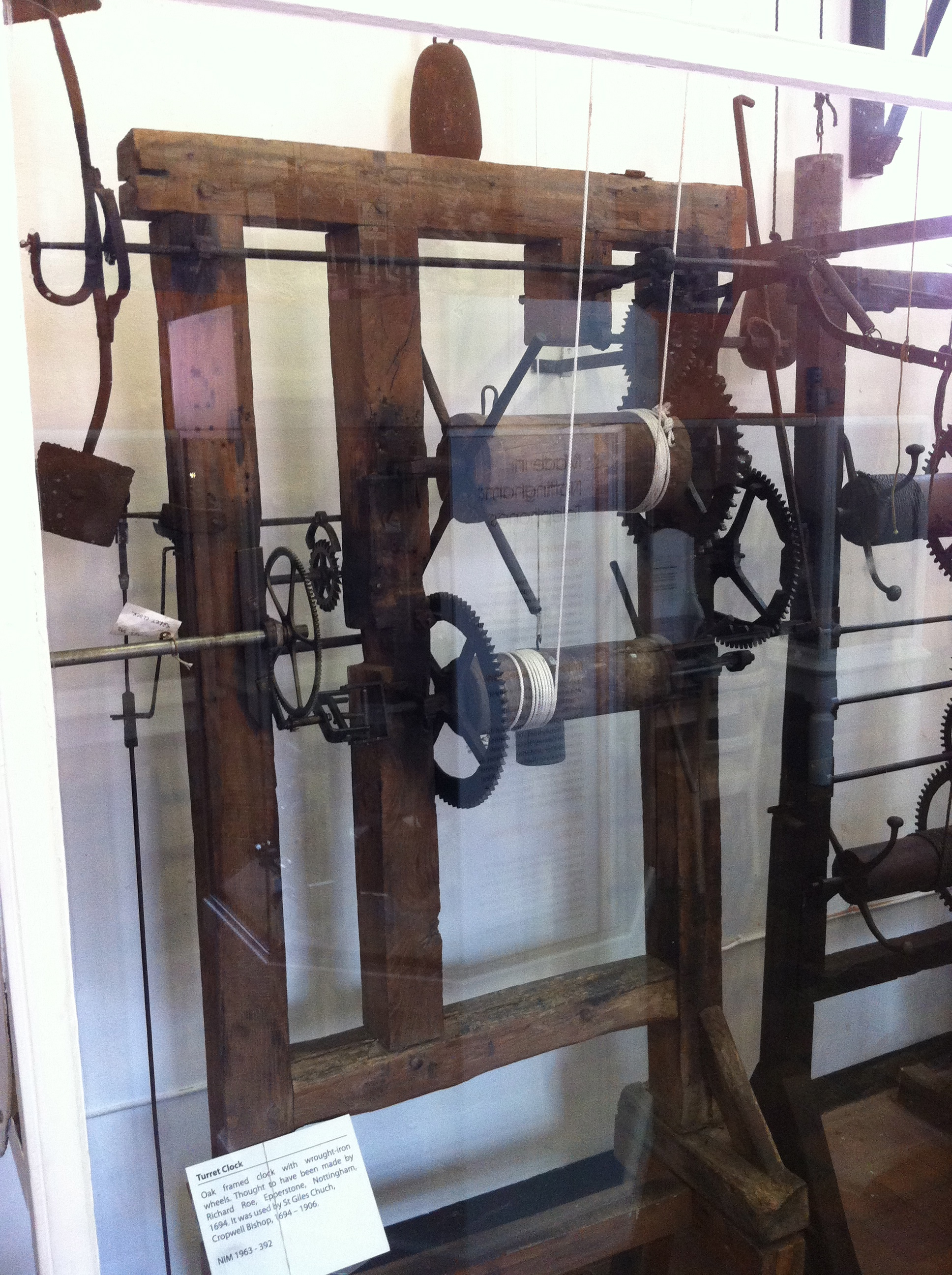
Door frame clock made for St Giles' Church, Cropwell Bishop in 1694. Now in Nottingham Industrial Museum

Richard Roe, also Rowe, (c.1640 – 1718) of Epperstone was one of the earliest clockmakers in Nottinghamshire.

== Life ==
He married on 12 August 1660 in Holy Trinity Church, Lambley to Mary. He became churchwarden at Holy Cross Church, Epperstone in 1668 but was a Quaker.

He produced several clocks, known as door frame clocks, for churches in Nottinghamshire.

He is also known to have produced some lantern clocks.

He was buried at Clipston, Nottinghamshire on 25 August 1718.

== Works ==
=== Door frame clocks ===
- St Mary's Church, Car Colston 1678
- St. Peter and St. Paul's Church, Shelford 1680 (Replaced in 1880. Whereabouts unknown.)
- St Margaret's Church, Owthorpe 1680
- Church of St. John of Beverley, Whatton 1683 (Probably removed in 1910. Whereabouts unknown.)
- St Mary's Church, East Leake 1683 (not confirmed as Richard Roe, but similar in style)
- Church of St. Mary Magdalene, Hucknall 1685
- Church of St. Mary the Virgin, Plumtree 1686 (now at the British Horological Institute, Upton Hall) removed from Plumtree in 1889.
- Holy Cross Church, Epperstone 1688 (Removed in 1854. Whereabouts unknown.)
- Holy Trinity Church, Rolleston 1690
- St. Giles' Church, Cropwell Bishop 1694 (now in Nottingham Industrial Museum).
- St Swithin’s Church, Wellow about 1699
- St Nicholas' Church, Nottingham 1699 (Removed in 1830. Whereabouts unknown.)
- St Michael's Church, Linby, 1700
- St Mary's Church, Nottingham 1707 (removed in 1807, now in St Mary's Church, Staunton in the Vale).
- Priory Church of St Peter, Thurgarton date unknown. Removed in 1879.
