= James Fuller-Good =

- Born: 20 September 1903
- Died: 11 May 1983 (aged 79)
- Military career
- Allegiance: United Kingdom
- Branch: Royal Air Force
- Service years: 1921–1959
- Rank: Air vice-marshal
- Commands: RAF Regiment (1957–59); No. 22 Group (1953–57); AHQ Malaya (1951–52); RAF Cardington (1949–51); No. 293 Wing (1943–44); RAF Duxford (1939–43); No. 66 Squadron (1938–39)
- Conflicts: Second World War; Malayan Emergency
- Awards: Companion of the Order of the Bath; Commander of the Royal Victorian Order; Commander of the Order of the British Empire; Bronze Star Medal (United States)

Air Vice Marshal James Laurence Fuller Fuller-Good, CB, CVO, CBE (20 September 1903 – 11 May 1983) was a Royal Air Force pilot in the 1920s, a senior officer during the Second World War and a senior RAF commander in the 1950s.

Military offices
Preceded by Walter Merton	Air Officer Commanding No. 22 Group; 1953–1957	Succeeded by Roy Faville
Preceded by Brian Yarde	Commandant-General of the RAF Regiment; 1957–1959	Succeeded by Jack Harris
