= St Mary's Church, Staunton in the Vale =

St Mary's Church, Staunton
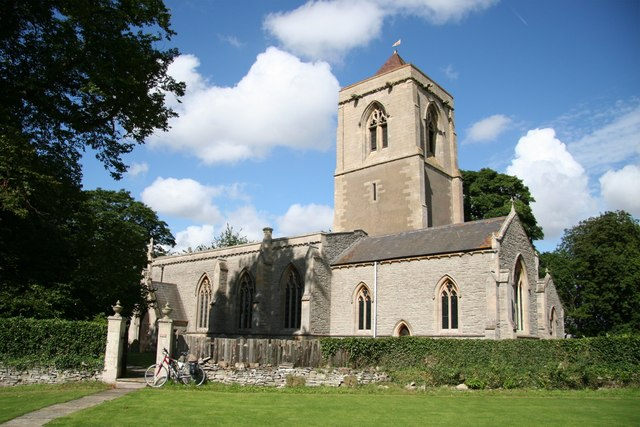
- St Mary's Church, Staunton
- St Mary's Church, Staunton
- 52°58′50″N 0°48′7″W
- Location: Staunton, Nottinghamshire
- Country: England
- Denomination: Church of England

History
- Status: Parish church

Architecture
- Functional status: Active
- Heritage designation: Grade II* listed
- Designated: 16 January 1967
- Style: Gothic

Administration
- Diocese: Diocese of Southwell and Nottingham
- Archdeaconry: Newark
- Deanery: Newark and Southwell
- Benefice: Staunton w Flawborough
- Parish: Staunton and Flawborough

St Mary’s Church, Staunton-in-the-Vale is a Grade II* listed Church of England parish church in Staunton, Nottinghamshire.

== History ==
The oldest part is the tower which dates from the 14th century. Most of the rest was rebuilt in 1854 by E. J. Willson commissioned by Guilm Malger Staunton. It was restored again in 1936.

== Memorials ==
- Alicia de Loudham (wife of Sir John Loudham and daughter of Robert de Kirkton) (d. 1344)
- William de Staunton (son of Mauger de Staunton) (d. c.1250)
- Sir William de Staunton (d. 1326)
- Robert Staunton (d. 1582)
- Gilbert Charlton (d. 1706) and his wife Anne (d. 1732)
- Anne Brough (d. 1732)
- Job Staunton Charlton (d. 1778)
- Job Brough (d. 1795)
- Revd. John Mounsey ca. 1827 by R. Harston of Newark
- Revd. John Staunton ca. 1851 by E. Marshal of Newark

== Clock ==
A door frame clock of 1707 by Richard Roe of Epperstone was obtained from St Mary's Church, Nottingham for a cost of £10 (equivalent to £800 in 2025) and installed in 1808.

== Bells ==
The church contains a ring of 5 bells. The tenor dates from 1604 by Henry Oldfield with a weight of 356kg. The 4th dates from 1738 by George Oldfield, the 2nd and 3rd date from 1827 by James Harrison and the treble is of 1742 by Thomas Hedderly.

== Organ ==
There is reference to the church containing a barrel organ before 1852 which is no longer extant. A new barrel organ by Forster & Andrews with 4 stops and 29 keys with 3 barrels was obtained in 1852 for the cost of £55 (equivalent to £6,600 in 2025). This was restored in 1959 by Herbert Friskney of Sutton-on-Trent..

A 2 manual and pedal 12 stop house organ built for W.G. Player by Brindley & Foster in 1896 for his house in Lenton was moved here in 1929 by Roger Yates. It was restored in 2009 when it was re-sited at the back of the church..
