= Holy Cross Church, Epperstone =

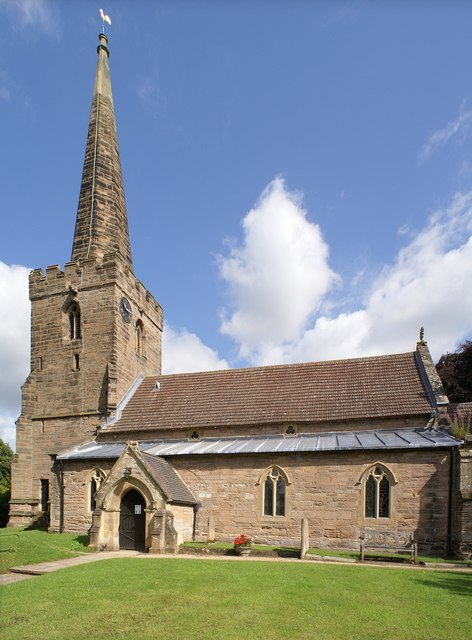
- Holy Cross Church, Eppestone
- Holy Cross Church, Epperstone
- 53°1′48.71″N 1°1′52.29″W
- OS grid reference: SK 65076 48527
- Location: Epperstone
- Country: England
- Denomination: Church of England

History
- Dedication: Holy Cross

Architecture
- Heritage designation: Grade I listed

Administration
- Diocese: Diocese of Southwell and Nottingham
- Archdeaconry: Nottingham
- Deanery: Gedling
- Parish: Epperstone

Holy Cross Church is a Grade I listed parish church in the Church of England at Epperstone in the Diocese of Southwell and Nottingham.

== History ==
The church dates from the 13th century. It was restored in 1853 and 1879. It is built of Epperstone stone, with Mansfield stone for the windows and arcade. Services are held regularly for the parishioners. There is also a graveyard, with a number of headstones.

The end window of the aisle, the small buttress on the north wall and the doorway beside it all appear to belong to the early years of the 14th century. Later in the 14th century the arcade, tower and spire were built, the tower being inserted into the west end of the nave. The larger buttresses on the north side were also added, and the nave wall was heightened. The nave roof is 17th century work.

The church serves a joint parish with:

- St Laurence's Church, Gonalston
- St Swithun's Church, Woodborough
- St Peter & St Paul's Church, Oxton

== Memorials ==
Memorials include:

- Robertus Squire, 1701. South chancel
- Christopheri Raleigh Seton, 1748
- Elizabeth Hill, 1756
- John Odingsells 1655. South aisle
- C14 reclining effigy, east wall

== Clock and bells ==
A clock was installed in the tower in 1686 by Richard Roe of Epperstone. This was replaced in 1854 by a new one by G. & F. Cope.

There are four bells at Epperstone, but only three can be rung as such, as one bell serves the clock, which chimes on the hour. The bells are these:

- Treble, with inscription, 1742, God save his Church.
- Tenor, T. Taylor & Co Loughborough 1865.
- Second, God save his Church 1729.
- Third, Jhesus be our spede 1590.

== See also ==
- Grade I listed buildings in Nottinghamshire
- Listed buildings in Epperstone
