= Tim Thorn =

Royal Air Force officer (1942–2026)

- Born: 21 September 1942; Atbara, Sudan
- Died: 19 April 2026 (aged 83)
- Military career
- Allegiance: United Kingdom
- Branch: Royal Air Force
- Service years: c. 1961–95
- Rank: Air Commodore
- Nickname: "Tiger"
- Commands: RAF Regiment (1993–95); RAF Cranwell (1987–88); No. II(AC) Squadron (1980–83)
- Awards: Air Force Cross; Queen's Commendation for Valuable Service in the Air

Air Commodore Timothy Gane Thorn, AFC, FRAeS (21 September 1942 – 19 April 2026), often known as Tim Thorn and nicknamed "Tiger", was a British Royal Air Force officer and, up to January 2010, a pilot and flying instructor at 6 Air Experience Flight at RAF Benson, Oxfordshire.

== Early life and education ==
Thorn was born in Atbara, Sudan on 21 September 1942, during the Second World War. He attended Ipswich School from 1953 to 1961. Just after leaving school he represented Suffolk in the Minor Counties cricket competition as an 'opening' fast bowler. He entered the Royal Air Force College Cranwell as a flight cadet in September 1961. He graduated with his pilot wings in 1964 and on completion of the Advanced Flying Training he was selected to become a flying instructor straight out of training.

He represented the RAF at Rugby and played for Blackheath Rugby Club.

== RAF career ==
In May 1966, Thorn ejected from his aircraft following a mid-air collision with 4 other aircraft in which two aircraft crashed onto the outskirts of Nottingham. Thorn represented Great Britain in the bobsleigh at the 1968 Winter Olympics, Grenoble, France. At the European Championships just prior to the Olympics he won bronze in the event. On completion of his flying instructors tour he started his succession of fighter squadron tours commencing in January 1968. Four Hawker Hunter tours followed: No. 8 Squadron based at RAF Muharraq, Bahrain (1968–69), No. 4 Squadron and No. II(AC) Squadron based at RAF Gutersloh, Germany (1969–71) and No. 234 Squadron based at RAF Chivenor, SW England, where he graduated from the Pilot Attack Instructors Course. Promoted to squadron leader in July 1972, having turned down the opportunity to become a Queen's Equerry, he was seconded to the British Army and joined the Parachute Regiment with 16 Parachute Brigade where he completed over one hundred parachute descents, one of which the parachute failed to open on an exercise parachuting into Schleswig-Holstein. The tour was shortened to attend the Indian Defence Services Staff College, in South India for a year in 1975.

On completion of Staff College, a return to flying duties on the new single-seat Jaguar aircraft followed, first as a Deputy OC No 41 (F) Sqn based at RAF Coltishall, where he was awarded a Queen's Commendation for Valuable Service in the Air.

Promoted to wing commander in July 1979, he completed the six-month Air Warfare Course at the RAF College, Cranwell, before assuming command of No. II (AC) Squadron in 1980, flying the Jaguar at RAF Laarbruch. Thorn was the first and only jaguar pilot to achieve one hundred percent air-to-ground strafe scores on no less than seven occasions, four of which both Aden guns of 60 rounds each fired simultaneously achieved 120 hits on Nordhorn range, West Germany and the other 3 with a single Aden gun firing 60 rounds achieving 60 hits on each sortie. He was awarded the Air Force Cross in December 1982. In January 1983 he handed over command of No II (AC) Squadron to Wing Commander Hoare. He was posted to the Operations Directorate in the Ministry of Defence with responsibility for future RAF air to ground weapons which included the development of a new nuclear weapon. In 1985 he was appointed a Fellow of the Royal Aeronautical Society (FRAeS).

Thorn was promoted to group captain and was appointed Station Commander, RAF Cranwell in September 1987 before being succeeded by Group Captain T.E.L. Jarron.

He next held an appointment at the Training Command HQ before attending the Royal College of Defence Studies (RCDS) in London during the year 1990. During the year's course he was promoted to air commodore and at the end of the course was appointed the Senior Air Staff Officer (SASO) at HQ RAF Germany in January 1991. He held this post until March 1993 when he became the first air commodore to be appointed the Commandant-General of the RAF Regiment whilst holding the post of Director of Fire Services, and Head of the RAF Strike Command Provost Branch.

== Nine lives ==
Thorn was renowned for his '9 lives' after surviving 10 major airborne emergencies:

8 July 1965-Jet Provost (XX549). With Flying Officer E Hempson Flamed-out (jet engine stopped). Landed safely at RAF Little Rissington.
26 May 1966 - Jet Provost. With Pilot Officer M Sedman (student) ejected after mid-air collision with four aircraft in formation over Woodborough, Nottinghamshire, north of Nottingham.
28 September 1967 - Jet Provost. With Pilot Officer Mussett (student) landed with only 2 wheels locked down.
12 February 1969-Hunter FR(10)(XE599). Landed with no nose under-carriage at Bahrain Airport.
27 May 1969 - Hunter FR(10)(XF436). Aircraft caught fire after take-off. Force landed with no engine.
28 July 1969 - Hunter FR(10)(XF441). Only one wing fuel tank fed. Safe emergency landing.
11 May 1970 - Hunter FR(10)(XF428). Aircraft engine flamed-out (Stopped) 300 feet (91 m) after take-off. Turned aircraft back towards runway for dead stick (no engine) landing.
24 May 1974 - Chipmunk (WZ877) With Air Cadet, engine seized -Forced landed on golf course.
10 September 1974 - Schleswig-Holstein. Survived parachute descent with unopened parachute jumping from Hercules aircraft flying at 650 feet (200 m) at night.
13 December 1997 - Bulldog (XX639) with Air Cadet experienced a catastrophic engine failure at 350 feet (110 m) after take-off. Turned aircraft back to force-land safely back on reciprocal runway.

== Retirement and death ==
After he had prematurely retired from the RAF having achieved over 8,000 single seat flying hours and a total of 123 parachute descents, Thorn joined De Beers as the Head of Security for the Diamond Company with worldwide responsibility. At the same time he joined the Royal Air Force Volunteer Reserve (Training) Branch in December 1995 with the rank of flying officer. In December 1997 he was awarded a Green Endorsement for an instance of Exceptional Flying Skill and Judgement when flying with an Air Training Corps (ATC) cadet in a RAF Tutor aircraft he successfully completed a forced landing back onto the airfield from 350 feet after the engine had failed and the propeller stopped. He was promoted to the rank of flight lieutenant in 2003. After 13 years service in the RAFVR he was awarded the Cadet medal in 2008. In November 2000, together with the Metropolitan Police Flying Squad he was heavily involved in successfully denying an attempt to steal £350 million display of De Beers diamonds (the Millennium Star and 11 unique Blue Diamonds) from the Millennium Dome, Greenwich, London. In 2005, he retired from De Beers at the age of 60 years and formed his own Security Consultancy Company dealing with the Jewellery Retail Trade and Diamond/Gold Mines. As a consequence of a change of RAF policy on the maximum age of RAF pilots he was forced to cease flying on 31 January 2010 but continued to run his consultancy until April 2019 when he finally retired at the age of 77 years.

Thorn died from oesophageal cancer on 19 April 2026, aged 83.

Military offices
Preceded by R Fowler	Officer Commanding No. II (AC) Squadron; 1980–1983	Succeeded by F J Hoare
Preceded by David Hawkins	Commandant-General of the RAF Regiment; 1993–1995	Succeeded by I McNeil
