= Andrew Hall (RAF officer) =

British Air Force officer

- Military career
- Allegiance: United Kingdom
- Branch: Royal Air Force
- Service years: 1985 – present
- Rank: Air Commodore
- Commands: RAF Regiment (2013–16); RAF Honington (2010–12)
- Conflicts: The Troubles; Operation Deliberate Force; War in Afghanistan; Iraq War
- Awards: Member of the Order of the British Empire

Air Commodore Andrew Jonathan "Andy" Hall, MBE is a Royal Air Force officer. From May 2013 to April 2016, he served as Commandant-General of the RAF Regiment.

== Military career ==
On 15 August 1985, the then Aircraftman Hall was commissioned in the Security Branch of the Royal Air Force as an acting pilot officer. He was given the service number 8024358J. On 15 February 1986, he was regraded to pilot officer. He was promoted to flying officer on 15 February 1988, and to flight lieutenant on 15 February 1992. From 1 June and 20 December 1995, he saw active service in the former Republic of Yugoslavia as part of the NATO bombing campaign, for which he was appointed a Member of the Order of the British Empire "in recognition of [his] gallant and distinguished service". On 1 July 1997, as part of the half yearly promotions, he was promoted to squadron leader. On 1 July 2002, as part of the half yearly promotions, he was promoted to wing commander.

From 2010 to 2012, he served as Station Commander of RAF Honington. He then attended the Defence Academy of the United Kingdom based in Shrivenham. On 13 May 2013, he was promoted to air commodore and appointed Force Protection Force Commander, Air Officer Force Protection, Commandant-General of the RAF Regiment and Air Officer Royal Air Force Police. He stepped down from those appointments in April 2016.

Military offices
Preceded by Nick Bray	Commandant-General of the RAF Regiment; 2013–2016	Succeeded by Frank Clifford
