= Michael Smeath =

Air Vice-Marshal Michael Smeath CB CBE
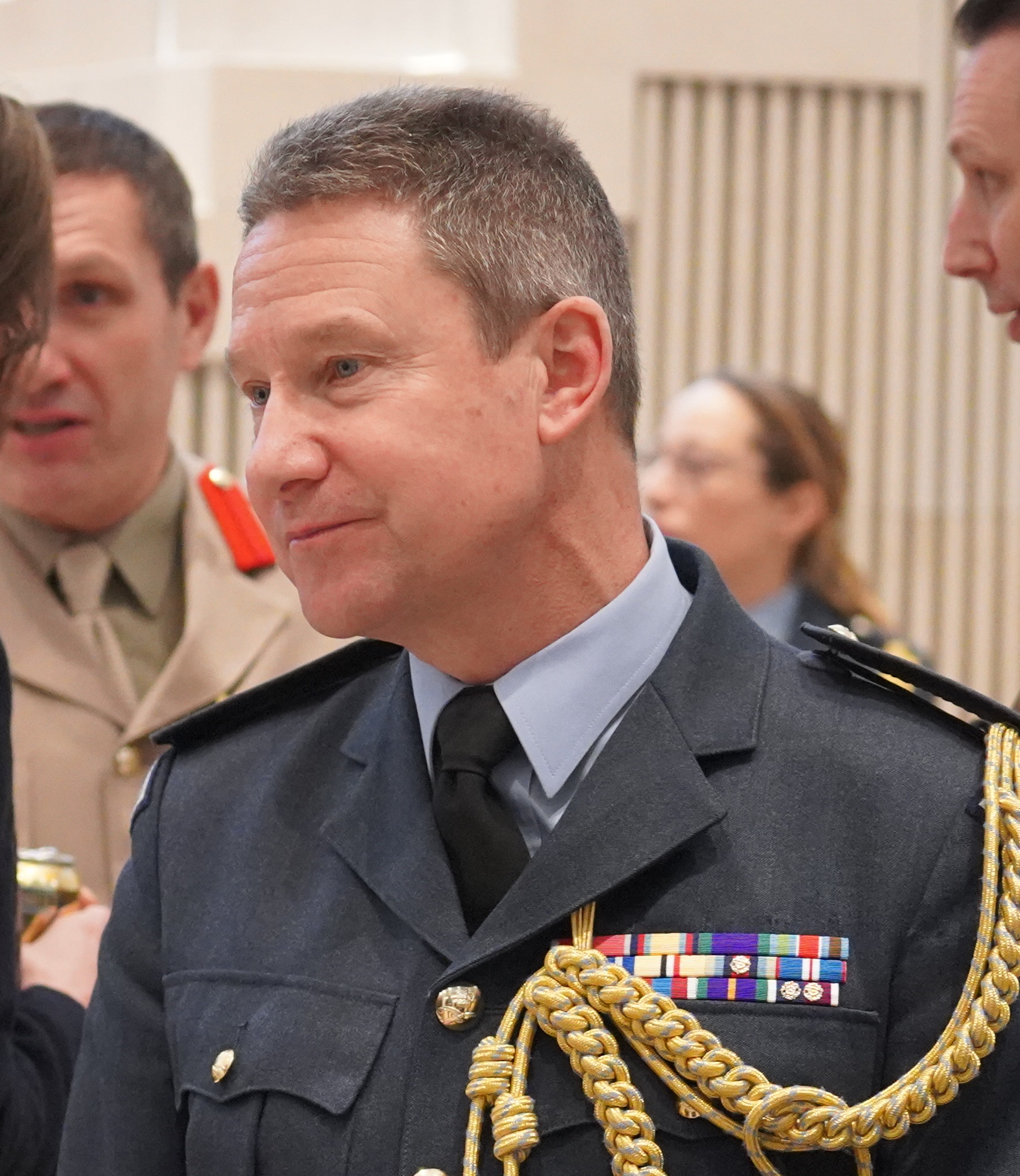
- Smeath in 2023
- Born: 2 October 1967 (age 59)
- Military career
- Allegiance: United Kingdom
- Branch: Royal Air Force
- Service years: 1989–2026
- Rank: Air Vice-Marshal
- Commands: RAF Regiment; RAF Honington; No. 34 Squadron RAF Regiment
- Conflicts: Gulf War; Bosnian War; Iraq War; War in Afghanistan
- Awards: Companion of the Order of the Bath; Commander of the Order of the British Empire

Air Vice-Marshal Michael John Smeath, CB CBE (born 2 October 1967) is a former senior Royal Air Force officer.

== Early life and education ==
Smeath was born on 2 October 1967 in Woking, Surrey, England.

He attended the William Alvey CE Primary School in Sleaford. He grew up on Hervey Road, and attended Sleaford Secondary Modern School, where he took part in competitive cross country running, and tennis, and competed in cross country running at Lincoln College of Technology, which he left in 1986. He competed at 800 metres in 1986.

He undertook a Bachelor of Science (BSc) degree in international studies with the Open University, graduating in 2006. The same year, he completed a Master of Arts degree in war studies via King's College London. He later studied at Deakin University, Canberra, graduating with an MA in strategic studies.

== RAF career ==
Smeath joined the Royal Air Force (RAF) as an aircraft propulsion engineer in 1987. He rose to the rank of senior aircraftman, before being selected for officer training in 1990. He had worked on the Nimrod at RAF St Mawgan.

Having attended the Royal Air Force College Cranwell, he was commissioned on 21 June 1990 as a pilot officer, with seniority in that rank from 15 January 1989. He served as officer commanding No. 34 Squadron RAF Regiment. In October 1994, he was one of a group of five, taken hostage for five days.

He went on to be Station Commander at RAF Honington in 2014, Liaison Officer to the US Joint Chiefs of Staff Committee in July 2017 and Principal Staff Officer to the Chief of the Defence Staff in August 2018. In February 2020 Smeath was appointed Head of the British Defence Staff and Defence Attaché in Washington, D.C., with effect from August 2020. In January 2023, he was appointed director of the Global Defence Network in the Ministry of Defence; as such, he was head of the UK's military attaché world wide network. He retired from the Royal Air Force on 5 January 2026.

Smeath was appointed a Member of the Order of the British Empire in the 2001 Birthday Honours, and advanced to Commander of the Order of the British Empire in the 2018 New Year Honours. He was appointed a Companion of the Order of the Bath in the 2026 Birthday Honours.

Military offices
Preceded by Gavin Parker	Head of the British Defence Staff – US and Defence Attaché; 2020–2023	Succeeded by Timothy Woods
Preceded by Scott Miller	Commandant-General of the RAF Regiment; 2022–2026	Succeeded by Paul Tavus Hamilton
