= John Harris (RAF officer) =

Royal Air Force Air Marshal (1938-2019)

KCB, CBE John Harris
- Birth name: John Hulme Harris
- Born: 3 June 1938
- Died: 2 July 2019 (aged 81)
- Allegiance: United Kingdom
- Service / branch: Royal Air Force
- Rank: Air Marshall
- Commands: RAF Regiment; No. 18 Group RAF

Air Marshal Sir John Hulme "Win" Harris, KCB, CBE (3 June 1938 – 2 July 2019) was a British Royal Air Force officer and specialist in maritime patrol. He served as Commandant-General of the RAF Regiment and Director-General of Security (RAF) from 1987 to 1989, and Air Officer Commanding No. 18 Group RAF from 1992 to 1996.
