= Steven Abbott =

Royal Air Force Air Commodore (born 1956)

Steven Abbott CBE
- Born: 5 February 1956 (age 70)
- Military career
- Allegiance: United Kingdom
- Branch: Royal Air Force
- Rank: Air Commodore
- Commands: RAF Regiment (2007–10); RAF Honington (2003–05)
- Conflicts: Operation Southern Watch; War in Afghanistan
- Awards: Commander of the Order of the British Empire; Queen's Commendation for Valuable Service

Air Commodore Steven Abbott CBE (born 5 February 1956) is a former senior officer in the Royal Air Force.

== Biography ==
He was educated at the University of East Anglia (BA) and Downing College, Cambridge (MPhil), and the University of Manchester. He was Commandant-General of the RAF Regiment from 2007 until February 2010, Simultaneously holding the post of Air Officer of the RAF Police.

He was a long-serving member of the RAF 'Cresta' Association, competing for the final time (on his penultimate day of RAF service) in 2011.

He is a member of Chatham House and was awarded the Queen's Commendation for Valuable Service in 2000. He is a governor of Culford School.

Military offices
Preceded by Peter Drissell	Commandant-General of the RAF Regiment; 2007–2010	Succeeded by Russell La Forte
