= Driskell =

Driskell is a surname. Notable people with the surname include:

- David Driskell (1931–2020), American artist
- Ethan Driskell (born 2000), American football player
- Fentrice Driskell (born 1979), American politician
- Gretchen Driskell (born 1958), American politician
- James Driskell (born 1959), Canadian man wrongly convicted of murder
- John Driskell Hopkins (born 1971), American singer, musician, songwriter
