= Commandant-General of the RAF Regiment =

Royal Air Force commander of the RAF Regiment

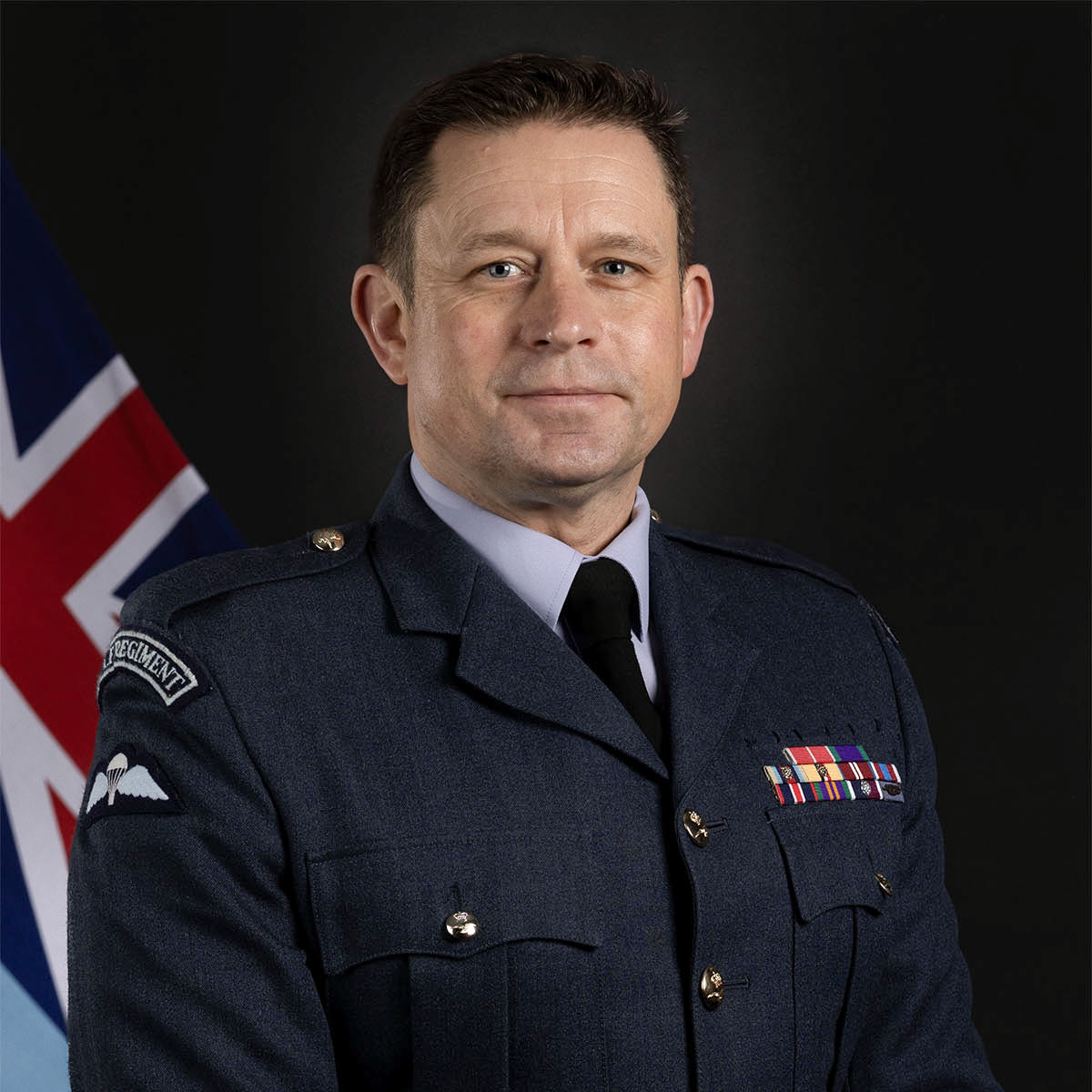
- Incumbent; Paul Tavus Hamilton since February 2026
- RAF Regiment
- Abbreviation: CG RAF Regt
- Member of: Royal Air Force
- Reports to: Chief of the Air Staff
- Formation: January 1942
- First holder: Claude Liardet

The Commandant-General of the RAF Regiment (CG RAF Regt) is the Royal Air Force commander of the RAF Regiment. The post was established in January 1942 immediately prior to the creation of the RAF Regiment. The first two holders of the post were major-generals in the British Army. From 1948 onward, the Commandant-General has been an RAF officer of air rank and tied to the appointment of the senior RAF Regiment commander. These officers all held the rank of air vice-marshal until 1993 when the post was reduced to air commodore to reflect a general downsizing of both the RAF and the RAF Regiment.

== Commandants-general ==
Sources
Ordinal	Date of appointment	Rank on appointment	Name of officer	Other duty
1st	January 1942	Major-General	Sir Claude Liardet	Director-General of Ground Defences at the Air Ministry
2nd	1945	Major-General	A E Robinson	
3rd	30 June 1948	Air Vice-Marshal	H T Lydford	Inspector of Ground Combat Training
4th	26 October 1950	Air Vice-Marshal	S C Strafford	Inspector of Ground Combat Training
5th	1 October 1952	Air Vice-Marshal	Sir Francis Mellersh	Inspector of Ground Combat Training
6th	23 September 1954	Air Vice-Marshal	B C Yarde	Inspector of Ground Defence
7th	12 February 1957	Air Vice-Marshal	J L F Fuller-Good	Inspector of Ground Defence
8th	1 March 1959	Air Vice-Marshal	J H Harris	Inspector of Ground Defence
9th	5 August 1961	Air Vice-Marshal	E M F Grundy	Inspector of Ground Defence
10th	6 January 1962	Air Vice Marshal	K W Godfrey	Inspector of Ground Defence
11th	7 January 1963	Air Vice-Marshal	Sir Bernard Chacksfield	Inspector of Ground Defence
12th	3 May 1968	Air Vice-Marshal	B P Young	Inspector of Ground Defence
13th	6 January 1973	Air Vice-Marshal	D A Pocock	Inspector of Ground Defence
14th	3 May 1975	Air Vice-Marshal	A Griffiths	Inspector of Ground Defence – to 1976; Director-General of Security (RAF) – from 1976
15th	28 May 1977	Air Vice-Marshal	B G Lock	Director-General of Security (RAF)
16th	28 April 1979	Air Vice-Marshal	H Reed-Purvis	Director-General of Security (RAF)
17th	4 August 1983	Air Vice-Marshal	J F G Howe	Director-General of Security (RAF)
18th	30 August 1985	Air Vice-Marshal	D B Leech	Director-General of Security (RAF)
19th	15 December 1987	Air Vice-Marshal	J H Harris	Director-General of Security (RAF)
20th	11 January 1990	Air Vice-Marshal	G C Williams	Director-General of Security (RAF)
21st	25 January 1991	Air Vice-Marshal	D R Hawkins (later Hawkins-Leth)	
22nd	8 March 1993	Air Commodore	T G Thorn	Director of Defence Fire Services
23rd	March 1995	Air Commodore	I W P McNeil	
24th	May 1999	Air Commodore	R C Moore	
25th	1 April 2001	Air Commodore	N A Bairsto	
26th	January 2003	Air Commodore	S Anderton	
27th	March 2005	Air Commodore	P J Drissell	
28th	2 January 2007	Air Commodore	S Abbott	Air Officer RAF Police
29th	5 February 2010	Air Commodore	R W La Forte	
30th	February 2012	Air Commodore	N Bray	
31st	13 May 2013	Air Commodore	A J Hall	Air Officer, RAF Police.
32nd	April 2016	Air Commodore	R F J Clifford	
33rd	May 2019	Air Commodore	S M Miller	
34th	May 2022	Air Vice-Marshal	M J Smeath	Head of British Defence Staff, United States; UK Defence Attaché to the USA; Director, Global Defence Network, UK Ministry of Defence
35th	February 2026	Air Commodore	Paul Tavus Hamilton	
