= Gonalston =

Village and civil parish in Nottinghamshire, England

Coordinates: 53.020°N 0.989°W

- Village and civil parish
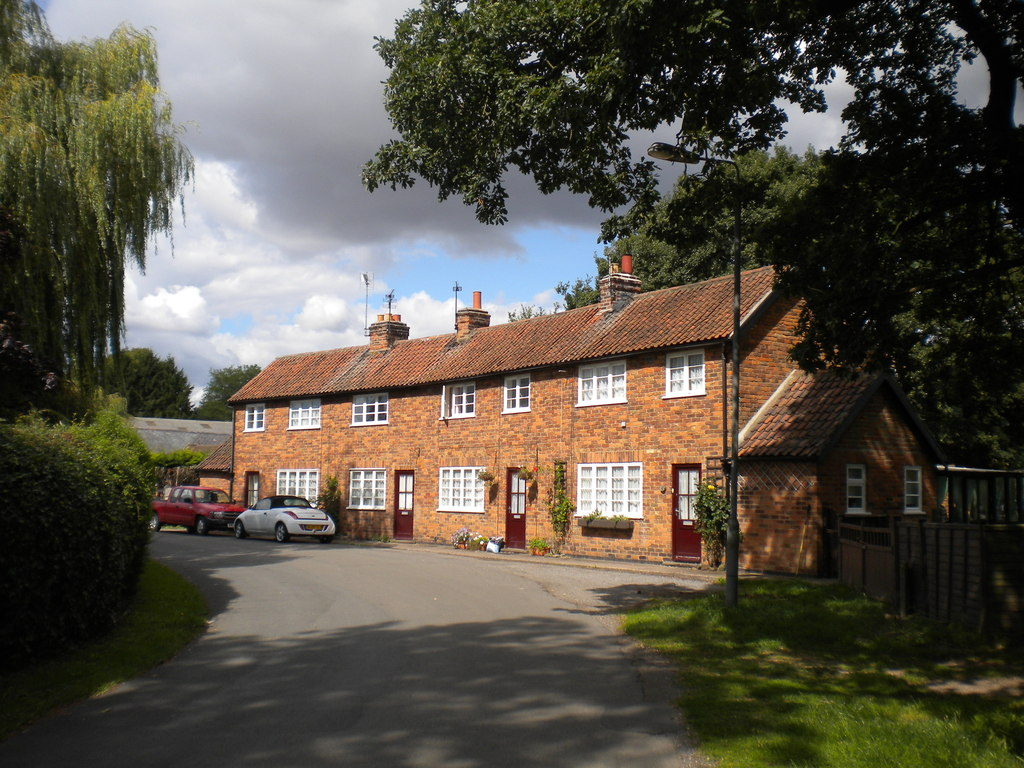
- Gonalston Lane.

- Location within Nottinghamshire
- Interactive map of Gonalston
- Area: 1.71 sq mi (4.4 km^{2})
- Population: 83 (2021)
  - Density: 49/sq mi (19/km^{2})
- OS grid reference: SK 67809 47478
  - London: 110 mi (180 km) SSE
- District: Newark and Sherwood
- Shire county: Nottinghamshire
- Region: East Midlands
- Country: England
- Sovereign state: United Kingdom
- Post town: NOTTINGHAM
- Postcode district: NG14
- Dialling code: 0115
- Police: Nottinghamshire
- Fire: Nottinghamshire
- Ambulance: East Midlands
- UK Parliament: Newark

Gonalston is a small village in Nottinghamshire lying just to the north-east of Lowdham and almost upon the A612 trunk road that runs from Nottingham to Southwell. Gonalston comprises 1,096 acres (4.44 km^{2}; 1.713 sq mi) of arable and pasture land in about equal portions, interspersed with 106 acres (0.43 km^{2}) of wood and plantations. It lies on a small river called the Dover Beck which separates the village from Lowdham and which flows south-east into the River Trent 2 miles (3.2 km) away. Population for the 2021 census was 83 residents.

== Toponymy ==
Gonalston seems to contain the Old Norse personal name, Gunnolf, + tun (Old English), an enclosure; a farmstead; a village; an estate.., so 'Gunnolf's farm/settlement'.

== Historical ==
According to Francis White's Directory of Nottinghamshire of 1853, Gonalston

is a small rural village and parish, near the Dover Beck, 4 miles (6.4 km) south-south-west of Southwell, containing 100 inhabitants and 862 acres (3.49 km^{2}) of land, enclosed in 1768, when 155 acres (0.63 km^{2}) were allotted for the tithes. John Francklin Esq. owns the whole lordship, and is patron of the rectory, which is valued in the King's books at £7 19s 2d, now £324, and is enjoyed by the Rev. Edward Walker Foottit B.A. The church, dedicated to St Lawrence, is a small structure, with a tower and two bells, and was rebuilt in 1852. In Thoroton's time it contained some ancient figures of crusaders, but they were either destroyed or removed at the diminution of the church. They have since been taken up by the present proprietor, under the superintendence of Rd. West Macott Esq. R.A., and are about to be placed in the name of the new edifice.

== Notable buildings ==
The parish church of St Laurence dates from the 14th century. It lies outside the village centre, in the grounds of the rectory, close to the manor house and home farm.

The village was famed in ancient times for its hospital or spital now lost, and its effigies of Crusaders. "William de Heris, in the reign of Henry III, founded an hospital here called the Spital, 'to the honour of St. Mary Magdalene;' the successive rectors of the parish were masters, and formerly preached their induction sermon upon its ruins."

== Archaeology ==
Some recent and important archaeological discoveries have been made in the East Midlands and especially in the silts of the Trent Valley area. This includes finds in Gonalston. At Holme Dyke, Gonalston, Neolithic pottery has been excavated from a ring ditch, and a Late Bronze Age domestic site (as a burnt mound) was uncovered by quarry workings.

== See also ==
- Listed buildings in Gonalston
