= Oxton, Nottinghamshire =

Village in Nottinghamshire, England

Coordinates: 53.056°N 1.062°W

Oxton
- Village and civil parish
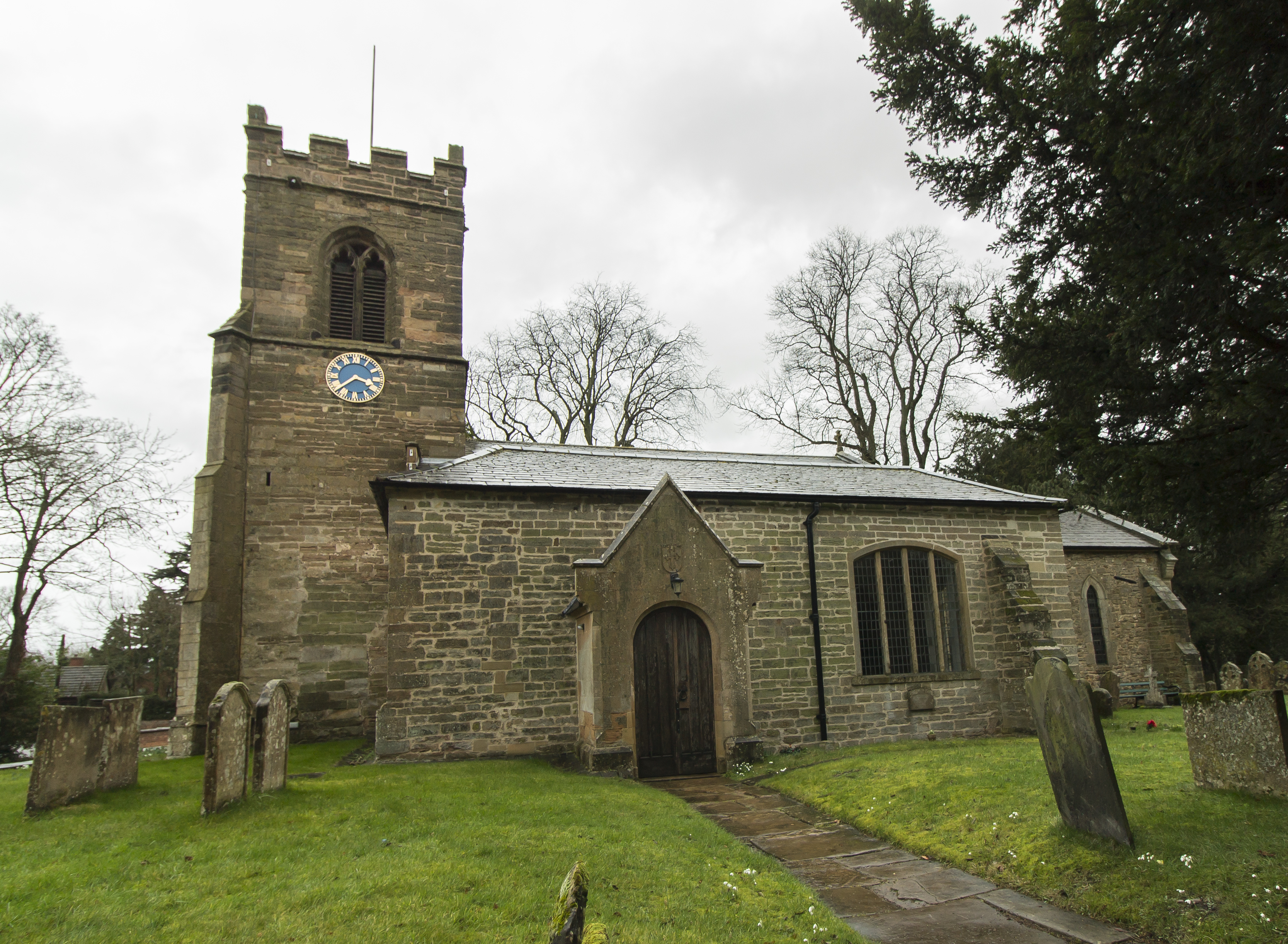
- St Peter & St Paul's Church

- Location within Nottinghamshire
- Interactive map of Oxton
- Area: 5.76 sq mi (14.9 km^{2})
- Population: 566 (2021)
  - Density: 98/sq mi (38/km^{2})
- OS grid reference: SK 62862 51305
  - London: 115 mi (185 km) SSE
- District: Newark and Sherwood
- Shire county: Nottinghamshire
- Region: East Midlands
- Country: England
- Sovereign state: United Kingdom
- Post town: SOUTHWELL
- Postcode district: NG25
- Dialling code: 0115
- Police: Nottinghamshire
- Fire: Nottinghamshire
- Ambulance: East Midlands
- UK Parliament: Sherwood

Oxton is a village in Nottinghamshire, England, with 568 residents at the 2011 census, falling marginally to 566 at the 2021 census. It is located 5 miles (8 km) west of Southwell, 5 miles (8 km) north of Lowdham, 10 miles (16 km) north-east of Nottingham and 2 miles (3 km) north-east of Calverton, and lies on the B6386, and is very close to the A6097 trunk road.

Oxton has a church dedicated to St Peter & St Paul; a post office and two pubs. Oxton also has two fords – a small ford within the village itself, and a much larger ford on Beanford Lane – often as deep as 1-foot (0.30 m) whilst remaining open to all traffic. It is however closed each March, so that the toads found in the swamp-like area, which the ford crosses, can breed.

Oxton is also home to Tithe Green Natural Burial, a natural burial ground located off Old Ruford Road/the A614

== Toponymy ==
Oxton seems to contain the Old English word for an ox, oxa, + tūn (Old English), an enclosure; a farmstead; a village; an estate.., so 'Ox farm or settlement'.

== Notable people ==
- Robert St Vincent Sherbrooke, awarded the Victoria Cross, was born in Oxton.

== Bus services ==
NottsBus

747: Oxton – Calverton – Lowdham

Trentbarton

The Calverton also serves the village at 07:16 every morning Monday to Friday and at 07:21 on Saturdays towards Nottingham, while also making a return journey Monday to Saturday from Nottingham at 17:50.

== See also ==
- Listed buildings in Oxton, Nottinghamshire
