= Chris Mullen =

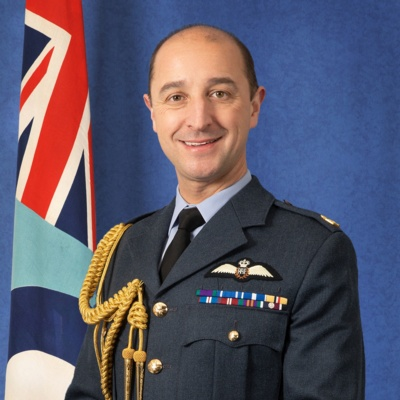
- Chris Mullen
- Military career
- Allegiance: United Kingdom
- Branch: Royal Air Force
- Service years: 1993–present
- Rank: Air vice-marshal
- Commands: RAF Shawbury
- Conflicts: Kosovo War; Bosnian War; Iraq War

Air Vice Marshal Christopher Anthony Mullen is a senior Royal Air Force officer who is British Defence Attaché in Washington, United States.

== RAF career ==
Mullen was commissioned into the Royal Air Force on 28 July 1993. He trained as a helicopter pilot and undertook operational tours in Kosovo, Bosnia and Iraq. Promoted to group captain, he became Chief, Air Operations Coordination Centre at Headquarters Allied Rapid Reaction Corps in August 2016. He went on to become station commander at RAF Shawbury in December 2018. Promoted to air commodore, he became Joint Force Air Component Commander, Headquarters Air Command in February 2022 and Chief of Defence Staff's Liaison Officer to the Chairman of the Joint Chiefs of Staff in May 2023. He was appointed Head of the British Defence Staff and Defence Attaché in Washington, D.C. on 16 January 2026, and promoted to air vice-marshal on the same day.

Military offices
Preceded by Timothy Woods	Head of the British Defence Staff – US and Defence Attaché; 2026–present	Incumbent
