= Bernard Chacksfield =

British RAF air marshal (1913–1999)

Sir Bernard Chacksfield
- Air Vice Marshal Bernard Chacksfield c. 1963
- Born: 13 April 1913; Ilford, Essex
- Died: 27 December 1999 (aged 86); Bourne End, Buckinghamshire
- Military career
- Allegiance: United Kingdom
- Branch: Royal Air Force
- Service years: 1927–68
- Rank: Air Vice-Marshal
- Nickname: Chacks
- Commands: RAF Regiment (1963–68); No. 22 Group (1960–62); RAF Waterbeach (1952–53); No. 910 Wing (1944–45)
- Conflicts: Second World War
- Awards: Knight Commander of the Order of the British Empire; Companion of the Order of the Bath; Mentioned in Despatches (3); Order of the Cloud and Banner with Special Rosette (China)

Air Vice-Marshal Sir Bernard Albert Chacksfield, KBE, CB (13 April 1913 – 27 December 1999) was a senior Royal Air Force officer in the 1950s and 1960s and later a chief commissioner of The Scout Association and chairman of the Burma Star Association.

Chacksfield joined the Royal Air Force in 1927 as an apprentice aircraft engineer at RAF Halton and later at RAF Cranwell. He was selected for flying training and gaining a commission as a Pilot Officer in 1933. He served on the North West Frontier in 1933 as a Westland Wapiti pilot. By 1944 Chacksfield was in command of No. 910 Wing in Burma operating the Republic Thunderbolt fighter-bomber. By the end of the war he had been mentioned in despatches four times. From 1945 he became an air officer and served in the Air Ministry and later with NATO. He served in a number of senior positions until finally becoming Commandant-General of the RAF Regiment in 1963. Chacksfield retired in 1968 as an air vice-marshal.

With a longtime interest in the Scout movement he was appointed in 1970 as chief commissioner for the Scout Association later being awarded the movements highest award, the Silver Wolf in 1975. Chacksfield was awarded the Bronze Wolf, the only distinction of the World Organization of the Scout Movement, awarded by the World Scout Committee for exceptional services to world Scouting.

In retirement he became chairman on the Burma Star Association until his death from cancer in 1999.

Military offices
Preceded by Roy Faville	Air Officer Commanding No. 22 Group; 1960–1962	Succeeded by Albert Case
Preceded by Edouard Grundy	Commandant-General of the RAF Regiment; 1963–1968	Succeeded by Brian Young
