= Richard Roe (cricketer) =

Australian cricketer

Personal information
- Full name: Richard Roe
- Born: 22 January 1913; Geraldton, Western Australia
- Died: 4 May 2008 (aged 95); Auchenflower, Brisbane, Queensland
- Batting: Right-handed
- Role: Batsman

Domestic team information
- Years: Team
- 1934/35: Western Australia

Career statistics
Competition	First-class
Matches	2
Runs scored	136
Batting average	34.00
100s/50s	0/1
Top score	58
Catches/stumpings	1/–
- Source: CricketArchive, 14 July 2011

Richard Roe (22 January 1913 – 4 May 2008) was an Australian cricketer who played two first-class matches for Western Australia in 1935. A right-handed batsman, on debut against New South Wales, he made 35 runs in the first innings, batting at number four, before being run out. He made 29 runs in the second innings. In his second match, also against New South Wales, he made 58 runs in the first innings, his highest score. He also played one match for the Australian Capital Territory in 1940 against Illawarra, although it did not have first-class status. He died in 2008 at the age of 95.
