= Timothy Woods (Royal Navy officer) =

Royal Navy Rear Admiral

Rear Admiral Timothy Woods CBE
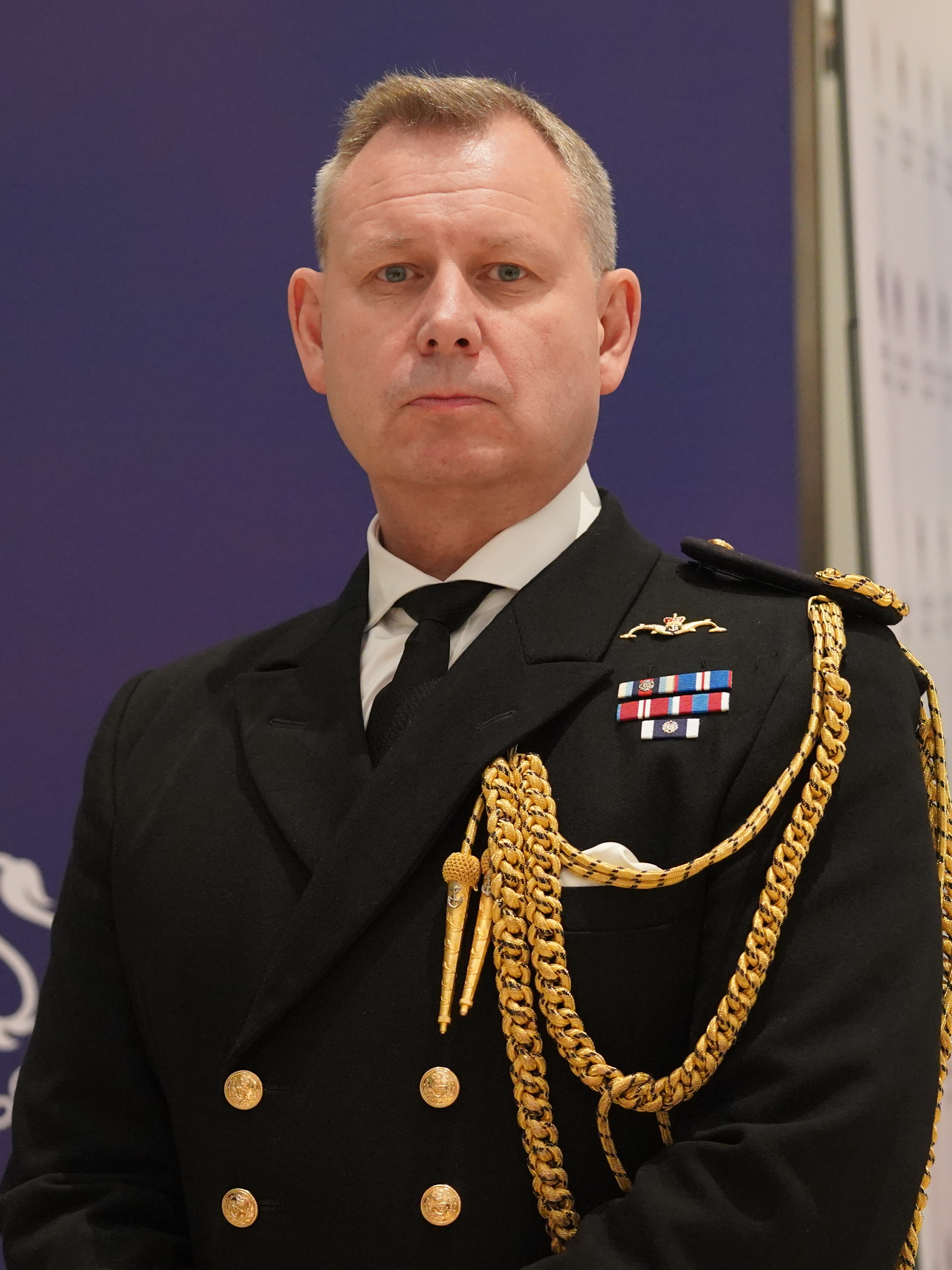
- Rear Admiral Timothy Woods in 2023
- Military career
- Allegiance: United Kingdom
- Branch: Royal Navy
- Service years: 1988–2026
- Rank: Rear Admiral
- Conflicts: War in Afghanistan
- Awards: Commander of the Order of the British Empire

Rear Admiral Timothy Christopher Woods, CBE is a retired senior Royal Navy officer who served as Head of the British Defence Staff and Defence Attaché in Washington, D.C. 2023–2026.

== Naval career ==
After training at the Britannia Royal Naval College, Woods joined the Royal Navy in 1988. Promoted to commodore on 1 May 2015, he served as British Defence attaché in Kyiv. He was promoted to rear admiral on 16 January 2023, and became Head of the British Defence Staff and Defence Attaché in Washington, D.C. the same month. He retired from the Royal Navy on 13 July 2026.

Woods was appointed a Commander of the Order of the British Empire in the 2023 Birthday Honours.

Military offices
Preceded by Michael Smeath	Head of the British Defence Staff – US and Defence Attaché; 2023–2026	Succeeded by Chris Mullen
