= Peter Drissell =

British air force officer

- Born: 24 November 1955 (age 70); Bristol, England
- Military career
- Allegiance: United Kingdom
- Branch: Royal Air Force
- Service years: 1974–2007
- Rank: Air Commodore
- Commands: RAF Regiment (2005–07); Royal Air Force Police (2004–05)

Air Commodore Peter James Drissell (born 24 November 1955) is a retired Royal Air Force officer. He is a former Director of Aviation Security at the Civil Aviation Authority. He previously served as Commandant-General of the RAF Regiment, and as a senior civil servant as Director Security and Business Continuity for the Home Office.

== Early life ==
Drissell was born on 24 November 1955 in Bristol, England. In 1974, he began the study of psychology at City University. He graduated Bachelor of Science (BSc) in 1977.

== Military career ==
On 15 September 1974, Drissell was commissioned into the Royal Air Force Regiment as an acting pilot officer. He was given the service number 5202750. He was regraded to pilot officer on 15 July 1977 with seniority in that rank from 15 October 1975. He was promoted to flying officer on 15 January 1978 and given seniority in that rank from 15 April 1976. He was promoted to flight lieutenant on 15 October 1980. As part of the half-yearly promotions, he was promoted to squadron leader on 1 July 1988. He served as Officer Commanding No. 48 Squadron RAF Regiment from 1989 to 1991.

In 1993, he began the study of War Studies at King's College London. He graduated Master of Arts in 1994. He was promoted to wing commander on 1 July 1994 as part of the half-yearly promotions. Between 1996 and 1997, he was Officer Commanding Operations Wing at RAF Honington. He served as the personal staff officer to the Chief of the Air Staff from 1997 to 1998. He attended the Royal College of Defence Studies in 2003. As part of the half-yearly promotions, he was promoted to air commodore on 1 July 2003.

He was appointed Provost Marshal, the head of the Royal Air Force Police, and Air Officer Security on 27 February 2004. In 2005, he was appointed to the dual-hatted role of Commandant-General of the RAF Regiment and Air Officer RAF Police.

He retired from the Royal Air Force in April 2007 after 32 years service.

== Later life ==
In March 2008, Drissell joined the Home Office as a senior civil servant in the appointment of Director Security and Business Continuity. In December 2012, he took on the role of Head of Security Profession attached to the Cabinet Office in addition to his role in the Home Office. In May 2013, he left the civil service and joined the Civil Aviation Authority as Director of Aviation Security.

In July 2004, he became a non-executive director of the children's charity Plan UK. He had been a trustee of City and Guilds from 2012 until 2014

== Personal life ==
In May 1995, Drissell was shot with seven bullets in an armed mugging as he returned to his house in Wandsworth Road from the Ministry of Defence. He survived the attack but four of the bullets remain in his body and his briefcase was taken.

Military offices
Preceded by Stephen Anderton	Commandant-General of the RAF Regiment; 2005–2007	Succeeded by Steven Abbott
