= Floor (disambiguation) =

A floor is the bottom surface of a room or vehicle.

Floor may also refer to:

== Buildings ==
- Floor (gymnastics), a specially prepared exercise surface
- Floor (legislative), the place where members of a legislature sit and make speeches
- Flooring, a permanent covering of a floor, or the work of installing such
- Storey, a level of a building

== Music ==
- Floor (band), a metal band from Florida
  - Floor (album), an album by the above-mentioned band
- The Floor, also known as The Hitmakers, a Danish rock band
- Floored 1997 album by American rock band Sugar Ray
- "FLOOR", a song by P-MODEL from the album Another Game

== People ==
- Kim Floor (born 1948), Finnish representative in the 1972 Eurovision Song Contest
- Willem Floor (born 1942), Dutch historian, linguist, and writer
- Kabamba Floors (born 1980), a South African rugby union footballer
- Floor Wibaut (1859-1936), Dutch politician
- Floor de Zeeuw (1898–1979), Dutch footballer and football coach
- Floor Jansen (born 1981), a female symphonic metal singer
- Floor Van Der Meulen (born 1989), Dutch film director
- Floor van den Brandt (born 1990), Dutch speed skater
- Floor Spaan (born 2003), Dutch footballer

== Mathematics, science and engineering ==
- Floor function, a mathematical function that gives the greatest integer less than or equal to the input value
- Floor (valley), the bottom of a valley
- Ocean floor, the bottom of the ocean

== Other uses ==
- Floors Castle, Scotland
- Floor exercise, gymnastics routines with no equipment
- Floored (film), a documentary about the Chicago trading floors
- Shop floor in retail or factory premises, where people work with machines or clients
- The Floor (game show), a Dutch game show
  - The Floor (American game show), based on the Dutch game show
  - The Floor (Australian game show), based on the Dutch game show
  - The Floor (Portuguese game show), based on the Dutch game show

== See also ==
- 4th floor (disambiguation)
- Flor (disambiguation)
- Flour (disambiguation)
- Floortje, a given name, including notable people with the name
- Performance surface, flooring for dance or sport
