= FDL =

FDL may refer to:

- Fast Deployment Logistics Ship (FDL), U.S. Navy shipbuilding program of the middle 1960s, eventually cancelled (see USNS Lynn (T-AG-182)).
- Federation of Liberals (Italian: Federazione dei Liberali), an Italian political party
- Federal Depository Library, a library in the Federal Depository Library Program
- File Definition Language - used to describe the structure of a Record Management Services file in the OpenVMS operating system.
- Firebase Dynamic Links, discontinued in 2025, were smart URLs that link to any location within iOS, Android or web apps
- Firedoglake, a defunct political blog
- Fleur-de-lis (disambiguation)
- Flexor digitorum longus muscle
- Florida Democratic League, an American political advocacy group
- Fond du Lac (disambiguation)
- Fossa dei Leoni, an Italian football supporters organisation
- Four Door Lemon, a British video game developer
- Fonds de Dotation du Libre - Libre Endowment Fund (FDL), French fund to support developers and publishers of Free and Open Source software projects
- GE FDL, a series of diesel engines
- GNU Free Documentation License
- United States Air Force Flight Dynamics Laboratory
