= Le Flore =

Le Flore, Leflore or LeFlore may refer to:

== Places in the United States ==
- LeFlore, Mississippi, Grenada County, an unincorporated community
- Leflore County, Mississippi
- LeFlore County, Oklahoma
  - LeFlore, Oklahoma, a town in the county

== Other uses ==
- LeFlore (surname)
- LeFlore Magnet High School, Montgomery, Alabama

== See also ==
- Lafleur (disambiguation)
- LeFleur (disambiguation)
- Flore (disambiguation)
