= Oblation (album) =

Studio album by Floor
- Released: 2014
- Recorded: Spring 2013
- Studios: Atomic Audio, Tampa, Florida
- Genres: Doom metal; sludge metal; stoner rock
- Length: 44:45
- Label: Season of Mist
- Producer: Floor / Mark Nikolich

Floor chronology
Dove (2004)	Oblation (2014)

Oblation is the third studio album by Florida sludge metal band Floor released on April 25, 2014 on the Season of Mist label. The first original material since their previous self-titled album 12 years before, Oblation followed the band's reunion in 2013 after disbanding in 2003. Some critics noted similarities between the album and songs recorded by guitarist Steve Brooks' other band Torche.

== Background ==
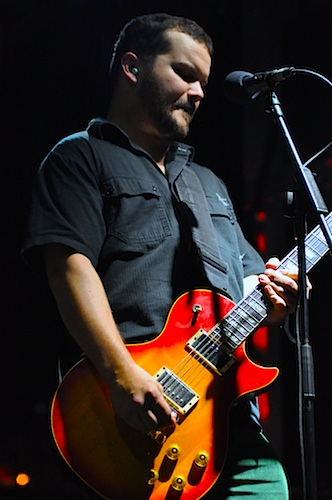
Lead singer and guitarist Steve Brooks

After disbanding in 2003, a box set comprising earlier unreleased material was made available by Robotic Empire Records in 2010. Noticing their increased popularity at live shows promoting the box set, Floor officially reunited in March 2013 and announced their intention to tour and release a new album through Season of Mist. In an interview with Exclaim! in 2014 guitarist Anthony Vialon said that after the group's 2010 reunion tours, Floor had, "noticed that our fan base had grown exponentially and doing a new record, kind of picking up where we'd left off, was something we agreed we should focus on." Vialon and drummer Henry Wilson wrote the bulk of the songs with Brooks contributing after hearing the material later. Brooks said at the time: "I consider it a side project at the moment. If I have the time to focus on new Floor material, it will happen. In the meantime, we play shows from time to time for fun."

== Recording and guitar tuning ==
Recording took place in 2013 at Atomic Audio studios in Tampa, Florida with Mark Nikolich, who also recorded the band's self-titled album in 2001. These tracks were then sent to Kurt Ballou at GodCity studio who did the mixing, and then to Alan Douches who mastered them.

"Bomb Note"
The "Bomb Note" as described by several critics from Love Comes Crushing

The band continued their signature down-tuned guitar sound on the album including extended use of the "bomb string/note", an E string that is so loosely strung to the guitar that, in the words of one critic was described as creating a shuddering explosion of sludgy distortion. Another described it as "A guitar string tuned so low it flaps like a pensioner's bingo wing". The two strings below this are both tuned to a very low A chord with Brooks and Vialon rarely playing the strings below these three. Wilson played bass during the recordings, however during live shows the band did not employ a bass guitar, instead relying on the bass sound created by the two down-tuned guitars.

== Reception ==
Professional ratings
Review scores
Source	Rating
Allmusic	4.5/5 stars
Pitchfork	7/10 stars
Encyclopaedia Metallum	(80%)
Pop Matters	6/10 stars
Consequence of Sound	(B−)
Exclaim!	9/10 stars
Alternative Press	4.0/5 stars
Punknews.org	4.0/5 stars
Louder Than War	9/10 stars

The album was released to generally favorable reviews scoring 77% on aggregate website Metacritic. AllMusic's Gregory Heaney said of the album "Oblation [is] an album one that not only lives up to the band's legacy, but is a meaningful contribution to it". When analyzing the differences between Torche and Floor in his review, Heaney went on to say "Where Torche is more energetic and intricate, Floor is simple and direct, using their signature drone as the focus of the songwriting instead of an accent to it. Floor's real secret weapon, however, is the legendary "bomb note," a shuddering explosion of sludgy distortion that comes from hitting a guitar string that's detuned until it's barely hanging on". Denise Falzon of Exclaim! in a rave review wrote "Oblation is a triumph of doom metal and stoner rock, once again employing unique dropped tunings that make for extremely heavy and intense riffs. Having gained notoriety during their hiatus, Floor cement their welcomed return with Oblation". Giving the album 4 out of 5 stars Alternative Press said in their review "Though the songs are certainly longer than on Floor, Oblation actually harnesses greater energy than its self-titled predecessor. It's also tighter, its melodies more confident and stable than Floor, while buzzing along with their familiar, sludgy foundation, Sleep-y, Sunn O)))-y tone and all. In some ways, sure, it's a more controlled, alternate-universe take on something Torche may have done during their Robotic Empire days, but Oblation's just another great way to feel those fillings rattle."

However Oblation also received mixed reviews from some critics with Dean Brown of Pop Matters stating "there are too many similar and simplistic riffs that run roughshod throughout the album, very few tempo changes outside of mid-pace (For faster tracks see: the all-too-short instrumental "The Key" and the ramshackle punk of "Raised to a Star"), and besides his charming monotone drawl on the post-punk boom of "Forever Still", Brooks stays firmly within his wheelhouse (minus the exultant hooks) to the detriment of the album".

== Track listing ==
No.	Title	Length
1.	"Oblation"	3:10
2.	"Rocinante"	3:21
3.	"Trick Scene"	2:25
4.	"Find Away"	3:10
5.	"The Key"	0:48
6.	"New Man"	3:20
7.	"Sister Sophia"	3:33
8.	"The Quill"	1:50
9.	"Love Comes Crushing"	4:05
10.	"War Party"	2:56
11.	"Homegoings And Transitions"	3:01
12.	"Sign of Aeth"	7:53
13.	"Raised To a Star"	2:13
14.	"Forever Still"	2:59
Total length:		44:45

== Personnel ==
Floor

- Steve Brooks – Guitar & vocals
- Anthony Vialon – Guitar
- Henry Wilson – Drums & bass guitar

Additional musicians and technical personnel

- Melissa Hope Friedman – Additional vocals on Homegoings And Transitions
- Scott Evans – Engineering & recording of guitar solos on Sign of Aeth
- Kurt Ballou – Mixing
- Alan Douches – Mastering
- Francesco Lo Castro – Artwork & album layout

Credits adapted from the liner notes of Oblation

== Charts ==
The album peaked at number 25 on the Billboard Heatseekers Albums chart on May 17, 2014.
