= LeFleur =

leFleur, Le Fleur, Lefleur, may refer to:

== People and characters ==
- Glen LeFleur, drummer for the UK bands Olympic Runners, Arrival (band), Hanson (British band)
- Glenn LeFleur, drummer for the UK band Kokomo (band)
- Lance R. LeFleur, 2010s director of the Alabama Department of Environmental Management
- Louis LeFleur, 18th-century French-Canadian trader who founded French Camp, Mississippi, USA
- Samuel Lefleur, Bahamian athlete who won gold in long jump at the 1993 CARIFTA Games
- Solomon Lefleur, British muay thai martial artist who won a mixed-martial-arts competition in 2021 in ONE Championship

=== Fictional characters ===
- Marie Lefleur, a fictional character from the 1967 film The Christmas Kid
- Max Lefleur, a fictional character from the U.S. TV show Broke (2020 TV series)
- Nathan LeFleur, a fictional character from the 1992 film Storyville (film)
- Rita Lefleur, a fictional character from the sitcom Eve (American TV series)
- Sam LeFleur, a fictional character from the 2006 film Forget About It (film)

== Places ==
- Lefleur's Bluff, Mississippi, USA; the original settlement founded by Louis LeFleur that became Jackson, Mississippi
- LeFleur's Bluff State Park, Pearl River, Jackson, Mississippi, USA

== Other uses ==
- Golf le Fleur (stylized: Le FLEUR), a U.S. designer fashion brand
- LeFleur Rebellion of 1895, South Africa; that occurred near Himeville

== See also ==
- Leflar, a surname
- LeFlore (surname), a surname derived from leFleur
- Le Flore (disambiguation)
- Lafleur (disambiguation) (French: la fleur, lit. 'the flower')
- Fleur (disambiguation)
- Flower (disambiguation) (French: fleur, lit. 'flower')
