= Flore =

Flore may refer to:

== People ==
- Flore (given name) a given name (including a list of people with the name)
- Flore (photographer) (born 1963), French-Spanish photographer
- Jeanne Flore, author, or the pseudonym for a group of authors, of the Contes amoureux, an early 1540s collection of seven tales
- Tristan Flore (born 1995), French table tennis player
- Flore Bois Gaillard, 18th-century St. Lucian revolutionary

== Other uses ==
- French ship Flore, eight French Navy ships
- Flore, Northamptonshire, a village and civil parish
- a title character in the 1796 ballet Flore et Zéphire
- Prix de Flore, a French literary prize established in 1994

== See also ==
- Le Flore (disambiguation), including LeFlore and Leflore
- Flora (disambiguation)
- Flores (disambiguation)
