= Flour (disambiguation) =

Flour is a common food ingredient made from wheat, rice, or other starchy sources.

Flour may also refer to:

- Flour (band), a musical project of Minneapolis musician Pete Conway
- Flour (album), an album by Australian band Screamfeeder
- Rock flour, fine particles of rock formed by glacial erosion or mechanical grinding
- Wood flour, wood pulverized until it is of the consistency of flour
- Flour Lake, a lake in Minnesota
- Flour Bakery, owned by Joanne Chang

== See also ==
- Flower (disambiguation)
- Floor (disambiguation)
- Fleur (disambiguation)
- Fluor (disambiguation)
