= Dance floor =

Dance floor may refer to:

- Sprung floor, a floor to enhance performance and reduce injuries
- Performance surface or marley floor, flooring suitable for dance or sport
- Dance pad, a flat electronic game controller used for input in dance games
- Illuminated dance floor, a floor with flashing illuminated panels
- Portable dance floor, a mobile floor for dancing
- Dance Floor (horse) (foaled 1989), a retired American thoroughbred racehorse

== Music ==
- "Dance Floor" (song), a 1982 single by the funk group Zapp
- Dancefloor Chart, an MTV Europe chart of the ten most popular dance songs in Europe
- "Dancefloor", a song on Kylie Minogue's 2001 album Fever
- "Dance Floor", a song on Jagged Edge's 2003 album Hard
- "Dance Floor", a song on T-Pain's 2005 album Rappa Ternt Sanga
- "Dancefloor" (song), a song on The Holloways's 2006 album So This Is Great Britain?
- "Dance Floor", the first single released from the 2010 album Travellers in Space and Time by The Apples in Stereo

== See also ==
- The Dancing Floor, a 1926 novel by John Buchan
- Eurodance, a dance music style
