= Malnutrition in Nigeria =

Malnutrition in Nigeria, directly or indirectly, is the cause of 45 percent of all death of under-five children. Malnutrition is the cause of stunted growth in over 28 million children in sub-Saharan Africa. Malnutrition is referred to as deficiencies or excesses in nutrient intake, imbalance of essential nutrients, or impaired nutrient utilization. Nigeria, with the biggest economy in Africa is yet to make a breakthrough in the malnutrition problem facing millions of its citizens, especially children. Malnutrition can be in the form of overnutrition and undernutrition. In Nigeria, the situation of malnutrition is very appalling. In the world, Nigeria is the second highest burden of stunted children with a national prevalence rate of 32 percent of children under five. Also, an estimated 2 million children are suffering from severe acute malnutrition (SAM) in Nigeria. The main reason why malnutrition is high in Nigeria is its close association with poverty, with 47 percent of Nigerians (98 million) living in multidimensional poverty.
