= MUAC =

MUAC may refer to:

- Maastricht Upper Area Control Centre, European air traffic control centre
- Museo Universitario Arte Contemporáneo, Mexico City
- Mid-upper arm circumference, an anthropometric measurement
