= Fluor =

Fluor may refer to:

- Fluor, the name in several European languages of the chemical element Fluorine
- Fluor Corporation, multinational engineering and construction firm.
- Fluorite, a class of minerals
- Fluorophore, a fluorescent chemical compound

== See also ==
- Flour (disambiguation)
- Fleur (disambiguation)
