= Lafleur =

Lafleur or LaFleur or la Fleur or variation, may refer to

== People ==
- Abel Lafleur (1875–1953), French sculptor
- Art LaFleur (1943–2021), American actor
- David LaFleur (born 1974), American former National Football League player
- Eric la Fleur (born 1979), Swedish former Olympic swimmer
- Eric LaFleur (born 1964), American attorney and politician
- Greg LaFleur (born 1958), American former National Football League player
- Guy Lafleur (1951–2022), Canadian Hall-of-Fame former National Hockey League player
- Jacques Lafleur (1932–2010), French politician
- Jean Lafleur, Canadian businessman involved in a sponsorship scandal
- Joseph Verbis Lafleur, (1912-1944), Catholic priest and US Army chaplain, cited for heroic action in World War II
- Matt LaFleur (born 1979), American National Football League coach
- Mike LaFleur (born 1987), American National Football League coach
- Pierre-Auguste Lafleur (1872–1954), Canadian politician in Quebec
- Roland Lafleur (1899–1968), Canadian ice hockey player
- Sarah Lafleur (fl. 1995–present), Canadian actress
- Vanessa Caston LaFleur, American politician
- Violette Lafleur (1897–1965), Egyptologist, conservator and curator

== Fictional characters ==
- Ricky LaFleur, in Trailer Park Boys, played by Rob Wells
- James LaFleur, a pseudonym of James "Sawyer" Ford, on the American television show Lost
- Jacques LaFleur, in Harry and the Hendersons, played by David Suchet
- Peter LaFleur, the protagonist of Dodgeball: A True Underdog Story, played by Vince Vaughn

== Other uses ==
- Château Lafleur, a Bordeaux wine producer in Pomerol
- Lafleur (brand), a Canadian cooked meats brand
- Lafleur Restaurants, a Canadian chain of fast food restaurants
- "LaFleur" (Lost), an episode of the television series Lost
- Lafleur (marionette), a French marionette from Amiens
- Lafleur (medication), a medication containing dienogest and estradiol valerate

== See also ==
- The flower (disambiguation) (French: la fleur, lit. 'the flower')
- Leflar, a surname
- Fleur (disambiguation)
- LeFleur (disambiguation)
