= Flowery =

Flowery may refer to:

== Arts and entertainment ==
- Flower (video game), 2009 game known as Flowery in Japanese
- Flowery (Deltarune), character from the video game Deltarune
- "Flowery", 2012 song by ClariS from the album Birthday
- "Flowery", 2011 song by Versailles from the album Holy Grail
- "Flowery", song from the soundtrack of the 2007 anime Heroic Age (TV series)
- Flowery, 1955 writing by Azerbaijani author Ali Valiyev

== Places ==
- Flowery Branch, Georgia, city in Hall County, Georgia, United States
- Flowery Field, area of Hyde, Greater Manchester, England
- Flowery Gully, Tasmania, locality and small rural community in the Western Tamar Valley region of Tasmania, Australia
- Flowery Lake, swamp in the Elko County, Nevada, United States
- Flowery Mound, archaeological site in Tensas Parish, Louisiana, United States
- Flowery Range, mountain range associated with the Virginia Range in Storey County, Nevada, United States

== See also ==
- Flower (disambiguation)
- Flowey, character from the video game Undertale
- Purple prose, overly ornate prose text that may disrupt a narrative flow
