= Democratic League =

Democratic League is a name used by political parties, alliances and organizations in several countries, such as:

- China Democratic League
- Christian Democratic League of Women
- Community Democratic League
- Democratic League (Catalonia)
- Democratic League/Movement for the Labour Party
- Democratic League in Montenegro
- Democratic League of Bosniaks
- Democratic League of Dardania
- Democratic League of Kosovo
- Ethiopian Democratic League
- Ethiopian Somali Democratic League
- Florida Democratic League
- Free-thinking Democratic League
- Finnish People's Democratic League
- Islamic Democratic League
- Kayah Democratic League
- National Democratic League
- Serb Democratic League
- Social Democratic League
- Social Democratic League of America
