= Dance studio =

Place for dance education and practicing

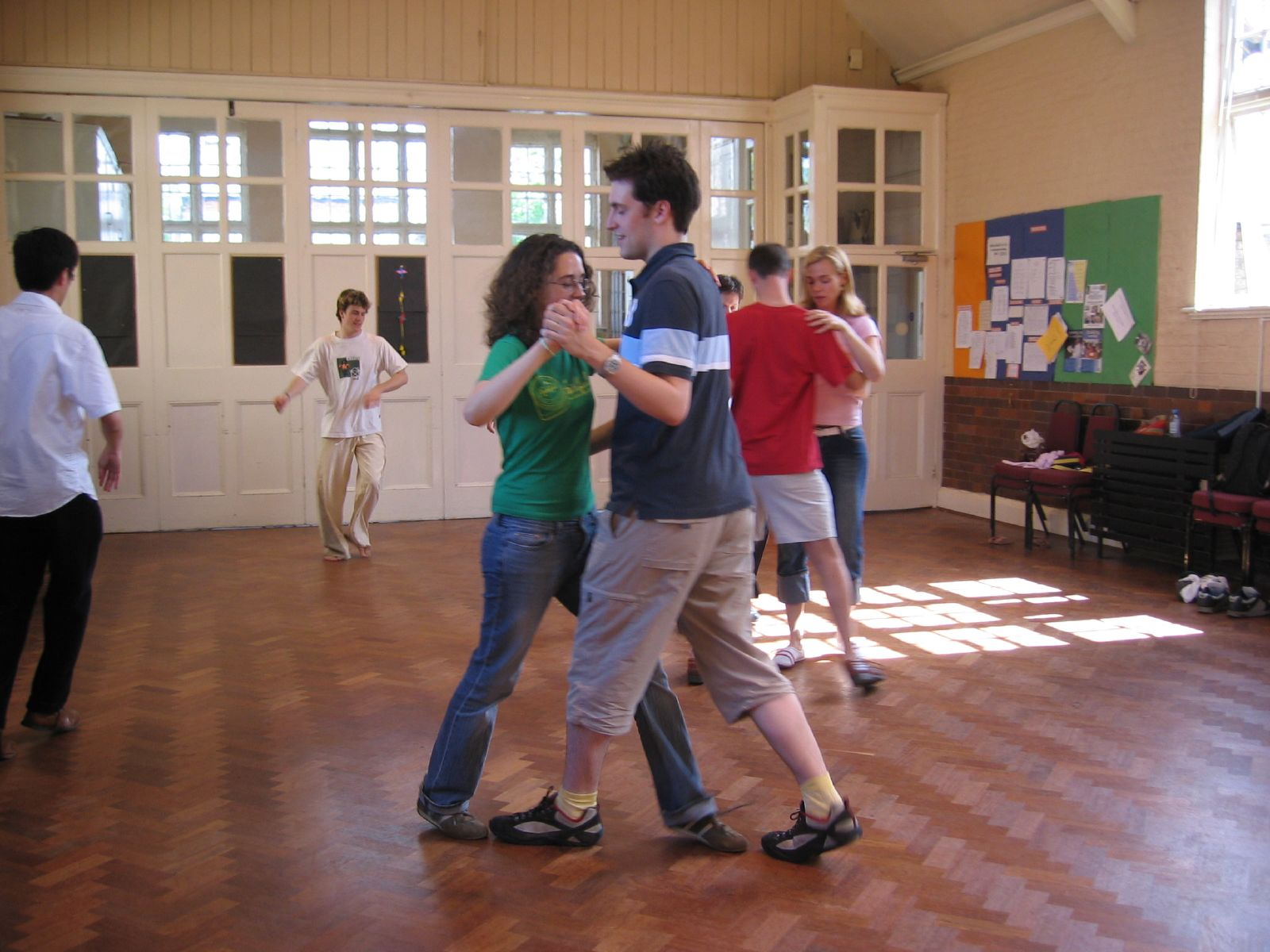
Dancing lesson at College, Cambridge

A dance studio is a space in which dancers learn or rehearse. The term typically refers to the specific room used for dancing, but it may also be used for any particular establishment or building as a whole.

== Overview ==
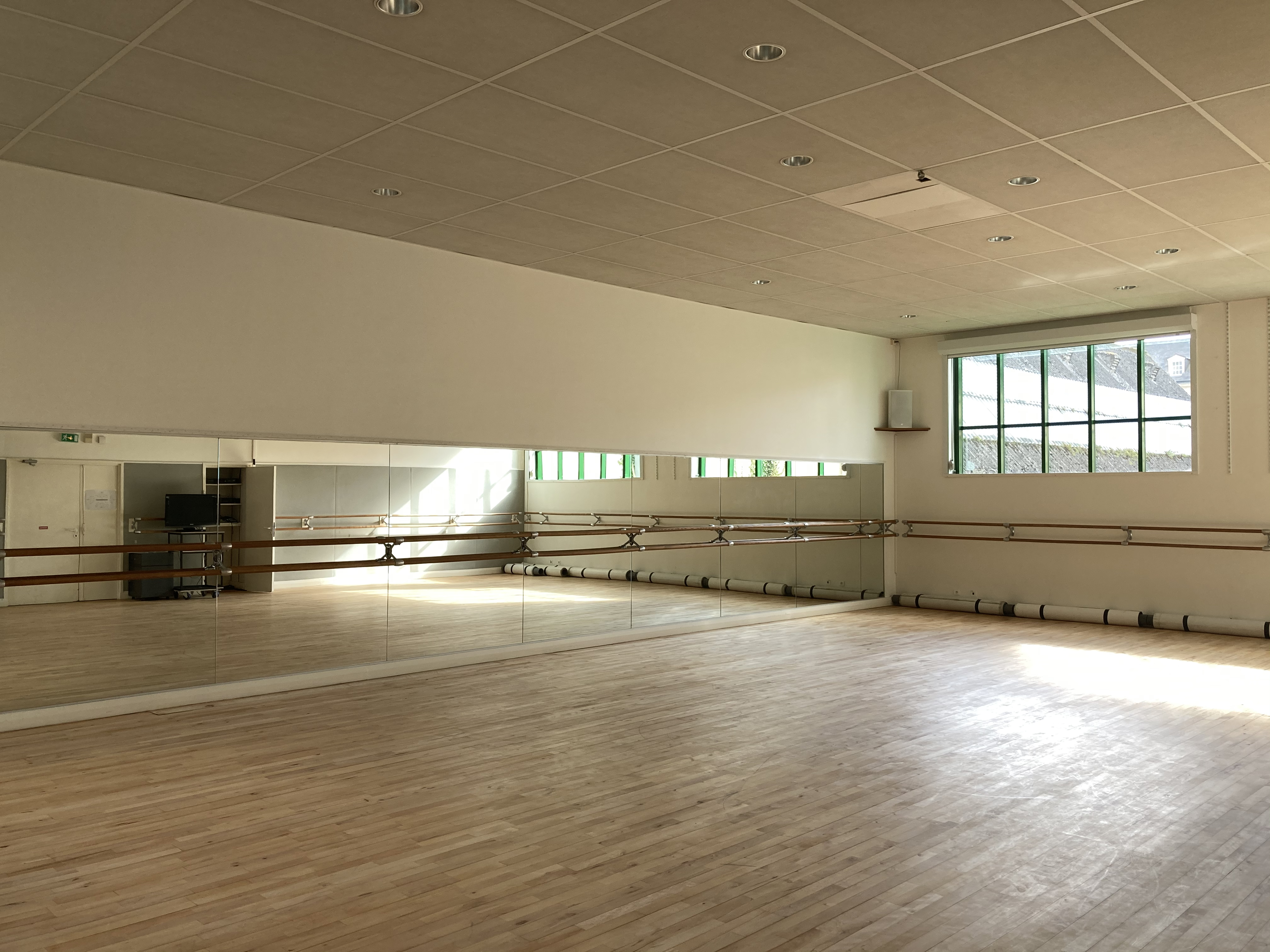
Dance studio with barre rails, mirrors, and mounted speakers

A dance studio normally includes a smooth floor covering or, if used for tap dancing, hardwood flooring. The smooth vinyl floor covering, also known as a performance surface and commonly called "marley", is generally not affixed permanently to the underlying floor and can be rolled up and transported to performance venues if needed.

In many cases, the floor is sprung, meaning the construction of the floor provides a degree of flexibility to absorb the impact of intensive dance exercise, such as jumping. This is considered vital to promote good health and safety.

Other common features of a dance studio are things like a barre, which is used for support and balance during ballet warm-ups. It sits at approximately waist height and is most commonly fixed to the wall, but may also be a standalone movable device. As music is an integral part of dance, nearly all dance studios have a sound system for playing CD's or music via a Bluetooth enabled device; a remote control is essential for the sound system to make it easy for the instructor to repeat musical passages as needed. A piano is still commonly used to accompany ballet and tap dance, especially in professional studios. For various modern dance styles, such as Horton Technique or Graham Technique, drums may also be used for accompaniment. In purpose-built dance studios, it is typical for at least one wall to be covered by floor to ceiling mirrors, which are used by dancers to see their body position and alignment. Other essentials in any dance studio are a table for teacher notebooks and other instructional materials, as well as a large wall clock.

In China, the term dance studio is also used to describe a place established to teach dance. Commonly referred to as dance schools in Europe, they are often based locally and offer classes to interested students who live nearby. Depending on the studio, a variety of dance styles may be offered, or only one.

An early 20th century dance studio
