= 床 =

床 may refer to:

- Ayaka Toko (床 亜矢可; born 1994), Japanese ice hockey player
- Haruka Toko (床 秦留可; born 1997), Japanese ice hockey player
- Toko (architecture) (床) or tokonoma (床の間), recessed space in a Japanese-style reception room

== See also ==
- Bed (disambiguation)
- Bench (disambiguation)
- Floor (disambiguation)
- Sang (disambiguation)
- Toko (disambiguation)
