= Floor (band) =

American metal band

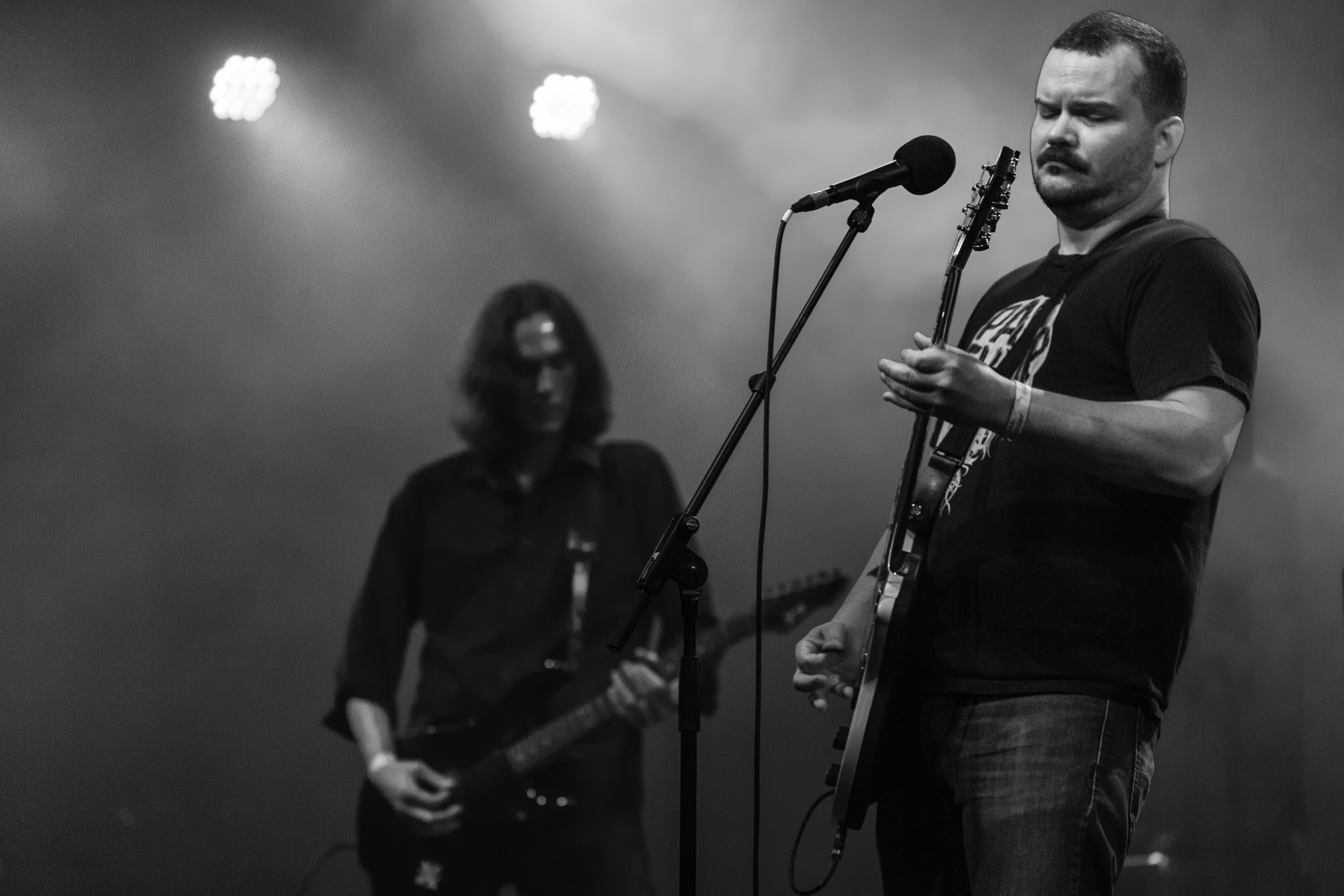
- Floor at Roadburn Festival in 2015

Background information
- Origin: Miami, Florida, U.S.
- Genres: Stoner metal; sludge metal; doom metal
- Years active: 1992–1996; 1997; 2001–2004; 2010–2011; 2013–present
- Labels: Season of Mist; No Idea; Bovine; Rhetoric; Noise Vacuum; Dirge; Robotic Empire
- Members: Steve Brooks; Anthony Vialon; Henry Wilson
- Past members: George Rios; Beatriz Monteavaro; Jeff Sousa; Juan Montoya; Jonathan Nunez

Floor is an American stoner metal/sludge metal band from Miami, Florida, that was formed in 1992 by Steve Brooks, Anthony Vialon and Betty Monteavaro with Brooks and Vialon being the only constant members. The band has released three full-length studio albums to date: Floor, Dove and Oblation and one EP: Madonna.

== History ==
=== Floor and Dove (1992–2013) ===
Initially from Miami, Floor was formed in 1992 by guitarist Steve Brooks, bassist and guitarist Anthony Vialon and drummer George Rios. Betty Monteavaro replaced Rios on drums in 1993 after the first song was written; Rios went on to play in Brethren, Crestfallen and Bird of Ill Omen (with ex-members of Morning Again and Shai Hulud). Jeff Sousa became the drummer in late 1993, when the band had two songs fully written, and Brooks and Vialon changed their sound by implementing two uniquely low-tuned guitars, forgoing the need of a bassist.

Material was then recorded for two full-length albums: Dove in 1994 and Saturnine and Tears in 1995; neither were however released until after their eponymous album, years later. During that time several vinyl-only 7" singles and splits were released, followed by the band's first breakup in 1996.

They reformed with a new lineup for one show in 1997 with Henry Wilson on drums and practiced only occasionally until 2001.

They released their first full-length album, self-titled Floor, before splitting up in 2003. The self-titled album went on to garner accolades from the underground music scene and the bands' cult-following grew in their absence. Brooks would go on to form the band Torche. Henry Wilson went on to form the bands Dove and House of Lightning. Anthony Vialon, having also played several years with Miami outfit Cavity, focused on theology.

The band reformed in 2010 for a reunion tour to support the release of Below & Beyond, an 8-CD/10-LP box set encompassing their entire career.

=== Oblation (2013–present) ===
In March 2013, Floor reunited again and announced its intention to tour and release a new album through Season of Mist. Vialon said that after the group's 2010 reunion tours, Floor had, "noticed that our fan base had grown exponentially and doing a new record, kind of picking up where we'd left off, was something we agreed we should focus on." Floor released their third studio album Oblation on April 29, 2014, to generally favorable reviews scoring 77% on aggregate website Metacritic.

== Musical style ==
The band is known for incorporating two low-tuned and distorted guitars that forgo the need to have a bass guitar. This includes the extended use of what some critics have called the "bomb note", an E-string that is extremely loosely strung to the guitar. AllMusics Gregory Heaney called it "a shuddering explosion of sludgy distortion that comes from hitting a guitar string that's detuned until it's barely hanging on". PopMatters described the effect as "a guitar string tuned so low it flaps like a pensioner's bingo wing" while Grayson Haver Currin of Pitchfork remarked "Who needs a fourth wheel when you've got 12 strings tuned to the introductory letters of the alphabet?".

== Band members ==
Current

- Steve Brooks – guitars, vocals (1992–present)
- Anthony Vialon – guitars, bass, vocals (1992–present)
- Henry Wilson – drums, bass (1997–present)

Former

- George Rios – drums (1992)
- Beatriz Monteavaro – drums (1992–1993)
- Jeff Sousa – drums (1993–1996)

== Discography ==
Studio albums

- Floor (2002, No Idea)
- Dove (2004, recorded in 1994, No Idea)
- Oblation (2014, Season of Mist)

Other releases

- Saturnine And Tears (March 30, 2010, Robotic Empire – recording date unknown)
- Self-Titled + Outtakes (March 30, 2010, Robotic Empire – recording date unknown)
- Riddim Of Silence (March 30, 2010, Robotic Empire – recording date unknown)
- Pillars Of Irem (March 30, 2010, Robotic Empire – recording date unknown)
- It's Not The Same (March 30, 2010, Robotic Empire – recording date unknown)
- F**k You. For Now. (March 30, 2010, Robotic Empire – recording date unknown)
- Oblation (April 21, 2014, Floor – recorded 2014)

Compilation albums

- Below & Beyond (2010, Robotic Empire)

Video albums

- Sight & Seen (2010, Chunklet)

EPs

- Madonna (1994, Bovine)

Singles

- "Loanin'" / "Figbender" (1994, Dirge)
- "Heather" / "When the Pigs Broke Free" (1995, Noise Vacuum)
- "Goddard" / "Slugthrower" (1995, Rhetoric)
- "Homegoings and Transitions" / "Shadowline" (2013, Season of Mist)
- "The Ladder" (2013, Decibel)

Split singles

- Floor / Tired from Now On (1994, No Idea)
- Floor / Spazz (1994, Bovine)
- Floor / Sloth (1995, self-released)
- Floor / Ed Matus' Struggle (1996, Space Cadette)
- Floor / Dove (2001, Berserker)

Compilation appearances

- Loud & Ugly Vol. 2 (contributed song "Iommi") (1995, Bovine)
- No Idea No.12 (contributed song "Who Are You") (1995, No Idea)
- The Good, The Bad & The Ugly (contributed song "Dead Wrong") (1998, Insolito)
