= Fond du Lac (disambiguation) =

Fond du Lac is a city in Wisconsin.

Fond du Lac may also refer to:

== United States ==
=== Wisconsin ===
- Fond du Lac County, Wisconsin
  - Fond du Lac High School
  - University of Wisconsin–Fond du Lac
- Fond du Lac River, a river in the county
- Fond du Lac (town), Wisconsin
- Fond du Lac County Airport
- North Fond du Lac, Wisconsin (village)
- The Fond du Lac Freeway, Wisconsin Highway 145 in Milwaukee

=== Minnesota ===
- Fond du Lac (Duluth), Minnesota, a neighborhood
- Fond du Lac Band of Lake Superior Chippewa, Ojibwe Indian band near Duluth, Minnesota
  - Fond du Lac Indian Reservation

== Canada ==
- Fond du Lac River (Saskatchewan)
- Fond-du-Lac Airport
- Fond-du-Lac, Saskatchewan town and reserve in Saskatchewan

== Rivers ==
- Fond du Lac River (disambiguation)

== See also ==
- Episcopal Diocese of Fond du Lac, Wisconsin
- Fond du Lac County Jane Doe, unidentified homicide victim discovered in Fond du Lac County in 2008
