= Leflar =

Leflar is a surname. Notable people with the surname include:

- Robert A. Leflar (1901–1997), justice of the Arkansas Supreme Court
- Mike Leflar (fl. 2000s–2020s), American basketball coach

== See also ==
- Lafleur (disambiguation)
- LeFleur (disambiguation)
