= Flor (surname) =

Flor is a surname. Notable people with the surname include:

- Cândida Branca Flor (1949–2001), Portuguese entertainer and traditional singer
- Claus Peter Flor (born 1953), German orchestra conductor
- Ellinor Flor (born 1946), Norwegian textile artist
- Harold Henry Flor (1900–1991), American plant pathologist known for rust genetics
- Maria Flor (born 1983), Brazilian actress
- María Teresa Torró Flor (born 1992), Spanish tennis player
- Patricia Flor (born 1961), German diplomat and journalist
- Pierre Flor (1775–1848), Norwegian politician and editor
- Vicente Flor (born 1987), Spanish football goalkeeper
- Vicente Amador Flor (1903–1975), Ecuadorian poet

== See also ==
- Tristan Flore (born 1995), French table tennis player
