= Dove (Floor album) =

Studio album by Floor
- Released: 3 August 2004
- Recorded: 1994
- Studio: Tapeworm Studios, Miami, Florida
- Genre: Doom metal; sludge metal; stoner rock
- Length: 49:44
- Label: No Idea Records

Floor chronology
Floor (2002)	Dove (2004)	Oblation (2014)

Dove is the second studio album by American sludge metal band Floor released in 2004 on the No Idea Records label. The songs on the album were recorded in 1994, before the release of their debut album, Floor in 2002 and were only released ten years later after the positive response the band received to their debut album. As with other Floor compositions the album was recorded without a bass guitar and makes extensive use of heavily down tuned guitars. The album was well received. However, AllMusic reviewer Gregory Heaney commented "In contrast to the band's self-titled effort, Dove certainly isn't essential listening, but for the initiated, it definitely makes for an interesting look back at one of underground metal's most woefully underappreciated bands."

Professional ratings
Review scores
Source	Rating
Allmusic	3.5/5 stars

== Track listing ==
No.	Title	Length
1.	"Who Are You"	1:45
2.	"Namasté"	2:38
3.	"In a Day"	3:42
4.	"Figure It Out"	3:27
5.	"Floyd"	4:13
6.	"Dove"	18:02
7.	"I Remember Nothing"	15:57
Total length:		49:44

== Personnel ==
Floor

- Steve Brooks – guitar and vocals
- Anthony Vialon – guitar
- Jeff Sousa – drums and bass guitar

Technical personnel

- Jeremy du Bois – recording and engineering
- Sean Mahan - cover painting
- Christina Martinez - photography
- Vardcore - graphics
