= Flor (disambiguation) =

Flor is, in winemaking, a film of yeast.

Flor or La Flor may also refer to:

== People ==
- Flor (given name), a list of people with the given name or nickname
- Flor (surname)
- Flor (singer), Argentine pop and rock singer Florencia "Flor" Caserta (born 1984)
- Flor (drag queen), New Zealand drag queen

== Arts and entertainment ==
- La Flor (The Flower), a 2018 Argentine film, the longest in that nation's history
- Flor (band), an American indie band
- "Flor", a 2023 song by Paula Fernandes from 11:11
- Flor, protagonist of the novel Dona Flor and Her Two Husbands, films, plays and a telenovela with the same title
- the title character of Flor Salvaje, an American telenovela

== Other uses ==
- Battle of La Flor, a 1928 battle between US Marines and their Nicaraguan National Guard allies against Sandinista rebels
- La Flor Airport, Costa Rica
- flor., an occasional abbreviation of floruit

== See also ==
- Roger de Flor (1267–1305), Italian military adventurer and condottiere
