= 4th floor =

4th floor may refer to:

- The 4th Floor (1999 film), a 1999 horror film
- The 4th Floor (2003 film) or Planta 4ª, a 2003 comedy film
- Fourth Floor (film), a 2026 Indian Tamil-language psychological horror thriller film
- For the floors of a building, see Storey.
