= Global acute malnutrition =

Measurement of a population's nutritional status

Deaths from protein-energy malnutrition

Global acute malnutrition (GAM) is a measurement of the nutritional status of a population that is often used in protracted refugee situations. Along with the crude mortality rate, it is one of the basic indicators for assessing the severity of a humanitarian crisis.

== Definition ==
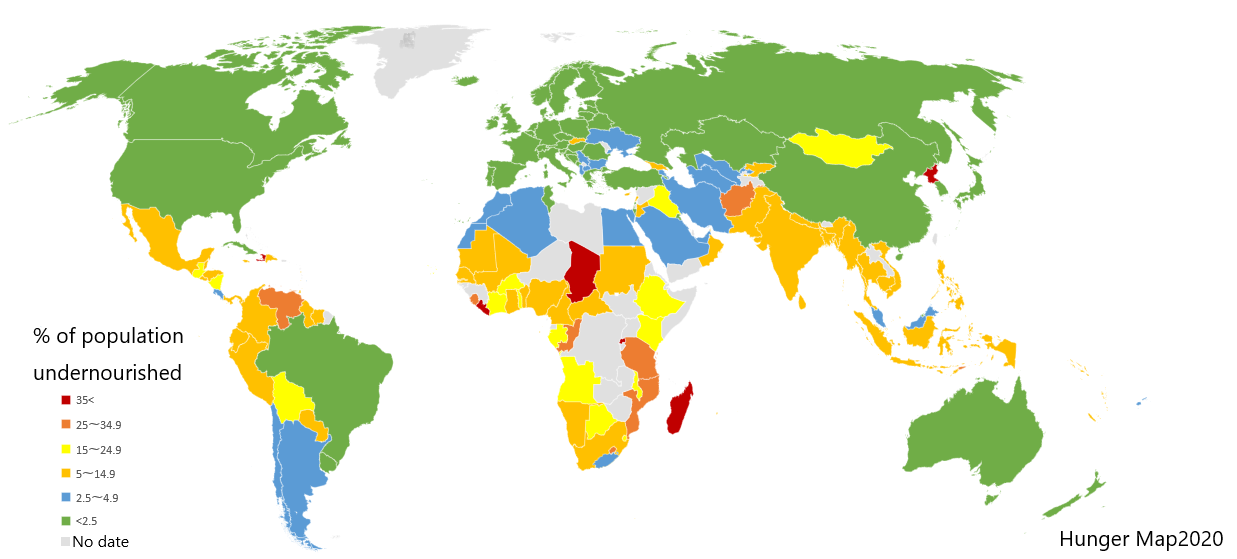
Countries showing percentage of population suffering from undernourishment, 2006

The World Health Organization describes moderate acute malnutrition (MAM) as GAM in the 79–70% range, and severe acute malnutrition (SAM) as GAM below 70%. The World Health Organization also defines other measures of malnutrition including mid-upper arm circumference (MUAC), marasmus and kwashiorkor.

An alternative definition is that a child suffers from GAM if their weight to height ratio is less than the value at −2 standard deviations on the Z-score for the same measurement in the reference population.

SAM is defined as a weight to height ratio less than −3 standard deviations on the Z-score for the reference population. In practice, since the distribution of weight to height ratios is much the same in all populations, the two definitions are equivalent. Weight for height is chosen rather than weight for age since the latter may indicate long-term stunting rather than acute malnutrition.

To evaluate levels of GAM, workers in an emergency measure the weight and height of children between 6 and 59 months. They then use the results as a proxy for the health of the population as a whole. The weight to height index is compared to the same index for a reference population that has no shortage of nutrition. All children with weight less than 80% of the median weight of children with the same height in the reference population, or suffering from oedema, are classified as GAM.

MUAC measurement, if conducted by well-trained staff, can give a quick assessment of new arrivals at a camp. It is based on the observation that this measurement does not change much in children between six months and five years old, so comparison to a "normal" measurement is useful. Based on analysis of field results, MUAC < 125 mm corresponds to MAM, and MUAC < 110 mm with or without oedema corresponds to SAM.

== Interpretation ==
If 10% or more of children are classified as suffering from GAM, there is generally considered to be a serious emergency, and with over 15% the emergency is considered critical.

According to the Integrated Food Security Phase Classification (IPC), a famine is declared if three conditions exist. First, at least 20% of households face extreme food shortages with limited ability to cope. Second, GAM prevalence exceeds 30%. Third, crude death rates exceed two persons per 10,000 per day. In 2011, the conditions in some parts of the Horn of Africa met all three criteria.

== Objectives and results ==
The U.S. State Department has set a target that less than 10% of children under five should suffer from Global Acute Malnutrition in complex humanitarian emergencies. In 2005, this objective was not met in 7% of targeted sites. GAM rates exceeded 10% in eleven camps in Chad, seven camps in Ethiopia, and one camp in the Central African Republic. A study by the UNHCR published in January 2006 found unacceptable GAM levels in UNHCR/WFP supported protracted refugee situations including Chad (up to 18%), Eritrea (18.9%), Ethiopia (up to 19.6%), Kenya (up to 20.6%), Sierra Leone (16%) and South Sudan (16%). The report questioned why GAM rates were so high despite all efforts to bring them down, and why camps in Africa had rates consistently over 15% while camps in Asia were usually below 12% GAM.

== Acute malnutrition and antibiotic resistance ==
Not only being a critical condition, but acute malnutrition can also lead to development of antimicrobial resistance. Since individuals experiencing acute malnutrition are more susceptible to infections, one form of treatment is antibiotics. Studies have however shown that being treated with antibiotics because of acute malnutrition, can lead development of resistant bacteria.

A study in Niger showed that children with severe acute malnutrition were more likely to be colonised by ESBL-E producing bacteria after exposure to amoxicillin compared to children with severe acute malnutrition that had not been exposed to amoxicillin. This study highlights the risk of routine treatment with amoxicillin.
