= Fleur =

Fleur(s) is French for flower(s).

Fleur(s) may refer to:

== Music ==
- Flëur, a Ukrainian band
- Fleurs (Franco Battiato album), 1999
- Fleurs (Former Ghosts album), 2009
- Les Fleurs (album), by Ramsey Lewis, 1983
- Fleurs 2, a 2008 album by Franco Battiato
- Fleurs 3, a 2002 album by Franco Battiato
- "Les Fleurs", a song by Minnie Riperton from the album Come to My Garden, 1970

== Other uses ==
- Fleur (given name)
- "Fleur" (short story), a short story by Louise Erdrich
- FLEUR, a solid-state physics software

== See also ==
- Fleur-de-lis (disambiguation)
- Lafleur (disambiguation) (French: la fleur, lit. 'the flower')
- LeFleur (disambiguation)
- Flower (disambiguation) (French: fleur, lit. 'flower')
