= Younger Hall =

Graduation Hall and lecture theatre in St Andrews, Scotland

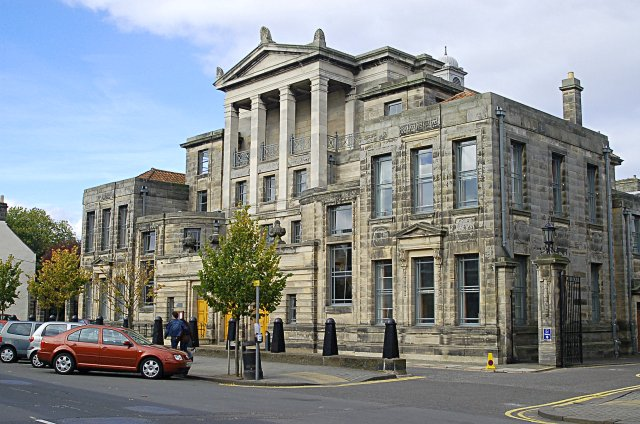
- Interactive map of the Younger Hall area

General information
- Location: North Street, St Andrews, Fife, KY16 9AJ Scotland
- Coordinates: 56.3412414°N 2.7938917°W
- Construction started: 1923
- Completed: 1929
- Cost: £90,000
- Owner: University of St Andrews

Design and construction
- Architect: Paul Waterhouse

Younger Hall is the venue for graduation ceremonies and other large-scale university and some public events in St Andrews, Scotland. Its main hall seats almost 1000 people and is mainly used for lectures and author talks.

== History ==
Younger Hall was designed by English architect Paul Waterhouse as the graduation hall for the University of St Andrews, and built in 1923–29. Its design combines aspects of Neo-Classical and Art Deco styles. It was built at a cost of £90,000 and was opened by Elizabeth, the Duchess of York, later Queen Elizabeth The Queen Mother. The hall was the gift of Dr James and Mrs Annie Younger, who lived nearby at Mount Melville.

Its foyer is decorated with grey and green marble. The principal hall has two levels of balcony and a wood-panelled stage. There is a two-manual organ built by Harrison & Harrison of Durham. Younger Hall was previously the home of The Music Centre of the University of St Andrews, which made use of the eleven practice, teaching and rehearsal rooms and Music Technology Studio which were once located within the building.
