= Flour Lake =

Lake in the state of Minnesota, United States

- Location within Minnesota
- Interactive map of Flour Lake
- Location: Cook County, Minnesota
- Coordinates: 48°3′13″N 90°23′7″W
- Type: Lake
- Basin countries: United States

Flour Lake is a lake in Cook County, Minnesota, in the United States.

Flour Lake was named from the fact government surveyors left a supply of flour there.

== See also ==
- List of lakes in Minnesota
