= Jeanne Flore =

Jeanne Flore was the author, or the pseudonym for a group of authors, of the Contes amoureux, a collection of seven tales published in Lyon in the early 1540s.

Though there is no consensus about the identity of Jeanne Flore, recent research has suggested that Étienne Dolet and Clément Marot may have been among several writers of the tales.
