= Floored (film) =

- Directed by: James Allen Smith
- Written by: Andrew McAllister, James Allen Smith
- Produced by: Joseph Gibbons, Steve Prosniewski, Karol Martesko
- Starring: Bobby Ansani; Jeff Ansani; Ron Beebe
- Cinematography: Chris Baron; James Allen Smith
- Edited by: Andrew McAllister
- Music by: Stefan Nelson
- Release date: September 1, 2009
- Running time: 77 minutes
- Country: United States
- Language: English

Floored is a 2009 documentary film about floor traders of the Chicago futures exchange trading floors, which were becoming obsolete due to electronic trading. Directed by James Allen Smith, the film runs for 77 minutes.

The film was released in September 2009, as economies were recovering from the Great Recession and just before the 2010 flash crash. Ironically, the documentary was widely available on video sharing sites before its official "web premiere" on September 6, 2013.

Critics have suggested a meta-fictional subtext to the documentary, linking the film's storyline about Chicago traders to the plight of independent filmmakers in a time of the declining influence of film festivals and the ubiquitousness of free internet content.

== Synopsis ==
Director James Allen Smith interviews several long-term traders, including many successful traders, to gain an insight into the industry. One trader compared floor trading to hunting for rhinoceros in Africa, saying "It’s not fun unless you can die".

== Reviews ==
The documentary has a 60% rating from 5 reviews on Rotten Tomatoes.

In May 2010, it was reviewed by The New York Times.
