= Flower, West Virginia =

Unincorporated community in West Virginia, United States

- Unincorporated community
- Location within West Virginia Location within the United States
- Coordinates: 38°49′53″N 80°46′23″W
- Country: United States
- State: West Virginia
- County: Braxton
- Elevation: 843 ft (257 m)
- Time zone: UTC-5 (Eastern (EST))
  - Summer (DST): UTC-4 (EDT)
- ZIP code: 26622
- Area codes: 304 & 681
- GNIS feature ID: 1549687

Flower is an unincorporated community in Braxton County, West Virginia, United States. Flower is 6.5 miles (10.5 km) west-southwest of Burnsville.

The community was formerly known as Waldeck.
