= Flowery Lake =

Swamp in Nevada, United States

Coordinates: 40.7291699°N 114.5225853°W

Flowery Lake is a swamp in the Elko County of the U.S. state of Nevada. Flowery Lake was named for the flowers lining its perimeter.
