= Pierre Flor =

Norwegian politician

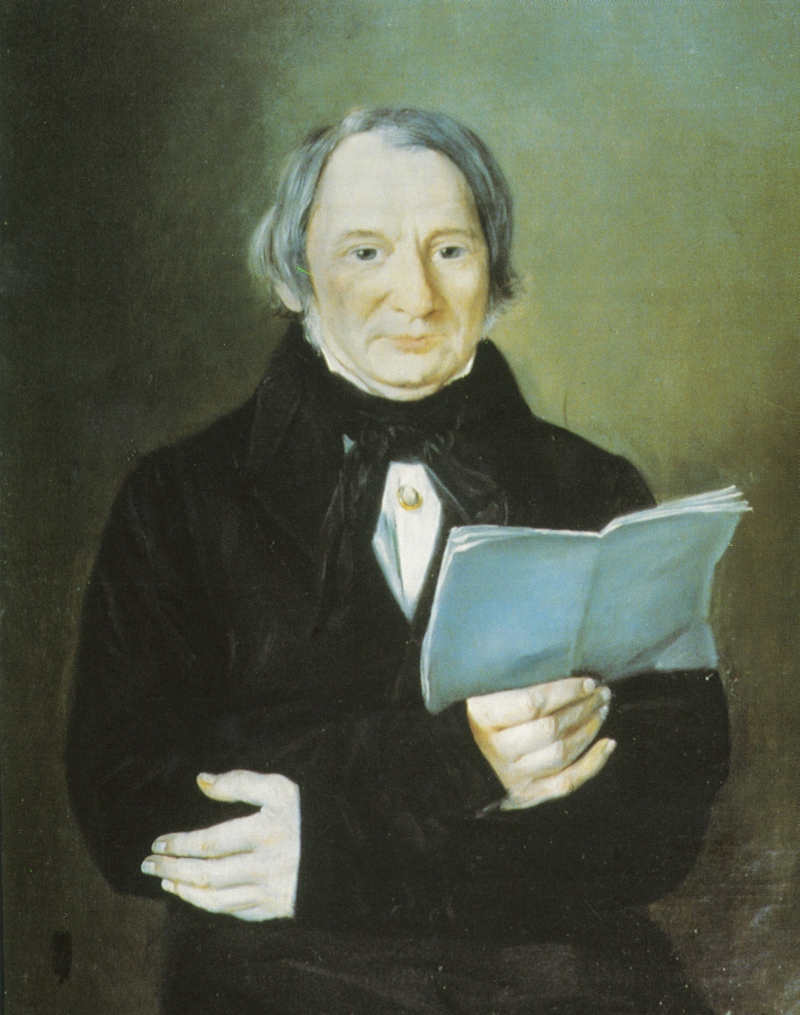
Portrait of Norwegian politician and publicist Pierre Poumeau Flor

Pierre Flor (25 September 1775 – 8 April 1848) was a Norwegian politician, editor and military officer.

Pierre Poumeau Flor was born at the Lilleaker farm in Vestre Aker, Norway. He was the son of General War Commissioner Jens Lorentz Flor (1730-1806) and Maria Bolette Heegård (1752-1787). His father later bought Haugbu farm in Asker in Akershus and settled his family there. Flor completed his legal examination in 1792. He subsequently acted as an assistant to his father as a military auditor. In 1797, he served with the Asker Regiment (Akershusiske infanteriregiments) and in 1799 was a second lieutenant with the Vestre Laurvig Company (Vestre Laurvigske kompani).

From 1806 to 1811, he managed the family farm at Asker. In 1816, he formed the newspaper Drammens Tidende together with Søren Tybring who was vicar of Bragernes Church in Drammen. He served as co-editor until 1817.

Flor was elected a member of Norwegian Parliament from Drammen during the sessions 1818-20, 1821–23 and 1824-26. He served as an alternate representative 1842-44.

Flor translated books by Jeremy Bentham.
