= Flore (photographer) =

French-Spanish photographer (born 1963)

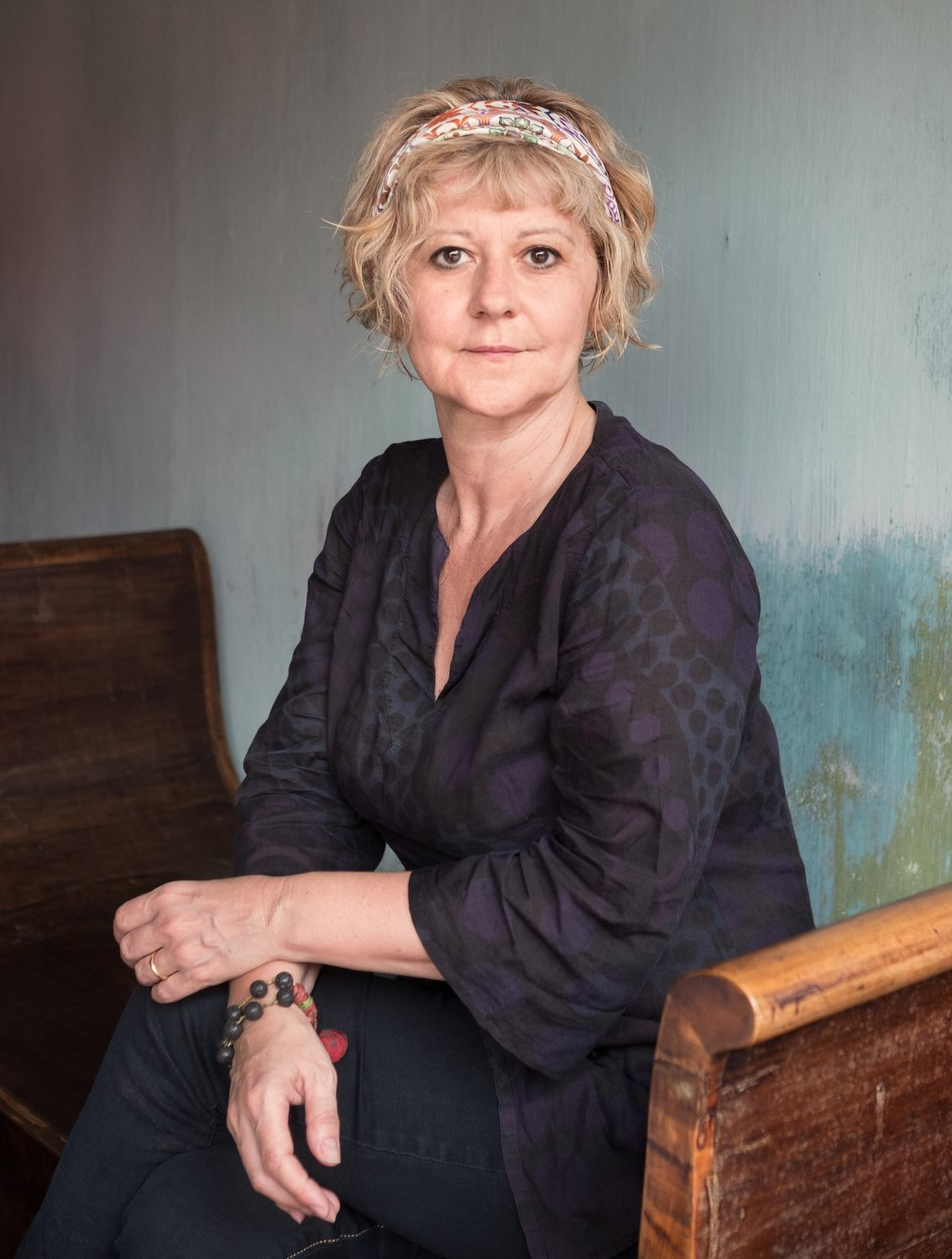
- Born: 23 August 1963 (age 63); France
- Known for: Photography

Flore, stylised as FLORE (born 23 August 1963), is a French-Spanish photographer and daughter of the painter Olga Gimeno.

== Work ==
Flore took up photography in 1977 and after completing her studies in Toulouse, she established herself in Paris where she currently lives and works.

Laureate 2018 of the Prix de Photographie of the Academie des Beaux—Arts - Marc Ladreit de Lacharrière, her work is realized on the long course, often during travels, and are acquired and presented in various notable institutions such as the Petit Palais Museum, the BNF, the MMP + of Marrakesh, the Memorial of Rivesaltes, as well as on the occasion of Art Fair throughout the world.

She uses mainly analog photography and alternative process, sometimes with additions of material like wax, gold or watercolor with particular care for the print.

== Gallery representatives ==
- Galerie Clémentine de la Féronnière – Paris
- Galerie 127 – Marrakesh
- Galeria Blanca Berlin – Madrid
- Galerie Wada-Garou – Tokyo

== Collections ==
- Petit Palais, Musée des Beaux-Arts de la Ville de Paris
- Bibliothèque Nationale de France
- Marrakesh Museum for Photography and Visual Arts
- Mémorial du Camp de Concentration de Rivesaltes
- Galerie du Château d'Eau de Toulouse
- Collection Hubert de Wangen
- Collection Ely-Michel Ruimy
- Privates collections, in Europe, Morocco, the United States and Japan.

== Books ==
- 2009: Je me souviens de vous, Éditions L'Œil de l'Esprit
- 2010: Catalogue épuisé / Une femme française en Orient, Livre+DVD de Adrian Claret-Pérez, Éditions L'Œil de l'Esprit
- 2014: Une femme française en Orient, texte de Natacha Wolinski, Éditions Postcart • ISBN 978-8898391288
- 2016: Lointains souvenirs, écrit de Marguerite Duras & préface de Laure Adler, Éditions Contrejour & Postcart • ISBN 979-1090294240
- 2018: Camp de Rivesaltes, lieu de souffrance, texte de Denis Peschanski, André Frère éditions • ISBN 979-1092265736
- 2019: Maroc, un temps suspendu, Écrits de Anais Nin, Edith wharton, Nedjma, Colette, Nicole de Pontcharra . Préface de Frédéric Miterrand, Éditions Contrejour & Postcart • ISBN 979-1090294387
- 2020 : L'Odeur de la nuit était celle du jasmin, écrit de Marguerite Duras, Maison CF • (ISBN 979-1096575169)
