= Violette Lafleur =

Canadian conservator and curator (1897–1965)

- Born: 1897
- Died: 1965 (aged 67–68)
- Occupations: Conservator and curator

Violette Lafleur (sometimes Violet Lafleur; 1897–1965) was a Canadian conservator and curator for the Department of Egyptology and Petrie Museum of Egyptian Archaeology, University College London.

== Education and career ==
She attended the Grove School in Highgate. She was a Canadian citizen and the daughter of a leading judge in Montreal, where she had been a social worker in the 1920s.

Lafleur entered the Department of Egyptology, University College London (UCL), as a non-degree student. She was close friends with Stephen Glanville, the Edwards Professor of Egyptology at UCL, whose wife Ethel had been at school with her. Lafleur became part of Glanville's new programme of curatorial, cataloguing and conservation work in the Petrie Museum. In 1935, she started to work in the museum as a general assistant and also began conservation training at the British Museum. Soon afterwards, she begin conservation work on the museum objects. She also accompanied Glanville on his 1936 autumn visit to Egypt and attended excavations at El-Amarna and Armant. In 1939, Lafleur became 'Honorary Museum Assistant' and was responsible for photography in the museum, giving six lectures on object conservation.

In 1939, Lafleur examined and restored the remains of Jeremy Bentham, along with his clothes, chair and stick. She was responsible for cleaning and preserving his clothes and padding the skeleton so that he could be displayed in the Cloisters of the Wilkins Building at UCL.

On the outbreak of the Second World War, Lafleur managed the removal of the Petrie Museum collections to Stanstead Bury, near Ware in Hertfordshire. She had only the assistance of the college porters and occasional help from former students for this task. After the UCL campus had been hit by bombs in September 1940 and early 1941, she oversaw a continuous salvage programme for the remaining objects and carried out conservation work in the physiology laboratories. Lafleur packed up the remainder of the collections and sent them to safety during the war, effectively rescuing the museum. She had lost her own flat and most of her belongings during the Blitz in 1940.

Lafleur continued preserving the collection when it returned to UCL after the end of the war and continued teaching there until 1954. Rosalind Janssen dedicated her book The First Hundred Years: Egyptology at University College London 1892-1992 to the memory of Violette Lafleur as there was no record of her work in the Petrie Museum.

== Recognition ==
Lafleur's dedication and work for the museum was recognised in 1951 by Sir David Pye, the Provost, at a Fellows' Dinner where a wish was recorded for a permanent record to her in the Petrie Museum, although no such record was ever made.

A new exhibition at the Petrie Museum, Characters and Collections, opened summer 2015, now recognizes Lafleur's key role in the survival of the collection.

== Bibliography ==
- David Collings (2000), "Bentham's auto-icon: Utilitarianism and the evisceration of the common body", Prose Studies: History, Theory, Criticism, 23:3, 95–127.
- Rosalind M. Janssen (1992), The First Hundred Years. Egyptology at University College London 1892-1992, London: University College London.
- H. S. Smith (1988), "The reopening of the Petrie Museum of Egyptian Archaeology", The EES Newsletter No. 3, October 1988, 3–4.
- Stevenson, A. (2015), The Petrie Museum of Egyptian Archaeology: Characters and Collections, London: UCL Press.
