= Fond du Lac River =

Fond du Lac River may refer to:

- Fond du Lac River (Saskatchewan), northwestern Canada
- Fond du Lac River (Wisconsin), United States
