= Floor (gymnastics) =

Artistic gymnastics apparatus

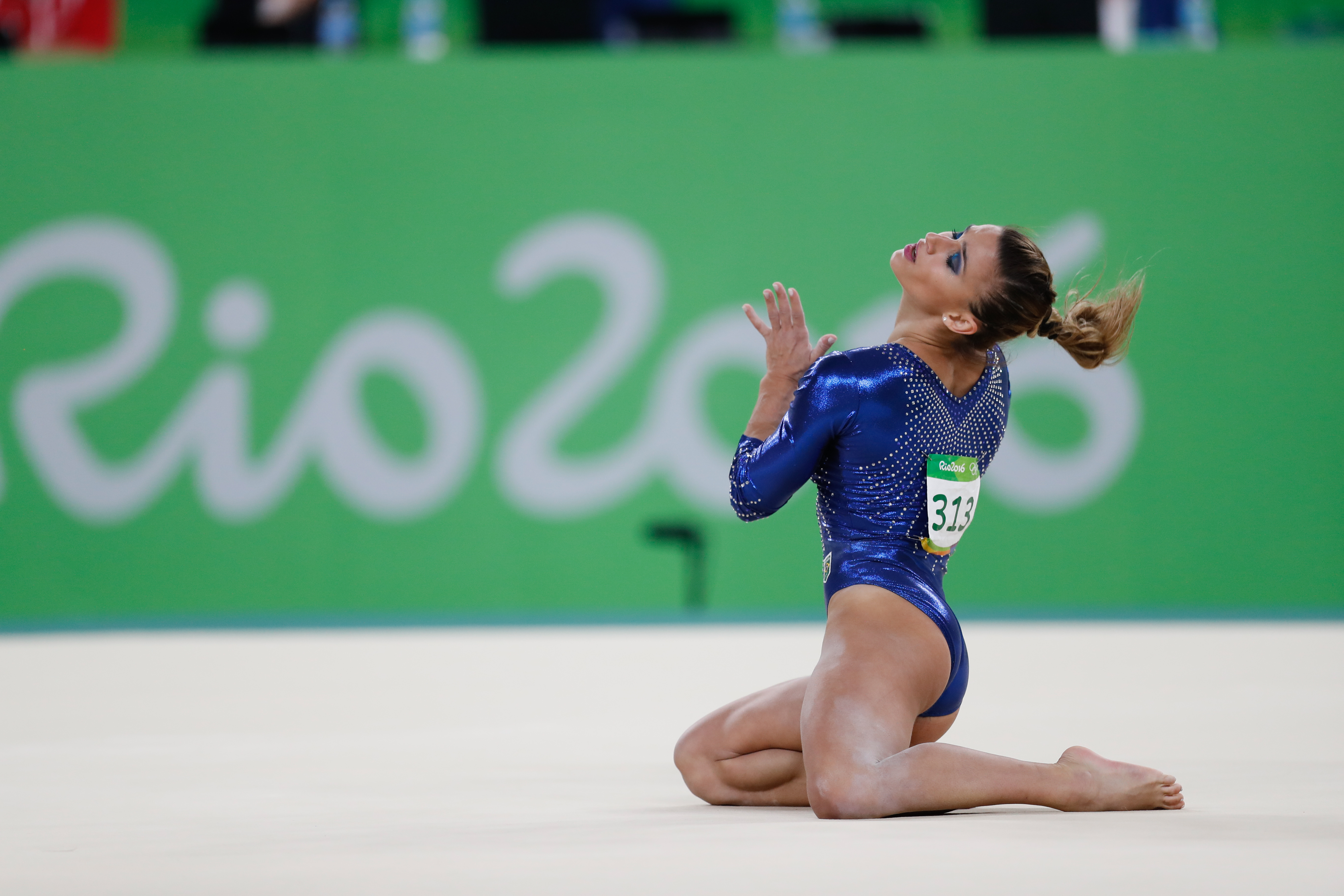
Jade Barbosa performing on floor at the 2016 Summer Olympics

In gymnastics, the floor is a specially prepared exercise surface, considered an apparatus. The floor exercise (English abbreviation FX) is the event performed on the floor, in both women's and men's artistic gymnastics (WAG and MAG). The same floor is used for WAG FX and MAG FX, but rules and scoring differ; most obviously, a WAG FX routine is synchronised to a piece of recorded dance music, whereas MAG FX has no musical accompaniment.

A spring floor is used in all gymnastics to provide more bounce and help prevent potential injuries to gymnasts' lower extremity joints due to the nature of the apparatus, which includes the repeated pounding required to train it. Cheerleading also uses spring floors for practice. The sprung floor used for indoor athletics is designed to reduce bounce.

== The apparatus ==
The apparatus originated as a 'free exercise' for men, very similar to the floor exercise of today. Most competitive gymnastics floors are spring floors. They contain springs and/or a rubber foam and plywood combination, which make the floor bouncy, soften the impact of landings, and enable the gymnast to gain height when tumbling. Floors have designated perimeters called the delimitation strip, indicating an out of bounds area.

=== Dimensions ===
Measurements of the apparatus are published by the Fédération Internationale de Gymnastique (FIG) in the Apparatus Norms brochure. The dimensions are the same for male and female competitors.

Artistic Gymnastics, Acrobatic Gymnastics

- Performance area: 1,200 centimetres (39 ft) x 1,200 centimetres (39 ft) ± 3 centimetres (1.2 in)
- Diagonals: 1,697 centimetres (55.68 ft) ±5 centimetres (2.0 in)
- Border: 100 centimetres (3.3 ft)

Rhythmic Gymnastics

- Performance area: 1,300 centimetres (43 ft) x 1,300 centimetres (43 ft) ± 3 centimetres (1.2 in)
- Diagonals: 1,838 centimetres (60.30 ft) ±5 centimetres (2.0 in)
- Border: 50 centimetres (1.6 ft)

== WAG scoring and rules ==
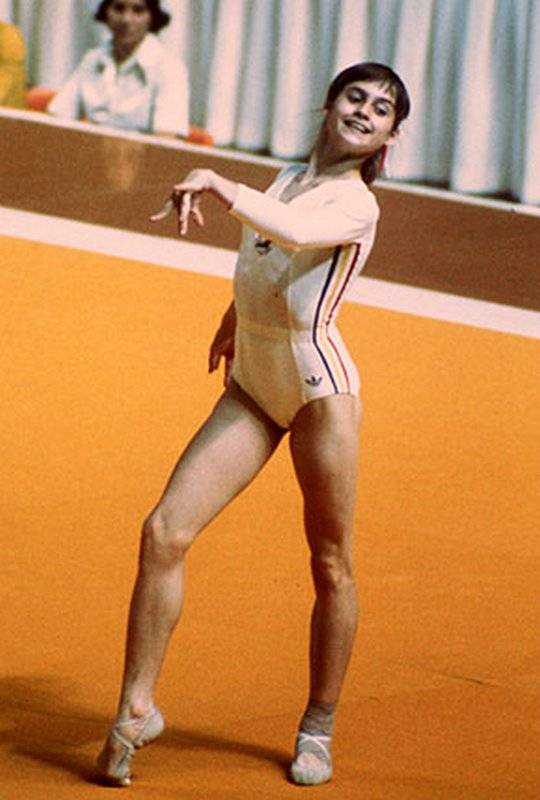
Nadia Comăneci on floor at the 1976 Summer Olympics

Floor exercise routines last up to 90 seconds, and there is one timekeeper for this event. The routine is choreographed in advance, and is composed of acrobatic and dance elements. Above all others, this event allows the gymnast to express their personality through their dance and musical style. The moves that are choreographed in the routine must be precise, in sync with the music, and entertaining.

At the international elite level of competition, the composition of the routine is decided by the gymnast and their coaches. Many gymnasiums and national federations hire special choreographers to design routines for their gymnasts. Well-known gymnastics choreographers include Adriana Pop (Romania, France, China), Dominic Zito (United States), and Geza Pozar (Romania, United States). Others opt to choreograph their FX routines in-house. Some gymnasts adopt a new FX yearly; others keep the same routine for several competitive seasons. It is not uncommon for coaches to modify a routine's composition between meets, especially if it is used for an extended length of time. It is uncommon for gymnasts to use multiple FX routines in the same season. However, it is not entirely unheard of; for instance, at the 1996 Summer Olympics in Atlanta, Russian Dina Kotchetkova's routine in the FX event finals had completely different music, choreography and composition than that of her all-around exercise.

The music used for the routine is also the choice of the gymnast and their coaches. It may be of any known musical style and played with any instrument(s), but it may not include spoken words or sung lyrics. Vocalization is allowed if the voice is purely done as an instrument. It is usually the responsibility of the coach to bring the music to every competition.

Scores are based on difficulty, artistry, demonstration of required elements, and overall performance quality. The score is divided into two pieces, D-score and E-score, which are added together to get the overall score. D-score is a bonus added on to the overall score for the difficulty level of the routine. The D-score is calculated by adding values for the eight most difficult skills, connections, and compositional requirements.

D-score Difficulty Values
Difficulty	Value
A	0.1
B	0.2
C	0.3
D	0.4
E	0.5
F	0.6
G	0.7
H	0.8
I	0.9
J	1.0

The E-score is based on execution and begins at a value of up to 10.0; deductions are taken for poor form and execution, lack of required elements, and falls. The gymnast is expected to use the entire floor area for their routine and to tumble from one corner of the mat to the other. Steps outside the designated perimeters of the floor incur deductions. The gymnast will also incur a deduction if there are lyrics in the music.

=== International level routines ===
For detailed information on score tabulation, please see the Code of Points article

Routines can include up to four tumbling lines and several dance elements, turns, and leaps. A floor routine must consist of at least:

- Connection of two dance elements (one must be a 180 degree split)
- Saltos forward/sideways and backward
- Double saltos
- Saltos with a minimum of one full twist

== MAG scoring and rules ==
Men's floor exercise routines are no longer than 70 seconds, and there is one timekeeper for this event. A loud beep will be sounded to alert gymnasts when they have 10 seconds left within the allocated time to finish their routine before receiving a penalty for exceeding the legal time allowed. Routines are typically made up of acrobatic elements combined with other elements that display the gymnast's strength and flexibility while using the entire floor area.

As with Women's Artistic Gymnastics, scores are based on difficulty, form, and overall performance quality, with the overall score being the addition of the D-score and the E-score. Deductions are taken for lack of flexibility, not using the whole floor area, and pausing before tumbling lines.

=== International level routines ===
A floor routine should contain at least one element from all element groups:

- I. Non-acrobatic elements
- II. Acrobatic elements forward
- III. Acrobatic elements backward, & Arabian elements

The dismount can come from any element group other than group I. Those competing as seniors must include a double salto in their routines.

== Floor exercises in rhythmic gymnastics ==
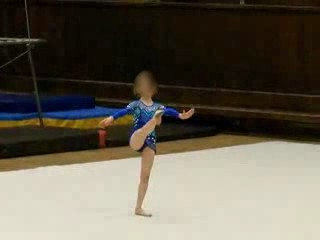
Young rhythmic gymnast in floor exercises

Floor exercises are also in rhythmic gymnastics for the youngest gymnasts, up to 10 years old, who perform their routines freehand, which means without any apparatus (contrary to the remaining five - rope, hoop, ball, clubs and ribbon). Their length and content are still clearly specified and differ in each age category.

== See also ==
- Acro dance, which incorporates many FX elements in a dance context.
- Gym floor cover
- Performance surface
- Sprung floor
- Wushu (sport), which also uses a floor.
- Acrobatic gymnastics
