= Flower (disambiguation) =

A flower is a reproductive structure found in many plants.

Flower, The Flower or Flowers may also refer to:

== People ==
- Flower (name), a surname and given name
- Flowers (name), a surname
- Marc-André Fleury (born 1984), Canadian ice hockey goaltender nicknamed "Flower"
- Guy Lafleur (1951–2022), Canadian retired ice hockey player nicknamed "the Flower"
- Cheryl Saban (born 1951), American former recording artist using the stage name "Flower"

== Arts, entertainment, and media ==
=== Fictional characters ===
- Flower (Meerkat Manor), a meerkat in the television series Meerkat Manor
- Flower (Bambi), in the movie Bambi
- Ramona Flowers, an American expatriate from the graphic novels Scott Pilgrim
- Flower, a character from Battle for Dream Island, an animated web series
- Susan "Flower" Montero, in the CBS series Ghosts

=== TV series ===
- Flowers (TV series), a British black comedy drama

=== Films ===
- Flower (film), a 2017 American film
- Flowers (2014 film), a Spanish film
- Flower Films, an American production company

=== Music ===
==== Groups ====
- Flower (American band), an American indie rock band
- Flower (Japanese group), a Japanese pop girl group
- Flower (South Korean band), a South Korean rock band
- The Flowers (Chinese band), a Chinese rock band
- The Flowers (Scottish band), a Scottish post-punk band
- Yuya Uchida and the Flowers, a Japanese rock band
- Icehouse (band) or Flowers, an Australian rock band

==== Albums and EPs ====
- Flowers (Ace of Base album), 1998
- Flower (Akira Jimbo album), 1997
- Flowers (Casiopea album), 1996
- Flowers (Durand Jones & The Indications album), 2025
- Flowers (Echo & the Bunnymen album), 2001
- Flower (EP), a 2013 EP by Yong Jun-hyung
- Flowers (The Emotions album), 1976
- Flowers (Joan of Arc album), 2009
- Flower (Jody Watley album), 1998
- Flower (XIA album), 2015
- Flowers (Jennifer Paige album), 2003
- Flowers (Pacific Avenue album), 2023
- Flowers (The Rolling Stones album), 1967

==== Songs ====
- "Flower" (Gackt song), 2009
- "Flower" (GFriend song), 2019
- "Flower" (Jisoo song), 2023
- "Flower" (Koda Kumi song), 2005
- "Flower" (L'Arc-en-Ciel song), 1996
- "Flower" (Atsuko Maeda song), 2011
- "Flower" (Kylie Minogue song), 2012
- "Flower" (Soundgarden song), 1989
- "Flower" (Tomiko Van song), 2006
- "Flower" (Sonic Youth song), 1985
- "Flower", a song by Liz Phair from her 1993 album Exile in Guyville
- "Flower", a song by Moby from his 2000 compilation album Play: The B Sides
- "Flower", a song by Eels from their 1996 album Beautiful Freak
- "Flower", a song by Relient K from their 2016 album Air for Free
- "Flower", a song by Jaguar Wright from her 2005 album Divorcing Neo 2 Marry Soul
- "A Flower", a 1950 song by John Cage
- "Flowers" (Billy Yates song), 1997
- "Flowers" (Lauren Spencer-Smith song), 2022
- "Flowers" (Miley Cyrus song), 2023
- "Flowers" (Oliver Tree song), 2026
- "Flowers" (Sweet Female Attitude song), 2000
- "Flowers", a song by Aespa from the 2024 EP Whiplash
- "Flowers", a song by Alle Farben, 2025
- "Flowers", a song by Danny Brown from the 2025 album Stardust
- "Flowers", a song by Émilie Simon from the 2003 album Émilie Simon
- "Flowers", a song by Gabi DeMartino from the 2018 EP Individual
- "Flowers", a song by Kanye West from his 2022 album Donda 2
- "Flowers", a song by Marina from her 2021 album Ancient Dreams in a Modern Land
- "Flowers", a song by The New Radicals from their 1998 album Maybe You've Been Brainwashed Too
- "Flowers", a song by The Psychedelic Furs from their 1980 album The Psychedelic Furs

==== Recording studios ====
- Flowers Studio, a recording studio in Minneapolis

=== Video games ===
- Flower (video game), a 2009 game for the PlayStation 3
- Flowers (video game series)
- Flower power-ups, in the Mario franchise
- Flower, a kingdom in Super Mario Bros. Wonder

=== Other uses in arts, entertainment, and media ===
- Flowers (TV channel), a Kochi-based Malayalam television channel
- Flowers (magazine), a Japanese manga magazine published by Shogakukan
- Flowers (TV series), a 2016 British black comedy TV series
- "The Flower" (The Amazing World of Gumball), a television episode
- V Flower, a Vocaloid voice bank
- The Flower, a novel by John Light and Lisa Evans, shortlisted for the 2008 Hampshire Illustrated Book Award

== Navy classes ==
- Flower-class sloop, a First World War Royal Navy class
- Flower-class corvette, a Second World War Royal Navy class, also used by other Allied navies

== Other uses ==
- Communities in the United States:
  - Flower, West Virginia
  - Flowers, Mississippi
  - Flowers, North Carolina
- Flowers Foods, an American bakery company
- GWR 4100 Class, a class of British steam locomotives
- Flower Avenue, an alternative name for the Polish Soldier Square in Szczecin, Poland

== See also ==
- National Federation Party - Flower faction, a faction in the Fijian general election of September 1977
- Flower Flower, a Japanese band headed by singer-songwriter Yui
- Flour, a food powder
- FLWOR, a type of expression in the XQuery programming language
- Fleur (disambiguation) (French: flower)
- Flour (disambiguation)
- Flowery (disambiguation)
