= Floor (album) =

Studio album by Floor
- Released: 2002
- Recorded: 2001
- Studio: Atomic Audio, Tampa, Florida
- Genre: Doom metal; sludge metal; stoner rock
- Length: 32:31
- Label: No Idea Records

Floor chronology
| Floor (2002) | Dove (2004) |

Floor is the debut studio album by American sludge metal band Floor released in 2002 on the No Idea Records label. After recording EPs and demos over an approximate ten-year period in an attempt to capture the doom-pop sound they have become known for, the bands use of providing the biggest possible sound with minimal guitar work finally paid off. Giving it a positive rating, AllMusic's Gregory Heaney said of the album "...though the riffs here feel, at times, Sunn O)))-like, the thunderous drums help the whole package feel propulsive rather than ponderous."

In May 2013, Floor was inducted into Decibel Magazine’s Hall of Fame.

Professional ratings
Review scores
| Source | Rating |
|---|---|
| Allmusic | 4.5/5 stars |
| Encyclopaedia Metallum | (82%) |

== Track listing ==
| No. | Title | Length |
|---|---|---|
| 1. | "Scimitar" | 2:28 |
| 2. | "Return to Zero" | 2:20 |
| 3. | "Downed Star" | 2:45 |
| 4. | "Iron Girl" | 2:18 |
| 5. | "Night Full of Kicks" | 3:32 |
| 6. | "Twink" | 0:53 |
| 7. | "Sneech" | 1:02 |
| 8. | "Assassin" | 1:52 |
| 9. | "Kallisti - Song for Eris" | 3:08 |
| 10. | "Ein (Below and Beyond)" | 3:24 |
| 11. | "Figured Out" | 3:19 |
| 12. | "Tales of Lolita" | 2:02 |
| 13. | "\/ Song" | 3:28 |
| Total length: | | 32:31 |

== Personnel ==
Floor

- Steve Brooks – guitar and vocals
- Anthony Vialon – guitar
- Henry Wilson – drums and bass guitar

Additional musicians and technical personnel

- Ken Karg, Lisa Bugayong – additional vocals
- Mark Nikolich – recording and engineering
- Sean Mahan – artwork
- Sean Deren - photography
- Var Thelin - graphics
