= Performance surface =

Type of flooring

A performance surface is a type of flooring with attributes suitable for dance or sport. The word performance in this context will refer to any means of displaying physical movement. This includes theatrical, athletic, and recreational forms of performance. However, these different disciplines all require specialized floors to accommodate their specific physicality. Performance surfaces are normally designed as a sprung floor with additional material or layers on top, to create a complete dance floor or sports floor. Dance performance surfaces are denoted by using a layer of Marley, a popular type of vinyl, on top of a sprung floor. Theatres often have a number of roll-out floors with different characteristics to satisfy the requirements of different forms of dance. In addition, athletic flooring has been found to require different and new technological mechanisms to enhance performance. Flooring for spaces like clubs or ballrooms also serves a different purpose and therefore utilizes different properties.

This article deals with the customization of a floor for different activities by the use of different surfaces. The basic requirements for floors and what makes them good, like shock absorbance and slip resistance, are discussed, before examining what makes each specific floor unique.

== Quality performance surface ==
Generally, a wood surface is standard for many indoor sports. Engineered wood is normally used because it is less liable to warp or shrink and is more economical. You would find this most commonly used for public events, e.g. a gym hall used for a graduation ceremony or a club dance floor. A step above a wooden surface is the sprung floor. A sprung floor absorbs shock and can enhance performance and greatly reduce injuries. This is more common in athletic spaces This is among the many key factors that can influence the quality of a performance surface. A general list of these includes:

- Shock absorption: The amount of an impact that is absorbed by the floor, which reduces the load absorbed by the body and joints (Usually measured in %)
- Vertical deformation: The average distance the floor deforms under impact (Usually measured in mm)
- Area deflection: The amount of energy put into the floor that is appropriately absorbed and dispersed
- Traction/Slip resistance: The level of grip the surface has (Measurements vary depending on standards)

=== Traction ===
In general, dance requires less traction than a gym, but these floors must be the perfect balance between sticky and slippery. However, these types of floors should also be fairly smooth, so as to not cause friction burn. This can make it difficult to stop them from becoming slippery when wet. To maintain good traction, it is important to enforce a good floor cleaning regime and recommend sports or dance shoe utilization. If a floor is occasionally used for public events, e.g. a gym hall used for a graduation ceremony, then a floor cover can be used to protect the floor and ease the normal requirements. The main protection though ensuring the hall has industrial-grade barrier matting at the entrance. The building should also have a floor grate at the entrance.

Most of the differences between the different disciplines can and should be catered for by the use of appropriate shoes. On the same surface, a dance shoe with a leather or suede sole will give much less traction than a gym shoe with a composite rubber sole. A sticky floor used for the gym is very likely to cause twisted ankles, and a slippery floor used for dancing is liable to cause bad falls.

Footwear nowadays tends to have a higher traction. For occasions like weddings, where the dancers may not have proper footwear, a slightly slippier floor could compensate somewhat, but a highly polished floor can be very dangerous with leather soles. Both gyms and dance clubs are better off providing good safe floors and encouraging the use of proper footwear.

== Performance surface construction ==
=== Dance flooring ===
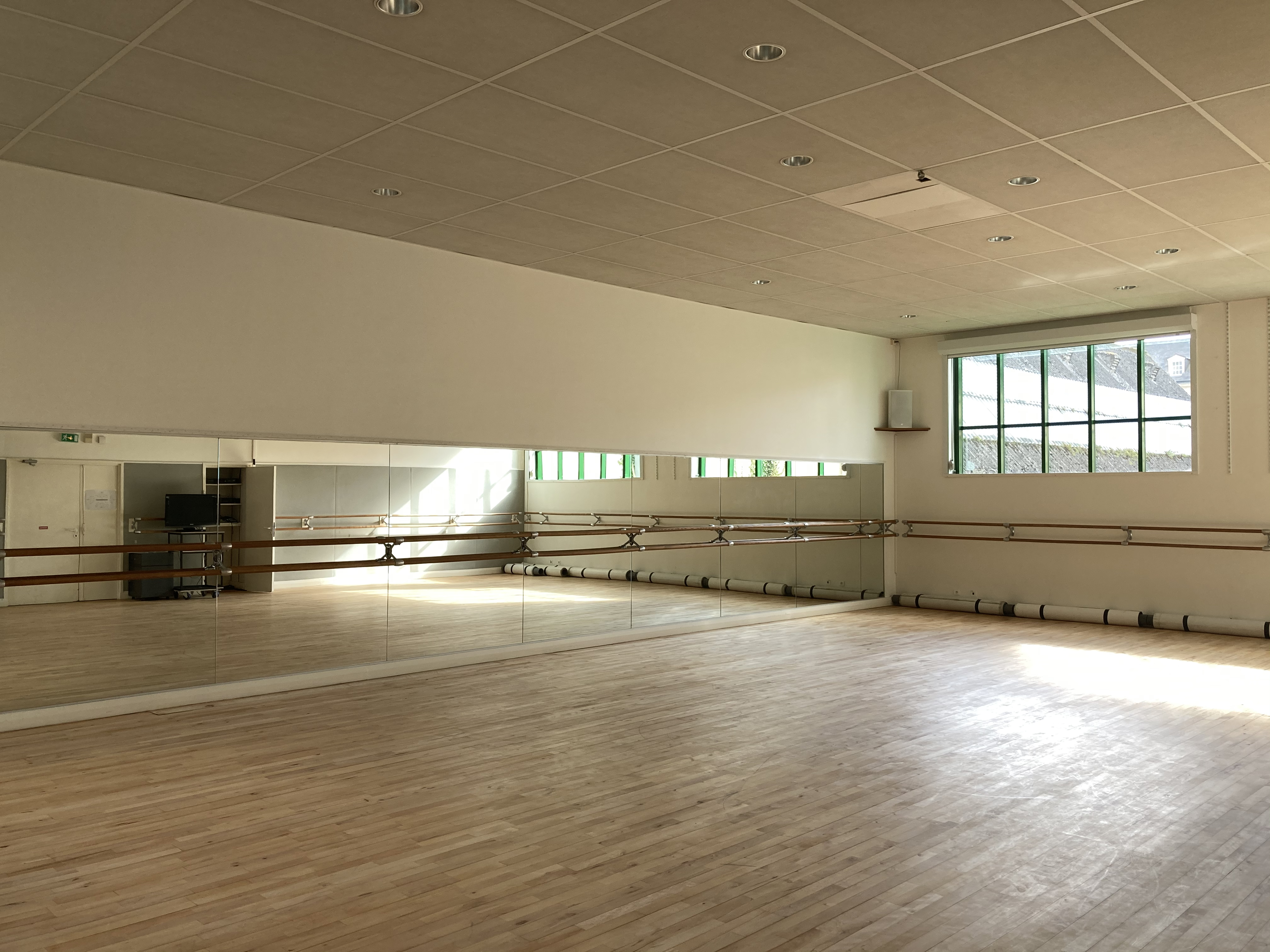
Hardwood flooring in a dance studio

The performance surface of professional dance facilities normally consists of a base hardwood, engineered wood, or laminate. Dancers perform at high levels of physicality that require significant intervention to protect their bodies and enhance performance. The flooring they dance upon must exhibit all of the key factors stated above: shock absorption, vertical deformation, area deflection, and slip resistance. These are regularly achieved through the use of suspended flooring or the sprung floor. For professional dance, vinyl sheeting is commonly placed on top and may be removable or replaceable. Roll-up vinyl sheeting, or Marley flooring, normally consists of:

- A thin top wear layer that also has UV light protection. Ultraviolet light rapidly degrades vinyl. This layer has to provide the proper traction and tends to be matte rather than shiny as for domestic vinyl.
- A layer of vinyl which supports the wear layer. This also provides the main color.
- A woven fiber interlayer. This stops the floor from deforming and also provides some area elasticity.
- A bottom layer of foamed vinyl which provides the softness.

*When stored the vinyl should not be bent sharply - it should be on rolls. When there are a number of different surfaces for a hall these can be kept on special storage carts which keep them separate rather than lying on each other.*

Vinyl is a better choice for various types of dance or more general community use. There are different requirements for each type of dance, but the differences can mostly be accommodated for by changes in the dance surface. For instance, Riverdance, like tap dance, requires a harder surface, like hardwood, that makes a sound. Ballet requires a softer surface because of the high jumps and the possibility of falls. Ballroom dancing requires less traction than Scottish country dancing.

==== Injury rates ====
Several studies exist pertaining to the medical significance of proper training surfaces for professional dancers. The quality of a dance floor has been attributed as a factor in injury incidences by both research and the dancers themselves. It is emphasized that a quality dance floor must consist of adequate visible surfacing as well as sprung flooring, and the absence of one cannot be compensated for by the existing part. 291 of 2,281 reported injuries spanning 17 years were attributed to faulty flooring by professional and student dancers. Lower limb injuries are the most common, accompanied by complaints regarding traction issues, with the floor either being too slippery or having too much friction. Shock absorption qualities are also important to consider a surface being too firm can cause the body to absorb large amounts of energy during landings, which equates to lower limb stress and injury risks.

Much of the issue with dance flooring is the inconsistencies across facilities. In many instances, preference must give way to the necessity of dancing on whatever surface is installed in a given school, studio, or theater. Therefore, not only studios but also stages should be equipped with proper dance floors in order to prevent injuries among performers.

=== Athletic/Sports flooring ===
In general, sports flooring is designed for player safety and with performance enhancement in mind. Different sports have different requirements for the surface they play and practice on. This has led to the creation of a variety of engineered surfaces. The following is a list of commonly used flooring within sports facilities.

- Polyurethane: These are the most durable floors with maximum slip and wear resistance. The cushioned element of a polyurethane floor, with its 2mm surface finely tuned with a softer underlayer, distinguishes it from other flooring options, making it a top choice for athletes and facility managers seeking both performance and comfort.
- Rubber-crumb: EPDM rubber crumb flooring (polymetric surfaces) is regularly used for outdoor basketball courts, children's playgrounds, and multi-use game areas. Rubber flooring is used to protect a substrate (e.g. concrete) from heavy shock.
- Timber: Timber is the traditional material for sports hall flooring. Damping layers, shock pads, and anchoring techniques determine this flooring's level of performance. It delivers incredible bound and friction reduction, but the timber must be resurfaced every ten years with new lacquer.
- Vinyl: Vinyl is the cheapest option for sports hall flooring, offering good all-around performance and durability. Although the top surface is more susceptible to abrasion damage, vinyl is a good option where specific elastic performance is wanted, as it can be manufactured to enhance this.

==== Other technology ====
Discussion of nanotechnology has also entered the athletic sphere. The use of nanomaterials, in clothing, textiles, equipment, and sports flooring, is becoming more and more common within athletics. This technology, in the form of SiO_{2}, TiO_{2}, Al_{2}O_{3}, CaCO_{3}, and similar particles, has numerous property-enhancing abilities when combined with fibers or substrates. In relation to sports flooring, the addition of nanomaterials has been reported to have strong water and oil-proof properties. Specific nanoparticles dispersed throughout polyurethane fibers intensify the stretch and heat resistance of sports turfs. When nanoparticles are incorporated into running tracks, these turfs show outstanding rebound resilience, elastic recovery, and durability, as well as anti-flaming/mildew/static properties. Despite its many positive aspects on performance enhancement, nanomaterials possibly have a negative impact on the environment and organisms, threatening human health.

==== Implications ====
It is suggested that there is a much more significant relationship between athlete performance and the type of floor they interact with. Recent research has inferred that the floors with the greatest shock absorption properties will reduce a person's vertical jump height and force production. It was concluded that any type of cushioning, either from the floor or a person's shoe, decreases a person's vertical jump height, and therefore their ability to create vertical force. This has led to hypotheses that wonder if other aspects of athletic performance are also altered by different types of flooring.
