= Florida Democratic League =

The Florida Democratic League (FDL) is one of the state's minority-led civil rights, equality, and social justice advocacy organizations. The FDL reports having over 68,000 members and supporters. It is Hispanic founded and run.

== Structure ==
The Florida Democratic League is a State of Florida-chartered non-profit political organization focusing on advancing human rights, civil liberties, and social welfare of all Floridians, especially ethnic and racial minorities, through lobbying federal, state and local officials for support of equality, human and civil rights and social justice legislation, and mobilizing grassroots action among its members.

Local activities are carried out by local steering committees, of which there are 6 located throughout the State of Florida.

=== Leadership ===
The Florida Democratic League's leadership includes President Manuel Rodriguez; Chairman, Dr. Eladio Jose Armesto; Vice President, Rev. Julio E. Perez; Vice President, Nathaniel Wilcox; Secretary, Miriam Gonzalez; Treasurer, Jordanis Padron. FDL’s work is supported by two boards: the Board of Directors, which is the governing body for the organization and the Board of Advisors, which advises the organization on its statewide outreach. Both boards are composed of volunteer members from across the state.

== History ==
Bernardo Arago, Fidel Iglesias, Rene Valdez, Mariela Valdez, Jose "Pepe" Vera, Martha Vera and Eladio Jose Armesto founded the Democratic League of Dade County (DLDC) in 1991 to unite and organize the county’s Hispanic Democrats. In 1992, the League endorsed and actively campaigned for presidential candidate Bill Clinton. In January 1993, the DLDC organized the Miami Bill Clinton Inaugural Party. In March 1993, FDL launched a Florida Voter Registration project.

In October 2006, the FDL was incorporated in the State of Florida as a non-profit political organization.

As part of its commitment to true marriage equality, i.e., affording everyone the same, equal right to marry under the same, equal terms and conditions, the FDL joined with other organizations in filing an Amicus Brief in the anti-Voter Rights, anti-Democracy, anti-Constitution lawsuit of Catherine Pareto, et al., vs. Harvey Ruvin, filed in Miami-Dade County Circuit Court on January 21, 2014. The FDL argued that Florida’s Constitution already afforded everyone full Marriage Equality.

"Florida’s Constitution already prohibits discrimination and guarantees all Floridians true Marriage Equality, based on the same, equal right to marry another person under the same, equal terms and conditions. When exercising this right, no one’s alleged sexual behavioral choices are ever considered. Indeed, no one is asked their alleged sexual behavioral choices or preferences when applying for a Marriage license in the Sunshine State. The reason is clear: Florida’s Constitution and laws do not ban or prohibit anyone from marrying as husband and wife provided they are of age, unmarried, and not blood related."

== Awards ==
The Florida Democratic League maintains a number of awards for individuals distinguished for their social justice and civil liberties-related work. In addition to League awards, local chapters also award their own versions of the awards. These awards are typically presented at an annual dinner gala.
