= Fleur-de-lis (disambiguation) =

The Fleur-de-lis is a stylized design often used in heraldry or as a political symbol.

Fleur de Lys or Fleur de Lis may also refer to:

== Places ==
- Fleur-de-Lis Trail in Nova Scotia
- Fleur-de-Lys, Malta, part of the locality of Birkirkara
- Fleur-de-lis, Caerphilly, a village near Blackwood, Wales
  - Fleur De Lys RFC, a rugby union team
- Fleur de Lys, Newfoundland and Labrador, Canada
- Fleur de Lys (Los Angeles, California), a mansion
- Fleur de Lis Hotel, Canterbury, Kent, England

== Fictional characters ==
- Fleur de Lys (superhero), a character from Quebec created by Mark Shainblum
- Fleur-de-Lis (DC Comics), a superhero character from France in the Global Guardians
- Fleur-de-Lys de Gondelaurier, a character in the 1831 novel The Hunchback of Notre-Dame by Victor Hugo
- "Dogmatika Fleurdelis, the Knighted", a card and character in the Yu-Gi-Oh! Trading Card Game

== Other ==
- The original stage name of the Filipino film actress Florida Yapco, better known as Mona Lisa
- The Fleur de Lys, a British band from the mid-1960s
- Fleur de Lis Stakes, a thoroughbred horse race at Churchill Downs, Kentucky
- Fleur de lis, a flight maneuver performed by the Blue Angels
- Fleur de Lys (restaurant), a fine-dining French cuisine restaurant in San Francisco, California and Las Vegas, Nevada.
- The Fascination of the Fleur de Lis, a 1915 silent film starring Lon Chaney, Sr.
- "Fleur De Lys", a song by Juliana Hatfield from the 1995 album Only Everything
