= LeFlore (surname) =

LeFlore is a surname. Notable people with the surname include:

- Basil LeFlore (1811-1886), governor of the Choctaw nation (1860-1875)
- Greenwood LeFlore (1800-1865), Principal Chief of the Choctaw (1830 to removal) and American politician
- John L. LeFlore (1903-1976), American civil rights leader and politician
- Robert LeFlore Jr. (1931–1993), American politician and social worker
- Ron LeFlore (born 1948), American former Major League Baseball player
- Thomas LeFlore, a Chocktaw district chief in the 1830s and '40s
