= Anthropometry of the upper arm =

Set of measurements of the shape of the upper arms

The anthropometry of the upper arm is a set of measurements of the shape of the upper arms.

The principal anthropometry measures are the upper arm length, the triceps skin fold (TSF), and the (mid-)upper arm circumference ((M)UAC). The derived measures include the (mid-)upper arm muscle area ((M)UAMA), the (mid-)upper arm fat area ((M)UAFA), and the arm fat index. Although they are not directly convertible into measures of overall body fat weight and density, and research has questioned the connection between skinfold fat and deep body fat measurements, these measures are and have been used as rough indicators of body fat.

Factors influencing the bone, fat, and muscle composition of the upper arm include age, sex, nutritional status, fitness training level, and race.

== Measures ==
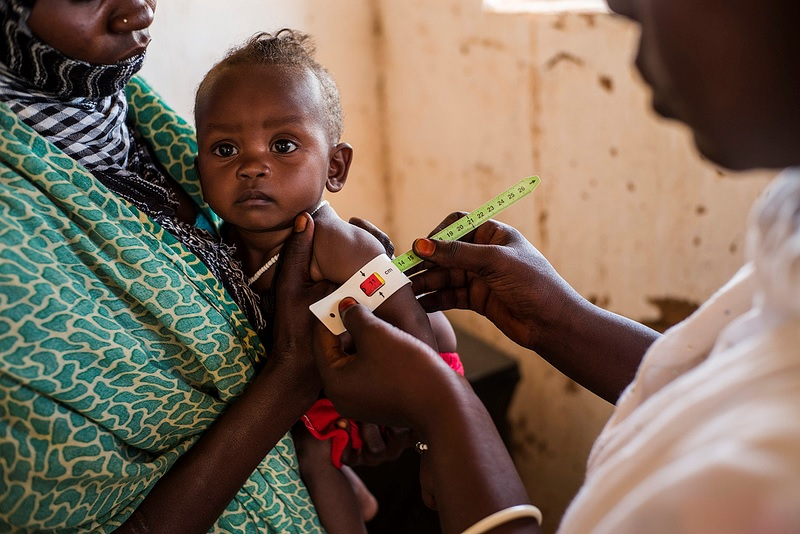
A standardised measuring tape is used to ascertain the mid-upper arm circumference of a child.

The anthropometric measures of the upper arm are divided into principal measures, which are measured directly, and derived measures, which are derived from the principal measures using specific formulae and empirically-derived corrections. The derived measures attempt to provide better indicators of body composition and nutritional status than the principal measures, by accounting for the fact that external measurements of the arm necessarily compound measurements of bone, fat, and muscle.

=== Principal measures ===
The three principal anthropometric measures of the upper arm are the upper arm length, the triceps skin fold (TSF), and the mid-upper arm circumference (MUAC).

The triceps skin fold is the width of a fold of skin taken over the triceps muscle. It is measured using skinfold calipers. (See Body fat percentage § Skinfold methods for general information on skinfold fat measurements.) The measurement is taken at a standardized position (one of eight standard skinfold measurement points) at the midpoint of the back of the upper arm. The skinfold calipers are spring-loaded. Holtain skinfold calipers are marked with 0.2 mm gradation, and Lange calipers with 0.5 mm gradation.

The measurement is taken with the person standing upright, with arms hanging down loosely. The skin fold is pulled away from the muscle and measured with the calipers, taking a reading 4 seconds after the calipers have been released. The measuring point is halfway between the olecranon process of the ulna and the acromion process of the scapula.

The mid-upper arm circumference is the circumference of the upper arm at that same midpoint, measured with a non-stretchable tape measure or 3D printable bands.

=== Derived measures ===
The derived anthropometric measures include the mid-upper arm muscle area (MUAMA), the upper arm fat area (UFA), and the arm fat index.

The mid-upper arm area (MUAA) is an estimation of the area of the upper arm. It is derived from the MUAC using the following formula:

- $MUAA = \frac{MUAC^2}{4 \pi}$

The mid-upper arm muscle circumference (MUAMC) is an estimation of the circumference of the bone and muscle portions of the upper arm. It is derived from the MUAC and the TSF by accounting for the thickness of the subcutaneous fat that surrounds the muscle, using the following formula, with the MUAC and TSF values measured in millimetres:

- $MUAMC = MUAC - \left ( \pi \times \frac{TSF}{10} \right )$

The mid-upper arm muscle area (MUAMA) is an estimation of the area of the bone and muscle portions of the upper arm. It is derived from the MUAMC using the following formula, with the MUAMC as above:

- $MUAMA = \frac{MUAMC^2}{4 \pi}$

The corrected mid-upper arm muscle area (CMUAMA) is an estimation of the area of the muscle portions of the upper arm, attempting to eliminate the area due to bone. It is derived from the MUAMC using the following two formulae, with the MUAC and TSF values measured in centimetres:

- For men: $CMUAMA = \frac{\left ( MUAC - \left ( \pi \times \frac{TSF}{10} \right ) \right )^2 - 10}{4 \pi}$
- For women: $CMUAMA = \frac{\left ( MUAC - \left ( \pi \times \frac{TSF}{10} \right ) \right )^2 - 6.5}{4 \pi}$

The mid-upper arm fat area (MUAFA) is an estimation of the area of the far portions of the upper arm, and is simply the difference between the MUAA and the MUAMA:

- $MUAFA = MUAA - MUAMA$

From the MUAFA is derived the arm fat index (AFI), a percentage of the arm that is fat, using the following formula:

- $AFI = 100 \times \frac{MUAFA}{MUAA}$

== Theory and practice ==
=== Validity ===
The sex-specific constant correction values in the corrected MUAMA formulae are derived from empirical studies. The MUAMA formula assumes that the upper arm has a circular cross-section, with a uniform subcutaneous fat layer and negligible bone content. This is, of course, not the case in reality. The correction factors are attempts to discount the contribution of the humerus. By comparing MUAMA values against computed tomography, studies by Heymsfield et al. found that, at the maximum circumference of the triceps, the contribution of bone to the total cross-sectional area was 18% in men and 17% in women, which were 10 cm^{2} and 6.5 cm^{2} respectively.

Even the corrected MUAMA formulae are not valid for people who are obese or for older people. They tend to overestimate muscle area for obese people. The results of the formulae can contain small but significant errors in the cases of young people, and errors of up to 41.5% for older people. Moreover, the size of the humerus is not in fact equal in all individuals. It also varies with nutritional status.

The formulae for the derived measures are based upon an assumption that the arm is cylindrical in shape, and are thus based upon the simple geometry of a cylinder. The arm is not in fact an ideal cylinder. However, the assumptions of the formulae yield results that are close enough to the actual reality that the measurements are reliable and accurate when averaged over groups of people.

The principal measurements are also subject to error. Taking a triceps skin fold measurement too frequently or for too long can result in compression of the tissue, and false readings, for example. Even which arm is measured matters, since mid-upper arm circumference is generally greater on the dominant arm (e.g. the right arm for right-handed people). Few studies make specific note of which arms were measured.

=== Evaluation ===
The various measures are evaluated against anthropometric reference data tables, such as those derived from the National Health and Nutrition Examination Survey data. Mid-upper arm circumference (MUAC) measurement, if conducted by well-trained staff, can give a quick assessment of new arrivals at a refugee camp during a humanitarian crisis. It is based on the observation that this measurement does not change much in children between 6 months and five years old, so comparison to a "normal" measurement is useful. Based on analysis of field results, MUAC < 125 mm corresponds to Global Acute Malnutrition and MUAC < 115 mm with or without oedema corresponds to Severe Acute Malnutrition.

=== Correlation ===
The various measures have been shown to have correlation to other measurements of body fat, including those derived from X-ray absorptiometry.

However, the relationship between measurements of subcutaneous fat in skinfolds, such as the triceps skinfold, and deep body fat have been questioned. Early research in the 1960s found a positive correlation between the two, and the skinfold measurements do provide a reasonable estimate of the deep body fat. However, research in the 1980s used computed tomography to measure deep fat, and showed a lack of correlation between that and subcutaneous fat. However, for children and adolescents the skinfold and circumference measurements provide a fair assessment of total body fat because that is where most body fat lies during those stages of human growth.

== Variations ==
Many factors influence the bone, fat, and muscle composition of the upper arm, and their measurements can vary by age, gender, obesity, fitness training status, and race. (This is one reason that anthropometrists have to be careful about what reference data and correction values they employ for individuals.) The World Health Organization uses arm circumference-for-age as an anthropometric indicator for its Child growth standards.

One cause of age variations is the tendency for body fat to be deposited internally, rather that subcutaneously, as one ages.

Nutritional factors include zinc intake, which has been shown to have effects on both the triceps skin fold thickness and the mid-upper arm circumference.
