= Flora (disambiguation) =

Flora is plant life collectively.

Flora may also refer to:

== Microbiology ==
- Flora (microbiology), collective bacteria and other microorganisms in a host
- Flora or microbiota, the collective bacteria and other microorganisms in an animal host

== People and fictional characters ==
- Flora (mythology), a goddess in Roman mythology
- Flora (given name), including a list of people and fictional characters with the name
- Flora (surname), a list of people with the name

== Places ==
=== Norway ===
- Flora, Trøndelag, a village in Selbu Municipality in Trøndelag county
- Flora Municipality, a former municipality in the old Sogn og Fjordane county

=== United States ===
- Flora Lake, California
- Flora, Florida, a former community
- Flora, Illinois, a city
- Flora Township, Boone County, Illinois
- Flora, Indiana, a town
- Flora Township, Dickinson County, Kansas
- Flora, Louisiana, an unincorporated community
- Flora Township, Renville County, Minnesota
- Flora, Mississippi, a town
- Flora, Ohio, a ghost town
- Flora, Oregon, an unincorporated community

=== Elsewhere ===
- Flora, Apayao, a municipality in the Philippines
- Flora, Suriname, a resort
- Flora Hill, Bendigo, Australia
- Mount Flora, Antarctic Peninsula

== Arts and entertainment ==
=== Music ===
- Flora (album), a 2006 album by Hiroshi Yoshimura
- La Flora, a 1628 opera by Marco da Fagliano
- Florakören, also called Flora, a Finnish choir
- Flora (aka Lily of the West), an Irish folk song
- "Flora", a song by Pinegrove from 11:11 (2022)

=== Paintings ===
- Flora (Francesco Melzi)
- Flora (De Morgan)
- Flora (Rembrandt, Hermitage)
- Flora (Titian)
- Flora (Jan Massys)

=== Sculptures ===
- Flora Fountain, South Mumbai, India
- Flora (bust), a bust attributed to Leonardo da Vinci

=== Other arts and entertainment ===
- Flora (film), a 2017 Canadian independent film
- An elephant in the 2008 film Saving Flora (2018), performed by Tia
- An elephant and the namesake of Circus Flora
- Cure Flora, a character in Go! Princess PreCure

== Other uses ==
- Hurricane Flora, one of the deadliest hurricanes on record
- HMS Flora, several British warships
- Flora family, a large grouping of asteroids
  - 8 Flora, the largest asteroid in the family
- Flora (Prague Metro), a metro station in Prague, Czech Republic
- Flora station (Illinois), a historic rail depot in Flora, Illinois, United States
- The Flora, a closed pub in London, England
- Flora Chapel, a church in Selbu municipality in Trøndelag county, Norway
- FC Flora, a football team in Tallinn, Estonia
- Flora (publication), a printed or digital work that describes the plant species in a particular area or region
- Flora (margarine), a brand of margarine
- Flora (grape), a California wine grape
- Flora (camouflage), a Russian Army camouflage pattern

== See also ==
- Flora-2, open-source software for knowledge representation and reasoning
- Flores (disambiguation)
- Floro (disambiguation)
