= Floto (disambiguation) =

Floto may refer to:

== Companies ==
- Floto, American manufacturer of American leather product
- Sells Floto Circus, American circus, named after Otto Floto

== People ==
- Florian Floto (born 1988), German archer
- Otto Floto (1863–1929), American sports journalist

== See also ==
- Floro (disambiguation)
- Flot (disambiguation)
- Flotow
