= Satoshi Ashikawa =

Satoshi Ashikawa 芦川聡
- Born: Satoshi Ashikawa; May 7, 1953
- Died: July 28, 1983 (aged 30)
- Genres: Ambient; minimal; environmental; electronic
- Occupations: Composer; Producer; Record store owner
- Instrument: Synthesizer
- Years active: 1974-83

Satoshi Ashikawa (芦川聡) was a Japanese musician, composer, producer and record store owner. He is considered one of the earliest flag bearers of ambient music in Japan.

== Life and career ==
Ashikawa graduated from the Department of Sociology at Tokyo's Keio University in 1977. His first musical performance was at Sōgetsu Kaikan Hall in 1974 and he participated in performances at many galleries and cultural spaces across Japan during the late 1970s.

Ashikawa founded the record and book store Art Vivant in Ikebukuro, Tokyo in 1975. The shop was one of the first in Japan to import Brian Eno's Ambient records alongside a niche selection of avant garde and ethnographic LPs, and became a hub for the influential kankyō ongaku (環境音楽) 'environmental music' scene. Ashikawa's keyboard piece 'Still Space' was later featured as the opening track on Light in the Attic's compilation Kankyō Ongaku: Japanese Ambient, Environmental & New Age Music 1980-1990.

=== Sound Process and Still Way ===
In 1982, Ashikawa co-founded the record label Sound Process with colleague Munetaka Tanaka, which soon grew into a sound design consultancy firm and book publisher. The label released three LPs as part of the Wave Notation series: Hiroshi Yoshimura's Music For Nine Post Cards (1982), Ashikawa's Still Way (1982) and Satsuki Shibano's Erik Satie (France 1866-1925) (1984). Still Way was Ashikawa's only full-length release and featured celebrated percussionist Midori Takada alongside harp, piano and flute players. Ashikawa described the album as "intended to be listened to in a casual manner, as a musical landscape or a sound object... not something that would stimulate listeners but music that should drift like smoke and become part of the environment."

The album received a resurgence in popularity thanks to online sharing in the late 2010s and was reissued on CD and vinyl in 2019 by WRWTFWW Records. Crack Magazine included the album in their list of '7 essential Japanese ambient and new age records', FACT called it "a record of chilly, beautiful stillness", and Exclaim! named it an "ambient masterpiece".

Ashikawa was killed in a car accident the year following the release of Still Way.

== Discography ==
=== Albums ===
- Still Way, LP (1982) - Sound Process - as composer and producer
- Hiroshi Yoshimura, Music For Nine Post Cards, LP/cassette (1982) - Sound Process - as producer

=== Appearances ===
- 'Free Music Rev. vol.2' (recorded 1977 with Tatsuo Hattori, violin) on Japanese Underground Music in the Late 70s and 80s, CD (2016) - Loft Books
- 'Still Space' on Tra New Artist Catalogue No.4, cassette (1983) - Tra Project
- 'Still Space' on Kankyō Ongaku (Japanese Ambient, Environmental & New Age Music 1980 - 1990), LP/CD (2019) - Light In The Attic Records
