= Baltimore and Ohio Railroad Depot =

Baltimore and Ohio Railroad Depot may refer to:

- Baltimore and Ohio Railroad Depot (Flora, Illinois), listed on the National Register of Historic Places in Clay County, Illinois
- Baltimore and Ohio Railroad Depot (Willard, Ohio), listed on the National Register of Historic Places in Huron County, Ohio
- Baltimore and Ohio Railroad Depot (Huntington, West Virginia), listed on the National Register of Historic Places in Cabell County, West Virginia
