= Flora (album) =

Studio album by Hiroshi Yoshimura
- Released: 21 April 2006
- Recorded: 1987
- Studio: Hiroo 806
- Genre: Ambient
- Length: 58:16
- Label: Prem Promotion

Hiroshi Yoshimura chronology
Soft Wave for Automatic Music Box (2005)	Flora (2006)

Flora (also known as Flora 1987) is a studio album by Japanese musician Hiroshi Yoshimura. It was released posthumously on 21 April 2006 through Prem Promotion, and later reissued on 20 March 2025 through Temporal Drift.

== Background ==
Hiroshi Yoshimura was a Japanese composer and sound designer. He was born in Yokohama, Kanagawa Prefecture, in 1940. He created Flora in 1987, following his 1986 albums Surround and Green. He died in 2003, at the age of 63, from skin cancer. The album was released on 21 April 2006 through Prem Promotion. It was reissued on 20 March 2025 through Temporal Drift.

== Critical reception ==
Professional ratings
Review scores
Source	Rating
Pitchfork	8.5/10
Spectrum Culture	80%
Uncut	4.5/5 stars

Shy Thompson of Bandcamp Daily wrote, "The FM synthesizer of previous releases is mostly absent, with Yoshimura opting for a more organic sound." She added, "Unadorned acoustic and electric keys take the focus; his playing is airy and expressive." Katie Hawthorne of Resident Advisor stated, "We'll never know precisely why he delayed its release, but I'm choosing to believe that the LP's playful tensions and unusually straightforward melodies are the sound of Yoshimura musing on his influences, as well as his lifelong artistic limbo between sound and music; noise and narrative."

The album was nominated for Best Reissue at the 2026 Libera Awards.

== Track listing ==
All tracks are written by Hiroshi Yoshimura.

Flora track listing
No.	Title	Length
1.	"Over the Clover" (オーバー・ザ・クローバー)	6:40
2.	"Flora" (フローラ)	6:02
3.	"Asagao" (アサガオ)	5:53
4.	"Ojigisou" (オジギソウ)	2:50
5.	"Maple Syrup Factory" (メイプル・シロップ・ファクトリー)	4:57
6.	"Adelaide" (アデレード)	7:11
7.	"Wind Echo" (ウィンド・エコー)	2:55
8.	"Trick Tree" (トリック・ツリー)	5:50
9.	"Kasumi" (カスミ)	5:56
10.	"Silence" (サイレンス)	5:15
11.	"Satie on the Grass" (サティ・オン・ザ・グラス)	4:47
Total length:		58:16

== Personnel ==
Credits adapted from liner notes.

Original credits:

- Hiroshi Yoshimura – performance, recording, photography
- Yasushi Takamatsu – production
- Tamiko Hohda – production
- Toshikazu Goto (Gift Lab) – art direction
- Fumiko Ikeda (Gift Lab) – art direction
- Masahito Suda (Takuu Tuore Inc.) – cover design

Reissue credits:

- Yosuke Kitazawa – reissue production
- Patrick McCarthy – reissue production
- John Baldwin – remastering
- Tiffanie Tran – reissue layout, reissue design

== Charts ==
Chart performance for Flora
Chart (2025)	Peak position
UK Album Downloads (Official Charts)	61
