= Flora station =

Flora station could refer to:

- Flora station (Illinois), a historic rail depot in Flora, Illinois, United States
- Flora (Prague Metro), a metro station in Prague, Czech Republic
- Bovenkarspel Flora railway station, a station in the Netherlands
