= Surround (Hiroshi Yoshimura album) =

Studio album by Hiroshi Yoshimura
- Released: January 1986
- Studios: Hiroo 806; Kojima Recording
- Genre: Ambient
- Length: 39:52
- Label: Misawa Homes

Hiroshi Yoshimura chronology
A・I・R (1984)	Surround (1986)	Green (1986)

Surround (also known as Soundscape 1: Surround) is a studio album by Japanese musician Hiroshi Yoshimura. It was released in January 1986 through Misawa Homes. It was later reissued in 2023 through Temporal Drift.

== Background ==
Hiroshi Yoshimura was a Japanese composer and sound designer. He was born in Yokohama, Kanagawa Prefecture, in 1940. His debut solo album, Music for Nine Post Cards, was released in 1982.

Surround was commissioned by Misawa Homes Institute of Research and Development to create "a set of soundscapes for the company's prefabricated houses." The album contains six ambient compositions. It was developed at the same time as Yoshimura's Green (1986). It was released in January 1986, as part of Misawa Homes' Soundscape series. Its initial title was Soundscape 1: Surround.

Yoshimura died in 2003, at the age of 63, from skin cancer. Surround was reissued in 2023 through Temporal Drift.

== Critical reception ==
Professional ratings
Review scores
Source	Rating
Pitchfork	9.0/10
Spectrum Culture	70%

Patrick St. Michel of Bandcamp Daily called the album "arguably the defining example of kankyō ongaku, Japanese for 'environmental music,' a style that enjoyed its heyday in the 1980s." He added, "More than just background music for new houses, Surround is a highlight of Yoshimura's catalog, and as good a definition of what kankyō ongaku is as exists." Irina Shtreis of The Quietus stated, "Regardless of the surroundings, listening to the album is a gratifying experience as it gives a strong sense of connection between the inner and outer worlds." She added, "Whether combined with Green or listened to on its own, Surround is a self-sufficient statement."

=== Accolades ===
Accolades for Surround
Publication	List	Rank	Ref.
The Vinyl Factory	Our Favourite Compilations and Reissues of 2023	—	

== Track listing ==
All tracks are written by Hiroshi Yoshimura.

Surround track listing
No.	Title	Length
1.	"Time After Time"	11:04
2.	"Surround"	3:44
3.	"Something Blue"	5:45
4.	"Time Forest"	10:48
5.	"Water Planet"	2:21
6.	"Green Shower"	6:08
Total length:		39:52

== Personnel ==
Credits adapted from liner notes.

Original credits:

- Hiroshi Yoshimura – performance
- Yukio Kojima – engineering
- Toshikazu Ota – design
- Yoichi Nagata – photography
- Misawa Homes Institute of Research and Development – production

Reissue credits:

- Yosuke Kitazawa – reissue production, translation
- Patrick McCarthy – reissue production
- John Baldwin – remastering, lacquering
- Gotta Groove Records – vinyl pressing
- Ella Gold – reissue design, reissue layout
- Satomi Sugiyama – artwork scanning
- Ward Long – retouching
- Hiroyoshi Shiokawa – reissue liner notes

== Charts ==
Chart performance for Surround
Chart (2024)	Peak position
UK Independent Albums (Official Charts)	47
