= Flotow =

Flotow is a German surname. Notable people with the surname include:

- Friedrich von Flotow (1812–1883), German composer
- Hans von Flotow (1862–1935), German diplomat
- Julius von Flotow (1788–1856), German lichenologist
- Ludwig von Flotow (1867–1948), Austro-Hungarian statesman
- Luise von Flotow, German-Canadian translator, author and academic
- Marie von Flotow (1817–1909), Russian courtier

== See also ==
- Floto (disambiguation)
- Groß Flotow
