= Ashikawa =

Ashikawa (written: 芦川) is a Japanese surname. Notable people with the surname include:

- Izumi Ashikawa (芦川 いずみ, born 1935), Japanese actress
- Satoshi Ashikawa (芦川 聡, 1953–1983), Japanese composer and producer
- Urara Ashikawa (芦川 うらら, born 2003), Japanese artistic gymnast
- Yoshimi Ashikawa (芦川 よしみ, born 1958), Japanese actress and singer
