= Hiroshi Yoshimura =

Japanese musician (1940–2003)

Hiroshi Yoshimura 吉村 弘

Background information
- Born: 22 October 1940; Yokohama, Kanagawa Prefecture, Japan
- Died: 23 October 2003 (aged 63)
- Genres: Ambient; minimal; environmental; electronic
- Occupations: Composer; songwriter
- Instruments: Piano; keyboard; Yamaha DX7; Yamaha TX7; Yamaha FB-01
- Years active: 1972–2003

Hiroshi Yoshimura (吉村 弘, Yoshimura Hiroshi; 22 October 1940 – 23 October 2003) was a Japanese musician and composer. He is considered a pioneer of ambient music in Japan. His music lies mostly in the minimalist genre of kankyō ongaku, or environment music—soft electronic melodies infused with the sounds of nature: babbling brooks, steady rain, and morning birds. However, not all Yoshimura's work included nature sounds. Green (1986) only had them in the United States release, as they were excluded in the Japanese version.

== Early life ==
Hiroshi Yoshimura was born in Yokohama, Kanagawa in 1940. He began learning piano at 5. He graduated from Waseda School of Letters, Arts and Sciences II in 1964. He was inspired by the Fluxus movement and the work of Harry Partch and Erik Satie.

== Career ==
He started the computer music group "Anonyme" in 1972. The 70's saw Yoshimura heavily inspired by Brian Eno, who had a similar minimalist ambient style.

In 1978, he was commissioned by the NHK to compose the piece "Alma's Cloud".

In addition to solo performances and improvisational music, he performed production performance and sound objects, environmental music containing graphic design and sound design, visual poetry, and worked on sound design business in collaboration with TOA. He also made music for galleries, museums, building spaces and train stations. He was at the forefront of environmental music. He worked as a part-time lecturer in the Industrial Design Department at the Faculty of Engineering of the Chiba University and at the Music Design Department of Kunitachi College of Music. He held workshops on citizen participation in museums.

Yoshimura's debut solo album, Music for Nine Post Cards, was released in 1982. He also released Surround (1986). His 1987 recording, Flora, was released posthumously in 2006.

== Death ==
Yoshimura died in 2003 after battling skin cancer.

== Legacy ==
In 2017, Yoshimura, as well as other ambient Japanese musicians, received a resurgence due to changes to the YouTube algorithm. In 2019, the song "Blink", from Yoshimura's debut album, was selected for compilation album Kankyo Ongaku: Japanese Ambient, Environmental & New Age Music 1980–1990. Starting in 2017, Light in the Attic Records has begun re-issuing some of Yoshimura's foundational releases, starting with his debut, Music for Nine Post Cards' re-issue releasing in 2017, later launching 'WATER COPY' a dedicated sub-label titled after the first track on Yoshimura's debut that was launched as a collaboration executed alongside Yoshimura's estate, with Green's re-issue in 2020, subsequently releasing Surround's re-issue in 2023, and Flora's in 2025.

His music has received much critical acclaim. In 2018, Crack Magazine selected his albums Green and Music for Nine Post Cards as the number 1 and number 7th most essential Japanese ambient albums, respectively. Malcolm Standing for Demo Magazine referred to Yoshimura as "one of the most influential and prolific of the artists to come out of Japan's ambient renaissance". Tom Moon of NPR noted Yoshimura as "one of the revered pioneers of Japanese electronic music". Pitchfork has highlighted all of Light in the Attic's Yoshimura re-issues thus far as their Best New Reissue designation, emphasizing Yoshimura's influence on the ambient scene as he "made music responding to and designed to exist in physical places... Yoshimura’s practice shines light onto corners of feeling that might otherwise go unnoticed."

== Discography ==
=== Studio albums ===
- Music for Nine Post Cards (1982)
- Pier & Loft (1983)
- A・I・R (Air in Resort) (1984)
- Surround (1986)
- Green (1986)
- Shizukesa no Hon (1988)
- Yoshimura Hiroshi no Mimi: Oto no Shima (1992)
- Wet Land (1993)
- Face Music (1994)
- Kankyō Enshutsu On (1995)
- Quiet Forest (1996)
- Four Post Cards (2004)
- Soft Wave for Automatic Music Box (2005)
- Flora (2006)
