= Gottlieb von Jagow =

German diplomat (1863–1935)

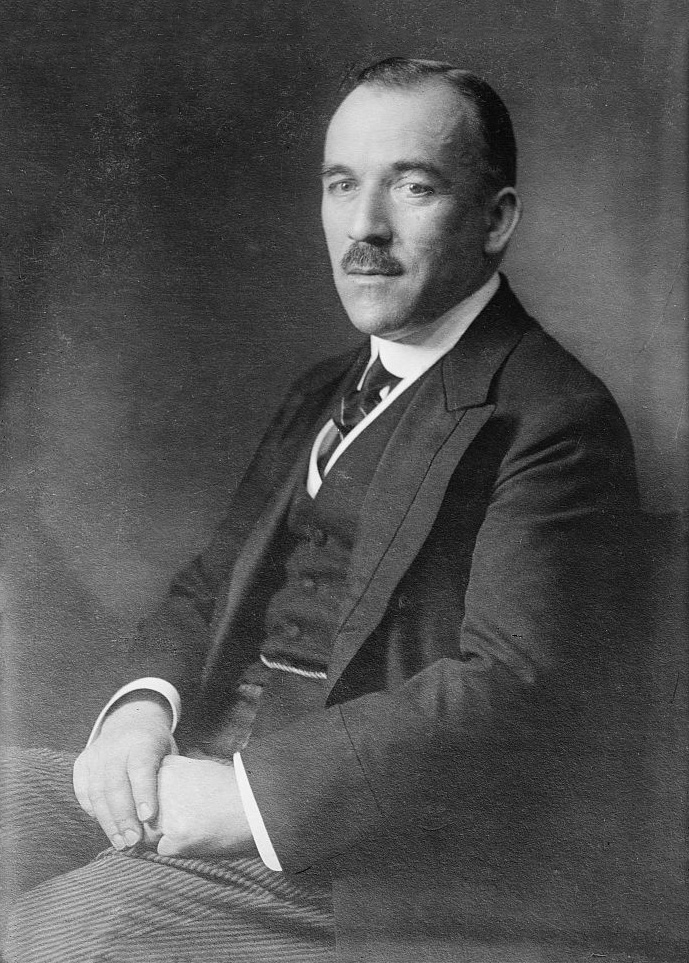
- Gottlieb von Jagow circa 1915

State Secretary for Foreign Affairs
- In office 11 January 1913 – 22 November 1916
- Monarch: Wilhelm II
- Chancellor: Theobald von Bethmann Hollweg
- Preceded by: Alfred von Kiderlen-Waechter
- Succeeded by: Arthur Zimmermann

German Ambassador to Italy
- In office 9 May 1909 – 11 January 1913
- Monarch: Wilhelm II
- Preceded by: Anton von Monts
- Succeeded by: Hans von Flotow

Personal details
- Born: 22 June 1863 Berlin, Kingdom of Prussia
- Died: 11 January 1935 (aged 71) Potsdam, Germany

Gottlieb von Jagow (22 June 1863 – 11 January 1935) was a German diplomat. He served as the State Secretary of the German Foreign Office between January 1913 and 1916.

== Early life ==
Born in Berlin, Jagow was educated at the University of Bonn. He entered the diplomatic service in 1895 and was first assigned to the German embassy in Rome and then to the Prussian mission at Munich. After he had passed his examination in diplomacy in 1897, he was assigned to the Prussian mission at Hamburg but quickly switched again to Rome, where he advanced to the position of Second Secretary (legation counsellor). After a short interlude with the German mission at The Hague, he returned as First Secretary to the embassy in Rome in March 1901, where he stayed until 1906, when he was transferred to the Foreign Office in Berlin. He first made his mark as private secretary to Bernhard von Bülow, a former Imperial Chancellor. In December 1907, he was appointed Envoy Extraordinary to Luxembourg, in May 1909 he became German ambassador at Rome. During the Italo-Turkish War, he conducted important negotiations with the Italian government and, it is said, prevented a war between Austria-Hungary and Italy at the time.

In 1913, he was appointed Secretary of State (Foreign Minister) for Germany. He played an active part in the negotiations preceding the outbreak of World War I and was particularly concerned with German relations with Austria-Hungary. He was the first member of the German government in Berlin to become acquainted with the terms of the ultimatum of 18 October 1913 to Serbia, the first indication of the July 1914 crisis.

However, Sir Martin Gilbert wrote, "War seemed unlikely in the spring and summer of 1914." The illusion of peace masked debates over aims of colonial annexation and supremacy in Africa, negotiated neutrality for other states to facilitate the invasion of France, and attempts to compete with British sea power. On 13 July 1914, Austro-Hungarian Emperor Franz Joseph was persuaded to accept the ultimatum after Serbia had failed to accommodate the Austrian note.

Jagow married Countess Luitgard Ernestine zu Solms-Laubach (Arnsburg, 17 December 1873 - Arnsburg, 24 January 1954) in Arnsburg on 18 June 1914.

== A diplomacy towards war ==
During the July Crisis on 6 July 1914, Jagow was confident that an Austro-Serbian war would be localized, and that Russia was not yet prepared for a continental war. This belief was incorrect: the Chancellor was more sceptical, which indirectly led to the outbreak of World War I. But by 29 July he was "very depressed" that Austria's Note policy of duality had hastened war. After the war, Jagow attributed deeper reasons for the outbreak of war to "this damned system of alliances." He had tried before war's outbreak to persuade the Chancellor to allow a debate at the Reichstag on war aims in 1916, but a veto was imposed, and a ban on all criticism of the government. Long conferences with the Chancellor and Kaiser did nothing to change his mood. He wrongly believed Britain would respect Germany's access to Rotterdam, part of the catalogue of grievances that caused the war. Consequently, he was perceived as the "weak" link in a weak government before being replaced. But he had always been aware of the French alliance with Britain. Furthermore, he made no secret of the racial Slavic nationalism threatened from Russia; as soon as her railways were complete she would invade. Jagow also indulged in taunting ally Austria as "nervous" while at the same time ignoring Serbia's pleadings for peace. He attempted to lull Britain into a false sense of security, while "cutting the lines" of diplomatic communication after it was too late. In fact the fortnight's delayed response to Austria's commencement of hostilities gave Jagow the opportunity to blame Russia for starting the war. On 24 July the British thought he was "quite ready to fall in with suggestion as to the four Powers working in favour of moderation at Vienna and St Petersburg" But he was already ill and exhausted from his exertions, acknowledging that Serbia was the victim of bullying. He was a member of the Foreign ministry team that denied a British offer for a Five Power Conference, having already agreed to Moltke's plan two days before Austria's declaration against Serbia on 28 July 1914. The following day Lichnowsky's cable telegram was ignored for hours, which Jagow argued was responsible for Bethmann-Hollweg's "misstep."

The secret mission of Sir William Tyrrell to Germany in summer 1914 was a pivotal event in the diplomatic history of the time. It aimed to establish an effective pact between the British and German Empires, which were at war. The mission was planned by Tyrrell, who was the private secretary to Sir Edward Grey, Tyrrell's meetings and correspondence with Jagow in 1914 reflected a bilateral interest in avoiding confrontation and adjusting Anglo-German relations for strategic benefit. The mission remained abortive—no formal Anglo-German treaty or alliance resulted. The outbreak of the July Crisis and eventual start of World War I overtook these diplomatic initiatives in sought to influence policy discreetly rather than through public channels, underlining the semi-official nature of the mission. Historians such as T.G. Otte emphasize that the Tyrrell-Jagow episode demonstrates possible alternative trajectories for 1914 Europe, highlighting that war was not completely inevitable. and it involved key officials in both London and Berlin.

=== Directing wartime foreign policy ===
The Offensive Plan was revised by Jagow and his Chancellor and delivered to the King of the Belgians the next day as an ultimatum in a sealed envelope with a note demanding "an unequivocal answer" to Germany's demand for her troops to be allowed to march through the country on the way to France.

The diminutive bureaucrat was eternally optimistic by character that German superiority would triumph. When the Ottoman Empire declared war on the Entente in November 1914, Jagow directed Leo Frobenius to try to persuade the government of Abyssinia to also join the Central Powers. The Tripolitana as it was known managed by the Mannesmann brothers was determined by economic realpolitik "to collaborate with Turkey in raising the Sudan in revolt." Stirring revolt dominated German foreign policy in the East; at the heart of which was Jagow's dialogue for the "liberation of Poland". Instrumental was Under Secretary Zimmerman, one of Bethmann's governmental supporters, who ran Agent Parvus in Constantinople: the aim was "the complete destruction of Tsarism and the dismemberment of Russia into smaller states". Nonetheless Jagow was naturally cautious and particularly skeptical of the Turks' commitment to the alliance. At the same time however, he successfully secured Turkish sovereign rights over the Dardanelles on 18 April 1915. Yet determined to continue the fight in Galicia, when Jagow received President Wilson's offer of an international peace congress negotiations, American mediation was flatly refused. He called it a schwarmerei; but as the war dragged on he became domineered by Zimmerman's pretensions for the Chancellery. Successes in Russia encouraged him to keep Austria-Hungary in the war by finesse of any possible rapprochement with the Tsarists.

Jagow subscribed to the school of thought that Russia had to be pushed back deep into her hinterland. The irredentist solution was one of the Polish Kingdom's independent enfranchisement, preventing the sullied blood to dilute German racial superiority. He told Baron Burian that the state must be ruled by Dualism and "very extensive autonomy" Austrian suzerainty. However, as in Belgium he sought "Pan-Germanisation", and a customs area from Austria-Hungary, safeguarding German exports. More sinister was a program for ethnic cleansing of Poles and Jews conditional on an Austro-German military alliance. Jagow himself favoured the latter policy of annexation and germanisation. He sent a Memorandum on 11 September to Falkenhayn, who rejected any possibility of an alliance with Austria's "slipshod" army. By 30 October Jagow had developed the idea that Courland and Lithuania should be annexed in return for Austrian-Poland "chaining" the Dual Monarchy's destiny to Germany's. An able and skilful diplomat, he persuaded the General Staff to drop objections to the political proposal to impose Mitteleuropa on Vienna. The threat in Jagow's mind was Slavic nationalism. (Note: Austria-Hungary was divided between the Magyars and Germans as defined by the Treaty of 7 October 1879, revived for the Kaiser's government.)

Wilson's aide, Colonel House, reassured Jagow that US policy in 1916 was not designed to blame the civilian politicians but only the military: according to Friedrich Katz, Jagow was the principal supporter of a failed plan designed to involve the United States and Mexico in a war. At the time the Mexican Revolution had created rising tensions between both countries. As a result, Jagow expected that the United States would not enter World War I if it was militarily involved with Mexico. Nonetheless Jagow was responsible for the Longwiy-Breiy Plan to occupy the plateau that overlooked the city of Verdun made possible by Baron Romberg's visit to Berlin. But it was merely a pretext for a new extension of German strategy deeper into France proper.

Jagow remained steadfastly anti-Russian, to the extent he sacked staff to get a putative alliance with Ushida, the Japanese ambassador. His meddling with Ushida in St Petersburg got him 'discarded' too for attempting a separate peace with Russia on Germany's behalf; he even confessedly admitted on 17 May 1916 that the "whole swindle ceases to matter". Any diplomatic rapprochement was broken as it was unplanned, when Russia launched the Brusilov Offensive that summer. Jagow's policy had woefully failed: he was scheming to introduce a Grand Duchy of Poland as Germany conspired to divide the country in half adopted Falkenhayn's policy idea of a Germano-Polish Kingdom was declared on 5 November 1916; and a Flamenpolitik for the Poles, the Klub des polnischen Staatswesens. He recognised that Austria's defeat had collapsed the front to Germany's detriment. but Germany ignored Jagow's former policy of a 'preventive war' now discredited; for he had to do something that "assures our future". The new Ludendorff alternative would make Poland "also completely dependent on her economically".

Jagow retired in November 1916. A quiet, unassuming and scholarly man, he was one of the worst speakers in the Reichstag. James W. Gerard, United States ambassador to Germany at the time, in his book My Four Years in Germany, said Jagow was forced out of office by an agitation against him on account of his lack of force in defending government policy in the Reichstag.

Jagow wrote a defence of German policy entitled Ursachen und Ausbruch des Weltkrieges (“Causes and the outbreak of the World War”), published in 1919.

== Honours ==
- Knight Grand cross in the Order of Leopold, 1913;
- Commander of the Order of Orange-Nassau, 11 February 1901.
