= Music for Nine Post Cards =

Music For Nine Post Cards

Studio album by Hiroshi Yoshimura
- Released: 1982
- Recorded: 1982
- Genres: Ambient; minimalist
- Length: 45:24
- Labels: Sound Process; Light In The Attic Records; Empire Of Signs
- Producer: Hiroshi Yoshimura

Hiroshi Yoshimura chronology
Music For Nine Post Cards (1982)	Pier & Loft (1983)

Music For Nine Post Cards is the debut studio album by Hiroshi Yoshimura, released by Sound Process in 1982 and rereleased by Empire of Signs in 2017.

== Background and recording ==
The album was home-recorded with a keyboard and Fender Rhodes. In the liner notes Yoshimura stated that he was inspired by "the movements of clouds, the shade of a tree in summertime, the sound of rain, the snow in a town."

Amidst the sessions for the project, Yoshimura visited the then-new Hara Museum of Contemporary Art, leaving the museum inspired and fascinated by its architecture, he envisioned his ongoing material in relation with the museum's space, later asking the museum about having the finished album being played there. The album's title nod back to a series of nine viewpoints in the museum at which Yoshimura had suggested the compositions would be played at.

== Release ==
Yoshimura originally sent the Hara Museum of Contemporary Art a copy of the album intended to be played in the building but after much interest from visitors the album was then given a wide release as the first instalment in Satoshi Ashikawa's series "Wave Notation" in Japan. In 2017 the album was reissued by Empire of Signs, the first time outside of Japan.

== Reception ==
Professional ratings
Review scores
Source	Rating
Pitchfork	8.5/10
Spectrum Culture	4/5
The Times	4/6 stars

Upon its rerelease in 2017 the album received critical acclaim. Thea Ballard of Pitchfork wrote that the songs "have a disarming presence, cutting sweetly into the listener’s reality" and that "The effect is multidimensional: melancholy, wistful, invigorating, consoling." Eric D. Bernasek of Spectrum Culture in a positive review, stated that album is "uniformly calm and wistful, evoking the subtly discomfiting melancholy of nostalgia"; however, they criticised the song "Urban Snow" feeling that "The track limits the album’s usefulness as environmental music" by having a spoken word passage in it, and that "its mere presence compromises the purity of the rest by breaking the spell that was cast by the album’s overall restraint and uniformity".

== Legacy ==
In 2018 Crack Magazine selected Music For Nine Post Cards as one of seven essential Japanese ambient albums.

== Track listing ==
All tracks written and produced by Hiroshi Yoshimura.

No.	Title	Length
1.	"Water Copy"	6:11
2.	"Clouds"	5:54
3.	"Blink"	4:42
4.	"Dance Pm"	6:32
5.	"Ice Copy"	2:55
6.	"Soto Wa Ame - Rain out of Window"	4:36
7.	"View From My Window"	6:15
8.	"Urban Snow"	4:45
9.	"Dream"	5:34
