= Environmentalism in music =

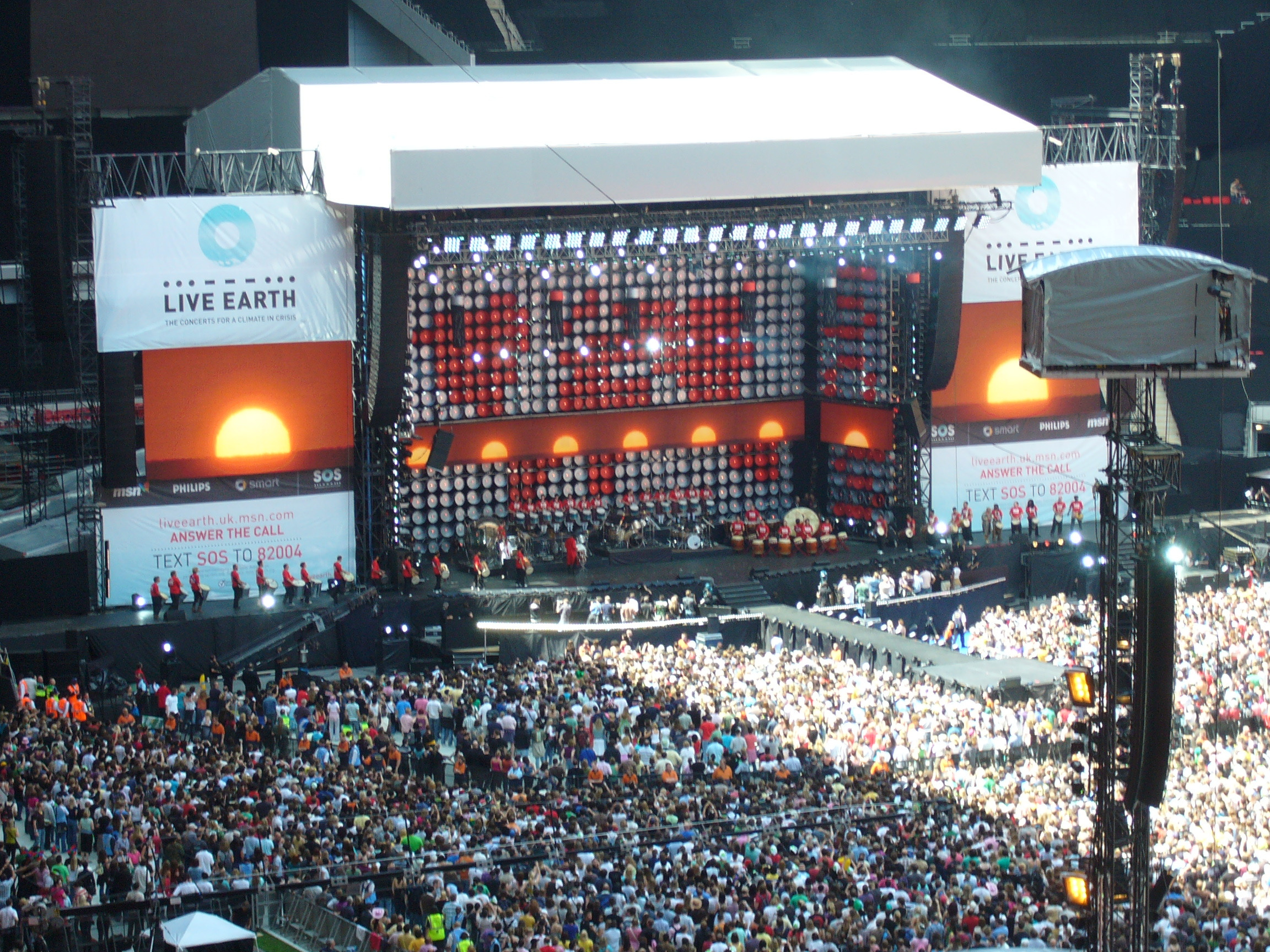
The 2007 Live Earth concert at Wembley Stadium

Environmentalism has been a theme and cultural trend in popular music. Ecomusicologists (musicologists and ethnomusicologists focusing on music and environmental issues) and music educators are increasingly emphasizing the intersections of music and nature, and the role of music in ecological activism.

Environmental themes in music have ranged from an appreciation of nature and wilderness and advocating for its protection, to environmental degradation, pollution and climate change. The earliest popular music exploring environmentalist topics can be traced back to the 19th century and early folk, gospel and blues music. The counterculture of the 1960s facilitated an increase in environmental music that continued into subsequent decades. Genres that have addressed the topic include hip hop, punk rock, heavy metal and modern classical.

Some musical artists have used their platform to promote and raise money for environmental causes. Efforts have also been made to improve the sustainability of the music industry and live music.

== History in popular music ==
=== Early examples ===
Some of the earliest songs to cover environmental topics originate from the 19th century, with one example being "Woodman! Spare that Tree!" by George Pope Morris and Henry Russell. Folk music explored environmental topics throughout the 1930s and 1940s.

Icelandic music has had a long tradition of prominently featuring nature since the country's independence in 1944.

=== 1960s-1970s ===
After a radioactive isotope (Strontium-90) was found in cows milk in 1959, the concern for the environmental effects of the nuclear arms race increased. This sparked songs about the invisibility of environmental effects like radioactive isotopes. In his song "Mack the Bomb", Pete Seeger wrote a comparison between a shark and Strontium-90, explaining that the threat of a shark is at least visible, unlike radioactive isotopes. In 1962, Malvina Reynolds also wrote a song called "What Have They Done to the Rain?", which was inspired by above-ground nuclear testing, and how it was putting Strontium-90 into the air, then into soil through rain, which is how it got into cows and their milk. Songwriter Peter La Farge released As Long as the Grass Shall Grow in 1963, a collection of native American songs discussing environmental destruction.

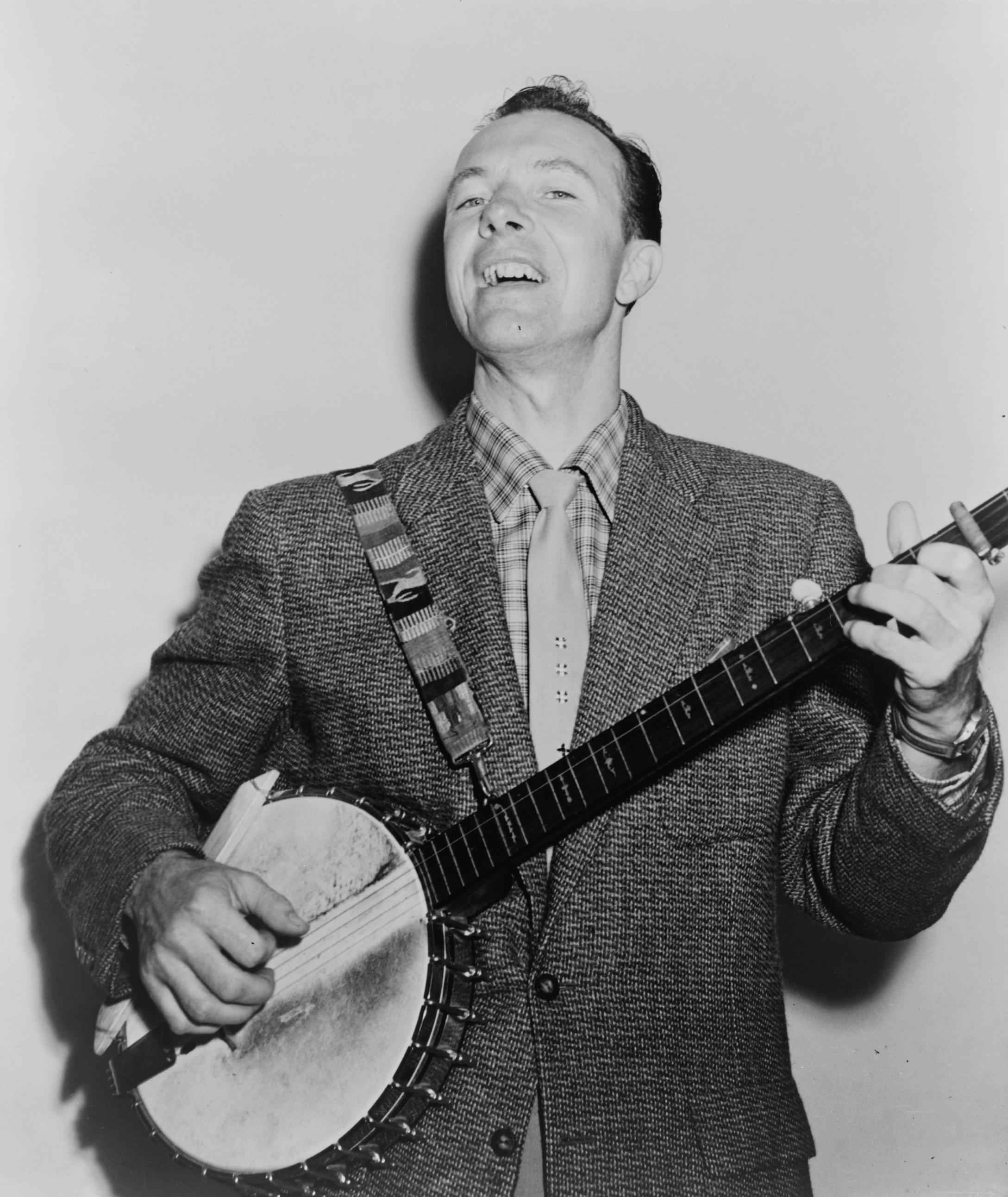
Pete Seeger's God Bless the Grass (1966) has been described as the first environmentalist album.

Pete Seeger released what is considered the first environmentalist album, entitled "God Bless the Grass" in 1966. The 1960s produced a large number of environmental-focused songs, primarily due to the popularization of folk music and the musicians that penned many environmental protest songs, in that genre.

In the 1960s and 1970s, popular music was influenced by the counterculture movement, anti-Vietnam war movement and the civil rights movement. The inaugural Earth Day and founding of Greenpeace, the 1969 Santa Barbara oil spill and passing of the National Environmental Policy Act were influential on music in the early 1970s. "Big Yellow Taxi" by Joni Mitchell referenced DDT following Rachel Carson's 1962 book Silent Spring, which had brought the dangers of DDT to popular attention. John Denver, a country and folk singer often sang about the wilderness of Colorado with popular songs such as "Rocky Mountain High" and "Take Me Home, Country Roads". The Beach Boys also explored environmental concerns, particularly pollution, in Surf's Up (1971) songs "Don't Go Near the Water" and "A Day in the Life of a Tree".

In 1970, environmentalist opposition to nuclear testing in Amchitka prompted a benefit concert in Vancounver organised by popular musicians James Taylor, Joni Mitchell and Phil Ochs to raise money for a voyage of activist group Don't Make a Wave Committee on the Phyllis Cormack to oppose the test. This concert and subsequent voyage sparked the foundation of influential environmental group Greenpeace.

In 1979, English electronic band Orchestral Manoeuvres in the Dark released the single "Electricity", which addresses society's wastage of electricity and the need for alternative energy sources.

The primary view perpetuated by mainstream versions of environmental music from the 1960s onward have foregrounded the idyllic cohabitation of natural landscapes and humankind. The shorthand being the pastoral mode. However the pastoral mode has been used to perpetuate beliefs of a separate and untouched wilderness, as well as anti urbanism. These beliefs do not reflect critical environmental justice practices, which emphasize multidimensionality and intersectionality in issues relating to human health and environmental degradation. The pastoral mode also excluded experiences of minority groups that are an integral part of pastoral landscapes, as well as face the effects of food and heat deserts, increased pollution, unclean water, and more in urban areas.

=== 1980s-1990s ===
Popular musicians in the 1980s, including U2, R.E.M., Grateful Dead and George Harrison would continue to support Greenpeace by contributing tracks to compilation albums and appearing at benefit concerts, including notably Greenpeace – The Album. Prince, R.E.M. and Sting also successfully pressured record labels to phase out additional packaging for CDs to reduce their contribution to waste and pollution.

In the UK, the leading ethical music festival, Glastonbury Festival, has for decades supported environmental causes with its fundraising activities. The 1971 Glastonbury Fayre (the second Glastonbury event, the legendary free festival) espoused an environmentalist ethos in its very publicity: 'If the festival has a specific intention it is to create an increase in the power of the Universe, a heightening of consciousness and a recognition of our place in the function of this our tired and molested planet.' As it established itself through the 1980s, Glastonbury worked with the Campaign for Nuclear Disarmament, which was a primary beneficiary of its funds. In 1992, it shifted its support to the international environmental campaign organisation Greenpeace, which has remained a key partner for over 30 years.

In 1995 singer Michael Jackson came out with the hit "Earth Song" which was about environmental and animal welfare. The production of the music video had an environmental theme, showing images of animal cruelty, deforestation, pollution, poverty, and war. Jackson and the world's people unite in a spiritual chant—"Earth Song"—which summons a force that heals the world. Using special effects, time is reversed so that life returns, war ends, and the forests regrow. The video closes with a request for donations to Jackson's Heal the World Foundation. The clip was shown infrequently in the United States.

=== 2000s ===
In 2007, a massive concert entitled Live Earth was held in several locations around the world simultaneously to raise awareness and provoke action on climate change.

In 2009 Disney created a campaign called Disney's Friends for Change which helped to promote an environmental message. A song called Send it On recorded by Disney singers Miley Cyrus, Demi Lovato, the Jonas Brothers and Selena Gomez was produced, and the profits were donated to environmental charity organizations.

=== 2010s-2020s ===
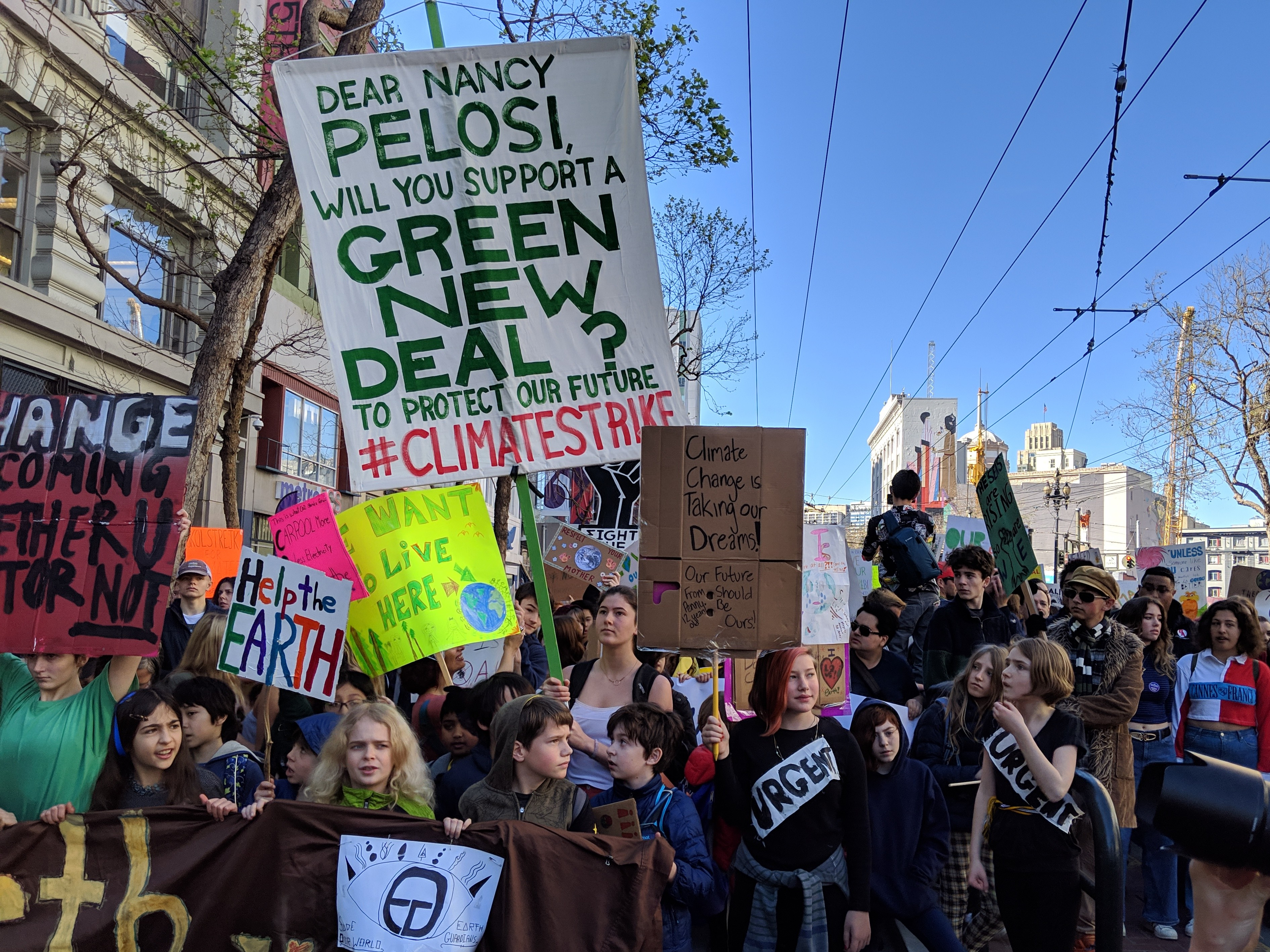
The climate movement influenced an increase in climate change-related music during the 2010s.

The Gorillaz album Plastic Beach (2010) focused on plastic pollution and Björk's Biophilia was inspired by her interest in nature and environmental concerns.

Climate change became a more prevalent topic in music during the 2010s, owing to changes in public opinion and the influence of the climate movement, youth strikes and Greta Thunberg. A number of figures and groups from the music industry in the United Kingdom formed Music Declares Emergency in 2019 and declared a climate emergency. Grimes released a climate-themed album Miss Anthropocene in 2020, and 2019 Lil Dicky charity single "Earth" featured numerous celebrities and attracted considerable social media attention.

Taiwan's Sheng-Xiang Band has been described as pioneering exploring environmental topics in the music of their home country. Their 2016 album Village Besieged has been described as an elegy for victims of Taiwan's petrochemical pollution.

=== 2020s–present ===
Billie Eilish's first album featured the song "All Good Girls Go to Hell," which was meant to bring attention to humans inability to stop climate change. It came out in the aftermath of a series of forest fires which is what the song was mainly targeted at.

The 1975's track "The 1975" is entirely dedicated to climate change activist Greta Thunberg. This track contains lyrics such as "We are right now in the beginning of a climate and ecological crisis" and "now is not the time for speaking politely or focusing on what we can or cannot say. Now is the time to speak clearly." Some of these lyrics were taken directly from Thunberg's speeches or press releases.

== By genre ==
=== Blues and gospel ===
In the days of the African slave trade to the United States, the role of the environment was closely tied to spirituality and agricultural labor. Enslaved generations born in Africa passed down beliefs in divinity, superstition, and human connection to the natural world. "Africans believed in the interconnectedness of the human, spiritual, and environmental realms and felt that harm toward or care for one necessarily affected the others." These influences were expressed in the form of Spirituals or Gospel music and generally performed in either "praise houses" or in outdoor communion called "brush arbor meetings" or "bush meetings" This style of music was a way to authentically express the black experience in America, which in many ways meant reflecting on suffering. In reaction to this, references to heaven in gospel refer to it as a natural or pastoral landscape.

The Blues which came out of the south at the beginning of the 1900s spoke on the agrarian and impoverished lifestyles of the African American community. Firmly grounded in the realities of slavery and the systemic discrimination that followed, the Blues exemplified by artists like Roosevelt Charles was a reflection of rural labor and connection to the land. Later versions of the Blues shifted to faster tempos and themes of urban life as communities of colour migrated to cities like Chicago, Detroit, and New York. Some historians denote the dukes as an expression of reliance in the face of a continued struggle against white oppression. Thereby the Blues derived community amongst the minority in shared experience. Geographer Clyde Woods claims that citing artists like Robert Johnson that the Blues as well as Hip-Hop represent sustainability ethics by promoting the ‘co-operative rural and urban land forms’ through communities as sacred outside of their material value.

=== Modern classical music ===
While composers have often used nature as their inspiration, modern classical from the period since World War II has seen an ever increasing amount of music in this regard. Composers such as John Cage and Olivier Messiaen began using patterns in nature as their materials in musical composition. One example of Cage's use of environmental sounds is the piece "Child of Tree". This work involves amplifying a cactus and pea pod shakers in addition to other instruments chosen by the performer. John Luther Adams writes music directly from his surroundings in Alaska. He is an environmentalist who has written and discussed the role that artists can play in combating global warming. An example of his music is the piece The Place Where You Go to Listen. This work involves a sound and light installation that is "controlled by natural events occurring in real time."

=== Folk music ===
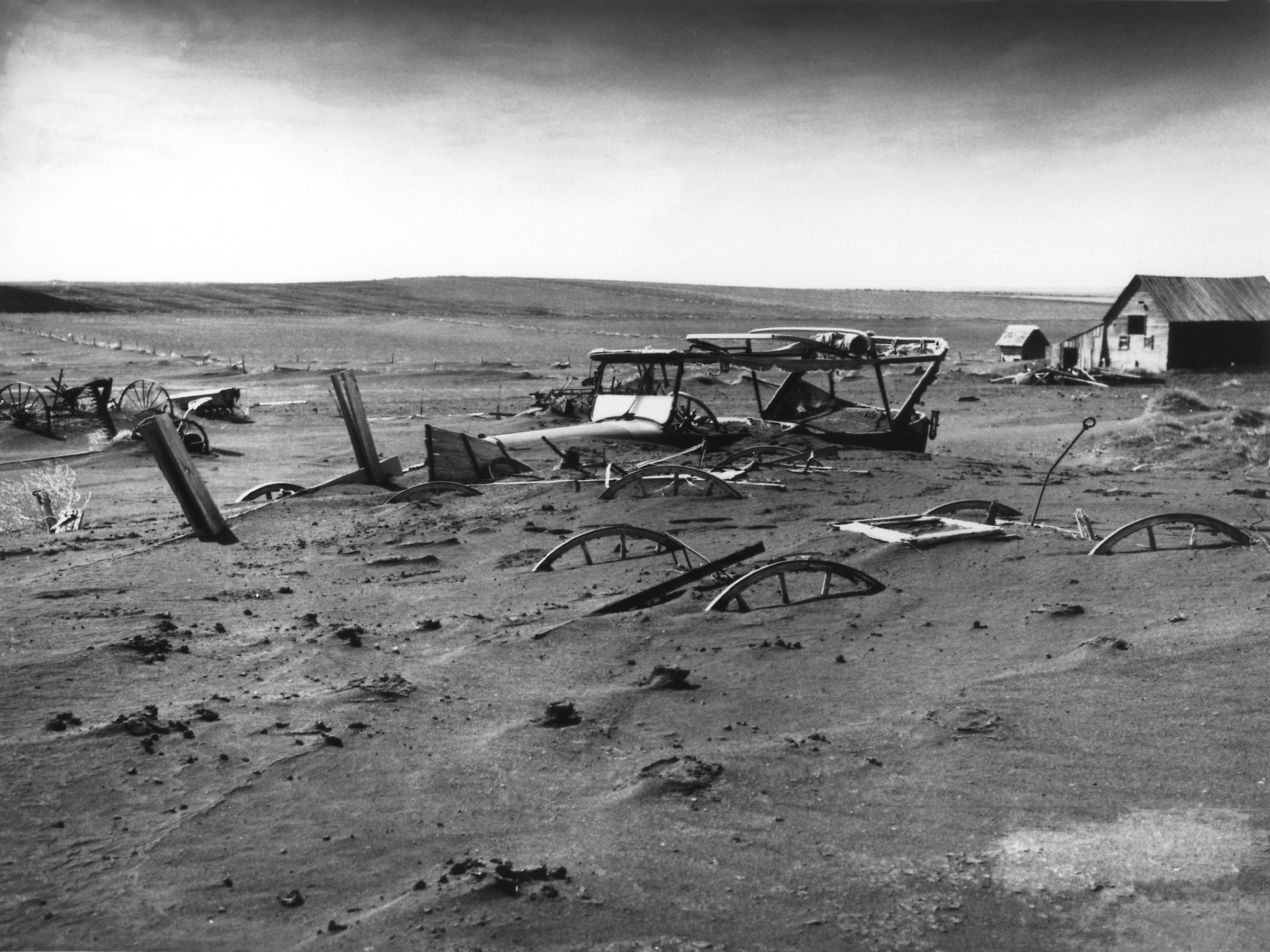
The North American Dust Bowl was a topic of some folk music of the 1930s and 1940s.

Folk music has had a considerable influence on the environmental movement. Richard Kahn wrote that folk's "populist spirit, tradition of protest rhetoric, and general reliance upon acoustic—and even homespun—instruments, many see folk music as the style that best fits and represents the environmental movement".

The first American environmental folk song is thought to be "Boll Weevil", which discussed the impact of boll weevils on America's cotton industry. During the beginnings of the American folk music revival, the impact of intensive agriculture on creating the Dust Bowl during the Great Depression was also a topic of numerous folk songs, such as Woody Guthrie's Dust Bowl Ballads and his prominent song "So Long It’s Been Good to Know Yuh". Guthrie and his collaborator Pete Seeger would go on to release numerous environmentally conscious songs and were involved in advocacy for reducing pollution in rivers. Malvina Reynolds released music on topics such as water conservation, the impact of the California freeway system and pollution. Joni Mitchell, Bob Dylan, John Denver and John Prine were all prominent advocates of environmental causes in their music and activism during the 1970s.

=== Hip-Hop and R&B ===
In the 1970s, along with grievances over the Vietnam War and Civil Rights activism, environmentalism was in the public eye as a political point of unrest. Within the African American community the transition into R&B emphasized the importance of these issues. Artist Marvin Gaye released an album in 1971 titled What's Going On wherein he criticizes the role of the United States in the Vietnam War, as well as the social and environmental degradation of inner city residences, particularly in "Mercy Mercy Me (The Ecology)".

The birth of hip-hop in the 1970s out of the primarily black, lower class communities in the South Bronx was also a reflection on issues related to race, poverty, violence, and injustice. Environmental hip-hop is an extension of the issues faced by communities of color. Artists like Mos Def in his song "New World Water", released in 1999, use the medium to break down the struggles in urban areas for some neighbourhoods to have access to clean water.

Groups like the Hip-Hop Caucus and Grind for the Green continue to promote increased advocacy for environmental issues in communities of color through the medium of Hip-Hop. These groups have found that using a platform like Hip Hop to engage youth resonates. Removing environmental injustice from academia and into oral performance historically better promotes shared experiences and shared interest. Malik Yusef and Lennox Yearwood have been involved in the People's Climate Movement, and have attempted to raise awareness of Hurricane Katrina and air pollution being environmental issues affecting black people.

=== Heavy metal ===
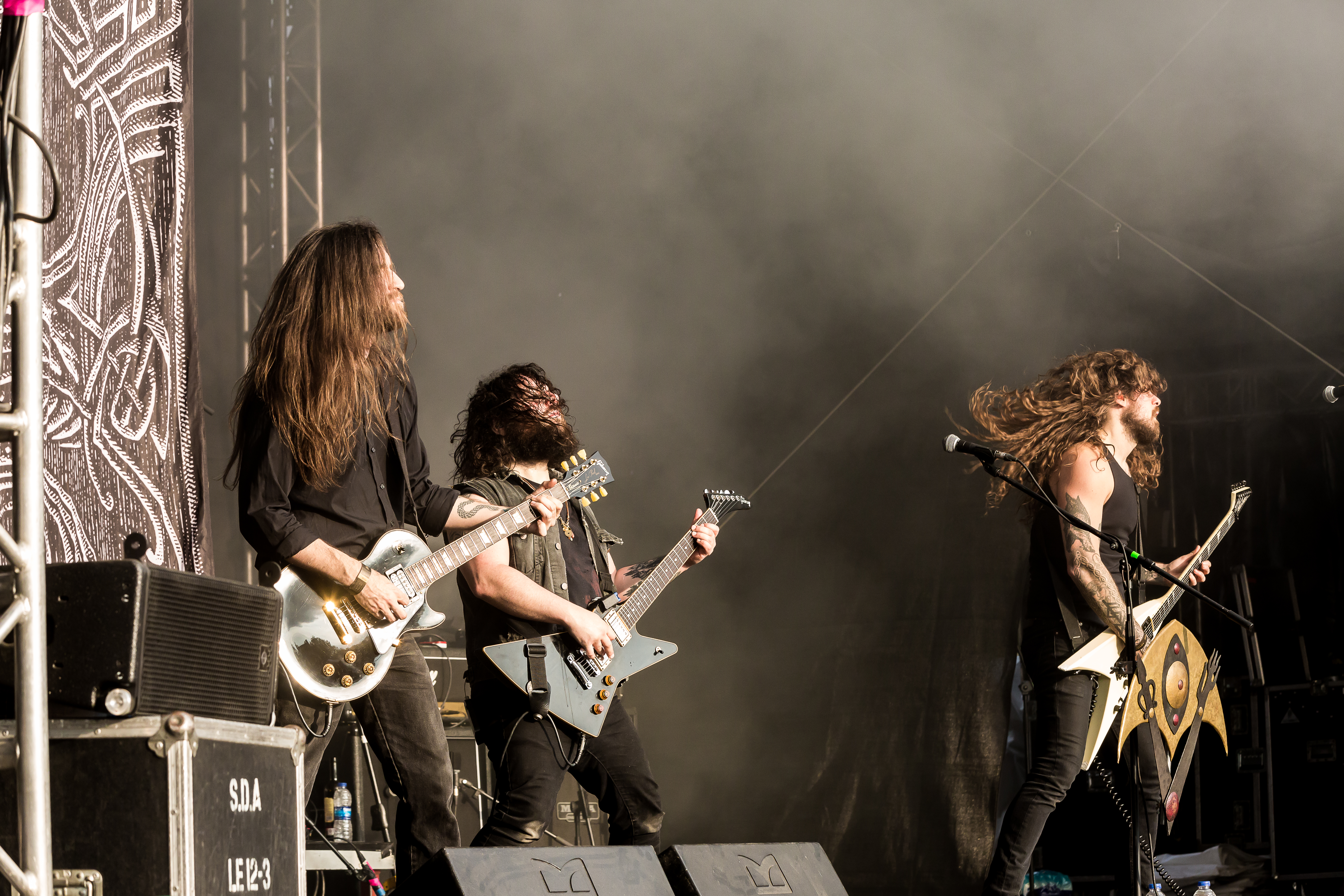
Wolves in the Throne Room, a black metal band who have often explored environmental themes

Heavy metal music has featured environmental themes, thought to be related to the genre's position as a countercultural style.

Thrash metal has addressed environmental topics since its origins in the 1980s, typically addressing them through dystopian themes. Metallica explored the theme for the first time on 1988 song "Blackened"., Nuclear Assault ("Critical Mass") and Testament ("Greenhouse Effect") both released their songs in 1989, and Megadeth ("Dawn Patrol") in 1990. Australian rock band King Gizzard & the Lizard Wizard released a climate change themed thrash metal album Infest the Rats' Nest in 2019.

Black metal, including its subgenre "eco-metal", has had a long tradition of focusing on nature and radical environmentalism, including groups Wolves in the Throne Room Botanist, Agalloch, Panopticon and Immortal.

French metal band Gojira and American deathgrind group Cattle Decapitation have also made environmental issues integral to their music and image, respectively exploring climate change and contemporary extinction on their albums From Mars to Sirius (2005) and The Anthropocene Extinction (2015).

Heavy metal bands in Indonesia have addressed local environmental issues. Brazilian metal band Sepultura have released songs discussing environmental issues in Brazil such as deforestation and climate change, and their song "Ambush" is a tribute to murdered environmental activist Chico Mendes.

In 2025 Papua New Guinea band Darkaside released the song "Decade of Crisis" addressing the Bougainville conflict which started in part due to uncontrolled pollution at the Panguna mine.

=== Punk rock ===
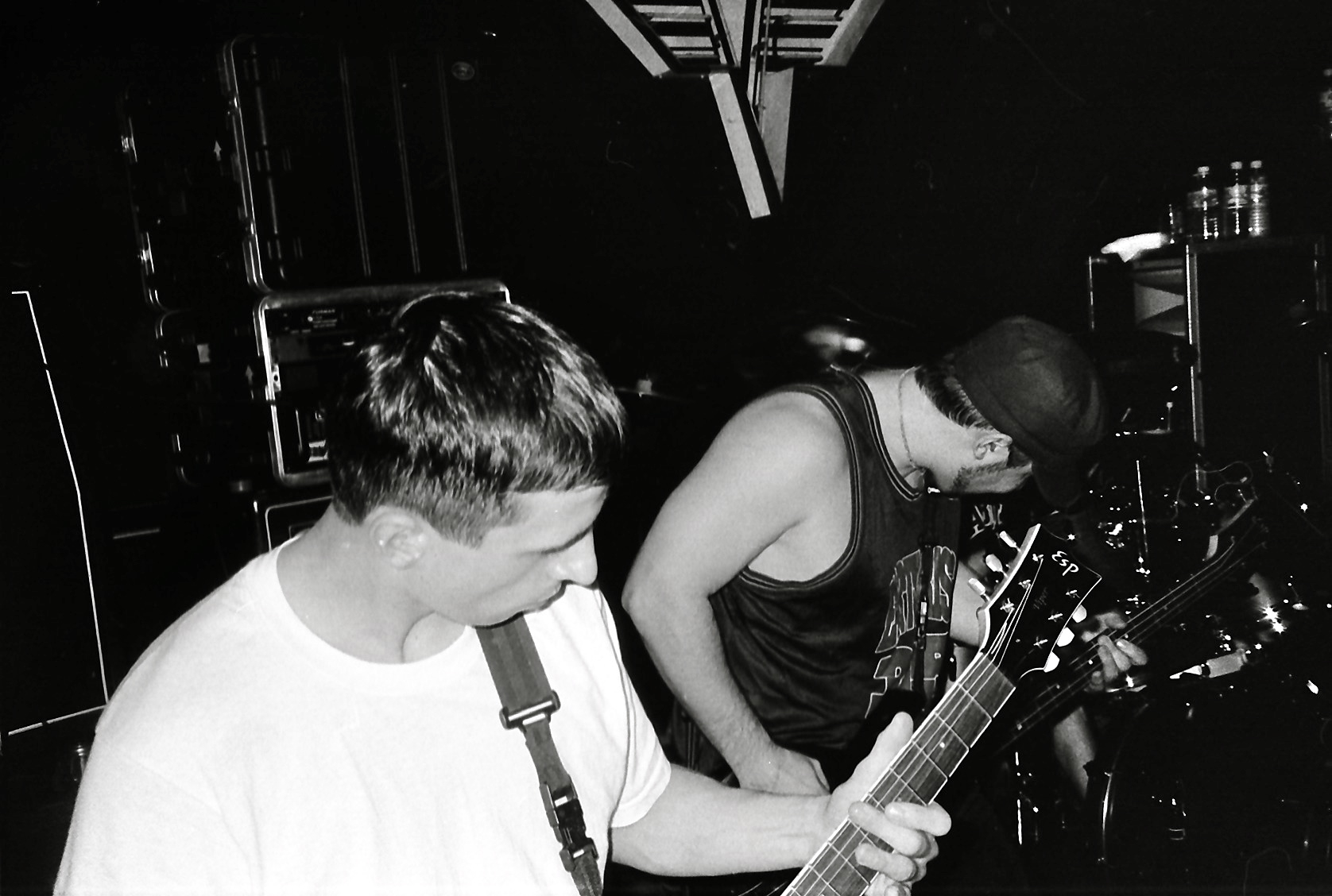
Straight edge hardcore punk group Earth Crisis performing in 1998

Punk rock is a genre with numerous political ideologies, including environmentalism. Poly Styrene and X-Ray Spex explored pollution on "The Day the World Turned Day-Glo", as did The Clash on "London Calling" and the Dead Kennedys on "Cesspools in Eden". In the 1990s, the movement of straight edge hardcore punk was associated with radical environmentalism and veganism, particularly groups like Earth Crisis and Vegan Reich. The hardline subculture that promotes biocentrism was spawned from straight edge hardcore punk, influenced by deep ecology.

== Advocacy and fundraising ==
Many artists have partnered with or supported environmental organisations financially or via awareness raising and have been directly involved in environmental activism and advocacy. This includes the Barenaked Ladies, Bonnie Raitt, Cloud Cult, Dave Matthews Band, Don Henley, Drake, Green Day, Guster, Jack Johnson, King Gizzard & the Lizard Wizard, KT Tunstall, Massive Attack, Metallica, Moby, Pearl Jam, Perry Farrell, Phish, Radiohead, The Roots, Sarah Harmer, Sheryl Crow, Thom Yorke, Willie Nelson, and many others.

In 2009, Björk and Sigur Rós streamed a free concert to raise the profile of opposition to the Kárahnjúkar Hydropower Plant over its environmental impact in their native Iceland. Greenpeace have worked with musicians throughout their history to promote environmental causes, including a series of 2015 "orchestral activism" protests against petroleum exploration in the Arctic. Marine conservation activist organisation Sea Shepherd have numerous high-profile supporters in the music industry that have financed their operations and vessels, including Rick Rubin, Anthony Kiedis, The Red Paintings and Gojira. During the 2019–20 Australian bushfire season, numerous musicians raised money for fire relief efforts and wildlife rescue operations, including three live albums released by King Gizzard & the Lizard Wizard.

A rock club in New York City called Wetlands Preserve served as both a performance venue and a hub for environmentalist activism from 1989 to 2001. The Baltic Sea Festival was founded on the theme of preserving the environment. Countries surrounding the Baltic Sea are brought together to solve problems with the body of water. Music "serves as a good platform" in discussions of solutions which can only be solved jointly.

== Sustainability ==
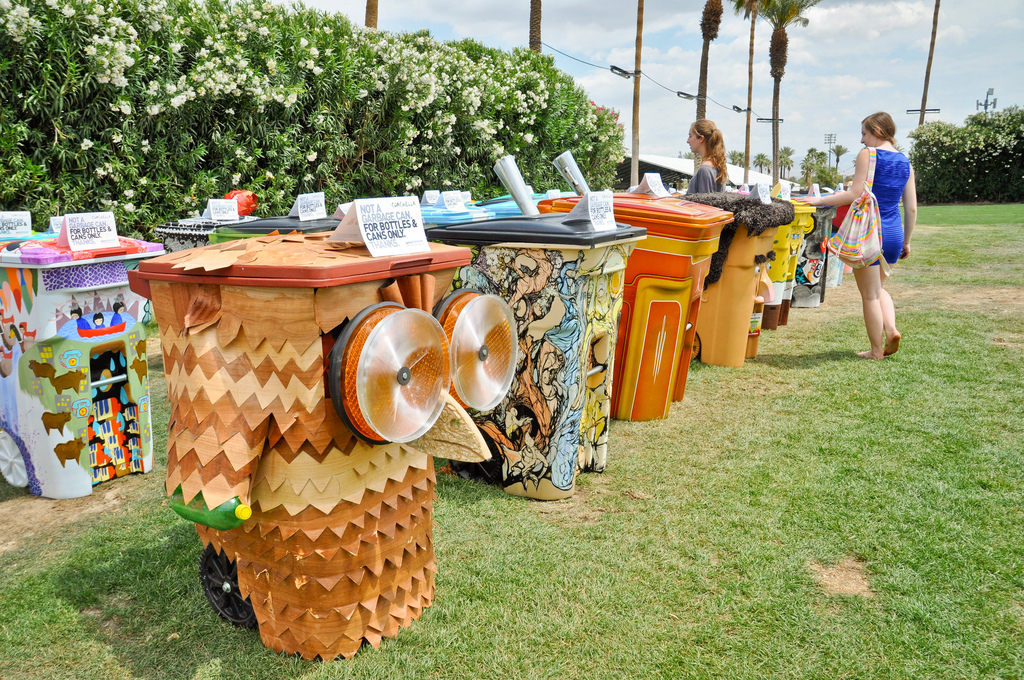
Artist-designed recycling bins at Coachella Valley Music and Arts Festival in California. The "TRASHed" initiative with Global Inheritance set out to encourage festivalgoers to recycle waste.

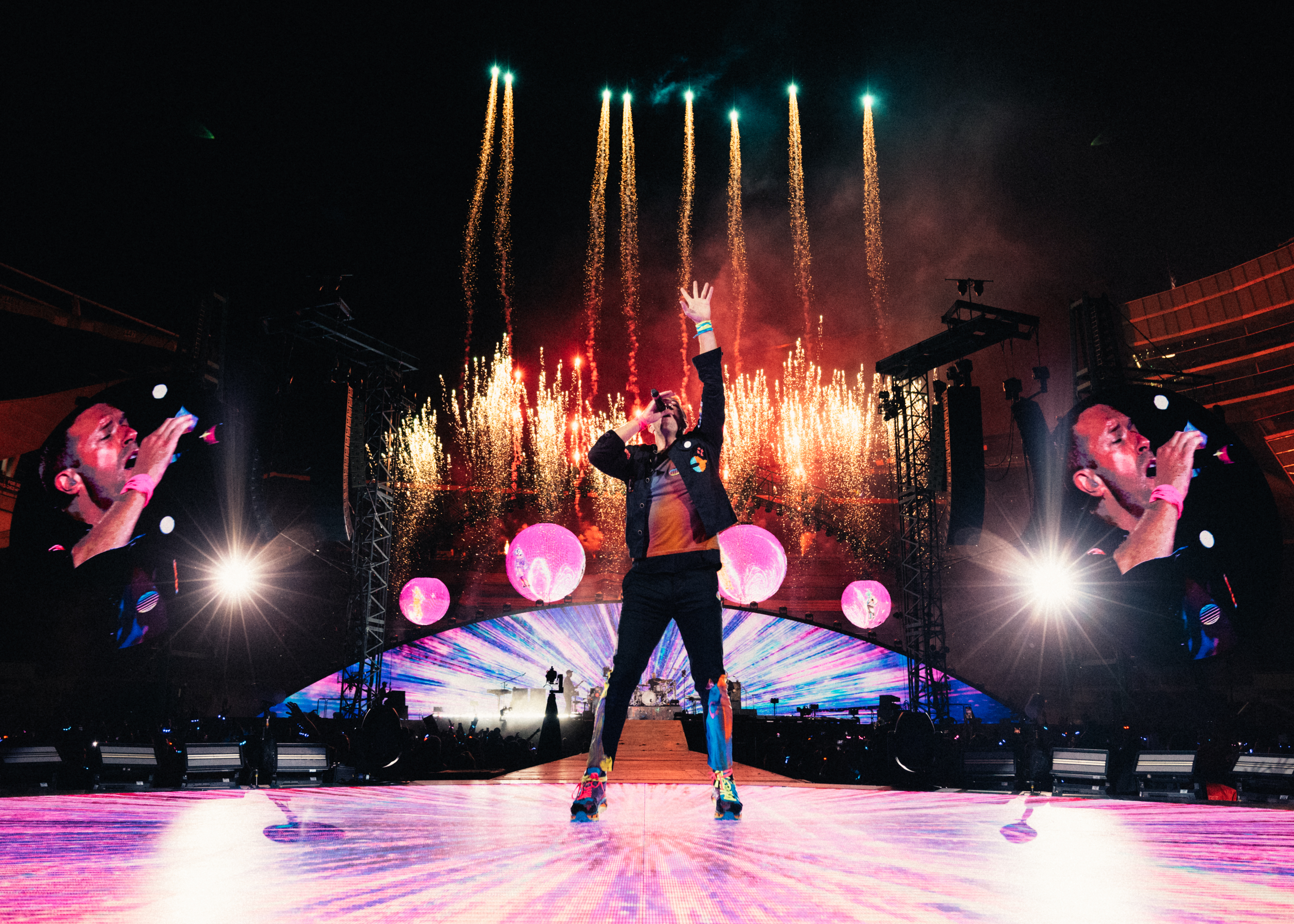
Coldplay's stage for Music of the Spheres World Tour was adapted to require less energy to function.

Given the prevalence of environmental advocacy in music, the environmental impact of various aspects of the music industry, particularly live music, has been scrutinised. Live music events like Live Earth that sought to raise awareness of climate change has attracted criticism over their own carbon footprint, particularly the environmental impact of flights taken by artists.

Some artists and industry bodies have made efforts to improve their own sustainability or reduce their carbon footprint. This includes music festivals like Bonnaroo, Coachella, and the Rainforest World Music Festival, and certain concert tours. Efforts have included using biodiesel for tour vehicles, carbon-offsetting, encouraging recycling and using biodegradable packaging at venues. Radiohead have shipped musical gear by freight rather than via air and Jack Johnson added solar panels and insulation to his studio to improve its energy efficiency. Massive Attack worked with the Tyndall Centre for Climate Change Research to explore hosting low-carbon live events.

Coldplay's Music of the Spheres World Tour set out to be as sustainable as possible and included recyclable batteries powered by renewable resources such as hydrotreated vegetable oil, solar power and kinetic energy. They utilized visual effects which required less explosive charge and new formulas to reduce harmful chemicals, while unavoidable emissions were offset according to Oxford's principles. The band also pledged to plant a tree for every ticket sold through One Tree Planted.

The format of music consumption also has an impact on its carbon footprint. On an hourly basis, streaming tends to release 55 grams of CO_{2}, whereas CDs are closer to 165, and vinyl and cassettes reach 2000.

== See also ==
- Music and politics
- Climate change in popular culture
- Ecomusicology
- Folk music
- Live Earth
- Protest song
- Rock for the Rainforest
- Woodstock
