= Flora Lake =

Lake in California, United States

- Location within California Location within the United States
- Location: Yosemite National Park, Tuolumne County, California, United States
- Coordinates: 38°03′00″N 119°48′26″W
- Basin countries: United States

Flora Lake is a remote lake located in the northern environs of Yosemite National Park, California, United States. The lake is located in a rugged environment that is only accessible to intrepid hikers.

The lake was once proposed as a cavalry outpost for the U.S. Army as it provided easy access to the northern border of Yosemite.

During the early 20th century the U.S. military was burdened with protecting the newly formed National Park System. Shortly after the park's creation, many wilderness outposts were created in order to curb the illegal intrusion of goat herds which shepherds would lead into the park. This activity routinely devastated otherwise pristine valleys.

Today the lake offers solitude and beauty that characterize those portions of northern Yosemite National Park and the adjacent Emigrant Wilderness.

== See also ==
- List of lakes in California
