= Hans von Flotow =

German diplomat

Hans Ludwig Carl Theodor von Flotow (10 September 1862 - 19 December 1935) was a high-level diplomat for the German Empire and Gutsherr (Lord of the manor).

== Life ==
=== Education and early career ===
Born at the family estate of Felsenhagen near Pritzwalk into the von Flotow family, a large noble family from Mecklenburg, his parents were manor owner Ludwig von Flotow and his wife Anna (née von Avemann). He attended the gymnasium in Wittstock and graduated from the Ritterakademie in Brandenburg on 31 March 1882, becoming friends with future Imperial Chancellor Bernhard von Bülow at the latter. Financially well off, he was then able to study law and political science at Heidelberg University and Berlin University from 1882 to 1886. From 1886 he trained as a senior officer in the Prussian civil service and - after completing his training and briefly working in Prussia's Finance Ministry - he joined its diplomatic service on 24 August 1892. He was trained in the Foreign Office in 1892/93 and then employed at various Imperial foreign missions and Prussian legations. He was legation secretary in Washington DC (1893-1895), Dresden (1895-1898) and The Hague (1898-1900), then secretary to the embassy in Vatican City (1900-1904), counsellor in Paris (1904-1907) and head of the personal staff at the Foreign Office in Berlin (1907-1910).

=== Belgium ===
In January 1910 he succeeded Nikolaus von Wallwitz as ambassador to Belgium, holding office until himself being succeeded by Claus von Below-Saleske in 1913. In Berlin on 20 September 1910 he married Marie, Countess von Keller, a Russian woman and the widow of a general (née Princess Schachowsky; 1861–1944), but the marriage proved unhappy and they divorced in 1916. In his memoirs (published posthumously in 1930) von Bülow accused von Flotow of homosexuality but this was probably not the case. He worked towards German-French relations during the Moroccan crises, in recognition of which he was made a Grand Cross of the Legion d'Honneur.

=== Italy ===
On 15 February 1913 he was made Germany's ambassador to Italy in Rome, since the previous appointee Martin Rücker von Jenisch had resigned on health grounds - the role had been vacant since 11 January 1913, when Gottlieb von Jagow had been made the new German Foreign Minister. Von Flotow nominally remained in this post until Italy entered the First World War on the Allied side and broke off diplomatic relations with Germany on 23 May 1915, though in practice he had been superseded by von Bülow on the latter's appointment as "special ambassador" on 14 December 1914. Von Bülow boasted he would be able to convince Italy not to enter the war against Austro-Hungary and Germany, but proved unable to do so. Von Flotow contributed an essay on von Bülow's role in Rome to Dr. Friedrich Thimme's 1931 anthology "Front wider Bülow", correcting some of the historical errors and lies in von Bülow's memoirs, but not defending himself against von Bülow's accusations of homosexuality.

=== Return ===
Ill and tired, from early 1915 von Flotow moved to his Altenhof estate in the Grand Duchy of Mecklenburg-Schwerin, though he remained a temporary diplomat until his full retirement on 1 January 1928. He was there cared for by a niece, who he later adopted as his daughter and made his heir, though no written will by him survives. He was a member of the German Men's Club and his distant relations included Ludwig Freiherr von Flotow (1867–1948), Austro-Hungary's last Foreign Minister, and Friedrich von Flotow (1812–1883), composer and director of the Hoftheater in Schwerin. He died in Berlin.
