= Flora, Ohio =

Coordinates: 39°09′53″N 81°58′42″W

Flora is an extinct town in Meigs County, in the U.S. state of Ohio. The GNIS classifies it as a populated place.

== History ==
A post office was established at Flora in 1884, and remained in operation until 1949. An early settler gave the community the name of his daughter Flora.
