= Flora (film) =

2017 Canadian science fiction horror film written and directed by Sasha Louis Vukovic

- Theatrical Release Poster
- Directed by: Sasha Louis Vukovic
- Screenplay by: Sasha Louis Vukovic
- Produced by: Sasha Louis Vukovic
- Starring: Sari Mercer; Teresa Marie Doran; Caleb Noel; Dan Lin; Miles G. Jackson; William Aaron
- Cinematography: Eric Irvin
- Edited by: Erica Gulliver
- Music by: Nathan Prillaman
- Production company: Pulp Pictures
- Distributed by: Mill Creek Entertainment
- Release date: April 29, 2017 (Sci-Fi-London)
- Running time: 105 minutes
- Country: Canada
- Language: English
- Budget: $100,000

Flora is a 2017 Canadian independent science fiction thriller and historical drama written and directed by Sasha Louis Vukovic. He sought to "make a movie which is not about a bunch of kids running from a horrible slasher". The film follows a group of students on a university botany expedition as they try to survive and avoid exposure to an unknown pathogen.

The film is Sasha Louis Vukovic's directorial debut and appeared at several film festivals worldwide.

== Plot ==
In the spring of 1929, a team of student botanists arrive in an uncharted forest somewhere in North America on expedition to chart the native flora. The students arrive to find their professor absent and their food supplies destroyed. After a day of waiting for his return, they begin a search to find the missing professor. The professor is found deceased, wearing a gas mask, at a nearby abandoned mining town. Gradually, some of the students begin falling ill to an unknown pathogen.

The professor's protégé, Matsudaira Basho, Matt to the other students, is able to deduce from the complete absence of animal life in the region that the pathogen may be an endophyte present in the local plant life and transmitted by consumption of plants or through inhalation of pollen. In light of the lack of food supplies, the students embark on a trek through the forest to reach a railway where they might be able to rendezvous with a monthly train that is scheduled to pass by in several days' time. The students prepare foods from local plant material by boiling the harvest in order to render them non-pathogenic and create biohazard suits with gas masks to prevent infection.

Along the journey, the students begin to fall ill to the pathogen. The survivors notice a pine forest in the distance from an overlook and identify that pine needles carry an antigen that may protect them from the other local plant life. As they make their way to the forest, Avis, the team's nurse, falls behind and collapses due to a hole in her breathing apparatus. Matt notices this and returns to her, but this separates him from Ora and Haviland, the only other remaining members of the team. Haviland convinces Ora to push forward to the forest in the hope that Matt will find them there.

Matt meanwhile stumbles into an area filled with hammocks and meets a little girl. Both turn out to be hallucinations. Matt also hallucinates other deceased members of the team. Ora and Haviland hear him blowing his whistle and Haviland sets out to find him, forcing Ora to stay as he knows she's exhausted. He promises to be back by morning and he appears shortly after she wakes, carrying Matt. Haviland is maskless, having given his to Matt who he discovered without one. He passes and Ora nurses Matt back to health and they set out again, having lost a day. Matt stops and takes his mask off, but forces Ora to keep hers on. He reveals he is staying, as he knows he is slowing her down and she now has only two days to reach the train. She protests but he is able to convince her that she must survive to get back to the university and return with help, so that they are able to study and then understand this organism.

Ora continues on foot alone. She arrives at the railway and collapses. Waking up, she takes off her mask and hears the train coming.

== Production ==
The film was privately funded by Vukovic’s family and friends, with a micro-budget estimated at $100,000 USD (or $120,000 CAD). Despite a budget of only $2000 for props, Vukovic was able to obtain props appropriate to the 1920s through eBay and a Canadian historian, Alan Skeoch. One of Vukovik's family members owns a 1931 Ford A Tudor which was featured in the opening of the film. Several of the cast members also participated in other aspects of the production, for example with Doran both playing the character Ora and leading Art Direction.

Principal photography was carried out over six weeks from June 29 through August 16, 2015. Post-production was completed on October 1, 2016. Filming was performed in Val-Jalbert, a preserved ghost town in Québec, as well as Ottawa and Manitoulin Island in Ontario. Post-production was performed at Eggplant Picture & Sound in Toronto and completed on October 1, 2016.

== Release ==
Flora premiered at Sci-Fi-London on April 29, 2017 and was submitted to 70 festivals around the world.

The film was released on Blu-Ray on August 7, 2018.

== Reception ==
The screenplay for Flora, written by Sasha Vukovic, won the 2015 Van Gogh Award in the Feature Screenplay Competition. The film was praised as "a refreshing take on the ‘monster-in-the-woods’ canon" and received the Sci-Fi-London festival award for Best Feature 2017.

Other awards include the 2017 Van Gogh Cinematic Vision Award from the Amsterdam Film Festival; five awards including Best Science Fiction Feature at the Miami International Science Fiction Film Festival; The 2018 Museum of Science Fiction Maria Award for Excellence for Best Feature and Best Acting at Escape Velocity Film Festival; and the 2017 award for Best Score at FilmQuest.

Many critics have noted the film's quality despite the extremely low budget on which it was produced. It has been compared with The Happening, and described as being atypical of the typical "nature's revenge" horror scenario. Vukovik has stated that the film is "science fact more than it is science fiction".
