= Flot =

Flot or FLOT may refer to:

- Forward Line of Own Troops, a technical expression for a military front line
- Flot., taxonomic author abbreviation of Julius von Flotow (1788–1856), German botanist specialized in lichenology and bryology
- A chemotherapy regimen.

== See also ==
- First law of thermodynamics
