= Floto =

American leather company

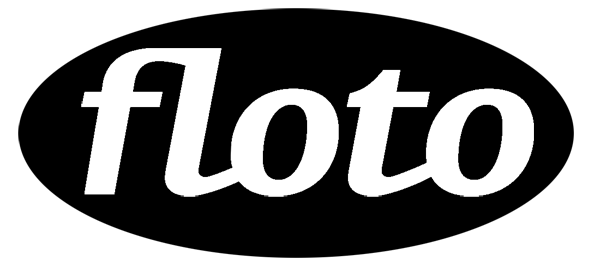
- Company type: Privately held company
- Industry: Bags
- Founded: 2003; 23 years ago
- Headquarters: Bridgeport, Connecticut, United States
- Products: Travel bags, Briefcase, Handbags
- Website: www.flotoimports.com

Floto is an American brand that manufactures and markets Italian leather travel bags, briefcases, handbags and accessories.

Bags are sold to consumers through the company's website, online retailers, and small boutique stores. In 2008, Floto products were covered in New York Magazine, and in 2012 in Luxist, and Kempt.

== History ==
The company was founded by Joe Floto in 2003. He first made bags in his apartment in the West Village of New York City based on a bag he brought back from Italy.

Floto moved to its headquartered in Bridgeport, Connecticut from where it imports and distributes goods manufactured in Florence, Italy.

== Awards ==
- Best Online Portals for Italian Leather Goods by TheTopTens.com.
