= Ecomusicology =

Study of music as it relates to nature

Ecomusicology is an area of study that explores the relationships between music or sound and the natural environment. It is a study which encompasses a variety of academic disciplines, including musicology, biology, ecology and anthropology. Ecomusicology combines these disciplines to explore how sound is produced by natural environments and, more broadly, how cultural values and concerns about nature are expressed through sonic mediums. Ecomusicology explores the ways that music is composed to replicate natural imagery, as well as how sounds produced within the natural environment are used within musical composition. Ecological studies of sounds produced by animals within their habitat are also considered to be part of the field of ecomusicology. In the 21st century, studies within the field of ecomusicology have also become increasingly interested in the sustainability of music production and performance.

Ecomusicology is concerned with the study of music, culture, and nature, and considers musical and sonic issues, both textual and performative, related to ecology and the natural environment. It is, in essence, a mixture of ecocriticism and musicology (rather than "ecology" and "musicology"), in Charles Seeger's holistic definition. Ecomusicology is regarded as a field of research rather than a specific academic discipline. Because ecomusicology focuses on a vast variety of disciplines as well as areas of research, it can be imagined as a space in which studies of sound in relation with the environment are conducted.

Ecomusicology's relevance to such a wide range of other research areas is exactly what makes it somewhat ambiguous to define. On one hand, ecomusicology is a unique field of research which helps to make connections between a variety of music-related and environmental studies. Yet, by functioning as a collective term, it is often difficult to frame ecomusicology within a static set of descriptive definitions. Musicologist Aaron S. Allen, the author of multiple published works on ecomusicology, defines ecomusicology as "the study of music, culture, and nature in all the complexities of those terms. Ecomusicology considers musical and sonic issues, both textual and performative, related to ecology and the natural environment."

== Background ==
Ecomusicology as a field of study is often traced back to musical composer and environmentalist R. Murray Schafer who used the term to explain the sonic nature of particular physical environments or soundscapes. The idea of sound or music as something which creates or captures a particular atmosphere was initially professed by Murray R. Schafer through his development of the concept of soundscape ecology in the late 1970s. Schafer used this term to encompass the vast acoustic environment which constitutes all the varied sounds audible to the human ear. A soundscape might entail, for example, all audible sounds heard within a specific area of land, such as a mountain range, a forest or a field.

From the 1970s, there has been an increase in interest in the term ecomusicology, which was established as a term in the early 21st century in North American and Scandinavian circles. As a field, ecomusicology was created out of a common area of interest between the fields of ecocriticism and musicology, expressed by a range of scholars and artists such as composers, acoustic ecologists, ethnomusicologists, biomusicologists, and others.

Ecomusicology embraces what is today considered the field of historical musicology, ethnomusicology, and related interdisciplinary fields, which, while at the same time enabling specialists within each of these fields to interact with academics in the other fields in their approach, also provides individuals with flexibility to approach an ecocritical study of music through a variety of disciplines and fields.

In 2011, the Society for Ethnomusicology established an Ecomusicology Special Interest Group (ESIG).

In October 2012, the first international ecomusicology conference took place in New Orleans, U.S.

== Sustainability and environmental ethics ==
Ecomusicology considers aspects of environmental sustainability within music production and performance. For example, the relationship between the demand for a certain musical instrument as well as the costs and impacts of its production has been an area of interest for Ecomusicologists investigating the sustainability of the consumption and production of music or musical instruments. This includes the impact which the demand for musical instruments, merchandise or live experiences such as concerts has on the natural environment. Music-Journalist and Anthropologist Mark Pedelty, has written on the Ecomusicological relationship between human musical activities and the health of the environment. Having written about the pollutive impacts that international music touring often has on the environment, Pedelty explores Ecomusicological concerns of ethicality regarding the production of carbon emissions created by vehicles used to a move band members, instruments and/or any extensive staging or crew.

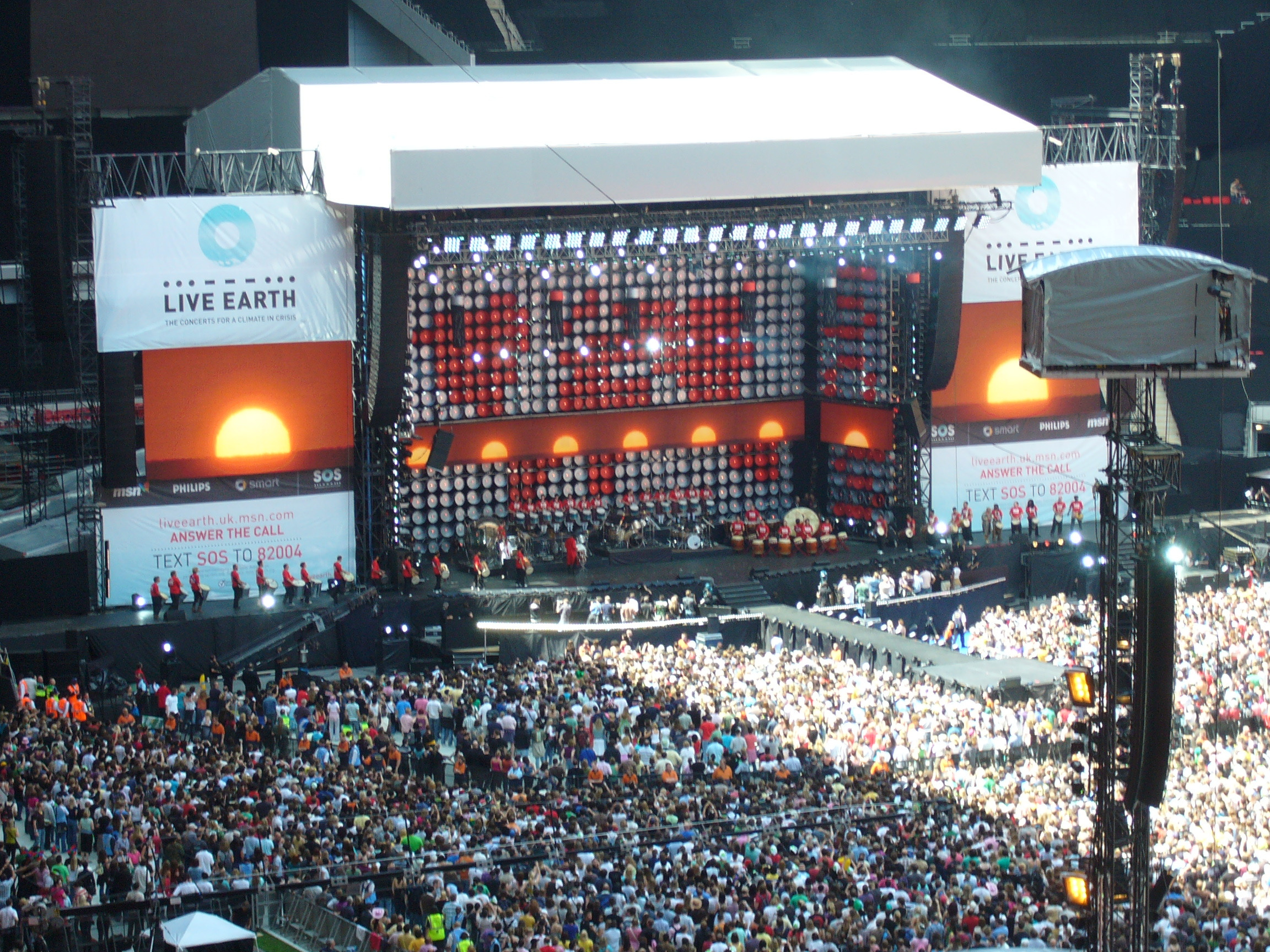
Live Earth Concert at Wembley Stadium, 2007

Part of ecomusicology's investigation of environmental ethics, is the ways in which discussions around projects of sustainability are positioned within popular music and media. In 2010, music magazine Rolling Stone compiled a list of "The 15 Most Eco-Friendly Rockers", selecting artists based on various criteria regarding their support or consideration for the environment within their musical practice. This included assessments of the amount of money donated to environmentally sustainable causes, or an artist's effort to perform and act in carbon-neutral ways. Some of the artists included Green Day for their work with the Natural Resources Defence Council, as well as hip-hop group The Roots for hosting multiple music events aimed at promoting social and environmental awareness.

== Environmental activism and ecocriticism ==
A key area of focus for studies within ecomusicology is the ways in which sound and music are used to create or express concerns about the environment. Jeff Todd Titon has described ecomusicology, which focuses more on conceptual aspects of ecocriticism as "the study of music, culture, sound and nature in a period of environmental crisis." The occurrence of live music events aimed at promoting awareness about environmental destruction and climate change is one area in which ecomusicology continues to be engaged.

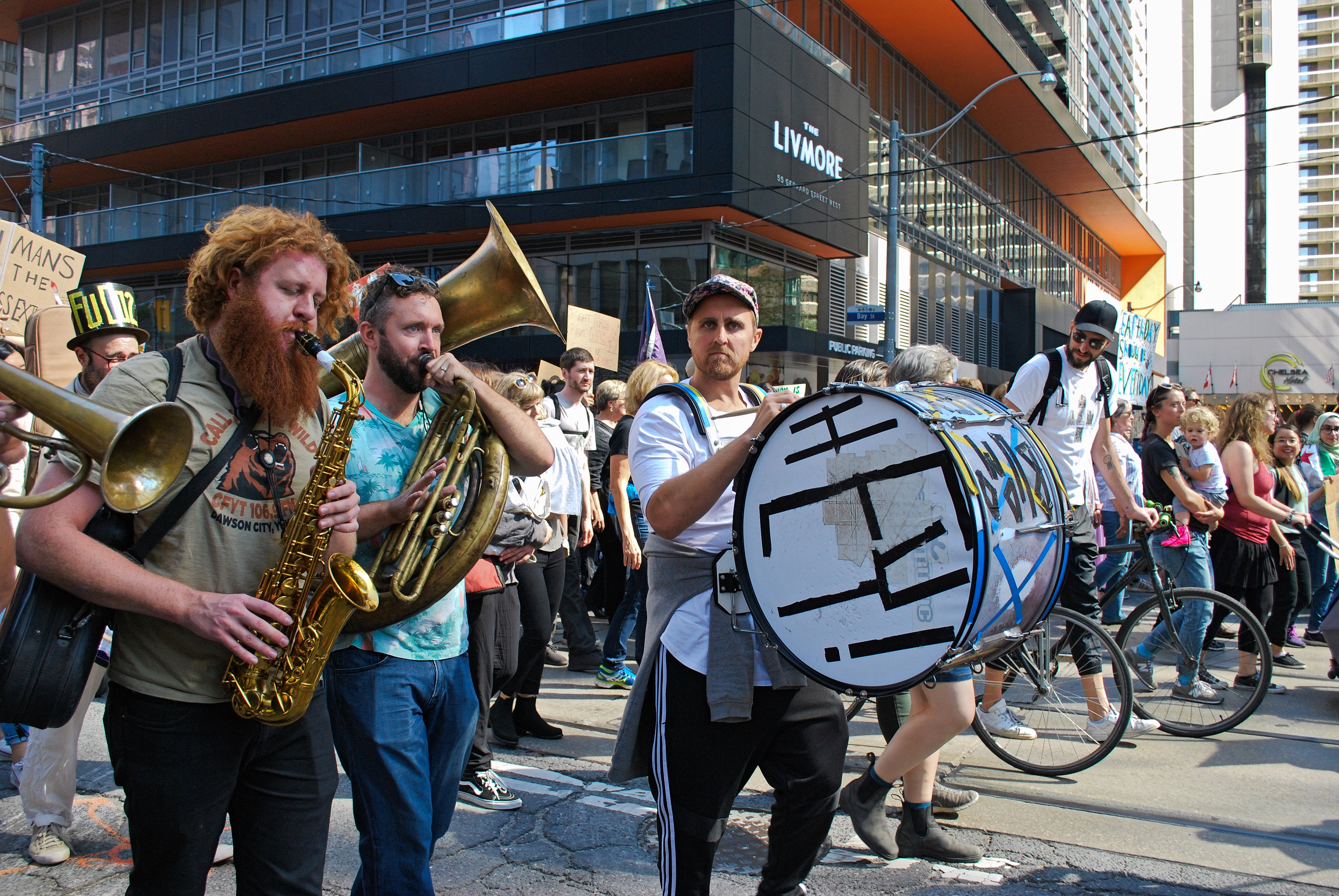
Marching band at Climate Strike in Toronto, 27 September 2019

Numerous music events including Live Earth in 2007 and, more recently, Make It Rain (Australia, 2020) among others, have either been involved in promoting climate-change awareness, or to raising funds for the alleviation of the effects of climate change on humans and animals. The investigation of eco-friendly organisations such as Reverb is also relevant to Ecomusicological inquiry. These organisations are often aimed at working with artists to reduce or offset the carbon footprint of their performance and touring emissions, as well as engaging audiences in environmental activism by reducing waste production at music events.

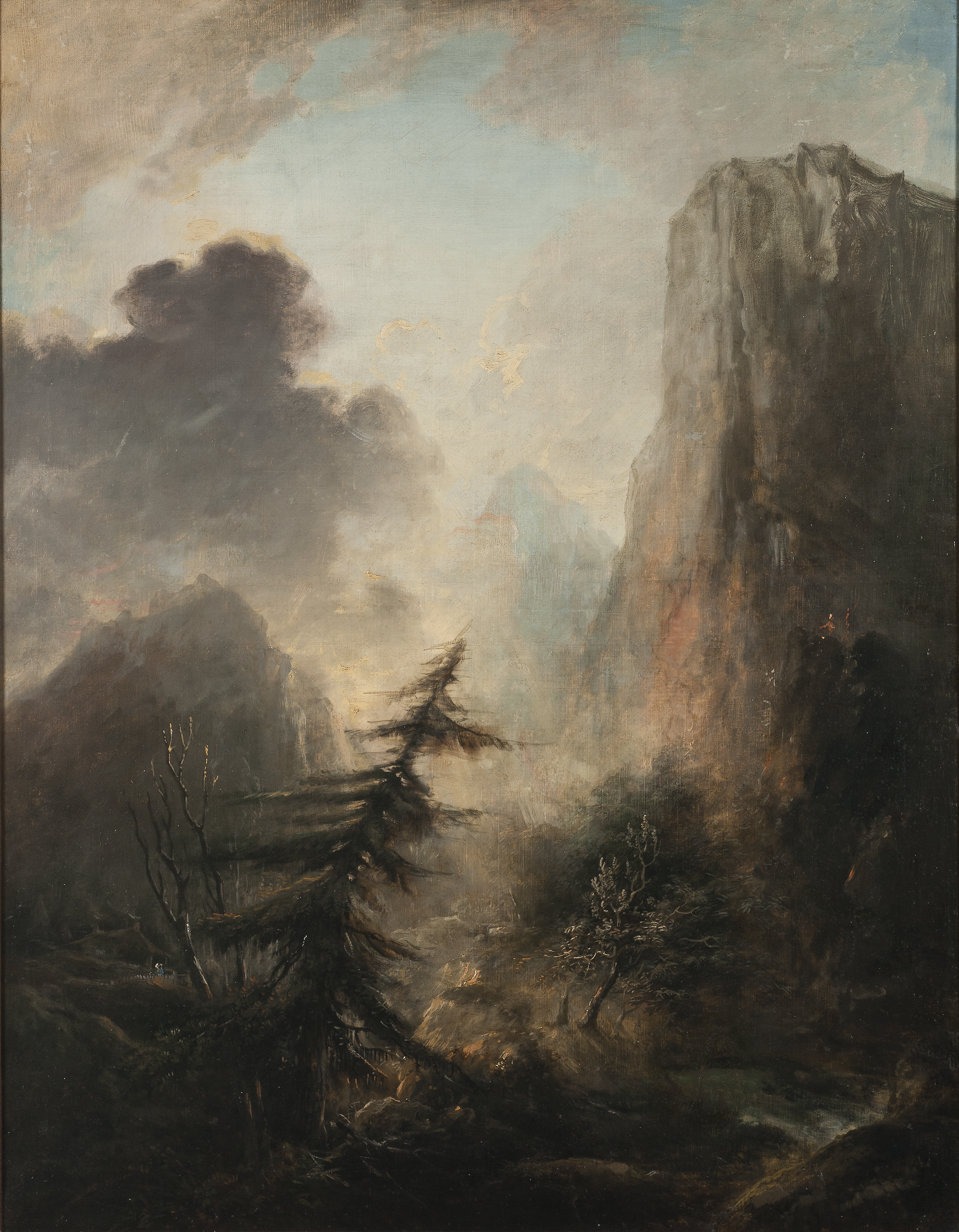
Romantic Landscape with Spruce (Elias Martin) – National museum – 21679

Ecomusicology also considers the relationships between music or sound, and the promotion of ideas surrounding environmental activism. Ecomusicologists may for example examine the conceptual basis of songs written specifically about environmental degradation or, consider how and to what effect the use of simple short, repetitive vocal chants may assist in voicing the environmental concerns central to projects of climate activism. The ways in which music has been used to prompt social and political action to protect the environment is of notable relevance to the focuses of ecomusicology at large.

=== Representations of the natural world ===
Ecomusicology investigates the creation of music which attempts to reflect or capture feelings or experiences provoked by the natural environment. Experiences of nature which are often expressed through poetry or art, are frequently analysed within ecomusicology to identify the cognitive and emotional impacts which specific sounds might have on humans.

== Ecology ==
Ecomusicology is often closely paired with the study of ecology, assisting in the analysis of the behavioural patterns of animals and ecosystems through the investigation of sound data. Ecological studies of bird and the characteristics of their song, have revealed ways in which sounds and spaces in their natural environment have shaped certain behaviours. Here, ecomusicology applies concepts related to sound and music theory with research regarding animal behaviours to reveal information about how sound is manipulated by animals in relation to their environment.

By measuring musicological qualities such as volume, pitch and frequency within a particular bird's song, Ecologists have discovered that certain birds will sing louder in noisier, built-environments compared to birds of the same species found in rural environments. Similarly, some birds may pitch their song differently in order to be heard across greater distances or more densely vegetative, and therefore more sound-absorbent environments. Other ecological studies on non-human animals include research on whale vocalization as well as the acoustics of bat and insect communication otherwise known as biophonics.

== Research methods ==
Ecomusicology utilises both qualitative and quantitative methods of data collection, however, the type of data as well as methods of data collection vary depending on what the subject of study may be. Ecomusicological research aimed at understanding aspects of social engagement with ecocritism might for example primarily involve the use of qualitative data collected through interviews and field research of particular social events. Conversely, research regarding the communicative behaviours of certain animal species would likely be pursued through a comparison of quantitative data collected through audio recordings of a specific environment.

=== Environment-focused ===
Ecomusicological field research of animal behaviours within a particular environment often includes methods of passive recording/listening. This is usually undertaken with the use of multi-directional Microphone which are often hidden and left within a species' habitat to record the array of sounds created in its environment. Hydrophones (microphones that can be submerged beneath water) may also be used to collect sound data from marine environments. By replaying passive (data collected without being present at the source) recordings, Ecologists are able to study the amount, frequency and variation of a particular sound within that environment to reveal insights about the population or behaviours of a particular animal species.

=== Human-focused ===
Human-focused studies in ecomusicology are often conducted using similar field research methods to that of anthropology or sociology. This includes conducting interviews, collecting various numerical data, surveys as well as on-site observation. There are three main ways in which the study of non-humans enhances the study of human music: the context of the non-human's sound, the agency or behavior of the non-human, and the interaction between the human and non-human. As an example of contextualizing a non-human's sound, study of the peacock's call altered the interpretation of northeastern Brazilian folklore; works about the peacock were interpreted as love songs until better understanding of this particular call elucidated that it was resistance to the military dictatorship in Brazil. Studying agency includes the relationship that humans have with animal behavior; migratory patterns of the Picazuro pigeon predicted major droughts, demonstrating the interconnectedness of rural and urban communities through nature. Finally, the study of human and non-human interaction focuses on the manner in which humans interpret the sounds of nonhumans. Luis Gonzaga, a popular Brazilian singer, popularized a folk song about the laughing falcon, which many used to understand the birds' call as an indicator of major drought. These varied methods of data collection are used to make a qualitative analysis of the ways in which sound and music may influence behaviours as well as systems of value and meaning within a particular social context.

The idea of "place" has also served as a common theme of human-focused ecomusicological research. Having worked with the Kaluli people in Papua New Guinea, ethnomusicologist Steven Feld studied the confluence of myth and ecology in Kaluli aesthetics reflected in weeping, poetics, and sound. According to Feld, for the Kaluli, sound, as a system of symbols, functions as a way of communicating deeply felt sentiments and reconfiguring mythic principles. The form and performance of Kaluli weeping, poetics, and song, tied to Kaluli origin myths and the natural environment, embody and express cultural meanings. Using sound as an expressive, performative modality, the Kaluli signify the symbolic circle of their myth, "the boy who became a muni bird." Feld's analysis suggests that this theme of "becoming a bird" serves as a core metaphor of Kaluli aesthetics that "mediat[es] social sentiments in sound forms." Culturally constituted performance codes confer performers with the ability to symbolize bird communication. Kaluli aesthetics elicit comparisons between performers and certain birds of the natural environment in the Southern Highlands Province of Papua New Guinea. Through his research, Feld theorized the concept of acoustemology (sound as a way of knowing) by analyzing how acoustics and epistemology conjoin.

== Musical theory and instrumentation ==
Ecomusicology considers the ways in which musical instruments and other forms of sound manipulation are used to recreate or represent features of specific environments or soundscapes. Music produced within the conceptual spectrum of ecomusicology often tries to replicate sounds found in the natural environment. This can include the use of orchestral instruments or vocal sounds to mimic sounds produced within the natural environment, such as the melodic chirp of a bird's song, or the rhythmic gushing of stream. Sound effects are also used in a variety of ways to recreate sound textures produced within particular environments. An example might be the application of echo or reverb effects to an instrument to reproduce the distant echoing of sound as it rebounds off hard surfaces across a canyon or valley.

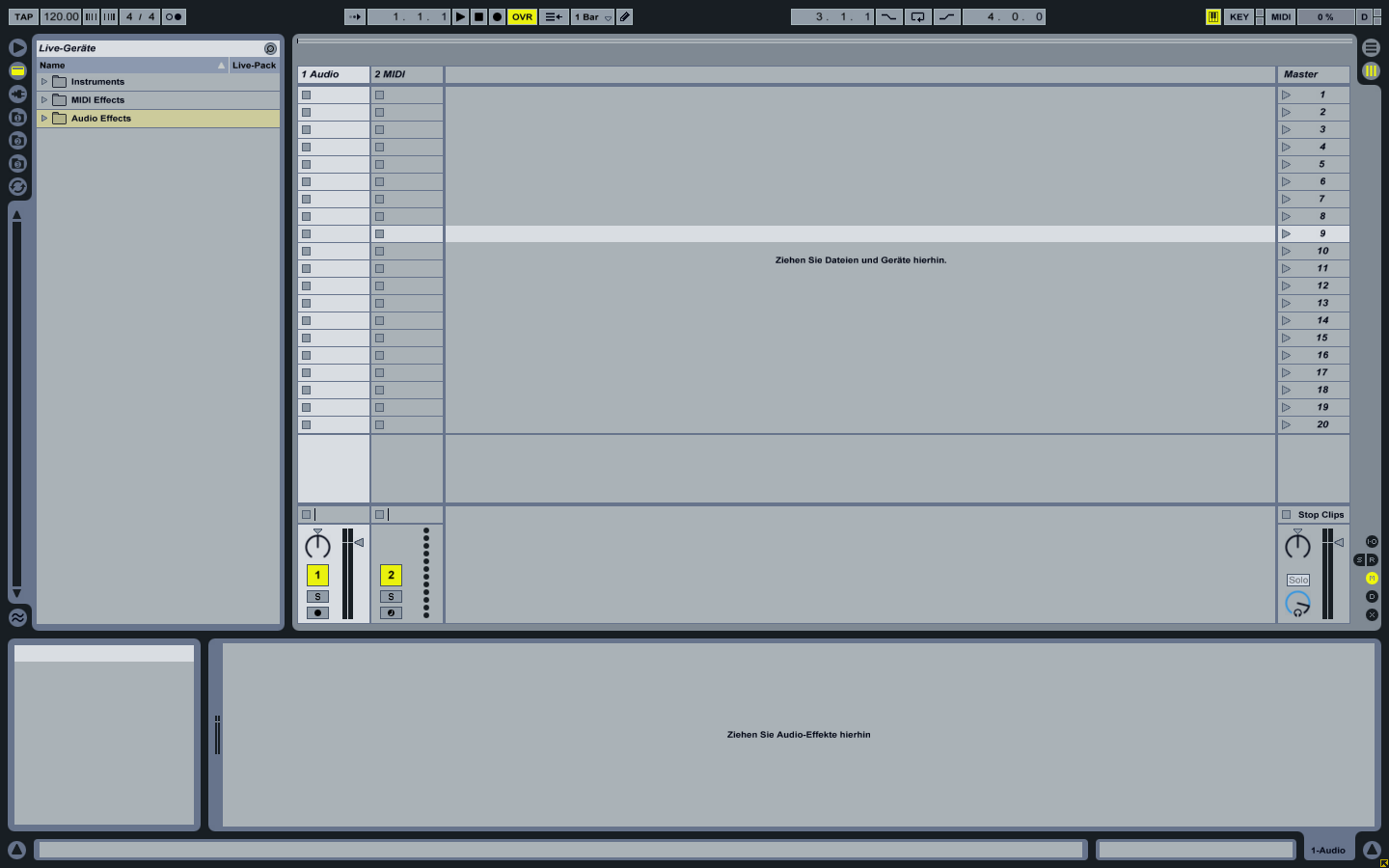
A screen of music production software Ableton Live

The work of composer and sound-artist Maggi Payne often features the creation and combination of different sounds to convey natural processes or reflect elements of the natural environment. In her sound work Distant Thunder, Payne uses a combination of different sound sources including "boiling water, a resonant floor furnace, and unrolling adhesive tape" to recreate the distinctive soundscape of desert storm.

A common feature of musical compositions related to ecomusicology, is the use of field recordings that capture the ambient sound produced within a specific environment. Field recordings can originate from urban settings to rural or natural environments, or anywhere else where an audio recording device may be used to record the sounds produced within a particular location. The creation and use of field recordings form part of ecomusicology's analysis of soundscapes and the ways in which different environments may be experienced through their distinctive aural features.

Also of interest to studies within ecomusicology, are the ways in which sound is processed and manipulated through technological software to compose new soundscapes or sound environments. Musical composition methods which involve music production software has allowed for music's relationship with nature to be imagined in new ways, many of which are useful and relevant to ecomusicological analysis.

== Education ==
Since its increased presence within academic discourse in the 21st century, a number of teaching methods have been devised to integrate the study of ecomusicology into school learning environments. Daniel J. Shevock, an academic of musicology who has written extensively on Ecomusicological theory, has designed and taught a variety of lessons concerning ideas and practices of ecomusicology which can be applied to primary/highschool learning environments.

Shevock has outlined a series of possible practice-based learning activities focused on informing students about environmental concerns central to the study of ecomusicology. This includes tasks which involve the creation of songs or poems inspired by the natural environment or other social concerns about sustainability and the health of ecologies. Shevock has also devised a range of theoretical tasks which include listening to and discussing the conceptual and structural elements of nature-focused music.

As a field of study which encompasses more than one area of interest, both Allen and Shevock have discussed the potential advantages that studies of ecomusicology might have in extending an understanding of other subject areas taught within schools. For example, the teaching of some of ecomusicology's research methods and findings within the study of ecologies, may be useful in expanding students' comprehension of some ideas taught within the subject of biology. The "wild pedagogies" approach has also been proposed as an innovative way of integrating music studies into environmental concerns within both schools and university education.

== See also ==
- Anthropology
- Ecology
- Acoustic ecology
- Environmental activism
- Environmental studies
- Ethnomusicology
- Musicology
- Sociomusicology

== Cited sources ==
- Dawe, Kevin; Allen, Aaron S., eds. (2016). Current Directions in Ecomusicology: Music, Culture, Nature. New York: Routledge. ISBN 9781138062498.
- Feld, Steven (1990). Sound and Sentiment: Birds, Weeping, Poetics, and Song in Kaluli Expression (2nd ed.). Philadelphia: Penn. ISBN 9780812212990.
- Pedelty, Mark (2012). "Pop Goes the Planet". Ecomusicology, Rock, Folk and the Planet. Philadelphia: Temple University Press. ISBN 978-1439907122.
- Schafer, Murray R. (1994). The Soundscape: Our Sonic Environment and the Tuning of the World (PDF). Rochester, Vermont: Destiny Books. ISBN 0-89281-455-1.
- Shevock, Daniel J. (2018). Eco-Literate Music Pedagogy. Routledge New Directions in Music Education Series. New York: Routledge. ISBN 9780415792578.
