= Floro =

Floro may refer to:

== People ==
- Florentino Floro (born 1953), Filipino judge disbarred for mental illness
- Benito Floro (born 1952), Spanish football manager
- Dylan Floro (born 1990), American baseball player
- Gilles Floro (1964–1999), French Antillean zouk-love singer
- Floro Dery, Filipino illustrator
- Floro Díaz (1906–?), Argentine fencer in the 1948 Olympics
- Floro Bogado (1939–2017), Argentine politician

== Places ==
- Florø, a town in Norway
- San Floro, a town in Italy

== Other uses ==
- Floronic Man, a plant/human hybrid character in DC Comics
