= Green (Hiroshi Yoshimura album) =

Studio album by Hiroshi Yoshimura
- Released: 1986
- Recorded: 1985–1986
- Genres: Ambient; minimalist; new-age
- Length: 43:44
- Labels: Sona Gaia; Light in the Attic
- Producer: Hiroshi Yoshimura

Hiroshi Yoshimura chronology
| Soundscape 1: Surround (1986) | Green (1986) | Flora (1987) |

Professional ratings
Review scores
| Source | Rating |
|---|---|
| AllMusic | 4.5/5 stars |
| Pitchfork | 8.8/10 |

Green is the fifth studio album by Japanese musician and comoposer Hiroshi Yoshimura, released in 1986 by Sona Gaia and re-issued in 2020 on Light in the Attic Records.

== Background ==
After being released on vinyl in Japan, the album was released on CD in the United States with a different mix, adding additional ambient environmental noises such as rain and birds to market to the new age audience.

== Track listing ==
All tracks written and produced by Hiroshi Yoshimura

| No. | Title | Length |
|---|---|---|
| 1. | "Creek" | 6:02 |
| 2. | "Feel" | 4:33 |
| 3. | "Sheep" | 5:32 |
| 4. | "Sleep" | 6:50 |
| 5. | "Green" | 5:21 |
| 6. | "Feet" | 6:19 |
| 7. | "Street" | 7:29 |
| 8. | "Teevee" | 3:49 |
