= Flora station (Illinois) =

- Baltimore and Ohio Railroad Depot
- U.S. National Register of Historic Places
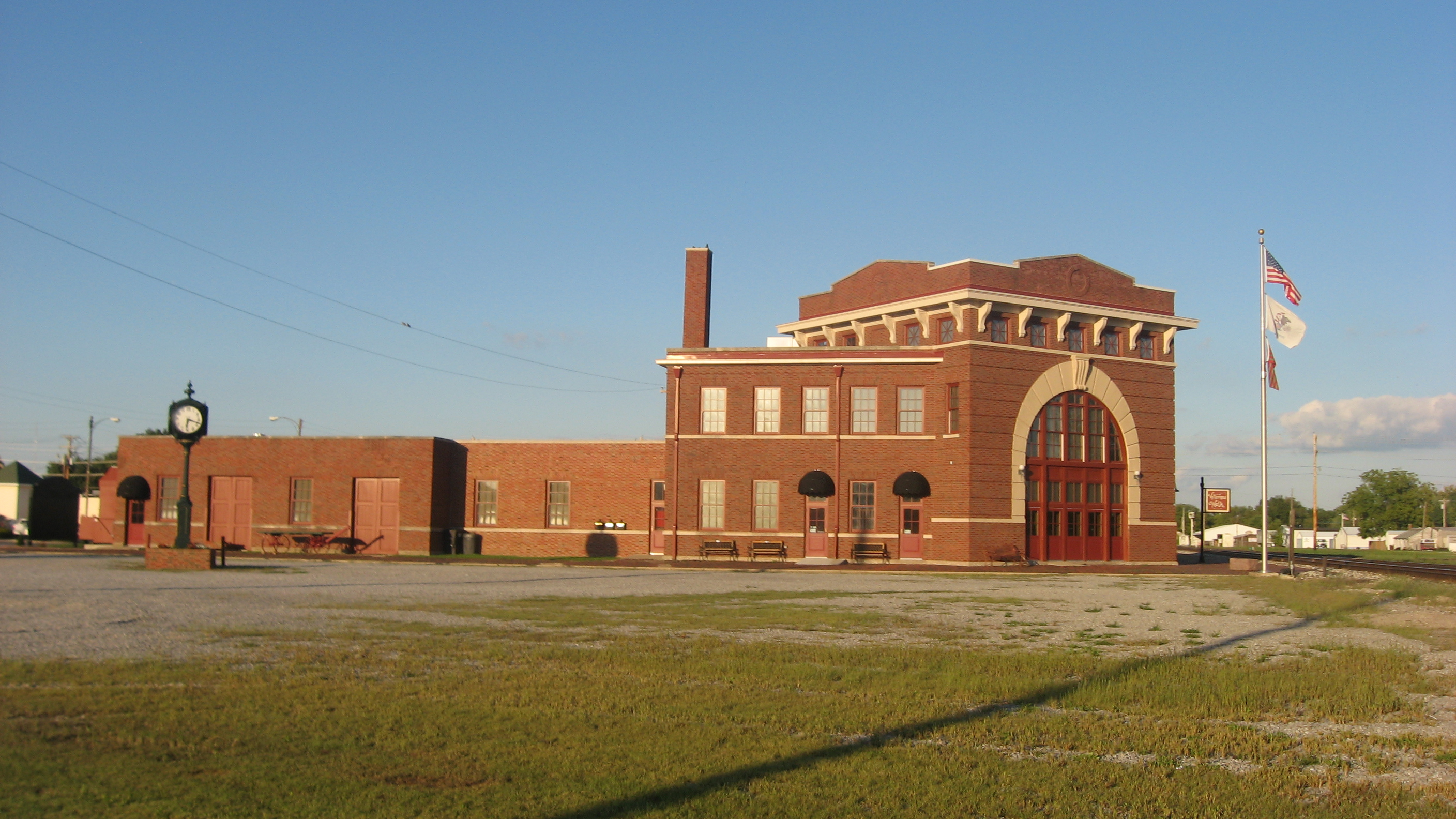

- Location within Illinois Location within the United States
- Location: 225 W. Railroad St., Flora, Illinois
- Coordinates: 38°40′4″N 88°29′18″W
- Area: 1.4 acres (0.57 ha)
- Built: 1917
- Architect: Frank Nichols
- Architectural style: Italian Renaissance, Romanesque Revival, Classical Revival
- NRHP reference No.: 98000112
- Added to NRHP: February 20, 1998

Flora station is a historic Baltimore & Ohio Railroad depot which served Flora, Illinois. The depot was built from 1916 to 1917 by Frank Nichols; its design features several architectural styles, including Italian Renaissance Revival, Romanesque Revival, and Classical Revival. After the depot opened, the B&O Railroad became the largest employer in Flora, employing approximately half of the town's population through the mid-1920s, and was credited with the town's growth and economic success. The B&O also sponsored community groups such as a band and baseball teams. Passenger service to the station ended in 1973, and the empty station is now surrounded by vacant lots. The depot was added to the National Register of Historic Places on February 20, 1998, as the Baltimore and Ohio Railroad Depot.

| Preceding station | Baltimore and Ohio Railroad | Following station |
|---|---|---|
| Kenner's toward St. Louis | St. Louis Line | Clay City toward Cumberland |
| Louis toward Beardstown | Beardstown – Shawneetown | Rinard toward Shawneetown |
