= Netherfield =

Netherfield may refer to:

- Netherfield, Milton Keynes, a housing estate in Woughton, Buckinghamshire, England
- Netherfield, East Sussex, a village in East Sussex, England
- Netherfield, Nottinghamshire, a town in Nottinghamshire, England
  - Netherfield railway station
- Kendal Town F.C., an English football club which was originally called Netherfield AFC
- Netherfield, a fictional estate in Jane Austen's novel Pride and Prejudice
- Netherfields, an area of Middlesbrough North Yorkshire, England
- Netherfield (Liverpool ward), defunct ward in Merseyside, Liverpool
