= Bingham railway station =

Railway station in Nottinghamshire, England

Coordinates: 52°57′15″N 0°57′05″W

Bingham
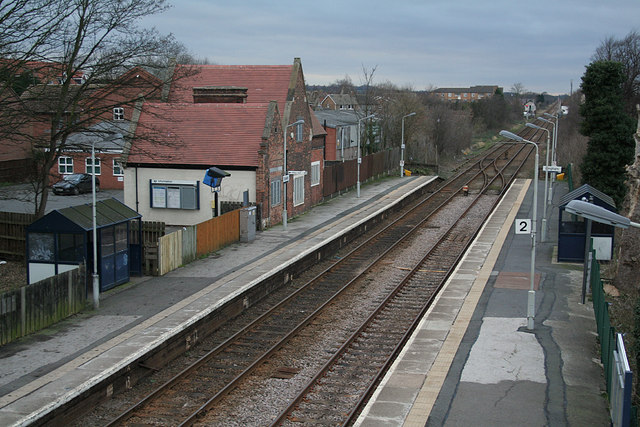

General information
- Location: Bingham, Rushcliffe; England
- Grid reference: SK705401
- Managed by: East Midlands Railway
- Platforms: 2

Other information
- Station code: BIN
- Classification: DfT category F1

History
- Opened: 1850

Passengers
- 2020/21: ▼14,442
- 2021/22: ▲55,774
- 2022/23: ▲63,540
- 2023/24: ▼61,816
- 2024/25: ▲72,680
Location
Notes
- Passenger statistics from the Office of Rail and Road

Bingham railway station serves the market town of Bingham, Nottinghamshire, England. The station is 8½ miles (14 km) east of Nottingham on the Nottingham-Skegness Line. The station is operated and served by East Midlands Railway.

== History ==
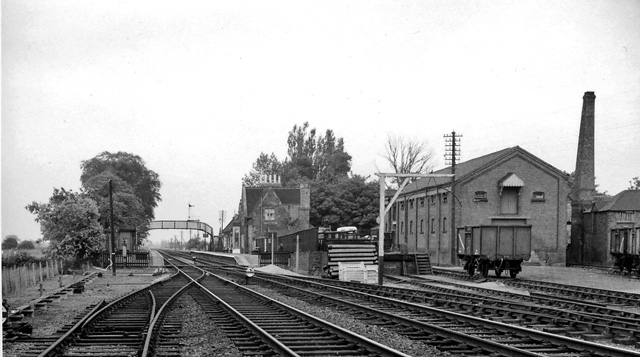
Bingham station on 13 July 1963

Passenger services started on 15 July 1850. It is located on the line first opened by the Ambergate, Nottingham, Boston and Eastern Junction Railway and taken over by the Great Northern Railway. The buildings were designed by Thomas Chambers Hine.

In 1851 the first station master, Thomas Hand, absconded with five days' takings from passengers travelling to the Nottingham Fair.

Between 1879 and 1953, Bingham was also served by Bingham Road station on the Great Northern and London and North Western Joint Railway. It was used for London and North Western Railway services between Nottingham London Road and stations to Northampton.

From 7 January 1963 passenger steam trains between Grantham, Bottesford, Elton and Orston, Aslockton, Bingham, Radcliffe-on-Trent, Netherfield and Colwick, Nottingham London-road (High Level) and Nottingham (Victoria) were replaced by diesel multiple-unit trains.

=== Station masters ===
- Thomas Hand, 1850–1851
- Robert John Nicholson, c. 1865
- J. W. Page (afterwards station master at Harby and Stathern)
- Charles Richardson, 1877–1898
- George Tagg 1898
- Mr Chandler, up to 1902 (afterwards station master at Little Bytham)
- John Thomas James, c. 1913
- A. Smith, up to 1937 (afterwards station master at Loughborough Central)
- Albert S. Langford, c. 1940 – 1949
- F. L. Cantwell, c. 1959–1961
- J. H. Fisher, from 1961

== Services ==
There is generally an hourly service daily westbound to Nottingham and eastbound towards Grantham and Skegness. One early morning weekday service to Peterborough and Norwich also calls here.

| Preceding station | National Rail | Following station |
|---|---|---|
| Radcliffe | East Midlands Railway Nottingham–Grantham line | Aslockton |
| | Disused railways | |
| Radcliffe-on-Trent | Great Northern Railway; Nottingham to Grantham; Nottingham to Newark | Aslockton |
