= Rectory Junction Viaduct =

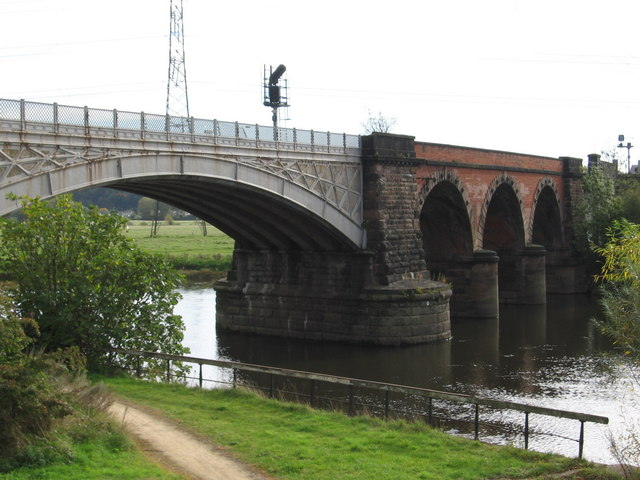
- Coordinates: 52.9511°N 1.0541°W
- Carries: Nottingham-Grantham Line
- Crosses: River Trent
- Other name: Radcliffe Viaduct
- Heritage status: Grade II listed

Characteristics
- Material: Cast iron
- Longest span: 110 feet (34 m)
- Clearance below: 24 feet (7.3 m)

History
- Opened: 1850

Location
- Interactive map of Rectory Junction Viaduct

Rectory Junction Viaduct, also known as the Radcliffe Viaduct, crosses the River Trent between Netherfield and Radcliffe on Trent near Nottingham. It is a Grade II listed building.

== History ==
The bridge was built in 1850 by Clayton & Shuttleworth of Lincoln on the Nottingham-Grantham Line for the Ambergate, Nottingham, Boston and Eastern Junction Railway.

The Trent Navigation Company demanded a minimum clear span of 100 feet (30 m), so the railway company built a 110 feet (34 m) cast iron arch. The clearance above the water is 24 feet (7.3 m). The iron arch was formed of six ribs, constructed in eight segments.

The approach viaduct, originally constructed in timber and comprising 32 spans, was rebuilt in brick in 1909-1910 by Alexander Ross. The brick viaduct comprises 28 spans, eighteen are 24 ft 11 ins, and ten are 25 ft 7 ins.

The internal cast iron ribs were encased in concrete by British Rail in 1981 to increase the strength of the bridge, but the original cast iron ribs on the exterior were left exposed, leaving the bridge appearance little changed.

Next crossing upstream	River Trent	Next crossing downstream
Waterside Bridge; Pedestrian and cycle bridge	Rectory Junction Railway Bridge; Grid reference SK636397	Gunthorpe Bridge; A6097

== See also ==
- List of crossings of the River Trent
- Listed buildings in Radcliffe-on-Trent
- Listed buildings in Stoke Bardolph
