= Gedling and Carlton railway station =

Former railway station in Nottinghamshire, England

Coordinates: 52.9747°N 1.0742°W

Gedling & Carlton

General information
- Location: Carlton, Gedling; England
- Platforms: 2

Other information
- Status: Disused

History
- Original company: Great Northern Railway
- Pre-grouping: Great Northern Railway
- Post-grouping: London and North Eastern Railway; London Midland Region of British Railways

Key dates
- 1 February 1876: Opened
- 4 April 1960: Closed
Location

Gedling and Carlton railway station was a former railway station built to serve the villages of Gedling and Carlton in Nottinghamshire.

== History ==
It was opened by the Great Northern Railway (Great Britain) on its Derbyshire Extension in 1875–6. It was on the climb from the junction at Colwick with the Ambergate, Nottingham, Boston and Eastern Junction Railway into Nottingham London Road.

From Gedling and Carlton, the line climbed through Mapperley Tunnel between the Trent and Leen valleys, reaching the first summit of the line at Arno Vale.

Mapperley Tunnel was extremely unstable due to mining subsidence and the heavy traffic through it. In 1925 part of the roof collapsed, blocking the line, and this was part of the reason that this section of line closed prematurely.

In December 1956 in thick fog, a goods train struck Paul Potter, aged 10, who was crossing the track. The train passed over him and he survived with only minor injuries

Gedling station closed in 1960.

=== Stationmasters ===
- Joseph Gibson ca. 1876
- John Bott ca. 1877
- George Wilson ca. 1880 ca. 1881
- John Brook ca. 1883 ca. 1885
- George Baker ca. 1888
- Richard Maddison 1889 - 1901
- John Smedley ca. 1902
- Benjamin William Stocks 1903 - 1920
- Frederick Joseph Wilson ca. 1922 ca. 1925
- C.S. Barnard ca. 1950
- Sam S. Scott (formerly station master at Pye Hall, afterwards station master at Swinton)

Preceding station	Disused railways	Following station
Nottingham London; Road Low Level	London Midland Region of British Railways; GNR Derbyshire and Staffordshire Extension	Daybrook

== Present day ==
The original station building is currently owned by a youth group
