= Nottingham Racecourse railway station =

Former railway station in Nottingham, England

Coordinates: 52.94970°N 1.11442°W

Nottingham Racecourse

General information
- Location: Colwick, Nottingham; England
- Platforms: 2

Other information
- Status: Disused

History
- Original company: Great Northern Railway
- Pre-grouping: Great Northern Railway
- Post-grouping: London and North Eastern Railway; London Midland Region of British Railways

Key dates
- 19 August 1892: Opened
- 8 December 1959: Closed
Location

Nottingham Racecourse railway station was a station opened by the Great Northern Railway to serve Nottingham Racecourse in Nottingham, England. The station was normally only open on race days.

== History ==
The Racecourse station was built in 1892 in conjunction with construction of the racecourse. Both the station and racecourse opened on 19 August 1892, where 26 trains stopped at the new station throughout the day, including a special train from London King's Cross.

The station was closed on 8 December 1959.

The loading dock which was used for transferring horses to and from trains is still visible on the south side of Daleside Road East. Today the racecourse is served by Nottingham Station located two miles from the course.

Preceding station	Disused railways	Following station
Nottingham London; Road Low Level	London Midland Region of British Railways; Nottingham to Grantham Line	Netherfield
