= Radcliffe railway station =

Railway station in Radcliffe-on-Trent, Nottinghamshire

Radcliffe
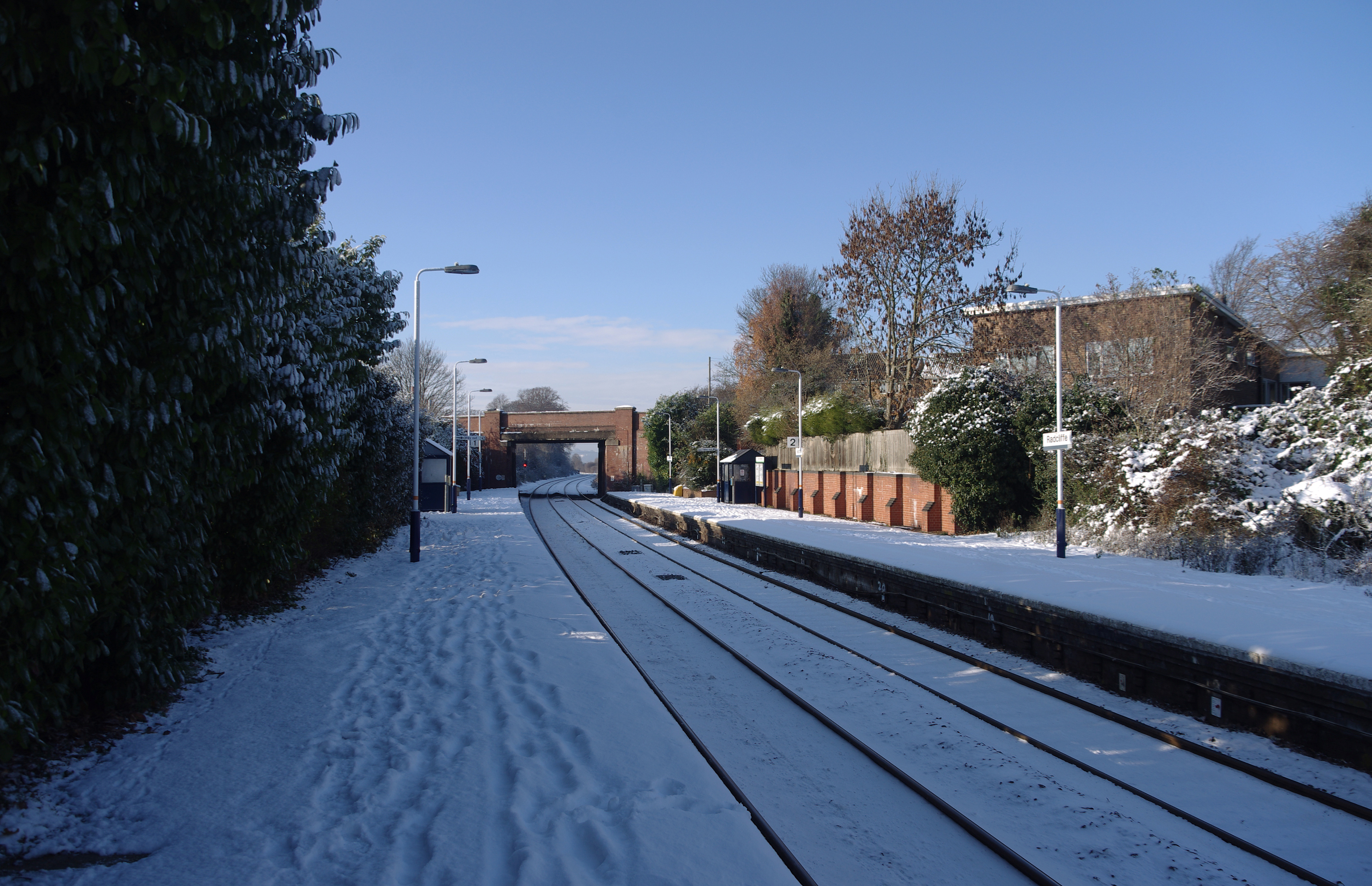

General information
- Location: Radcliffe-on-Trent, Rushcliffe; England
- Coordinates: 52.9488°N 1.0370°W
- Grid reference: SK648394
- Manager: East Midlands Railway
- Platforms: 2

Other information
- Station code: RDF
- Classification: DfT category F1

History
- Opened: 15 July 1850

Passengers
- 2021/22: ▲9,838
- 2022/23: ▲11,882
- 2023/24: ▲12,980
- 2024/25: ▲13,844
- 2025/26: ▲22,528
Location
Notes
- Passenger statistics from the Office of Rail and Road

Radcliffe railway station (also known as Radcliffe-on-Trent and Radcliffe (Notts)) serves the town of Radcliffe-on-Trent in Nottinghamshire, England. It lies on the Nottingham to Grantham Line, 5 miles (8 km) east of Nottingham. Services run to Nottingham, Grantham, Boston and Skegness.

== History ==
It is located on the line first opened by the Ambergate, Nottingham, Boston and Eastern Junction Railway on 15 July 1850 and taken over by the Great Northern Railway.

The station itself was opened by the Great Northern Railway. The station buildings were designed by Thomas Chambers Hine.

The Great Northern and London and North Western Joint Railway opened in 1879 from Saxondale Junction, a few miles east of the station. The London and North Western Railway then provided a Nottingham to Northampton service which ceased in 1953.

From 7 January 1963 passenger steam trains between Grantham, Bottesford, Elton and Orston, Aslockton, Bingham, Radcliffe-on-Trent, Netherfield and Colwick, Nottingham London-road (High Level) and Nottingham (Victoria) were replaced with diesel-multiple unit trains.

The station was renamed from Radcliffe on Trent to Radcliffe on 6 May 1974.

== Services ==
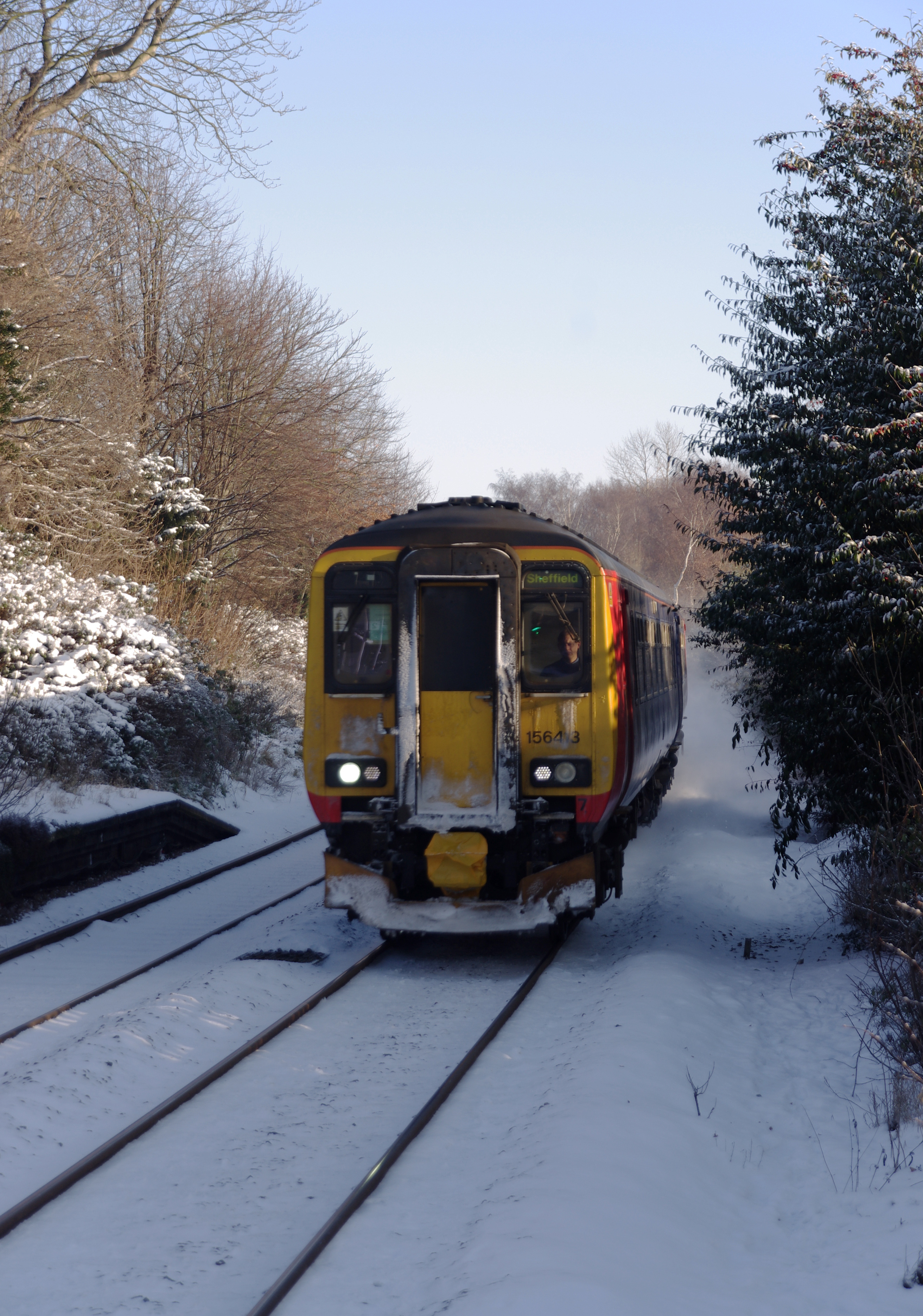
Services at Radcliffe are provided by East Midlands Railway, mostly using Class 158 or Class 170 units. In the late 2010 snow, 156413 speeds through the station with a non-stop service.

As of the December 2025 timetable, there is an hourly service to Nottingham and Skegness, with late evening eastbound services terminating at Boston. All services are provided by East Midlands Railway, usually using Class 158 or Class 170 units. Express services between Norwich and Liverpool Lime Street call at the station once a day towards Liverpool, and also call here on one Sunday train to Norwich. A reduced service operates on Sundays, with six calls in each direction.

Preceding station	National Rail	Following station
Netherfield	East Midlands Railway Nottingham–Grantham line	Bingham
	Disused railways	
Netherfield	Great Northern Railway; Nottingham to Grantham / Newark	Bingham
Netherfield	London and North Western Railway; Nottingham to Northampton	Bingham Road
