= Nottingham London Road railway station =

Disused railway station in Nottinghamshire, England

Coordinates: 52°56′53″N 1°08′21″W

Nottingham London Road Low Level
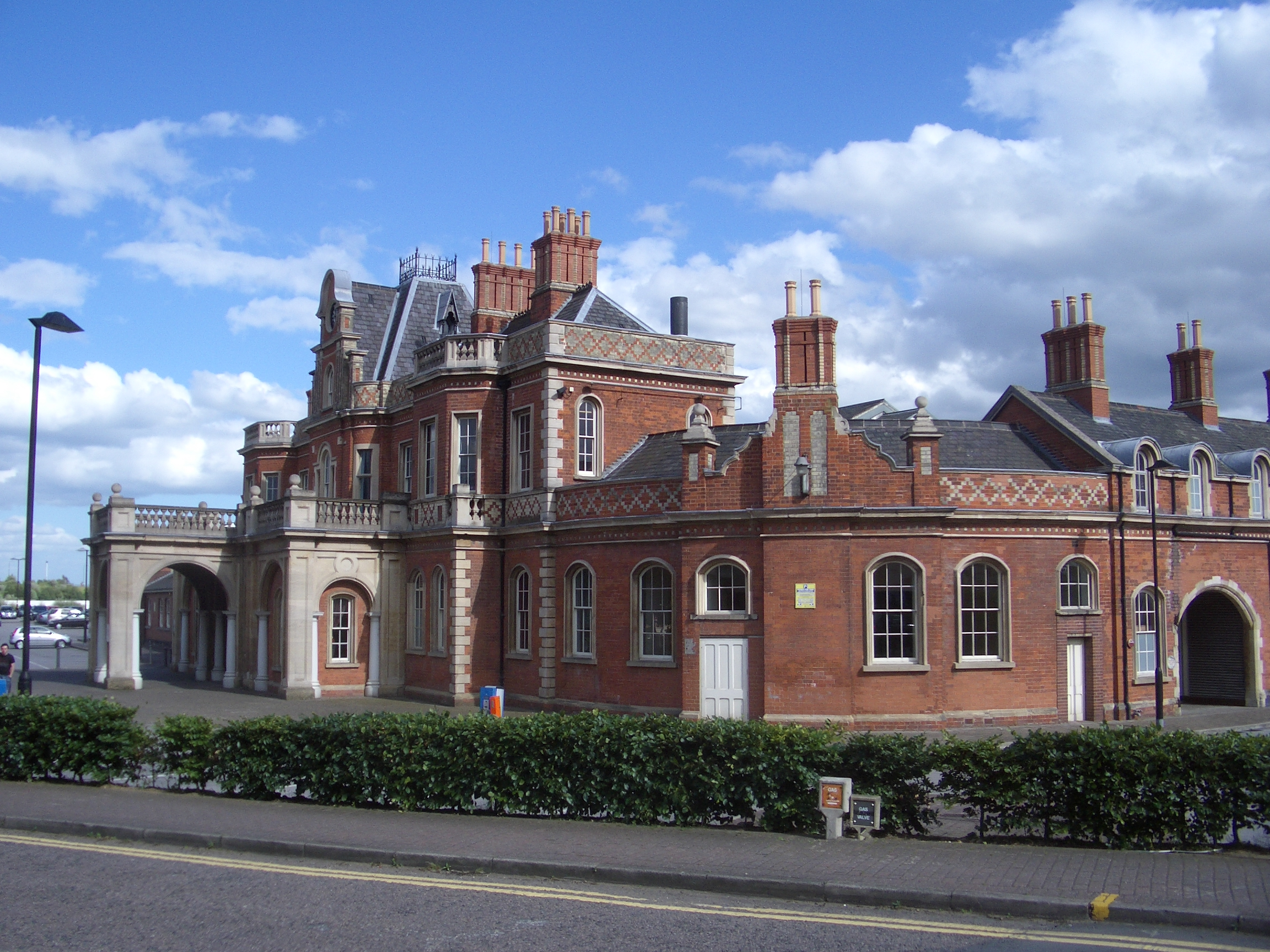
- The station in 2008

General information
- Location: Nottingham; England
- Grid reference: SK580394
- Platforms: 5

Other information
- Status: Disused

History
- Original company: Ambergate, Nottingham, Boston and Eastern Junction Railway
- Pre-grouping: Great Northern Railway
- Post-grouping: London and North Eastern Railway, London Midland Region of British Railways

Key dates
- 3 October 1857: Opened as Nottingham London Road
- 15 March 1899: Renamed Nottingham London Road Low Level
- 22 May 1944: Closed to passengers
- January 1966: Station began use as a parcels concentration depot
- 11 July 1988: Closure to rail traffic
Location

Nottingham London Road railway station was a complex of two railway stations which served the city of Nottingham in England. The low level station was opened by the Great Northern Railway on London Road in 1857, and closed to passengers on 22 May 1944. The site continued to be used for goods, and later parcels, until its complete closure to rail traffic in 1988. The high level station was opened in 1900 in order to serve trains coming to and from the then-new Nottingham Victoria railway station. It was closed in 1967 and subsequently demolished in 2006.

== London Road Low Level ==
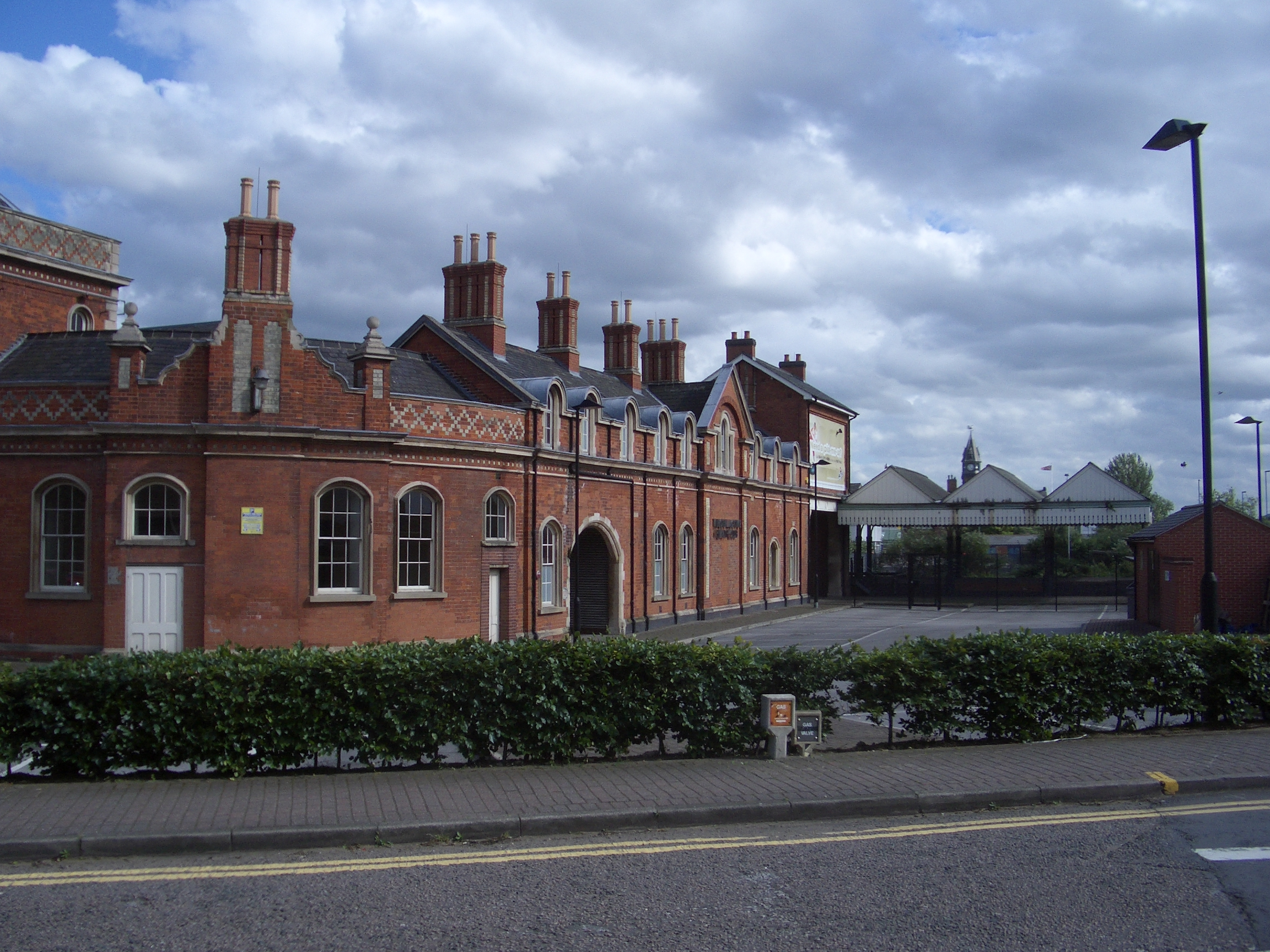

The Great Northern Railway (GNR) opened the station at the terminus of its line from Grantham, originally built by the Ambergate, Nottingham, Boston and Eastern Junction Railway. The station was designed by the local architect Thomas Chambers Hine. GNR trains originally used Nottingham Midland station, but there were frequent disputes; this included when the GNR began running through trains from London King's Cross via Grantham in a shorter time than the Midland Railway could manage. To solve the problem, the GNR opened its own station served by a new line from near Netherfield, adjacent to the Midland line whose tracks it had previously used.

The station cost £20,000 (equivalent to £2,409,970 in 2026) to build and originally featured two platforms, one for arrivals and one for departures. In 1880 the number of platforms was increased to five.

On 19 November 1889, Judge Bristowe of the Nottingham County Court was getting onto a train at the station when he was shot with a revolver by Wilhelm Edward Arnemann. Arnemann was convicted of attempted murder and sentenced to 20 years penal servitude.

To avoid confusion once the high level station was opened in 1900, the existing station was renamed Nottingham London Road Low Level. With through services established to Nottingham Victoria, passenger services at the low level station were substantially reduced. The average number of weekday passenger train departures went from 65 per day in July 1898 to just six per day in 1910. By 1938 only five departures per day and the station was closed to passengers completely on 22 May 1944. The station, however, remained open as a goods depot and from January 1966 as a parcels concentration depot. In 1972 the station became a grade II listed building. The station was closed completely to rail traffic on 11 July 1988.

In 1998, Nottingham City Council approved a planning application to restore the building and convert it into a Holmes Place health and fitness club, which opened in May 1999. Since 2006 the building has been operated by Virgin Active.

== London Road High Level ==
Nottingham London Road High Level
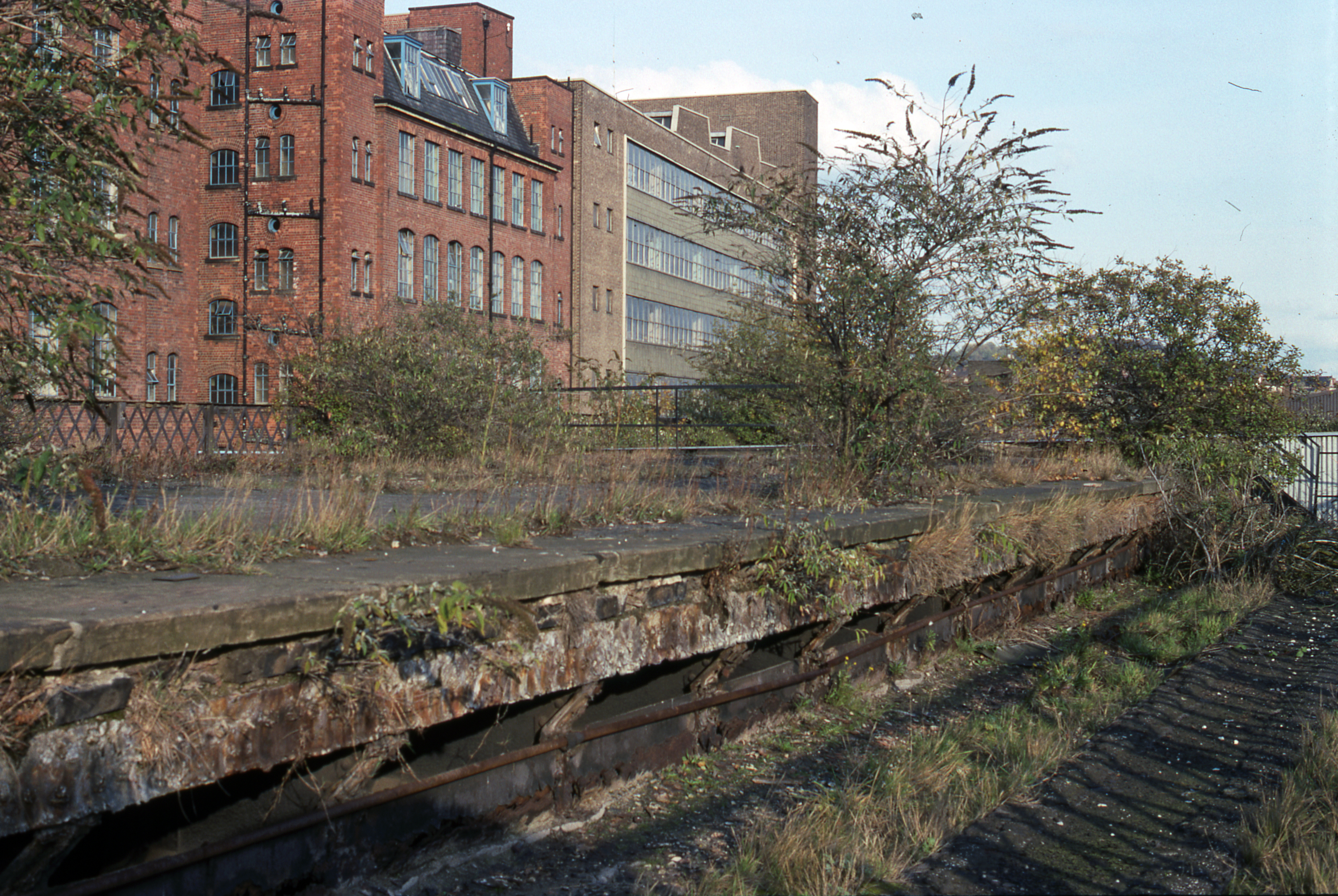
- The abandoned platforms of the high level station in 1992

General information
- Location: Nottingham; England
- Grid reference: SK579393
- Platforms: 2

Other information
- Status: Demolished

History
- Original company: Great Northern Railway
- Post-grouping: London and North Eastern Railway, London Midland Region of British Railways

Key dates
- 24 May 1900: Station opened
- 3 July 1967: Closed to passengers
- 2006: Station demolished
Location

When Nottingham Victoria was opened in 1900, the Great Northern had to construct a new chord line. It was carried mainly on brick arches and steel girders, from a junction at Trent Lane, east of London Road, to Weekday Cross Junction where it joined the Great Central Main Line. The new chord line included a station on an island platform, reached by means of a staircase from a booking office on the same approach road to the earlier London Road terminus. The transfer to Victoria station gave the Great Northern a prestigious location and avoided their need to reverse trains to and from Grantham, Derbyshire and north of Nottingham.

From 7 January 1963, passenger steam trains between Grantham, London Road (High Level) and Victoria were replaced with diesel multiple units.

Passengers services to the High Level station were withdrawn on 3 July 1967, when the service to Grantham was diverted to Nottingham Midland. By 1975 the platform buildings had been demolished and the track lifted. The rest of the station was demolished in 2006.

Preceding station	Disused railways	Following station
Terminus	London Midland Region of British Railways (Derby) Friargate Line	Gedling & Carlton
Terminus	London Midland Region of British Railways; Nottingham to Grantham Line	Nottingham Racecourse
Nottingham Victoria	Great Northern Railway; Nottingham to Grantham; Nottingham to Newark; Nottingham to Shirebrook; Nottingham to Basford & Bulwell	Netherfield
Nottingham Victoria	Great Northern Railway; Nottingham Suburban	Thorneywood

== See also ==
- Listed buildings in Nottingham (Bridge ward)
