= Bingham Road railway station (Nottinghamshire) =

Former railway station in Nottinghamshire, England

Coordinates: 52.94963°N 0.96462°W

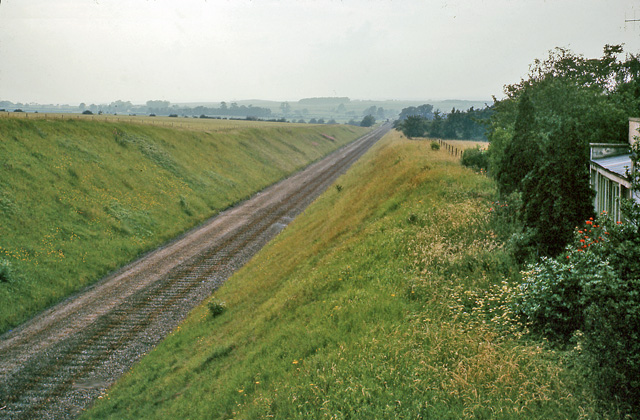
Site of Bingham Road Station in 1963

Bingham Road railway station, on the Great Northern and London and North Western Joint Railway, was one of two stations serving the town of Bingham, Nottinghamshire.

== History ==
It opened in 1879 and closed to regular traffic in 1951. The other station, Bingham on the Great Northern Railway Grantham to Nottingham line, is still open.

=== Station masters ===
- J. Price
- F.C.B. Baxter 1921 - 1934 (afterwards station master at Caythorpe)
- A. Smith 1934 - 1937 (also station master at Bingham, afterwards station master at Loughborough Central)
Former Services

Preceding station	Disused railways	Following station
Barnstone	London and North Western Railway; Northampton to Nottingham	Radcliffe-on-Trent
