= Netherfield railway station =

Railway station in Nottinghamshire, England

Coordinates: 52°57′41″N 1°04′45″W

Netherfield
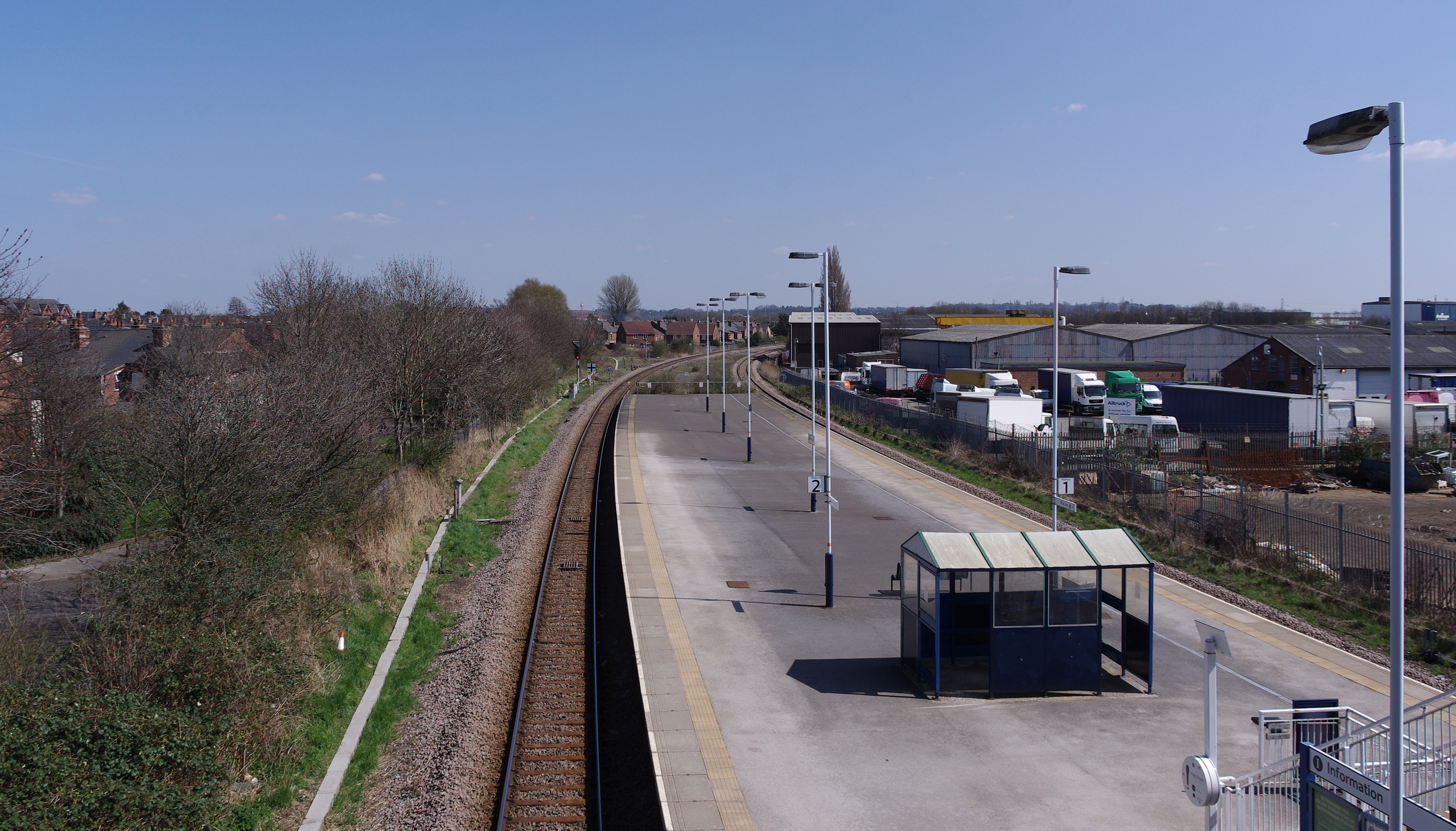

General information
- Location: Netherfield, Gedling; England
- Grid reference: SK619408
- Manager: East Midlands Railway
- Platforms: 2

Other information
- Station code: NET
- Classification: DfT category F2

Key dates
- May 1878: Opened as Colwick
- 1 May 1883: Renamed Netherfield and Colwick
- August 1901: Renamed Netherfield
- 13 July 1925: Renamed Netherfield and Colwick
- 6 May 1974: Renamed Netherfield

Passengers
- 2021/22: ▲5,556
- 2022/23: ▲6,946
- 2023/24: ▲7,780
- 2024/25: ▲10,000
- 2025/26: ▼9,984
Location
Notes
- Passenger statistics from the Office of Rail and Road

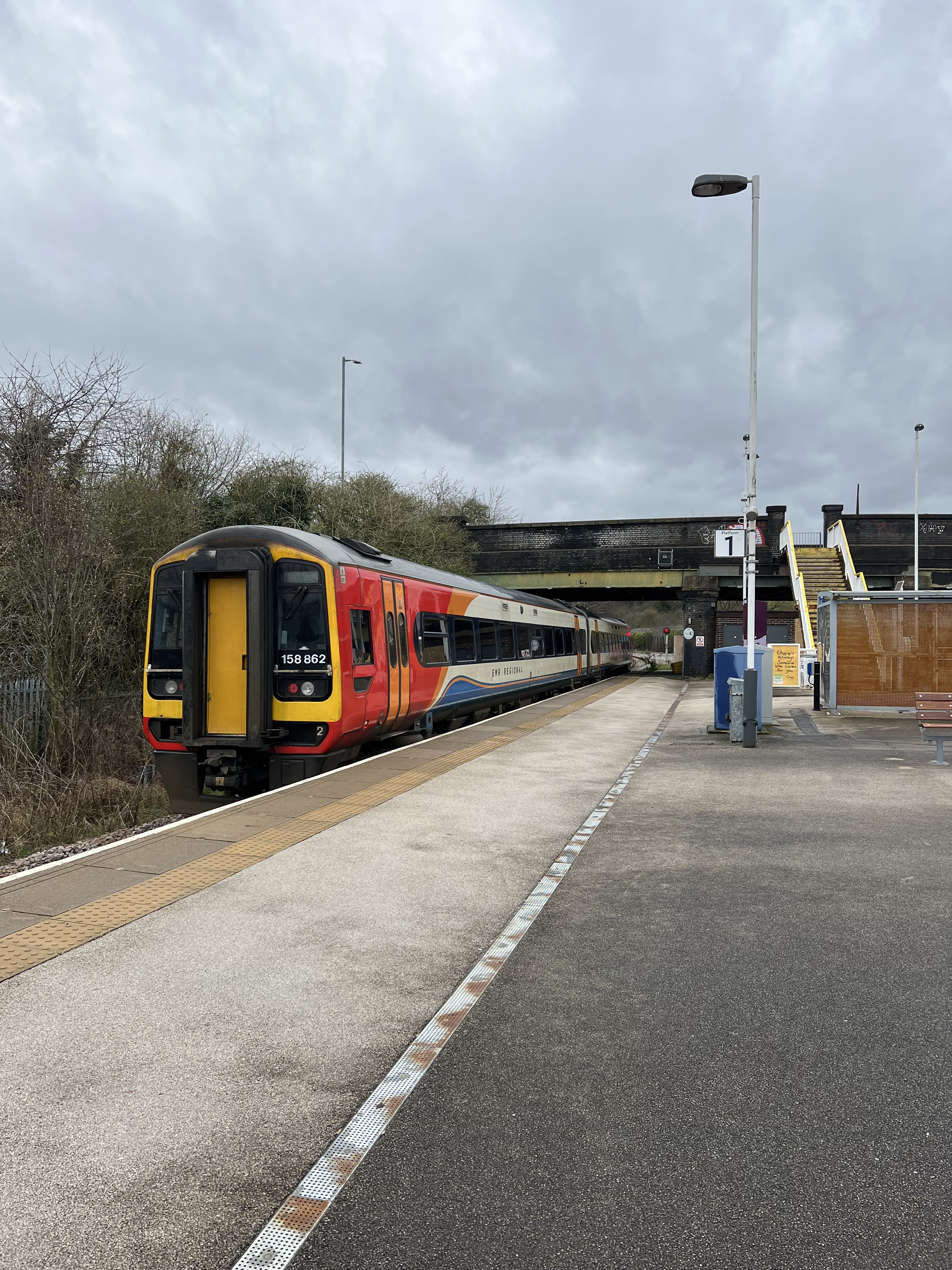
View from platform 1, with East Midlands Railway Class 158 158862 departing

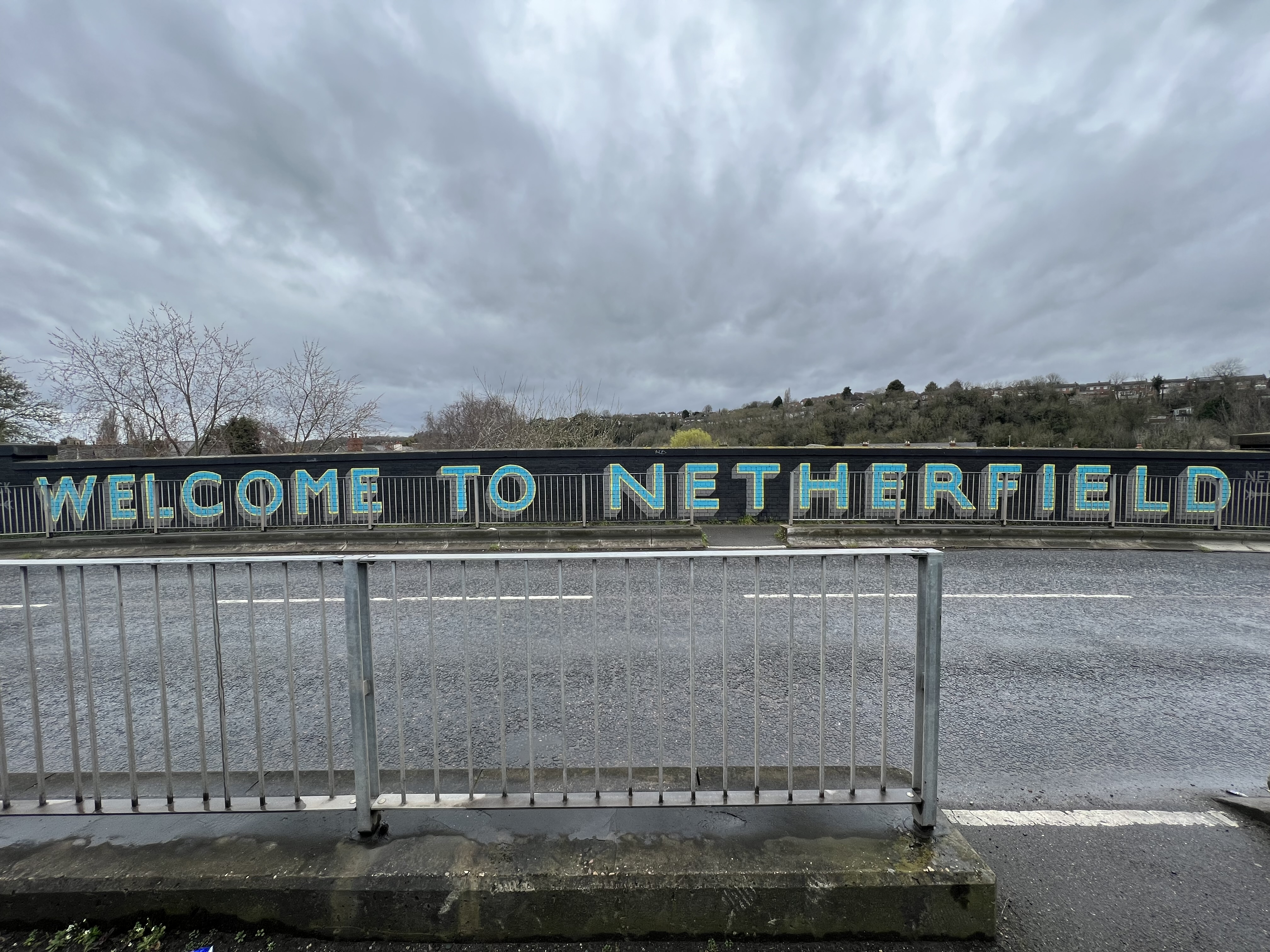
"Welcome to Netherfield" sign painted on the bridge leading to Netherfield railway station

Netherfield railway station (originally opened as Colwick and later known as Netherfield and Colwick) serves the town of Netherfield in the Borough of Gedling in Nottinghamshire, England. It comprises a single island platform with two tracks, with only a single waiting shelter. Access is via a flight of steps down from Chaworth Road, which crosses the line at a bridge at this point.

The station is little-used in comparison with nearby Carlton railway station on the Nottingham to Lincoln Line, which lies barely 460 yards (420 m) away.

== History ==
The station is located on the line first opened by the Ambergate, Nottingham, Boston and Eastern Junction Railway in 1850 and taken over by the Great Northern Railway.

From 7 January 1963 passenger steam trains between Grantham, Bottesford, Elton and Orston, Aslockton, Bingham, Radcliffe-on-Trent, Netherfield and Colwick, Nottingham London Road (High Level) and Nottingham (Victoria) were replaced with diesel-multiple unit trains.

The station was renamed from Netherfield & Colwick to Netherfield on 6 May 1974.

Netherfield station also marks the junction for the disused line to Gedling, which separates to the north 50 yards (46 m) east of Netherfield. The branch then goes under the A612 road, bridges the Nottingham to Lincoln line, crosses over the A612 and terminates at Gedling coal mine.

== Current services ==
Train services are limited here, with just nine "peak time" trains calling at the station on a typical weekday. Four of those trains operate towards Nottingham (three in the morning and one in the evening), and the remaining five (one morning and four afternoon/evening) operate to Skegness. Two trains each way call here on Sundays. All trains are operated by East Midlands Railway.

The station used to have a PlusBus scheme where combined train and bus tickets could be bought at a reduced price, however, it was withdrawn due to low usage owing to the limited rail services. The locality of Netherfield is still part of the Nottingham Plusbus scheme.

Preceding station	National Rail	Following station
Nottingham	East Midlands Railway Nottingham-Grantham Line	Radcliffe

== Former services ==
Preceding station	Disused railways	Following station
Nottingham London Road High Level	London and North Western Railway; Nottingham to Grantham; Nottingham to Newark	Radcliffe
Nottingham London Road High Level	Great Northern Railway; Nottingham to Shirebrook; Nottingham to Basford & Bulwell	Gedling
Nottingham London Road Low Level	London and North Western Railway; Nottingham to Northampton	Radcliffe
