= Grantham Ambergate Yard railway station =

Former railway station in Lincolnshire, England

Coordinates: 52.90881°N 0.65213°W

Grantham Ambergate Yard

General information
- Location: England

Other information
- Status: Disused

History
- Original company: Ambergate, Nottingham, Boston and Eastern Junction Railway

Key dates
- 15 July 1850: Station opened Also known as Grantham Old Wharf
- 2 August 1852: Station closed
Location

Grantham Ambergate Yard railway station was first opened by the Ambergate, Nottingham, Boston and Eastern Junction Railway in 1850 between Grantham and Nottingham as its first terminus.

In some literature it is referred to as "Old Wharf". However, that may have been its location adjacent to the Grantham Canal.

When the Great Northern Railway arrived in 1852, the ANB&EJR acquired running rights into its station.

The station closed on 1 August 1852.

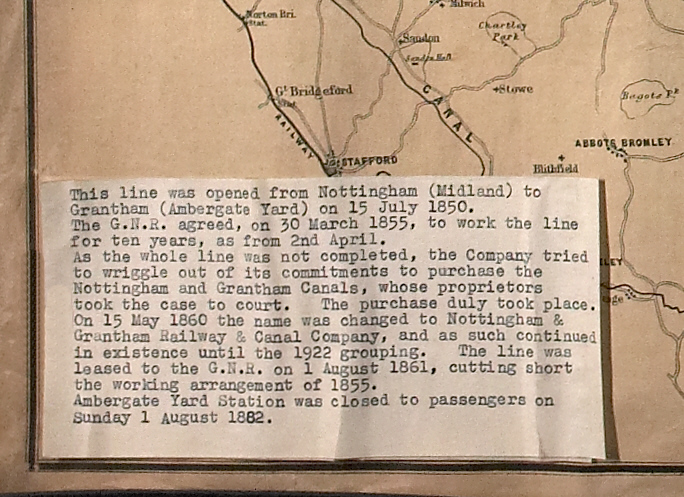
Fragment of the map of the proposed Ambergate, Nottingham & Boston, and Eastern Junction Railway showing the annotation regarding the history of Grantham Ambergate Yard station.
