= Listed buildings in Stoke Bardolph =

Stoke Bardolph is a civil parish in the Gedling district of Nottinghamshire, England. The parish contains two listed buildings that are recorded in the National Heritage List for England. Both the listed buildings are designated at Grade II, the lowest of the three grades, which is applied to "buildings of national importance and special interest". The parish contains the village of Stoke Bardolph and the surrounding area, and the listed buildings consist of a farmhouse and a railway bridge.

== Buildings ==
Name and location	Photograph	Date	Notes
Lowe's Farmhouse and wall 52.97013°N 1.03744°W	—	Early 18th century	The farmhouse, later a private house, is in brick, partly rendered, on a plinth, with dentilled eaves and pantile roofs. There are two storeys and attics, and an L-shaped plan, with a main range of three bays, to the right is a two-storey two-bay recessed extension, and at the rear is a two-storey wing. In the centre of the main range, steps with railings lead up to a doorway with a fanlight, and a hood on curved brackets. The windows on the front are sashes, those in the ground floor with segmental heads, and in the extension are casement windows. The boundary wall is in brick with gabled brick coping, it has a round corner, contains a wooden gate, and extends for about 40 metres (130 ft).
Rectory Junction Viaduct; 52.95112°N 1.05403°W		1851	The bridge was built by the Great Northern Railway to carry its line over the River Trent. The south part is in brick, and consists of three elliptical stone arches with rusticated voussoirs, and stone cutwaters. Above the arches is a stone band, and a brick parapet with stone coping. The north part is crossed by a cast iron span made by Clayton & Shuttleworth. This has lattice girding and iron railings, and is flanked by rusticated stone piers.
