= Colwick Country Park =

Country park in Colwick, Nottingham, England

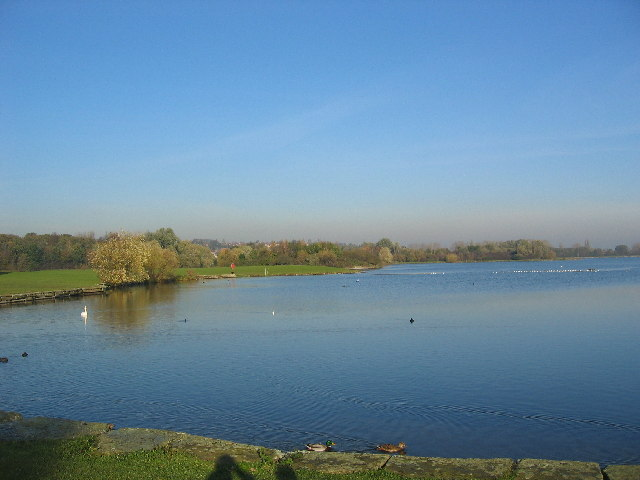
- Interactive map of Colwick Country Park
- Type: Country park
- Location: Colwick, Nottingham, England
- Coordinates: 52.949°N 1.096°W
- Area: 250 acres (100 ha)
- Created: 1978
- Operator: Nottingham City Council
- Open: All year

Colwick Country Park is a country park in Colwick, Nottingham, England.

== History ==
The estate upon which the park resides dates back to 1362. The current house, Colwick Hall, was built in the late 18th century and is now a privately owned hotel. The Country Park opened in 1978, with former gravel workings being landscaped and planted to form a recreational facility for Nottingham. A new visitor centre facility is planned.

== Facilities ==
The park has two lakes, Main Lake covers 65 acres (26 ha) and West Lake covers 24 acres (9.7 ha). West Lake is home to the Nottingham City Open Water Swimming Centre with organised swimming sessions (with swimming not permitted at other times), it is also stocked with carp for fishing and has canoeing and sailing. There are educational facilities, children's play areas, wildlife areas, dog walking, orienteering, geocaching, bird watching and wildlife photography, cycling, horse riding and ranger led activities. There is a centre with activities including power boating, camp crafts and windsurfing. A Parkrun takes place every Saturday morning at 9am, except during pandemics, comprising one lap of Main Lake and two laps of West Lake. There is also a marina for mooring at the River Trent.

== Fauna and flora ==
The Racecourse and Pool is a Site of Special Scientific Interest due to its dragonfly species, this site has recorded 16 species of dragonfly with 14 species breeding. There are around 220 recorded species of birds.

The park is also the site of the largest fish ladder in Britain, giving migratory fish a route to avoid the Colwick Sluices on the River Trent.
