= Daybrook railway station =

Former railway station in Nottinghamshire, England

Coordinates: 52.9949°N 1.1402°W

Daybrook
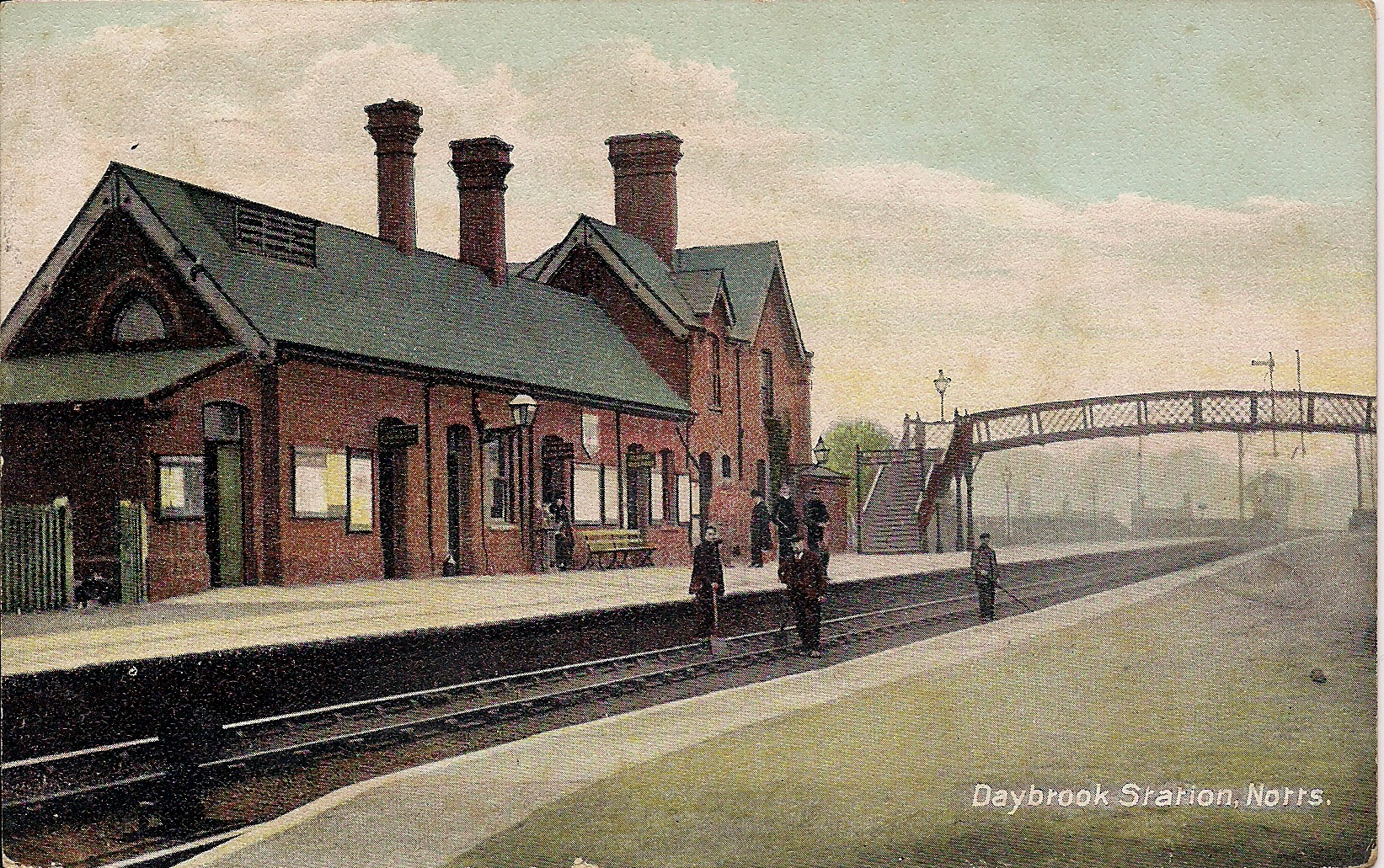

General information
- Location: Daybrook, Gedling; England
- Platforms: 2

Other information
- Status: Disused

History
- Original company: Great Northern Railway
- Pre-grouping: Great Northern Railway
- Post-grouping: London and North Eastern Railway; London Midland Region of British Railways

Key dates
- 1 February 1876: Opened as Bestwood and Arnold
- 1 March 1876: Renamed Daybrook for Arnold and Bestwood
- 1 August 1876: Renamed Daybrook
- 4 April 1960: Closed to passengers
- 1 June 1964: Goods facilities withdrawn
Location

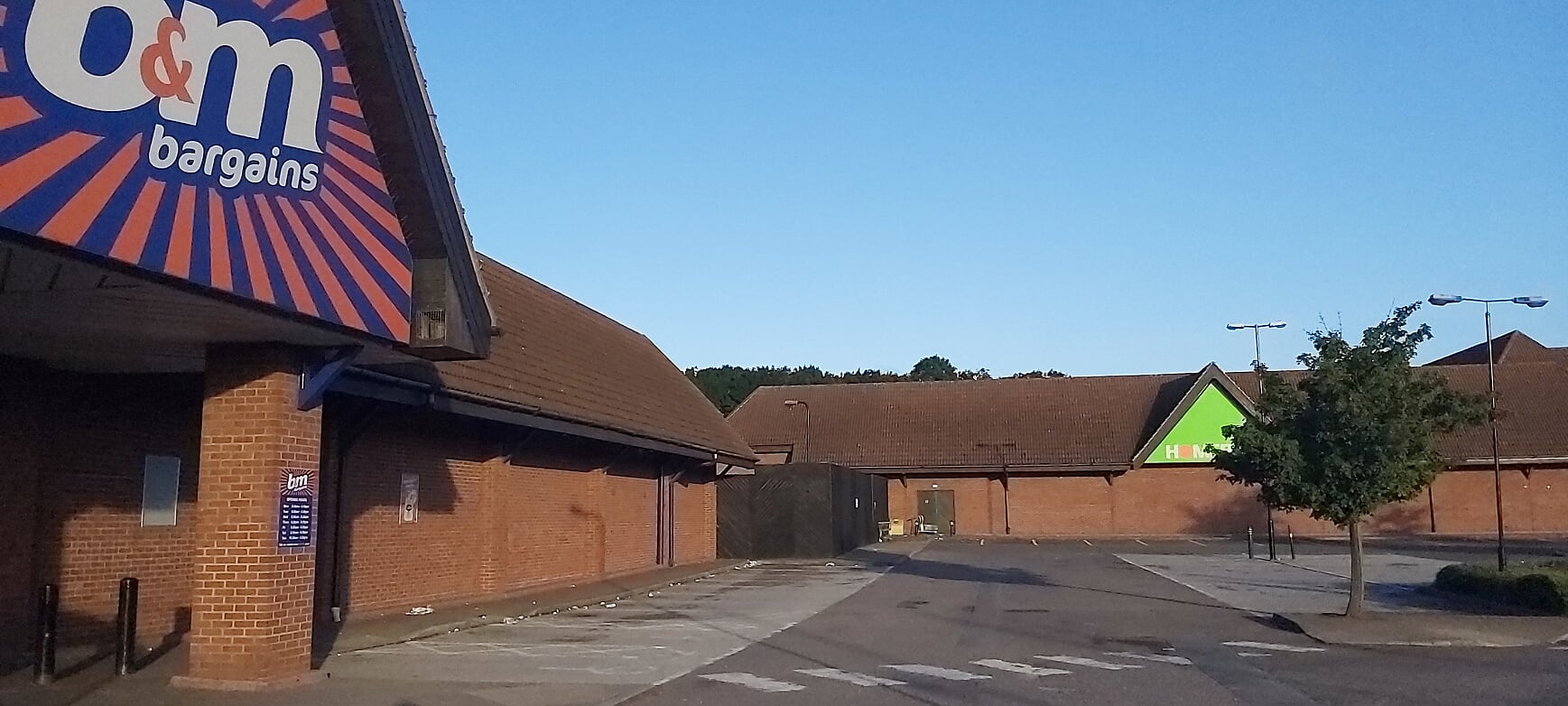
Site of Daybrook station in 2021

Daybrook railway station was a railway station in Daybrook, Nottinghamshire. It was opened by the Great Northern Railway on its Derbyshire and Staffordshire Extension in 1875–6 and closed in 1960. The station also served the nearby town of Arnold.

== History ==
It was on the descent from Arno Vale towards Leen Valley Junction where the line from Annesley joined. The line between Gedling and Carlton and Daybrook closed in 1960 because of mining subsidence in Mapperley Tunnel.

== Stationmasters ==
- Charles Frederick Pulford ca. 1877 - 1907
- Thomas Peacock 1907 - 1928
- J.F. House 1928 - 1929
- F.M. Wright 1930 - 1936 (afterwards stationmaster at Peterborough)
- Joseph George Watts 1936? - 1944 (afterwards acting stationmaster at Kimberley)
- W.H. Arrand 1945 - ca. 1950 - ???? (formerly stationmaster at Arksey, Yorkshire)

Preceding station	Disused railways	Following station
Bulwell Forest	London and North Eastern Railway; Leen Valley Line	Gedling & Carlton
Basford North	London Midland Region of British Railways (Derby) Friargate Line	Gedling & Carlton
Terminus	Great Northern Railway; Nottingham Suburban Railway	Sherwood

== Present day ==
The site is now occupied by retail and a section of trackbed is now a footpath.
