= Saxondale, Nottinghamshire =

Hamlet and civil parish in Nottinghamshire, England

Coordinates: 52.952°N 0.986°W

Saxondale
- Hamlet and civil parish
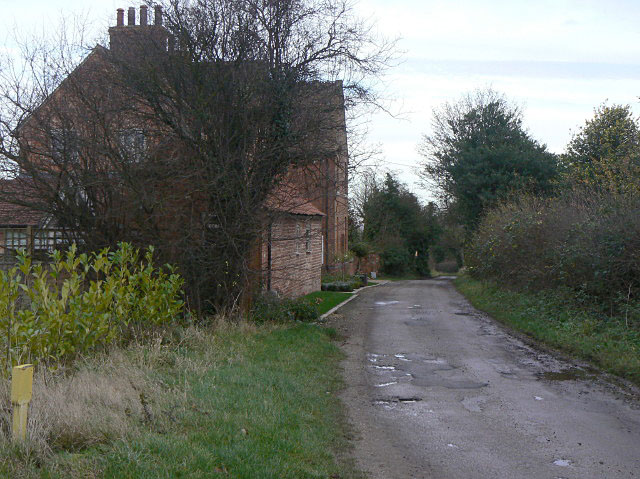
- Main Street, Saxondale

- Location within Nottinghamshire
- Interactive map of Saxondale
- Area: 0.63 sq mi (1.6 km^{2})
- Population: 30 (2021)
  - Density: 48/sq mi (19/km^{2})
- OS grid reference: SK 682398
  - London: 105 mi (169 km) SSE
- District: Rushcliffe
- Shire county: Nottinghamshire
- Region: East Midlands
- Country: England
- Sovereign state: United Kingdom
- Post town: NOTTINGHAM
- Postcode district: NG13
- Dialling code: 01949
- Police: Nottinghamshire
- Fire: Nottinghamshire
- Ambulance: East Midlands
- UK Parliament: Rushcliffe

Saxondale is a small hamlet and civil parish in the Rushcliffe borough of Nottinghamshire, England, situated just off the A52 road near to its junction with the A46 road at the Saxondale roundabout, between the settlements of Bingham and Radcliffe on Trent. There is evidence of an Anglo-Saxon fort with earthworks visible from the main road. 30 residents were recorded at the 2021 census.

The village is just south of the Nottingham to Grantham railway line where there is still evidence of a spur, known as the Barnstone branch, from the former Saxondale Junction through present-day Bingham to Melton Mowbray. The hamlet is close to the residential area of Upper Saxondale, a redevelopment of the former Saxondale Hospital site.
