= A612 road =

Road in England

A612

Major junctions
- Southwest end: A60 near Nottingham; 52.9531°N 1.1386°W
- A6097

- Northeast end: A617 near Newark-on-Trent; 53.0897°N 0.8760°W

Location
- Country: United Kingdom
- Constituent country: England

Road network
- Roads in the United Kingdom; Motorways; A and B road zones

The A612 road is an A-class road in the United Kingdom running between Nottingham and Averham, on the A617 near Newark.

It starts in central Nottingham at a junction with the A60. Initially running east, as Pennyfoot Street, before a right turn sees it head southwards onto Manvers Street, a 4 lane single carriageway which was formerly a B road (B685). The road then crosses the main railway line out of Nottingham to the east over an early 1990s bridge (which again is 4 lane) before meeting Meadow Lane (here unclassified for approximately 100 metres, but further on the A6011) at a triangular roundabout.

After leaving the roundabout the road is two-lane dual carriageway with a 40 mph (64 km/h) speed limit for approximately 1,000 yards (910 m). A further roundabout with Trent Street by a call centre for Virgin Media sees a change to 2 lane single carriageway, as it is for the remainder of its length, retaining the 40 mph (64 km/h) limit. After a further roundabout at Nottingham Racecourse, the limit changes to the national speed limit of 60 mph (97 km/h) until Colwick is reached, when it changes to 30 mph (48 km/h) to pass through a built up stretch.

Leaving Colwick the road becomes the Colwick Loop Road, which bypasses Netherfield, Carlton and Gedling. This section was also built national speed limit, but in May 2007 was reduced to 40 mph (64 km/h) concurrent with the opening of the Gedling bypass, or as it was described in the plans, "Gedling Integrated Transport Scheme". The former section of Colwick Loop Road bypassed by the scheme is now mapped as the A6211, but is unsigned at ground level.

Rejoining the former route at a signalled T-junction, we enter Burton Joyce. Initially a 40 mph (64 km/h) limit, approaching the village centre the limit is reduced to 30 mph (48 km/h). Here, a 1930s bypass would previously have bypassed the bulk of the village but now almost bisects it, as development has spread across the road. Bypassing Bulcote, the road is then 60 mph (97 km/h) again as it opens out towards a roundabout junction with the A6097 at Lowdham.

After leaving Lowdham the road is again open single carriageway with a 60 mph (97 km/h) limit. Gonalston is bypassed, and then we pass through Thurgarton, up a steep hill before the road becomes 60 mph (97 km/h) again. The road between Thurgarton and Southwell is relatively undulating and bendy.

Entering Southwell from the south-west, passing the leisure centre, we then meet the B6386 at a T-junction where you need to turn off the A612 to stay on the numbered route. After passing the West gate to Southwell Minster, the road turns right at a mini roundabout by the Saracen's Head public house and passes the north side of the Minster. A further sharp bend to the left allows us to pass another racecourse, this time Southwell Racecourse, before exiting Southwell past the former workhouse which is now a museum.

Heading east through Upton, past a property owned by the British Horological Society, we meet the A617 near Averham at a signalled T-junction, signalling the end of the route.

Plans have been drawn up by Nottinghamshire County Council to bypass Southwell. The plans have existed since before 1990. The County Council has acquired a number of parcels of land in the line of the plan. However, considerable opposition is building up to the plan. Southwell residents are arguing that the 'line' of the bypass will become a new edge of town, and allow considerable expansion of the urban edge of the town, into the sensitive southern aspect. This is the view which includes the historic town centre and views of the Southwell Minster.

New traffic measures are suggested as an alternative to reduce through traffic, such as an HGV ban except for access, and downgrading this inappropriate route from Lowdham to Newark, to B road status. Through traffic should be directed at Lowdham and Newark to the newly dualled A46.

== Former routes ==
- The 1922 designation of the A612 had the terminus on the A617 in Southwell, not Averham. The latter passed through Farnsfield, Edingley and Halam, before meeting the A612 in Southwell and continuing through Upton to Newark.
- Through Nottingham, the A612 (until the Manvers Street bridge was opened in the early 1990s) passed through Sneinton, Carlton and Gedling, along what is now the B686.
- In 2007, following the opening of the Gedling bypass, the bypassed section became A6211 then unclassified. The former route under the railway bridge, and a length of Stoke Lane, are closed to through traffic by using bus plugs. These are traffic signals permanently on a red light unless a bus is passing through it. The restriction has caused controversy amongst local residents especially in the Nottingham Evening Post.
- In 2011 The 'Bus Plugs' were opened to normal traffic. The traffic signals are still present but change when any vehicle approaches them.

The reopening of the bus plug still causes controversy with many Councillors and locals questioning the validity
