= Netherfield, Nottinghamshire =

Town in Nottinghamshire, England

Coordinates: 52°57′49″N 1°04′41″W

Netherfield
- Town & Suburb
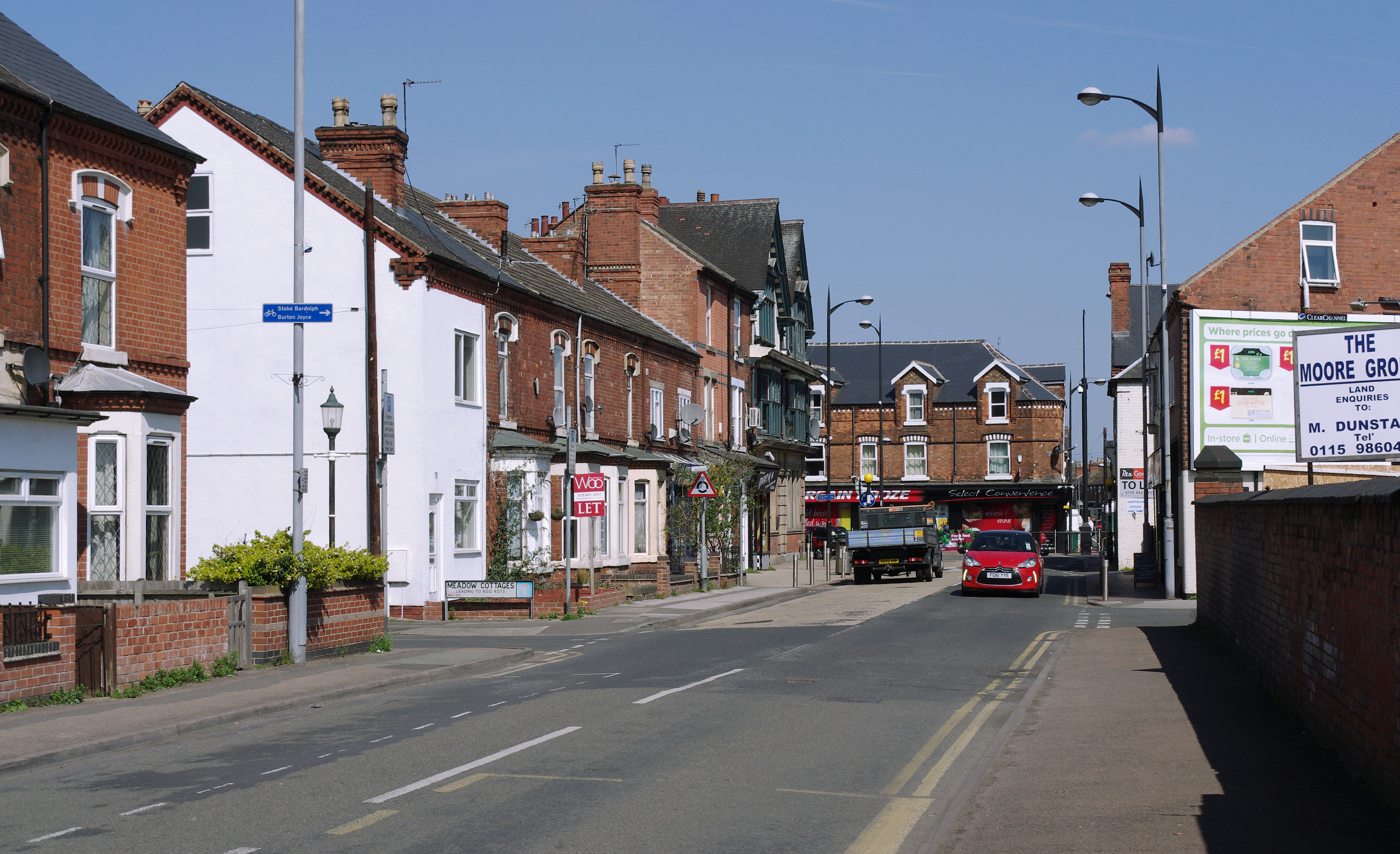
- Meadow Road in April 2013

- Location within Nottinghamshire
- Population: 7,398 (Census 2011)
- OS grid reference: SK 62123 41061
- District: Borough of Gedling
- Shire county: Nottinghamshire
- Region: East Midlands
- Country: England
- Sovereign state: United Kingdom
- Post town: NOTTINGHAM
- Postcode district: NG4
- Dialling code: 0115
- Police: Nottinghamshire
- Fire: Nottinghamshire
- Ambulance: East Midlands
- UK Parliament: Gedling

Netherfield is a small industrial town in the Borough of Gedling in Nottinghamshire, England. It is situated to the east of Nottingham's city boundary and is approximately 3 miles (4.8 km) between Colwick and Carlton in the NG4 postcode area, and near the River Trent. The appropriate Gedling ward was called 'Netherfield and Colwick' until boundary reorganisation in 2015, when it became 'Netherfield', with 'Colwick' becoming a separate ward.. At the time of the 2011 census, the population of this ward was 7,398.

== History ==
Anciently, it was the Nether, or Lower Field of Carlton in the Willows within the Parish of Gedling covering some 168 acres (68 ha), two roods and 19 perches.

The ancient Nether Field was formed by the parochial boundaries and the effects of the eighteenth century enclosure of Gedling.

Nottinghamshire’s Historic Environment Record (HER) entry [M8927] suggests that our Anglo-Saxon forebears established a cremation cemetery in what is now the Netherfield area of Carlton, close to the River Trent and just downstream from Nottingham. There are six known pots which survive and these now reside in the University of Nottingham’s Museum of Archaeology.

The south-western boundary today is the Nottingham–Grantham line, a branch line that follows the ancient course of the River Trent separating the Nether Field from Colwick Parish.

The south eastern boundary is also an old water course of the Trent forming the boundary of the Hesgang pasture which, until recent times belonged to Radcliffe on Trent which is now on the other side of the present course of the River Trent.

The north-eastern boundary is formed by the Ouse Dyke, separating Netherfield from the parish of Stoke Bardolph and lastly the northwestern boundary is now the Nottingham to Lincoln railway line.

When in 1846 the Midland Railway Company opened their Nottingham to Lincoln line it formed the northwestern boundary of Netherfield as it was later known when it became a separate ecclesiastical parish in 1885. This line was joined by the Ambergate, Nottingham, Boston and Eastern Junction Railway line from Grantham and the Colwick Motive Power Depot (1869 - 13 April 1970).

Covering an area, as today from the north end of Victoria Road just passing the crossings of the former Nottingham - Gedling - Daybrook line, the eastern end of Gedling up to Rectory Junction Viaduct covering an area, end to end of one and a half to two miles (3 km).

During this time the population of Netherfield greatly increased from 60 in 1801 to 2,648 in 1891, with a further increase to 4,646 by 1901. Rows of terraced Victorian houses were built to accommodate them. These terraces are characteristic of Netherfield. After the closure of Colwick Depot the population did drop slightly due to unemployment and businesses closing, but began to increase during the early 1980s. Despite its small size, Netherfield still has its own Netherfield railway station. Carlton station is less than a mile away on the Nottingham - Lincoln line. The local schools are the Carlton Netherfield Junior and Infants schools. The nearest secondary school is the Carlton le Willows Academy. There is a large Morrisons store on Victoria Parkway near the A612 road.

Netherfield was the target of Zeppelin bombing in 1916 during the First World War. On 25 September 1916, a zeppelin raid led by Kapitänleutnant Kraushaar dropped bombs in a line from Newark to the city centre. A single bomb was dropped on the corner of Cross Street and Dunstan Street obliterating six houses. The houses were not rebuilt and the site was used as a children's play park. In 2018 six new houses were built on the site and this is now known as Dunstan Court. Netherfield was historically located in Carlton Urban District until 1974 under the Local Government Act 1972 the area was abolished and incorporated into the Borough of Gedling. Today the industrial town spans upon 2 miles streched along the River Trent up to Carlton railway station.

== Bus transport ==
Nottingham City Transport

- 44: Nottingham – Sneinton Hermitage – Colwick – Netherfield – Gedling.
- 44A: Nottingham – Sneinton Hermitage – Colwick Industrial Estate – Netherfield – Gedling.
- 45 : Nottingham – Nottingham Racecourse P&R – Colwick Industrial Estate – Victoria Retail Park - Gedling - Cartlton.

Nottingham Minibus & Coaches

- 773: Netherfield Morrisons – Netherfield – Carlton – Bakersfield.
- 774: Netherfield Morrisons – Netherfield – Carlton – Gedling - Carlton Square - Netherfield > Netherfield Morrisons
- 775: Netherfield Morrisons – Nethefield – Stoke Bardolph – Burton Joyce.
- N73: Mapperley – Carlton Valley – Netherfield - Netherfield Morrisons
