= Ambergate, Nottingham and Boston and Eastern Junction Railway =

UK railway company

The Ambergate, Nottingham and Boston and Eastern Junction Railway (AN&B&EJR) was a British railway company, which hoped to connect Lancashire with the port of Boston, in Lincolnshire, England. It was authorised in 1846 but was unable to raise much money. It opened a standard gauge line from a junction near Nottingham to Grantham in 1853. At Nottingham it was to rely on the Midland Railway, but that company was hostile and obstructive.

The Ambergate company was leased to the Great Northern Railway in 1855, and they built their own Nottingham station, opened in 1857. In 1860 the company changed its name to the Nottingham and Grantham Railway and Canal Company. In 1875 the Great Northern Railway opened a line into Derbyshire and the former Nottingham to Grantham line became an important trunk route, particularly for goods and mineral traffic.

The original line from Colwick to Grantham is still in use as the Nottingham–Grantham line. The freight traffic has greatly diminished, but the line is used for long distance passenger trains between Liverpool and Norwich, as well as from Nottingham to Skegness.

== Origins ==
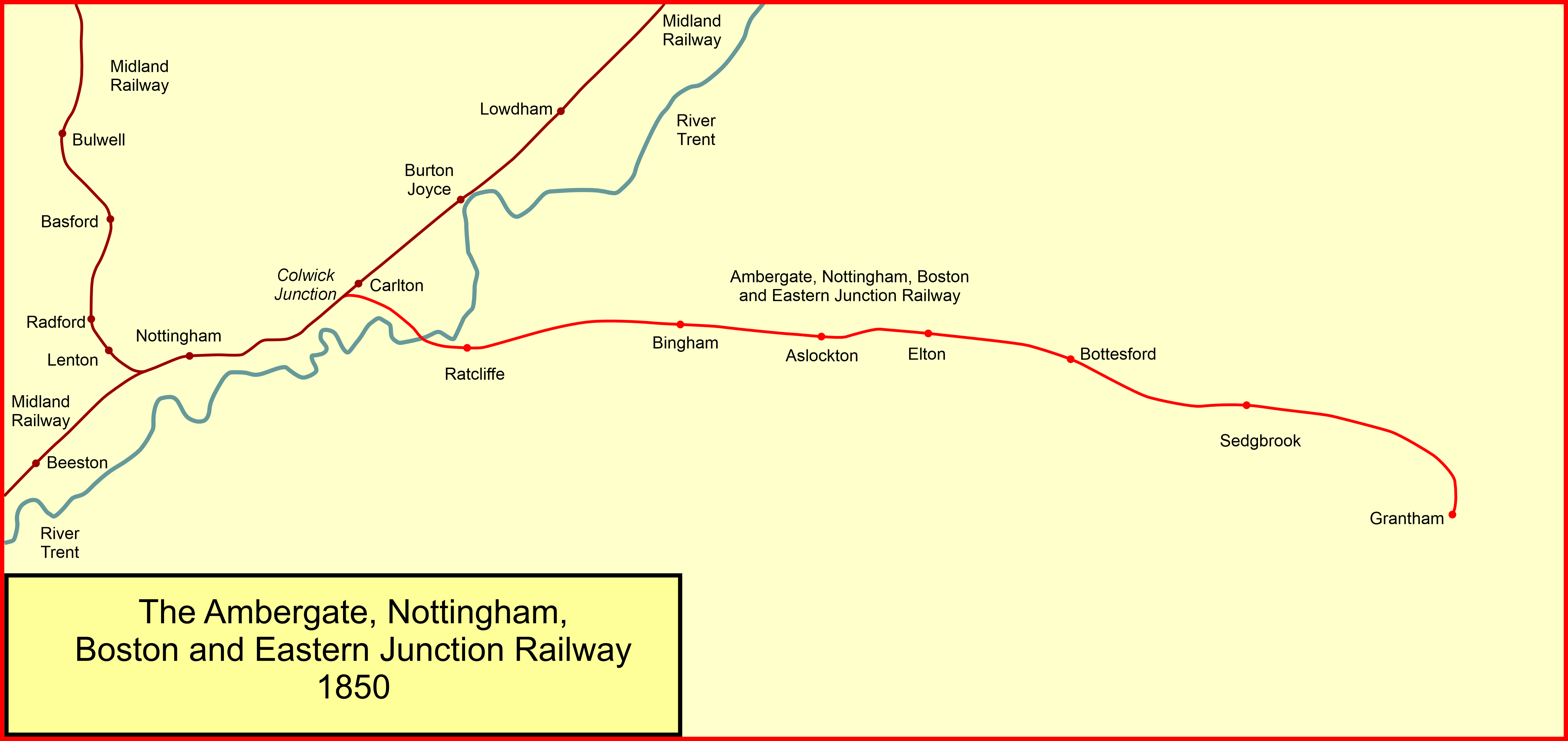
The Ambergate line in 1850

In the speculative days of railway mania, many railways were proposed and much investors' money was committed to railway schemes. Surveys were carried out, and parliamentary draughtsmen were employed, not always prudently.

Ambergate, Nottingham and Boston and Eastern Junction Railway Act 1846
- Act of Parliament
- Parliament of the United Kingdom
- Long title: An Act for making a Railway from or near the Ambergate Station of the Midland Railway, through Nottingham, to Spalding and Boston, with Branches therefrom, and for enabling the Company to purchase the Nottingham and Grantham Canals.
- Citation: 9 & 10 Vict. c. clv

Dates
- Royal assent: 16 July 1846

Ambergate, Nottingham and Boston and Eastern Junction Railway Amendment Act 1847
- Act of Parliament
- Parliament of the United Kingdom
- Long title: An Act to enable the Ambergate, Nottingham, and Boston and Eastern Junction Railway Company to alter the line of their Railway, and to construct a Branch Railway therefrom into the Town of Nottingham.
- Citation: 10 & 11 Vict. c. lxxviii

Dates
- Royal assent: 2 July 1847

Text of statute as originally enacted

The Ambergate, Nottingham and Boston and Eastern Junction Railway was authorised on 16 July 1846 by the Ambergate, Nottingham and Boston and Eastern Junction Railway Act 1846 (9 & 10 Vict. c. clv) to build a line linking the manufacturing districts of Lancashire with the collieries of Nottinghamshire, and the port of Boston, Lincolnshire. A partner in this scheme was the Manchester, Buxton, Matlock and Midland Junction Railway, authorised on the same day. It was to connect Cheadle (now Cheadle Hulme) on the London and North Western Railway south of Stockport, and Ambergate. The AN&B&EJR was itself a combination of two railways authorised in the 1845 session of Parliament, but not yet built: the Nottingham, Erewash Valley and Ambergate Railway, and the Nottingham, Vale of Belvoir and Grantham Railway.

By the act, the Grantham Canal and the Nottingham Canal companies were to be acquired by the Ambergate company on completion of certain administrative processes.

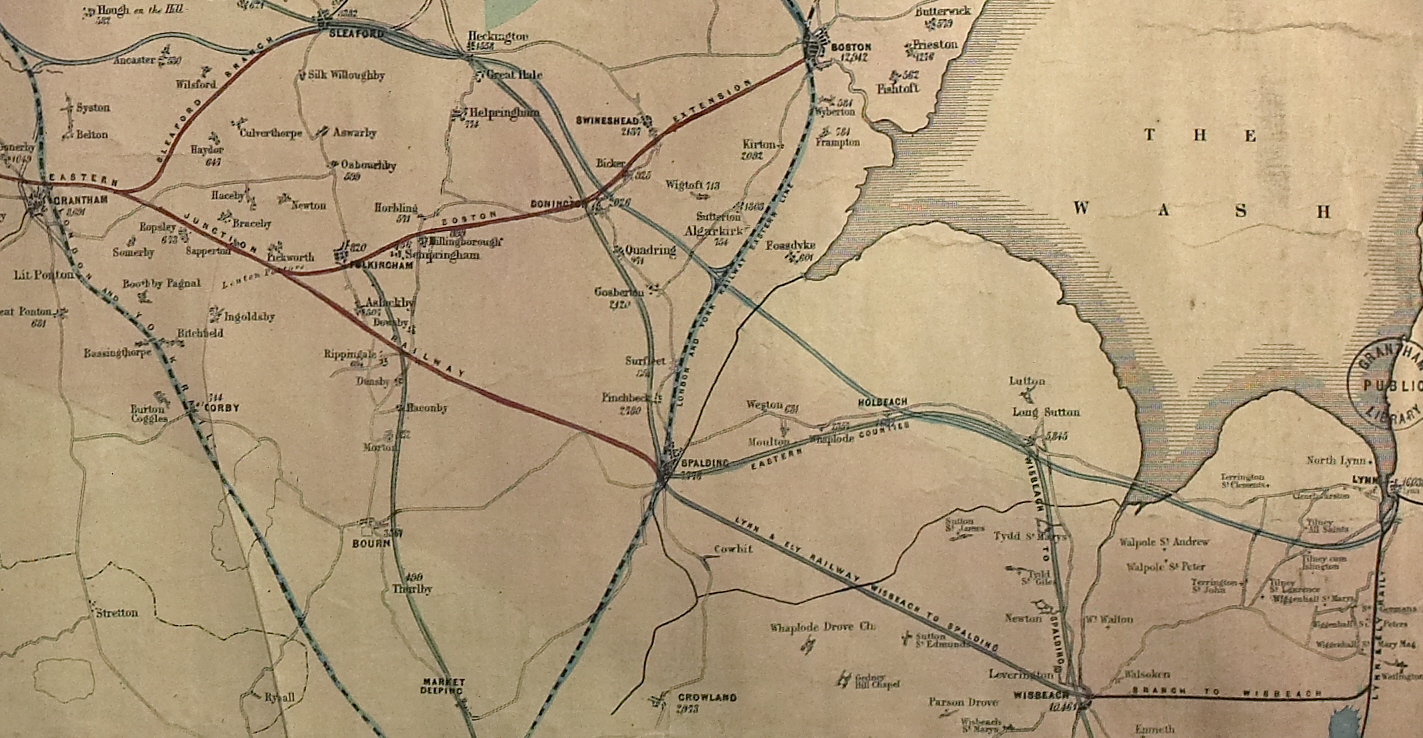
Fragment of a map of the proposed route showing the connections to Spalding and the Eastern Counties. It is clear that the junction with the Great Northern was not the final objective.

In 1839 the Midland Counties Railway had opened a line at Nottingham; the station there was at Carrington Street. (Note: The present-day station was built in 1904.) In 1844 the company merged with others and formed the Midland Railway, and in 1846 its line to Lincoln was opened.

The through route would rely on running over the Midland Railway from Bulwell to Colwick, a distance of about 7 miles (11 km) crossing Nottingham. (Note: The last 4 miles (6 km) into Nottingham from Ambergate would be joint with the Midland, and the first three miles out towards Colwick would be on the Midland Railway's Lincoln branch, according to Wrottesley, volume 1 page 69)

== Construction and opening ==
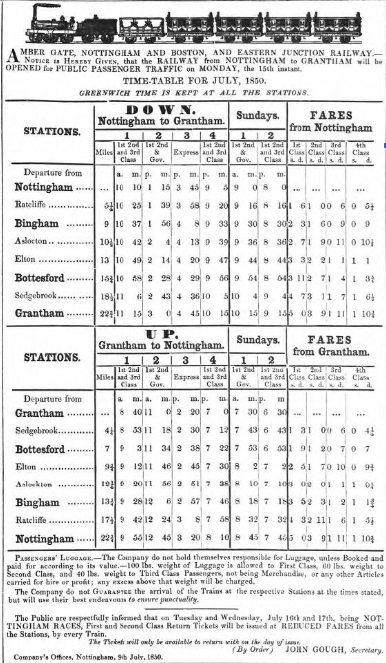
Timetable of the services for July 1850 from the Nottinghamshire Guardian, Thursday 11 July 1850

Following the peak of the railway mania, there was a collapse in confidence in railway schemes, and money was almost impossible to come by for some time. In 1849 Parliament granted an extension of time, and permitted the proposed lines west of Nottingham and east of Grantham to be abandoned. The company managed to build from Colwick Junction (where it left the Midland Railway's Nottingham to Lincoln line) to a temporary station at Grantham adjacent to the canal basin near Dysart Road. The Great Northern Railway was being constructed at the time but had not reached Grantham yet. Sidings and a warehouse were constructed at Colwick. The engineer was John Underwood.

The double-track line opened for passengers on 15 July 1850, with goods trains starting one week later. There were four trains each way daily, with two on Sundays. E B Wilson & Co were the contractors for working the line at first, but Neale & Wilson of Grantham took over after a period. (Note: Leleux says (page 124) "The initial service of four trains each way daily proved too optimistic, being reduced to one daily after a fortnight." This seems an extraordinary move.) For two years it was the only railway at Grantham.

== Prospective purchasers ==
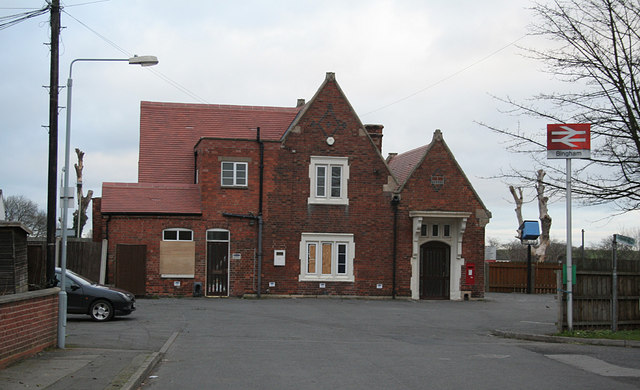
Bingham railway station

Notwithstanding its shaky finances, the Ambergate line was an attractive potential acquisition for a larger company. The Great Northern Railway had offered to purchase it as soon as it was authorised as it would give useful access to Nottinghamshire, but the line's own directors refused, expecting its value to increase. Now in April 1851 the London and North Western Railway and the Midland Railway, working together, offered to acquire the company, offering 4% on its capital. The directors of the Ambergate company agreed, but the shareholders rejected the offer; this was probably due to the influence of Graham Hutchinson, a director of the GNR: he had foreseen the value of the Ambergate company to the GNR and had acquired a commanding number of shares.

Accordingly on 31 March 1852 the Great Northern company agreed to work the Ambergate company and pay 4% on its paid-up capital. This was agreed to by the proprietors on 19 May 1852, but the Midland Railway, whose offer had been rejected, arranged for an injunction against the proposed working arrangement, arguing that the funds of the GNR ought not to be used for such a purpose. The injunction was granted, and the intended arrangement could not proceed.

== A battle at Nottingham ==
The Ambergate company had been using a temporary station at the Old Canal Wharf at Grantham, waiting for the Great Northern Railway to open the main (joint) station in the town. The GNR did so and on 2 August 1852 the Ambergate trains transferred to the GNR station. The old Wharf reverted to goods station status. The GNR advertised a through passenger service from London to Nottingham, which was quicker than the existing LNWR and Midland Railway service. This was a through coach off the 11 a.m. departure from London King's Cross, (Note: Actually the Maiden Lane temporary station, which was referred to as "King's Cross" at the time.) and the train was drawn by a GNR locomotive when it arrived at Nottingham. The Midland Railway management considered that this was in breach of the injunction, and forced the arriving locomotive into a disused shed at Nottingham, and removed the rails giving access to it. The GNR went to litigation; they had only hired the locomotive out to the Ambergate company, who were working the train with their own men. However the outcome of the legal proceedings was not decisive, and it was some considerable time before the locomotive was released.

The Midland Railway continued obstructive measures at Nottingham, and when through goods traffic from Nottingham to the Great Northern Railway system arrived on 19 August, it had to be carted to Colwick. Finally on 24 May 1853 a traffic pooling arrangement was agreed, and the hostility cooled off.

== Nottingham access, and working by the Great Northern Railway ==
Ambergate Railway (Nottingham Extension and Station) Act 1854
- Act of Parliament
- Parliament of the United Kingdom
- Long title: An Act to authorise the Extension by the Ambergate, Nottingham, and Boston and Eastern Junction Railway Company of their Line of Railway into the Town of Nottingham, the Formation of a Station there; and for other Purposes.
- Citation: 17 & 18 Vict. c. cxxxviii

Dates
- Royal assent: 3 July 1854

Text of statute as originally enacted

Ambergate Railway (Reduction of Capital) Act 1854
- Act of Parliament
- Parliament of the United Kingdom
- Long title: An Act to amend the Acts relating to the Ambergate, Nottingham, and Boston and Eastern Junction Railway Company, and to authorize the Reduction and Regulation of and certain Arrangements as to the Capital of the said Company; and for other Purposes.
- Citation: 17 & 18 Vict. c. clxxi

Dates
- Royal assent: 24 July 1854

Text of statute as originally enacted

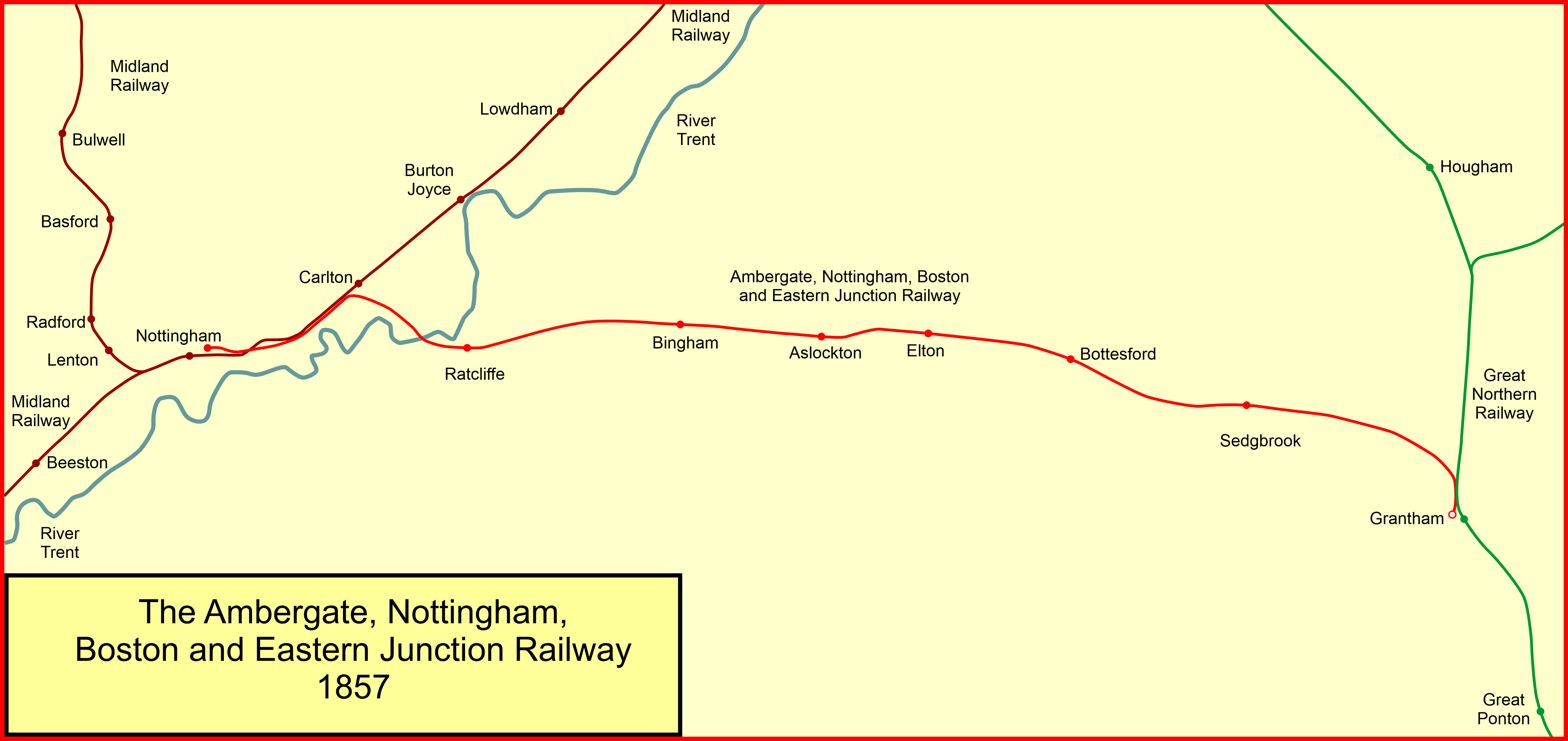
The Ambergate line in 1857

The Nottingham situation was intolerable, and in 1853 the Ambergate company applied for an act of Parliament for an independent line from Colwick into Nottingham. This failed in Parliament, but the following year a similar bill was passed as the Ambergate Railway (Nottingham Extension and Station) Act 1854 (17 & 18 Vict. c. cxxxviii) on 3 July 1854. The Ambergate company could build a 2-mile-61-chain (4.45 km) line from Colwick to a station in East Croft near London Road, together with a connection to the Midland Railway there.

That the Lines of Railway, Station, Approaches, and other Works o be made and executed under the Authority of this Act shall be the following; that is to say,

- First, an Extension or Branch Railway from the Main Line of Railway of the Company, commencing by a Junction with such Main Line, in the Parish of Colwick, in the County of Nottingham, in the same County, and terminating in a Piece of Land called the East Croft, in the Parish of Saint Mary in the Town and County of the Town of Nottingham, near to the Nottingham Canal:
- Secondly, a Junction Railway from the said intended Extension Railway to the Midland Railway in the Parishes of Sneinton, otherwise Snenton, and Saint Mary, or One of them:
- Thirdly, a Station in or upon a Portion of the East Croft aforesaid in the same Parish of Saint Mary, with all requisite Approaches, Conveniences, and Works.
— Section 5, Ambergate Railway (Nottingham Extension and Station) Act 1854 (17 & 18 Vict. c. cxxxviii)

Great Northern and Ambergate Railway Companies (Working Arrangements) Act 1854
- Act of Parliament
- Parliament of the United Kingdom
- Long title: An Act to authorise the Extension by the Ambergate, Nottingham, and Boston and Eastern Junction Railway Company of their Line of Railway into the Town of Nottingham, the Formation of a Station there; and for other Purposes.
- Citation: 17 & 18 Vict. c. ccxiv

Dates
- Royal assent: 3 July 1854

Text of statute as originally enacted

The Ambergate company obtained a second act of Parliament, the Great Northern and Ambergate Railway Companies (Working Arrangements) Act 1854 (17 & 18 Vict. c. ccxiv) on 31 July 1854, allowing it to agree with the GNR to work the line or to lease it. The Midland secured a clause giving the Ambergate or the GNR five years to build their own station at Nottingham: the Midland station at Nottingham was not to be used by the Ambergate or the GNR (except for traffic working through to the west of Nottingham) after five years from the passing of the Act or when the Ambergate's own station was opened. The GNR and the Ambergate company agreed the working arrangement on 30 March 1855, effective three months later. (Note: Wrottesley; Leleux says "for 999 years as from 2 April 1855".)

The new Nottingham station opened on 3 October 1857; it was called Nottingham London Road, and consisted of two passenger platforms with four intervening sidings. The company transferred its offices there in addition. There was a new engine shed, and the ancillary buildings were ready by March 1858. The connection to the Midland Railway at Colwick was severed by July 1857. The GNR paid for the installation of the electric telegraph on the line. From the opening of London Road, the GNR operated an omnibus service to the Midland station, and operated its own cartage in the town. (Note: Nottingham gained city status in 1897.)

Anderson describes the London Road Low Level station:

[London Road] High Level station paled architecturally in comparison with the grand old Low Level terminus which faced it across a forecourt and service road. Though similarly constructed in red brick, the earlier building had an immensely complex frontage incorporating ample and vigorous stone embellishments such as balustrades, cornices and dripstones. Ornate gables and parapets were decorated with diaper patterning, the roof was crowned by a truncated spire capped with ornamental railings, and a projecting porte-cochere provided cover for waiting road carriages.

Nottingham and Grantham Railway and Canal Act 1860
- Act of Parliament
- Parliament of the United Kingdom
- Long title: An Act for changing the Name of "The Ambergate, Nottingham, and Boston and Eastern Junction Railway and Canal Company" to the Name "The Nottingham and Grantham Railway and Canal Company," and for reducing and regulating their Capital and borrowing Powers; and for other Purposes.
- Citation: 23 & 24 Vict. c. xxxvi

Dates
- Royal assent: 15 May 1860

Text of statute as originally enacted

The Ambergate company changed its name to the Nottingham and Grantham Railway and Canal Company by the Nottingham and Grantham Railway and Canal Act 1860 (23 & 24 Vict. c. xxxvi) of 15 May 1860. Soon afterwards the GNR exercised its option to lease the company. The annual rental was 4.125% on capital of £1,014,000. The agreement gave the GNR the right to purchase outright on payment of the capital at par, but this was never done.

== Derbyshire Extension Railway ==
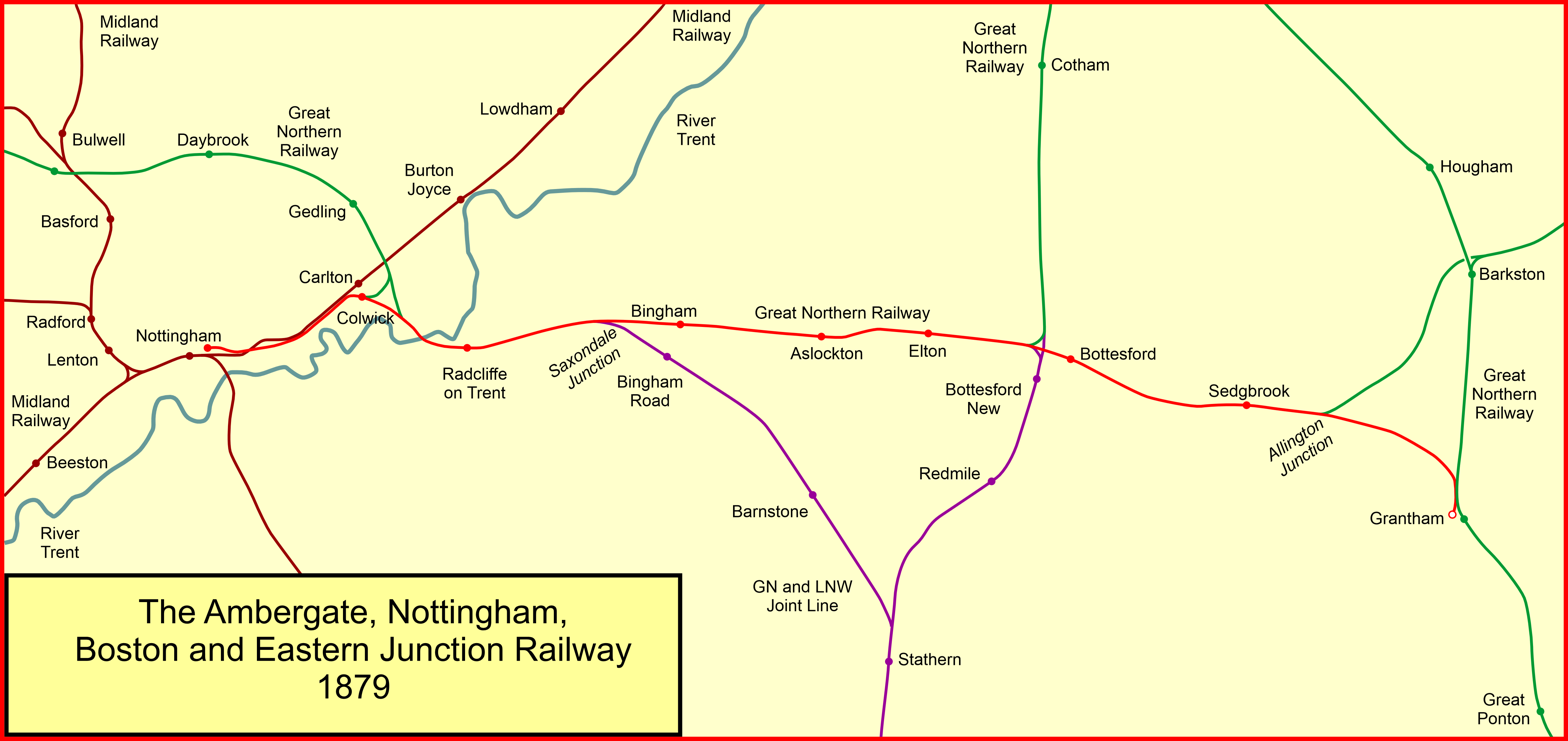
The Ambergate line in 1879

The Great Northern Railway got its Derbyshire Extension Bill through Parliament as the Great Northern Railway (Derbyshire and Staffordshire) Act 1872 (35 & 36 Vict. c. cxxxix); it was mainly intended for mineral traffic. It left Colwick by a triangular junction, and swept round the north of Nottingham through Ilkeston and Derby as far as Burton upon Trent. It opened in 1875, and consolidated the position of Colwick as an important goods and mineral marshalling yard and depot.

== Avoiding Grantham ==
By the Great Northern Railway (Additional Powers) Act 1873 (36 & 37 Vict. c. xc) of 7 July 1873 the GNR obtained powers to construct the Sedgebrook and Barkstone Junction line. (The railway used the spelling "Barkstone" until December 1916.) This was built with the main aim of simplifying the movement of coal from Nottinghamshire to Lincolnshire without reversal at Grantham. It was originally planned to extend from Allington Junction, near Sedgebrook on the Nottingham and Grantham line, to a junction with the main line at Barkston, south of the junction with the Boston and Sleaford line. However on 10 January 1874 a passenger train from Boston overran signals at that junction, and fouled the path of an up Anglo-Scottish express service. The engine of the express struck the branch train's carriages and then grazed wagons of a passing down train. The fireman and a passenger were killed. As a result it was decided to take the new line under the main line north of Barkston station and make the junction directly with the Boston line, a deviation authorised by the Great Northern Railway Act 1875 (38 & 39 Vict. c. cx) of 29 June 1875.

Barkston branch—

- A Railway (No. 2) three miles three furlongs two chains and twenty links in length, and wholly in the parts of Kesteven in Lincolnshire, commencing near the spot where the Nottingham and Grantham branch of the Great Northern Railway crosses on the level the public road leading from Barrowby to Allington in the parish of Barrowby, and terminating in the parish of Barkston by a junction with the main line of the Great Northern Railway, near the spot where that railway crosses on the level the public road leading from Barkston to Marston.
— Section 5, Great Northern Railway (Additional Powers) Act 1873 (36 & 37 Vict. c. xc)

A railway (2 miles and 2 chains in length), wholly in the parts of Kesteven and county of Lincoln, commencing in the parish of Gonerby by a junction with railway No. 2, authorised by "The Great Northern Railway (Additional Powers) Act, 1873," at a point shown on the plans deposited with the clerk of the peace for the said parts of Kesteven, in respect of the application to Parliament for the said Act as two miles or thereabouts from the authorised commencement of the said railway, passing thence through the parishes of Marston and Syston, and terminating in the parish of Barkston by a junction with the Boston, Sleaford, and Midland Counties line of the Great Northern Railway at a point about 37 chains measured along the said line from the junction thereof with the main line of the Great Northern Railway at Barkston. And the Company may abandon so much of the said authorised railway No. 2 as was intended to be constructed between the commencement of the proposed railway herein-before described and the authorised termination of the said railway No. 2 at its junction with the main line of the Great Northern Railway. — Section 5, Great Northern Railway Act 1875 (38 & 39 Vict. c. cx)

The new bridge was completed on 18 January 1875; the line was made double-track, 4 miles 3 chains (6.50 km) from Allington Junction to Barkston East Junction. The line opened on 29 October 1875, with three freight trains each way daily; it was soon used extensively in summer by passenger trains from Nottingham and Leicester to the resort town of Skegness. There were no intermediate stations or signal boxes but the long section was broken in May 1883 by opening a signal box at Marston, 1 1/2 miles (2.4 km) from Allington Junction.

The route became used later when Skegness and Mablethorpe became popular seaside destinations, and excursion traffic developed. Between 1919 and 1939 evening excursions were run from Nottingham to Skegness, and were so popular that on many days six such trains were run.

On 3 October 2005 an eastern chord line was made at Allington, enabling trains from Grantham to reach the Boston line without running on the main line. The connection to the main line at Barkston was subsequently removed.

== Bottesford lines ==
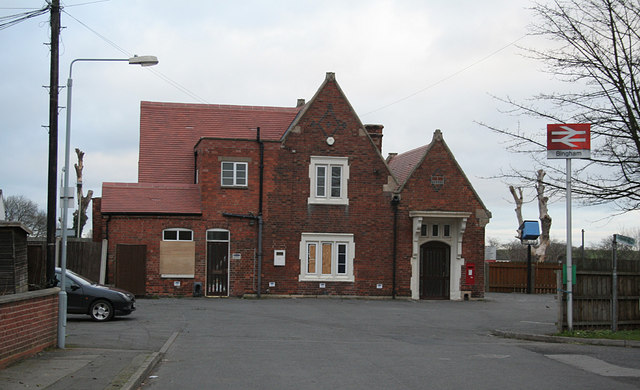
Bingham Railway Station

In 1878 the Great Northern Railway completed its Bottesford and Newark line, leading north from Bottesford, chiefly built for mineral traffic. The following year the Great Northern and London and North Western Joint Railway was opened, connecting Market Harborough with the Nottingham and Grantham line, at Bottesford and at Saxondale, further west. The lines were not successful commercially, and closed from 1953.

== Woolsthorpe branch ==
A mineral line was built from Belvoir Junction, on the Nottingham and Grantham line a little west of Sedgebrook, to ironstone workings at Woolsthorpe, near a wharf on the Grantham Canal. It was authorised by the Great Northern Railway Act 1882 (45 & 46 Vict. c. cxci) on 10 August 1882. The contract for construction had already been let on 6 July to Lovatt, for £14,000. It was a single line, 2 miles 76 chains (4.75 km) in extent. Ironstone traffic over it began on 29 June 1883.

Woolsthorp Branch.—A railway (2 miles 7 furlongs 7 chains in length) commencing in the parish of Muston in the county of Leicester by a junction with the Nottingham and Grantham line of the Company near the Belvoir signal box on that railway and terminating in the parish of Woolsthorpe in the parts of Kesteven in Lincolnshire in a field known as the Bridge Close belonging or reputed to belong to the Reverend Edward Alfred Gillet. — Section 5, Great Northern Railway Act 1882 (45 & 46 Vict. c. cxci)

There were extensive ironstone deposits in the area, exploited by opencast mining, and the GNR soon extended the line a further three miles an ironstone pit near to Harston, forming the Woolsthorpe Branch Extension. In the 1940s a branch from the Woolsthorpe line was made to Harlaxton, south of Denton, reaching further iron workings. When the ironstone industry declined in the area, the line was closed, between 1974 and 1977.

== Nottingham stations ==
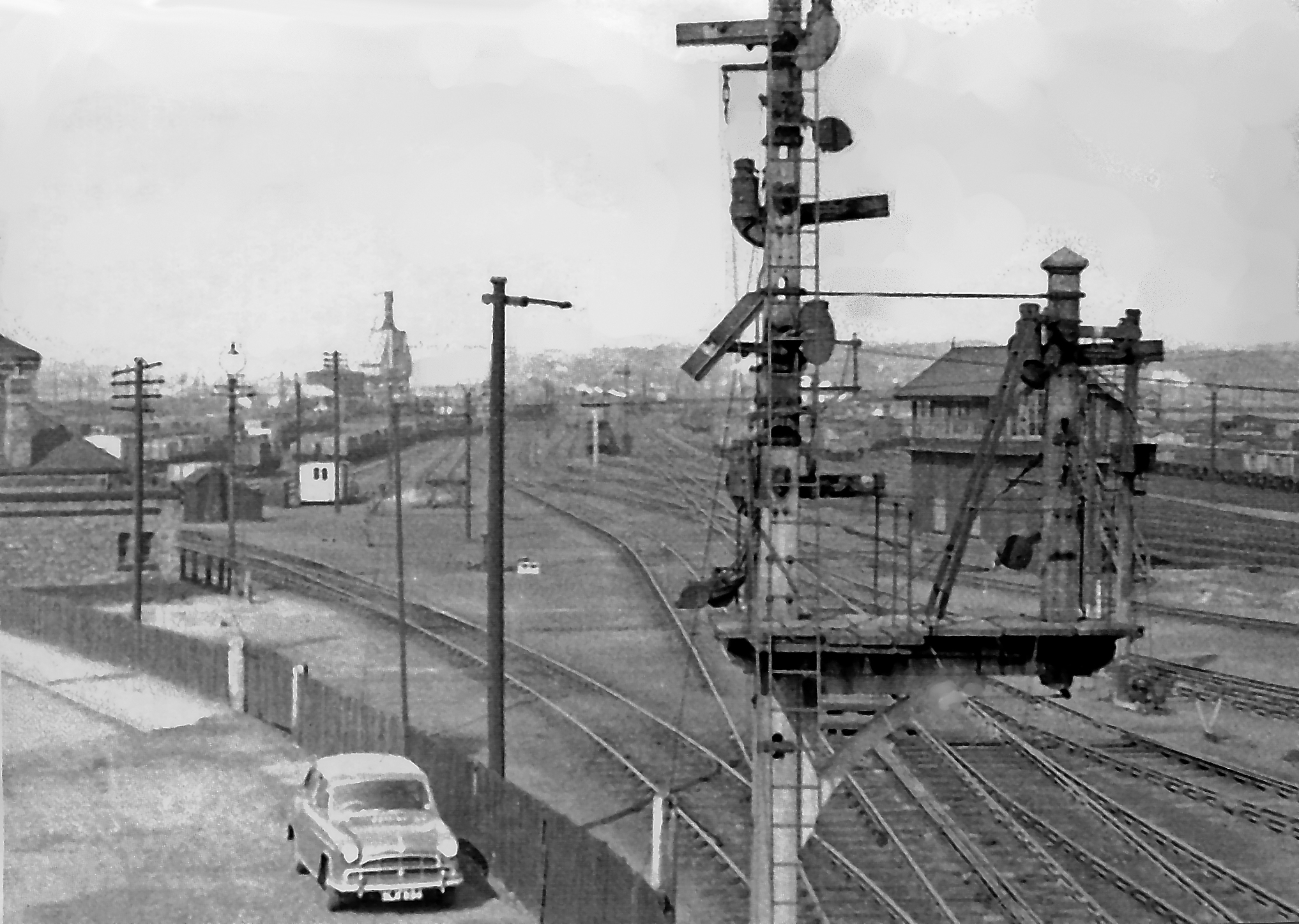
the vast ex-LNER Colwick Yards in 1956

In 1900 almost all the GNR services were transferred to Nottingham London Road High Level station; only one daily and one Wednesday-only GNR departure remained. Five LNWR trains to Northampton continued to use the station. although it was not until 22 May 1944 that the station was completely closed to passenger traffic.

The Manchester, Sheffield and Lincolnshire Railway planned a London extension, and this cut through the centre of Nottingham. The Great Central Railway, as it became, had a "grandiose" new station, named Nottingham Victoria, opened on 24 May 1900. The Great Northern Railway had participated in this scheme and made a connection to the new line, and opened a through station, London Road High Level, on the connecting line.

== Connections east of Nottingham ==
After 1948 summer excursion traffic was run between industrial towns like Alfreton and Coalville to the Lincolnshire seaside resorts. Running through Nottingham Midland station, they could not run direct on to the former GNR line, but had to reverse into London Road yard to do so, a process that consumed 30 minutes. In 1965 the original Ambergate Railway connection at Colwick Junction was restored, obviating the problem. When Nottingham Victoria station closed in 1967, the Grantham line trains transferred into Nottingham Midland station, using this connection and the former Midland line from there. The Ambergate tracks from Colwick Junction to Nottingham were taken up.

== Cotgrave Colliery branch ==
In 1960 a 2-mile (3 km) branch was constructed to serve a new deep mine, Cotgrave Colliery; the colliery itself started production in 1962. The branch left the Nottingham to Grantham line by a triangular junction a little east of Colwick Yard and ran south; a significant concrete viaduct was necessary to cross the flood plain south of the River Trent. Most of the railborne output of the colliery went to Ratcliffe-on-Soar Power Station. The east chord of the junction was little used, and not used at all after 1973; it was formally closed in May 1976. The colliery closed in 1993 and the line closed with it.

== Radcliffe test track ==
In 1968 a section of concrete slab track was installed near Radcliffe station. As well as plain line, two turnouts on curves were inserted. The purpose was to text the durability of alternative fastening systems. The experiment was considered complete in 1970, but the track was not reverted for some time.

== Radcliffe Viaduct ==
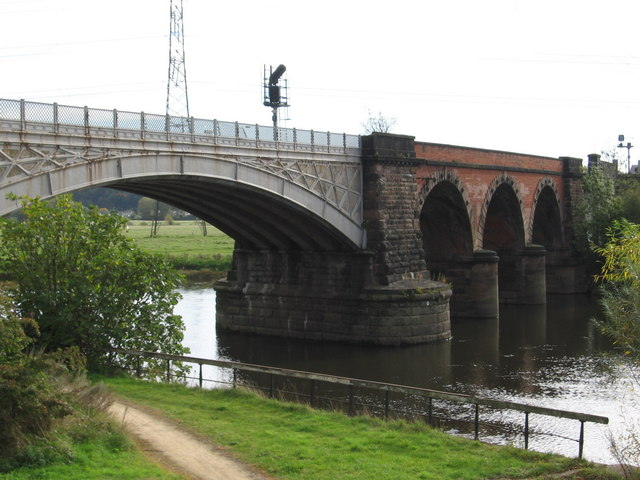
Radcliffe Viaduct

The most significant engineering feature on the line was the Radcliffe Viaduct. It has been described thus:

The viaduct carries the double-track Grantham–Nottingham railway line across the River Trent and is an interesting example of a cast-iron arch bridge that has been converted to a reinforced concrete bridge with little alteration to its general appearance... The Trent Navigation Company insisted on one span of at least 100 ft [30 m]. In the event a 110 ft [34 m] arch, cast by Clayton & Shuttleworth of Lincoln, was used across the north-western half of the river, the other half being spanned by three brick arches with stone voussoirs and abutments. The headroom above normal water level is about 24 ft [7.3 m]; the arch rise is 11 ft 6 in [3.5 m]. The arch had six ribs, 3 ft [0.9 m] deep in eight segments, the outer faces of the outside ribs having decorative features. Open-pattern spandrels supported the timber deck and the parapets are lattice pattern. Timber approach viaducts were built across the flood plains on each side but that on the north-west side has been replaced by an earth bank and that on the other side by two runs of blue-brick arches, 28 in all. In 1981 the iron ribs of the arch were encased in 28 in [70 cm] wide concrete ribs with solid spandrels, but the outer iron ribs and spandrels have been left visible on the faces of the concrete. All the iron bracing and the timber deck have been replaced by concrete. This radical alteration, however, has been made inconspicuous by painting the exposed iron light grey and the concrete faces (where visible between the apertures of the spandrels) dark blue, so that the external appearance has been preserved, and the modification is noticeable only from close at hand.

== A personal account of early working ==
David Joy, inventor of the steam locomotive valve gear bearing his name, recounted some adventures in the earliest days, when the line was worked by E. B. Wilson and Company under contract to the proprietors. Joy was the locomotive foreman. When he arrived two days before the opening, nothing was ready for him, and no engines were to be found. He prevailed upon the Midland Railway to lend him two Bury Single locomotives.

E. B. Wilson fetched me on a Friday evening in a cab, took me to Arthington Hall to go next evening to open [the] Nottingham and Grantham Railway on the Monday. He had taken it to work by contract at 2s. per mile run. No engines, nothing ready. To Nottingham early Saturday. Midland Railway supplied us with two old Bury's singles to be at Grantham Sunday night. Saturday afternoon over the line with Underwood (engineer), Gough (secretary), and on the contractor's (G. Wythes) engine (ballast), went off the road, not very fast, but a jolly tumble about.

However the first train departed at 9 a.m. with half a dozen second and third class carriages and a number of wagons.

It wasn't long before the first accident in October, 1850:

We had got another engine from Railway Foundry, known as No. 266, and she did "goods"; and Nottingham Goose Fair coming, and a special ordered for Nottingham, I snapped at the chance of driving one of the engines. I don't know how it all came about, but at night I found myself on the leading engine, the other old Bury behind with old Pilkington as driver down at the junction of the Mansfield line at the front of a long line of carriages, on the down main line, which, for the day, was being used to stand lines of trains—the down trains for Mansfield being shunted at the junction on to the up line to the next station. It was pitch dark; and we waited for a signal to go on to Nottingham with our train, and waited long. At last a rustle, and I thought we were going to be liberated by the passing out of the mail to Derby. So watched for her disappearing sideways to the right, but no, I could see her sweeping round and approaching us. And instantly I calculated that she could not have stopped and passed on to the up line at the junction, so must be on our line rushing upon us. It was not many seconds before we found all this true, as we jumped from our engines and rushed forward on the "in" side of the curve, and only just in time, for I saw the flare of the ashpan of the coming engine ripple over the sleepers as she came on, and heard the broken buffers of my own engine wizz over my head. It was only just in time, the next instant our two poor little light Bury engines were one wreck of material in front of the big six-coupled, with a train of twenty crammed carriages behind her. The footplate of my engine disappeared entirely, the firebox of the engine falling in between the legs of the tank—buffers and buffer beams gone altogether. It was an awful experience, and none of us forgot it in a hurry.

The Midland lent some more engines and

one was a little Sharp [the name of the manufacturer]. This little engine was nearly the death of a nephew of one of my directors. He wanted to ride with me on the footplate one night with a special I said, No! We ran down Bingham Bank into a fog — stuck — no weather board. Suddenly we went through the road crossing gates, the bits flew all round us, we knew how to duck.

== Present day ==
The line between Colwick Junction and Grantham is still open to passengers, as part of the Nottingham–Grantham line. There is (2019) typically an hourly train from Liverpool to Norwich, calling at Nottingham and Grantham, and an hourly train from Nottingham to Skegness, calling at intermediate stations on the line.

== Stations and landmarks ==
- Nottingham London Road; opened 3 October 1857; renamed Nottingham London Road Low Level 1899; closed 22 May 1944;
- Nottingham Racecourse; opened 19 August 1892; not timetabled; closed 8 December 1959;
- Colwick Junction; original point of convergence between Midland Railway and Ambergate Railway; removed 1857; reinstated 1965;
- Colwick West Junction or Netherfield Junction; divergence of Derbyshire Extension line;
- Colwick; opened May 1878; the name used fluctuated between Colwick and Netherfield, but settled on Netherfield by 1878; still open;
- Colwick East Junction; yard access;
- Rectory Junction; convergence of Derbyshire extension line;
- Ratcliffe; opened 15 July 1850; name soon altered to Radcliffe-on-Trent; still open;
- Saxondale Junction; divergence of Melton Mowbray line;
- Bingham; opened 15 July 1850; still open;
- Aslockton; opened 15 July 1850; still open;
- Elton and Orston; opened 15 July 1850; still open;
- Bottesford West and East Junctions;
- Bottesford; opened 15 July 1850; still open;
- Woolsthorpe Junction; divergence of Woolsthorpe branch;
- Sedgebrook; opened 15 July 1850; closed 2 July 1956;
- Allington Junctions; triangular junction for Sleaford;
- Grantham North Junction;
- Grantham Ambergate Yard on spur; known simply as Grantham; opened 15 July 1850; closed to passengers 15 July 1852;
- Grantham; joint GNR and ANB&EJR station; opened 15 July 1852; still open.

== Bibliography ==
- Anderson, P. Howard (1985). Forgotten Railways: volume 2: the East Midlands. Newton Abbot: David St. John Thomas. ISBN 0-946537-20-8.
- Leleux, Robin (1976). A Regional History of the Railways of Great Britain, volume 9: the East Midlands. Newton Abbot: David & Charles. ISBN 0-7153-7165-7.
- Wrottesley, John (1979). The Great Northern Railway, Volume I: Origins and Development. London: B.T. Batsford Limited. ISBN 0-7134-1590-8.
- Wrottesley, John (1979). The Great Northern Railway: volume II: Expansion and Competition. London: B.T. Batsford Limited. ISBN 0-7134-1592-4.
- Wrottesley, John (1981). The Great Northern Railway: volume III: Twentieth Century to Grouping. London: B.T. Batsford Limited. ISBN 0-7134-2183-5.
