= Colwick =

Village and civil parish in Nottinghamshire, England

Coordinates: 52.957°N 1.090°W

- Village, civil parish & suburb
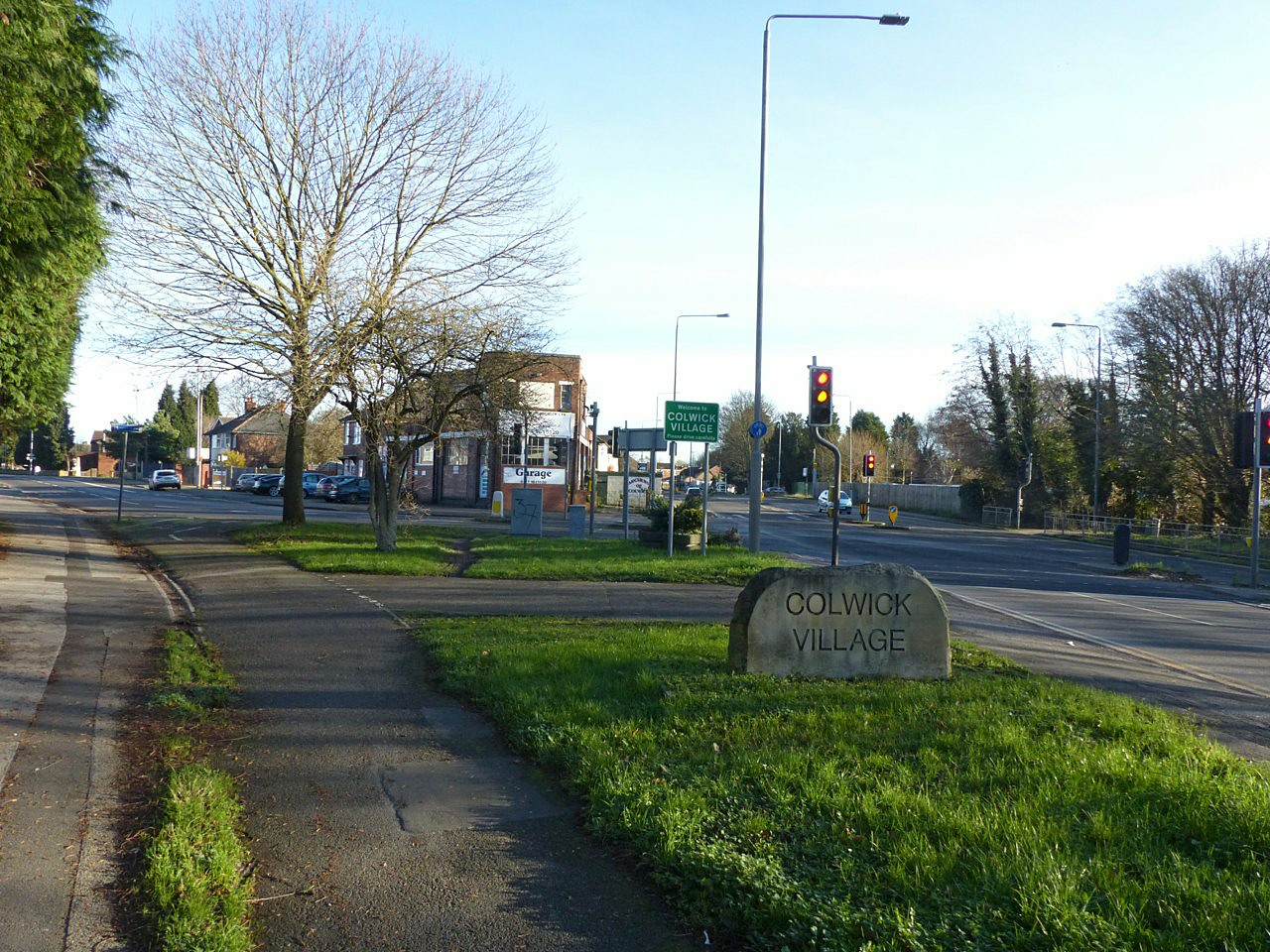
- Village sign

- Location within Nottinghamshire
- Interactive map of Colwick
- Population: 2,778 (2021)
- OS grid reference: SK 61124 40380
- District: Borough of Gedling
- Shire county: Nottinghamshire
- Region: East Midlands
- Country: England
- Sovereign state: United Kingdom
- Post town: NOTTINGHAM
- Postcode district: NG4
- Dialling code: 0115
- Police: Nottinghamshire
- Fire: Nottinghamshire
- Ambulance: East Midlands
- UK Parliament: Gedling
- Website: colwickparishcouncil.gov.uk

Colwick (/ˈkɒlɪk/ KOL-ik) is a village and civil parish, in the Borough of Gedling of Nottinghamshire, England. It is situated to the east of Nottingham's city boundary, and forms the Colwick ward. At the time of the 2011 census, the village had a population of 2,829, falling to 2,778 at the 2021 census.

== History ==
The village is recorded in the Domesday Book of 1086, since when the De-Colwick, Musters and Byron families have all owned the village. The etymology of the place-name is from Old English wic "specialised industrial farm" with an uncertain first element, possibly col "coal", although there have never been coal mines in the area. Another derivation is from the area being a dairy farm.

In 1844, there was a gruesome murder at 'Saville's Spinney', then part of Colwick Park and later part of Colwick Woods. William Saville murdered his wife and three children in the woods on Tuesday 21 May. Their bodies were found one day later by John Swinscoe of Carlton who fetched the parish constable to the spot. An open razor was found in the left hand of the dead woman. The crowd for Saville's execution numbered in the tens of thousands and twelve died in a panic in the moments after Saville was executed.

== Local government ==
Following a campaign by parish councillors, Colwick won the right to be recognised as a village again. The campaign was started because locals believed that village status would be a boost for the community. Highways officials have granted permission for the area to call itself "Colwick Village", similar to Bestwood Village and Gedling Village. It forms part of the Nottinghamshire borough of Gedling. Note that Colwick Country Park, Colwick Hall and Colwick Woods are all in the unitary authority of the City of Nottingham.

== Geography ==
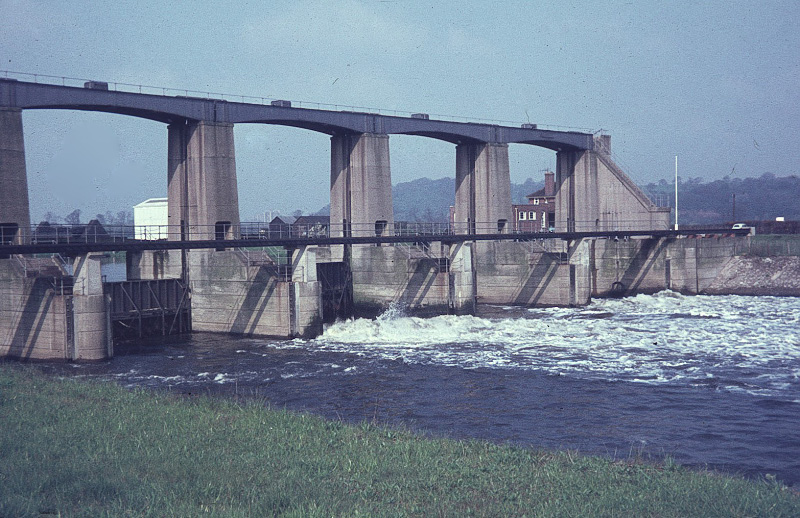
Holme Sluices and lock

Colwick lies between the River Trent and the railway line, with nearby places being Sneinton to the west, Bakersfield (to the north-west), Carlton (to the north), and Netherfield (to the east). Holme Sluices and lock were built in 1950s, as a flood-prevention scheme across the River Trent where the river falls at a weir, allowing for a maximum 13 ft (4 m) range. The Environment Agency have plans to build a fish pass to enable salmon and eels to access 37 mi (60 km) of the upper reaches of the Trent. Some salmon have been known to swim against the flow through the whitewater course at Holme Pierrepont watersport centre.

== Economy ==
Originally an agricultural area, Colwick was notable as the birthplace of Colwick cheese, a soft and creamy curd cheese, allegedly invented in the village in the 17th century. By the 18th century, it was already being made at a number of other locations, persisting in manufacture until the late 20th century. In the 19th century the village became heavily industrialised and was home to many notable firms such as William Lawrence & Co. Ltd, Sands and Spray & Burgass.

== Culture and community ==
Colwick Country Park is a 125 acres (51 hectares) designated Local Nature Reserve on the edge of the village.

== Landmarks ==
Colwick Hall is a large country house that is now a hotel. The Grade II-listed Manor House dates to c1675 with early 19th century additions. The derelict church adjacent to Colwick Hall was used to film the episode of The Upper Hand in which Caroline and Charlie are married.

== Transport ==
The A612 road to Newark runs through the area as the Colwick Loop Road. The railway to Netherfield and Grantham runs alongside the main road but the area has not had a station since the Racecourse station shut in 1959.

=== Bus services ===
Bus services in Colwick, Nottinghamshire
Bus operator	Line	Destination(s)	Notes
Nottingham City Transport	44	Nottingham → Sneinton Hermitage → Colwick → Netherfield → Gedling	
Nottingham City Transport	44A	Nottingham → Sneinton Hermitage → Colwick (Colwick Industrial Estate) → Netherfield → Gedling	
Nottingham City Transport	N26	Nottingham → Colwick (Colwick Loop Road) → Gedling → Burton Joyce → Lowdham → NTU Brackenhurst Campus → Southwell	Line serves at night only.
Nottingham City Transport	45	Nottingham → Racecourse Park & Ride → Colwick (Colwick Industrial Estate) → Victoria Retail Park	

== Education ==
There is a primary school, St. John the Baptist.

== Religion ==
The parish church is dedicated to St. John the Baptist.

== Sport ==
Nottingham Racecourse and Nottingham Greyhound Stadium lie to the west of Colwick.

== Notable people ==
- Mary Chaworth – the first love of Lord Byron – later married Jack Musters of Colwick Hall, creating the Chaworth-Musters dynasty.
