= Nottingham–Grantham line =

Branch line in the East Midlands of England

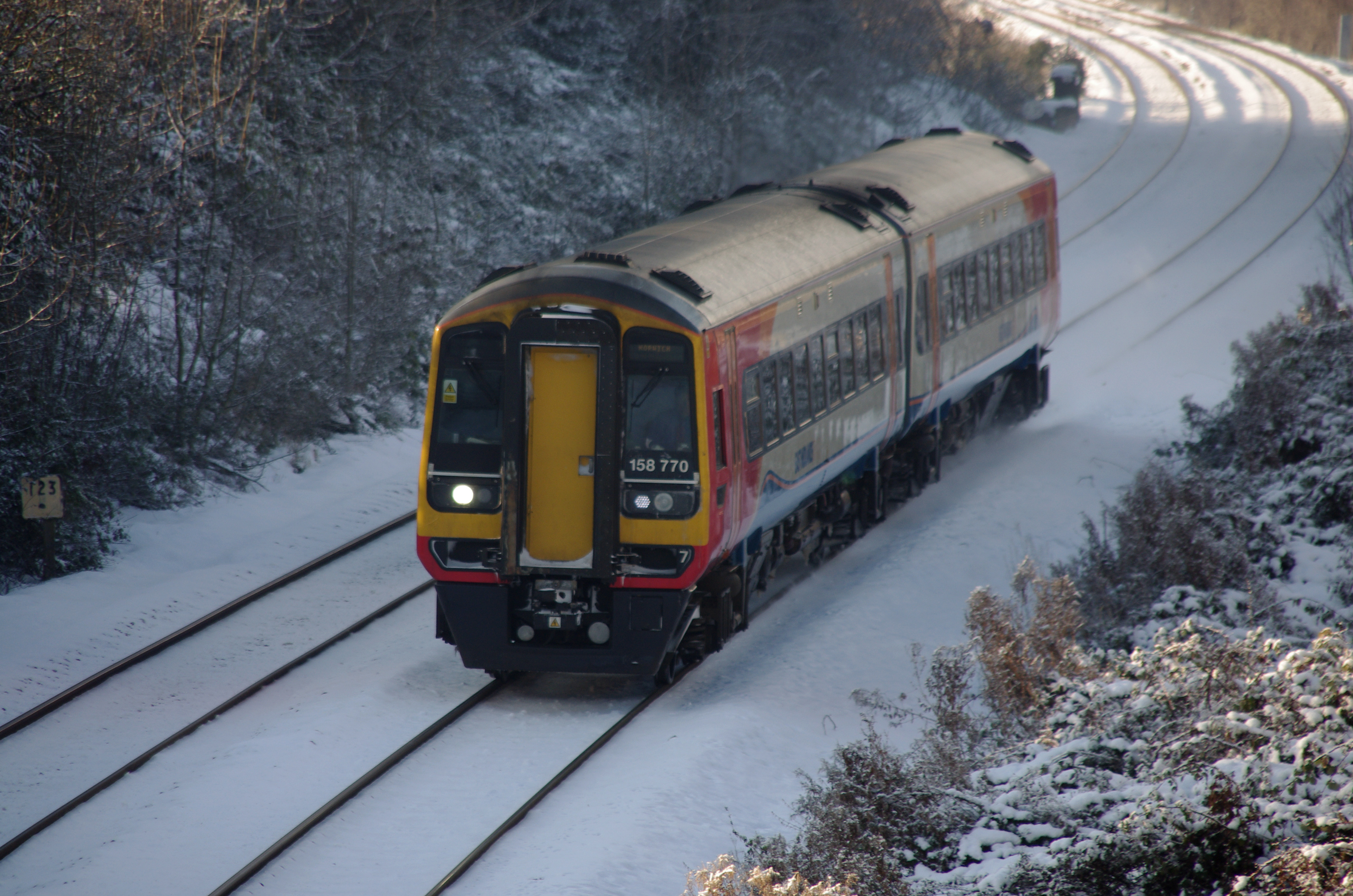
- An East Midlands Trains Class 158 near Radcliffe station in December 2010

Overview
- Status: Operational
- Owner: Network Rail
- Locale: Lincolnshire; Nottinghamshire; East Midlands
- Termini: Nottingham 52.9471°N 1.1467°W; Grantham 52.9067°N 0.6430°W
- Stations: 8

Service
- Type: Heavy rail
- System: National Rail
- Operator: East Midlands Railway
- Rolling stock: Class 170 Turbostar; Class 158 Express Sprinter

History
- Opened: 1850

Technical
- Num of tracks: Two
- Track gauge: 4 ft 8 1/2 in (1,435 mm) standard gauge
Route map
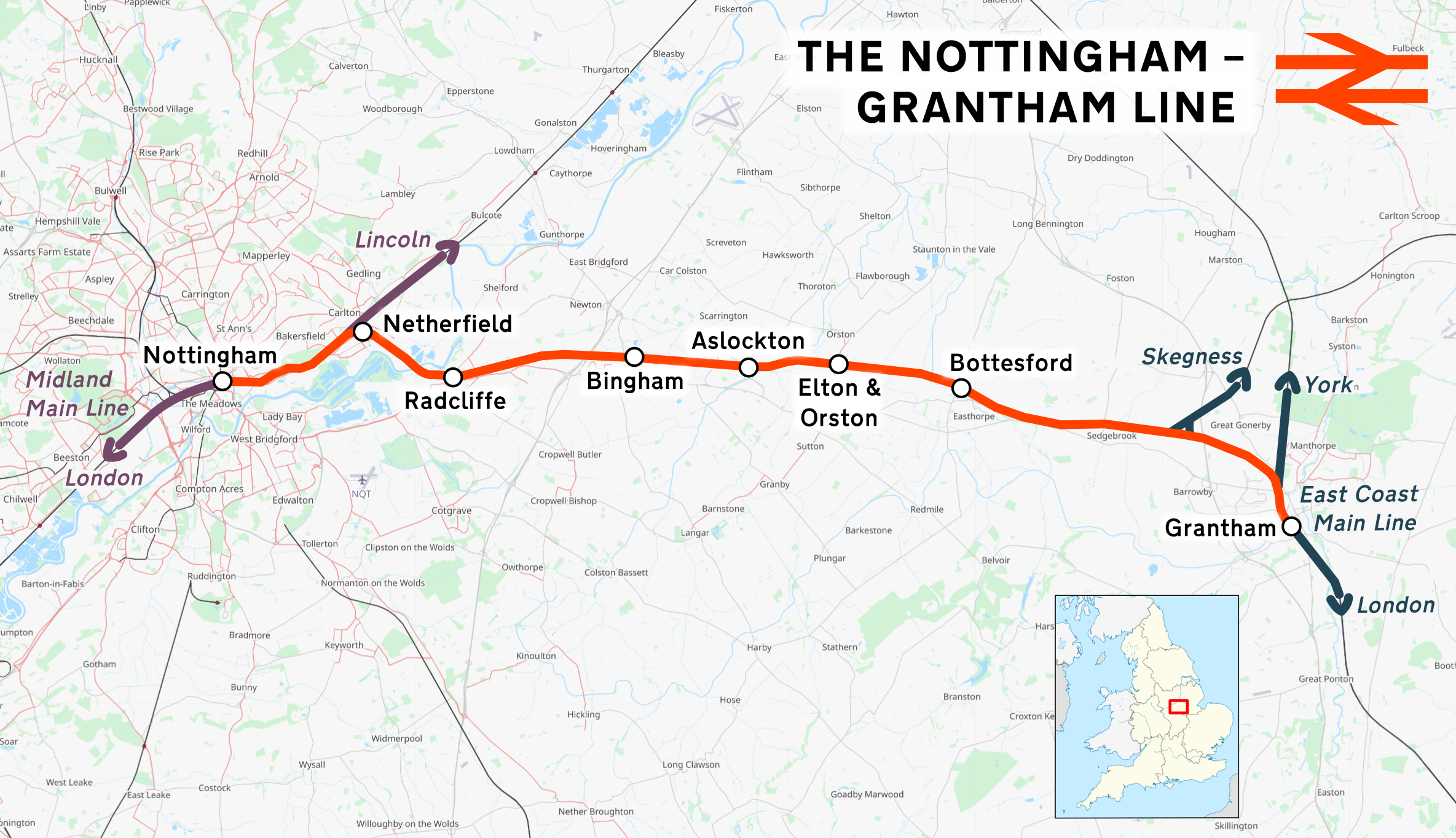
(Click to expand)

The Nottingham–Grantham line is a branch line between the city of Nottingham and the town of Grantham in the East Midlands of England. For most of its length it runs parallel to the A52.

The following places are served by the line:

- Nottingham
- Netherfield and Colwick
- Radcliffe-on-Trent
- Bingham
- Aslockton and Whatton
- Elton and Orston
- Bottesford
- Grantham

== Routes to Skegness ==
At Grantham, the line meets the East Coast Main Line and also the Grantham–Skegness line. Not all Skegness-bound trains stop at Grantham, and the express service (limited stop) has its first stop at Sleaford, splitting from the Grantham line near Allington onto the Grantham Avoiding Line at Allington junction. The journey on this route to Skegness saves 30 minutes of the 2 hours 20 minutes journey via Grantham.

== History ==
The line was initially operated by the Ambergate, Nottingham, Boston and Eastern Junction Railway from 15 July 1850, taken over by the GNR in 1852. At Bottesford, the line was crossed by a north–south LNWR line from Melton Mowbray to Newark-on-Trent (this northern section was owned by GNR). A western spur of this railway (through Barnstone) joined at Saxondale junction.

Services were disrupted in July 2012 when an embankment collapsed near Allington. The line also closed for some six weeks in the summer of 2013, as part of a large-scale improvement to Nottinghamshire's rail network. Skegness councillors were critical of the decision to close the line during the height of the tourist season, but Network Rail, the rail infrastructure company, stated that the summer was the quietest time on the line.

=== Cotgrave Colliery branch ===
The branch to Cotgrave Colliery left the Grantham line at the east end of the viaduct over the River Trent and headed south for about 2 miles (3.2 km). It was built in 1960. The major engineering work was the 360 yards (330 m) long, 30 feet (9.1 m) high, concrete viaduct, formed of 37 spans of about 30 feet (9.1 m) each, where the branch left the main line. Most of the line was on a bank about 21 feet (6.4 m) high, formed of about 300,000 cubic yards (230,000 m^{3}) of fill from a borrow pit alongside the main road. Most of the line was on a 1 in 392 gradient, with 1,030 yards (940 m) at 1 in 199. The colliery closed in 1993 and the track was lifted in 2012.

== Services ==
All services on the line are provided by East Midlands Railway. There is an hourly service in each direction between Liverpool Lime Street and Norwich, generally calling only at Nottingham and Grantham, and an hourly service in each direction between Nottingham and Skegness, via Grantham, calling at most stations along the route. Very few trains serve Netherfield or Elton and Orston. These services are usually formed of Class 158 Express Sprinter or Class 170 Turbostar DMUs.
