= List of public art in Nottingham =

Public art in Nottinghamshire including photographs and descriptions

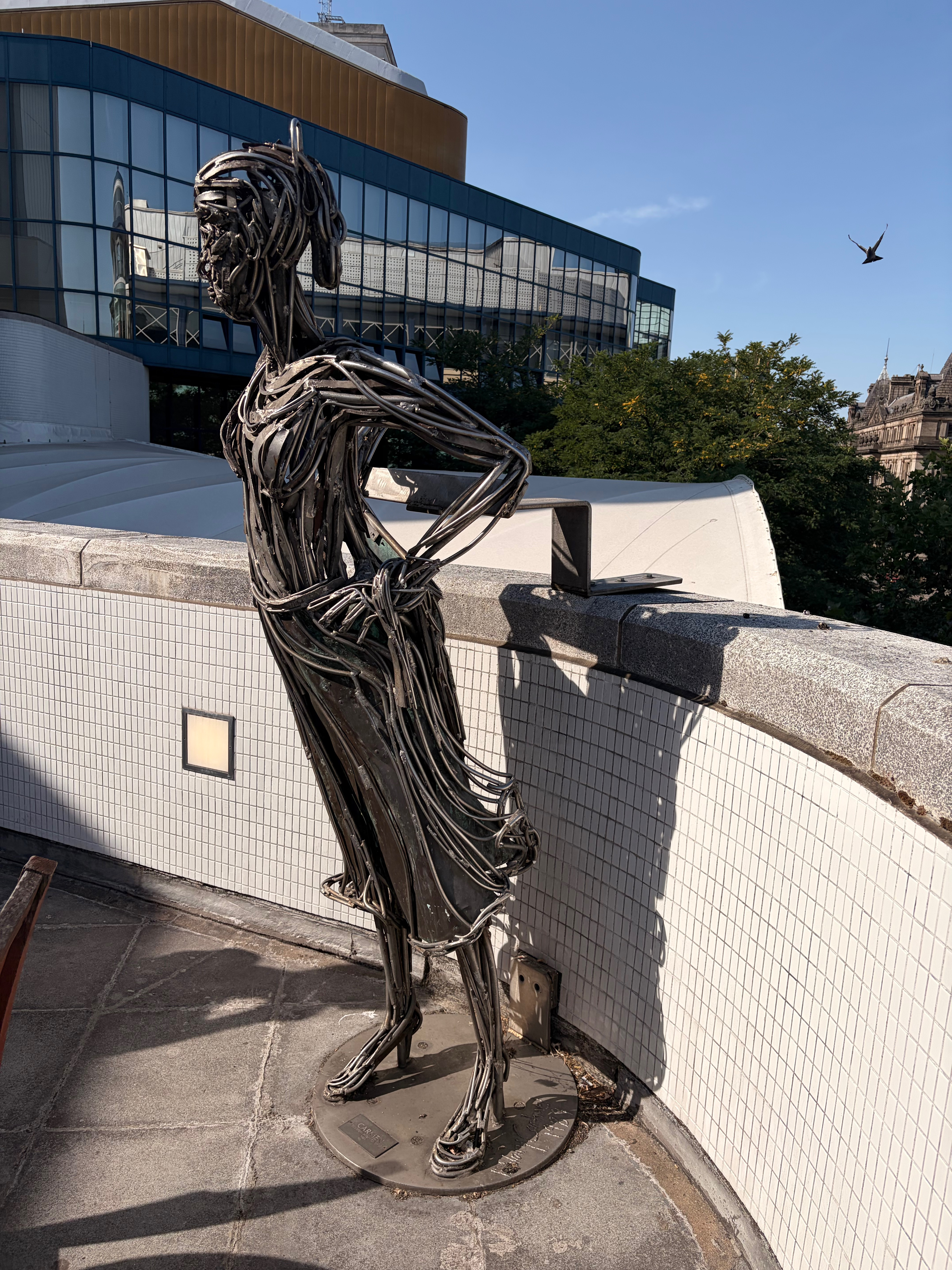
Carmen at the Theatre Royal Nottingham

This is a list of public art in Nottingham, in Nottingham, England. This list applies only to works of public art accessible in an outdoor public space. For example, this does not include artwork visible inside a museum.

== Central Nottingham ==
Image	Title / individual commemorated	Location	Date	Artist	Material	Coordinates
	Funded by 'Homes England' and produced by 'City Arts', and 'Art Fest' in the Broad marsh development area. Nature, history and the future of Nottingham	Side of Severn's house - Middle Pavement.	Nov., 2026	Natalie Coe	Mural - Paint	52.9507712424308, -1.1467346136971028
	Traffic Flow	Wall of carpark, Maid Marion way	1986	Hilary Cartmel	Stainless Steel	52.94950043714792, -1.1505842105300905
'Traffic Flow' was at risk of being lost, due to the forthcoming demolition of the car park in which it is on display on 'Maid Marian Way', according to the Planning Dept., Nottingham City Council. The 'Nottingham Women's History Group' (NWHG) investigated this potential removal and has succeeded in alerting NCC to save this artwork.
	The Chorus Line	was previously at the Junction of Maid Marian Way and Park Row	1999	Hilary Cartmel	Steel, signs point to the 'Playhouse' & the 'Theatre Royal'.	52.953594°N 1.154757°W
'The Chorus Line' was disposed of by Nottingham city council during the remodelling of 'Maid Marian Way' as confirmed by planning dept. The 'Nottingham Women's History Group' (NWHG) investigated this removal and discovered the sculpture was removed without public consultation by Nottingham City Council.
	Carmen	Balcony of the Theatre Royal Nottingham. Previously outside at the entrance.	Pre 1996	Hilary Cartmel		52.95530999851592, -1.1513008342375564
mosaics by Anna Dixon	Heritage of Woodthorpe Grange Park - Mosaics x 5	Inside Woodthorpe Grange Park	2013	Anna Dixon	Mosaic - paint	52.985142462197736, -1.1323120166215837
	image of Eric Irons OBE - Britain's first black magistrate	On a wall, down the steps to the canal opposite Nottingham Railway station. Near Justice Centre	Oct 4, 2021	Honey Williams	Paint on brick	52.947762, -1.148780
	Here & Now	Nottingham Trent Building, 50 Shakespeare St., facing Dryden Pocket Garden	May 4, 2023	Poetry - Claire Miller. Illustrations - Lucinda Ireland.	Paint, calligraphy, brick.	52.95797436587205, -1.1519151166234882
statue of lace industry women	Standing in this Place	The Green Heart, Nottingham (Next to public library)	2025	Rachel Carter & the Legacy Makers	Bronze	52.9496230, -1.1487128
Maid Marian	Maid Marian	Maid Marian Way - T Junction	2026	Alicja Biala	Bronze - plants & flowers	52.95577577094813, -1.1546347317750123
	Sky Mirror	Nottingham Playhouse	2001	Anish Kapoor	Stainless steel	52.954°N 1.1565°W
	Statue of Captain Albert Ball VC	Nottingham Castle	1921	Henry Poole	Bronze	52.94969°N 1.154144°W
	Brian Clough	King Street/Queen Street junction	2008	Les Johnson	Bronze	52.954064°N 1.149742°W
	Robin Hood	Outside Nottingham Castle	1952	James Woodford	Bronze	52.949424°N 1.154596°W
	Axel	Bolero Square, National Ice Centre	2003	Wolfgang Buttress and Fiona Heron	Steel	52.95229°N 1.140549°W
	Sculpture Tree	Lace Market Square	2011	Wolfgang Buttress and Fiona Heron	Bronze	52.952849°N 1.144571°W
	Quartet	Chapel Bar	1986	Richard Perry	Bronze	52.954356°N 1.154172°W
	War Memorial	Nottingham High School	1920	Henry Poole	Bronze	52.96231°N 1.15896°W
	Feargus O'Connor	Nottingham Arboretum	1859	JB Robinson of Derby	Stone	52.961211°N 1.156152°W
	Flying Horse Signpost	St Peter's Gate	1993	Michael Johnson	Steel	52.952261°N 1.149033°W
	Houndsgate Signpost	Houndsgate	1993	Michael Johnson	Steel	52.952083°N 1.149334°W
	Samuel Morley	Nottingham Arboretum	1928	Joseph Else	Bronze and stone	53.049483°N 1.155623°W
	Entrance sculpture	Biocity		Richard Thornton	Steel	
	The invention of ibuprofen	Biocity	2011	Bruce Asbestos		

=== Nottingham Council House ===
Image	Title / individual commemorated	Location	Date	Artist	Material	Coordinates
	Nottingham Lions (right)	Nottingham Council House	1929	Joseph Else	Stone	52.953503°N 1.149262°W
	Nottingham Lions (left)	Nottingham Council House	1929	Joseph Else	Stone	52.953503°N 1.149262°W
	Frieze on Nottingham Council House	Nottingham Council House	1929	Joseph Else	Stone	52.953503°N 1.149262°W
	Prosperity	Dome of Nottingham Council House	1929	James Woodford	Stone	52.953503°N 1.149262°W
	Commerce	Dome of Nottingham Council House	1929	Joseph Else	Stone	52.953503°N 1.149262°W
	Civic Law	Dome of Nottingham Council House	1929	Charles L J Doman	Stone	52.953503°N 1.149262°W
	Knowledge	Dome of Nottingham Council House	1929	Ernest Webb	Stone	52.953503°N 1.149262°W

== Beeston ==
Image	Title / individual commemorated	Location	Date	Artist	Material	Coordinates
	George the Beekeeper	High Road, Beeston	1987	Sioban Coppinger	Concrete and bronze	52.927602°N 1.214272°W
	Water Head	The Square, Beeston	1989	Paul Mason	Marble	52.925547°N 1.214595°W
	Hope (Boer War Memorial)	Broadgate Park	1904	Arthur George Marshall	Stone	52.928465°N 1.210165°W
	Jesse Boot memorial	University of Nottingham	1934	Charles L J Doman	Stone	52.935401°N 1.193553°W
		University of Nottingham	2003	Michael Dan Archer	Stone	52.939183°N 1.203375°W
	Beeston Canal Wall Panels		2006	Hilary Cartmel	Stainless steel, bronze, Mosaic	
	The Green Man	Dovecote Lane Recreation Ground		Stan Bullard	Wood	52.920748°N 1.215065°W

== Carlton ==
Image	Title / individual commemorated	Location	Date	Artist	Material	Coordinates
	Florence Paton, MP	Garden for the Blind, Carlton Hill, Carlton, Nottingham	2019	Hilary Cartmel'	Stainless Steel	52.96590703359833, -1.1093049608013466

== Clifton ==
Image	Title / individual commemorated	Location	Date	Artist	Material	Coordinates
	unknown	Nobel Road		unknown	Steel	52.899787°N 1.191241°W

== Hoveringham ==
Image	Title / individual commemorated	Location	Date	Artist	Material	Coordinates
	Erasmus Darwin's Mammoth	Thurgurton Lane, Hoveringham		Kim James	Steel	53.024364°N 0.958738°W

== Lenton ==
Image	Title / individual commemorated	Location	Date	Artist	Material	Coordinates
Apple sculpture by Hilary Cartmel. Photograph Linzi J Kemp	An apple	Orchard Hotel, Nottingham University, Front		Hilary Cartmel		52.955342387519, -1.1509360362106968
	Apple at rear	Orchard Hotel, Nottingham University, Rear		Hilary Cartmel		52.955342387519, -1.1509360362106968
Remembrance sculpture by Rachel Carter. Photo Linzi J Kemp NWHG	Remembrance sculpture - star	Serenity Garden, Nottingham University		Rachel Carter		52.93316040665543, -1.2013982589539485
	Remembrance sculpture - egg	Serenity Garden, Nottingham University		Rachel Carter		52.93316040665543, -1.2013982589539485
	Reclining Horse	Queens Medical Centre - between the centres of postgrad and treatment		Dame Elisabeth Frink	Bronze	
	Aspire	University of Nottingham	2008	Ken Shuttleworth	Steel	52.9512°N 1.1844°W
	Healing Energy	Queen's Medical Centre	2008	Hilary Cartmel	Steel	52.942698°N 1.182703°W
	The Circle of Life	Queen's Medical Centre	2011	Ann Vrielinck	Bronze	
	unknown	Queen's Medical Centre	????	Unknown	Concrete	52.944523°N 1.186538°W
	Lenton Priory Pillars	Lenton Priory	2018	Adrian Riley	Steel	52.94395046628495°N 1.1790816302020957°W

== Meadows ==
Image	Title / individual commemorated	Location	Date	Artist	Material	Coordinates
	Queen Victoria	Memorial Gardens, Victoria Embankment	1905	Albert Toft	Stone	52.934678°N 1.141641°W
	City War Memorial, Nottingham	Memorial Gardens, Victoria Embankment	1927	T Wallis Gordon	Stone	52.934678°N 1.141641°W

== Sneinton ==
Image	Title / individual commemorated	Location	Date	Artist	Material	Coordinates
	Sneinton Dragon	Junction of Manvers Street and Sneinton Hermitage	2006	Robert Stubley	Steel	52.9490°N 1.1330°W
	Calvary	St. Stephen's Church, Sneinton	1920	Cecil G Hare	Cast iron	52.9514°N 1.1318°W
	Bendigo	On the roof of the former Bendigo Pub, on Sneinton Hermitage	Unknown	From a model by Jack Mann	Concrete	52.9498°N 1.1282°W
	William Booth	Outside his birthplace on Notintone Place in Sneinton	unknown	unknown	Bronze	52.9522°N 1.1319°W

== West Bridgford ==
Image	Title / individual commemorated	Location	Date	Artist	Material	Coordinates
	Heron	Lady Bay		Wolfgang Buttress	Steel	52.938503°N 1.111657°W

== Wilford ==
Image	Title / individual commemorated	Location	Date	Artist	Material	Coordinates
	Robert Juckes Clifton	Wilford Toll Bridge	1883	William Philip Smith	Stone	52.938003°N 1.154074°W
