= The Dales United Reformed Church =

- The Dales United Reformed Church, formerly Parkdale Congregational Church, in September 2026
- The Dales United Reformed Church
- 52.961394°N 1.107318°W
- Location: Nottingham
- Country: England
- Denomination: United Reformed
- Previous denomination: Congregational
- Website: www.thedalesurc.co.uk

History
- Former name: Parkdale Congregational Church

Architecture
- Completed: 1930

The Dales United Reformed Church was built as Parkdale Congregational Church on Parkdale Road in Bakersfield Nottingham in 1930.

== History ==
The church opened in 1930 as Parkdale Congregational Church. It was one of three planned in the 1920s and 1930s by the Nottinghamshire Congregational Churches Extension Committee, to serve new housing estates around Nottingham. The other two were Sherwood and Lenton Abbey.

It was built to serve Bakersfield, Nottingham. In common with most Congregational churches in the 1970s, it joined the United Reformed Church. In 1986 the church joined with Albion Congregational Church, Sneinton Dale, and renamed itself The Dales United Reformed Church.
