= Bakersfield, Nottingham =

Coordinates: 52.960°N 1.112°W

Bakersfield
- suburb
- Location within Nottinghamshire
- OS grid reference: SK5964240696
- Unitary authority: Nottingham
- Ceremonial county: Nottinghamshire
- Region: East Midlands
- Country: England
- Sovereign state: United Kingdom
- Post town: NOTTINGHAM
- Postcode district: NG2, NG3
- Dialling code: 0115
- Police: Nottinghamshire
- Fire: Nottinghamshire
- Ambulance: East Midlands
- UK Parliament: Nottingham East

Bakersfield is a small residential suburb of Nottingham east of the city centre.

== History ==
Bakersfield was developed during the 1930s, with a mixture of private and council residential housing. A remarkable feature of the council housing (designed by T. Cecil Howitt) is the space given over to gardens and other open spaces. Other amenities added later included a supermarket (Greater Nottingham Coop on Oakdale Road), numerous smaller shops and a sub post-office. In common with most Nottingham developments of the time, housing was provided first, with other facilities being added later.

== Government ==
Bakersfield lies on the eastern edge of Nottingham unitary authority, running up to the boundary with Gedling Borough Council. It is in the Nottingham East constituency for Westminster elections.

== Geography ==
Bakersfield occupies the eastern end of Dales ward, around Oakdale Road. It lies between the suburbs of Sneinton to the west, Carlton to the northeast, and Colwick to the southeast. To the south is Colwick Woods, a large area of ancient woodland and green open space, leading down to the Nottingham Racecourse at Colwick. There are panoramic views from the top of Colwick Woods, of the Trent Valley as far as Belvoir Castle and across the city to Wollaton, Clifton and the Ratcliffe on Soar power station. A feature of the area is that many of the road names end in 'dale' (for example Parkdale, Middledale, Langdale, Greendale and Kirkdale), which sometimes causes confusion for first-time visitors.

== Demography ==
Bakersfield was once inhabited by post war Polish/Italian immigrants. Many of the Italian immigrants were prisoners of war who were held in the prisoner of war camp situated on Colwick Woods. While Poles and Italians still have a presence, it now has an increasing South Asian demographic.

== Economy ==
Bakersfield missed out on the great industrialisation of the 19th century and was created as a dormitory for commuters into Nottingham city centre.

== Culture and community ==
The Rio cinema on Oakdale Road opened in 1939 and closed due to the onslaught of television in 1959. It then became a night club; later it was converted into a shop ('Supasave'). The ground floor is used as a shop, called "Nisa Local" (formerly "Oakdale Stores") with the former balcony level as a snooker club that was closed in November 2008, having since re-opened as a restaurant which has since closed.

There are a couple of public houses, a medical centre and a community centre.

== Landmarks ==
The former public house, The Oakdale, stood on the original site of a large farm barn. Over the years, it has been the centre of the local community and in the Second World War was a bomb shelter. The public house has now closed and the premised now house a Tesco Express store. Oakdale Road and the pub both get their name from a large oak tree that stood there until bad weather caused damage, and it was deemed unsafe and had to be felled.

== Transport ==
The railway to Netherfield and Grantham runs along the A612 road on the southern edge of Bakersfield but the area has not had a station since the Racecourse station shut in 1959.

=== Buses ===
Nottingham City Transport

- 43: Nottingham – Sneinton Dale – Bakersfield

Nottingham Minibus

- 773: Netherfield – Carlton – Bakersfield

== Education ==
Some primary students attended Jesse Boot Primary School, Hereford Road, Parkdale Primary School, Parkdale Road.

Comprehensive age students accessed schools around the immediate area, such as Greenwood Dale, Manvers Pierrepont, Carlton Road and further down Sneinton Road. Further Education was initially at the Forest Fields College, and as of the late 1990s in the now defunct Manvers Pierrepont Comprehensive, Carlton Road.

== Religion ==
The parish church of St John the Baptist at Carlton (further up Oakdale Road, opened in 1957) and St Stephen's on Sneinton Dale cover the area for the Church of England. The Church of St Cyprian on Marston Road, off Dale View Road, was built in 1913. Dales United Reformed Church was built in 1930.

== Sport ==
Nottingham Racecourse and Nottingham Greyhound Stadium lie on the southern edge of Bakersfield. There was a public pitch and putt course in Colwick Woods which was closed some years ago.

== Notable people ==
Jack Burkitt captained Nottingham Forest to their 1959 FA Cup win against Luton Town. He managed Notts County in 1966 and then worked for Brian Clough at Derby for a few years before leaving football to take over Oakdale Road post office.

== See also ==
- Bakersfield (disambiguation) – for other towns with the same name
