= Bakersfield station =

Bakersfield station may refer to:

- Bakersfield station (Amtrak)
- Bakersfield station (California High-Speed Rail)
- Bakersfield station (Southern Pacific Railroad)

== See also ==
- Bakersfield (disambiguation)
