= List of tallest buildings and structures in Nottingham =

This list of tallest buildings and structures in Nottingham ranks the tallest buildings as well as structures within the City of Nottingham by height. Currently the tallest structure in Nottingham is the Eastcroft Incinerator, standing at 91 m (299 ft). However, the tallest building in Nottingham is Victoria Centre Flats A, standing at 75 m (246 ft).

St. Peter's Church in Nottingham was built in 1480, and was the tallest building in Nottingham for 361 years. High rise development in Nottingham was most active during the 1960s when many residential flats and tower blocks were constructed. However, several of these have been demolished or renovated during the 1980s and 2010s. High rise development slowed during the 1970s, and since 2000 only a few high rise buildings have been constructed.

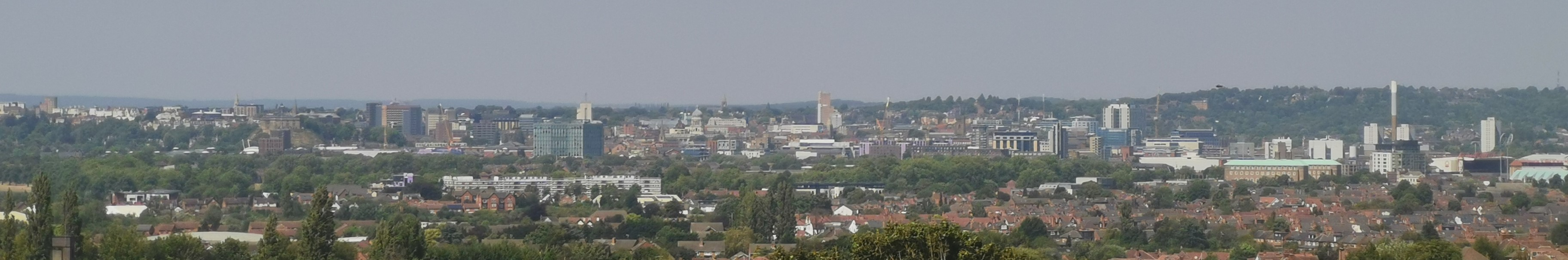
Panoramic view of Nottingham seen from Sharphill Wood, West Bridgford in July 2022

== Tallest existing buildings and structures ==
The tallest existing buildings and structures above 40 metres (131 ft) as of November 2024, in Nottingham and outer suburbs are listed below.

Rank	Name (alternate names)	Image	Height		Floors	Year	Use	Coordinates	Notes
1	Eastcroft Energy from Waste Facility (Eastcroft Incinerator)		91 m	299 ft		1970	Chimney	52°56′47″N 1°08′07″W	Tallest standing structure in the city since 1970.
2	Victoria Centre Flats A		75 m	246 ft	26	1972	Residential	52°57′26″N 1°08′50″W	Tallest building in Nottingham since 1972.; Tallest building completed in Nottingham in the 1970s.
3	Mapperley radio mast		71 m	233 ft			Transmitter	52°58′24″N 1°07′45″W	
4=	Pine View (Buckland Court)		62 m	203 ft	21	1967	Residential	52°57′36″N 1°10′19″W	Tallest building completed in Nottingham in the 1960s.; Tallest building in Nottingham from 1967 until 1972.; Tallest structure in Nottingham from 1967 until 1970.
4=	Lenton radio mast		62 m	203 ft			Transmitter	52°56′30″N 1°10′35″W	
6=	Bowman Telephone Exchange (BT)		61 m	200 ft	13	1978	Telephone Exchange Office	52°57′22″N 1°08′27″W	
6=	UoN Chimney		61 m	200 ft		1968	Chimney	52°56′24″N 1°11′32″W	
6=	Burrows Court		61 m	200 ft	21	1967	Residential	52°57′24″N 1°07′34″W	Renovations were made to the building in 1994, and again from February 2018 to May 2021.
6=	Nottingham Council House		61 m	200 ft		1929	City Hall; Mercantile	52°57′12″N 1°08′55″W	Tallest building completed in Nottingham in the 1920s.; Tallest building in Nottingham from 1929 until 1967.
10	Aspire		60 m	197 ft		2008	Sculpture	52°57′06″N 1°11′05″W	Tallest structure completed in Nottingham in the 2000s.
11	Southchurch Court		59 m	194 ft	20	1969	Residential	52°54′42″N 1°10′16″W	
12	Tower Building, UoN		57.9 m	190 ft	17	1966	University	52°56′32″N 1°11′19″W	
13	All Hallows Church, Gedling		54.8 m	180 ft		1230	Church	52°58′37″N 1°04′50″W	Second highest spire in the county after St Mary Magdalene, Newark.; Outside the city boundary, but in outlying suburbs.
14	Ash View (Bampton Court)		54.5 m	179 ft	18	1968	Residential	52°57′38″N 1°10′23″W	
15=	Victoria Centre Flats B		53.3 m	175 ft	19	1972	Residential	52°57′23″N 1°08′49″W	
15=	All Saints' Church		53.3 m	175 ft		1864	Church	52°57′37″N 1°09′41″W	
17	High Point (Braidwood Court / The Pinnacle)		52.7 m	173 ft	19	1970	Residential	52°57′59″N 1°10′06″W	
18=	Unity Square Phase 1		50 m	160 ft	11	2022	Governmental Office	52°56′47″N 1°08′53″W	
18=	Cranbrook House		50 m	164 ft	14	1963	Residential	52°57′15″N 1°08′29″W	
20	Marco Island (Royal Mail Building)		47.9 m	157 ft	15	2005	Residential; Mercantile; Parking	52°57′20″N 1°08′31″W	Tallest building completed in Nottingham in the 2000s.; Built on the frame of a smaller post sorting office dating from 1939.
21=	Oak View (Mellors Court)		46 m	151 ft	16	1968	Residential	52°57′36″N 1°10′22″W	
21=	Mapperley Ridge DAB mast		46 m	151 ft			Transmitter	52°58′35″N 1°07′57″W	
23=	IQ Newtown House		45.7 m	150 ft	14	1962	Residential Mercantile	52°57′06″N 1°09′12″W	Refurbished in 2016.
23=	Newton Building, NTU		45.7 m	150 ft	10	1956	University	52°57′24″N 1°09′07″W	Tallest building completed in Nottingham in the 1950s.
23=	St Paul's Church, Daybrook		45.7 m	150 ft		1897	Church	53°00′02″N 1°08′17″W	Outside the city boundary but in outlying suburbs.
23=	St Andrews Church		45.7 m	150 ft		1871	Church	52°57′55″N 1°09′08″W	
23=	Nottingham Cathedral (The Cathedral Church of St. Barnabas)		45.7 m	150 ft		1844	Church	52°57′17″N 1°09′26″W	
23=	St. Peter's Church		45.7 m	150 ft		1480	Church	52°57′08″N 1°08′55″W	Tallest building and structure in Nottingham from 1480 until 1821.
29	Nottingham One Tower		45.6 m	150 ft	14	2014	Residential; Office	52°56′57″N 1°08′32″W	Tallest building completed in Nottingham in the 2010s.
30=	Kingston Court		45.1 m	148 ft	16	1966	Residential	52°57′07″N 1°08′02″W	
30=	Colwick Woods Court		45.1 m	148 ft	16	1966	Residential	52°57′03″N 1°07′07″W	
30=	Woodthorpe Court		45.1 m	148 ft	16	1965	Residential	52°59′01″N 1°08′13″W	
30=	Winchester Court		45.1 m	148 ft	16	1965	Residential	52°58′58″N 1°08′12″W	
30=	Bentinck Court		45.1 m	148 ft	16	1965	Residential	52°57′09″N 1°08′09″W	
30=	Manvers Court		45.1 m	148 ft	16	1964	Residential	52°57′07″N 1°08′07″W	
36	Colwick Wood radio mast		45 m	148 ft		1995	Transmitter	52°57′11″N 1°06′43″W	
37=	Market Square House		44.5 m	146 ft	12	1973	Office; Mercantile	52°57′12″N 1°09′06″W	Built for Lloyds Bank, to replace an earlier branch.
37=	Pitcher & Piano (The Unitarian Church)		44.5 m	146 ft	2	1876	Public house	52°57′03″N 1°08′43″W	Formerly the High Pavement Unitarian Chapel.
39	The Litmus Building		44 m	144 ft	14	2007	Residential	52°57′24″N 1°08′37″W	
40=	Global Point (Academy Heights / Kaplan Residences)		43 m	141 ft	14	2014	Residential; Shops; Restaurant	52°57′11″N 1°09′12″W	
40=	E.ON Trinity House		43 m	141 ft	9	2012	Office	52°57′23″N 1°09′00″W	
40=	Leonardo Hotel		43 m	141 ft	13	2005	Hotel	52°56′54″N 1°08′26″W	
43	Britannia Hotel		42.6 m	140 ft	14	1969	Hotel	52°57′08″N 1°09′14″W	
44	Queens Medical Centre Chimney		42 m	138 ft		1971	Chimney	52°56′45″N 1°11′05″W	
45	The Vantage		40 m	130 ft	14	2021	Rental Apartments; Public Parking; Fitness Centre	52°56′44″N 1°09′08″W	

== Tallest under construction, approved and proposed ==
Below are sub-sections for the tallest under construction, approved and proposed buildings and structures in Nottingham.

=== Under construction ===
This lists buildings that are under construction in Nottingham over 40 m (130 ft).

Rank	Name (alternate names)	Image	Height		Floors	Year	Use	Coordinates	Notes
1	Island Quarter Hotel		73.15 m	240.0 ft	20	2023	Hotel; Rental Apartments		Foundation work in place.
2	Hotel Indigo / Staybridge Suite		70 m	230 ft	18	2023	Hotel		Foundation work in place.

=== Approved ===
This lists buildings that have been approved for, but are yet to start, construction in Nottingham over 40 m (130 ft).

Rank	Name (alternate names)	Height		Floors	Year	Use	Coordinates	Notes
1	Three Wilford Road	105 m	344 ft	23	2024	Residential; Rental Apartments	52°56′45″N 1°09′08″W	Site is currently being prepared for construction.; If complete by 2024, Three Wilford Road will become the tallest building and first skyscraper built in Nottingham.
2	Unity Square Phase 2	60 m	200 ft	15	2023	Commercial Office; Governmental Office	52°56′47″N 1°08′57″W	Site is currently being prepared for construction.
3	London Road Centre	48 m	157 ft	13	2023	Office; Restaurant	52°56′36″N 1°08′21″W	
4=	Arkwright Street	45 m	148 ft	13	2023	Residential; Office	52°56′42″N 1°08′50″W	Site is currently being prepared for construction.
4=	Island Quarter Apartments	45 m	148 ft	18		Rental Apartments; Shops		Site is currently being prepared for construction.

== Tallest unbuilt and demolished ==
Below are sub-sections for the tallest unbuilt and demolished buildings and structures in Nottingham.

=== Tallest unbuilt buildings and structures ===
This lists proposals for the construction of buildings in Nottingham that were planned to rise at least 40 metres (131 ft), for which planning permission was rejected or which were otherwise withdrawn.

Rank	Name (alternate names)	Image	Height		Floors	Use	Notes
1	Whyte Tower 1 (Lower Parliament Street Tower 1)		151 m	495 ft	54	Residential; Hotel; Office	
2	Christian Centre		93 m	305 ft		Church	
3	No. 1 Brook Street Tower 1		80 m	260 ft	25	Residential; Mercantile	
4	Whyte Tower 2		78 m	256 ft	25	Commercial Office; Hotel	
5	No. 1 Brook Street Tower 2		46.8 m	154 ft	12	Residential; Mercantile	

=== Tallest demolished buildings and structures ===
This list shows the tallest buildings in structures in Nottingham of at least 40 metres (131 ft) in height that have been demolished.

Rank	Name (alternate names)	Image	Height		Floors	Completed	Demolished	Use	Coordinates	Notes
1=	Evans Court		61 m	200 ft	20	1971	1985	Residential	52°59′01″N 1°10′57″W	
1=	Auburn Court		61 m	200 ft	20	1971	1985	Residential	52°58′58″N 1°10′55″W	
1=	Wicklow Court		61 m	200 ft	20	1971	1985	Residential	52°59′01″N 1°11′03″W	
1=	Hill Court		61 m	200 ft	20	1971	1985	Residential	52°59′02″N 1°11′07″W	
5	Holy Trinity Church		54 m	177 ft		1841	1958	Church	52°57′22″N 1°08′56″W	Tallest building and structure in Nottingham from 1841 until 1929.
6	City Hospital Chimney		50 m	164 ft		1969	2024	Chimney	52°59′29″N 1°09′08″W	
7=	Willoughby Court		48.1 m	158 ft	17	1967	2015	Residential	52°56′58″N 1°10′22″W	
7=	Newgate Court		48.1 m	158 ft	17	1967	2016	Residential	52°57′04″N 1°10′22″W	
7=	Lenton Court		48.1 m	158 ft	17	1967	2013	Residential	52°57′01″N 1°10′23″W	
7=	Digby Court		48.1 m	158 ft	17	1967	2014	Residential	52°56′59″N 1°10′19″W	
7=	Abbey Court		48.1 m	158 ft	17	1967	2014	Residential	52°57′02″N 1°10′20″W	
12	Highcross Court		43.3 m	142 ft	15	1966	2012	Residential	52°57′34″N 1°10′10″W	

== Timeline of tallest buildings and structures ==
Year tallest	Name	Image	Height		Floors	Coordinates	Notes
1480–1841	St. Peter's Church		45.7 m	150 ft		52°57′08″N 1°08′55″W	
1841–1929	Holy Trinity Church		54 m	177 ft		52°57′22″N 1°08′56″W	
1929–1967	Nottingham Council House		61 m	200 ft		52°57′12″N 1°08′55″W	
1967–1970	Pine View (Buckland Court)		62 m	203 ft	21	52°57′36″N 1°10′19″W	
1970–present	Eastcroft Energy from Waste Facility (Eastcroft Incinerator)		91 m	299 ft		52°56′47″N 1°08′07″W	

== Tallest structures in Nottinghamshire ==
=== Current ===
Rank	Name (alternate names)	Image	Height		Floors	Year	Use	Coordinates	Notes
1	West Burton Power Station (Decommissioned)		200 m	660 ft		1966	Chimney	53.365°N 0.8194°W	
2	Ratcliffe-on-Soar Power Station (Decommissioned)		199 m	653 ft		1968	Chimney	52.865268°N 1.255°W	

=== Former ===
Name (alternate names)	Image	Height		Floors	Year	Demolished	Use	Coordinates	Notes
Cottam Power Station		199 m	653 ft		1968	2025	Chimney	53.304°N 0.7815°W	
High Marnham Power Station		121 m	397 ft		1959	2004	Chimney	53.229°N 0.792°W	
