= Sneinton Festival =

Cultural event in Nottingham, England

Coordinates: 52.9488°N 1.1237°W

A live band plays in the Hermitage Square in 2007

Sneinton Festival is a local cultural event that takes place every July in Sneinton, Nottingham, England. The first festival was held in 1995, and is run by The Festival Group, a volunteer group made up of local residents, representatives of local organisations, community groups, schools, church, youth and play groups, artists, musicians, performers and local project workers. Since 2002, the group has been supported and coordinated by the Sneinton Community Project. Each festival is organised around three individual elements: initial workshops, a week-long festival, and lastly a carnival day.

The festival is based at the Greenway Centre on Trent Lane.

== Format ==
Workshops organised by The Festival Group take place in the run-up to the festival, and bring young people together to be creative, most often in local schools and youth groups. The workshops are based around the year's theme, building the artwork, decorations and costumes for the Carnival Parade as well as holding dance and performance workshops. Where possible, the artwork is made using scrap materials - either from the scrapstores, members donations, or found items. School competitions are held to produce the year's festival logos, publicity, as well as to create more material to be used throughout Festival Week.

The Festival Week begins on a Saturday, and involves seven days of events held in and around the area. They included exhibitions, displays, open days, performance, entertainers, socials, food tastings and multicultural events run and developed by local groups and organisations under the co-ordination of the festival committee. The events are free and open to everyone and endeavour to reflect the diversity of the local community and represent cultures, age and gender.

Festival Week culminates in Carnival Day, held on the next Saturday. The Carnival Parade includes floats, fancy dress, costumes, event performers, samba bands, jazz bands, youth bands, dancers, jugglers and clowns. The Festival then continues in the Hermitage Square when the Carnival Parade arrives, and features an afternoon of free and diverse entertainment, including music performers, dance groups, circus performers, fire eaters, jugglers, magicians, puppet shows, poetry readings, story tellers, as well as karate, gymnastic, aerobics and sport displays. There are many refreshments available, including Asian, Bosnian, West African, French, Italian and Afro-Caribbean food, as well as a traditional British cake stall.

== Theme ==
Every year the Festival is organised around a different theme, which is used when producing artwork, costumes, performances. Within these themes the group also tries to focus on community issues such as recycling, differing cultures, use and access to the media, or science and technology. Previous themes have been:

- 1995 – People and Places (world culture)
- 1996 – Old and New (recycling)
- 1997 – Sneinton-on-Sea (inner-city seaside)
- 1998 – Planet Sneinton (sci-fi and technology)
- 1999 – One upon a time in Sneinton (world folklore)
- 2000 – Sneinton Millennium (one thousand years of people in Sneinton)
- 2001 – Technicolor Sneinton (colour, patterns and psychedelia)
- 2002 – Magic Sneinton (magic, conjuring and mystical stories)
- 2003 – Channel Sneinton (television, video, film and media)
- 2004 – Sneintopoly (board games and play from around the world)
- 2005 – no theme specified
- 2006 – Sustainable Energy Sources (green energy)
- 2007 – Earth, Wind, Fire, Water (green energy)
- 2009 – Sneinton's Got Talent (based on Britain's Got Talent)

The 2019 festival was cancelled due to a lack of volunteers and funding, but hopes to return in 2020.

- 2024 – 40th Year Celebration
- 2025 – Dragons; Local Myths & Legends
