= Bakersfield (disambiguation) =

Bakersfield is the 9th-most populous city in California and the 47th-most populous city in the United States.

Bakersfield may also refer to:

- Bakersfield, Nottingham
- Bakersfield, Texas
- Bakersfield, Vermont

== Other uses ==
- Bakersfield (album), a 2013 country album by Vince Gill and Paul Franklin
- Bakersfield station (disambiguation), stations of the name
- Bakersfield sound, genre of country music originating from Bakersfield, California
