= Green's Mill, Sneinton =

Windmill in Nottingham, England

Coordinates: 52°57′8″N 1°7′45″W

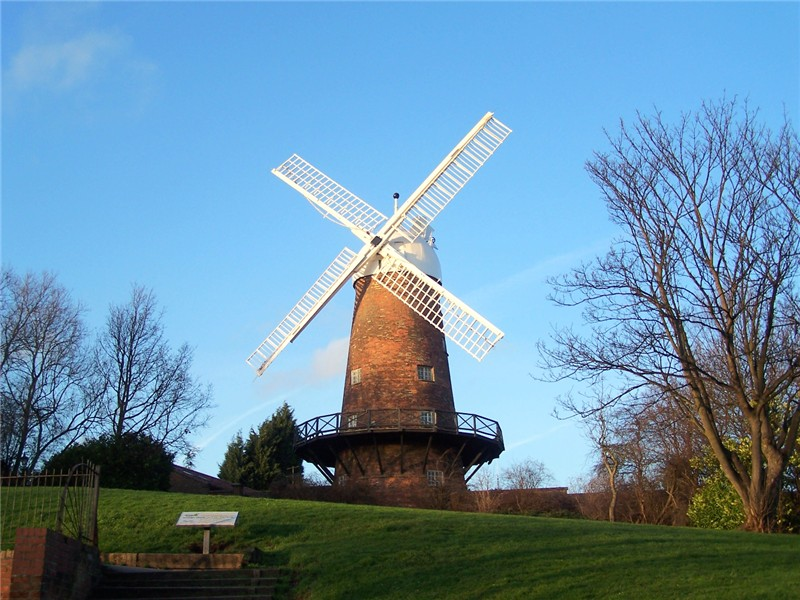
Green's Windmill

Green's Windmill is a restored and working 19th-century tower windmill in Sneinton, Nottingham. Built in the early 1800s for the milling of wheat into flour, it remained in use until the 1860s. It was renovated in the 1980s and is now part of a science centre, which together have become a local tourist attraction.

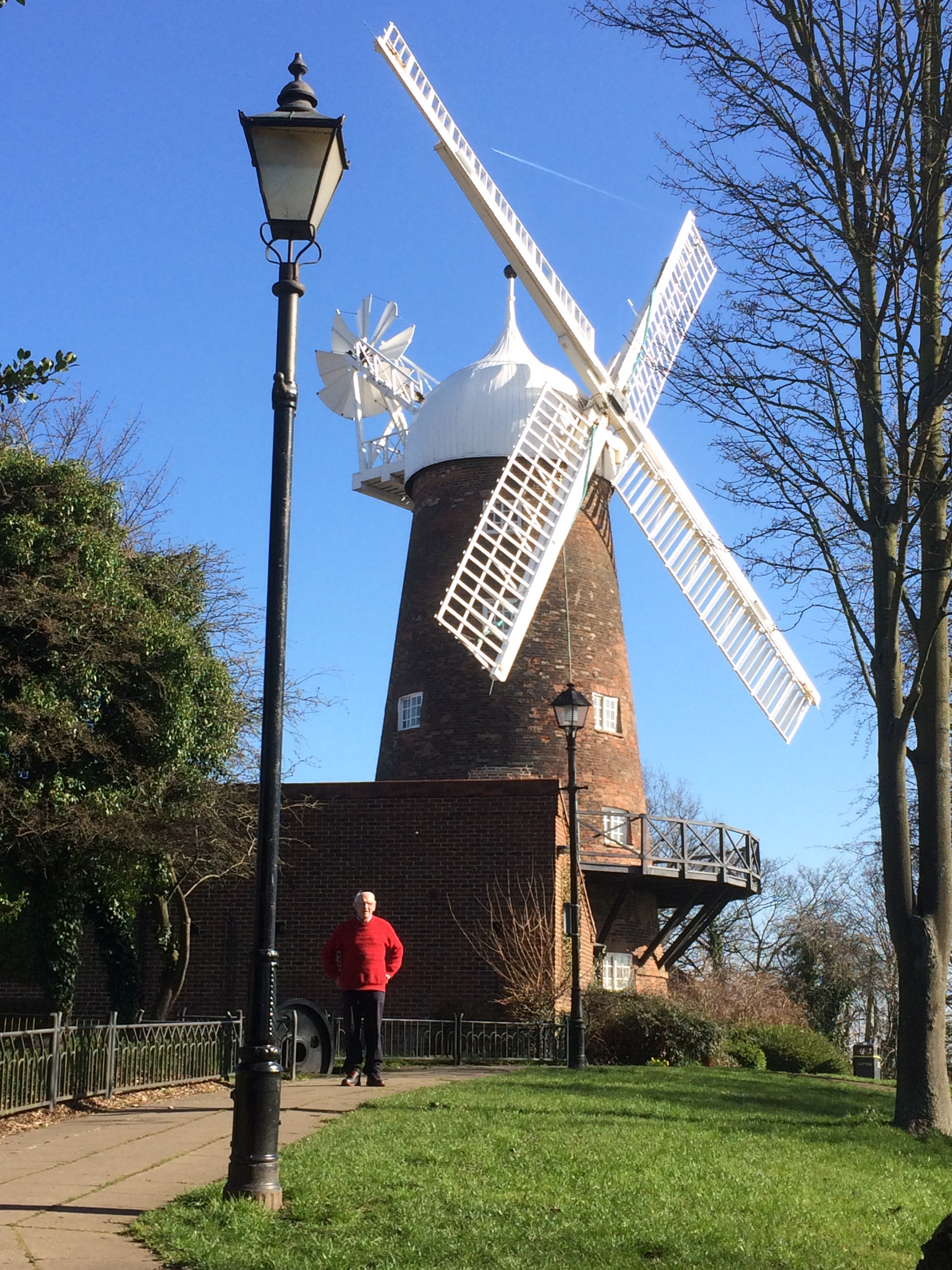

== History ==
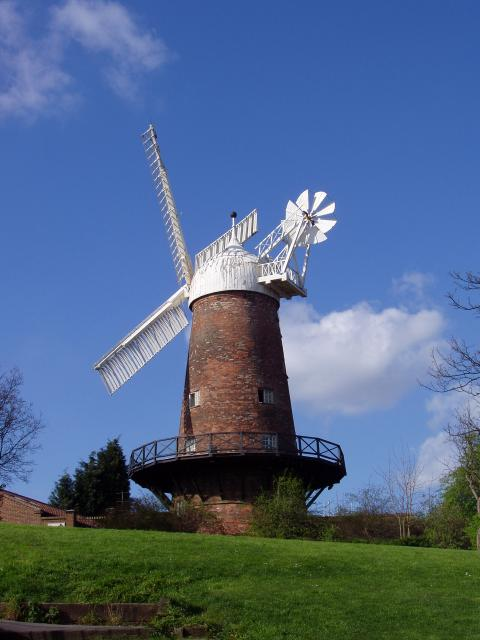
The cap of the windmill rotates to face the wind

The current tower mill was built shortly after 1807 by baker George Green. It is located on the site of a previous post mill and there were at least two other mills on Windmill Lane in Sneinton. In 1829 the elder Green died and his son, the mathematical physicist George Green, inherited the mill. Around this time, a visitor to the mill describes its operation:

"I ascertained some facts relative to the economy of a wind-mill. His sails have a radius of twelve yards and they revolve twenty five times a minute, or more than a mile at the extremities. This great velocity carries round the stones, which are sixteen feet in circumference, 162 times in a minute, and they grind a load of ten sacks of wheat in two or three hours. The sails are placed at an angle in the shaft, and then in union are placed exactly in the wind's point, but the quantity of cloth is varied inversely as the force of the wind. I went through this fine mill, and really felt terrified at the centrifugal force of such heavy masses as the stones, the peripheries of which were carried round with a determined velocity of forty miles an hour. Of course, none but particular kinds of stone will bear such a momentum, and the smallest fracture or inequality occasions them to separate with destructive consequences."

George Green operated the mill until his death in 1841; the Green family let the mill to Mr Fletcher and later to William Oakland. The tower mill remained in use until the 1860s, until it was eventually forced to close in the face of competition from the more modern steam powered roller mills. The sails were removed, the mill was abandoned, and it gradually fell into disrepair. The wooden roof rotted away, ultimately causing the fantail to detach and crash through a nearby cottage.

In 1919 the mill was bought by Oliver Hind, a local solicitor, who in 1923 fitted a copper cap at the top to again make the building watertight. The mill was converted into a factory, manufacturing boot polish. Now filled with flammable industrial volatile solvents, the mill eventually caught fire in 1947, again destroying the roof. Once again, the mill fell into disrepair.

The mill was derelict and facing demolition, until it was acquired by Nottingham City Council in 1979. Funds were raised by the University of Nottingham and it was renovated by Thompson's, millwrights of Alford, Lincolnshire between 1984 and 1986. It is a Grade II listed building. It was reopened in December 1986 and is now part of a science centre which is open to the public. At the same time, No 3, Green's Gardens was restored from near dereliction by the Nottingham Buildings Preservations Trust as a residence for one of the Museum staff.

== Operation ==
Green's Mill is entirely powered by the wind. The movement of the Earth's atmosphere across the massive external sails causes them to rotate, which in turn spins the wooden drive shaft internal to the building. Various mechanisms (winches/millstones/shakers) inside the mill draw power from the drive shaft using gear trains.

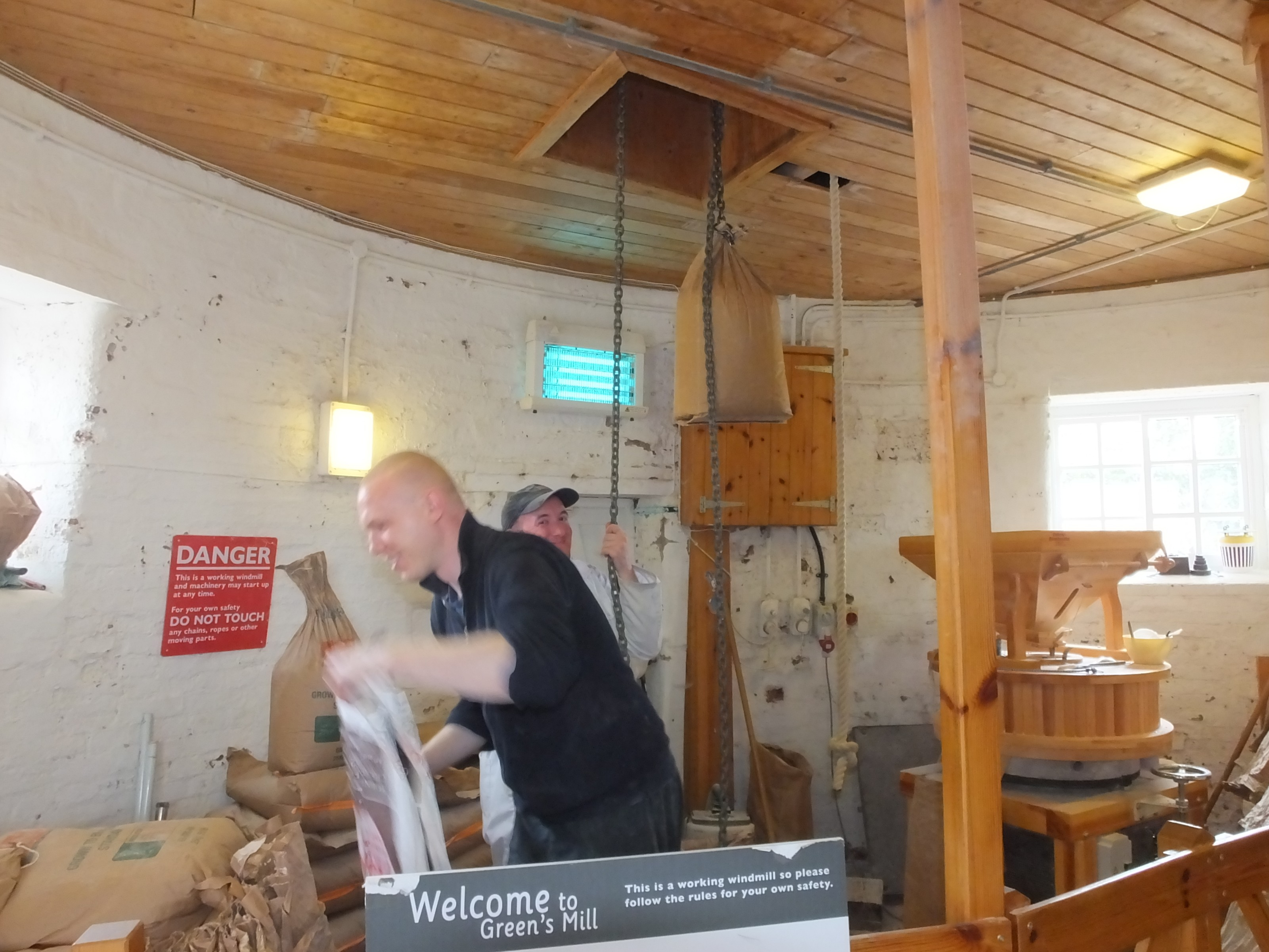
1) Sacks of wheat grain are hoisted to the top of the mill

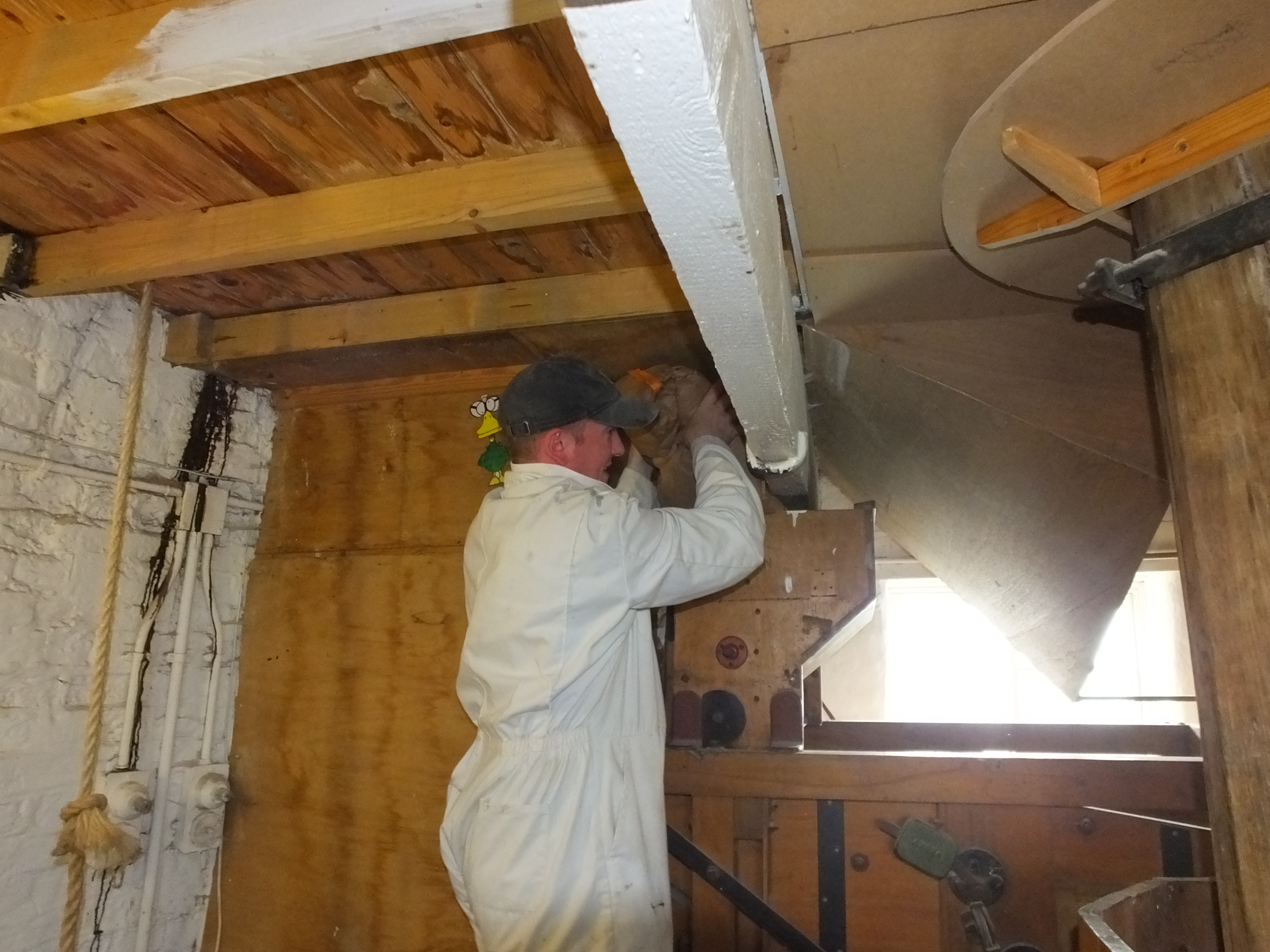
2) Wheat is fed into the grain cleaner

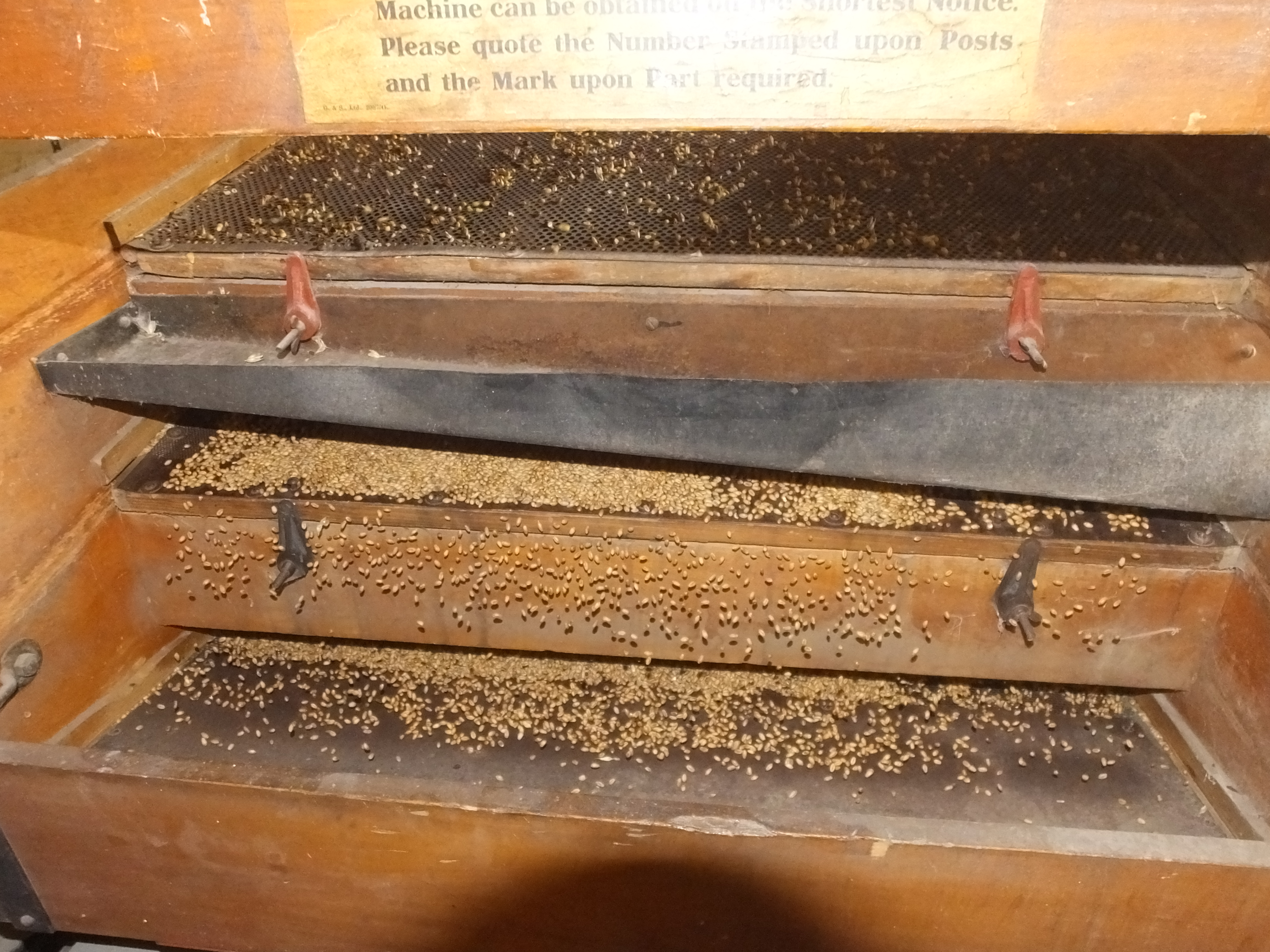
3) The grain cleaner sorts the grain from the chaff

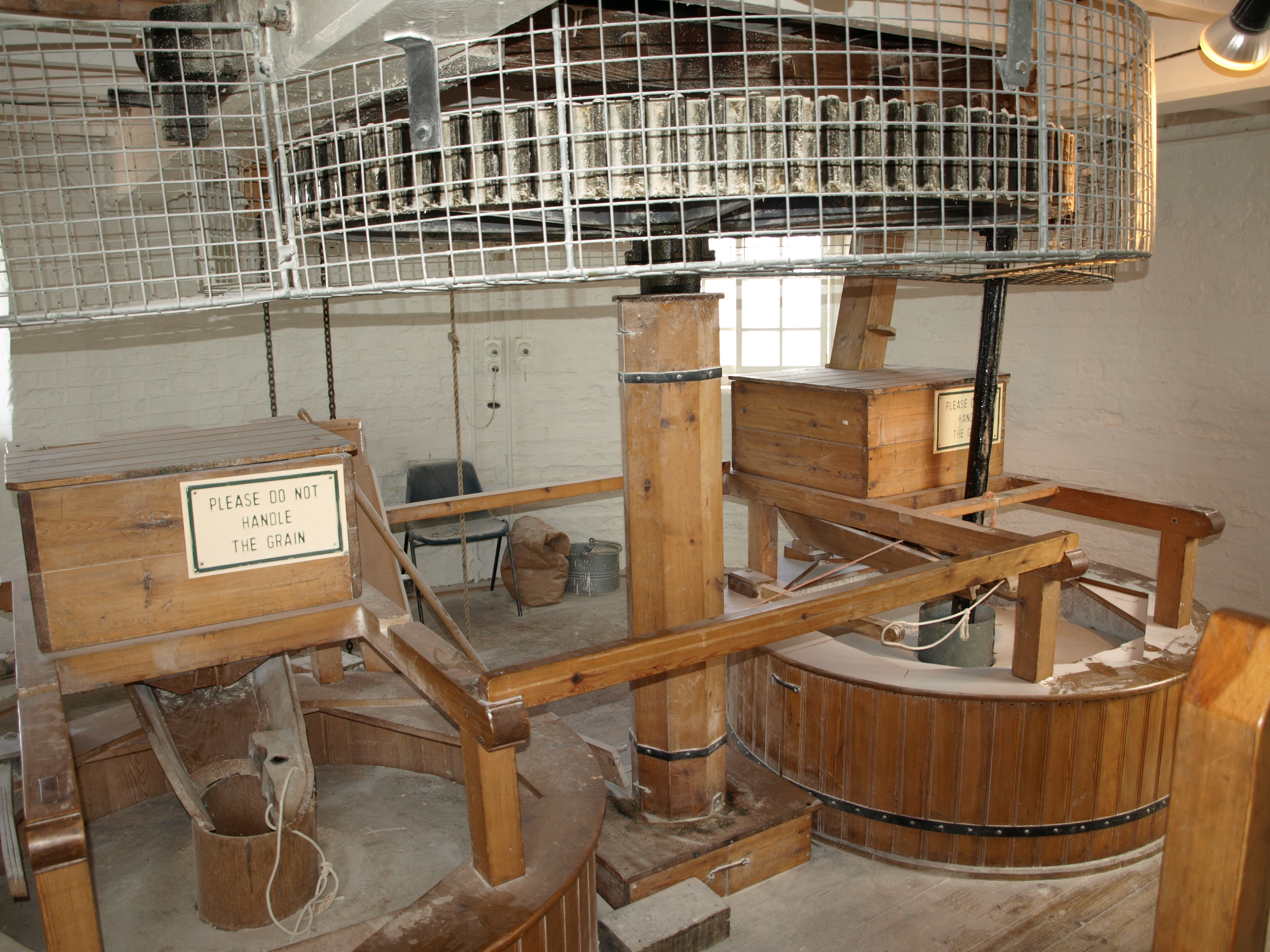
4) Grain is fed into the millstones

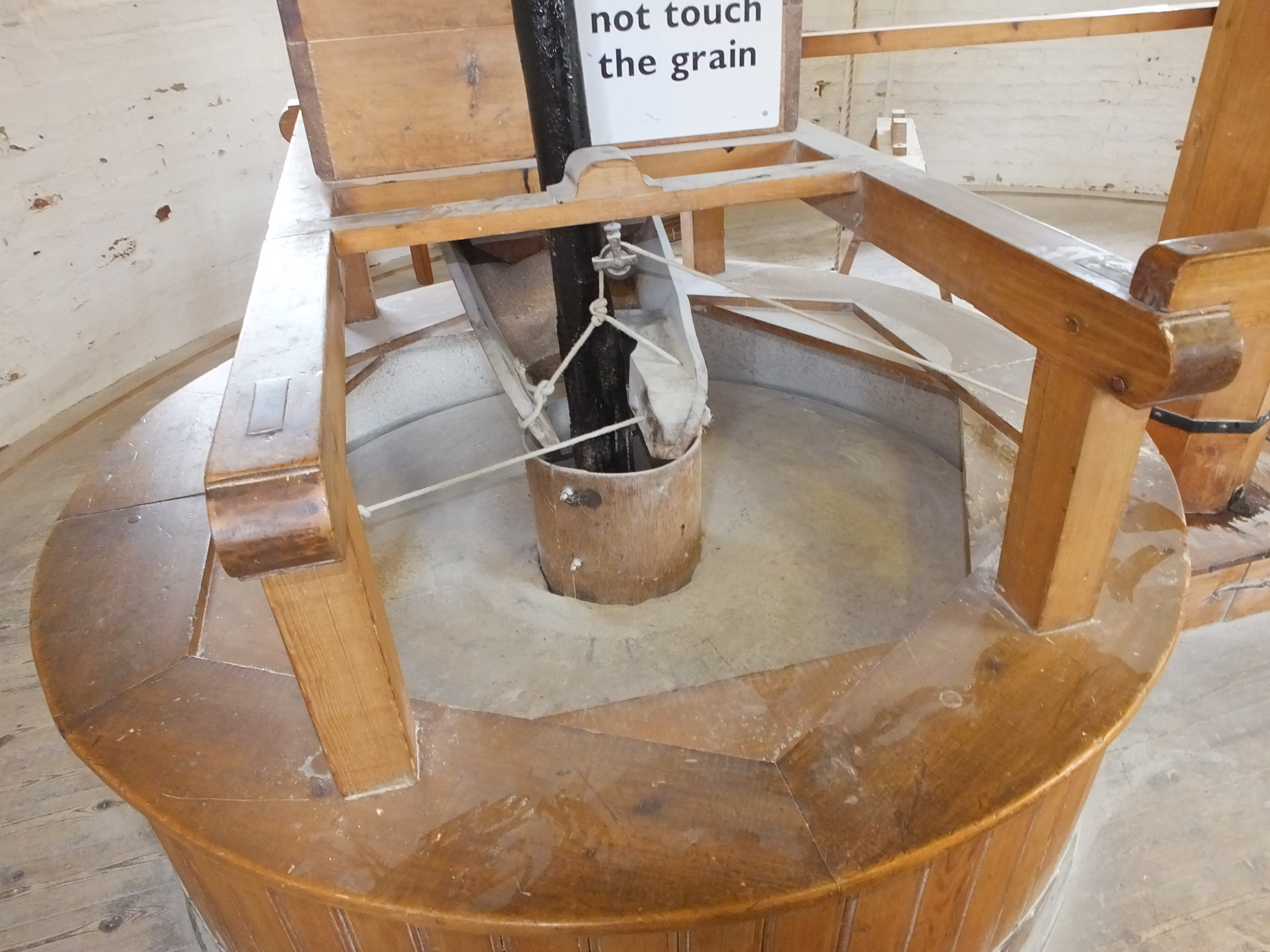
5) Between the millstones, grain is ground to a fine powder (meal)

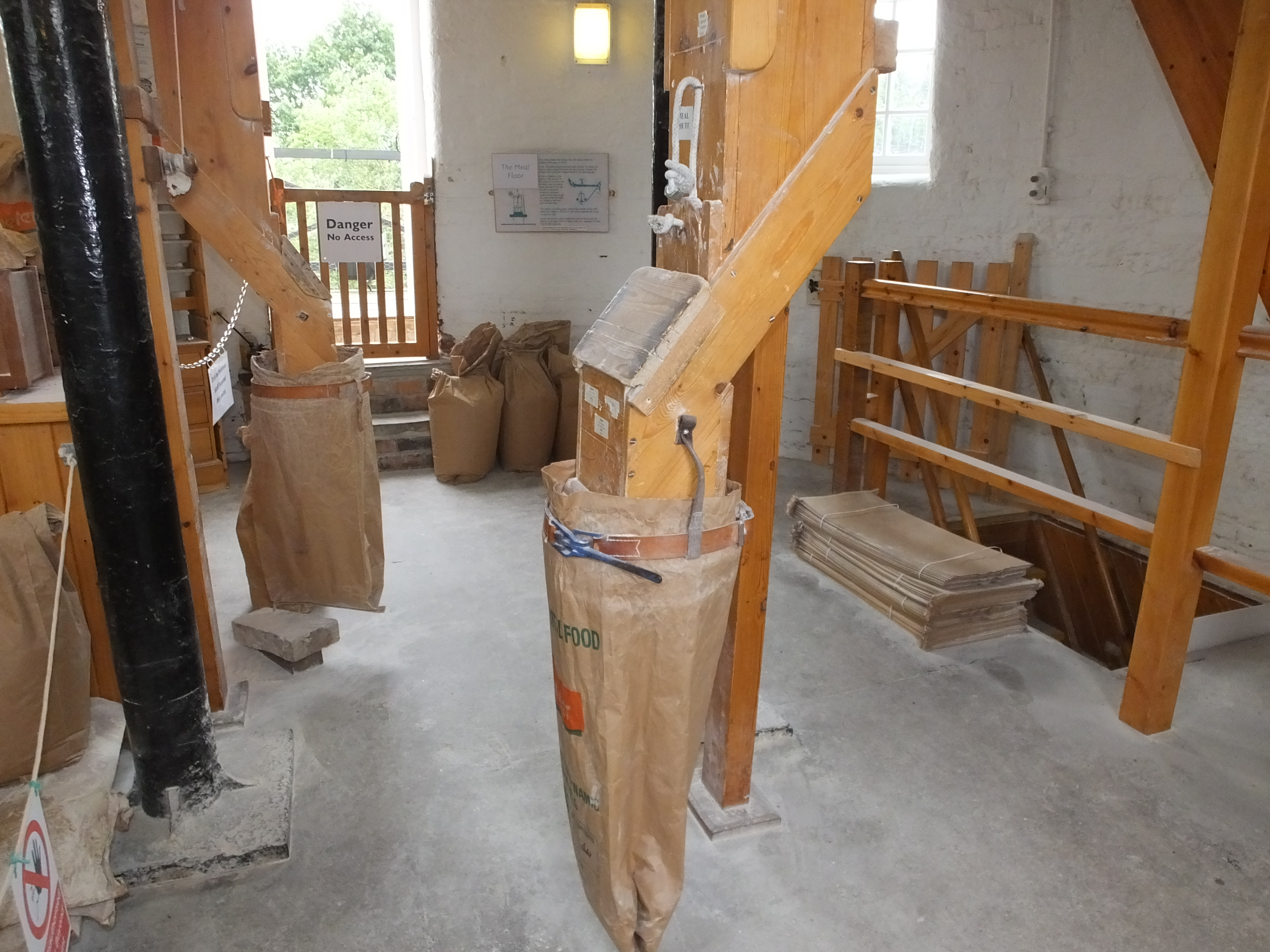
6) Meal is collected into sacks beneath the millstones

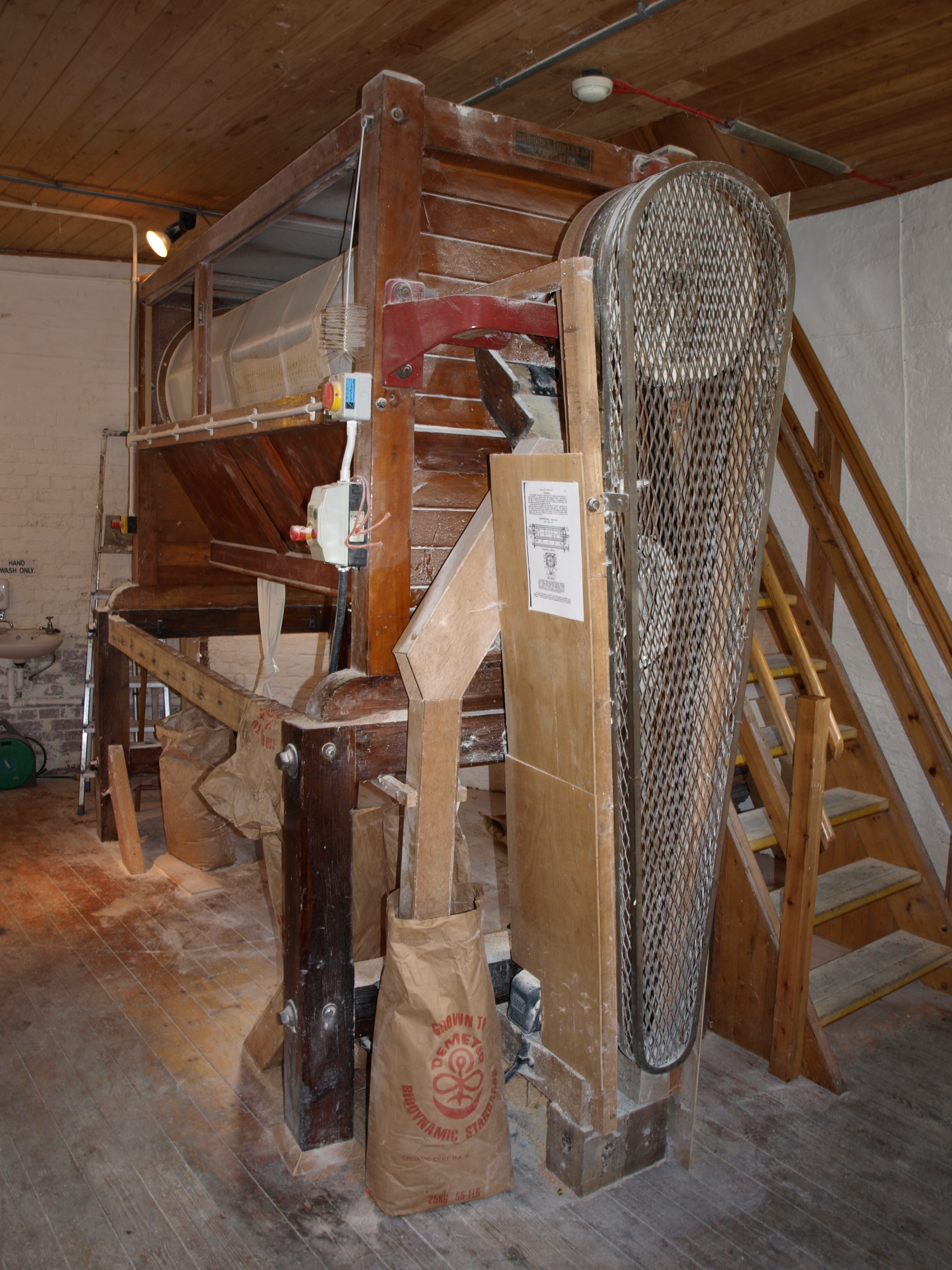
7) Meal is passed through the dresser, which sorts into wholemeal and white flour

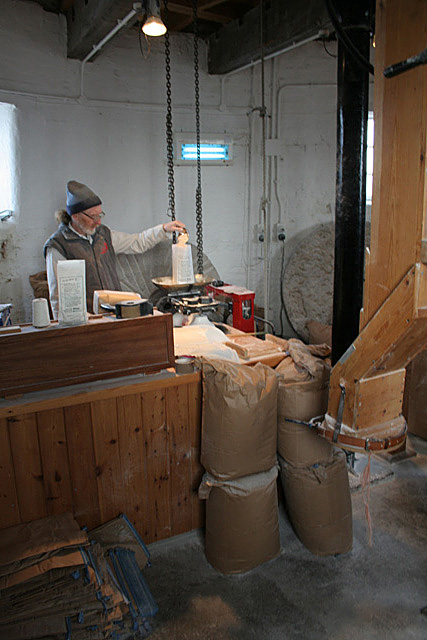
8) Flour is bagged and sold to tourists

== Popular culture ==
Green's windmill appeared in an episode of television crime drama Boon titled The Eyes of Texas which was filmed in 1989.

== See also ==
- Listed buildings in Nottingham (Dale ward)

== Bibliography ==
Historic England. "Green's Mill (Grade II) (1246256)". National Heritage List for England.
