= Burrows Court =

Tower block in Nottingham, England

Burrows Court Flats
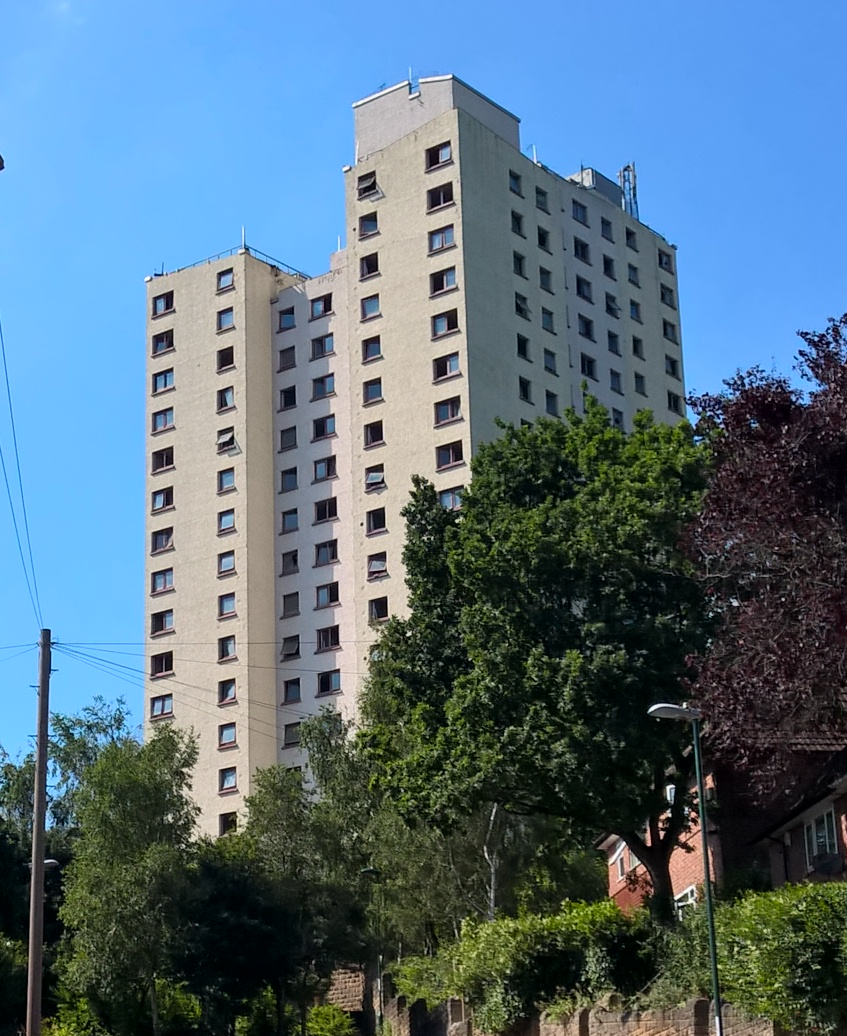
- Burrows Court in 2016
- Interactive map of the Burrows Court Flats area

General information
- Status: Complete; Under Refurbishment
- Type: Residential
- Architectural style: Brutalist / Modernist
- Location: Sneinton, Nottingham, England
- Coordinates: 52°57′24″N 1°07′34″W
- Construction started: 1966
- Completed: 1967

Height
- Roof: 61 metres (200 ft)
- Top floor: 20

Technical details
- Floor count: 21

Burrows Court is a high-rise residential building in the Sneinton neighbourhood in Nottingham, United Kingdom. Built in 1967 to a height of 61 metres (200 ft) with 21 floors, the tower block is the third tallest residential building in Nottingham. The building originally consisted of 130 one- and two-bedroom flats. Decommissioned by Nottingham City Council in 2005 due to low demand and drug dealing in the area, the building stood empty and was described as an "eyesore" until renovations were completed in 2021.

== History ==
Construction of the building began in 1966 and were completed a year later. The building was managed by Nottingham County Borough Council to meet the demand for local housing. Like many residential tower blocks built in the UK during this period, Burrows Court was seen as 'the future of housing', a modern and space-efficient building. The 130 flats were built from aggregate concrete, which later became an unpopular method of construction.

On 20 June 1984, a gas explosion at Burrows Court destroyed three flats and damaged seven storeys in the tower block, leaving 20 people homeless. Later that year, 63-year-old David Lloyd, who had been living in a ground-floor flat, pleaded guilty to 'unlawfully and maliciously causing an explosion likely to endanger life or cause serious injury to property'. Lloyd claimed that he had been angry at an upstairs neighbour playing loud music.

27 years after the residential building was first built, the tower went under a major refurbishment from 1994 to 1995. The exterior of the building was painted white; new windows were installed and the lifts were replaced.

Despite the refurbishment, nearly half of the flats in the building were vacant, and Nottingham City Council facing a bill of £4 million from refurbishments to the building. Crime, drug dealing and anti-social behaviour was being reported in the tower and the surrounding area.

The residential building was decommissioned in 2005, as the council concluded that there was "low demand due to inaccessible location and poor reputation for drug dealing in and around the block". The remaining tenants of the block of flats were re-housed by the Nottingham City Council, and it was subsequently sold to a private developer. Since then, the building stood empty and was commonly seen as a notorious eyesore known for its broken windows and crime rate; local residents complained that it looked like a "prison".

== Crime ==
Crime became a major issue in the tower and the surrounding area, before and after the building was sold and left vacant. Before the building was sold, the council was reporting offenses including drug dealing and anti-social behaviour, which was attributed to its isolated location.

In 2003, residents at Burrows Court told the BBC News Online that the council was doing nothing to address crime, drug dealing, and unhygienic conditions at the block of flats. Nottingham City Council reponsded that it was doing what it could, and that camera operators were monitoring CCTV footage at the site.

After the building was left empty, it became a hotspot for vandals, squatters and drug dealers. In 2012 the building was the scene of the murder of Kevin Kennedy, whose decapitated and armless body was found buried in a shallow grave adjacent to the building.

== Recent years ==
In 2018, developer Stace LLP planned to refurbish the residential building, as well as transforming the surrounding area with two 2-bedroom homes, a new block of flats consisting of 41 1-2 bedroom properties and new parking facilities.

Following renovation work, local residents reported that people began moving in at the end of 2021, causing the tower block to suddenly "[spring] back to life". In 2022, various newspapers reported that Burrows Court was being used to house asylum seekers and refugees who had arrived in Britain, although the Home Office refused to officially confirm this for safeguarding reasons.

Also in 2022, Nottingham City Council recommended planning permission to be granted for a new housing development at Burrows Court, comprising 15 houses and an apartment block with 41 flats.
