= Woodthorpe Grange Park =

Park in Nottingham, England

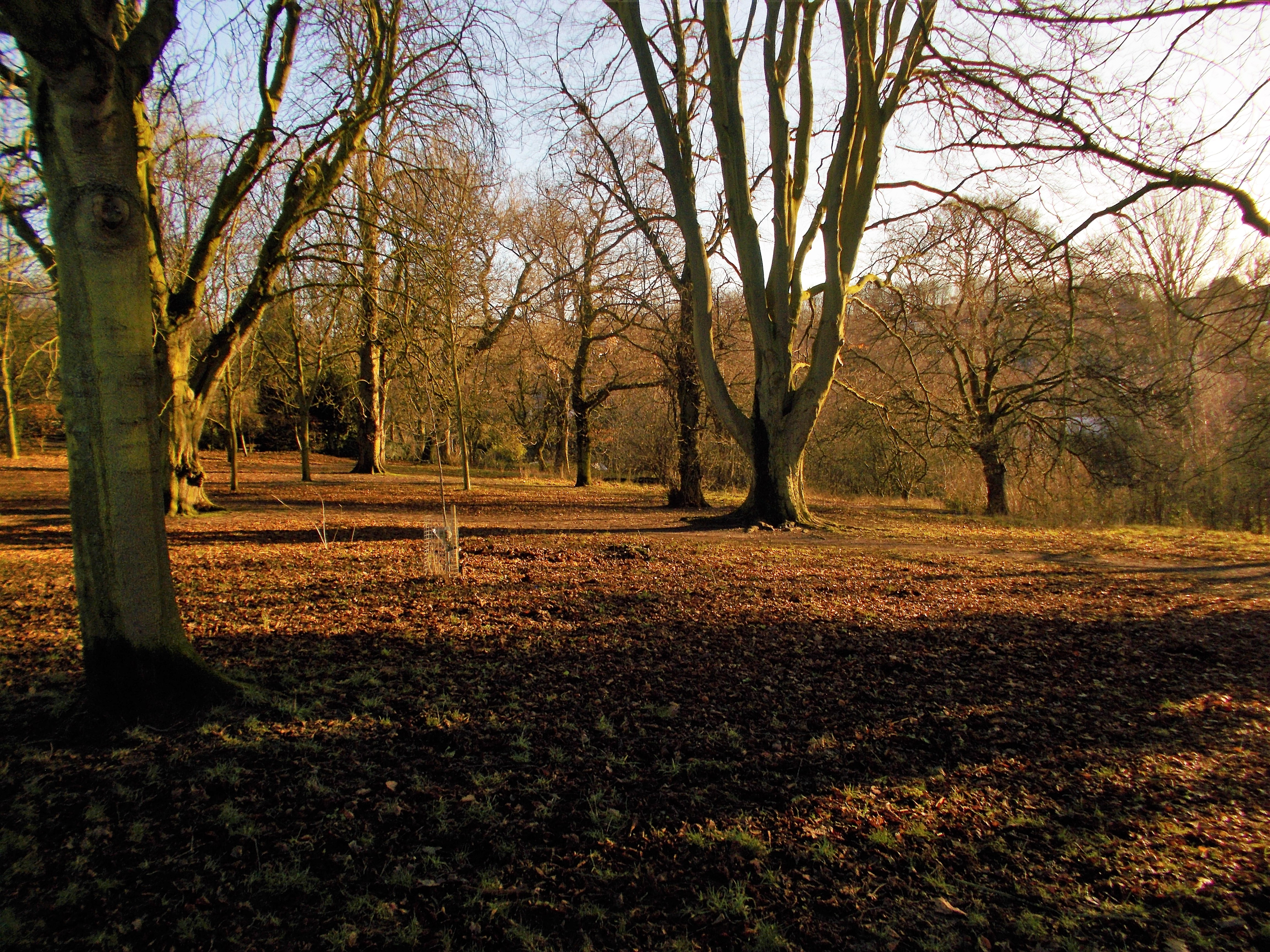
- The gardens at dusk
- Interactive map of Woodthorpe Grange Park
- Type: public
- Location: Woodthorpe, Nottingham, UK
- Coordinates: 52°59′04″N 1°08′08″W
- Created: 1874
- Operator: Nottingham City Council
- Awards: Green Flag

Woodthorpe Grange Park is a Green Flag–awarded public park located in Sherwood, Nottingham, Nottingham, on the northern edge of the city.

One of the largest parks in the city, it includes a tropical plant house, a nursery, formal landscaped gardens and a café. Sporting facilities include football pitches, a children’s play area and a pitch and putt course. Regular events are held in the park.

== History ==
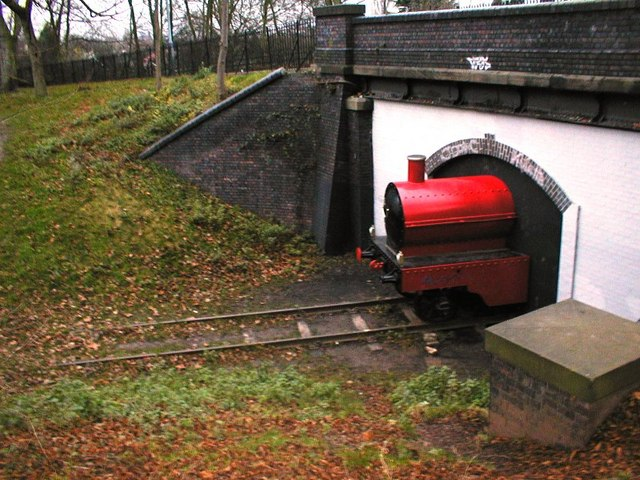
Train sculpture, Woodthorpe Grange Park.

The land the park stands on today was originally forested grazing land mainly used for pig farming. Woodthorpe Grange mansion was built in 1874 as the family home of industrialist Henry Ashwell. In 1889, the Nottingham Suburban Railway was built through the estate, running from north to south across and under it. Despite being compensated, Ashwell was unhappy about this and sold the property to Edward Parry, who had himself designed the railway that split the estate. In 1905, Parry sold the estate to a Nottingham city councillor. Meanwhile, the railway was struggling to survive with the opening of a tram from Nottingham City Centre to Sherwood.

Nottingham City Council bought the park in 1921 and opened it to the public a year later. Passenger services on the railway line ceased in 1931.

The line reopened for an enthusiasts’ event in 1951. Shortly afterwards the goods service ceased and the track was dismantled. All that exists today are a number of tunnels across the park.

Woodthorpe Grange today serves as the location of the city’s Department of Leisure and Community Services and is a Grade II listed building.
