= Water Head (sculpture) =

Sculpture in Beeston, Nottinghamshire, England

Coordinates: 52.925549°N 1.214502°W

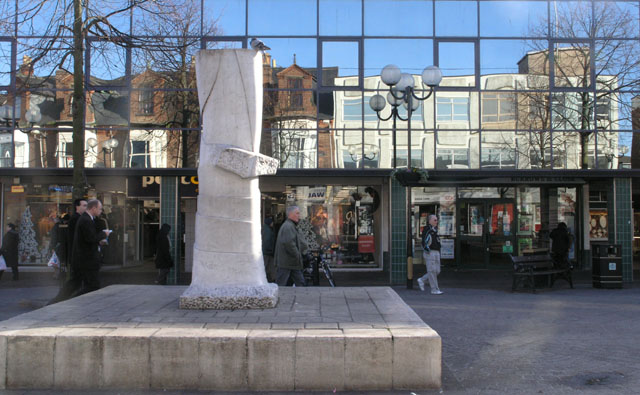
Water Head in The Square, Beeston, in 2007

Water Head is a 1989 sculpture in Beeston, Nottinghamshire. Water Head was commissioned by Broxtowe Borough Council in 1989 and created by local sculptor Paul Mason. It was originally created to be interactive with water that flowed down the height of sculpture, but the water was subsequently deactivated in 1994 after failing quality tests.

It was moved to a site in front of the Arc Cinema in July 2024, having been previously sited in Beeston Square.

It has been nicknamed the 'stump' by local residents. Tamar Feast of the Beeston Civic Society said that the work had been "undervalued and controversial".
