= Hilary Cartmel =

English sculptor

Hilary Cartmel (born 1958) is an English sculptor. She has created many public sculptures by commission, which stand in locations in Britain.

== Life ==
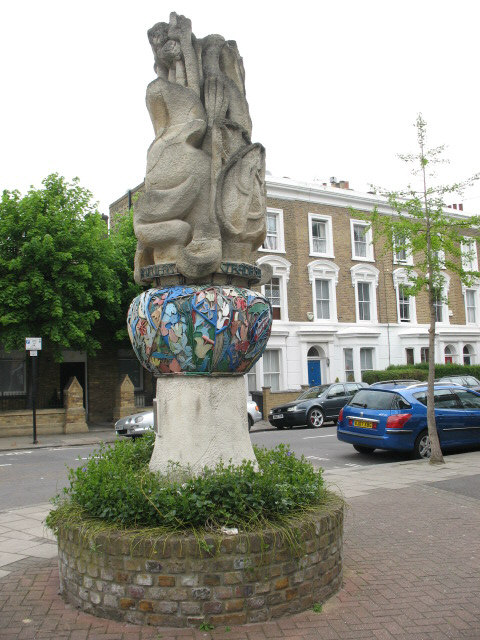
Tradescant memorial, in South Lambeth

Cartmel, born in Wendover in Buckinghamshire, studied at Exeter College of Art and Design from 1976 to 1977 and at Trent Polytechnic in Nottingham from 1977 to 1980. She has held residencies including Carlton Hayes Hospital and Grizedale Arts; she has exhibited studio work since 1980, and has held solo exhibitions.

== Works ==
Cartmel's works include the following:

"Tradescant Family Memorial", in South Lambeth, was commissioned by Public Art Development, Albert Square, and St Stephen's Residence Association. The sculpture of stone and steel, height 4.27 metres (14.0 ft), represents a vase of flowers, to commemorate the plant collectors the Tradescant family. It was unveiled by David Bellamy on 12 June 1988.

"Solidarity", of 1999, is in Spital Lane in Chesterfield, Derbyshire. It was commissioned by Chesterfield Borough Council. Figures made from steel plate are in the form of silhouettes. The artist worked with GCSE students from Hasland Hall Community School, to make a contemporary image based on Botticelli's Three Graces.

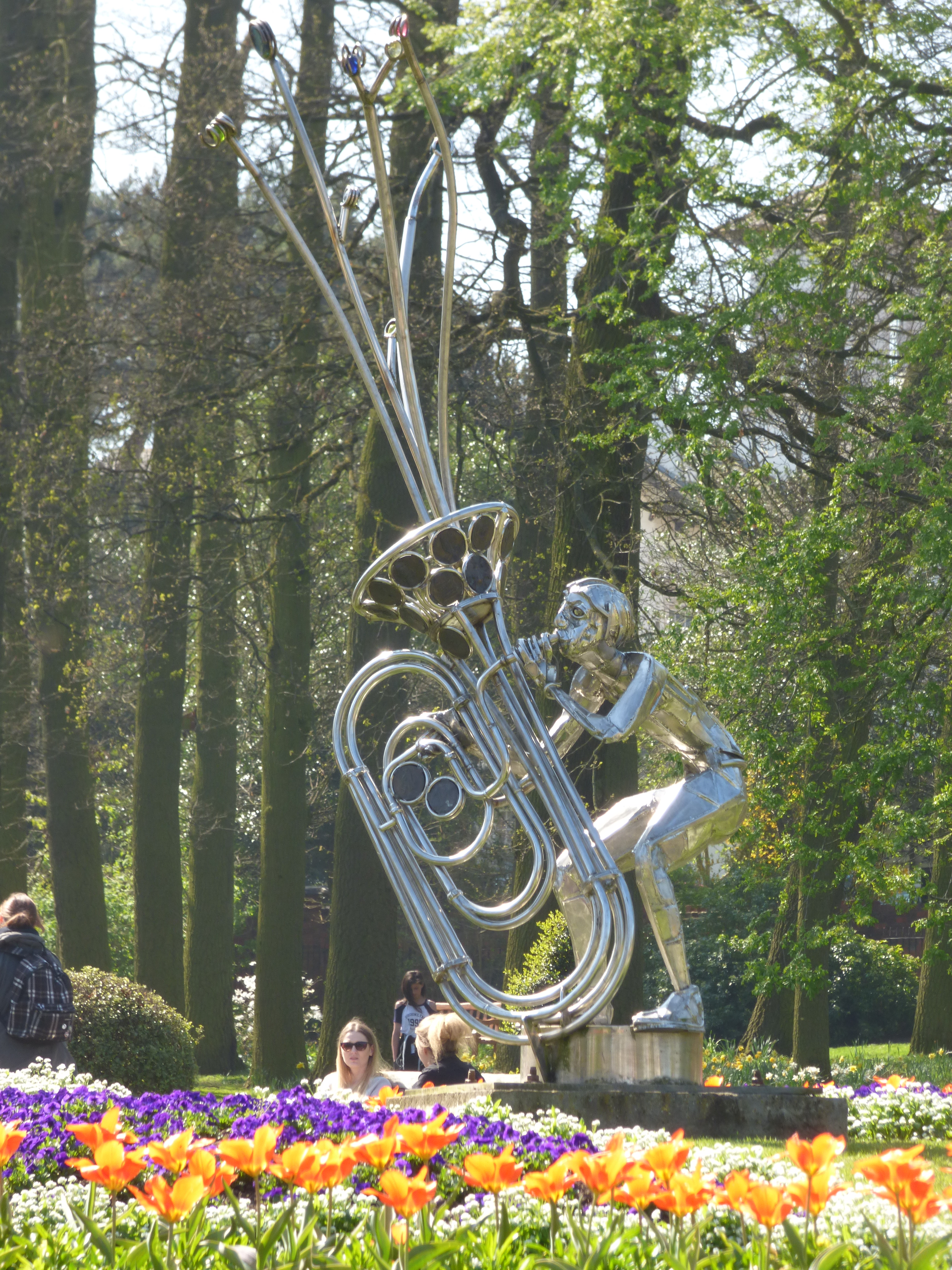
"Echo", in Caldecott Park, Rugby

"The Chorus Line", of 1999, is situated at the corner of Maid Marion Way and Park Row in Nottingham; it was commissioned by Nottingham City Council. It is a steel sculpture of dancing figures, designed as a signpost to local theatres.

"Henry Pease (1807–1881)", installed in 2002 on Marine Parade in Saltburn-by-the-Sea, North Yorkshire, wa commissioned by the New Saltburn Improvement Company. It is a statue by Cartmel and Michael Johnson, made from scrap metal, of Saltburn's founder Henry Pease.

"Echo", installed in 2009 in Caldecott Park, Rugby, Warwickshire, is a sculpture of stainless steel, bronze and cast glass, height 3 metres (9.8 ft), of a young man blowing into a tuba. It was commissioned by Rugby City Council, to replace a sculpture melted for the war effort. The artist has said that "it attempts to subvert the miserable life that the character is allotted in the Greek myth... in this case trying to blow notes from an enormous tuba".
