= St Stephen's Church, Sneinton =

Church in Nottinghamshire, England

Coordinates: 52°57′04″N 01°07′55″W

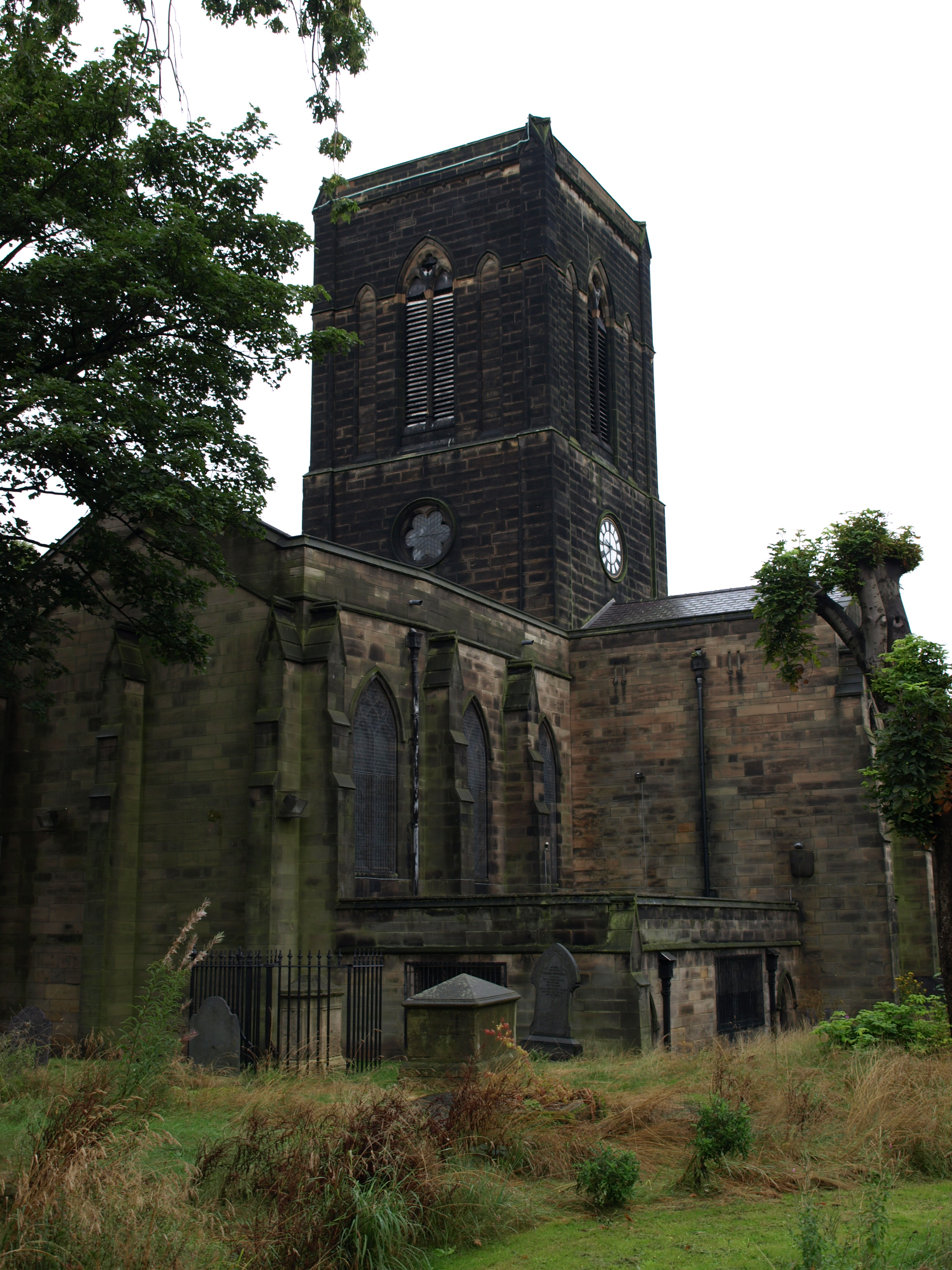
- St Stephen's Church, Sneinton, Nottingham
- St Stephen's Church, Sneinton
- Denomination: Church of England
- Churchmanship: Contemporary Evangelical & Anglo Catholic
- Website: www.ststephens.info

History
- Dedication: St Stephen

Administration
- Province: York
- Diocese: Southwell and Nottingham
- Parish: Sneinton, Nottingham

Clergy
- Priest: Lynda Blakeley

St Stephen's Church, Sneinton is a parish church in the Church of England. It is the parish church of the Sneinton suburb of Nottingham, Nottinghamshire, England.

The church is Grade II listed by the Department for Digital, Culture, Media and Sport as it is a building of special architectural or historic interest. The parents of D. H. Lawrence married in the church on 27 December 1875.

== History ==
The church dates back to medieval times, and was served from Lenton Priory. From the Dissolution of the Monasteries the church was served mostly by clergy from St Mary's Church, Nottingham until it became a parish is its own right in 1866.

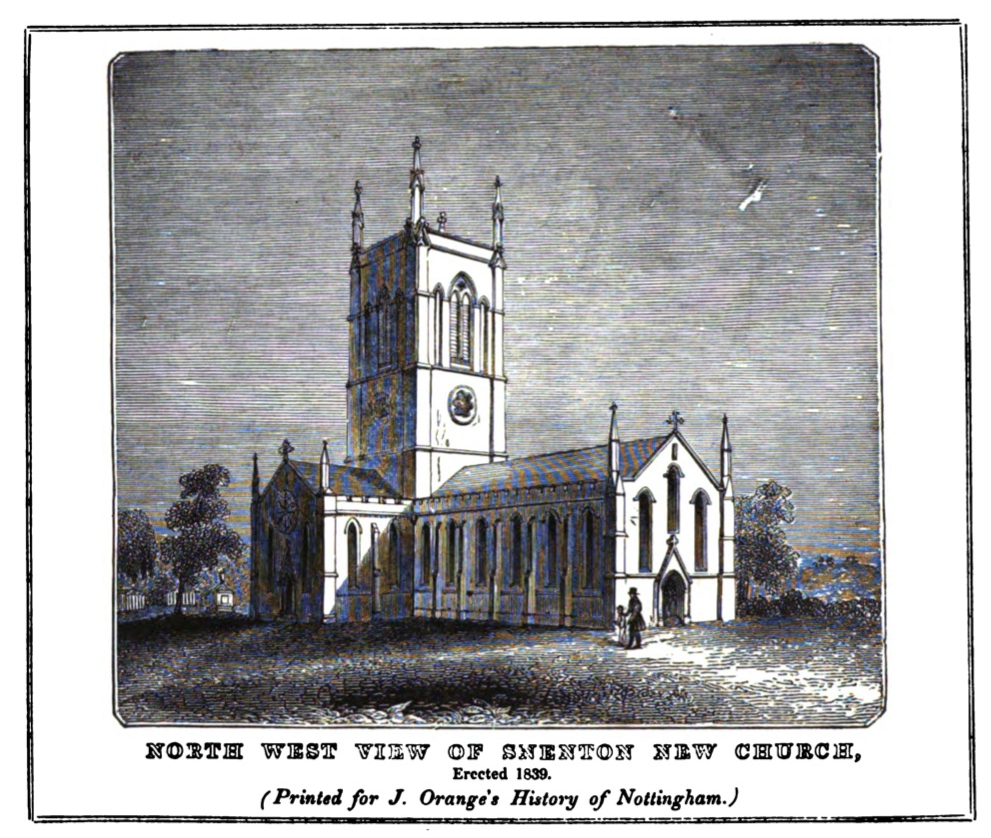
The church from The History and Antiquities of Nottingham by James Orange, 1840

The current building dates from 1837 and it was designed by Thomas Rickman and built by W. Surplice of Nottingham. It was one of the earliest Gothic Revival buildings in Nottinghamshire. It is a Commissioners' church, having been given a grant towards the cost of its construction by the Church Building Commission; the full cost of the church was £4,511 (equivalent to £400,000 in 2025), towards which the Commission granted £1,303.

The church's early catholic liturgy was noted by Wylie in 1853, and it was the first church in Nottingham to introduce a surpliced choir - "There is a male choir, the members of which are dressed in surplices. This is the only Protestant place of worship in the neighbourhood where this and other kindred practices, such as intoning the prayers, prevail." Compare this with nearby St Mary's Church, Nottingham which did not introduce surplices for the choir until 1868.

The church was extended between 1909 and 1912 and Cecil Greenwood Hare to designs by George Frederick Bodley.

Following the closure of St Matthias' Church, Nottingham in 2003 the parish is now known as St Stephen and St Matthias.

== Clock ==
A new clock with four dials was installed in the tower by Reuben Bosworth. It was started on 26 December 1865. It was the gift of William Tomlin Esq and cost over £120. In 1967 Nottingham Corporation designated it as a public clock and took over responsibility for maintenance.

== Features ==
The reredos to the high altar was designed by George Frederick Bodley and carved in Oberammergau. It features scenes from the life of Christ.

The choir stalls date from the fourteenth or fifteenth century and were originally from St Mary's Church, Nottingham. They were acquired by the organist of St. Stephen's in 1848. They contain fine medieval misericords which have carved figures.

== Incumbents ==
- 1596-1616 Robert Aldridge (also Vicar of St Mary's)
- 1617-1635 Ralph Hansby (also Vicar of St Mary's)
- 1635-1642 Edmund Lacocks (also Vicar of St Mary's)
- 1650 James Jollie
- 1664-1666 Charles Parry (also Rector of Colwick 1662-82)
- 1667 John Scrimshaw
- 1668 Thomas Houghton, also Rector of St Giles Church, West Bridgford 1673-92, also Rector of St Peter's Church, Tollerton 1689-92
- 1675 Charles Parry, also Rector of Colwick 1662-80
- 1681-1684 John Littlefere
- 1686-1704 Abraham Heckstall
- 1704-1723 Thomas Fenton (also Vicar of St Mary's Church, Arnold 1701-21)
- 1724-1728 John Nagger (also Vicar of St Giles's Church, Cropwell Bishop 1708-35)
- 1728-1731 John Swale (also Vicar of St Peter's Church, Radford, also Vicar of St Mary's Church, Car Colston)
- 1732-1735 Joseph Malbon
- 1736-1743 Thomas Beardsmore (also Vicar of St Mary's)
- 1743-1770 Scrope Berdmore (also Vicar of St Mary's)
- 1770-1786 Nathan Haines (also Vicar of St Mary's)
- 1786-1817 Robert Fox (also Vicar of St Bartholomew's Church, Kneesall from 1806)
- 1818-1831 George Wilkins (also Vicar of St Mary's)
- 1831-1868 William Hindes Whyatt
- 1868-1884 Vernon Wallaston Hutton (later Canon of Lincoln Cathedral)
- 1885-1888 Thomas Windley
- 1889-1895 Francis Edward Nugee
- 1895-1902 Arthur Murray Dale
- 1902-1917 The Hon Robert Margill Dalrymple (son of John Dalrymple, 10th Earl of Stair )
- 1917-1919 Booth Hodgett Lynes
- 1919-1954 James Raw Thomas
- 1955-1958 Fr. Morris
- 1959-1987 John Tyson
- 1988-1996 Derek Hales
- 1996-1998 Michael Thompson
- 2001-2002 Rodney Frederic Brittain Smith (also Vicar of St Matthias' Church, Nottingham)
- 2003 M G Crook

== Pathé News ==
The church featured in a 1959 British Pathé newsreel, which showed Reverend John Tyson, the local vicar, encouraging young people back to church. They helped with the cleaning, attended evening service and in return were able to build a cafe and rock 'n' roll club in the vicarage.

== Organ ==
The small pipe organ obtained in 1840 was sold in 1871 to St Giles Church, West Bridgford. The church replaced this at a cost of £450 with an organ by Brindley & Foster in 1872. The organ was dedicated at Harvest Festival on 19 September 1872 when it was played by Herbert Stephen Irons, Rector Chori and Organist of Southwell Minster.

This organ was enlarged in 1888. Further work was carried out by Cousans and Sons in 1901 when it was moved from the chancel and rebuilt. Later Ernest Wragg and Sons undertook further work.

=== Organists ===
- William Henry Willcockson ???? - 1848
- Thomas Smith 1848 - 1864
- W.F. Horners ca. 1881
- Charles F.C Hole 1882 - ????
- H.G. Hamilton 1903 - ????
- Jabez Hack ca. 1920 - 1941

== See also ==
- Listed buildings in Nottingham (Dale ward)
