= Daimler Double-Six sleeve-valve V12 =

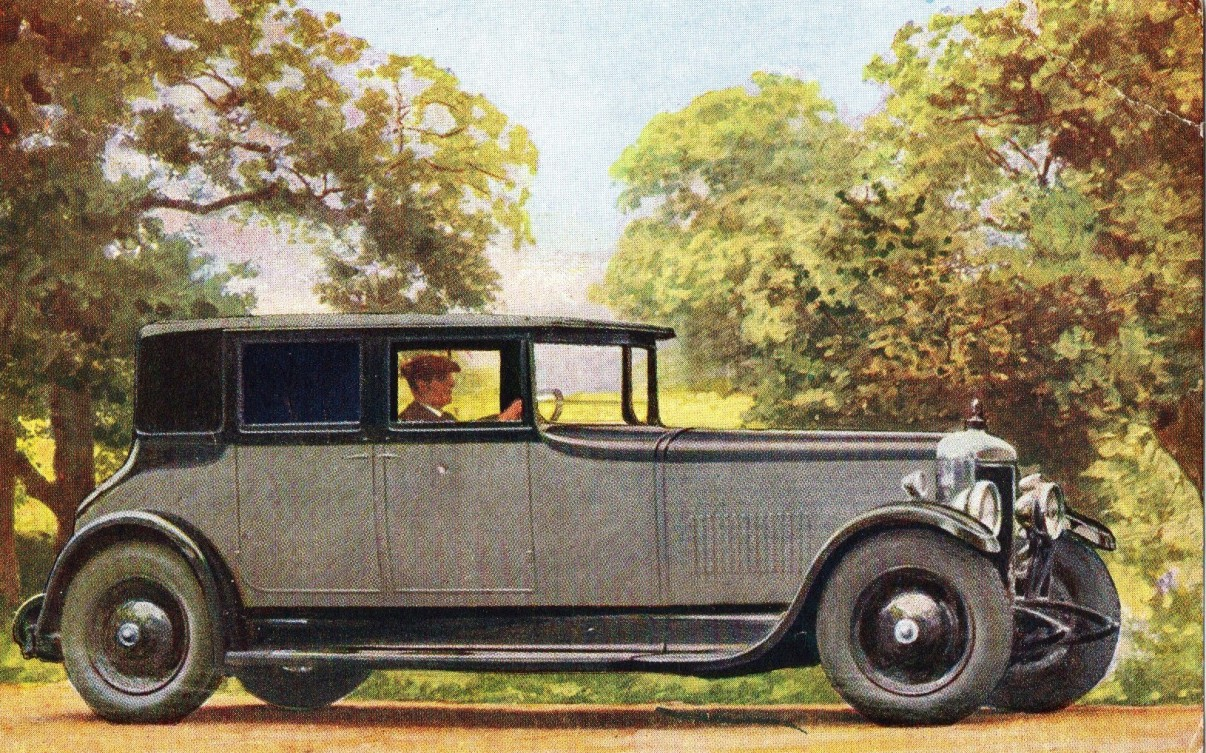
The engine of this 1926 Daimler saloon de luxe is the new 12-cylinder Daimler sleeve valve unit. The coachwork is in three shades of grey.

The Daimler Double-Six sleeve-valve V12 was a piston engine manufactured by The Daimler Company Limited of Coventry, England between 1926 and 1938. It was offered in four different sizes for their flagship cars.

The same Daimler Double-Six name was used for the badge-engineered Daimler V12 engine used in the largest Daimlers between 1972 and 1997.

== Origins ==
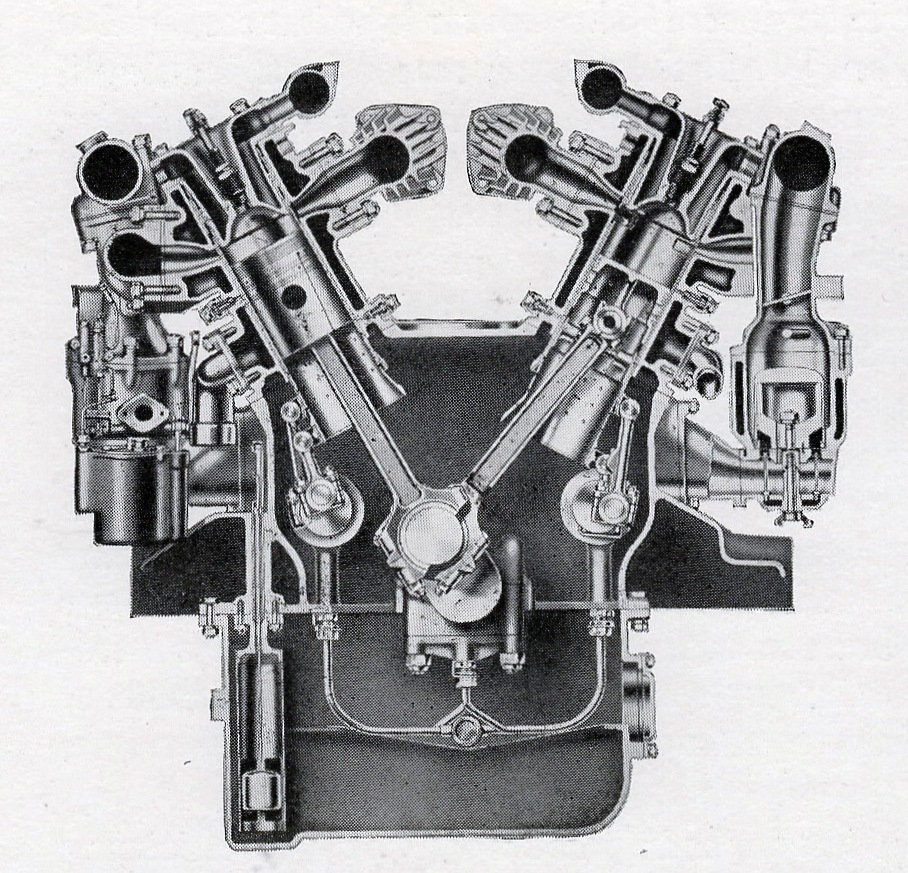
Daimler Double-Six (V12) 50 hp (37 kW) sleeve-valve engine 1927-30 transverse section

Daimler required an advanced new model to compete with Rolls-Royce's New Phantom of 1925. Though Packard had introduced its Twin-Six many years earlier it was to be a decade or more before luxury manufacturers like Rolls-Royce, Hispano-Suiza, Lincoln, Voisin and Lagonda made their own (and Packard returned to it). In fact by the mid-1930s flexible engine mountings and improved carburetion had made so many cylinders unnecessary. What did return them to a certain level of popularity was the push for higher performance requiring higher crankshaft speeds. Daimler introduced their first 26 hp (19 kW) straight-eight in mid-1934 and their last (poppet valve) V12s were built in 1937 or 1938.

From 1929, Daimler Double-Sixes were distinguishable from the six-cylinder cars by a chromium bar down the centre of the radiator. A similar distinguishing mark was placed on the later Jaguar-made versions.

Aside from Daimler, only Voisin in France ever attempted production of a sleeve-valve V12 engine. Voisin's production—between 1929 and 1937—was "minimal and spasmodic."

Lofty England, (Note: F R W England and J Mercer drove a Double-Six to second place (to a 15/18 Lanchester) in the 1932 RAC Rally (Douglas-Scott-Montagu & Burgess-Wise 1995, pp. 220, 221)) a Daimler apprentice 1927–1932, joined Jaguar in 1946 and became its chief executive. He ensured the Double-Six name was used for the Jaguar V12 when installed in Daimler cars.

== Design ==
This engine was designed by (Note: This information may relate to the second series 30/40 and 40/50 engines with alloy blocks. Pomeroy was in the United States until October 1926 (Douglas-Scott-Montagu & Burgess-Wise 1995, p. 199) and, it appears, could not have designed the first series, which was exhibited to the public that month.) consultant Chief Engineer L H Pomeroy (1883-1941) to achieve high power with quietness and, particularly, smoothness. Pomeroy made the engine by taking the cylinder blocks of two existing 25/85 hp Daimler engines and putting them on a common crankcase. Pomeroy was appointed managing director in 1929. The same design was produced in different sizes depending on the different engine displacements.

== 7.1-litre Double-Six 50 ==
Daimler Double-Six (50)
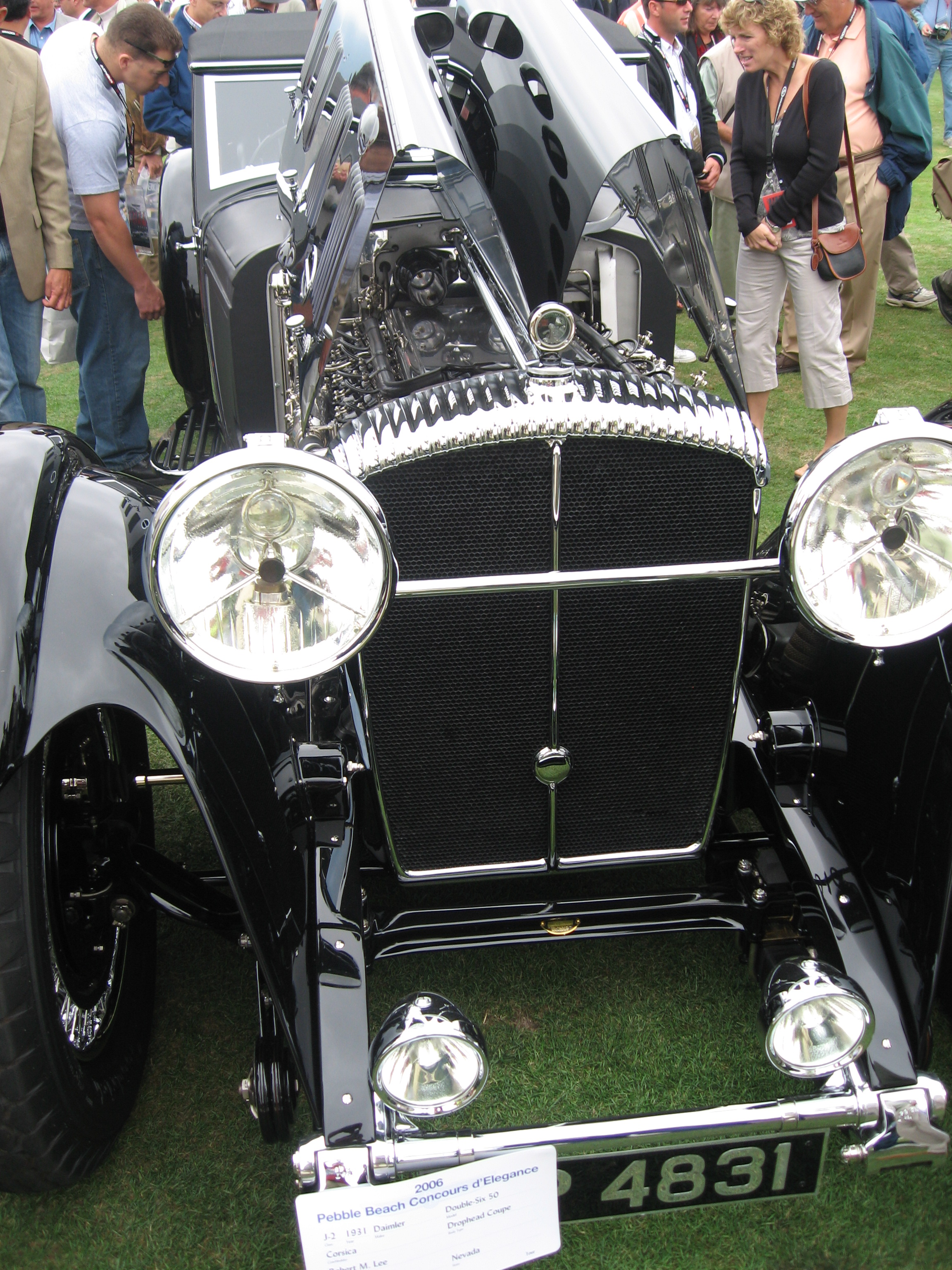

Overview
- Manufacturer: The Daimler Company Limited
- Also called: Daimler Double-Six
- Production: 1926–1930

Layout
- Configuration: 60 degree V12
- Displacement: 7.136 litres (435 cu in)
- Cylinder bore: 81.5 mm (3.2 in)
- Piston stroke: 114 mm (4.5 in)
- Cylinder block material: Cast iron, cast in blocks of 3 cylinders Alloy pistons running in light steel sleeve-valves
- Cylinder head material: Cast iron? detachable, separate head for each block
- Valvetrain: Sleeve-valves, double light steel sleeves operated by pushrod from chain-driven eccentric shafts in the engine block

Combustion
- Fuel system: Twin 7-jet Daimler carburettors with pre-heated air supply, petrol supplied by mechanical pump mounted near the carburettor. Ignition by two magnetos and battery and coil
- Fuel type: Petrol
- Oil system: Submerged pump, separate radiator
- Cooling system: Water: belt-driven four-blade fan and radiator

Output
- Power output: 150 bhp (110 kW; 150 PS) at 2,480 rpm

Chronology
- Predecessor: 57 hp inline six-cylinder
- Successor: Double-Six 40/50

=== Engine ===
Announced 15 October 1926 and observed by The Observer's motoring correspondent to be Britain's first twelve-cylinder car engine.

Bore × stroke measurements of 81.5 mm × 114 mm (3.2 in × 4.5 in) gave a swept volume of 7.1 L (7,136 cc; 435.5 cu in). Power output is 150 bhp (110 kW; 150 PS) at 2480 rpm. The taxable power rating is 50 hp

- Cylinders are arranged in blocks of three
- Pistons were of light alloy and split-skirted "like the modern girl"
- Double light steel sleeves operated by short connecting rods from their eccentric-shafts controlled the inlet of fuel and the outlet of exhaust
- Separately detachable cylinder heads
- 60 degree angle V
- Crankcase is of aluminium
- The big-ends lay in pairs, the right-hand ones forked so that diagonal pairs of cylinders were in the same plane
- Connecting rods were H-section
- Crankshaft ran in seven bearings and had an external Lanchester-type vibration damper at the front
- Two sleeve-operating eccentric-shafts were driven by chain at the rear of the engine each ran in four bearings
- Daimler seven-jet carburettor, water-pump, magneto, exhaust pipe and silencer were duplicated, each block of cylinders having its own components
- Petrol was supplied to a reservoir by the engine from the rear-mounted tank by air pressure
- Each Daimler carburettor had an independent pre-heated air supply and four jets plus a primer which acted as a pilot with a separate air supply
- Inlet manifolds were water-heated and mounted on the outside of each cylinder block
- With the primer lubricant was passed to the cylinders and with the depression of the starter pedal oil delivered to the lower end of the sleeves
- Oil was forced to the main and big-end bearings, the sleeve-shafts and the sleeves
- Oil was cooled through a radiator

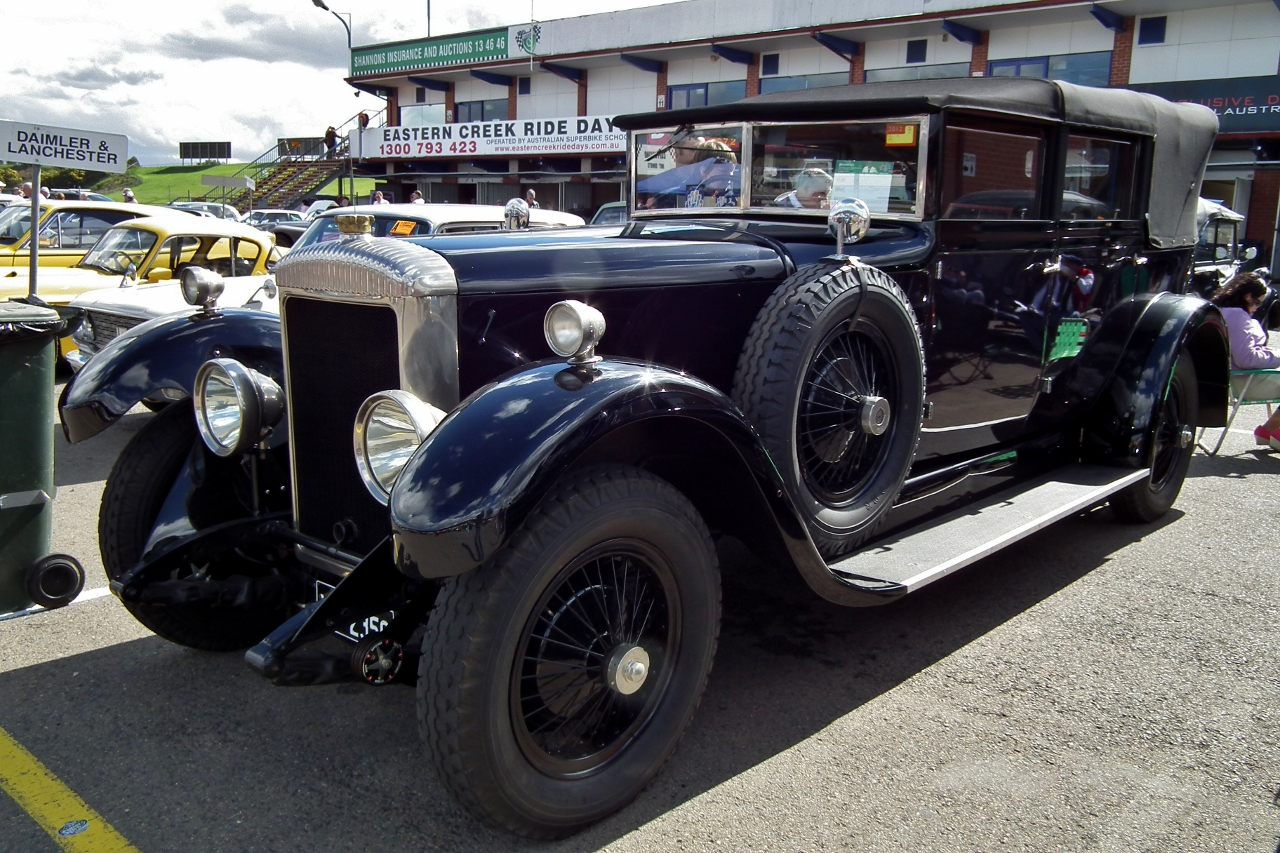
35/120 "His 35/120 hp cars were nothing like worn out, so instead of ordering the new model the King had "Double-Six" engines installed in his existing Daimlers. However, by the end of 1927 His Majesty had taken delivery of a complete V12 model"

- Cylinder layout is:

6a 5a 4a 3a 2a 1a
1b 2b 3b 4b 5b 6b

Firing order is: 1b 1a, 5b 5a, 3b 3a, 6b 6a, 2b 2a, 4b 4a

- A dual ignition was fitted
- Distributors were coupled as were all the change-over switches from the coil to magneto ignition
- Magnetos and water pumps were driven through transverse shafts by skew gearing from the nose of the crankshaft
- Dynamo operated by silent chain
- Two vertical shafts from the same source drove contact breakers and distributors set above the cylinder banks
- Belt-driven four-bladed radiator fan
- Fuel was pumped from the rear tank by air pressure from a mechanical pump mounted near the carburettor

The exhaust pipes passed through the V of the cylinder blocks and were covered with an aluminium plate to dissipate heat.
The engine and clutch were mounted as a unit separately from the gearbox

The result was an engine which idled at 150 rpm and ran with uncanny silence "the only audible sound made by a Double-Six (if you opened the bonnet and went right up to it) was the almost imperceptible tick as the ignition points opened and the faint breathing of the carburettor".

This largest engine faded from the catalogue after 1930.

=== Chassis ===
- Chassis frame was channel section
- Gearbox: driven through a single dry plate disc clutch mounted on the engine a separate four-speeds and reverse gearbox was mounted on a very substantial cross-member and controlled by a central ball-gate gear lever.
- Hand brake operated shoes in a brake drum mounted at the back of the gearbox
- Power was taken by open propeller-shaft with metal universal joints to a (virtually silent) underslung worm-drive to the rear axle
- Suspension was by gaitered half-elliptic leaf springs - beneath the axle at the back
- Brakes on four wheels were rod-operated with assistance from a Dewandre vacuum servo positioned beside the gearbox. Adjustment could be made by hand
- Steering: the width of the engine necessitated mounting the worm and sector reduction box on the scuttle. From there a coupling lever dropped to a bell-crank pivoted on the chassis side-member. A normal drag-link ran to the front axle.
- Wheelbase:

Type O wheelbase 155.5 in (3,950 mm) Track 60.0 in (1,524 mm)
Type P wheelbase 163.0 in (4,140 mm) Track 60.0 in (1,524 mm)
Type W wheelbase 155.5 in (3,950 mm) Track 57.0 in (1,448 mm)

- Tyres:

7.3 in × 37 in (185 mm × 940 mm) or
6.75 in × 33 in (171 mm × 838 mm) or
6.75 in × 35 in (171 mm × 889 mm)

- Dimensions of standard saloon de luxe:

Length 223 in (5,664 mm)
Width 76 in (1,930 mm)
Height 82 in (2,083 mm)

=== Prices ===
- Chassis prices: Type O £1,850, Type P £1,950, Type W £1,950
- Standard saloon de luxe by Daimler £2,450
- Standard enclosed limousine by Daimler £2,800

== 3.7-litre Double-Six 30 ==
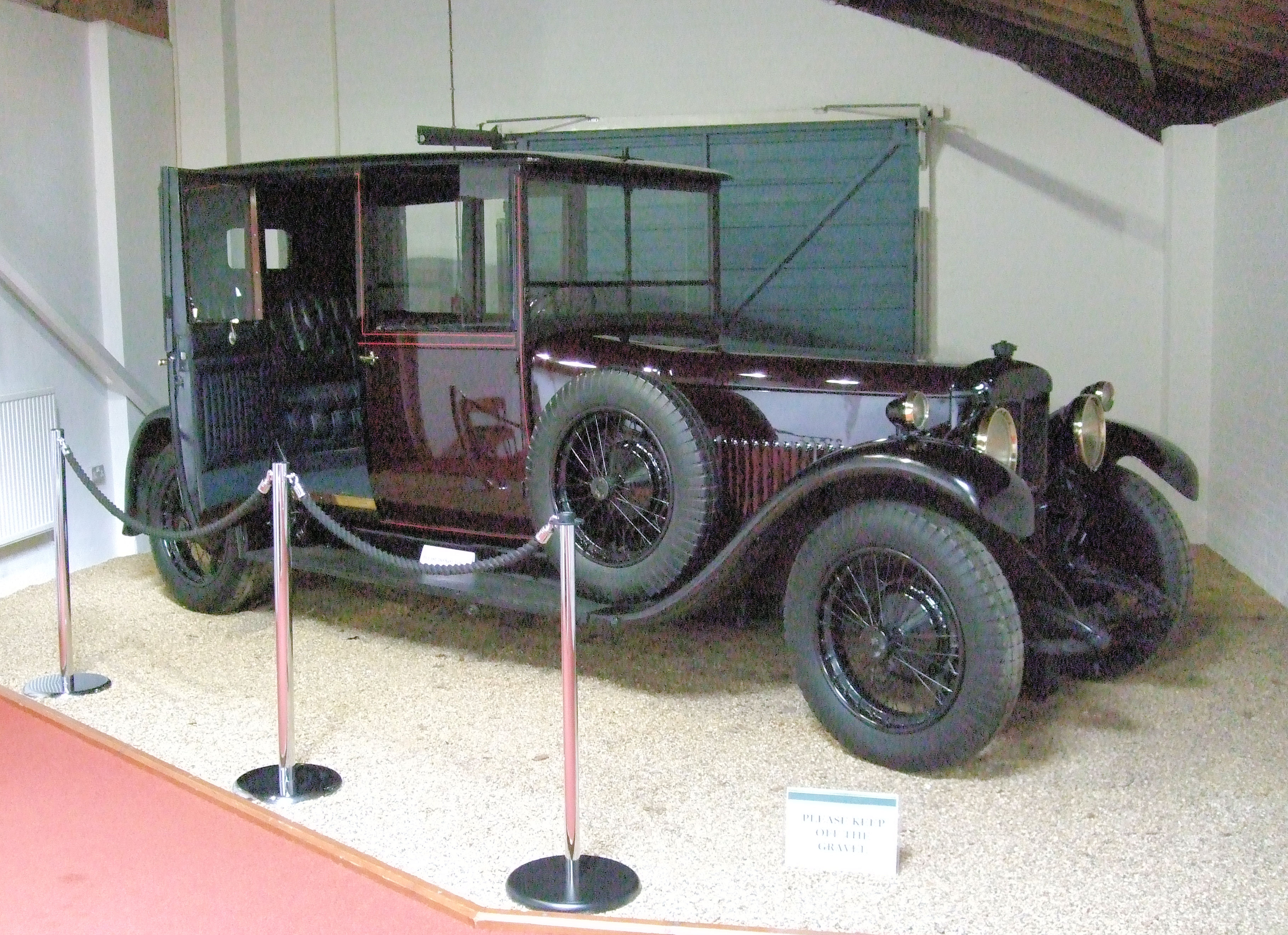
Double-Six 30 brougham

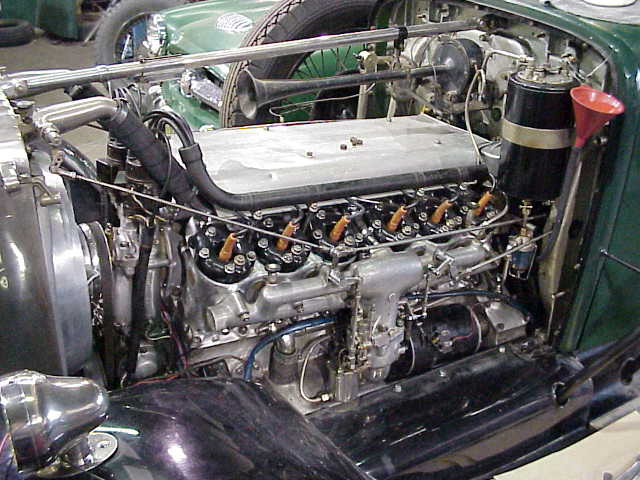
Engine nearside

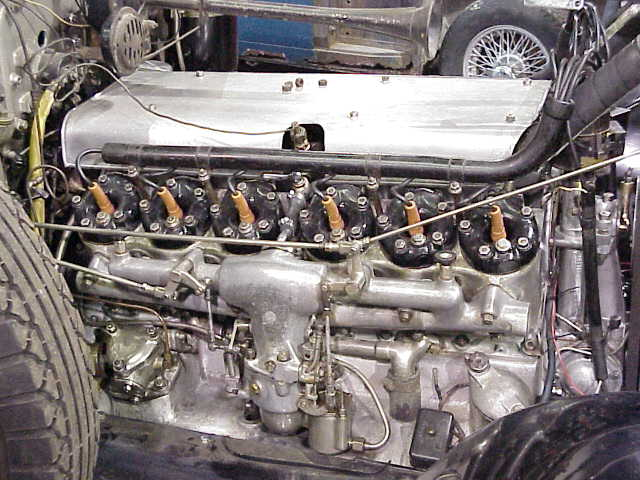
Engine offside

This version was announced on 1 August 1927, formed around a pair of 16/55 cylinder blocks.

Bore x stroke are 65 mm × 94 mm (2.6 in × 3.7 in), giving a swept volume of 3.7 L (3,744 cc; 228.5 cu in). Power output is 100 bhp (75 kW; 100 PS),
Tax rating 31.4 hp

=== Design change ===
Petrol was lifted to a reservoir by the engine from the rear-mounted tank by Autovac

- Wheelbase:

Type Q wheelbase 131 in (3,327 mm) Track 52.0 in (1,321 mm)
Type M wheelbase 141.0 in (3,581 mm) Track 52.0 in (1,321 mm)
Type V wheelbase 142.0 in (3,607 mm) Track 54.0 in (1,372 mm)
Type O wheelbase 145.0 in (3,683 mm) Track 60.0 in (1,524 mm)

- Tyres:

5.25 in × 31 in (133 mm × 787 mm) on the coupé tested by The Times

- Dimensions of standard saloon:

Length 190 in (4,826 mm)
Width 65 in (1,651 mm)
Height 72 in (1,829 mm)

=== Prices ===
- Chassis prices:
- Standard saloon by Daimler £1.300

Production ended in 1932, none with fluid flywheel and pre-selector gearbox.

== 5.3-litre Double-Six 30/40 or Light Double-Six ==
Announced October 1930 and matched with the new Daimler fluid flywheel and Wilson pre-selective half-automatically changing four-speed gearbox.

Bore x stroke measurements of 73 mm × 104 mm (2.9 in × 4.1 in) give a swept volume of 5.3 L (5,296 cc; 323.2 cu in). The taxable rating is 40.18 hp.

In November 1930 a car was shipped to Edsel Ford with the new Daimler transmission. It aroused so much interest Cadillac's chief engineer, Ernest Seaholm, came to the following Olympia show and bought another for technical investigation. It inspired Earl Thompson, who invented synchromesh, to develop the Hydramatic transmission.

This light double-six was one of the first cars designed using ergonomics. Switches buttons and stalks were all placed within finger tip reach of the driver and accessible without removing their hands from the steering wheel. The cars would run up to 40,000 miles (64,000 km) before requiring engine decarbonisation.

=== Design changes ===
Engine

Cylinder block a one-piece light alloy casting
Distributors were moved to the back of the engine
Cover plates provided in the crankcase which could be removed to reveal the sleeve-eccentric links
Carburettors moved forward
Lubrication by two submerged helical-gear pumps, one feeding all moving parts, the other circulating oil through the oil radiator
Oil radiator to maintain a constant 54 °C (130 °F)
Cold viscid oil forced open valves allowing oil into troughs below the big-ends to provide cold-start splash lubrication of the sleeves
Hand-operated oil cleaner
Water pumps on outside of each cylinder bank mounted in tandem with dynamos

This model was usually supplied with a taller and more slender radiator.

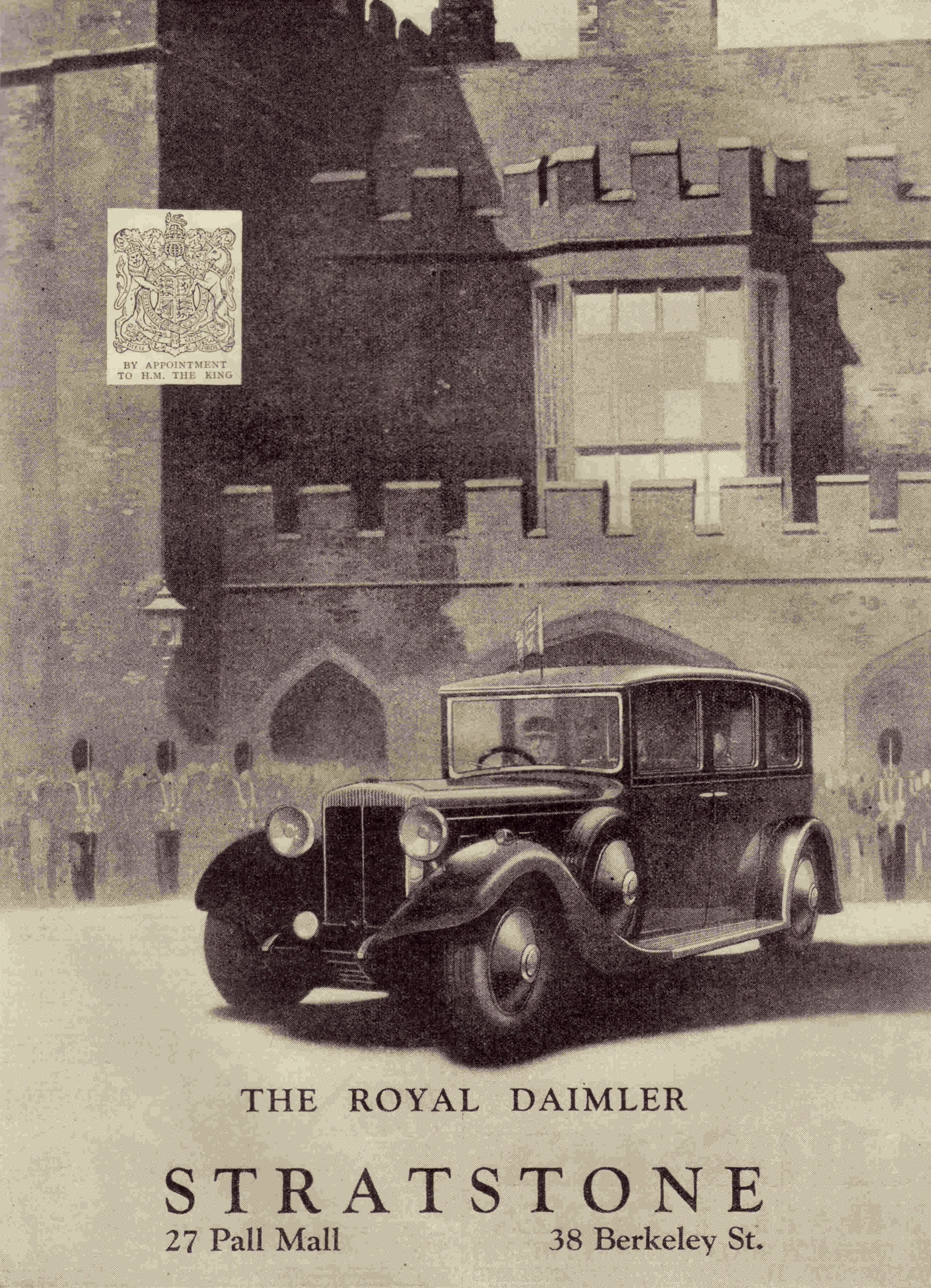
Double-Six 40/50 limousine for King George V

Chassis

Grouped chassis lubrication
Back axle incorporating dip-stick cum oiling syringe
Hydraulic shock absorbers

- Wheelbase:

Short wheelbase 138 in (3,505 mm) Track 60.0 in (1,524 mm)
Medium wheelbase 147.5 in (3,746 mm) Track 60.0 in (1,524 mm)
Long wheelbase 157.0 in (3,988 mm) Track 60.0 in (1,524 mm)

=== Prices ===
- Chassis prices: Short £1,100, Medium £1,200, Long £1,350
- Short wheelbase standard saloon by Daimler from £1,600
- Medium wheelbase limousine by Daimler from £1,900
- Long wheelbase limousine by Daimler from £2,300

== 6.5-litre Double-Six 40/50 ==
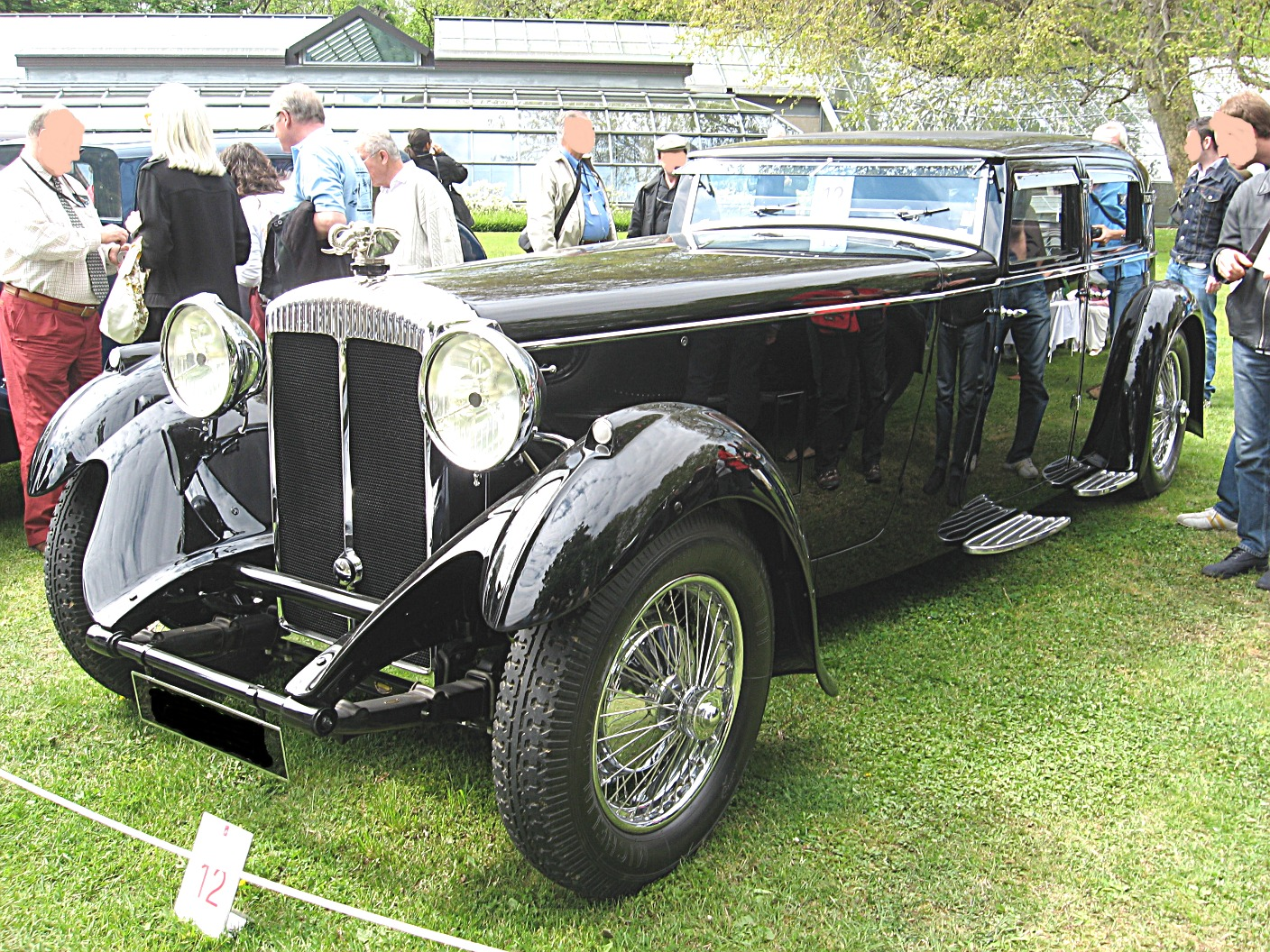
Double-Six 40/50 close-coupled 4-door sports saloon by Martin Walter 1932 for Anna Neagle

Announced October 1930 and matched with the new Daimler Fluid Flywheel and Wilson pre-selective half-automatically changing four-speed gearbox.

Bore x stroke measures of 81.5 mm × 104 mm (3.2 in × 4.1 in) gave a swept volume of 6.5 L (6,511 cc; 397.3 cu in). The taxable power rating is 49.4 hp.

The cylinder block is a one-piece light alloy casting.

== Double-Six 40/50 with poppet valves ==
From 1935 to 1938 nine Double-Six 40/50 engines were made with poppet valves - possibly to use surplus components.

== Performance ==
The Autocar reported in April 1927 the big cars needed no other gears once they were rolling, even climbing a hill. Petrol consumption was not so savage as might have been expected at 10 miles per imperial gallon (28 l/100 km; 8.3 mpg_{‑US}). "2 to 82 mph in top gear in the highest degree of smoothness and quietness" said The Autocar ". . . fortunate beings will leisurely survey the moving surface of the earth through the windows of their Daimler Double-Sixes as they pass onward in silent dignity".

A letter from Tony Bird in the January 1967 issue of Motor Sport recounted how Double-Six models could develop violent front axle "wheel wobble" which could only be overcome by stopping the car.

== Bodies ==
Bodies were all mounted after the Daimler pattern on a separate frame flexibly held.

A contemporary press report remarked that "when the Double-Six arrives at the door there is no obvious pomp and circumstance. Here is a car that looks clean-cut and aristocratic in its speckless grey paintwork. It is not until one comes close to the car that its great size is realised. The Daimler bonnet is nearly level with the chin of the observer." Autocar

== Difficulties ==
William Boddy of Motor Sport commented that the difficulty with sleeve valves was lubrication. So much oil near the combustion chambers led to a gummy engine prone to seize if left standing for any length of time. Attempts to tow-start invariably led to sleeve-driving link breakage if not damage to the sleeves. There was also difficulty in timing the sleeves once pistons had been out of the block and also synchronising carburation and ignition between the two banks of cylinders.

Daimler introduced their new Straight-Eight in 1934 and Double-Sixes slipped slowly from the catalogue.

== Sources ==
- Boddy, William (1966). The Daimler Double-Sixes. Leatherhead, Surrey: Profile Publications.
- Douglas-Scott-Montagu, Edward John Barrington & Burgess-Wise, David (1995). Daimler Century: The full history of Britain's oldest car maker. Sparkford, Nr Yeovil, Somerset, UK: Patrick Stephens. ISBN 1-85260-494-8.
- Smith, Brian E. (1972). The Daimler Tradition. Isleworth, UK: Transport Bookman. ISBN 0851840043.
