= Clayton Wagons =

Clayton Wagons Ltd.
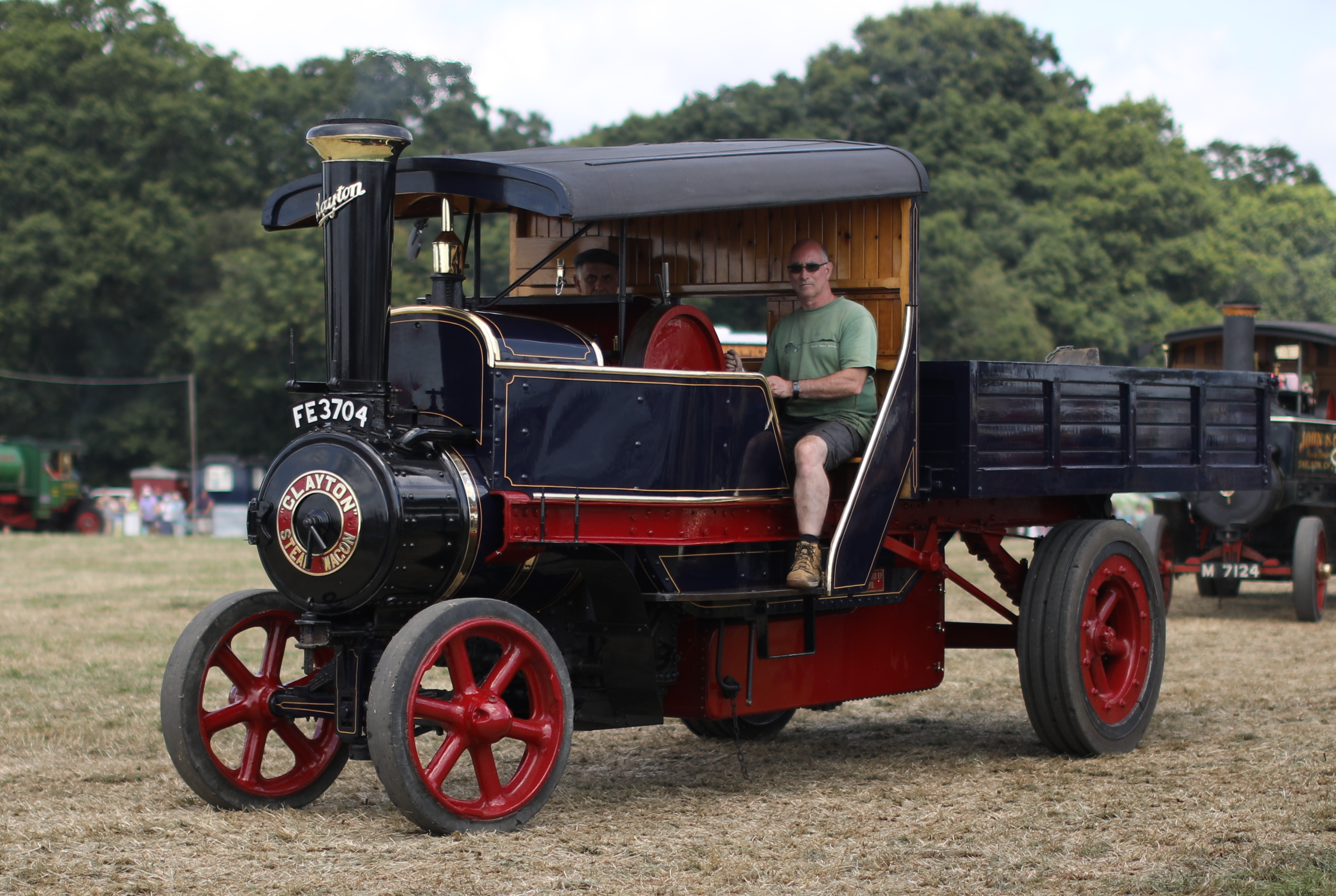
- Clayton and Shuttleworth overtype steam wagon 1920
- Industry: Engineering
- Founded: 1920; 106 years ago
- Defunct: 1930; 96 years ago
- Successor: Smith-Clayton Forge Ltd. and Clayton Dewandre
- Headquarters: Abbey Works/Titanic Works/Clayton Forge, Lincoln
- Key people
- Products: Drop forging, Steam Wagons, Electric Vehicles, Railway Carriages and Rolling stock.
- Parent: Clayton & Shuttleworth

Clayton Wagons Ltd. of Lincoln were formed as a subsidiary company of Clayton & Shuttleworth in 1920. The company occupied the Abbey Works, Titanic Works and Clayton Forge. The company produced drop forgings, Steam Wagons, Electric Vehicles, Railway Carriages and Rolling stock. The main company, Clayton Shuttleworth, which was producing agricultural machinery, continued to operate from the Stamp End Works. Both companies found it very difficult to adapt to the post war economic situation and by 1923 Clayton and Shuttleworth's Eastern European trade had shrunk to 6% of its pre-War level. The firms struggled during the Great Depression and ceased trading on 18 February 1930. The Clayton Wagons premises came to be occupied by Clayton-Dewandre Ltd. and Smith-Clayton Forge Ltd.

== Company history ==
Clayton and Shuttleworth had started manufacturing Steam Motor Wagons in 1912. In 1917 during the 1st World War the Abbey Works and Clayton Forge were built, primarily military production. This included railway wagons for railways in Britain and for the military railways in France. After the war, Philip Warwick Robson, the chairman of Clayton and Shuttleworth, oversaw the reorganisation of the firm, and the new company Clayton Wagons Ltd was created. A prospectus for the new company was issued in April 1920 and one million pounds in shares, split between preference shares and ordinary shares, were issued. The new company was to take over the Titanic Works, Abbey Works and Clayton Forge to carry on the business of the manufacturers of Steam Motor Wagons and other Transport Vehicles, Railway Rolling Stock, Forgings and Drop forgings. Shareholders were promised that the turnover would be £1.5 million a year and the buildings and equipment, which had been largely purchased with Government funding during the war, was valued at £696,000, and was of the most modern type. It was noted that the sale of steam motor vehicles was likely to be very successful and that over 1,000 had been manufactured since 1912 and that Abbey Works was already equipped for railway carriage and rolling stock production, for which there was a worldwide demand. Orders had already been received from the Pullman Car Company.

At first trading results were encouraging and the first year’s trading showed a profit of over £90,000. The second year was not so successful, but there were further orders for Pullman Cars, The report and balance-sheet showed a trading profit for the year of 48,909, but £39,725 had been written off stocks, and a loss of £417,831 had to be carried forward, no dividends being declared on either Preference or Ordinary share capital. Mr. P. W. Robson, the Chairman of the Company, in moving the adoption of the report, said that in spite of the unsatisfactory effect of the year's workings, he had no reason to alter the view he expressed last year that, under anything approaching normal conditions, the results justified the fullest confidence in the Company. It had to be recognised that the industrial crisis had gone from bad to worse in most branches of engineering, and especially in the heavy trades.

In October 1925 the capitalisation of Clayton Wagons had been written down to half a million pounds and no dividends had been paid on the shares. The production of Albert Dewandre servo brakes had commenced in the Titanic works and were being used in Daimler and other motor cars. Trade seemed to be picking up. In September 1926 the Sheffield Daily Telegraph stated that the report of Clayton Wagons, Ltd., is on the whole very satisfactory, especially in view of the past experience of the company. The fact that profit of over £20,700 was made, compared with £728 in 1925, is clear proof that with normal conditions existing in the industrial field, further progress is assured. Indeed, as the directors state, up to the last two months of the financial year ending in June, there was marked improvement, and but for the strike period the profit would undoubtedly have been better still. However, the Company’s trade did not pick up and a group of petitioners applied for the voluntary liquidation at the Companies Winding-up Court, but this was dismissed. It was then granted on 18 February 1930.

== Railway rolling stock ==
Rolling stock included goods wagons and some of these were exported, and these included a “large number” of covered four wheel wagons for the Madras and Southern Mahratta Railway in Southern India. Clayton wagons were also building oil tank wagons for Shell-Mex & BP and tank wagons were also exported for use by the Egyptian National Railways and South African Railways.

=== Pullman coaches ===
Three of the Pullman coaches which were manufactured for the London, Brighton & South Coast Railway in 1922 still survive and two of these are under restoration at the Ravenglass & Eskdale Railway.

== Steam wagons ==
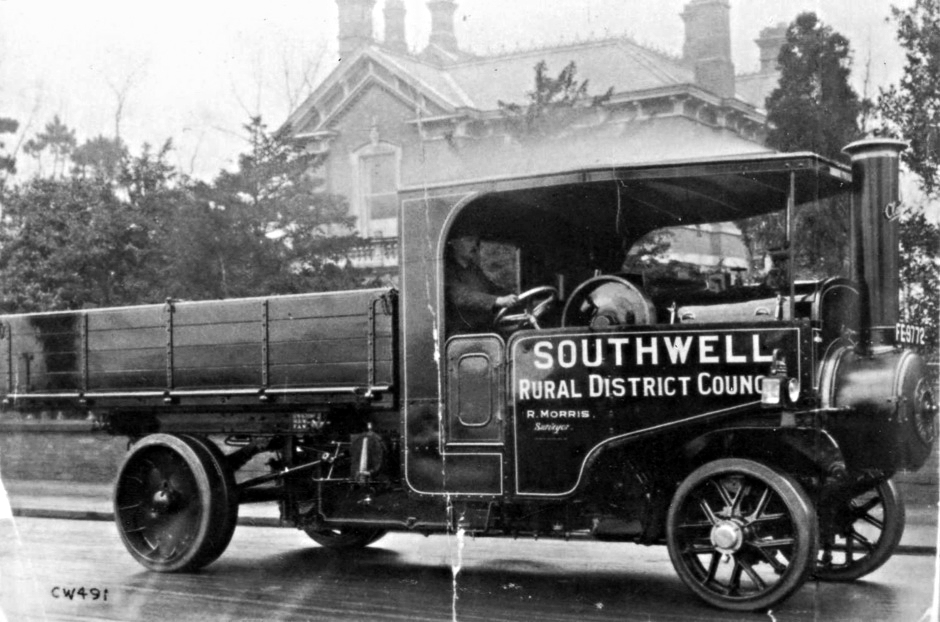
Clayton and Shuttleworth overtype steam wagon.

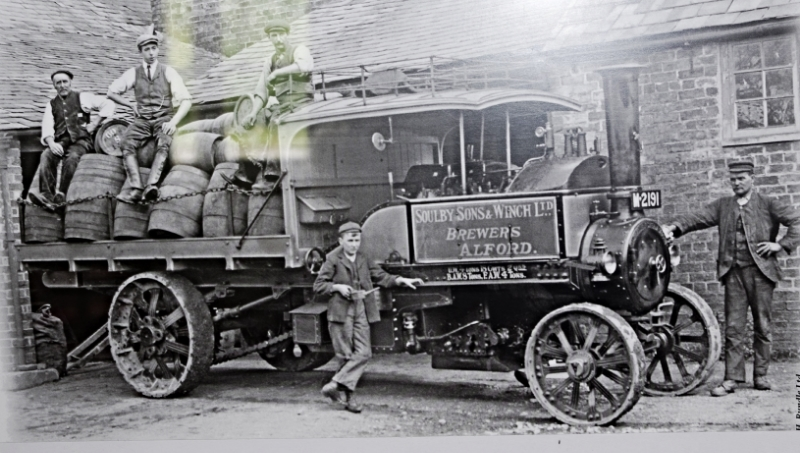
Clayton & Shuttleworth Soulby Sons and Winch.Brewers of Alford.

=== Clayton Dewandre ===
A new company, Clayton Dewandre (motor engineers and servo-brake manufacturers) was formed on 30 September 1928. The company took over the motor engineering business of Clayton Wagons in the Titanic Works, together with certain plant of Clayton & Shuttleworth. The first Company report was issued in December 1929 and showed a profit of £16,694. The success and profitability of the business rose rapidly and by the 8th company report in 1937 an 8% dividend was being paid on the shares.

== Later History ==
Clayton Wagons ceased trading on 18 February 1930. Clayton Forge had been sold to Smith-Clayton Forge Ltd. and that company also purchased the Abbey works in 1935. Smith-Clayton Forge were to specialise in drop forging for the aircraft engines and the motor trade. Richard Duckering Ltd. of the Waterside Works, Lincoln then undertook to supply spares for railcars and shunting locomotives, but this was to pass to Stanley Reid Devlin, who had been Chief Draughtsman at Clayton Wagons, who in 1931 founded the Clayton Equipment Company, who still operate from the Centrum Business Park in Burton upon Trent.

== Literature ==
- Muir A (1958) 75 Years: A Record of Progress, Smiths Stamping Works, Coventry and Smith Clayton Forge, Lincoln. Ribble Works, Coventry.
- Ruddock J.G. and Pearson R.E.(1989) Clayton Wagons Ltd.: Manufacturers of Railway Carriages and Wagons 1920-30 Ruddock, Lincoln
