= Buesst =

Buesst is a surname. Notable people with the surname include:

- Aylmer Buesst (1883–1970), Australian-British conductor, teacher and scholar
- Miles Buesst (born c. 1980), former captain of the Peru national cricket team
- Nigel Buesst (1938–2024), Australian filmmaker
