= Cantata profana =

Work by Béla Bartók

- A kilenc csodaszarvas
- Cantata by Béla Bartók
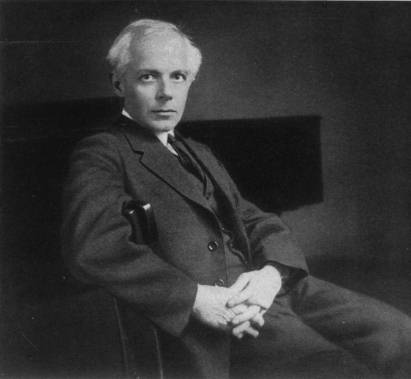
- The composer and librettist in 1927
- English: Secular Cantata: The Nine Enchanted Stags
- Catalogue: Sz 94
- Text: Bartók
- Language: Hungarian
- Based on: Two Romanian colinde
- Composed: 1930
- Duration: About 19 minutes
- Movements: Three
- Scoring: Tenor; Baritone; Double choir; Orchestra

Premiere
- Date: 25 May 1934
- Location: London
- Conductor: Aylmer Buesst
- Performers: BBC Symphony Orchestra and Wireless Chorus

Cantata profana (subtitled A kilenc csodaszarvas [The Nine Enchanted Stags], Sz. 94) is a work for tenor, baritone, double mixed chorus and orchestra by the Hungarian composer Béla Bartók. Completed on 8 September 1930, it was premiered in London (in an English translation by M. D. Calvocoressi) on 25 May 1934 by the BBC Symphony Orchestra and Wireless Chorus, conducted by Aylmer Buesst; tenor Trefor Jones and baritone Frank Phillips were the featured soloists.

== Text ==
The source texts which Bartók used to create the libretto were two Romanian colinde that he collected from Transylvania in April 1914. Colinde are ballads which are sung during the Christmas season, although many colinde have no connection to the nativity of Jesus and are believed to have pre-Christian origins.

The story concerns a father who has taught his nine sons only how to hunt; they know nothing of work and spend all of their time in the forest. One day, while hunting a large and beautiful stag, they cross a haunted bridge and are themselves transformed into stags. The father takes his rifle and goes out in search of his missing sons. Finding the stags gathered around a spring, he drops to one knee and takes aim. The largest stag, his eldest son, pleads with his father not to shoot; the father, recognizing his son in the stag, begs them to come home. The stag then replies that they can never come home, as their antlers cannot pass through doorways and they can no longer drink from cups. In an English translation created much later, Bartók retains the six-syllable versification of the original Romanian text. Below is his translation of the text from the third movement:

Once upon a time there
Was an aged man, he
Had nine handsome boys.
Never has he taught them
Any handicraft, he
Taught them only how to
Hunt in forests dark.
There they roamed, hunted
All the year around, and
Changed into stags in
Forests dark and wild.
Never will their antlers
Enter gates and doors, but
Only woods and shrubs;
Never will their bodies
Wear a shirt and coat but
Only foliage;
Nevermore their feet will
Walk on houses' floors but
Only in the sward;
Nevermore their mouth will
Drink from cups and jugs but
From the clearest springs.

Bartók translated the original Romanian into Hungarian and entrusted a German translation to Bence Szabolcsi. In 1955, Robert Shaw created a new English translation. The original Romanian text has not appeared in any of the published versions of Cantata profana.

== Music ==
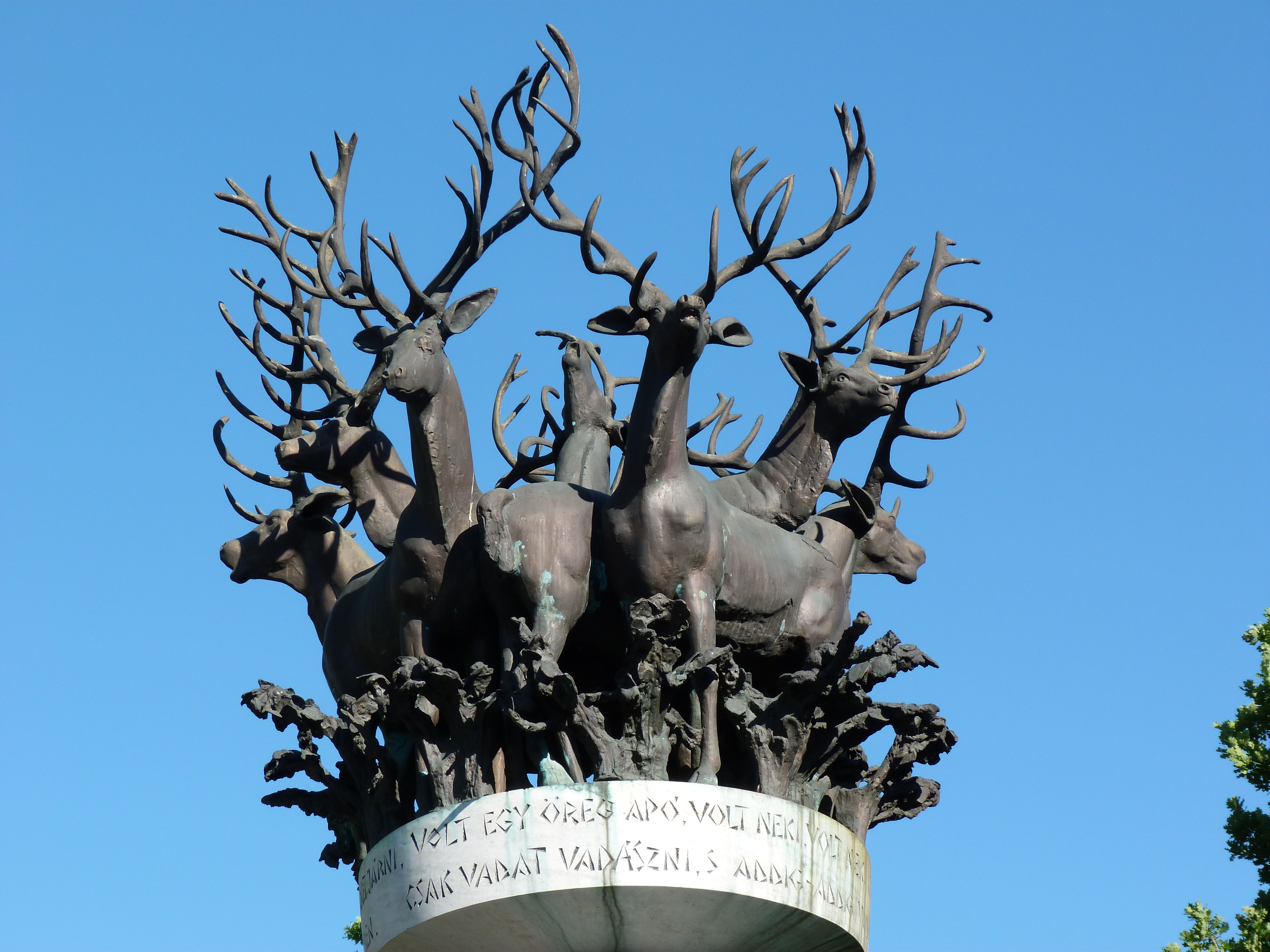
Statue by László Marton depicting the nine stags

Cantata profana is divided into three continuous movements: the first movement describes the hunt and the magic transformation, the second recounts the father's search for his sons and his encounter with them, and the third recapitulates the narrative. The overall A–B–A′ structure exemplifies Bartók's use of arch form.

=== First movement ===
The work opens with an ascending non-diatonic scale: D-E-F-G-A♭-B♭-C. This scale firmly establishes the tonal center of D and provides the framework for much of the melodic content of the Cantata. The opening gesture is immediately followed by a paraphrase of the first two bars of Bach's St Matthew Passion. Bartók offers no explanation of why he chose to include this quotation in what is otherwise a secular work, although some theorists believe that the piece is modeled on the Passion. The choirs enter a few measures later, gradually building larger and larger diatonic clusters, until the first true melody appears as if out of a mist. Two choirs sing of the nine sons knowing of nothing but the hunt.

The B section of the first movement, marked Allegro molto, is a fugue describing the hunt. Drums and horn calls punctuate the music through this section, while the chorus describes the hunters wandering farther and farther into the forest.

The final section of the first movement begins as the hunt music dies down; the mood suddenly becomes quiet and mysterious as the hunters reach the haunted bridge and are then transformed.

=== Second movement ===
The first section of the second movement recounts the father's search for his sons. A variant of the fugue subject, now Andante, provides the melodic material for the chorus to narrate the father's trek to the haunted bridge. As the father sees nine fine stags at a spring, he takes aim with his rifle. The music becomes more and more agitated until the largest stag calls out. Here begins the tenor solo, which is the voice of the stag imploring the father not to take aim at his children, lest they should have to kill him. In the manner of a Greek chorus, the chorus interjects the father's recognition of his sons.

The baritone solo then begins as the father pleads with his sons to come home. "Everything is ready," he says, "the lanterns are lit, the table is set, the cups are filled and your mother grieves". Here again the chorus prepares the stag's reply: "we can never return, our antlers cannot pass through doorways, only roam the forest groves". "Never can they go." is chanted by the chorus as the music grows ever softer and the second movement quietly draws to a close.

=== Third movement ===
The work concludes with the two choirs recapitulating the narrative. As the chorus finishes its retelling of the story, the tenor returns with an impassioned flourish on the words, "from cool mountain springs". The work ends as it began, with an ascending scale, but this time in an inverted form of the opening scale.

== Interpretation ==
Bartók once confided to Bence Szabolcsi that the Cantata profana was "his most profound credo". This has engendered much discussion of possible interpretations of the piece. It has been suggested that the Cantata is an expression of Bartók's humanistic ideal of a brotherhood of all people and nations and ultimately of individual freedom, possibly in response to the Great Depression or the rise of fascism in Europe. On the surface, the story is a simple parable, a morality tale about the consequences of not teaching one's children their proper place in society, or as a story of generational conflict. The transformation of the sons into stags may also be viewed as a rite of passage: ritual death followed by transfiguration, leading to a new life in a "pure" and natural state of being.

The theme of the piece is the inspiration for the film Cantata by Miklós Jancsó.
