= Clayton & Shuttleworth =

British engineering company

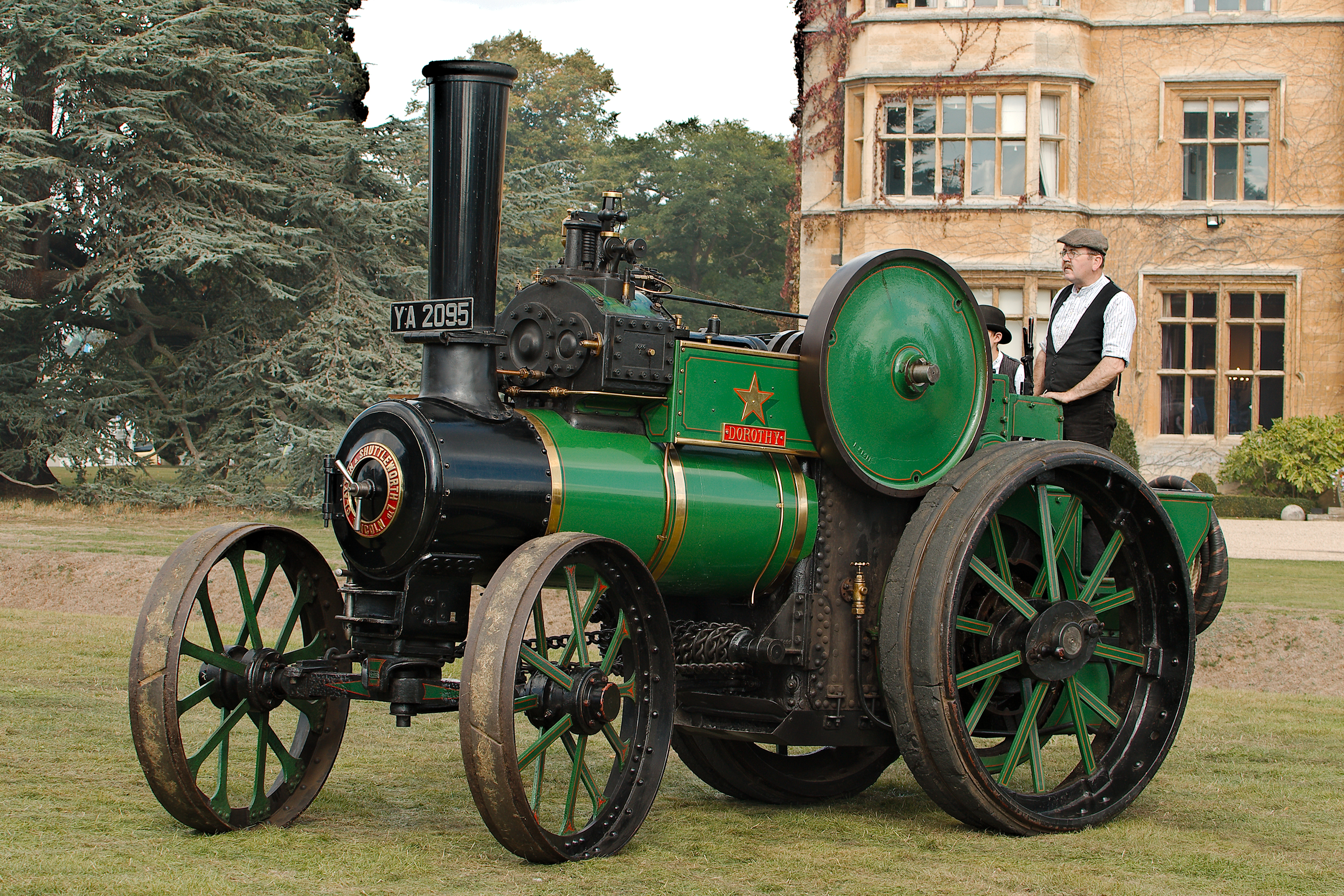
- Clayton & Shuttleworth traction engine
- Founded: 1842; 184 years ago in Lincoln, England
- Founders: Nathaniel Clayton; Joseph Shuttleworth
- Defunct: 1929
- Fate: Failed
- Successors: Marshall, Sons & Co.; Smith-Clayton Forge Ltd.
- Products: Traction Engines; Tractors; Combine Harvesters; Airplanes

Clayton & Shuttleworth was an engineering company located at Stamp End Works, Lincoln, Lincolnshire, England. The company was established in 1842 when Nathaniel Clayton (1811–1890) formed a partnership with his brother-in-law, Joseph Shuttleworth (1819–83).

== History ==
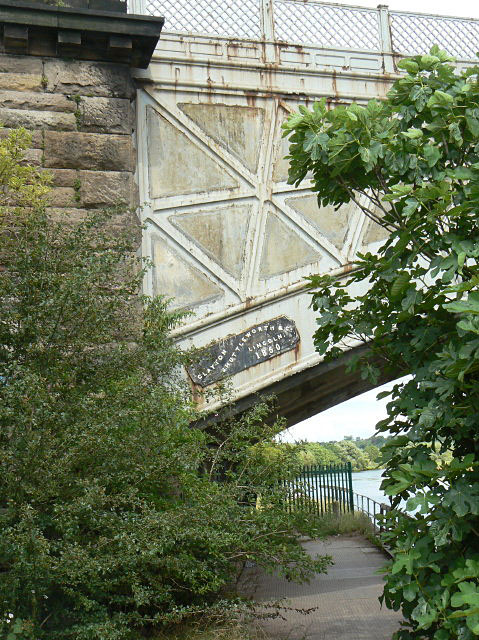
Clayton & Shuttleworth 1850 maker's plate on the Rectory Junction Viaduct near Netherfield, Nottinghamshire

=== Steam engines ===
The company began building portable steam engines in 1845, and added threshing machines to their range in 1849. These agricultural products formed the core of the business, and resulted in Clayton & Shuttleworth becoming one of the leading manufacturers of such products. Many were sold under their own name, but they also supplied steam engines and threshing machines to other manufacturers. They produced over 200 steam engines in 1851, with buoyant sales as a result of the Great Exhibition. Output continued to increase, and by 1857 they had manufactured some 2,400 steam engines, with total output reaching 26,000 steam engines and 24,000 threshing machines by 1890. In 1858 Thomas Aveling adapted a Clayton & Shuttleworth engine to become self propelled and followed this up by designing a purpose built traction engine which was manufactured by Clayton & Shuttleworth who finished in time for the 1860 Royal Agricultural Society of England show. Clayton & Shuttleworth were to build a further 18 engines to Aveling's design stopping in 1861 when Aveling opened his own works.

In 1905, they exhibited lightweight traction engines at the Royal Show. These were known as tractors, as were similar machines exhibited by Aveling and Porter and nearby competitors Ruston, Proctor of Lincoln. The lightweight construction enabled them to be classified as "heavy motorcars" under the legislation of the time. By 1908, they had improved their designs by including a mechanical lubrication system, replacing the need for the driver to stop the machine to oil the moving parts at regular intervals.

33 of the company's traction engines survived into preservation along with 11 steam rollers and 3 steam wagons. 19 portable engines have also survived.

=== Exports ===
By 1870 the company was employing 1,200 people at their Lincoln base. Many of their products were shipped overseas, and they opened several foreign branches in order to facilitate this. The first was in Vienna (Austria), and other branches followed in Pest (Hungary), Prague (now the Czech Republic), Kraków (now Poland) and Lemberg (now Ukraine). The administrative structure changed in 1901, when the firm became a limited company, with Alfred Shuttleworth (1843–1925), son of the founder, becoming the chairman.

=== Internal combustion engines ===
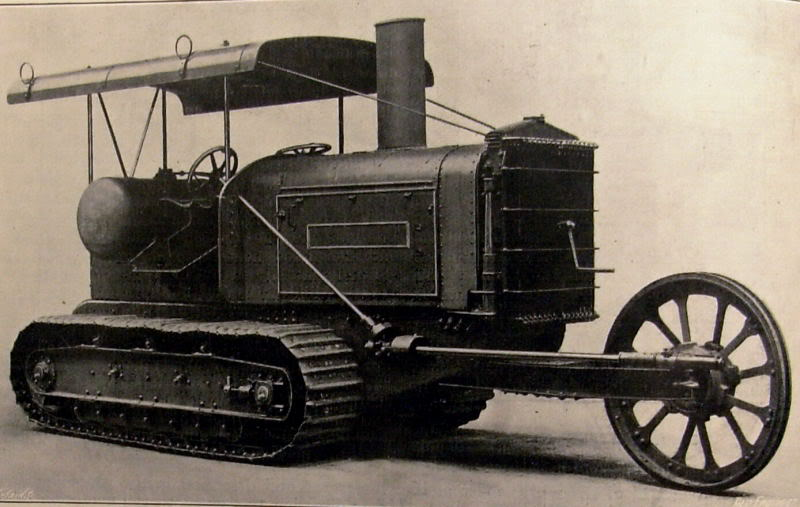
1916 Clayton & Shuttleworth tractor

For a short time in the 20th century Clayton & Shuttleworth made tractors. In 1911 they built a four-cylinder oil engine with car-type radiator, sheet-metal bonnet and cab roof. A tractor with an oil engine, magneto ignition and mechanical lubrication was exhibited at the Royal Show at Norwich in that year. It came with a speed governor, allowing it to be used for powering threshing machines, dynamos and pumps. They also displayed a tractor which had been designed for the South American and Canadian markets, and could use either oil or petrol as its fuel. By 1913, they had produced a valveless semi-diesel engine, where the movement of the piston controlled the admission of air to the cylinders and the discharging of exhaust gases. Four machines with this engine fitted were exhibited at the Royal Show, held on Durdham Down in Bristol. This was followed in 1916 by a four-cylinder gas-kerosene engine crawler tractor ("Chain Rail"). Interest in track-laying vehicles had been sparked by the success of tanks in the First World War. The vehicles were fitted with Dorman 6.3 litre engines, initially marketed as 35 horsepower (26 kW) but subsequently becoming 40 horsepower (30 kW). The machine was steered by a conventional steering wheel, which controlled large cone clutches to connect the drive to the tracks on either side, but sharper turns could be made by using a footbrake to stop either of the tracks independently. The tractor was produced until the mid-1920s, and again briefly in 1928, but production ceased when the company was taken over by Marshall & Sons. The company also built a 100 hp (75 kW) gun tractor, similar to a Holt tractor. Clayton and Shuttleworth were the first British company to make a combine harvester.

=== Aircraft ===
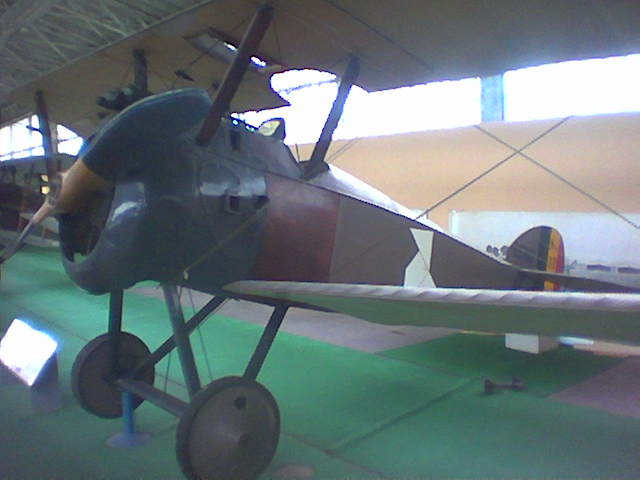
A Clayton & Shuttleworth-built Sopwith Camel on display at the Musée Royal de l'Armée et de l'Histoire Militaire in Belgium

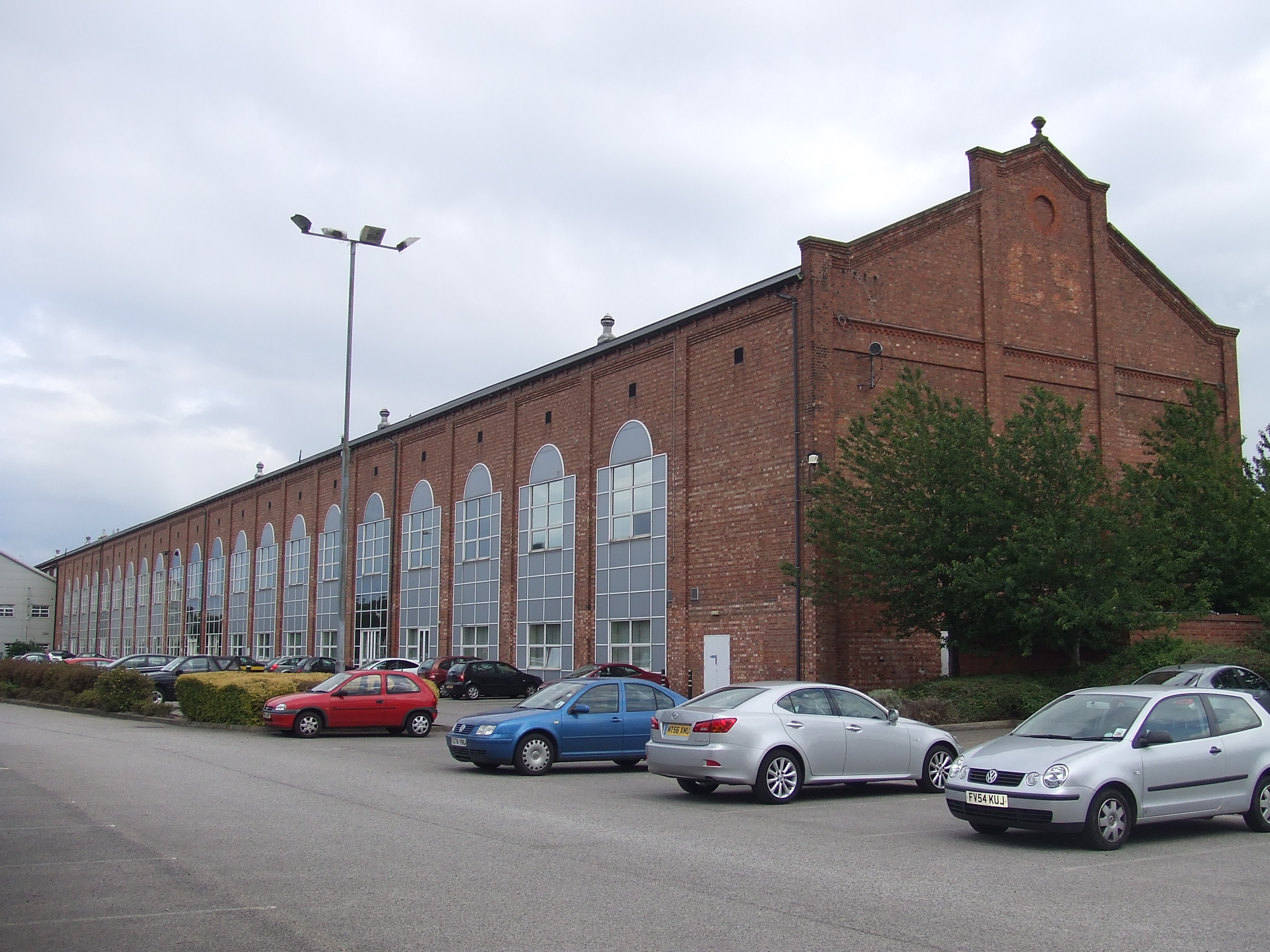
Clayton and Shuttleworth Titanic Works, Lincoln. The Factory where the Sopwith Camels were built.

In 1916 the company made parts for the Supermarine Scout airship for the Admiralty, and during the First World War it won a number of contracts to build aircraft for both the War Office and the Admiralty. The first contract was to build the Sopwith Triplane; although the War Office later cancelled their contract, 49 were built for the Royal Naval Air Service, with the first Clayton-built aircraft delivered on 2 December 1916. The company built the aircraft in the eastern end of the Titanic Works, from where they were pushed outside for engine runs. Following ground tests the aircraft were dismantled and taken to Robey's Aerodrome at Bracebridge Heath for test flying and delivery.

In March 1917 the company received a contract to build the Sopwith Camel, and this remained in production until 1919, by which time more than 500 aircraft had been constructed. In 1916 a new works was built to enable the company to produce the large Handley Page O/400 bomber. When completed, the aircraft – unlike the smaller Sopwith aircraft – were flown out for testing and delivery from a field to the east of the works; the field became known as Handley Page Field. After completion of the O/400 contract an order was received to build the Vickers Vimy, but only one was constructed before the Armistice and the contract was cancelled.

==== Red Baron; Richard Shuttleworth ====
One of the most notable aircraft built by Clayton & Shuttleworth was Sopwith Camel B7270, flown by Canadian pilot Roy Brown, and officially credited with shooting down the Red Baron Manfred von Richthofen. The company issued a souvenir leaflet after the war to celebrate the success. Modern research indicates, however, that Brown may not in fact have fired the fatal shot.

Richard Ormonde Shuttleworth, the grandson of Joseph Shuttleworth, co-founder of the company, was a noted racing motorist, aviator and collector of cars and aircraft. Cars and aircraft acquired by him formed the basis of what is now known as the Shuttleworth Collection. An officer in the Royal Air Force Volunteer Reserve (RAFVR), he was killed in a night flying accident in World War II.

== Closure ==
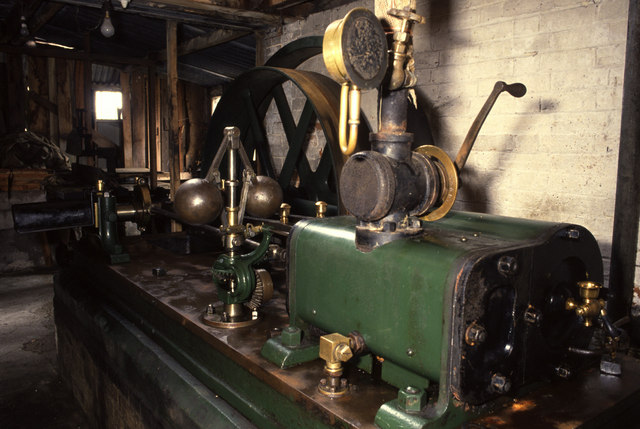
1863 Clayton & Shuttleworth horizontal steam engine, installed at a sawmill at Englefield, Berkshire since 1900

The company failed in 1929, and were taken over by Marshall, Sons & Co. of Gainsborough, for its combine harvester technology. Clayton Forge and the Abbey Works on Spa Road, Lincoln were purchased by Smith's Castings of Coventry in 1929 and became Smith-Clayton Forge Ltd. The Austrian, Hungarian and Romanian branches had been merged into the Hofherr-Schrantz Machine Factory in 1911 creating Hofherr-Schrantz-Clayton-Shuttleworth AG. The company survived the Great Depression in Hungary and the Second World War. After the war the Soviet Red Army occupied Hungary, and the newly formed Communist government started nationalising the industry. The factory became state property in 1948 and was renamed to Vörös Csillag Traktorgyár (Red Star Tractor Factory) in 1951. Its independent operation ceased in 1973 when it was attached to Rába. The factory was finally closed in 2010, but many of the hundred-year-old buildings are still in use by smaller companies.

== Literature ==
- Archives Hub. "Clayton and Shuttleworth Ltd 1840's - 1932". Documents at Museum of English Rural Life. GB 7 TR 3MAR.
- Baldwin, Nick (1998). Classic Tractors of the World. Voyageur Press. ISBN 978-0-89658-394-8.
- Birch N. (2002/3) Clayton Shuttleworth and Co.- early successes and a strike. Lincolnshire Past and Present, no.50, pp. 3–6.
- Moore N (2019), Pictures from Budapest: Who were Hofherr-Schrantz-Clayton-Shuttleworth?, Lincolnshire Past and Present, No.115, Spring 2019, pp. 3–8.
- Ruddock J.G. and Pearson R.E.(1989) Clayton Wagons Ltd.: Manufacturers of Railway Carriages and Wagons 1920-30 Ruddock, Lincoln
- Walls, John (1977). Clayton & Shuttleworth and Marshall Aircraft Production. Lincoln: Control Column.
- Wheeler R.C.(2012) The Rise of Clayton and Shuttleworth, Lincolnshire History and Archaeology, Vol.47, pp. 61–71.
- Williams, Michael (2007). Classic Farm Tractors. Bounty Books. ISBN 978-0-7537-1446-1.
