= Hofherr-Schrantz-Clayton-Shuttleworth AG =

Austrian manufacturer of agricultural machinery

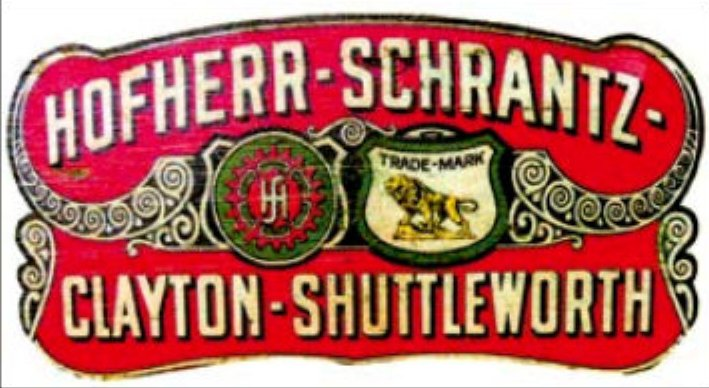
- Type: Joint-stock company
- Industry: Agricultural engineering
- Founded: 1842 Clayton & Shuttleworth 1869/1881 Hofherr-Schrantz
- Defunct: 1938/1946
- Fate: Appropriated by Heinrich Lanz AG at the time of the Anschluss in Austria and in 1946 by communist nationalisation in Hungary
- Successor: Heinrich Lanz AG
- Headquarters: Vienna, Budapest, Prague, Kraków, Lviv, Timișoara and Craiova
- Products: Portable steam engines, Threshing machines, Traction Engines, Tractors, Seed drills
- Parent: Clayton & Shuttleworth and Hofherr Schrantz.

Hofherr Schrantz : Clayton Shuttleworth or HSCS was an agricultural machinery company. It was formed by the merger of two Austro-Hungarian agricultural engineering businesses in 1911. A new joint stock company was formed with headquarters in Vienna and Budapest. Clayton & Shuttleworth which had been founded in Lincoln, Lincolnshire in 1842 and had established themselves in Vienna in 1857 and later in Budapest continued its independent operations outside Austria, Hungary and Romania.

== Vienna in 1869 ==
Mathias Hofherr started an agricultural machinery factory in Vienna in 1869 and a further factory in Budapest. In 1881, the Hungarian-born János Schrantz joined the company as a capital partner. Both companies had expanded considerably and Clayton and Shuttleworth had opened a further five assembly plants and factories in Austria-Hungary and in the newly established kingdom of Romania.

== First factory ==
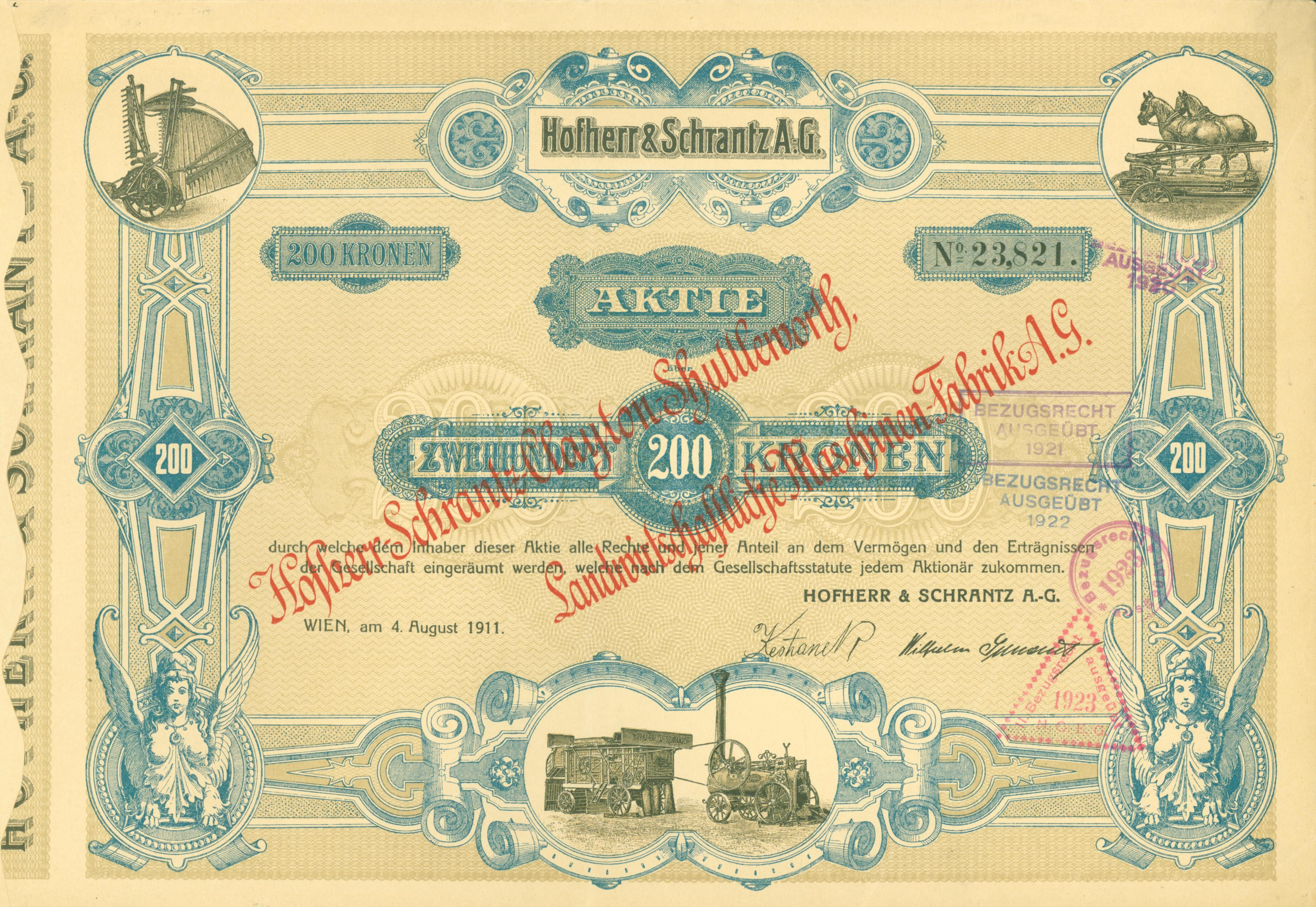
Share of the Hofherr-Schrantz-Clayton Shuttleworth Landwirtschaftliche Maschinen-Fabrik AG, issued 4 August 1911

Clayton and Shuttleworth's first factory in Vienna was built in Wien-Landstraße in 1860, but in 1905 the company relocated the factory to Floridsdorf. Following this a new company was formed in 1911 by combining all the Hofherr Schrantz and Clayton Shuttleworth factories in Austro-Hungary and Romania. The Vienna factory of Hofherr Schrantz which operated from 92 Erlachgasse in Favoriten (Vienna X) was closed as was also the Clayton Shuttleworth offices at 33 Lowengasse in Vienna III.

== Expansion ==
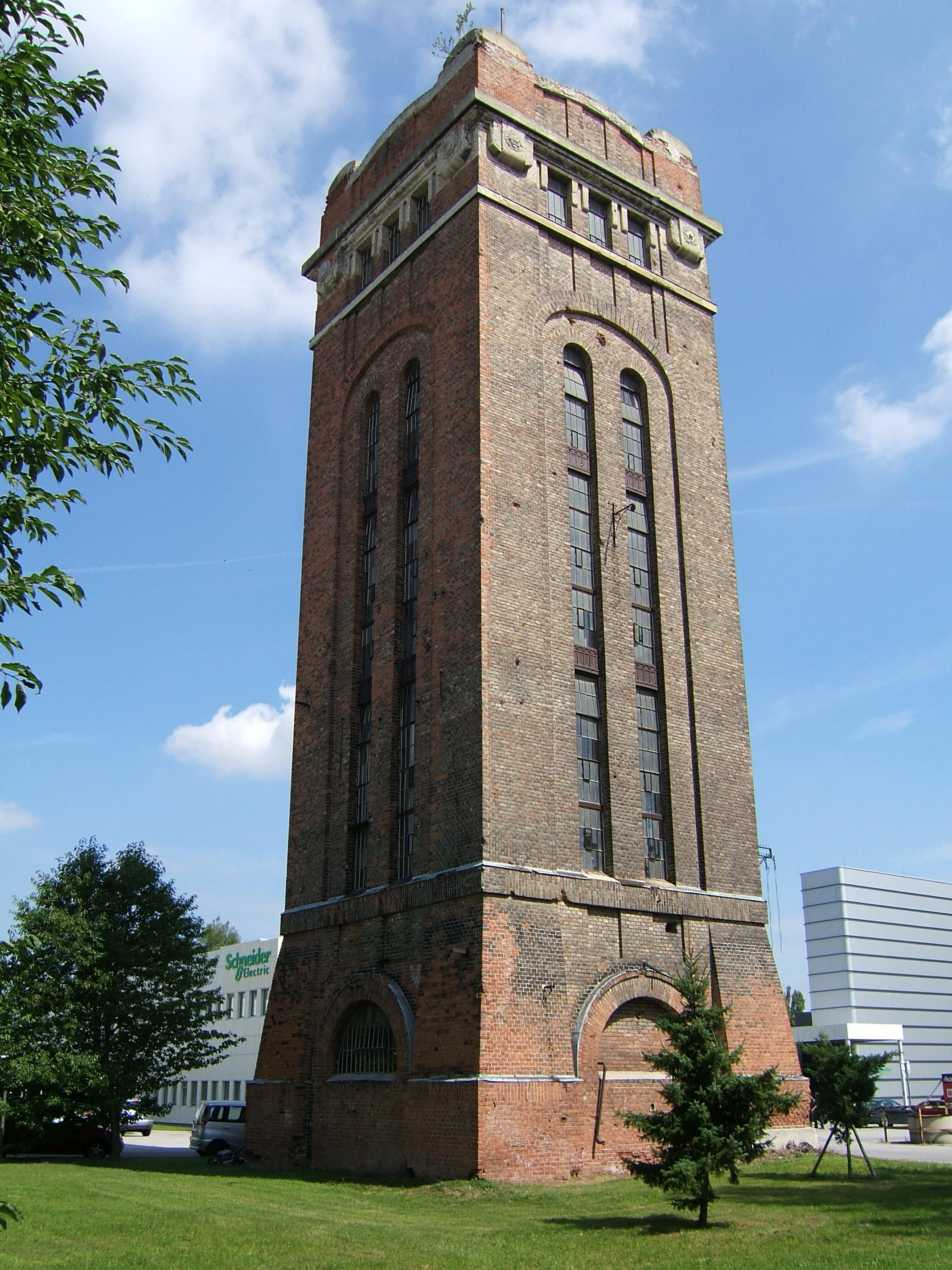
Factory Watertower on the Floridsdorf site

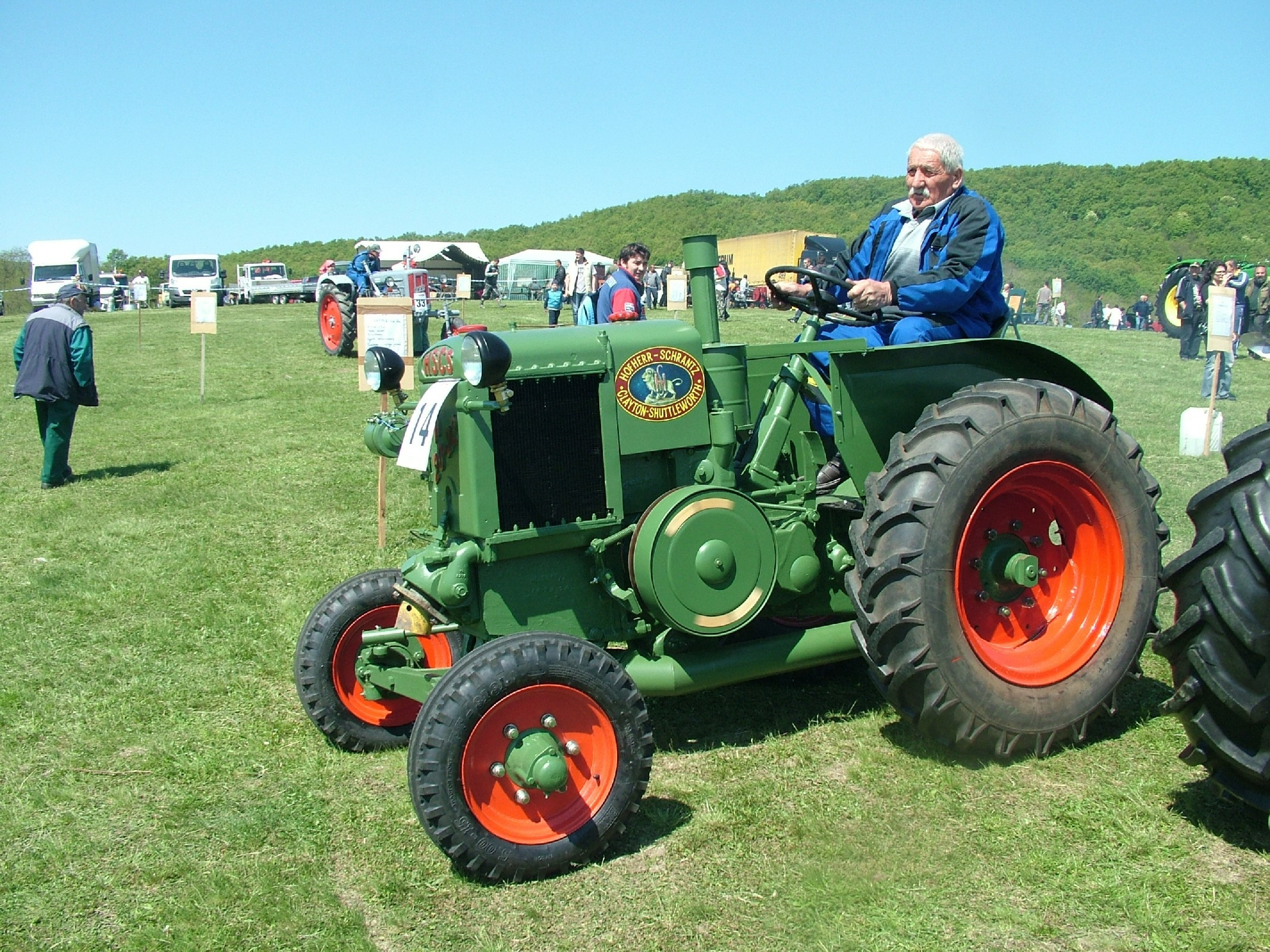
HSCS Tractor RB series c1935

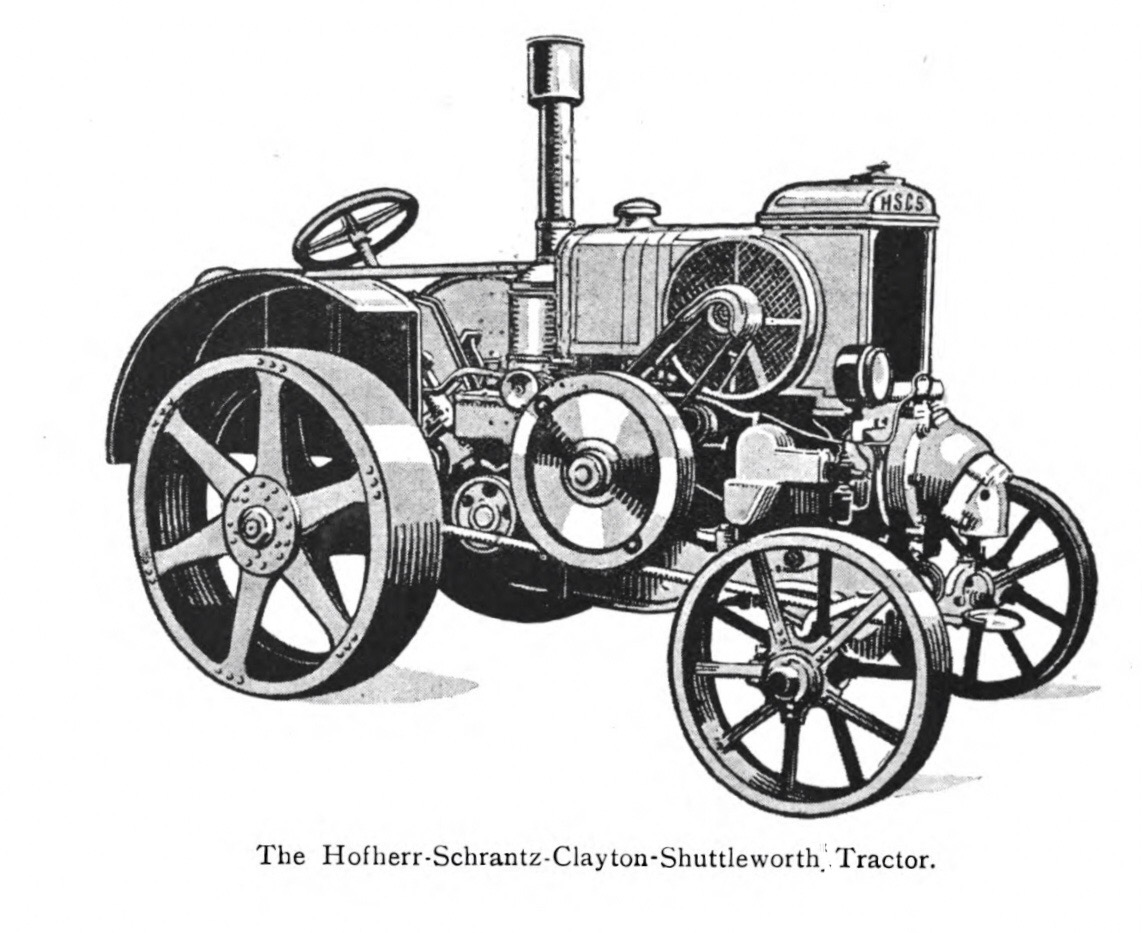
Hofherr-Schrantz 20-30

The company continued to expand and after World War I HSCS became the largest tractor manufacturer in eastern Europe. The Vienna factory in Floridsdorf was appropriated in 1938 by Heinrich Lanz AG of Mannheim at the time of the Anschluss in Austria. During World War II the factory was used by the Nazis in the production of V2 rockets. From 1950, the number of employees decreased steadily. The company was merged with Trauzl-Werke AG in Vienna in 1969, and the Floridsdorfer Fabrik was sold to Elin AG in 1968.

== Redevelopment ==
In 1970, the entire company joined Böhlerwerke AG. The factory site at Floridsdorf is currently undergoing redevelopment. The main building has now been refurbished and on 23 November 2017 was opened as Creative Culture Traktorfabrik, a collective venture containing artists studios.

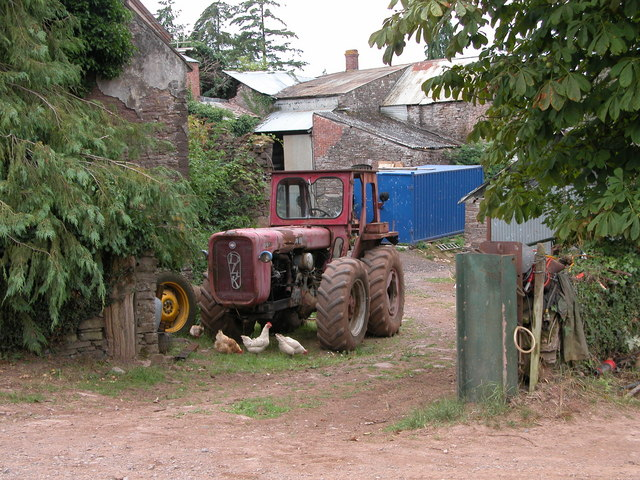
Dutra DK4 tractor at Dan-y-graig, Monmouthshire

The Budapest factory became Hungarian state property in 1948 and was renamed Vörös Csillag Traktorgyár (Red Star Tractor Factory) in 1951. Its independent operation ceased in 1973 when it was attached to Rába. Their products were widely exported and many of the DUTRA ( a contraction of Dumper Truck and TRActor) imported into Britain were fitted with Perkins Engines. The factory was finally closed in 2010, however many of the hundred-year-old buildings are still in use by smaller companies.

== Literature ==
- Brooks R. (Undated, but 1988), Lincolnshire Engines Worldwide, Lincolnshire Life Museum, Lincolnshire County Council. ISBN 086-1111362
- Leopold Weiss (publisher 1898), Die Gross-Industrie Oesterreichs. Festgabe zum glorreichen fünfzigjährigen Regierungs-Jubiläum seiner Majestät des Kaisers Franz Josef I. dargebracht von den Industriellen Oesterreichs 1898, Vol. 3, Wien, pp 42–43.
- Mathis F (1987) Big Business in Österreich. Österreichische Großunternehmen in Kurzdarstellungen, Wien: Verlag für Geschichte und Politik, pp. 152–153.
- Moore N (2019), Pictures from Budapest: Who were Hofherr-Schrantz-Clayton-Shuttleworth?, Lincolnshire Past and Present, No.115, Spring 2019, pp. 3–8.
