= Aylmer Buesst =

Australian conductor (1883 - 1970)

Aylmer Buesst (28 January 1883 – 3 January 1970) was an Australian conductor, teacher and scholar, who spent his career in the United Kingdom. He was mainly associated with opera and vocal music. He also wrote a work on the leitmotifs in Richard Wagner's operas, and he was an authority on heraldry.

== Biography ==
Aylmer Wilhelmy Buesst was born in 1883 in Melbourne, the son of William Augustus Buesst (1846–1935) and Helen Violette Buesst (née Pett). His brothers were Victor Augustine (1885–1960; a composer), and Tristan Noël Marchand (1894–1982; a soldier, barrister and collector of Australiana). The Buesst family had migrated in the 1870s from Staffordshire in England, "buesst" being an Anglo-Saxon word meaning "stout". Nevertheless, his mother later pretended the name was German, and sometimes added an umlaut (Büesst) to make it appear so.

He studied the violin in Melbourne, where he was celebrated as a prodigy. During the 1890s the visiting virtuoso Joseph Joachim noticed him, and took him to Breslau to study with him. He had further studies at the Breslau Conservatory, then with César Thomson in Brussels and August Wilhelmj in London. His music studies continued at the Leipzig Conservatory, including conducting studies with Arthur Nikisch.

He married Vaanda Heiliger in about 1908. They had two daughters, Ysolde and Victorine. In 1911 he was invited to conduct the Hallé Orchestra in Manchester, England. In 1914, at the outbreak of World War I, he was imprisoned in Strangeways Prison as an enemy alien in the belief that he was a German, since he spoke German fluently, had developed a German-sounding English accent from his years of study on the European continent, and had also adopted the umlaut when writing his surname. He enlisted the aid of a friend on the outside, Sir Gerald Woods Wollaston (a future Garter Principal King of Arms 1930–1944) in researching his ancestry, to prove that he was of purely English stock. Wollaston was able to secure his release after ten months. In the process, Wollaston had a grant of arms organised for Buesst. Ironically, due to his excellent German, Buesst (who had quickly dropped the umlaut) was then used in interrogating captured German officers and generally helping with translations throughout the remainder of the war. Despite being cleared of any German sympathies or family connections, he was not required anymore at the Hallé due to the prevailing anti-German sentiment. He returned to Breslau, becoming Kapellmeister there. It was in Breslau that he became interested in heraldry himself, and started what would later become a vast collection of books and other material on European heraldry, including all the coats of arms of the Holy Roman Empire. His library was later donated to help found the collection of the Institute of Heraldic and Genealogical Studies.

Aylmer Buesst conducted the Moody-Manners Opera Company, the D'Oyly Carte Opera Company, then the Beecham Opera Company 1916-17 and 1919–20. He was a co-founder of the British National Opera Company (BNOC), which he conducted 1922–28. He married the soprano May Blyth in 1924, after the death of his first wife in 1921.

His book Richard Wagner's The Nibelung's Ring: An Act By Act Guide to the Plot and Music was published in 1932, and had a second edition in 1952.

In 1933 he was appointed Assistant Music Director for the BBC until 1936. He led the premiere performance of Béla Bartók's Cantata Profana, in a radio broadcast from London on 25 May 1934. He led the Scottish Orchestra 1939–40.

He held teaching posts at the Royal Academy of Music, the Royal College of Music and the Guildhall School of Music. His students included the composers Buxton Orr and Imogen Holst, the conductors George Weldon, Robert Jenner, and Thomas Loten, and the tenor Ian Partridge.

He was President of the St Albans Orchestral Society, and his daughter Jill was a pianist.

He died in January 1970, aged 86.

== Recordings ==
Aylmer Buesst made recordings with Richard Crooks and Heddle Nash.

He made only the third recording of Mascagni's Cavalleria rusticana, with the BNOC in 1927. This was the first complete opera recording ever made in England using the electric process. The principal singers were Heddle Nash, Justine Griffiths, Harold Williams, Buesst's wife May Blyth, and Marjorie Parry (then John Barbirolli's wife). The recording has been released on CD, paired with Eugene Goossens conducting Leoncavallo's Pagliacci. This release has received a number of glowing reviews.

== Sources ==
- Grove's Dictionary of Music and Musicians, ed. Eric Blom, 5th ed, 1954, Vol. I, p. 1003
