= Albert Dewandre =

Albert Barthélemy Franz Marie Joseph Dewandre (20 March 1884, Monceau-sur-Sambre – 25 May 1964, Liège) was a Belgian engineer, inventor and industrialist.

== Family background ==
Albert Dewandre's father Georges (1853–1932) was also an engineer and a member of the AILg (Association des Ingénieurs diplômés de L`Université de Liège), and his mother was Sophie (née Minette) (1855–1924). Albert was the grandson of the Belgian lawyer-politician, Senator Barthel Dewandre (1822–1893).

== Inventions ==
His most notable invention was a brake booster or servo brake that utilizes the low pressure (vacuum) in the intake manifolds of an internal combustion engine. It was commercialized by the German Robert Bosch GmbH, and was first used in the 1926 Horch 8-cylinder automobile, and some Mercedes-Benz truck models in 1927, and in passenger cars the following year.

In 1933, he introduced a front-wheel drive trolleybus, the "trolleybus Dewandre", with both power steering and brakes. After its introduction in 1935, the drawbacks of Dewandre's solution became apparent, as the feel of the steering system was still poor: it was difficult to keep the trolleybus steady in its direction due to the shortcomings of the steering technology used. After further development, vehicles equipped with power steering and brakes, manufactured under the British company Clayton-Dewandre Ltd., nevertheless brought the inventor a handsome income.

In 1938 Dewandre patented a hydraulically and pneumatically controlled automatic gun turret.

Dewandre also designed and built a fountain for the 1939 Expo de l'Eau in Liège. The water jet, which reached a height of one hundred meters, was the tallest of its kind in the world at the time of its construction.

== Awards and honors ==
Albert Dewandre was director of the Compagnie des Pieux Frankl (now Forges de Zeebrugge, part of the Thales Group), vice-president of the Fabrique Nationale de Herstal, administrator of the University of Liège, and president of its graduate engineering society AILg. After the end of World War II, he was also a founding member of the BSMEE Belgian Society of Mechanical and Environmental Engineering, now part of the CEEES (Confederation of European Environmental Engineering Societies) umbrella organisation. He was awarded the rank of Officer of the Legion d'Honneur (Legion of Honor), as well as the rank of Commander of the Ordre de la Couronne, the second highest Belgian order.
