= Vacuum servo =

Car part

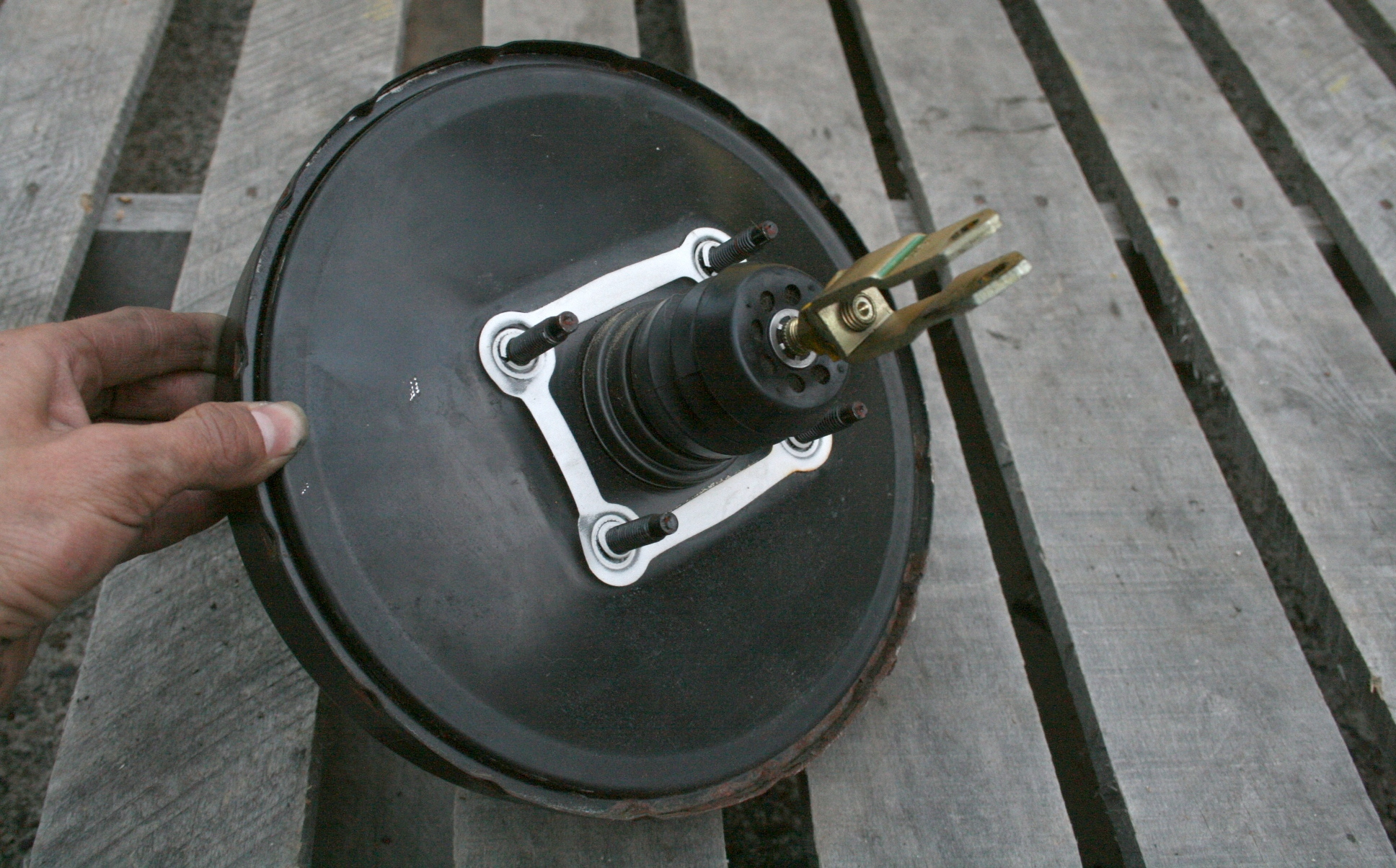
Brake booster from a Geo Storm.

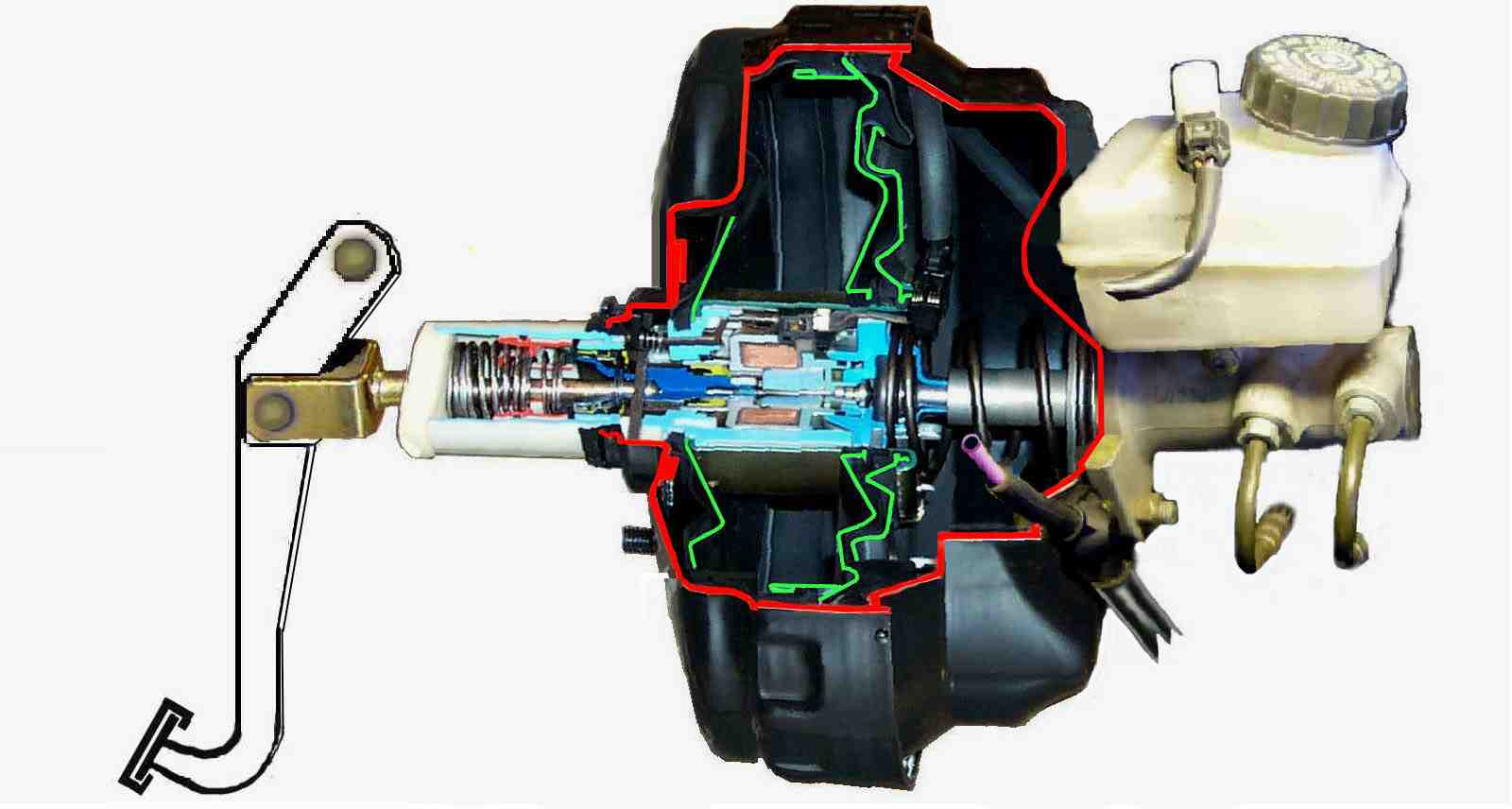
Brake vacuum servo section

A vacuum servo (also called a brake booster, brake servo, power booster, or power brake unit) is a component used on motor vehicles in their braking system, to provide assistance to the driver by decreasing the braking effort. It uses a vacuum, usually supplied by the engine, to multiply the driver's pedal effort and apply that effort to the master cylinder.

Because the servo depends on the vacuum supplied by a running engine, a check valve is typically used in the vacuum line to maintain residual vacuum without engine support, allowing limited use even after parking.

The system was invented by Albert Dewandre who, together variously with Bosch and Clayton-Dewandre Ltd. took out further patents as it was refined.

== See also ==
- List of auto parts
