= Hungarian interwar economy =

Economics of Hungary During the Interwar Period

The Hungarian Interwar Economy was the economy of Hungary in the period between the end of the First World War and the start of the Second World War. It was dominated by the effects of the Treaty of Trianon and the Great Depression. The economy suffered from inflation and reparation payments stipulated by the Treaty of Trianon. The economy of Hungary began to recover after a trade agreement with Germany, which influenced Hungary's joining of the Axis.

== After Trianon ==
Following the Treaty of Trianon on June 4, 1920, Hungary, one of the defeated powers, was reduced to nearly 32.6% of its former size. The treaty established which states would replace the former Kingdom of Hungary, with the most dramatic economic consequences of the dismantling affecting Hungary herself. Before the war Hungary depended upon the Austrian and Czech parts of the empire for the import of up to 80% of Hungary's raw materials and a market accepting an equal percentage of Hungarian exports; the end of the Austro-Hungarian Empire left the new Hungarian State with few raw materials, a loss of its markets, and no sea access, all adding to the devastation of Hungary's destroyed economy.

In 1920/21 the Hungarian budget predicted expenditures twice as high as the estimated revenue for the year. At the same time the country was facing unrestrained inflation so that by December 1920 the Minister of Finance, Lóránt Hegedüs, drafted a financial program striving for general deflation, tax reforms, and reduced budget expenditures. The plan failed for various reasons, including strong political opposition and the reparation payments which made it difficult to create a balanced budget for the country. In 1922, the government, which until that time had done nothing more than establish some export embargoes, finally intervened in an attempt to curtail the rapidly rising inflation. Foreign-exchange regulation was established mainly on imported goods, though these controls were only temporary. By the second half of the 1920s state intervention decreased significantly to allow a more liberal economic policy.

== Economic Stability ==
The Hungarian economy remained susceptible to escalating inflation and was largely disorganized until March 1924 when the League of Nations agreed to the Financial Reconstruction Plan. Under this plan the League would lend Hungary a sum of about 250 million gold crowns in an attempt to help stabilize Hungarian currency and help balance the budget. The budget was finally balanced in 1924/25 followed by a stabilizing of the economy. On 1 January 1927, the government introduced a new currency, the pengő, which equaled 12,500 paper crowns.

== Effects of the Great Depression ==
Despite having been greatly reduced in size following the war, Hungary, due to its agricultural efficiency, still exported more wheat than any other State in Europe at the time . The economy did well from the 1924/25 financial year until 1929/30. When the Great Depression hit in 1929, there was a collapse of world wheat prices Hungary who depended on the export of wheat into a deficit. From July 1930- July 1934, the boletta system was put into place, providing price support and tax relief for farms in an attempt to manage the economic crisis caused by the decline in wheat prices. The National Council for Industry was also established to help regulate the industrial sector of the economy.

Between May 1 and July 13, 1931, the Hungarian National Bank paid out 200 million pengős in gold and foreign exchange. At the same time Hungary's foreign debt reached 4,300 million pengős with interests costing 300 million pengős a year. With the gold and foreign exchange reserves virtually depleted, the gold cover of the pengős fell from 40% to 20%. By the summer of 1931, the National Bank no longer maintained enough foreign exchange to continue making interest payments. The government suspended the redemption of bonds and ended the payment of interest in foreign exchange on long-term foreign debts. In response to the economic crisis Hungary faced, foreign creditors agreed to temporarily suspend debt payments.

== Recovery ==
The deflation policies first enacted in 1929 and 1930 meant to assist the government in rebalancing the budget were finally achieved in 1936/37. On July 7, 1937, The Times reported that Hungary had reached an agreement to pay interest on long-term non-State debts, which had been suspended since 1931 with over 65 loans falling under the terms of this new debt offer. The resumption of payments came after signs of a recovering economy. The revival of the economy was due largely to the controls set on inflation and a bilateral trade agreement signed with Germany in 1934. The agreement gave Hungary a secure market for its wheat exports along with prices which made selling to Germany more advantageous to Hungary than selling the wheat on the world market.

== German Involvement and its Post World War II Consequences ==
The trade treaty Gyula Gömbös signed with Germany in 1934 was an important factor in stimulating the economy, but it also became a critical factor in deciding the fate of Hungary for the remainder of the decade and during the war. Though the agreement did give Hungary a favorable price for sales of her wheat, the money earned remained in an account in Germany and had to be used to purchase German industrial goods. By 1938 the terms of trade agreement provided Germany with economic domination over Hungary, along with most other countries in the region, and left Hungary inextricably tied to Germany for the duration of the interwar period and leading into World War II; Hungary, because of her unbreakable ties to Germany, ultimately joined the war on the side of the Axis powers. When the tides of the war began to turn, Hungary, as in World War I, was again on the losing side. As the allies began to defeat Germany the Red Army began liberating much of Eastern Europe, reaching Hungary in December 1944. The occupation of the Red Army which began in 1944 played a role in preparing Hungary for an eventual communist takeover.
