= Nottingham and Derby Green Belt =

Area protected from development in East Midlands, England

Nottingham & Derby Green Belt. County boundaries District/city council borders Green belt

The Nottingham and Derby Green Belt is a green belt environmental and planning policy for the cities of Derby and Nottingham in the East Midlands region of England. It includes designated parts of several districts in the surrounding counties of Derbyshire and Nottinghamshire. Management is mainly performed by the local planning authority (a district council in many cases) on guidance from central government.

== Purpose ==
The fundamental functions for the belt are to prevent urban sprawl and the merging of the outlying areas surrounding the two cities by restricting development, in order to preserve the countryside; protect the environment from inappropriate urban growth; and maintain the individuality of settlements. While this is an overall definition provided by central government, local councils then refine the extents and can review these as required.

The belt avoids major areas of population, thereby granting larger villages and towns more leeway with development within the confines of their boundaries. It however 'washes' over smaller settlements and hamlets, these smaller locales thus given very little scope for expansion except in exceptional cases, with any infrastructure plans being put to greater public scrutiny and stricter controls more likely to be levied on any permitted work.

== Geography ==
Land area taken up by the belt is 60,700 hectares (607 km^{2}; 234 sq mi) as of 2017. The belt completely overlaps the Nottingham built-up area as well as beyond. It is contained within these districts, and encloses the following local settlements:

Derbyshire	Nottinghamshire
Amber Valley; Belper, Heanor, Langley Mill, Ripley: Erewash; Borrowash, Breaston, Ilkeston, Long Eaton, Sandiacre, West Hallam: South Derbyshire; Ambaston, Elvaston, Great Wilne	Ashfield; Annesley, Hucknall, Selston: Broxtowe; Beeston, Chilwell, Eastwood, Kimberley, Stapleford: Gedling; Arnold, Calverton, Carlton, Gedling, Ravenshead: Newark and Sherwood; Blidworth, Lowdham: Rushcliffe; Cotgrave, Keyworth, Radcliffe-on-Trent, Ruddington, West Bridgford

Along with the above, small portions of green belt exist within both cities on their rural fringes.

The Bolsover, Mansfield and North West Leicestershire districts border the belt, but do not contain any part of it.

== History ==
The Green Belt was first considered in Derbyshire in 1955 for the immediate region between the cities (South East Derbyshire Green Belt). It took several years to define the boundaries to some accuracy after local and government consultation. It was adopted in April 1983 by central government, with a more specific local plan being adopted from September 1994.

A matching 'Nottinghamshire Sketch Plan Green Belt' was first planned in Nottinghamshire from 1956, again taking several years to be fully realised, before being formally approved by government in July 1980, and locally in June 1989.

== See also ==
- Green belt (United Kingdom)
- Nottingham Urban Area
