= Harlequin, Nottinghamshire =

Coordinates: 52°56′49″N 1°01′15″W

Harlequin
- Location within Nottinghamshire
- Interactive map of Harlequin
- Civil parish: Radcliffe on Trent
- District: Rushcliffe
- Shire county: Nottinghamshire
- Region: East Midlands
- Country: England
- Sovereign state: United Kingdom
- Post town: NOTTINGHAM
- Postcode district: NG12
- Dialling code: 0115
- Police: Nottinghamshire
- Fire: Nottinghamshire
- Ambulance: East Midlands
- UK Parliament: Rushcliffe

Harlequin is an area to the east of the Nottinghamshire village of Radcliffe on Trent in England, the two settlements separated by the A52 trunk road.

It is contained within the Radcliffe on Trent civil parish, with Upper Saxondale to the east, and Radcliffe golf course and Dewberry Hill to the south.

== Geography ==
Harlequin lies immediately east of the main Radcliffe on Trent settlement and is physically separated from it by the A52 trunk road. It occupies land on the southern side of the wider Trent valley landscape, with higher ground and open countryside beyond.

The area is predominantly residential today, but retains its historical boundaries shaped by earlier horticultural and industrial land use.

== History ==
Until the start of the 20th century there were several plant nurseries within Harlequin, which could account for its name. One theory is that visitors to nearby Belvoir Castle saw the banked colours of glasshouses and nursery flowers and likened them to patterns of a harlequin costume.

Two brickworks businesses existed in the area until around 1940, along with several clay pits providing material.

The area contained little residential housing until the 1940s onwards, much of the nurseries being sold to provide land for development.

The area was notably once home to a Nottingham lace entrepreneur, George Mather.

== Transport ==
The A52 road runs directly between Harlequin and the main village, forming a major east–west transport corridor between Nottingham and Grantham.

Radcliffe railway station lies to the west, providing rail connections to Nottingham and Grantham and onward services beyond.

The area is also served by bus services operated by Trentbarton, with frequent daily services linking Radcliffe on Trent with Nottingham (approximately every 10 minutes on weekdays).

== See also ==
- Radcliffe on Trent
- Upper Saxondale
- A52 road
- Nottingham–Grantham line
