= Sneinton Asylum =

English psychiatric hospital (1812–1902)

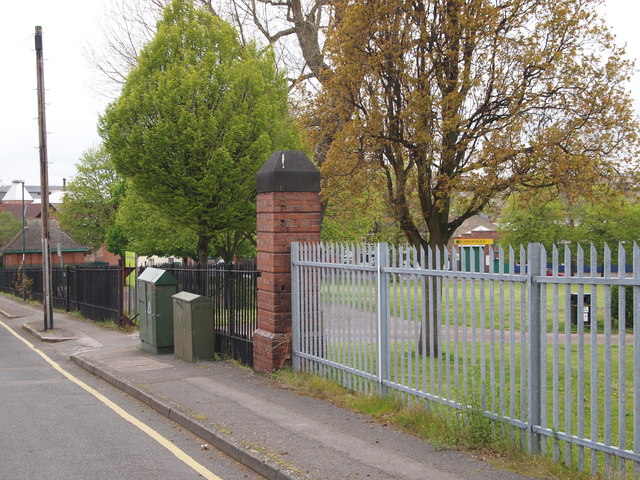
- This gate post is all that remains of Sneinton Asylum

- Shown in Nottinghamshire

Geography
- Location: Sneinton, Nottinghamshire, England, United Kingdom
- Coordinates: 52.9546°N 1.1330°W

Organisation
- Care system: County asylum system
- Type: Mental health

History
- Founded: 1812
- Closed: 1902

Links
- Lists: Hospitals in England

Sneinton Asylum was a psychiatric hospital at Sneinton in Nottingham, England. Opened in 1812 as the Nottingham General Lunatic Asylum, it was one of the earliest purpose-built institutions of its kind in the country.

It served as the principal county asylum for Nottinghamshire until the late 19th century, when its role was superseded by larger facilities including Saxondale Hospital.

The asylum closed in 1902, and the site was later redeveloped as King Edward Park.

== History ==
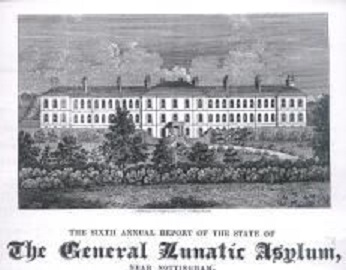
Wood engraving of the Sneinton Asylum

The Nottingham General Lunatic Asylum at Sneinton was among the earliest purpose-built county lunatic asylums developed under the system of publicly funded mental healthcare in England. Designed by Richard Ingleman of Southwell, it was constructed following the laying of the foundation stone on 31 May 1810, with the first patients admitted in February 1812. The original institution was intended to accommodate approximately 80 patients.

During the 19th century, growing demand for psychiatric care in Nottinghamshire led to successive expansions of provision beyond the original site. This included the establishment of the Coppice Lunatic Hospital in 1859 and the Mapperley Asylum in 1880, both of which absorbed surplus demand from Sneinton.

By the late 19th century the Sneinton asylum had become increasingly outdated in both scale and design, and patient services were gradually transferred to the newly constructed Saxondale Hospital near Radcliffe-on-Trent. Built as a larger, purpose-designed rural institution, Saxondale represented a shift in county asylum planning away from urban sites. Following the transfer of services, the Sneinton facility closed in 1902.

After closure, the former asylum buildings were adapted for educational use as King Edward's School, a boarding establishment. The school later closed, and the site was ultimately redeveloped as public open space, now known as King Edward Park.
