= GNP (disambiguation) =

GNP, or gross national product, also known as gross national income, is the total domestic and foreign economic output.

GNP may also refer to:

== Government and politics ==
- Purified National Party (Afrikaans: Gesuiwerde Nasionale Party), a political party in South Africa
- Gibraltar National Party, a political party in Gibraltar
- Grand National Party, a political party in South Korea
- Greater Nottingham Partnership, a local government alliance in England
- Grenada National Party, a political party in Grenada

== Music ==
- GNP Crescendo Records, an American record label
- GNP Records, an American jazz record label

== Other uses ==
- Gender neutral pronoun
- Global network positioning
- Gold nanoparticle
- Green national product

== See also ==
- Global Network of People living with HIV/AIDS, also known as GNP+
