= Saxondale Hospital =

Mental hospital near Nottingham

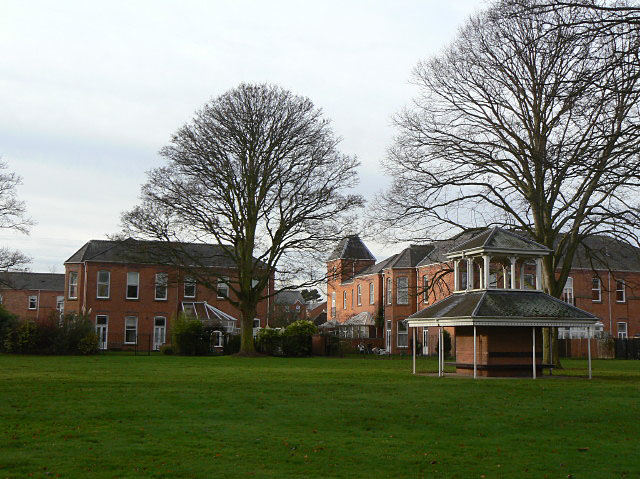
- Saxondale Hospital

- Shown in Nottinghamshire

Geography
- Location: Upper Saxondale near Radcliffe-on-Trent, Nottinghamshire, England, United Kingdom
- Coordinates: 52.9455°N 1.0021°W

Organisation
- Care system: Public NHS
- Type: Mental health

History
- Founded: 1902
- Closed: 1987

Links
- Lists: Hospitals in England

Saxondale Hospital was a psychiatric hospital near Radcliffe-on-Trent in Nottinghamshire, England. It was built at the turn of the 20th century to replace the Sneinton Asylum in Nottingham, reflecting the wider movement towards purpose-built county mental hospitals on rural sites. The hospital opened in 1902 as the Radcliffe Asylum and later became Saxondale Hospital in 1947 following its incorporation into the National Health Service. It closed in 1987 and the site has since been redeveloped as a residential area now known as Upper Saxondale.

== History ==
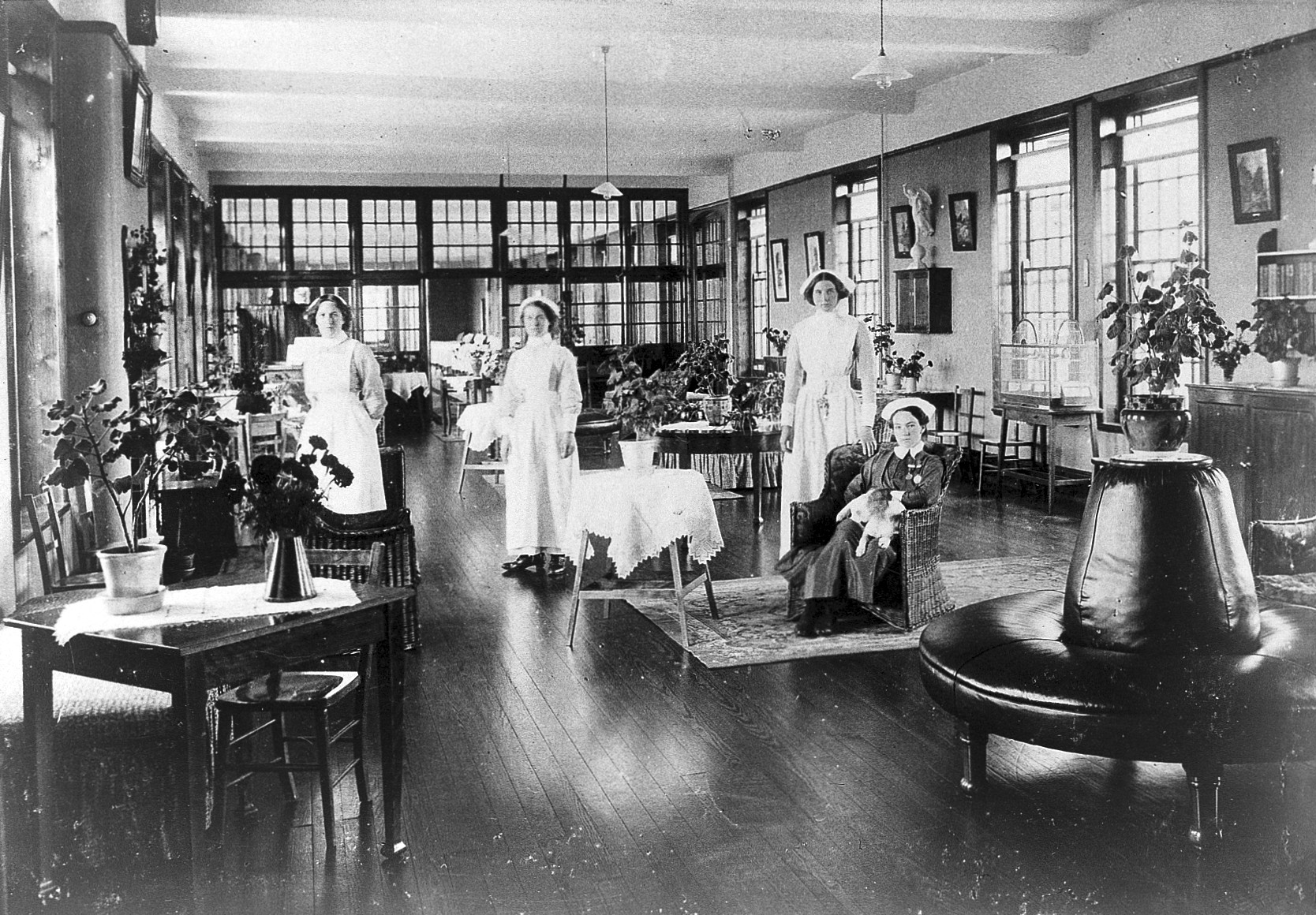
Nurses at Saxondale Hospital

The foundation stone was laid on 25 July 1899 by Lady Belper, wife of the chairman of Nottinghamshire County Council.

The new building was designed by architect Edgar Purnell Hooley, better known as the inventor of Tarmac. It was two storeys high, cost £147,000, and had accommodation for 452 patients (226 of each sex). The 130 acres (0.53 km^{2}) site cost £6,800.

It was officially opened as the Radcliffe Asylum by Lady Elinor Denison on 24 July 1902.

In 1913, extensions were added to accommodate a further 148 patients at a cost of £29,833. During the later stages of the First World War, the hospital was used as a military hospital from August 1918 to October 1919, treating soldiers suffering from shell shock.

In April 1922, the hospital was the site of a strike and occupation by members of the National Asylum Workers' Union.

Further expansion took place in 1932 with two additional blocks for 50 female patients each. The institution became known as Saxondale Hospital in 1947 and joined the National Health Service in 1948.

Additional villas were constructed in the grounds during the 1950s and 1960s.

A later allegation was made that Jimmy Savile lifted a girl's skirt at a disco held at the hospital when she was aged 14. The complainant was a local resident rather than a patient. Savile had a fundraising association with Saxondale Hospital from 1972 to the early 1980s. The official report stated that "there was no reason to doubt that she gave an honest and truthful account of the incident as she recalled it".

== Closure and later use ==
Saxondale Hospital closed in 1987 as part of the wider reduction in large psychiatric institutions across England during the late 20th century.

Following closure, parts of the complex were demolished, although a number of the original Victorian buildings and the surrounding parkland were retained due to their architectural and landscape value.

The site was subsequently redeveloped between the mid-1990s and early 2000s by David Wilson Homes into a residential estate of approximately 350 dwellings, incorporating converted hospital buildings alongside newly constructed housing. The development was initially marketed under the name “St James Park” before being renamed Upper Saxondale following local agreement in the late 1990s.

The former hospital grounds are now largely within a designated conservation area covering around 30 hectares, reflecting the importance of the remaining historic buildings, mature trees, and designed landscape.
