= George Hyde Pownall =

English artist

- Born: 1866
- Died: 24 January 1939 (aged 72–73)
- Occupation: Painter

George Hyde Pownall

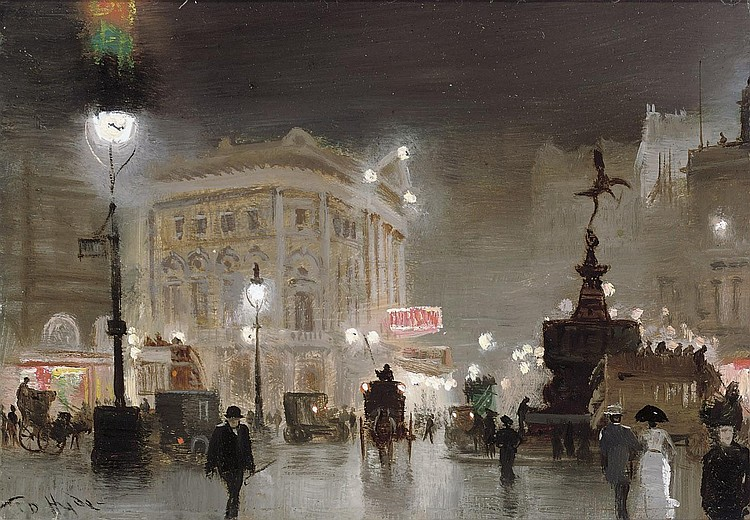
Piccadilly Circus by George Hyde Pownall.

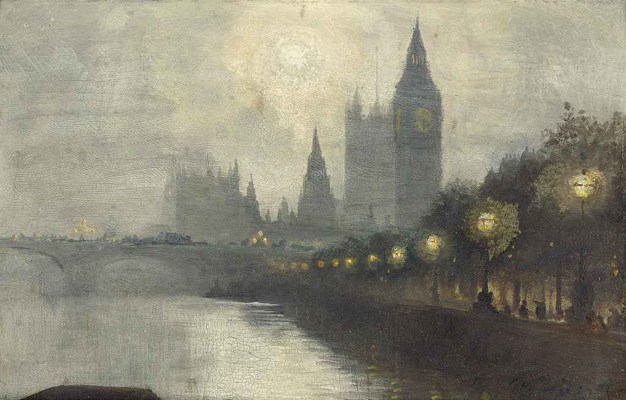
Westminster

George Hyde Pownall (1866 – 24 January 1939) was an English artist known for his depictions of London street scenes. He later emigrated to Australia where he painted the expanding city of Melbourne. He was a noted musician in England and continued his musical career in Australia.

== Early life and family ==
George Hyde Pownall was born in Radcliffe-on-Trent, Nottinghamshire, in 1866. His wife was Mary Blanche Pownall with whom he had two daughters, Vera Blanche Pownall, and Gertrude Olga Pownall. They had two other sons and a daughter who all pre-deceased Pownall. One, Francis George Hyde Pownall, enlisted in the Australian Army and was killed at Pozières in France during the First World War.

In 1912 he was living at 53 Cambridge Gardens, Kensington.

== Musical career ==
In England he studied music under Dan Price at the Royal College of Music and was a well-known tenor in London in the 1890s. He was on the musical staff at Westminster Abbey and St Andrew's church, Wells Street. He was a soloist at St Mary's Roman Catholic Church for ten years and a member of the choir of Westminster Cathedral. As an instrumentalist, he worked as a pianist for the vaudeville orchestra at St George's Hall, Marylebone, and was a conductor of the Maskelyne and Devant orchestra. He toured Britain as the pianist for Sir Herbert Tree.

He continued his musical career in Australia.

== Art career ==
Pownall specialised in small paintings of London Street scenes. He worked at a time when horse-drawn and motor vehicle traffic coexisted in London streets and gas light was still commonplace making his nocturnal or twilight images very evocative. His work has been compared to John Atkinson Grimshaw and James Abbott McNeill Whistler in its impressionistic feeling.

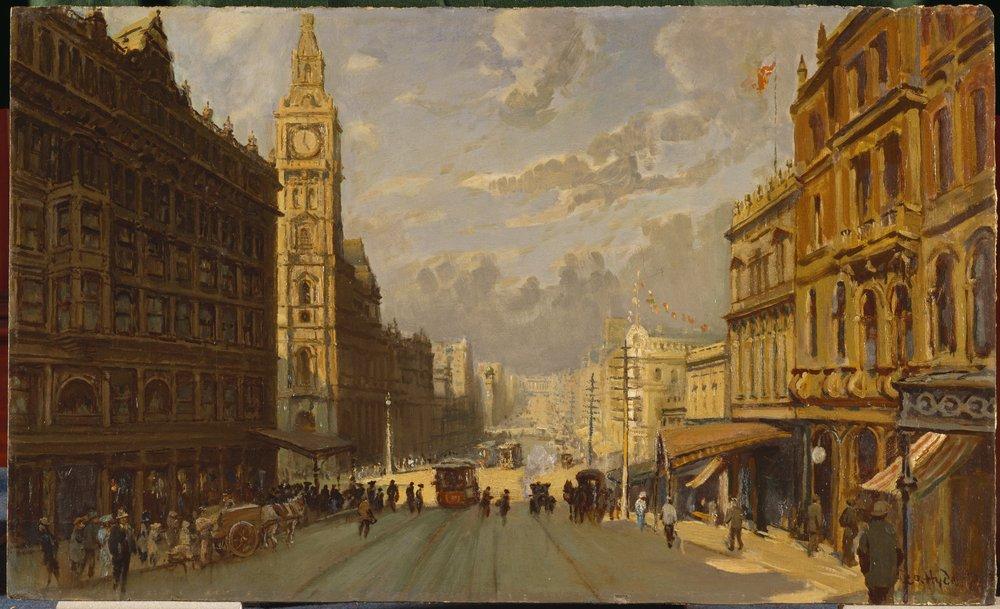
Bourke Street east - A Melbourne street, painted circa 1912, and now in the collection of the State Library of Victoria

He emigrated to Australia, arriving in Sydney and, after around three years, settled in Melbourne in around 1914. He lived in the St Kilda district of Melbourne from 1924. The Cowen Gallery of the State Library of Victoria owns Bourke Street east and Collins Street, both painted around 1912.

== Death and legacy ==
Pownall died on 24 January 1939.

== See also ==
- Frederick Hyde Pownall
