= Cropwell Butler =

Village and civil parish in Nottinghamshire, England

Coordinates: 52.928°N 0.985°W

- Village and civil parish
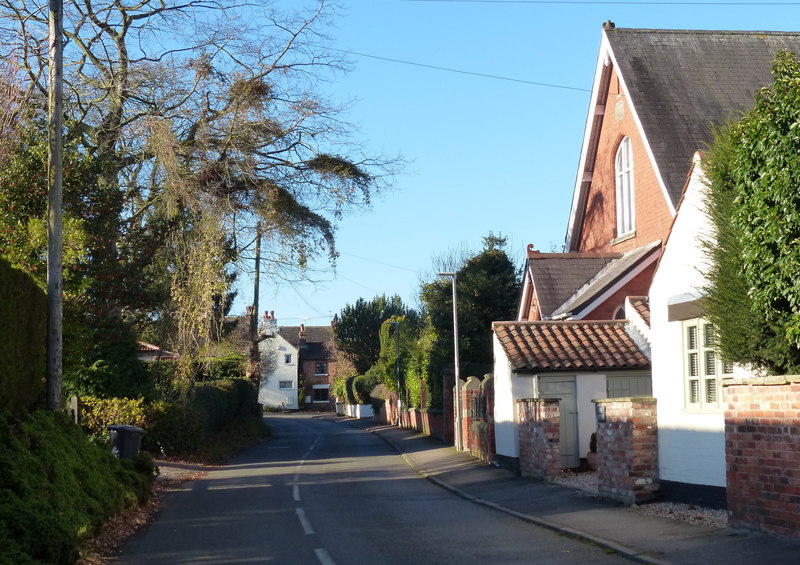
- Tythby Road

- Location within Nottinghamshire
- Interactive map of Cropwell Butler
- Area: 2.23 sq mi (5.8 km^{2})
- Population: 651 (2021)
  - Density: 292/sq mi (113/km^{2})
- OS grid reference: SK 685370
  - London: 105 mi (169 km) SSE
- District: Rushcliffe
- Shire county: Nottinghamshire
- Region: East Midlands
- Country: England
- Sovereign state: United Kingdom
- Post town: NOTTINGHAM
- Postcode district: NG12
- Dialling code: 0115
- Police: Nottinghamshire
- Fire: Nottinghamshire
- Ambulance: East Midlands
- UK Parliament: Rushcliffe
- Website: www.cropwellbutler.com

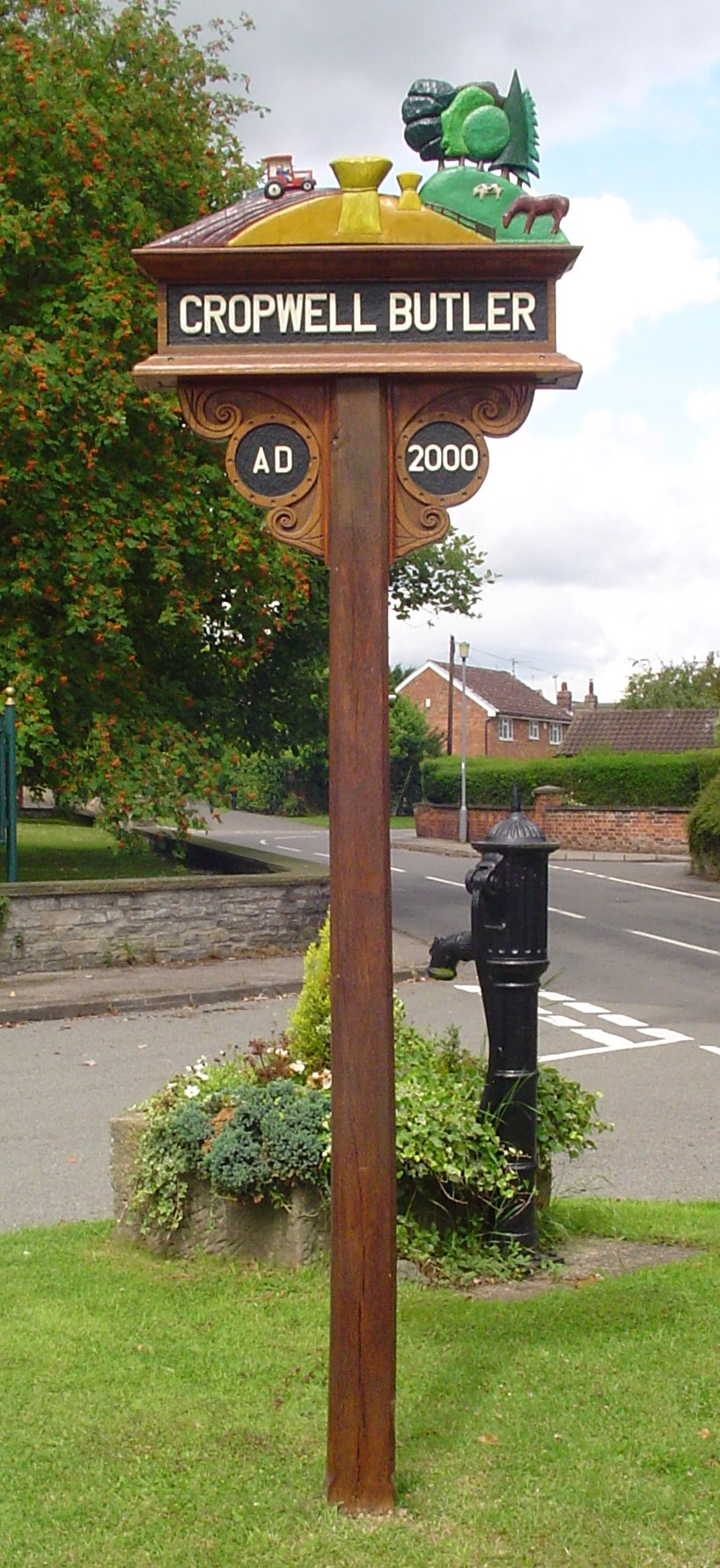
Signpost in Cropwell Butler

Cropwell Butler is a village and civil parish in the borough of Rushcliffe in Nottinghamshire, United Kingdom, one mile east of the A46, under the NG12 postcode. It shares a parish council with Tithby and is adjacent to the south to Cropwell Bishop.

== Location and governance ==
The civil parish population recorded in the 2011 census was 585, increasing to 651 at the 2021 census. Some of the newly built Upper Saxondale residential area also falls within the parish boundary.

Cropwell Butler shares with Tithby a parish council that meets once a month. The village forms part of the Cropwell Ward of the borough of Rushcliffe and of the Parliamentary Constituency of Rushcliffe. The county authority is Nottinghamshire.

== Historical events ==
A post windmill at Cropwell Butler (grid reference SK692368) was blown down in 1837. The miller escaped, but with severe bruising, by hiding in a hollow place under a beam.

During the Second World War, German bombers left a trail of devastation across the Nottingham area on the night of 8–9 May 1941, when 95 aircraft attacked the city at 12.37 am. Among the documents now held at the Notts Archives Offices is a detailed map of the city showing the sites the Germans intended to target, which included a gas works, electricity plants, railways, the Royal Ordnance Factory, Raleigh and some chemical factories. In reality, some of the Luftwaffe crews were deflected by a Starfish site at Cropwell Butler – waste land deliberately set alight to lure them away from key targets. So some of them bombed the Vale of Belvoir by mistake, thinking it was Nottingham and killing only livestock.

== Amenities ==
The village has a pub, The Plough Inn in Main Street, which also serves meals. This and the Village Hall and Sheldon Field are the only remaining public facilities in what is a small and quiet village. The post office and the few independent shops fell to a housing development, Carpenters Close, in the late 1970s and early 1980s.

There is neither a school nor an Anglican church in the village. The Methodist chapel has regular services on the first, third and fourth Sundays of each month.

== Transport ==
Cropwell Butler has hourly daytime buses on weekdays to Bingham (No. 833. Centrebus) and to Oxton via Radcliffe, Lowdham, Woodborough and Calverton (No 747 NottsBus Connect). The nearest railway stations are Radcliffe (2.6 miles, 4.2 km) and Bingham (3.4 miles, 5.5 km), both on the Nottingham–Grantham–Skegness line.

== Sports ==
The Sheldon Field provides the pitch for a number of football teams in the East Midlands Public Authorities Amateur League (EMPAL). Both Butler-Benfica FC (Cropwell Butler) and Chequers Rangers United (Cropwell Bishop) play at the Sheldon Field on Sunday mornings.

== See also ==
- Listed buildings in Cropwell Butler
