= Listed buildings in Cropwell Butler =

Cropwell Butler is a civil parish in the Rushcliffe district of Nottinghamshire, England. The parish contains seven listed buildings that are recorded in the National Heritage List for England. All the listed buildings are designated at Grade II, the lowest of the three grades, which is applied to "buildings of national importance and special interest". The parish contains the village of Cropwell Butler and the surrounding area, and the listed buildings consist of five houses, a milepost on the Grantham Canal, and a war memorial lychgate.

== Buildings ==
| Name and location | Photograph | Date | Notes |
|---|---|---|---|
| The Poplars; 52.92760°N 0.98312°W | — | Early 18th century | The house is in brick, with a sawtooth eaves cornice, and a slate roof with stone coped gables. There are two storeys, a front range of three bays, and a lower four-bay rear wing. The central doorway has a fanlight with Gothic glazing, and a small wooden hood on moulded brackets. The windows are sashes, in the ground floor with stuccoed lintels and raised keystones, and in the upper floor with moulded surrounds. |
| West Lea; 52.92829°N 0.98603°W | — | Mid 18th century | A brick house with a modillion eaves cornice, and a slate roof with stone coped gables. There are two storeys and attics, a main range with five bays, a parallel rear range, and a later rear wing. On the front is a square porch with modillion eaves and a blocking course, and a doorway with pilasters. The windows are sashes with incised stuccoed lintels and raised keystones. |
| Canal milepost 52.92411°N 0.99973°Wa | | Late 18th century | The canal milepost is on the southwest side of the Grantham Canal. It is in cast iron, and consists of a post with a rounded head and a moulded edge. The milepost is inscribed with the distance from the River Trent. |
| The Grange; 52.93014°N 0.98386°W | | Early 19th century | A house in gault brick, with pilaster quoins, oversailing eaves, and a hipped slate roof. There are two storeys and fronts of three bays. The central doorway is set in a round-arched recessed panel with moulded impost blocks and gauged brick arches, and it has a fanlight. The windows are sashes, and on the garden front is a two-storey canted bay window. |
| The Court, stable wing and dovecote 52.92782°N 0.98431°W | | Early to mid 19th century | The house is stuccoed, on a stone plinth, with oversailing eaves on paired brackets, and a hipped slate roof. There are two storeys, a main range of four bays, a two-storey bay to the right, and rear wings. The windows are sashes, there are canted bay windows, and in the left return is a doorway with pilasters. The stable wing at the rear has a round-arched entrance and a doorway with a fanlight, above which is a loading door. On the roof is an octagonal dovecote with a dome and a weather vane. |
| The Grove; 52.93117°N 0.99322°W | | 1837 | A rendered house on a stone plinth, with oversailing eaves, and a hipped slate roof. There are two storeys, a symmetrical front of three bays, a rear addition with a parapet, and a lower brick extension on the left. In the centre is a square open porch with pilaster jambs and an entablature, and a doorway with a fanlight. The windows are casements in segmental-arched recesses, and on the right return is a two-storey canted bay window. |
| Lychgate war memorial 52.92449°N 0.97979°W | | 1920 | The lychgate at the entry to the cemetery is also a war memorial. It has stone plinths, a timber superstructure, and a tile roof with a Latin cross. On one of the beams is an inscription, and inside the lychgate is a bronze plaque with an inscription and the names of those lost in the First World War. |
