= St Mary's Church, Radcliffe on Trent =

Coordinates: 52°56′47″N 01°02′30″W

St. Mary's Church, Radcliffe on Trent
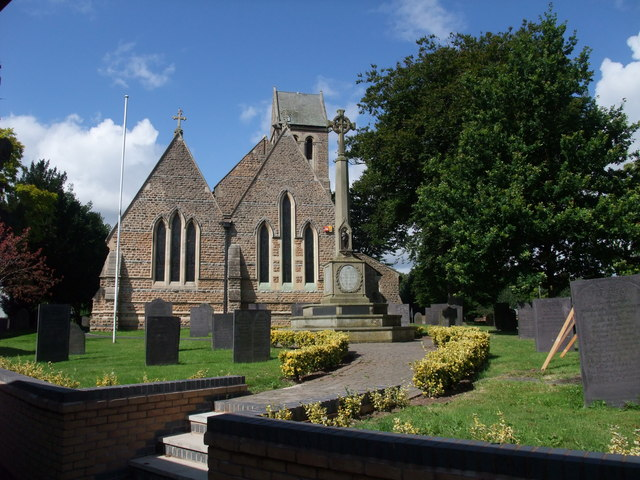
- St. Mary's Church, Radcliffe on Trent
- Denomination: Church of England
- Churchmanship: Broad Church
- Website: www.stmarysradcliffe.org

History
- Dedication: St. Mary

Administration
- Province: York
- Diocese: Southwell and Nottingham
- Parish: Radcliffe on Trent

Clergy
- Vicar: Canon Mark Tanner

St Mary's Church is a parish church in the Church of England in Radcliffe on Trent, Nottinghamshire.

The church is Grade II listed by the Department for Digital, Culture, Media and Sport as it is a building of special architectural or historic interest.

== History ==
There was a medieval church but little remains. The chancel was built in 1858 by Charles Bailey of Newark-on-Trent. The rest was built by Joseph Goddard and Alfred Henry Paget of Leicester between 1879 and 1880.

It is now part of the united parish with St. Peter and St. Paul's Church, Shelford.

== Bells ==
There are eight bells by Taylors of Loughborough dating from 1947. The heaviest is 15 cwt.

== Parsonage ==
The parsonage house dates from 1827 and was designed by Henry Moses Wood.

== See also ==
- Listed buildings in Radcliffe-on-Trent
