= Listed buildings in Radcliffe-on-Trent =

Radcliffe-on-Trent is a civil parish in the Rushcliffe district of Nottinghamshire, England. The parish contains nine listed buildings that are recorded in the National Heritage List for England. All the listed buildings are designated at Grade II, the lowest of the three grades, which is applied to "buildings of national importance and special interest". The parish contains the village of Radcliffe-on-Trent and the surrounding area. The listed buildings consist of houses, a church, headstones in the churchyard, a public house, a railway viaduct, and a water fountain and troughs.

== Buildings ==
Name and location	Photograph	Date	Notes
The Manor House; 52.94722°N 1.04240°W	—	Late 17th century	The house, which has been extended and used for other purposes, is in red brick, rendered at the base, with stone dressings, quoins, and a slate roof with stone coped gables and kneelers. There are two storeys and three bays, the outer bays gabled. In the centre is a gabled porch and a doorway with a fanlight. To its left is a canted bay window, the other windows in the ground floor are sashes and above are casement windows under segmental arches. To the right, and recessed, is a two-storey three-bay wing. At the rear are the remains of, and restored, mullioned windows.
Group of headstones, St Mary's Church; 52.94636°N 1.04196°W		1698	The 99 headstones are in a triangular plot to the south of the church. They are almost all in Swithland slate, with flat and curved tops and delicately inscribed fronts, and are laid out in very irregular north to south lines. The dates are between 1698 and 1836.
The Old Manor House; 52.94539°N 1.04772°W	—	Mid 18th century	A house in red brick, rendered at the base, it has a pantile roof with a brick coped left gable and a kneeler. There are two storeys and six bays, and a rear wing with a slate roof. The windows are casements, most of which are under segmental arches.
Radcliffe Hall; 52.94625°N 1.04242°W		Late 18th century	The house that was later extended and used for other purposes, it is rendered, on a stone plinth, with a pantile roof. The original block has two storeys and three bays, and a lean-to on the left. The central doorway has pilasters with fluted panels, fluted imposts with dentil, a fanlight, and an arch with reeded panels and a fluted keystone, and the windows are sashes. The later wing has two storeys and three bays, and a two-storey canted bay window under a conical roof.
Radcliffe Lodge; 52.94846°N 1.04166°W	—	Late 18th century	A country house, later divided, it is in rendered red brick on a painted plinth, with stone dressings, a parapet with a cornice, and a hipped slate roof. There are two storeys and eight bays. The middle two bays project under a pediment, and contain a single-storey bow window with an iron balustrade. The windows are sashes. At the rear is a doorway with chamfered rusticated pilasters, fluted imposts, a triglyph frieze and a cornice. To the left is a lower two-storey four-bay range.
Manvers Arms Public House; 52.94689°N 1.04181°W		Early 19th century	The public house is in rendered brick on a plinth, with a hipped slate roof and overhanging eaves. There are two storeys and three bays, the middle bay semicircular with a conical roof and containing three round-arched openings. The windows are casements with pointed arched lights.
Rectory Junction Viaduct; 52.95112°N 1.05403°W		1851	The bridge was built by the Great Northern Railway to carry its line over the River Trent. The south part is in brick, and consists of three elliptical stone arches with rusticated voussoirs, and stone cutwaters. Above the arches is a stone band, and a brick parapet with stone coping. The north part is crossed by a cast iron span made by Clayton & Shuttleworth. This has lattice girding and iron railings, and is flanked by rusticated stone piers.
St Mary's Church; 52.94651°N 1.04203°W		1879–80	The church is built in stone with roofs of slate, pantile and felt. It consists of a nave with a clerestory, a west porch, north and south aisles, a chancel, a north vestry and organ chamber, a south chapel, and a northwest tower. The tower has three stages, a plinth, bands, a west doorway with a hood mould, lancet windows, a clock face, three circular stair windows, two-light bell openings, and a saddleback roof with four gargoyles.
Water Fountain and troughs 52.94665°N 1.04027°W		1902	The building is in stone and has a plinth and pilasters carrying an entablature within which is an inscribed copper plaque, and on the top is a dome with a finial. At the front and the rear are stone troughs.
