= Radcliffe-on-Trent =

Town and civil parish in Nottinghamshire, England

Coordinates: 52.947°N 1.040°W

- Town and Civil Parish
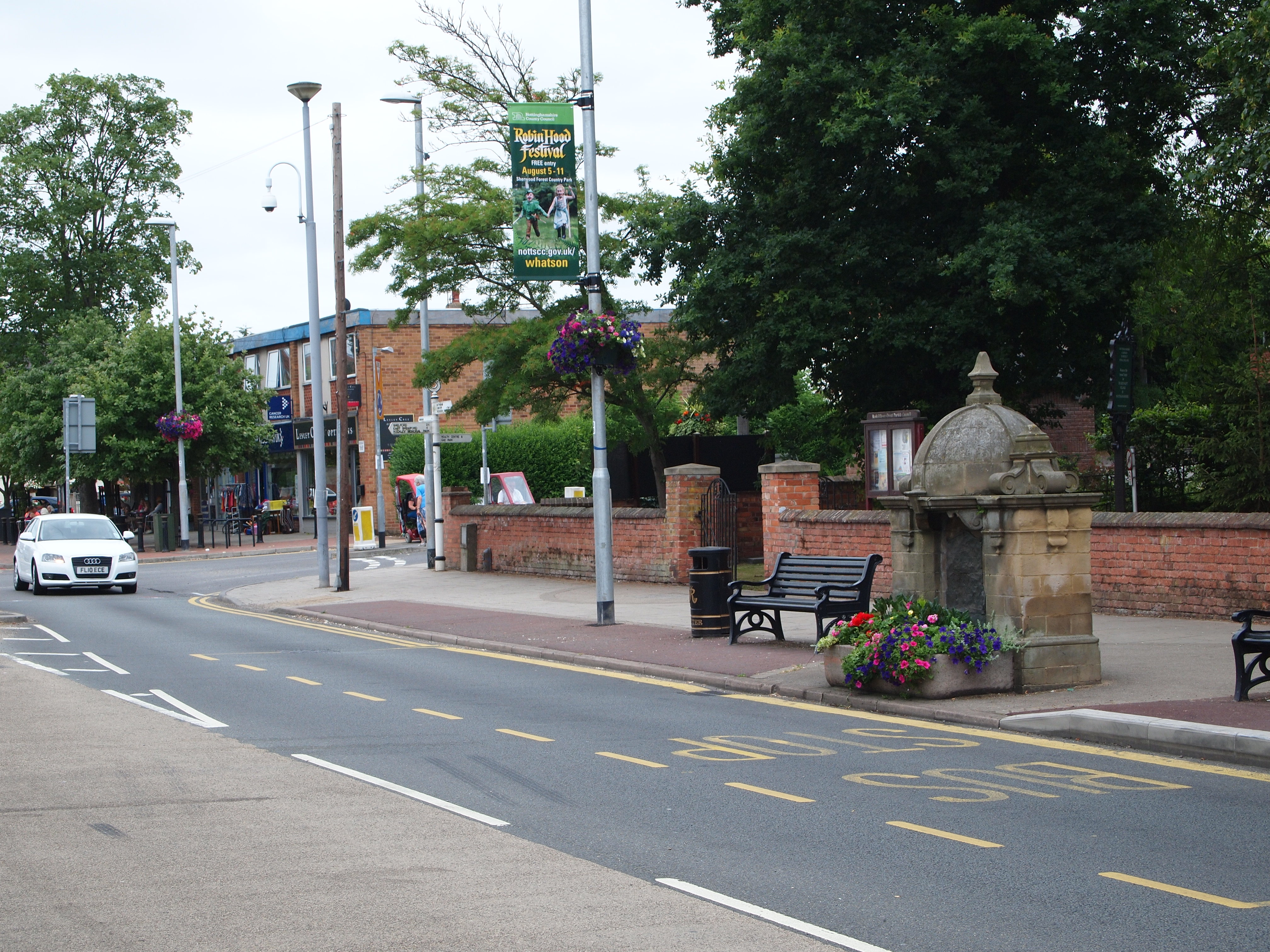
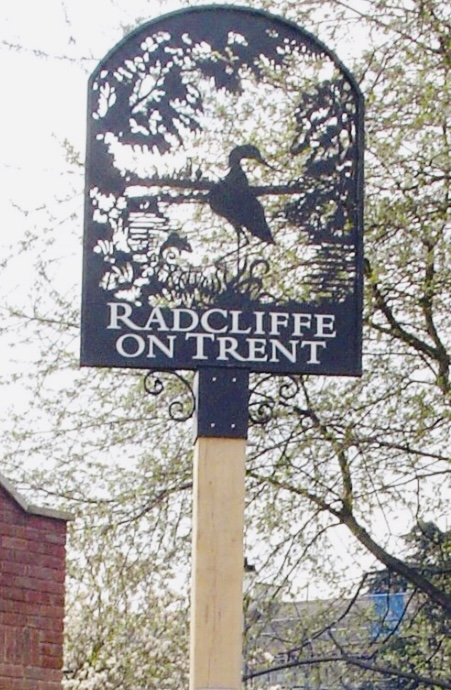
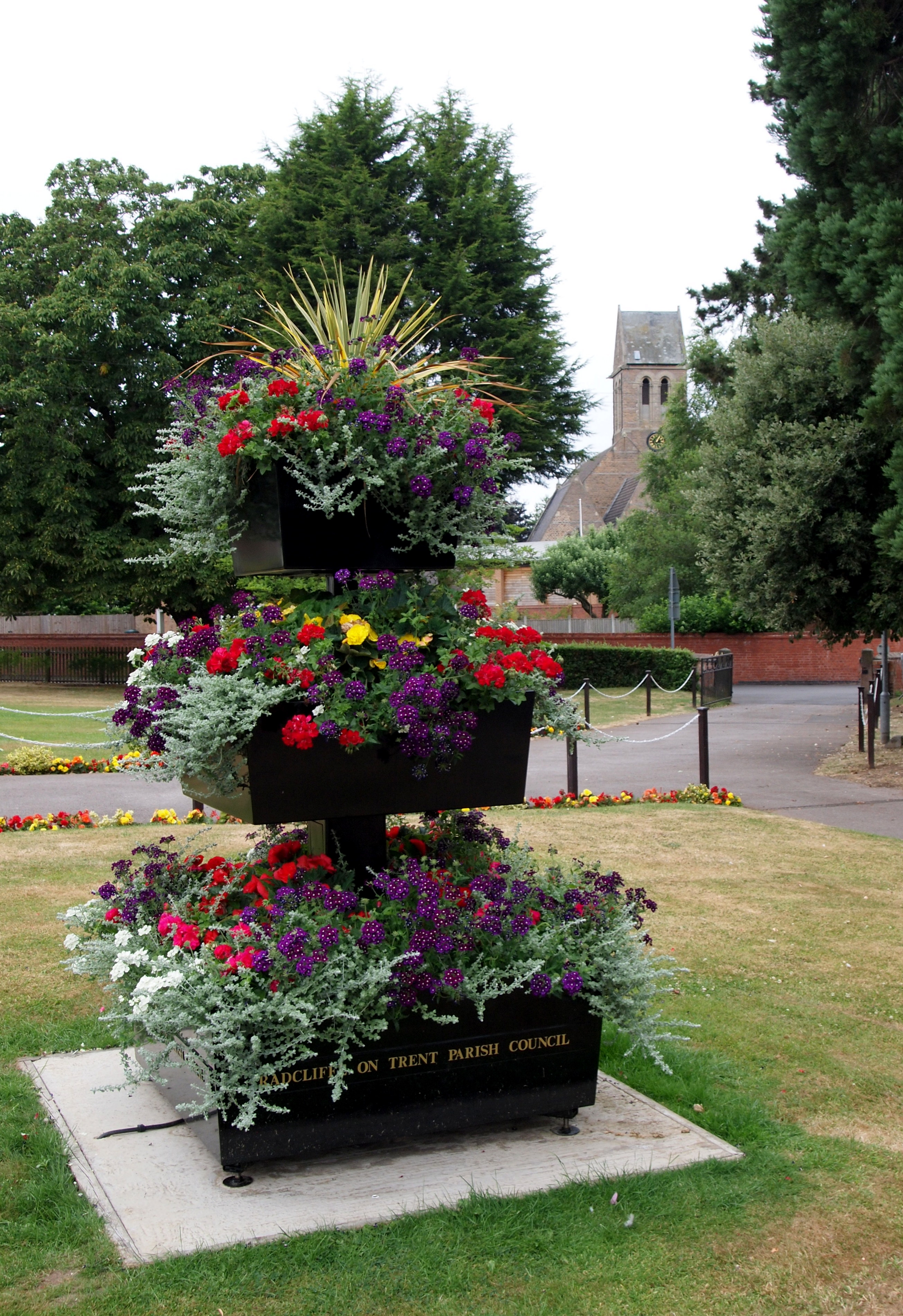
- Main Road Village Sign Vicarage Lane

- Location within Nottinghamshire
- Interactive map of Radcliffe-on-Trent
- Area: 5.80 sq mi (15.0 km^{2})
- Population: 8,144 (2021 Census)
  - Density: 1,404/sq mi (542/km^{2})
- OS grid reference: SK 64497 39312
  - London: 128 mi (206 km) SSE
- District: Rushcliffe
- Shire county: Nottinghamshire
- Region: East Midlands
- Country: England
- Sovereign state: United Kingdom
- Settlements: Radcliffe on Trent; Harlequin
- Post town: NOTTINGHAM
- Postcode district: NG12
- Dialling code: 0115
- Police: Nottinghamshire
- Fire: Nottinghamshire
- Ambulance: East Midlands
- UK Parliament: Rushcliffe
- Website: https://www.rotpc.com

Radcliffe-on-Trent is a town and civil parish in the Rushcliffe borough of Nottinghamshire, England. The population of the Town at the Census 2011 was 8,205, falling slightly at the Census 2021 to 8,144

== Geography ==
Radcliffe-on-Trent lies to the east of Nottingham, close to but not part of the Greater Nottingham built-up area. However, the Greater Nottingham Partnership treats the whole of Rushcliffe as part of the wider conurbation.

The village lies on the south bank and cliff overlooking the River Trent. Nearby places include Bingham, Shelford, East Bridgford, Holme Pierrepont and Stoke Bardolph.

The settlement takes its name from the distinctive red cliffs formed of Triassic Mercia Mudstone with gypsum banding.

== Etymology ==
The "Rad" element of the name derives from the Old English rēad meaning red, referring to the colour of the cliffs above the River Trent.

The cliffs are composed of Triassic Mercia Mudstone with gypsum interbeds, giving the locality its distinctive appearance.

== History ==
=== Early settlement ===
The present village of Radcliffe-on-Trent originated as three separate settlements: Radcliffe, Lamcote and Harlequin.

Radcliffe and Lamcote are ancient agricultural settlements, both recorded in the Domesday Book of 1086.

The centres of Lamcote and Radcliffe were approximately 400 metres apart along the historic Nottingham–Grantham road, separated by open fields. Over time they have merged into a continuous settlement, although Lamcote survives in local toponymy in road names in the western part of the village.

Harlequin developed in the 19th century approximately one mile to the east along the same route, centred on brick pits and horticultural greenhouses, and remains a distinct residential area south of the A52 road.

=== Railway and Victorian expansion ===
The arrival of the railway in 1850 was a major catalyst for growth. The Nottingham–Grantham line provided rapid access to Nottingham, encouraging residential expansion.

Radcliffe railway station opened in 1850 as part of the Ambergate, Nottingham, Boston and Eastern Junction Railway and was designed by architect Thomas Chambers Hine.

The station’s arrival transformed Radcliffe into a commuter settlement for Nottingham during the Victorian period.

=== Roads and industrial innovation ===
The western end of the historic Nottingham–Grantham road now forms part of the A52 road and becomes Radcliffe Road as it passes Trent Bridge cricket ground.

Radcliffe Road is associated with an early development in modern road engineering. In 1902, Nottinghamshire County Surveyor Edgar Purnell Hooley developed and patented an early form of tarmacadam, later commercialised as "Tarmac". One of the earliest recorded applications of this material was on Radcliffe Road, which is frequently cited in local and engineering histories as one of the earliest surfaced roads using the method.

Hooley’s process involved combining heated tar with crushed stone to produce a smoother and more durable road surface, marking a significant development in modern road construction techniques.

=== Saxondale and Upper Saxondale ===
To the south-east of the Town lies the former Saxondale Hospital site, now redeveloped as Upper Saxondale with approximately 350 dwellings.

The hospital was a large psychiatric institution established in the early 20th century as part of Nottinghamshire County’s asylum system and remained in use until its closure in the late 20th century. The site has since been redeveloped and now forms a separate Town.

== Transport ==
Radcliffe railway station provides direct services west to Nottingham and east towards Grantham and beyond along the Nottingham–Grantham line.

The village is served by frequent bus services operated by Trentbarton, providing regular links to Nottingham at intervals of approximately ten minutes on weekdays.

== Education ==
The village is served by an infant and nursery school and a junior school for primary-age pupils. Secondary education is provided by South Nottinghamshire Academy, a comprehensive school formerly known as Dayncourt School. The name derives from the de Aincourt family, recorded in the Domesday Book as lords of a manor in Radcliffe.

A National School was built in 1870 and enlarged in 1876. The present secondary school dates from the mid-20th century.

== Recreation and leisure ==
The village has several public open spaces. Rockley Memorial Park, donated to the community in 1927 by Lisle Rockley in memory of his son William, who was killed in the First World War, is the principal recreational green space. The park includes the Cliff Walk, a riverside footpath along the south bank of the River Trent leading west towards Shelford.

Additional facilities include a recreation ground, skate park, and sports fields at the eastern end of the village.

Cricket has been played in Radcliffe since at least the early 19th century, and has been associated with players including George Parr and Richard Daft.

Radcliffe Olympic F.C. was founded in 1876 and originally played on Holme Lane before relocating to its present ground in the late 19th century.

Radcliffe-on-Trent Golf Club was established in 1909.

The village also has local groups affiliated with the Boys' Brigade and The Scout Association. A kickboxing club operates in affiliation with KickboxUK.

== Places of worship ==
The village has three Christian places of worship, all located close to the village centre.

St Mary's is the Church of England Town church. A church on this site is recorded from the 13th century, and the present building is largely a Victorian reconstruction following the collapse of the medieval steeple in 1792. The church was rebuilt and enlarged in 1879–80 to designs by Joseph Goddard and Alfred Henry Paget. It is a Grade II listed building.

St Anne's Church serves the local Roman Catholic community. The town was established in the 19th century following Catholic emancipation, and the present church building on New Road opened in 1962.

A Methodist congregation has been present in Radcliffe since the late 18th century. Wesleyan and Primitive Methodist chapels were built in the 19th century, and following Methodist union, worship is now centred on the Shelford Road chapel.

== Notable people ==
John Boot (1815–1860), founder of the pharmacy chain Boots, was born in Radcliffe.

George Hyde Pownall (1866–1939), an artist noted for his cityscape paintings of London and Melbourne, was born in Radcliffe.

Samuel Morley (1829–1888), a soldier and recipient of the Victoria Cross, was born and baptised at St Mary's Church in Radcliffe-on-Trent. He served in the 2nd Battalion, Military Train (later the Royal Army Service Corps), and was awarded the Victoria Cross for gallantry during the Indian Rebellion of 1857.

Tom Graham (born 1980), an actor raised in Radcliffe-on-Trent, is known for his role as Tom Archer in the BBC Radio 4 serial drama The Archers.

=== Sporting figures ===
George Parr (1826–1891), who played for Nottinghamshire and the England cricket team, was born and died in the village. He captained the first England team to tour overseas in 1859.

Richard Daft (1835–1900), a cricketer and captain of Nottinghamshire, died in Radcliffe-on-Trent.

Harry Daft (1866–1945), son of Richard Daft, was born in Radcliffe-on-Trent. He represented England in both cricket and football and was part of the Notts County F.C. side that won the FA Cup in 1894.

Ian Woan (born 1967), a professional footballer who played for Nottingham Forest F.C., lived near Radcliffe-on-Trent.

Gary Mills (born 1961), who played in the 1980 European Cup Final, lives in Radcliffe-on-Trent.

Billy Walker (1897–1964), a footballer and manager associated with Aston Villa F.C. and Nottingham Forest F.C., died at Saxondale Hospital.

Mark Shardlow (born 1961), a sports commentator, lives in Radcliffe-on-Trent.

== See also ==
- River Trent
- Nottinghamshire
- Rushcliffe
- Listed buildings in Radcliffe-on-Trent
- St Mary's Church, Radcliffe on Trent
- Radcliffe Olympic F.C.
