= Nottingham Urban Area =

Area of land in and around Nottingham, England

Coordinates: 52.96°N 1.15°W

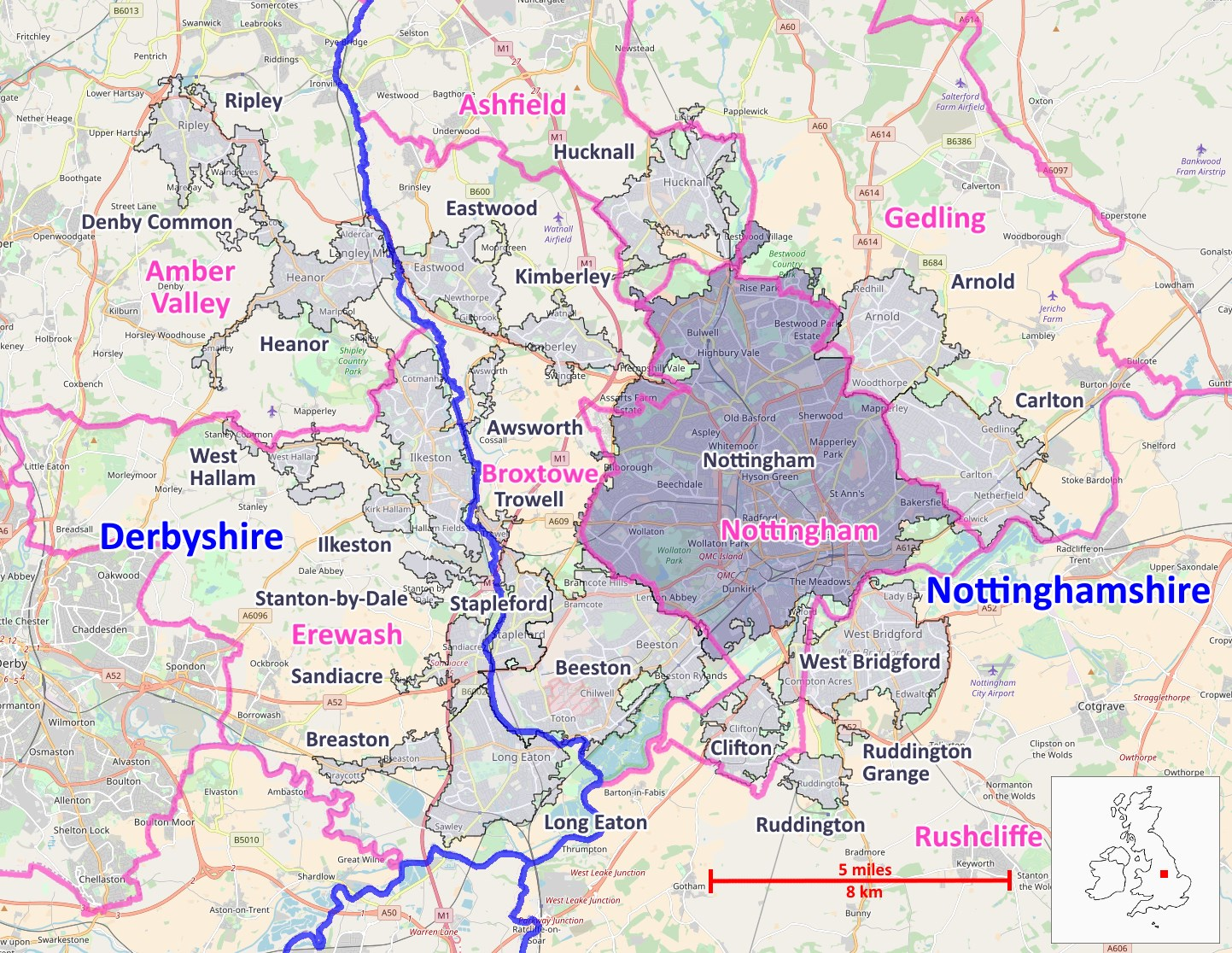
Nottingham built-up area subdivisions, 2011 Nottingham subdivision Other subdivisions Districts County boundary

The Nottingham Built-up Area (BUA), Nottingham Urban Area, or Greater Nottingham is an area of land defined by the Office for National Statistics as built-up land with a minimum area of 20 hectares (200,000 m^{2}), while settlements within 200 metres of each other with a direct road route are linked. It consists of the city of Nottingham and the adjoining urban areas of Nottinghamshire and Derbyshire, in the East Midlands of England. It had a total population of 719,400 at the time of the 2021 census. This was an decrease of almost 1.5% since the 2011 census recorded population of 729,977.

== Geography ==
Greater Nottingham is largely within the three districts of Rushcliffe, Broxtowe and Gedling surrounding the city, though the area spills into the Nottinghamshire district of Ashfield, and also to the Amber Valley and Erewash districts of Derbyshire. The Nottingham Urban Area is, by the ONS' 2011 figures, the 8th largest in England (9th in the UK), with a population size between that of the Tyneside and Sheffield built-up areas; in 2021 it had a total area of 64.6 square miles (167 km^{2}).

Sub-divisions do not always match administrative geographic boundaries; the areas can be smaller than an administrative area; the subdivision of Clifton (22,395 residents) for example in 2021, although within the Nottingham Unitary Authority city area but was left out of the overall conurbation. The Nottingham subdivision oversteps the city's borders at several locations.

In the 1991 census, Ilkeston was considered outside of the Nottingham Urban Area, and its addition gave the BUA an 8% increase in 2001. This was due to improvements in mapping methodology by the ONS, and is chiefly responsible for the increase in sub-divisions over censuses rather than any large scale 'bricks and mortar' building, as much of the area between the cities is protected green belt and wedges, restricting actual development.

The conurbation methodology was changed for the 2021 census to only amalgamate built up areas linked by a direct road connection, this resulted in a number of the 2011 areas being dropped. This notably included Clifton which is within the administrative area of the city, however a number of new divisions primarily formed along civil parish boundaries were created. Overall, these new areas were not enough to offset the loss with net effect of a reduction in population since 2011.

Urban subdivision	Population					District	County
Urban subdivision	1981	1991	2001	2011	2021	District	County
Nottingham	273,300	270,222	249,584	289,301	299,790	City of Nottingham	Nottinghamshire
Carlton	46,053	47,302	48,493	49,235	53,555	Gedling	Nottinghamshire
Beeston	64,785	66,626	66,683	51,479	52,355	Broxtowe	Nottinghamshire
Ilkeston	—	—	37,270	38,640	38,725	Erewash	Derbyshire
Arnold	37,721	37,646	37,402	37,768	40,010	Gedling	Nottinghamshire
Long Eaton	42,285	44,826	46,490	37,760	37,820	Erewash	Derbyshire
West Bridgford	27,463	33,843	43,395	45,509	36,490	Rushcliffe	Nottinghamshire
Hucknall	27,463	29,160	29,188	32,107	35,840	Ashfield	Nottinghamshire
Heanor	21,863	22,180	22,620	25,644	24,260	Amber Valley	Derbyshire
Ripley	17,548	18,310	18,523	19,315	20,180	Amber Valley	Derbyshire
Eastwood	18,085	19,363	18,612	18,422	18,890	Broxtowe	Nottinghamshire
Stapleford	—	—	—	16,190	15,045	Broxtowe	Nottinghamshire
Nuthall and Watnall	—	—	—	—	9,585	Broxtowe	Nottinghamshire
Sandiacre	—	—	—	9,600	9,370	Erewash	Derbyshire
Wilford	—	—	—	—	4,850	City of Nottingham	Nottinghamshire
Edwalton	—	—	—	—	4,760	Rushcliffe	Nottinghamshire
Kimberley	9,818	10,488	11,027	11,353	4,470	Broxtowe	Nottinghamshire
Awsworth	—	—	—	2,517	2,445	Broxtowe	Nottinghamshire
Smalley	—	—	—	—	2,200	Amber Valley	Derbyshire
Gamston	—	—	—	—	2,175	Rushcliffe	Nottinghamshire
Trowell	—	—	1,013	953	2,165	Broxtowe	Nottinghamshire
Bestwood Village	—	—	—	—	2,150	Gedling/Ashfield	Nottinghamshire
Swingate	—	—	—	—	910	Broxtowe	Nottinghamshire
Denby Common	—	—	—	495	455	Amber Valley	Derbyshire
Linby	—	—	—	—	350	Gedling	Nottinghamshire
Papplewick	—	—	—	—	335	Gedling	Nottinghamshire
Risley	—	—	—	—	220	Erewash	Derbyshire
Clifton	—	—	22,312	22,407	—	City of Nottingham	Nottinghamshire
Breaston	—	7,284	7,305	7,545	—	Erewash	Derbyshire
Ruddington	6,504	6,476	6,264	7,020	—	Rushcliffe	Nottinghamshire
West Hallam	—	—	—	6,016	—	Erewash	Derbyshire
Stanton-By-Dale	—	—	—	505	—	Erewash	Derbyshire
Ruddington Grange	—	—	177	196	—	Rushcliffe	Nottinghamshire
Total	593,768	613,726	666,358	729,977	719,400		
Change	-	+3.36%	+8.58%	+9.55%	-1.45%		

Notes:
- Awsworth, Breaston, Denby Common, Ilkeston, Ruddington Grange and West Hallam were independent areas until their inclusion in the table.
- Total of 1981 subdivision figures is 592,888, an additional 880 residents are unaccounted for in the census report total.
- Up to the 2001 census, the Beeston subdivision included Stapleford and was named Beeston And Stapleford.
- Up to the 2001 census, Sandiacre was included as part of the Long Eaton subdivision.
- Up to the 1991 census, the Nottingham subdivision included Clifton.
- In the 2001 census, Stanton-By-Dale was included as part of the Ilkeston subdivision.
Notable settlements of the Nottingham Urban Area

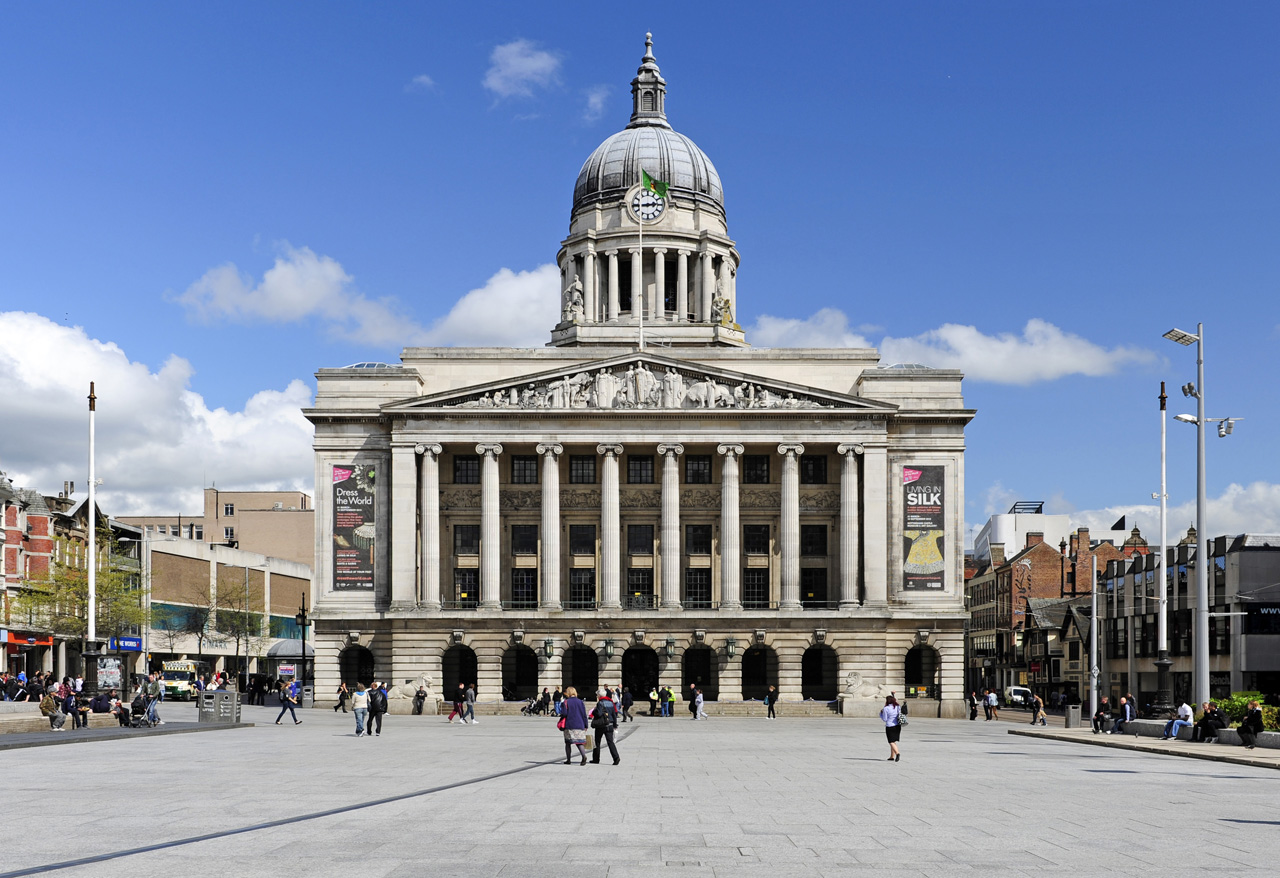
Nottingham Council House

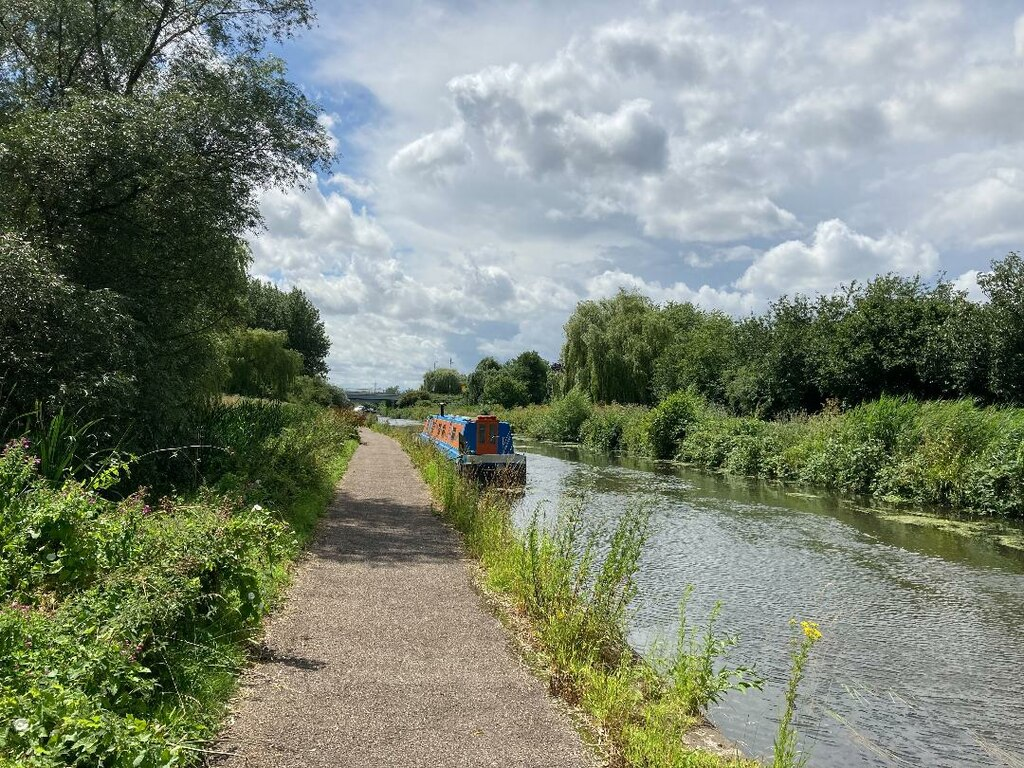
Town Hall, Beeston

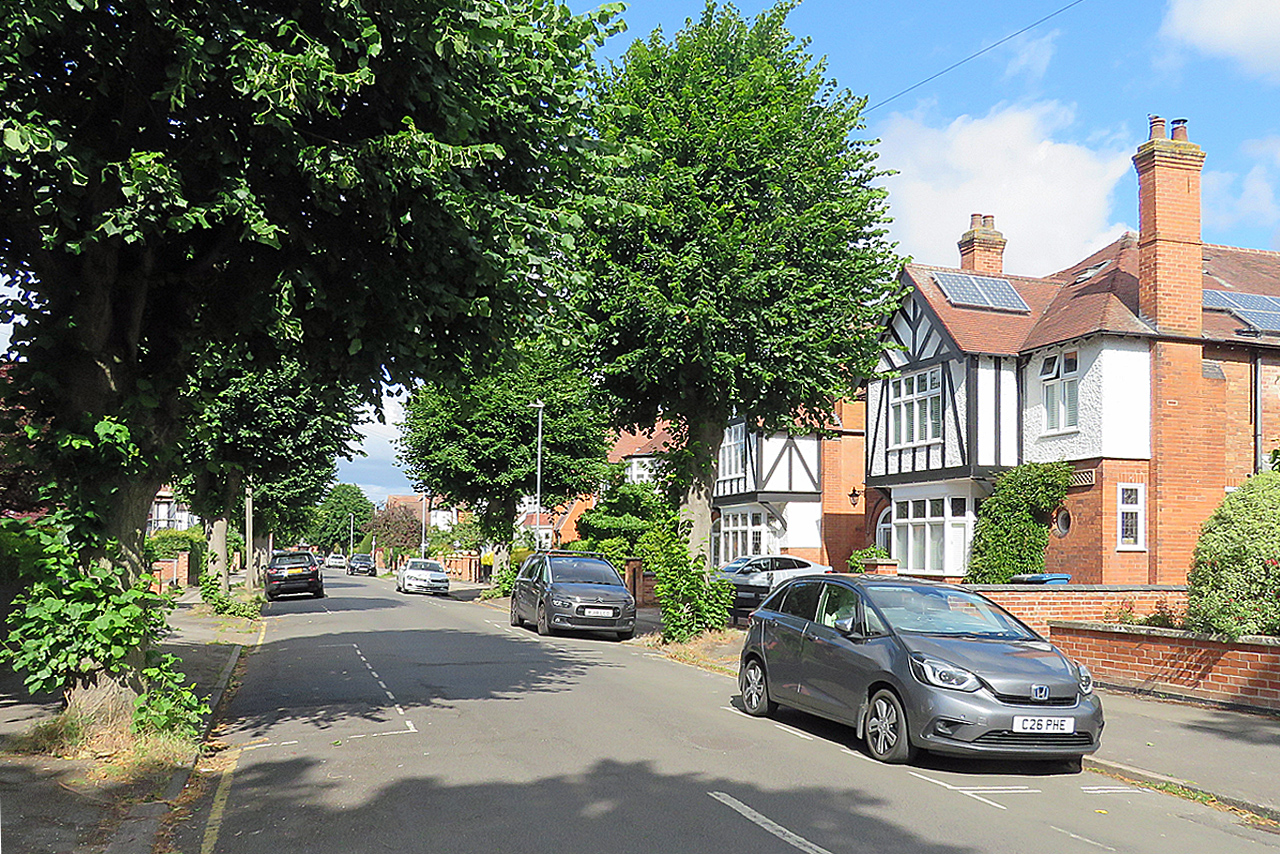
Musters Road, West Bridgford

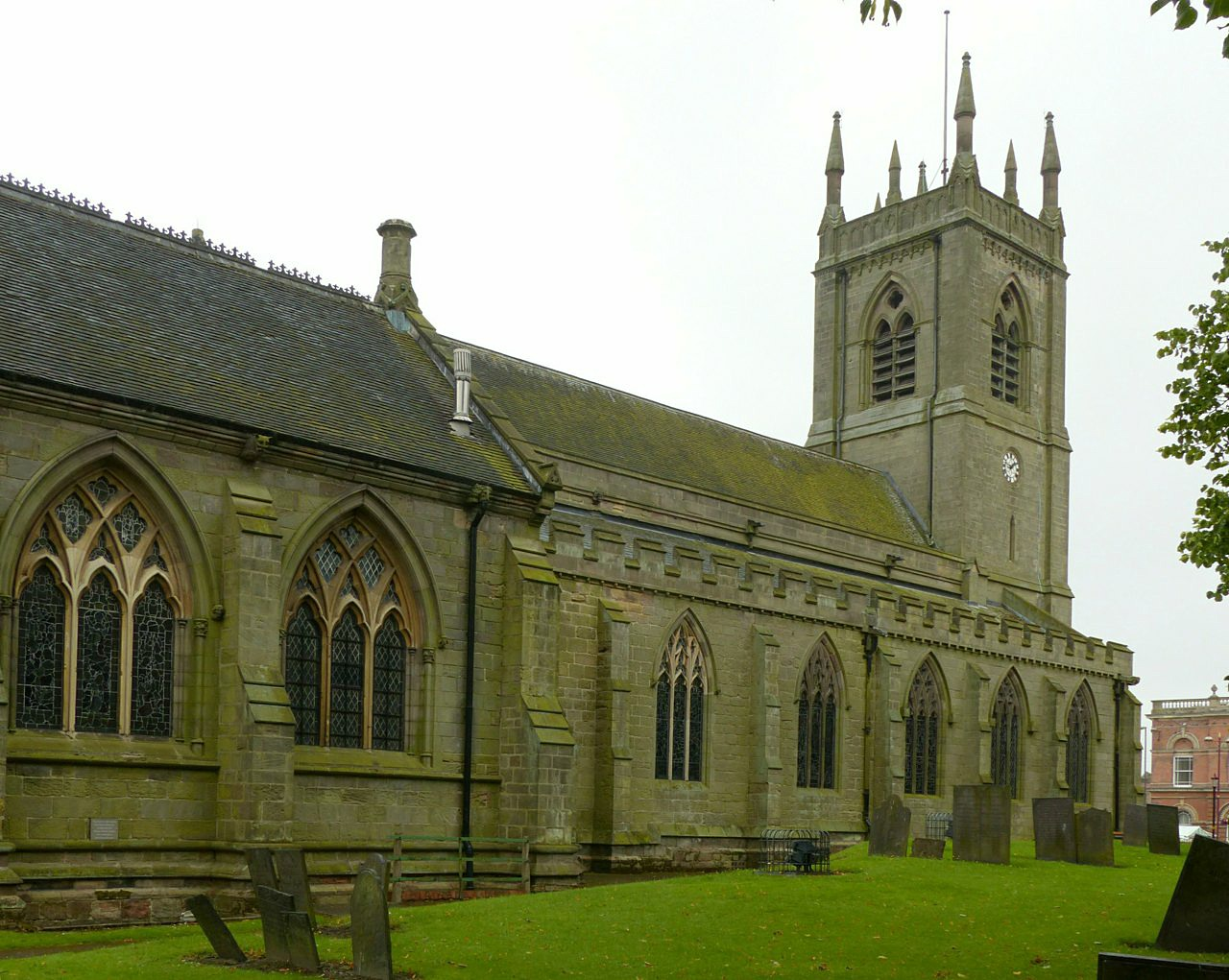
St Mary's Church, Ilkeston

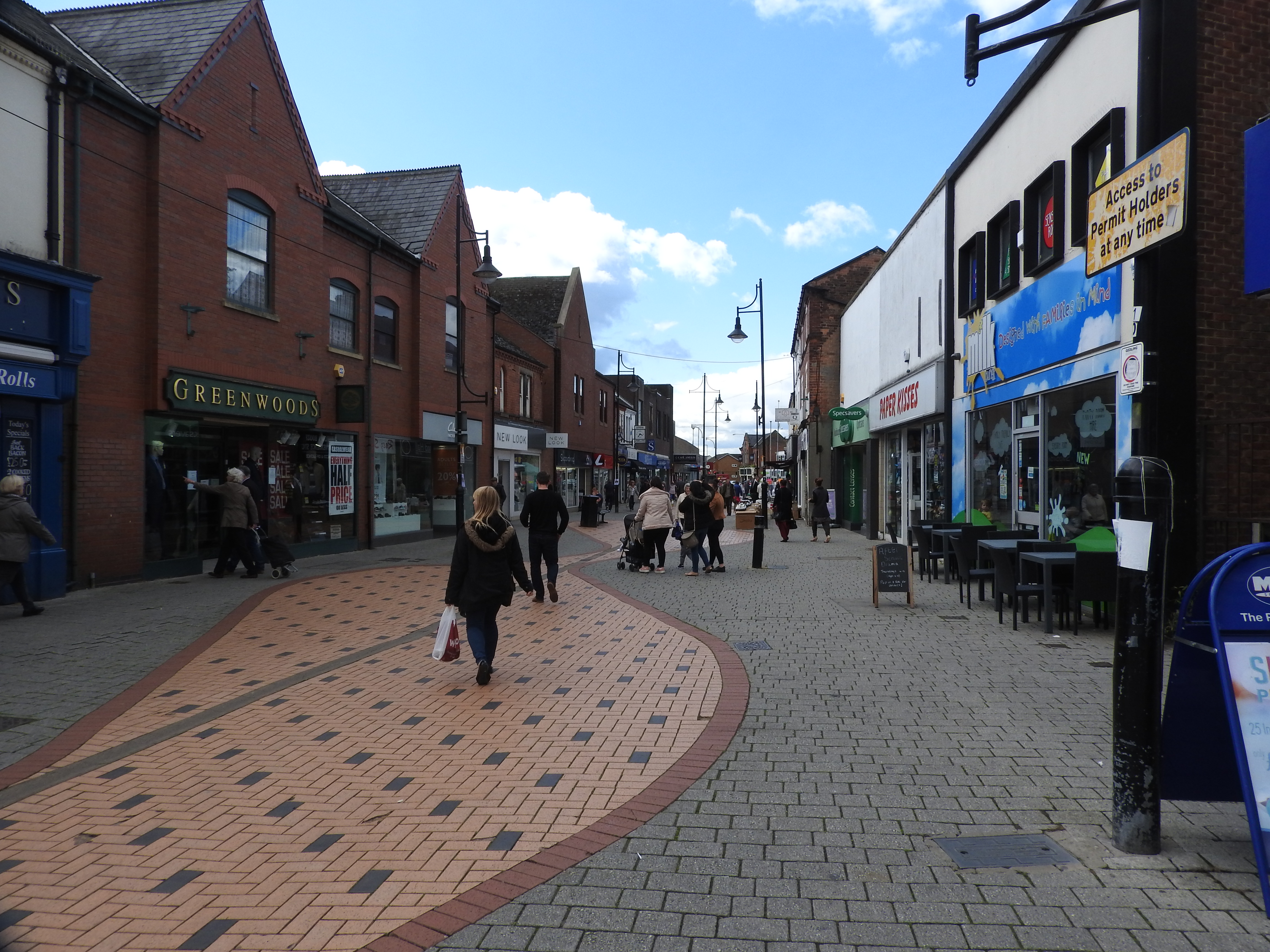
Arnold town centre

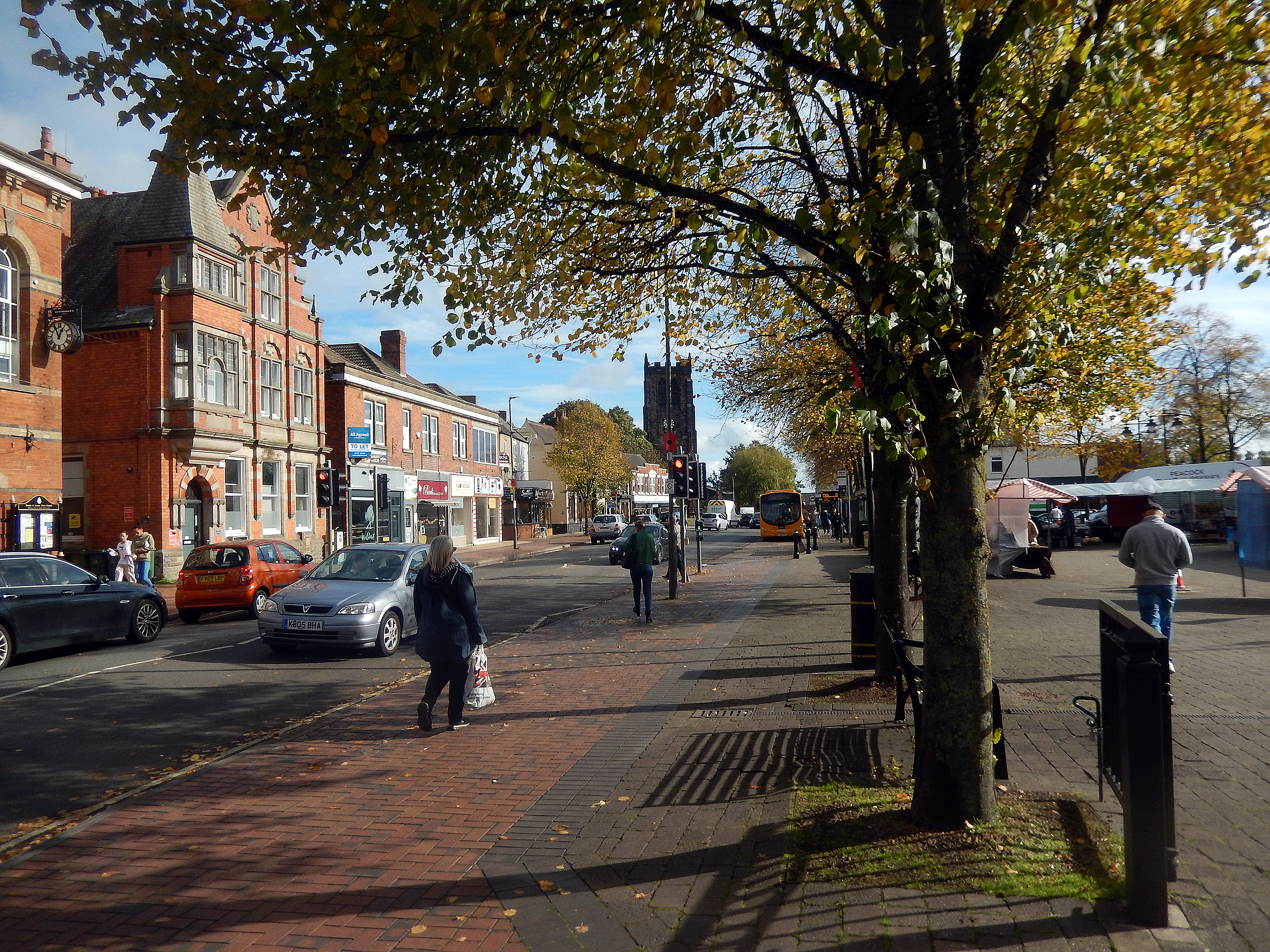
Market Place, Heanor

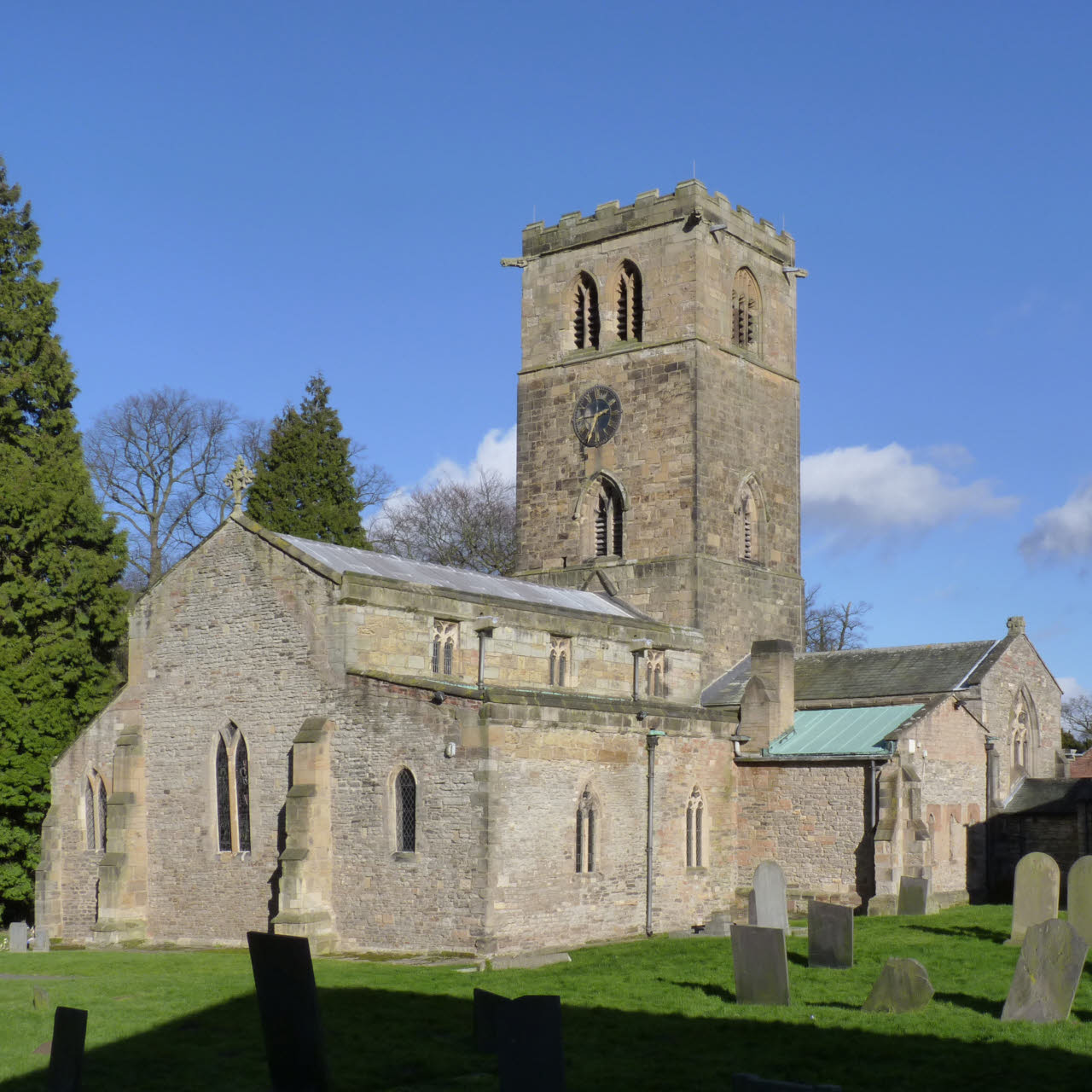
St Mary's Church, Clifton

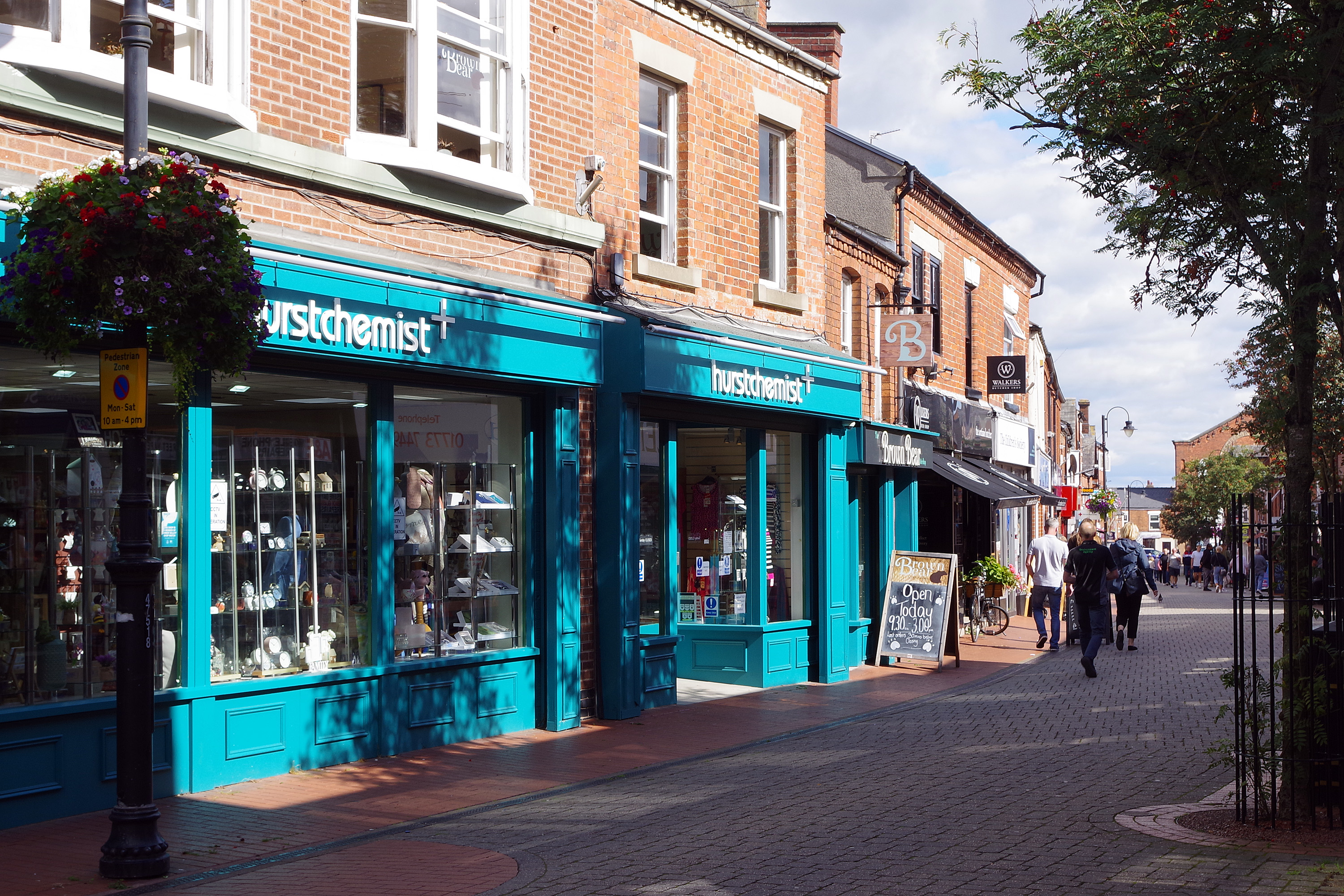
Oxford Street Ripley

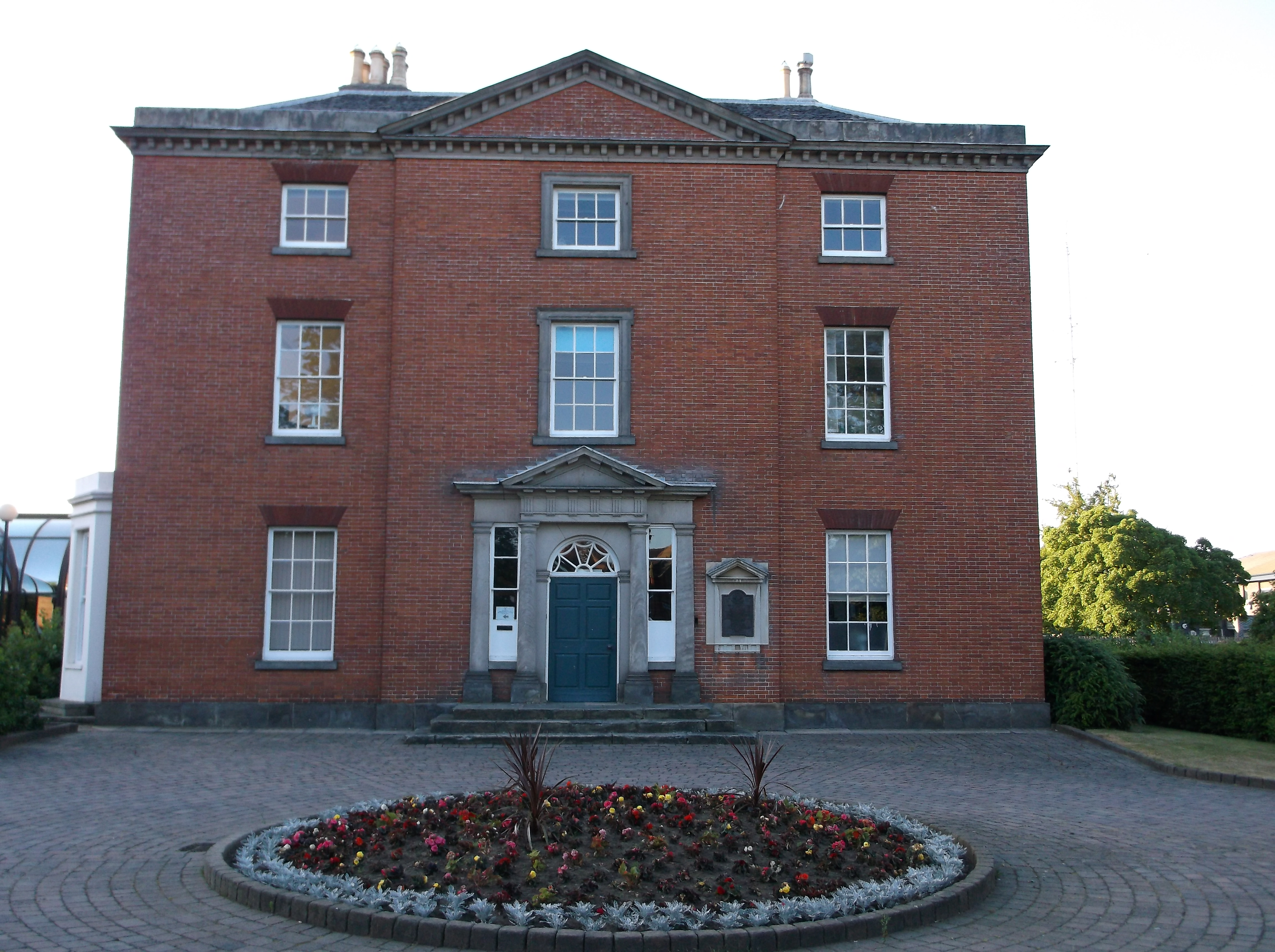
Town Hall Long Eaton

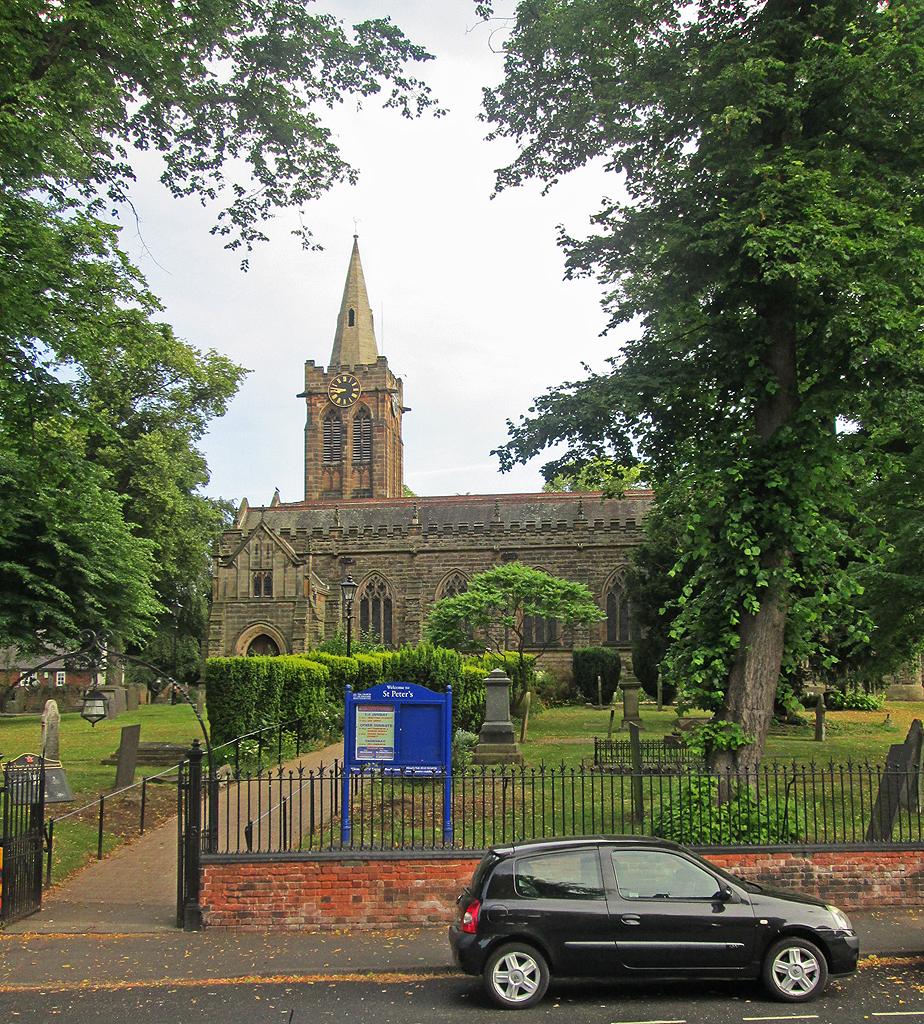
St Peter's Church, Ruddington

== Greater Nottingham Partnership/D2N2 ==
The local authorities collaborate in some ways. The Greater Nottingham Partnership considered Greater Nottingham to consist of the City of Nottingham plus the entirety of the Rushcliffe, Broxtowe and Gedling boroughs, along with Hucknall from Ashfield, but no part of Derbyshire, as no Derbyshire council was a member of the Partnership. They together worked as an advisory and lobbying body for projects and decisions involving the region. However it was axed due to funding in 2011 and the D2N2 Local Enterprise Partnership is instead assuming those functions with cross-county political and local business support.

== Nottingham-Derby 2011 metropolitan area ==
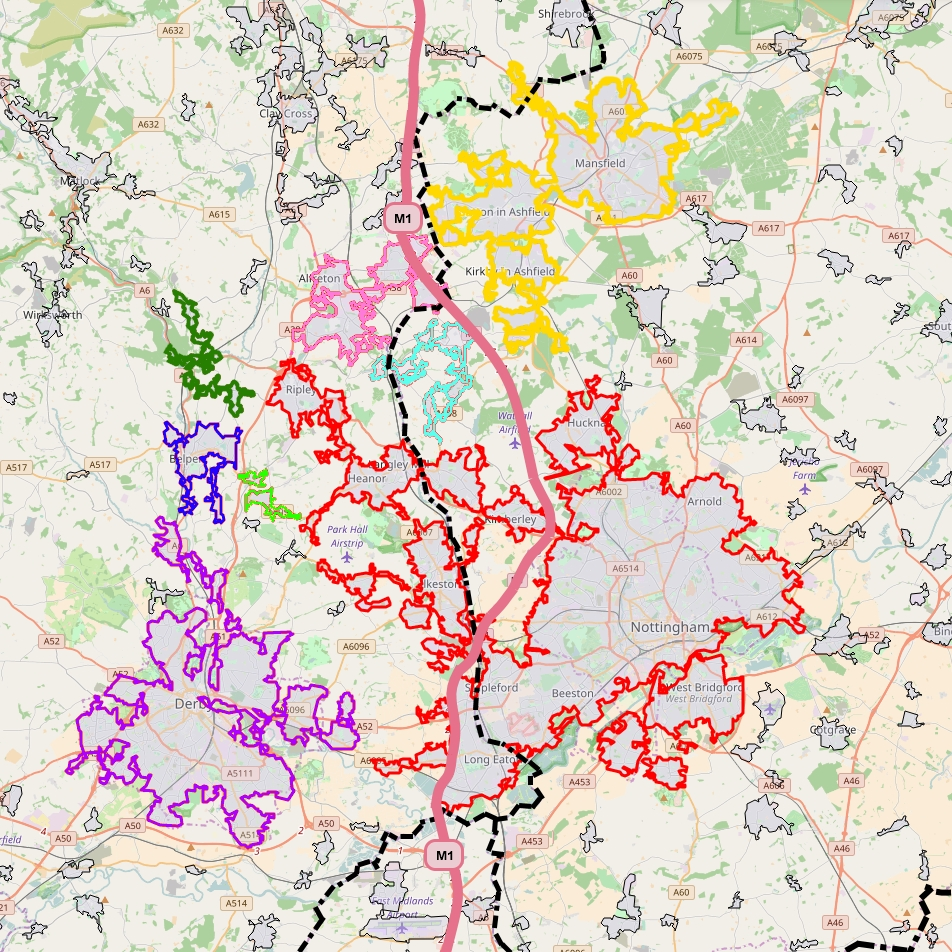
Built-up area boundaries in 2011 showing Nottingham and Derby, with near convergence of surrounding major BUAs: Nottingham Derby Mansfield Alfreton/South Normanton Selston/Brinsley Belper Heage/Crich Kilburn

The conurbation forms a large part of the Nottingham-Derby metropolitan area, which has an estimated population of 1.5 million. The urban areas of both Derby and Nottingham are almost continuous with Draycott (part of the Breaston Urban sub-division) being almost continuous with the Borrowash part of the Derby Urban Area. The Mansfield Urban Area also forms part of this metropolitan area, although it is not continuous with the Nottingham Urban Area. However, it is almost continuous with the Alfreton/South Normanton Built-up area, which had a population of 41,289 according to the last census, with the South Normanton/Pinxton Urban sub-division of the Alfreton Urban Area being almost continuous with the Sutton-in-Ashfield Urban sub-division of the Mansfield Urban Area. The Alfreton Urban Area is also nearly continuous with Ripley part of the Nottingham Urban Area. Other minor urban areas to the west of the Ripley, Heanor and West Hallam sub divisions daisy-chain towards Derby from the north, notably Belper, Kilburn and Crich/Heage. See the maps above for a demonstration of these BUAs in close proximity.

== See also ==
- Derby Built-up area
- Nottingham and Derby Green Belt
- List of conurbations in the United Kingdom
- List of metropolitan areas in the United Kingdom
