= Upper Saxondale =

Village and civil parish in Nottinghamshire, England

Coordinates: 52.945°N 1.004°W

- Village and civil parish
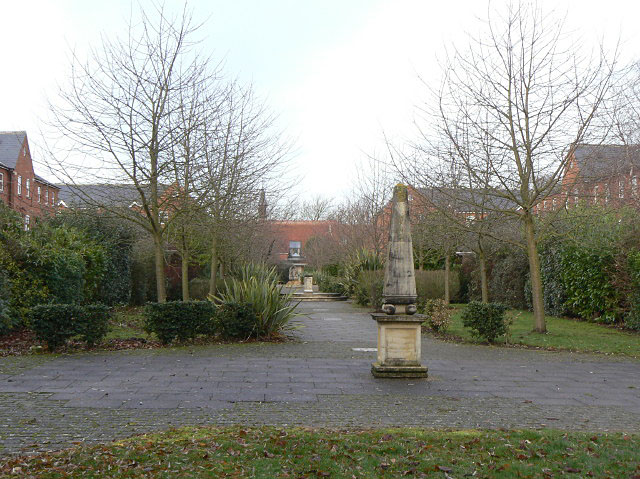
- Millennium Walk

- Location within Nottinghamshire
- Interactive map of Upper Saxondale
- Area: 0.7 sq mi (1.8 km^{2})
- Created: 1 April 2023
- OS grid reference: SK 671392
  - London: 105 mi (169 km) SSE
- District: Rushcliffe
- Shire county: Nottinghamshire
- Region: East Midlands
- Country: England
- Sovereign state: United Kingdom
- Post town: NOTTINGHAM
- Postcode district: NG12
- Dialling code: 0115
- Police: Nottinghamshire
- Fire: Nottinghamshire
- Ambulance: East Midlands
- UK Parliament: Rushcliffe
- Website: http://www.uppersaxondale.com

Upper Saxondale is a village and civil parish in the Rushcliffe district, in the county of Nottinghamshire, England. It lies in an upland area between the River Trent and the Vale of Belvoir, and between the A52 and A46 roads, close to their junction at Saxondale Roundabout near Bingham. The nearby hamlet of Saxondale was the site of an Anglo-Saxon fort and earthworks, visible from the A52. A civil parish for Upper Saxondale was created from portions of Radcliffe-on-Trent and Cropwell Butler parishes, it came into being on 1 April 2023.

== Growth and features ==
Upper Saxondale was developed on the site of the former Saxondale Hospital by David Wilson Homes from about 1995 to 2001. It includes some 350 dwellings, ranging from three-bedroom converted hospital buildings to newly built five to six-bedroom detached houses. There is also a restaurant and bar called Sanctuary, a hairdresser, a tennis club and a bowling green. The estate is surrounded by parkland, much of it owned by Upper Saxondale Residents' Association.

Upper Saxondale has a designated conservation area of 30 hectares (74 acres). The rare flame brocade moth (Trigonophora flammea) has been spotted there. The area boundary encompasses the former Saxondale Hospital site and includes extensive semi-wooded grounds, parkland landscape and fine trees. The chapel was built in 1902 to the designs of E. W. Roberts, then County Architect, for use by hospital staff and patients. The small Gothic Revival building is now home to the Catalyst Church (part of Christian Growth International).

David Wilson Homes originally called the development St James Park, but a change of name to Upper Saxondale was voted at a Residents' Association meeting in 1999. Upper Saxondale also includes original houses in Saxondale Drive, which are not part of the development. The converted Victorian buildings, mature parkland, core of community buildings and public open spaces amount to a residential area of unusual character.

There are several ghost stories relating to the area. One has a troop of Roman soldiers marching up Henson Lane. The ghost of Lady Elinor Denison is said to haunt the grounds.

King Henry VII is said to have camped on land to the west during the Battle of Stoke Field.

A RAF Avro Anson Mk.I bomber crashed close to Upper Saxondale during the Second World War. Both crew were killed. The site is marked by five mature trees set out in the shape of a cross in the middle of a field close to the main Saxondale Drive. The impact made a slight hollow and piles of earth are still clearly visible. The site was marked with a memorial stone, but this has now been removed.
