= Rushcliffe =

Rushcliffe may refer to:

- Borough of Rushcliffe, a district of Nottinghamshire, England
- Rushcliffe (UK Parliament constituency), Nottinghamshire, England
- Rushcliffe Wapentake, Nottinghamshire, England, former administrative area
