= Greater Nottingham Partnership =

The Greater Nottingham Partnership (GNP) was formed in 1994 by Nottingham City Council and Nottinghamshire County Council with the aim of improving partnership working across the Greater Nottingham conurbation and attracting more government regeneration funding into the area.

The GNP represents the conurbation’s local authorities, Ashfield, Broxtowe, Gedling and Rushcliffe besides the original two. It also includes companies, public service agencies, voluntary organisations and community groups with a common interest in developing the economy of the Greater Nottingham area to the benefit of all.

Over the years, the GNP has expanded to include the business, public, voluntary and community sectors, giving birth to the four sector model. It now has a forum of 24 people, representing a broad range of organisations working across the Greater Nottingham area.

The East Midlands Development Agency (EMDA) contacted the GNP to discuss the delivery of the government's regeneration agenda across Greater Nottingham. Consequently, in April 2002 the GNP also became the Sub-regional Strategic Partnership for the Greater Nottingham conurbation.

The GNP was abolished in April 2011 to save money.
