= Edward Drummond-Hay =

Edward Drummond-Hay may refer to:

- Edward Drummond-Hay (antiquarian) (1785–1845), British antiquarian and diplomat
- Edward Drummond-Hay (Royal Navy officer) (1815–1884), British naval officer and colonial administrator
