= Slavery in the British Virgin Islands =

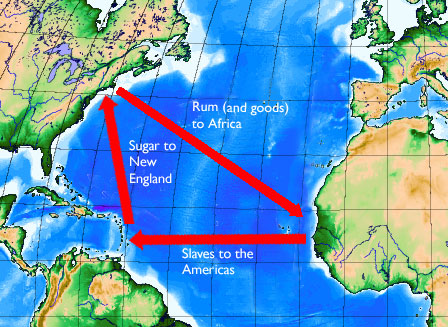
The Triangular trade – slaves were imported into the British Virgin Islands to plant and harvest sugar cane.

In common with most Caribbean countries, slavery in the British Virgin Islands forms a major part of the history of the Territory. One commentator has gone so far as to say: "One of the most important aspects of the History of the British Virgin Islands is slavery."

In 1563, before there had been any European settlement in the British Virgin Islands, Sir John Hawkins visited the islands with a cargo of slaves bound for Hispaniola.

In 1665 the Dutch settlers on Tortola were attacked by a British privateer, John Wentworth, who is recorded as capturing 67 slaves which were removed to Bermuda. This is the first record of slaves actually being kept on Tortola.

The first Dutch settlers also built slave pens at Port Purcell and on Scrub Island. In 1690 the Brandenburgers built slave pens on Peter Island, however, they later abandoned them in favour of an agreement with the Danes to set up a trading outpost on St. Thomas. The Brandenburgers and Dutch were both expelled by the British (although the remains of the pens can still be seen in Great Harbour, Peter Island and on Scrub Island).

== Plantation economy ==
After the Territory came under British control, the islands gradually became a plantation economy. As Tortola and to a lesser extent Virgin Gorda came to be settled by plantation owners, slave labour became economically essential, and there was an exponential growth in the slave population during the early 18th century.

Slaves in the British Virgin Islands
Year	No. of slaves
1717	547
1724	1,430
1756	6,121
1788	≈9,000

Source: Vernon Pickering, A Concise History of the British Virgin Islands

The figure for 1788 arises from a different source, and may possibly be an overestimate. It seems more likely that the total numbers of slaves would remain fairly constant as the agriculture levels on the islands reached a natural level of saturation (there being only a limited amount of flat land in the British Virgin Islands suitable for cultivation). At the time of emancipation, in 1834, there were 5,792 slaves in the British Virgin Islands.

== Treatment of slaves ==
In the British Virgin Islands, slaves were regularly whipped and beaten and sometimes even killed by their enslavers. In 1774, the Territory received its first Legislature, and although this did not in itself assist the slaves (in fact one of the first two laws passed was settling punishments for slaves), it does mark a point in the history of the islands when the treatment of slaves started to improve.

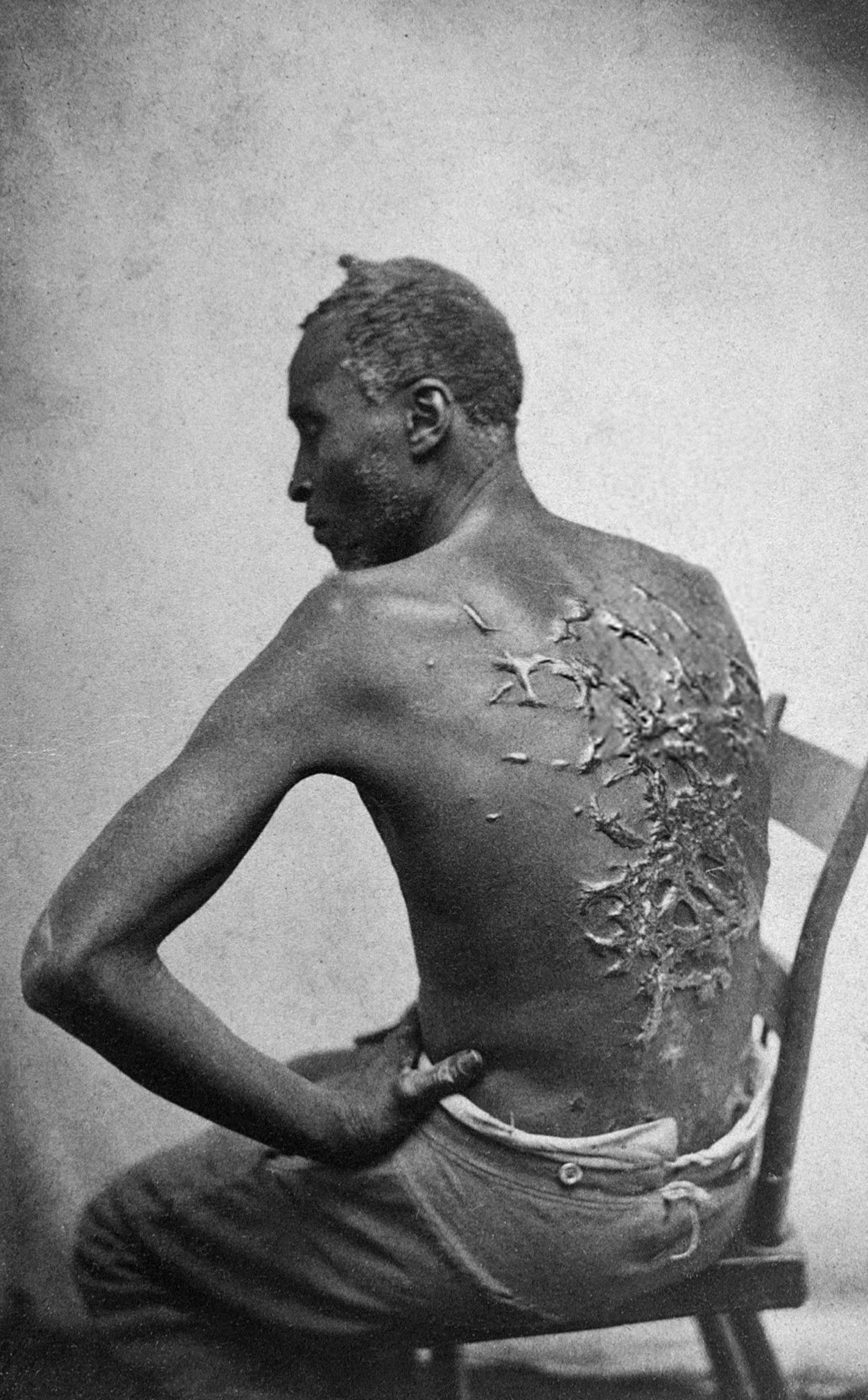
Peter or Gordon, a slave from Louisiana or Mississippi, 1863, whose back had been badly scarred by whipping

=== Prior to 1774 ===
The treatment of slaves was generally extremely harsh, and it appears that the treatment became increasingly harsh as time progressed. Speaking before a Select Committee of the House of Commons in 1790, Thomas Woolrich, who had lived in Tortola, testified that the treatment of slaves was much worse in 1773 than it had been when he arrived, in 1753. When slave numbers had been smaller, slaves had been allowed to tend their own land for food to eat. As they became more numerous (and cheaper) land became more scarce, the slaves more malnourished. Woolrich testified that he "never saw a gang of negroes that appeared anything like sufficiently fed."

Woolrich would also testify that "as the quantity of negroes increased ... punishment of slaves in general ... became more and more severe." The favoured method of punishment was whipping, largely because it left the slave able to continue labour immediately after the infliction of punishment, although other more barbarous practices were employed. The Select Committee also heard that some slaves' backs appeared as "an undistinguishable mass of lumps, holes and furrows by frequent whippings."

The treatment of all slaves was not equal. House slaves were treated considerably better than field slaves. In the field, privileged slaves would be appointed as drivers, but they would protect their position jealously by relentlessly whipping those that they supervised. The laws which were passed to reinforce the social inferiority of slaves applied to both. Slaves could own property, but not other slaves; nor could they cultivate sugar or cotton. Slaves were subject to severe punishments for striking a white person.

=== Subsequent to 1774 ===
After 1774, although conditions were still harsh, a number of things happened which improved the conditions of the slaves.

Throughout the middle part of the 18th century, the Territory had been inhabited by a number of distinguished Quakers, who were fundamentally opposed to slavery. Many, such as John C. Lettsome and Samuel Nottingham freed slaves en masse. Others continued to keep slaves, but treated them more benignly.

After Quakerism began to decline in the Territory, the Methodist mission began to pick up force. Methodists were not opposed to slavery per se, but a number of freed Africans were accepted warmly within the Methodist church, and as a result the church tended to advocate better treatment of enslaved Africans. By 1796 the church had 3,000 black members in its congregation. However, its influence may have been more subtle – the Methodists also provided the first real schooling available to Africans, and the education of slaves and former slaves may have gradually helped their acceptance by white plantation owners as human beings deserving of humane treatment.

When George Suckling, who was appointed as Chief Justice of the Territory, spent 10 years in the Territory from 1778 to 1788, in his letters to London and Antigua he generally had very little to say about British Virgin Islanders that was kind, but he did say that: "they have a tender manner of treating their servants and slaves ... no people are better obeyed in the West Indies than they."

However, it was only after Suckling left that real improvements began to be made. In 1798 the Amelioration Act was passed by the Legislature of the Leeward Islands and applied to the Territory. This, amongst other things, prohibited cruel and unusual punishments for slaves, and set out minimum standards for the feeding and education of slaves.

Then, in 1807 the United Kingdom passed the Slave Trade Act, which prohibited any further trade in slaves. Although the existing slaves were not freed, their owners now had a huge economic incentive to keep them happier and healthier, both so that they would not die (as they could not be replaced), but also in the hopes that they would breed (which was the only possible legal source of new slaves). Although there is evidence that Tortolian planters evaded the law by illegally trading with privateers from St. Thomas, slaves clearly became exponentially more valuable, and were treated accordingly.

Many slave owners adopted voluntary rules relating to the treatment of slaves; the hope was that publishing these rules, they would remove the slave's fear of arbitrary and excessive punishments. A set of these rules from Hannah's Estate was discovered by historians.

In the 1820s Trelawney Wentworth and Fortunatus Dwarris, a colonial agent, also visited the Territory, and both are reported to have commented on the better treatment meted out to slaves in a letter of 1828.

In 1823 the property accumulated by slaves in the British Virgin Islands was valued in aggregate at £14,762, 8 shillings. This included 23 boats, 38 horses and over 4,000 head of cattle, goats and pigs.

There were clear exceptions to this trend however. One Tortolian plantation owner, Arthur William Hodge was notoriously cruel and sadistic towards his slaves, and was eventually executed for murdering his slaves. However, the fact of Hodge's arrest, trial and execution (he was the only British man ever to be hanged for the murder of a slave) also testify to the fact that whereas that sort of treatment may have previously been tolerated or even encouraged, a jury in the British Virgin Islands could no longer accept it.

== Slave revolts ==
Needless to say, the slaves themselves did not view their condition or treatment as remotely benign. Uprisings in the Territory were common, as they were elsewhere in the Caribbean. The first notable uprising occurred in 1790, and centred on the estates of Isaac Pickering; it was quickly put down, and the ring leaders were executed. The revolt was sparked by the rumour that freedom had been granted to slaves by the British Parliament, but that the planters were withholding knowledge of it. The same rumour would later spark subsequent revolts.

Subsequent rebellions also occurred in 1823 (at Pickering's estate, again), in 1827 (at George Nibb's estate) and in 1830 (at the Lettsome estate), although in each case they were quickly put down.

Probably the most significant slave insurrection occurred in 1831 when a plot was uncovered to kill all of the white males in the Territory and to escape to Haiti (which was at the time the only free black republic in the world) by boat with all of the white females. Although the plot does not appear to have been especially well formulated, it caused widespread panic, and military assistance was drafted in from St. Thomas. A number of the plotters (or accused plotters) were executed.

It is perhaps unsurprising that the incidence of slave revolts increased sharply after 1822. In 1807, the slave trade was abolished; although existing slaves continued their servitude, the Royal Navy patrolled the Atlantic freeing cargoes of new slaves being brought from Africa in defiance of the new law. Starting in 1808 hundreds of freed Africans were deposited on Tortola by the Navy, who after serving a 14-year "apprenticeship", were then absolutely free. Naturally seeing free Africans living and working in the Territory caused enormous resentment and jealousy amongst the existing slave population.

Shortly after the free Africans completed their 14-year apprenticeships, the slaves in the Territory were all emancipated by legislation in the United Kingdom, although as outlined below, this did not of itself entirely curtail the insurrections.

== Emancipation ==
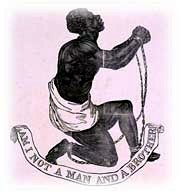
An abolitionist pamphlet from the 1800s

The abolition of slavery occurred on 1 August 1834, and to this day it is celebrated by a three-day public holiday on the first Monday, Tuesday and Wednesday in August in the British Virgin Islands. The original emancipation proclamation hangs in the High Court. However, the abolition of slavery was not the single event that it is sometimes supposed to have been. Emancipation freed a total of 5,792 slaves in the Territory, but at the time of abolition, there were already a considerable number of free blacks in the Territory, possibly as many as 2,000. A number of settlers in the Territory, John C. Lettsome and Samuel Nottingham amongst them, had manumitted large numbers of slaves. Lettsome manumitted 1,000 slaves upon inheriting them. Further, subsequent to the abolition of the slave trade, the Royal Navy deposited a number of freed Africans in the Territory who settled in the Kingston area on Tortola. In January 1808, HMS Cerberus seized the American schooner, the Nancy with a cargo of enslaved Senegalese Africans in the Territory's waters; between August 1814 and February 1815 a further four ships' slave cargoes were seized from the Venus, the Manuella, the Atrevido and the Candelaria and a further 1,318 liberated slaves were deposited on Tortola's shores (of whom just over 1,000 survived). In 1819, a Portuguese slave ship, the Donna Paula, was wrecked upon the reef at Anegada. The ship's crew and 235 slaves were saved from the wreckage. Further Spanish ships, en route to Puerto Rico were reported wrecked on the reef at Anegada in 1817 and 1824, and their cargos settled on Tortola. Although many of these former slaves died due to the appalling conditions that they were kept in during the transatlantic crossing, a large number survived, and had children.

Furthermore, the effect of abolition was gradual; the freed slaves were not absolutely manumitted, but instead entered a form of forced apprenticeship which lasted four years for house slaves and six years for field slaves. Slavery Abolition Act 1833, section 4 The terms of the forced apprenticeship required them to provide 45 hours unpaid labour a week to their former masters, and prohibited them from leaving their residence without the masters permission. The effect, deliberately, was to phase out reliance on slave labour rather than end it with a bang. The Legislative Council of the British Virgin Islands would later legislate to reduce this period to four years for all slaves to quell rising dissent amongst the field slaves. Although, the economics of the abolition of slavery in the British Virgin Islands are difficult to quantify, there was undeniably a considerable impact. Not least the original slave owners suffered a huge capital loss. Although they received £72,940 from the British Government in compensation, this was only a fraction of the true economic value of the manumitted slaves. It is difficult to quantify precisely the value of the freed slaves, but in 1798 the total value of slaves in the British Virgin Islands had been estimated at £360,000. It is likely that figure would have increased considerably during the subsequent 36 years, particularly as the price of slaves rose enormously after the passing of the Slave Trade Act 1807. Equally, whilst they lost the right to "free" slave labour, the former slave owners now no longer had to pay to house, clothe and provide medical attention for their former slaves. The former slaves now usually worked for the same masters, but instead received small wages, out of which they had to pay for the expenses formerly borne by their masters. Whilst some former slaves amassed savings, which clearly demonstrates that in net terms the slave owners were less well off as a result of abolition, it appears that other factors made significant contributions to the Territory's economic decline.

It is true that the Territory went into severe economic decline shortly after abolition of slavery. However, the causes of the decline were numerous. The Territory was rocked by a series of hurricanes; at the time, there was no accurate method of forecasting hurricanes, and their effect was devastating. A particularly devastating hurricane struck in 1837, which was reported to have completely destroyed 17 of the Territory's sugar works, the most lucrative export in the islands. Further hurricanes hit in 1842 and 1852. Two more struck in 1867. The island also suffered severe drought between 1837 and 1847, which made sugar plantation almost impossible to sustain. To compound these miseries, in 1846 the United Kingdom passed the Sugar Duties Act 1846 to equalise duties on sugar grown in the colonies; removing market distortions had the net effect of making prices fall, a further blow to plantation in the British Virgin Islands. By 1848, Edward Hay Drummond Hay, the President of the British Virgin Islands, reported that: "there are now no properties in the Virgin Islands whose holders are not embarrassed for want of capital or credit sufficient to enable them to carry on the simplest method of cultivation effectively." In December 1853 there was a disastrous outbreak of cholera in the Territory, which killed nearly 15% of the population. A total of 942 deaths were recorded out of a total population of 6,919 (13.9%) This was followed by an outbreak of smallpox in Tortola and Jost Van Dyke in 1861.

=== Insurrection ===
However, one of the defining elements of the economic decline of the Territory was the insurrections of 1848 and 1853. The newly freed black population of the British Virgin Islands became increasingly disenchanted that freedom had not brought the prosperity that they had hoped for. Economic decline had led to increased tax burdens, which became a source of general discontent for former slaves and other residents of the Territory alike. In 1848 a major disturbance occurred in the Territory. However, the insurrection of 1853 was a far more serious affair, and would have much graver and more lasting consequences. The most direct cause was the imposition of a head tax on cattle in the Territory, which was imposed on the black rural farmers. With a particularly bad sense of judgment, the tax came into force on the date of the emancipation, and was enforced in an injudicious manner. It has been suggested that rioting could have been avoided if the legislature had been more circumspect in enforcing the legislation by Isaac Dookham in his History of the British Virgin Islands, page 156. All but four of the white population fled, and most plantation houses were burned to the ground. The riots were eventually suppressed with military assistance from St. Thomas, and reinforcements of British troops dispatched by the Governor of the Leeward Islands from Antigua. However, of the plantation owners who had formerly controlled the Territory mostly elected not to return to their ruined and insolvent estates. Realistically, from that point in time, the Territory was almost solely populated by the former slaves who then made up the vast bulk of the population. By 1893, a mere 40 years after the revolts, there were only two white people resident on Tortola – the deputy Governor and the island's doctor.

== See also ==
- Biography and the Black Atlantic
- Centre for the Study of the Legacies of British Slavery
- History of slavery
- List of topics related to Black and African people
- Slavery at common law
- Slavery in the British and French Caribbean
- Triangular trade
