= St Paul's Church, George Street, Nottingham =

Church in Nottinghamshire, England

St. Paul's Church, George Street, Nottingham
- St. Paul's Church, George Street, Nottingham
- 52°57′15″N 1°8′42″W
- Country: England
- Denomination: Church of England
- Churchmanship: Broad Church

History
- Dedication: St. Paul

Architecture
- Architect: William Wilkins
- Style: Greek Revival architecture
- Completed: 1822
- Construction cost: £17,000
- Closed: 1924

Specifications
- Capacity: 1,600
- Length: 104 feet (32 m)
- Width: 62 feet (19 m)
- Height: 34 feet (10 m)

Administration
- Province: York
- Diocese: Diocese of Southwell
- Parish: Nottingham

St. Paul's Church, George Street, was a Church of England church built as a chapel of ease to St. Mary's Church, Nottingham. A Greek Revival building designed by William Wilkins, it was consecrated in 1822 and closed in 1924.

== Background ==
St Paul's was a Commissioners' church. George Wilkins, Vicar of St. Mary's Church. formally applied for a grant in November 1818, but it was not until September 1821 that the money was approved and construction work started.

According to J.H. Walker, writing in 1926:

At the time of the building of this 'St. Paul's Chapel of Ease', as it was then called, public opinion was running high against King George IV for he had refused to allow his wife Caroline to be crowned, notwithstanding this, the King's Coronation was celebrated in Nottingham by the firing of several volleys in the Market Place by the 7th Dragoon Guards, and the Yeomanry Cavalry. The Mayor then invited the officers to join him in drinking his Majesty's health and afterwards the foundation stone was laid by the Revd. George Wilkins, Vicar of St. Mary's Church.

It was consecrated by Edward Venables-Vernon-Harcourt the Archbishop of York on 24 October 1822, and the patron of the living was Charles Pierrepont, 2nd Earl Manvers. The architect was William Wilkins, the brother of the Vicar of St. Mary's, Revd. George Wilkins, and the cost was £14,026 (equivalent to £1,540,780 in 2025).

Originally opened as a Chapel of Ease, it became an independent parish in 1838.

== Architecture ==
The frontage had a Doric portico, its pediment supported on four massive fluted columns, behind which rose a bell turret topped by a cupola. Internally the building measured 104 ft long (32 m), 62 ft wide (19 m) and 34 ft high (10 m), with accommodation for 1853 worshippers.The ceiling of the church was supported by 14 Corinthian columns with pilasters at the angles.A 19th century account of the church describes the arrangement as "nearly resembling a Roman basilica" and calls the columns "well proportioned and beautiful" but notes that "they obstruct many of the congregation from seeing the minister, and are more gorgeous than useful."

== Incumbents ==
- 1839 Charles Armstrong
- 1868 James Hill
- 1880 James Farmer
- 1892 Alfred Whymper (formerly vicar of St James' Church, Standard Hill)
- 1896 George Bishop
- 1906 Henry Biddel (formerly vicar of St Christopher's Church, Sneinton)
- 1918 Ernest Harold Perkins (formerly curate at St. John the Baptist's Church, Leenside, Nottingham)

== Organ ==
The church organ was built by Bevington and Sons of London in 1846 for a cost of £310 (equivalent to £31,250 in 2025).

=== Organists ===
- John M. Wilson 1846 - 1848 (afterwards organist at St Barnabas Catholic Church, Nottingham)
- C.N. Wright ca. 1853 (afterwards organist of Holy Trinity Church, Trinity Square
- Mr. Myers 1862 - 1868 (formerly organist of St Mark's Church, Nottingham)
- G. H. Woodhouse 1878 - 1883 (afterwards organist of All Saints' Church, Nottingham)

== Closure ==
With the population of Nottingham moving out into the suburbs at during the early part of the 20th century, the church became redundant and was closed in 1924. The proceeds from the sale of the site were given by the Diocese of Southwell to the construction of the new building at St. Cyprian's Church, Sneinton.
