= Drummond-Hay =

Drummond-Hay or Drummond Hay is a surname, and may refer to:

- Anneli Drummond-Hay, (1937–2022) Scottish equestrian and trainer
- Edward Hay Drummond Hay (1815–1884), British naval officer, diplomat and colonial administrator
- Grace Marguerite Hay Drummond-Hay (1895–1946), British journalist
- Henry Drummond-Hay (1814–1896), originally Henry Drummond, Scottish naturalist and ornithologist
- John Hay Drummond Hay (1816–1893), United Kingdom Envoy Extraordinary at the Court of Morocco
