= Simon Dawbarn =

Simon Dawbarn may refer to:

- Spike Dawbarn (Simon James Dawbarn), English singer and dancer
- Simon Dawbarn (diplomat), British diplomat
