= Francis Williamson =

Francis Williamson may refer to:

- Francis John Williamson (1833–1920), British portrait sculptor
- Frank S. Williamson (1865–1936), Australian poet
- Francis Williamson (architect) (1822–1883), architect in Nottingham
