= William Pitman =

American slave owner executed for murder

- Born: 1720s King George, Virginia, British America
- Died: May 12, 1775; Williamsburg, Virginia, British America
- Children: 2
- Status: Executed by hanging
- Motive: The victim had forgotten to groom his horse
- Conviction: Murder
- Penalty: Death

William Pitman (died May 12, 1775) was an American slave owner who was executed for murdering one of his own slaves. The case was one of the rare instances in the Americas in which a white person was executed for the murder of a black slave.

== Early life ==
Pitman had made several appearances in Virginia courts since the 1750s.

== Murder ==
In 1775, Pittman, a man in his late 40s or early 50s, was charged with murdering one of his slaves during a drunken rage. After a day of horse riding, Pitman, who had several drinks beforehand, flew into a rage after realizing that his teenage slave had not groomed his horse as he had asked. He confronted the boy, who was sleeping in the stable with the horse's blanket wrapped around him. He tied the boy up and then beat him to death. Pitman was arrested and charged with murder. Although blacks were not allowed to serve as witnesses at the time, he was found guilty after his own son and daughter testified against him in court. The Virginia Gazette summarized the case on April 21, 1775.

"The evidences against William Pitman were his own son and daughter, by whom it appeared that their father, in the heat of passion, and when in liquor, had, for some trifling offence, tied his poor negro boy by the neck and heels, beat him most cruelly with a large grape vine, and then stamped him to death. This man has justly incurred the penalties of the law and we hear will certainly suffer; which ought to be a warning to others to treat their slaves with moderation, and not give way to unruly passions that may bring them to an ignominious death and involve their families in their unhappy fates."

After the Virginia Governor's Council declined to intervene, Pitman was hanged in Williamsburg on May 12, 1775. The Gazette reported on the execution.

"Pitman made some resistance, but was soon overpowered; he behaved with decency at the place of execution, and attributed his unhappy fate to be the effect of intemperate drinking."

== See also ==
- List of white defendants executed for killing a black victim
- Arthur William Hodge
