= List of ambassadors of the United Kingdom to Morocco =

The ambassador of the United Kingdom to Morocco is the United Kingdom's foremost diplomatic representative in Morocco, and head of the UK's diplomatic mission there. The official title is His Britannic Majesty's Ambassador to the Kingdom of Morocco.

The British ambassador to Morocco was also non-resident ambassador to the Islamic Republic of Mauritania from 1990 until the United Kingdom appointed a resident ambassador to Mauritania in 2018. The Morocco embassy also covers Western Sahara, a disputed territory with which the UK does not have official diplomatic relations.

Besides the embassy in Rabat, the British government maintains a consulate general in Casablanca and an honorary consulate in Marrakesh.

== Heads of mission ==
=== Ambassadors ===
- John Harrison (1610, 1613, 1615 and 1627)
- ?: William Rainsborough
- 1679: Henry Howard, 6th Duke of Norfolk
- 1681: Sir James Leslie
- 1721: The Hon. Charles Stewart

=== Ministers ===
- 1829-1845: Edward Drummond-Hay (Consul-general)
- 1845–1886: Sir John Drummond-Hay (1845 Agent and Consul-General, 1856 Chargé d'Affaires, 1860 Minister Resident, 1872 Minister Plenipotentiary, 1880 Envoy Extraordinary and Minister Plenipotentiary)
- 1886–1891: Sir William Kirby Green (Envoy Extraordinary and Minister Plenipotentiary)
- 1891–1893: Sir Charles Euan-Smith (Envoy Extraordinary and Minister Plenipotentiary)
- 1893–1895: Ernest Satow (Envoy Extraordinary and Minister Plenipotentiary)
- 1895–1904: Sir Arthur Nicolson (Envoy Extraordinary and Minister Plenipotentiary)
- 1905–1908: Gerard Lowther (Envoy Extraordinary and Minister Plenipotentiary)
- 1908–1912: Sir Reginald Lister (Envoy Extraordinary and Minister Plenipotentiary)
- 1912–1956: Morocco under French protectorate

=== Ambassadors ===
- 1956–1957: Harold Freese-Pennefather
- 1957–1961: Sir Charles Duke
- 1961–1965: Sir Richard Beaumont
- 1965–1969: Leonard Holliday
- 1969–1971: Thomas Shaw
- 1971–1975: Ronald Bailey
- 1975–1978: John Duncan
- 1978–1982: Simon Dawbarn
- 1982–1984: Sydney Cambridge
- 1985–1987: Robin Byatt
- 1987–1990: John Shakespeare
- 1990–1992: John Macrae
- 1992–1996: Sir Allan Ramsay
- 1996–1999: William Fullerton
- 1999–2002: Anthony Layden
- 2002–2005: Haydon Warren-Gash
- 2005–2008: Charles Gray
- 2008–2012: Timothy Morris
- 2012–2015: Clive Alderton
- 2015–2017: Karen Elizabeth Betts
- 2017–2020: Thomas Reilly
- 2020–present: Simon Martin
