= St Christopher's Church, Sneinton =

- The Church of St. Christopher with St. Philip, Sneinton
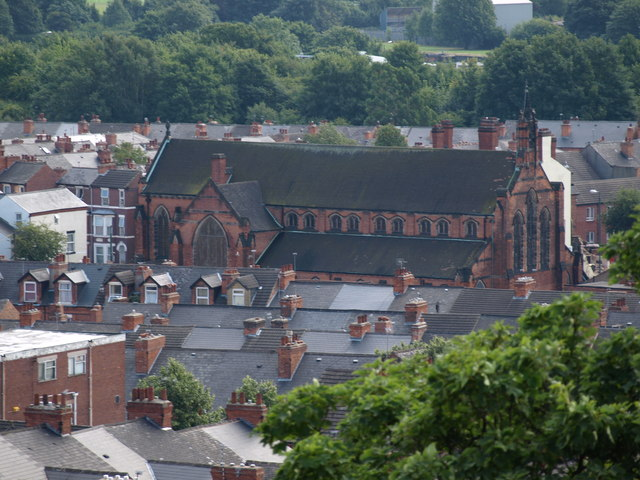
- St Christopher's Church, Sneinton
- 52°57′00″N 1°7′29″W
- Country: England
- Denomination: Church of England
- Churchmanship: Open Evangelical
- Website: achurchnearyou.com/sneinton-st-christopher

History
- Founded: Church of England
- Dedication: St. Christopher
- Consecrated: 1 December 1910

Architecture
- Architect: Frank Edwin Littler
- Groundbreaking: 1909
- Completed: 1910
- Construction cost: £7,000 (equivalent to £712,900 in 2025)

Administration
- Province: York
- Diocese: Diocese of Southwell
- Parish: Sneinton

St Christopher's Church, Sneinton is a Church of England church in Sneinton Nottingham.

== History ==
The church was built on the site of a former iron mission church and school. The school room was 46 feet (14 m) long and 20 feet (6.1 m) wide. It was moved on rollers to make room for the building of the new church. The building was loosened from its foundations and beams fixed underneath. The structure was raised by hydraulic jacks and placed on rollers and moved 40 feet (12 m) by a team of 17 men. Two weeks later the iron church was moved using the same technique. The church was estimated to weigh between 60 and 80 tons, and measured 84 feet (26 m) and 40 feet (12 m) wide. The pews, organ and fittings were left intact and the church moved 70 feet (21 m).

The new church was built in the early Decorated Gothic style with two side aisles and north and south transepts. It was consecrated by Rt. Revd. Edwyn Hoskyns the Bishop of Southwell on 1 December 1910. It replaced a tin church which had been opened in 1902 on the same site. It became the main church for St Christopher's, from the original church built on Meadow Lane, near Trent Bridge in 1885, which was retained as a mission church.

The church was badly damaged in the air raid on Nottingham on 8 and 9 May 1941 (the same raid which destroyed St. John the Baptist's Church, Leenside, Nottingham nearby). Only the walls were left standing. Until restoration work was completed in 1952, the church joined with St. Philip's Church, Pennyfoot Street, and when St. Philip's Church was demolished in 1963, its name was joined with that of St. Christopher's. The original church on Meadow Lane was destroyed in the same air raid that damaged the main building.

A full history of the church can be found on the Southwell DAC Church History Project website.

== Organ ==
The two manual pipe organ dates from the rebuilding of the church in 1953 and is by Cousans of Lincoln. The reeds were voiced by Billy Jones. A specification of the organ can be found on the National Pipe Organ Register.
