= Arthur William Hodge =

Tortolan planter, politician and serial killer

- Born: 1763; Tortola, British Virgin Islands
- Died: 8 May 1811 (aged 48); Tortola Prison, Tortola, British Virgin Islands
- Cause of death: Execution by hanging
- Status: Executed
- Conviction: Murder
- Penalty: Death

Details
- Victims: 60+
- Span of crimes: Unknown–1811
- Country: British Virgin Islands
- Location: Tortola
- Target: Slaves
- Date apprehended: 11 March 1811

Arthur William Hodge (c. 1763 – 8 May 1811) was a Tortolan planter, politician, and serial killer who was executed by hanging in 1811 for murdering one of his slaves. Born in the British Virgin Islands, Hodge studied at Oriel College, Oxford, matriculating in 1781 before briefly serving as an officer in the 23rd Regiment of Foot (Royal Welsh Fuzileers). Returning to Tortola in 1803, he settled down to a life as a plantation owner while also pursuing a political career, serving in both the colony's Executive Council and its Legislative Assembly. In 1811, Hodge was hanged after being found guilty of murdering a slave he owned, the first British subject to be executed for such a crime.

== Early life ==
Arthur William Hodge was born in the British Virgin Islands, the son of Arthur Hodge of Tortola. He studied at Oriel College, Oxford, matriculating in December 1781. He briefly served in the British Army, being commissioned as a second lieutenant in the 23rd Regiment of Foot (Royal Welsh Fuzileers) on 3 December 1782. One of his three wives, Ann Hoggins (1779–1808), was a sister-in-law of the Marquess of Exeter. He was described as a man of great accomplishments and elegant manners. After his father's death in 1803, Hodge returned to Tortola to assume control of the family's plantation at Belle Vue.

In 1811, Hodge was indicted for the murder of a single male slave, part of his estate, named Prosper. Restrictions on similar fact evidence were relatively casual in colonial courts, and much of the evidence seems to have focused upon acts of cruelty by Hodge towards slaves other than Prosper.

Trial reports suggest that Hodge was a sadistic and disturbed man. Evidence was presented that he caused the deaths of other slaves in his estate, including: Cuffy, Else, Jupiter, Margaret, and Tom and Simon Boiler. Three male slaves—Jupiter, Tom Boiler and his brother Simon—were whipped to death. Cook Margaret and washerwoman Else died after boiling water was poured down their throats. Other slaves named Welcome, Gift and Violet were also flogged to death. At least one free black man, named Peter, was also flogged while working on Hodge's estate and later died, allegedly as a result of his severe treatment.

Evidence was further presented that Hodge was cruel to child slaves, including his own offspring. Bella, a small mulatto girl of about eight years of age, who was his offspring by his slave Peggy, was flogged and beaten by Hodge personally. Hodge also had the heads of several mulatto children, possibly also sired by him, held under water until they lost consciousness, then had them revived only to repeat the process. Sampson, a boy of ten years of age, was dipped in boiling liquor until all his skin peeled off.

Hodge previously had over 100 healthy slaves on his plantation, but by the time his wife Ann died in 1808, it was testified that there were no longer enough slaves to dig a grave for her. One witness testified that, in three years at least sixty "Negroes" had been buried, and only one had died a natural death.

== The crime ==
Hodge had a reputation in Tortola for cruelty towards slaves. The main evidence given at the trial relating to the death of Prosper was given by Perreen Georges, a free woman of colour. She testified that:

I was present when he [Prosper] was laid down and flogged for a mango which dropt [sic] off a tree, and which Mr Hodge said he should pay six shillings for; he had not the money and came to borrow it of me, I had no more than three shillings; he said to his master that he had no more money; his master said he would flog him if he did not bring it; he was laid down and held by four negroes, on his face and belly, and flogged with a cartwhip; he was under the last better than an hour; he then got up and was carried up to the hill; and his master said he should be flogged again if he did not bring the other three shillings; he was tied to a tree the next day; and the flogging was repeated; he was licked so long that his head fell back, and he could not bawl out any longer; I supposed he was faint; I then went from the window, as I could not bear to see any more of it.

The assaults took place on 2 October 1807 and the following day. Thirteen days later, on 15 October 1807, Prosper died of his wounds. Hodge was not indicted for three years, until 11 March 1811. He then fled from his estates and was arrested by warrant.

== The trial ==
The evidence against Hodge was strong and credible, and Hodge's defence was weak. The two strongest prosecution witnesses were Stephen McKeough, a white man who inspected the Hodge estate, and Perreen Georges. Hodge tried to discredit both witnesses by alleging that McKeough was a drunk and Georges was a thief. Hodge did not try to impeach the reputation of the third prosecution witness, Daniel Ross, a Justice of the Peace. Hodge called his sister, Penelope, and a witness described as an "old black woman" to give testimony to his innocence, but reports suggest that their evidence was not regarded as credible.

As is customary in common law legal systems, the defendant was allowed to address the jury before they retired to consider their verdict, and Hodge said this:

As bad as I have been represented, or as bad as you may think me, I assure you that I feel support in my afflictions from entertaining a proper sense of religion. As all men are subject to wrong, I cannot but say that the principle is likewise inherent in me. I acknowledge myself guilty in regard of many of my slaves, but I call God to witness to my innocence in respect to the murder of Prosper. I am sensible that the country thirsts for my blood, and I am ready to sacrifice it.

However, the jury were also charged with the words of Richard Hetherington, President of the Council of the Territory:

...the law makes no distinction between master and servant. God created white and he created black creatures; and as God makes no distinction in administering justice, and to Him each is alike, you will not, nor can you alter your verdict, if murder has been proved – whether on white persons or on black persons, the crime is equally the same with God and the law.

On 30 April 1811, the jury retired to consider their verdict at about half past six in the morning. By eight o'clock, they returned with a guilty verdict. A majority of the jurors recommended mercy for Hodge. Such recommendations were not binding, and the presiding judge, Chief Justice Robertson, pronounced that Hodge should be "hanged by the neck on Wednesday the 8 May following, until he was dead, on a spot near unto the common prison."

== The execution ==
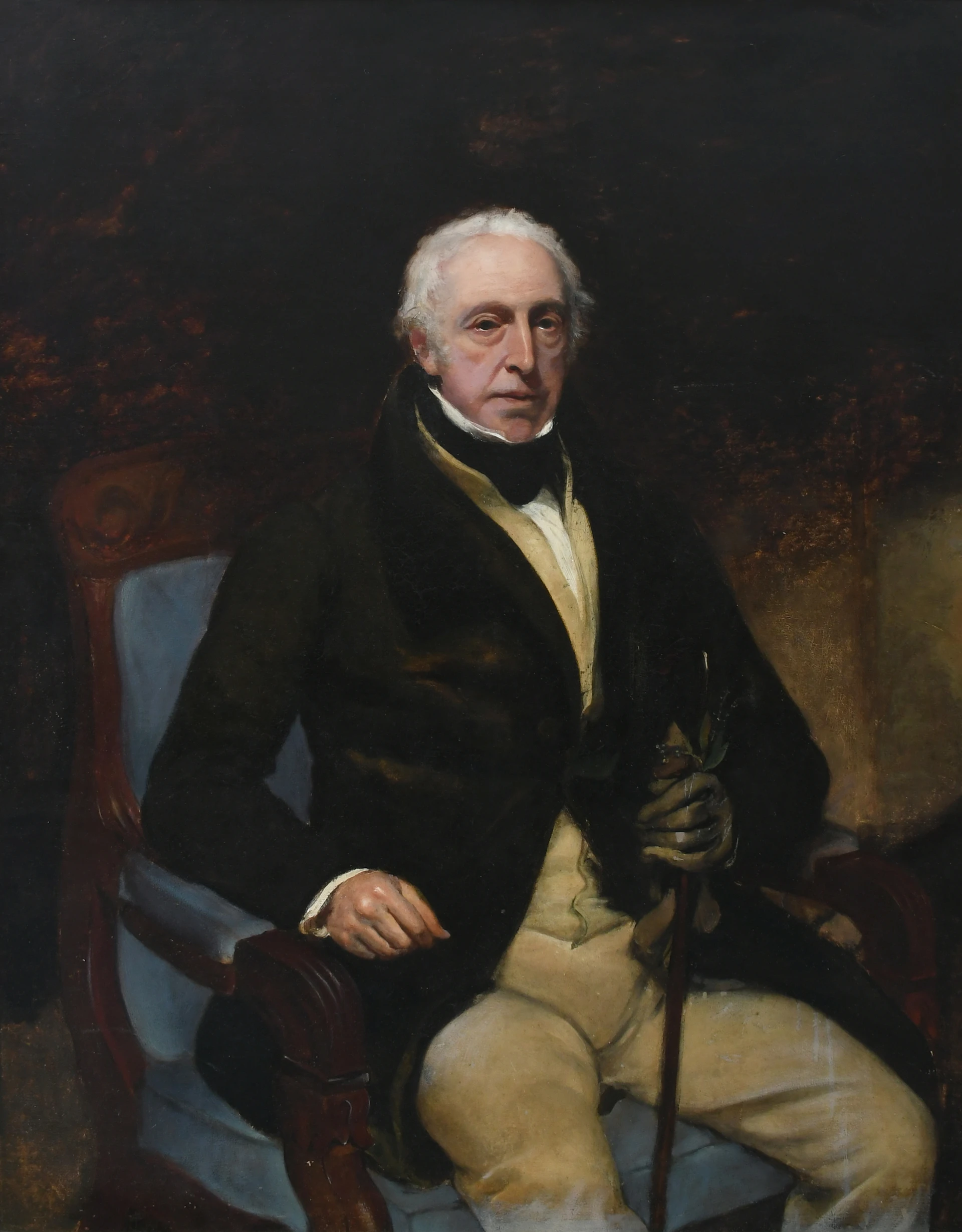
Hugh Elliot, the primary driving force behind Hodge's execution

The governor of the Leeward Islands, Hugh Elliot, was compelled to commission a militia to prevent reprisals "in a conjuncture so replete with party animosity." He also imposed martial law every night from sunset to sunrise between the time of sentencing and the date of Hodge's execution. Finally, he ordered HMS Cygnet to stand by to support the civilian authorities if it was needed. Elliot may have been motivated by a concern for self-preservation, as he had been the primary proponent of the indictment of Hodge. White slaveowners might have been angry that a social peer could be sentenced to death for the murder of a black slave, who by the laws of the time was considered property.

Hodge was allowed to "make his peace with God" in the following week. He was attended by two ministers of the Methodist church at Saint Kitts. On the appointed day, he addressed certain individuals whom he singled out in the crowd and asked them to forgive him for injuries which they had received at his hands. He then addressed the crowd generally and asked them to forgive him. Then he was hanged and his body was taken to his estate and buried, not far from the grave of Prosper.

== The law ==
At the time of Hodge's trial, slavery was still legal, but the trade in African slaves had been abolished by the Slave Trade Act 1807. Enslaved Africans were not formally freed until the Slavery Abolition Act 1833.

While some slave owners prescribed rules of conduct for the disciplining of slaves to remove fear of arbitrary or excessive punishments, these rules were not binding in law. During his unsuccessful bail application, Hodge's counsel argued that "A Negro being property, it was no greater offence for his master to kill him than it would be to kill his dog," but the court did not accept the submission. Indeed, the point was dismissed without any serious discussion.

The boundaries of the legality of slavery were barely explored under the common law, and it does not seem implausible that slavery could be permitted under the common law on the one hand, but for it to constitute a crime to kill a slave on the other. In 1792 the captain of a slave ship, John Kimber, had stood trial in England for murdering a slave but was acquitted; it was not suggested at Kimber's trial that it was lawful to kill a slave. Many cases dealing with the status of slaves are well documented and well considered (see generally, slavery at common law). Hodge did not have an opportunity to appeal his conviction in the eight days before execution.

=== Other jurisdictions ===
The case is also sometimes compared with North Carolina v. Mann, 13 N.C. 167 (N.C. 1830), in which the Supreme Court of North Carolina ruled that slave-holders could not be convicted for harming their slaves.

== Motivations for prosecution ==
Hodge may have been sentenced to hang for political reasons:

- Several slave uprisings occurred in the British Virgin Islands before the trial, including a major one in May 1790 at the Pickering plantation. Hanging a notoriously cruel slave owner might have been intended to help maintain control of the remaining slave population, who had grown restless as a result of the passing of the Slave Trade Act. If this was the intent, it was not effective, as major rebellions broke out in 1823 and in 1830, and a planned uprising was uncovered in 1831.
- The Governor of the British Leeward Islands, Hugh Elliot, was an abolitionist. Elliot personally supervised the proceedings against Hodge, but since the trial was conducted before an independent judge with a sitting jury, it is unlikely he could have influenced its outcome. He was aware that the economy of the British Virgin Islands might collapse without slave labour. Nearly three years elapsed from the murder without anyone choosing to indict Hodge until Elliot was appointed governor.
- The third reason is that the British Virgin Islands were considered to be beset by lawlessness at the time. Elliot was reported to have been struck by the "state of irritation ... almost of anarchy" in the British Virgin Islands. Arresting a significant local figure like Hodge, putting him on trial, and executing him was a decisive demonstration of authority in an attempt to restore better legal order.

And finally, personal feuds may have played a role in indicting Hodge. William Cox Robertson was a young man who had returned to Tortola and become engaged in a three way exchange of insults between himself, Hodge and George Martin (Robertson's father may have been killed by Hodge in a duel).) During the series of arguments, Martin went to Hodge's house on 3 January 1811 "and there most wantonly insulted and assaulted him" according to court records, before doing the same thing to Robertson later that day. Hodge then made "half-uttered threats of calling [him] out", i.e. challenging him to a duel. Martin decided that "it better not to fight him, without first attempting to deliver himself from such a desperate enemy, by bringing him to public justice" since Hodge was known to be an excellent pistol shot and duellist.

== Ramifications ==
The ramifications of the execution of Hodge are difficult to gauge. Some historians suggest that the "case stirred up feverish feelings in the islands, and even echoed to the outside world ... it was revolutionary for the times: this was an unprecedented trial, where a white man was proven guilty for the murder of a black man and sentenced to death." While the trial and execution may have shocked the slave-owning communities in the British West Indies, it does not appear to have had any immediate effect other than that on Hodge's plantation. There may have been other slave owners in the British West Indies who were as cruel as Hodge, but there does not seem to have been a move to put them on trial. And white slave owners do not appear to have voluntarily moderated their treatment of their black slaves after the trial. There appear to be no other records of any slave owners in the British West Indies being tried for the murder of their slaves.

Within the British Virgin Islands themselves, outside Hodge's estate, slaves were treated relatively well, which is not surprising in light of the growing value of slaves since the abolition of the African slave trade. While slaves would not be free until over twenty years had passed, enslaved people in the British Virgin Islands enjoyed greater protection from cruelty and injury by white slave owners.

Trying Hodge affected the British Virgin Island's finances. The British Virgin Islands spent nearly six hundred pounds sterling, and cost Hodge's estate nearly nine hundred pounds sterling, both extravagant sums for the time.

== Descendants ==
After delivering the verdict in his trial, all of the jurors swore that to their knowledge Arthur Hodge held no property in the British Virgin Islands. This was patently not true, but allowed the court to avoid condemning his property, and allowed his estate to pass to his 7-year-old son, Henry Cecil Hodge. Arthur Hodge had adopted a new will leaving his estate to his son during the disputes with Musgrave and Martin which led to his execution, although there is no suggestion that he feared for his life at this time.

Years later the Hodge estate burned down, and son Henry Cecil Hodge remarked that he would be paying the price for his father's sins forever. Arthur Hodge had also two daughters Jane (b. 1801) and Ruth (b. 1806) with Ann Hoggins. With Jane MacNamara he had a daughter Rosina Jane (b. 1795). With slave Peggy he had a girl named Bella (c. 1798).

No white descendants of Hodge live in the British Virgin Islands today, although many of the descendants of his former slaves still do so. There are Hodges of mixed race descended from white Hodges.

== See also ==
- Samuel Hodge VC (c. 1840 – 1868)
- William Pitman
- List of slave owners
