= Public holidays in the British Virgin Islands =

Holidays in the British Virgin Islands are predominantly religious holidays, with a number of additional national holidays. The most important holiday in the Territory is the August festival, which is celebrated on the three days from (and including) the first Monday in August to commemorate the abolition of slavery in the British Virgin Islands.

Where fixed date holidays (such as Christmas Day and Boxing Day) fall on a weekend, the holiday is normally taken in lieu on the next succeeding working day. However, in 2010 when Christmas Day fell on a Saturday and Boxing Day fell on a Sunday, only one day off was given in lieu. An official explanation offered by the Attorney General's department was that because those two days are both "common law holidays" and not statutory holidays, both of them were deferred to the same date – the next Monday. The position taken by the Attorney General was somewhat surprising, as it differed with the common law position expressed to be taken in the United Kingdom.

Date	Name	Remarks
1 January	New Year's Day	
7 March	Lavity Stoutt's Birthday	A day of recognition for the longest serving Chief Minister of the British Virgin Islands
Good Friday	Friday before Easter	
Easter Monday	Monday after Easter	
Whit Monday	Monday falling 50 days after Easter	
Sovereign's Birthday	Normally observed on the second Friday in June; called Festival Friday until 2020	
1 July	Virgin Islands Day	Exists since 1956, first as Colony Day, 1978 renamed to Territory Day, since 2021 current name
Emancipation Monday	First Monday in August; celebrating emancipation in the Territory; called Festival Monday until 2020	
Emancipation Tuesday	called Festival Tuesday until 2020	
Emancipation Wednesday	called Festival Wednesday until 2020	
Heroes and Foreparents Day	Observed on the third Monday in October; should originally be named Heroes and Foreparents Day; replaces	
The 1949 Great March and Restoration Day	Observed on the fourth Monday in November; first observed in 2021	
25 December	Christmas Day	
26 December	Boxing Day	

== See also ==
- List of holidays by country
