= Richard Hetherington =

Royal Navy officer and President of the British Virgin Islands (1785–1859)

Richard Hetherington (1785 – 1859) was a British naval officer, influential landowner and colonial administrator.

Son of Colonel Richard Hetherington b Dec 1737 (Hollins, Westmoreland, England), died Aug 1821 at Tortola and Mary Pickering born c. 1743, died 1788 (Thornton in Lonsdale, Lancashire), he was born in England (Christened in Burton in Lonsdale) and was a naval Captain. He married Mary Bell born c. 1785 died 30 November 1819 (during a hurricane at Tortola). Mary and Richard had two daughters Caroline Lavinia Fitz Hetherington (b after 1805) at Tortola and Bell Ellis Hetherington (b after 1805) at Tortola. From 1811 to 1839, he was the President of the British Virgin Islands. In 1843 he became a Lieutenant of the Royal Navy.

Bell Ellis Hetherington (b after 1805) at Tortola married Alan Stewart c. 1840s, Alan Stewart and Bell Ellis Hetherington had at least one son, John Ellis Stewart born 1848 in Prahran, Melbourne, Victoria, Australia died 21 December 1918 in Prahran, Melbourne, Victoria, Australia, (buried 23 December 1918 in St Kilda Cemetery, Melbourne, Victoria).

Hetherington was president of the council during the time of the trial of Arthur Hodge for the murder of the slave "Prosper". Hetherington appears to have taken on the role of prosecuting counsel. In response to the submission that Hodge could not be guilty of murdering his own slave, Hetherington is reported to have submitted to the jury:

"...the law makes no distinction between master and servant. God created white and he created black creatures; and as God makes no distinction in administering justice, and to Him each is alike, you will not, nor can you alter your verdict, if murder has been proved - whether on white persons or on black persons, the crime is equally the same with God and the law."

The Richard Hetherington who was President of the Council and acted at the trial of Arthur William Hodge was the father (1737-1821) not the son. The brief biography of Richard Hetherington the son (1785-1859) in Wikisource - Heseltine, Albert, A Naval Biographical Dictionary, edited by William R. O'Byrne suggests it is highly unlikely he was old enough or available to take up such a role in 1811. See also John Andrew (2000) The Hanging of Arthur Hodge.

== Political summary ==
Government offices
Preceded by John Nugent Smyth	President of the British Virgin Islands; 1811–1839	Succeeded by Edward Hay Drummond Hay
