= Edward Hay-Drummond =

English clergyman

The Very Reverend Edward Auriol Hay-Drummond (10 April 1758, Westminster –30 December 1829), was an English clergyman.

== Early life ==
Hay-Drummond was born on 10 April 1758 at Westminster and was baptised in St. Margaret's, Westminster. He was the fifth son of Robert Hay Drummond (1711–1776), the Archbishop of York, and Henrietta (née Auriol) (d. 1773).

He was educated at Christ Church, Oxford, matriculating in 1774, and receiving his BA in 1777, MA in 1780, and B&DD in 1791.

== Career ==
He was Prebendary of York in 1784, then Chaplain in Ordinary to George III in 1789, and to William IV.

In 1789, he was Prebendary of Southwell. He also served as Rector of Rothbury, Northumberland, Rector of Hadleigh, Suffolk, for 33 years from 1796 to 1829 through an exchange with Dr. Watson, Prebendary of Southwell Minster in 1806, Rector of Dalham, Suffolk in 1822 and Dean of Bocking, Essex.

=== Works ===
Two of his works are still available today: "On the religious education of the poor", a sermon, preached at the Church of St. Botolph, Bishopsgate, London, 25 May 1800, before the Correspondent Board in London of the Society in Scotland; and "A steady attachment to the Christian faith. Peculiar duty of its established ministers." Preached in the parish church of Alnwick, in Northumberland, 8 August 1792.

== Personal life ==
Hay-Drummond was twice married and is believed to have fathered a total of ten children. On 12 December 1782, he married Elizabeth Vismes (d. 1790), a daughter of William, Comte de Vismes. Before her death on 14 February 1790, they were the parents of:

- Henrietta Auriol Hay-Drummond (d. 1832), who married Morgan Watkins in 1831.
- Edward William Auriol Drummond-Hay (1785-1845), who married Louisa Margaret Thomson (d. 1869) in 1812.

On 24 May 1791, while "of the Parish of St Margaret's, Westminster", Hay-Drummond remarried to Amelia Emily Auriol (1762–1840) at St George's, Hanover Square. They were the parents of:

- Amelia Auriol Hay-Drummond (1794–1871), who eloped with his curate, George Wilkins, to Gretna Green, where they were married on 2 September 1811, ten days before her 17th birthday. The couple then returned to live in the parental home in Hadleigh, and went on to have fifteen children, a granddaughter of one of whom was Olave St. Clair Soames, who became World Chief Guide.

He died on 30 December 1829 in Hadleigh and was buried at Hadleigh within the altar rails on 9 January 1830. There is a mural monument on the south wall of the Lady Chapel at Hadleigh. His widow died on 7 October 1840, in Southwold, Suffolk.
