= Nottingham Blitz =

1941 Nazi aerial bombing raid on Nottingham, England during World War II

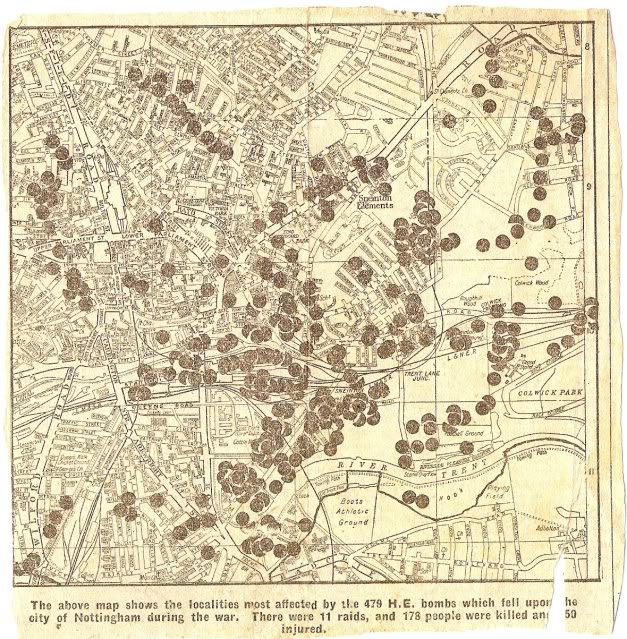
Map of locations of bombing in Nottingham during the Second World War. Published in the Nottingham Evening Post 17 May 1945

The Nottingham Blitz was an attack by the Nazi German Luftwaffe on Nottingham during the night of 8–9 May 1941.

== Defence preparations ==
Nottingham was the first city in Britain to develop an ARP (Air Raid Precautions) network. It was developed because of the foresight of Nottingham City Police Chief Constable Captain Athelstan Popkess. The city was divided into zones, controlled by report and control centres with 45 auxiliary fire service stations.

By the time of the raid, Nottingham had built a significant number of public shelters. The John Player & Sons tobacco company had built a network of tunnels at its factory and under local streets sufficient to house around 5,000 of its workers.

The raid on the night of 8–9 May by the Luftwaffe was targeted at Nottingham and Derby. The X-Gerät beams set up to cover the Rolls-Royce works were detected, and radio counter-measures diverted the attack to the moors north east of the town.

A Starfish decoy fire system located near Cropwell Butler in the Vale of Belvoir confused the aircraft, and many of the bombs intended for Nottingham were dropped on open farmland in the vale.

== The raid ==
There were over 100 bombers in the Nottingham raid. Emergency services tackled 97 fires on the night of the Nottingham Blitz on 8 and 9 May 1941. Records list 12 fires as serious, 40 as major and 42 as medium. In some cases, fires started by incendiary bombs were put out before they took hold.

Firefighters successfully tackled a fire in the south transept at St Mary's Church after an incendiary bomb burned through the roof. A turntable ladder was positioned on High Pavement to enable them to direct a hose on to the roof. The vicar of St. Mary's, Neville Stuart Talbot noted:

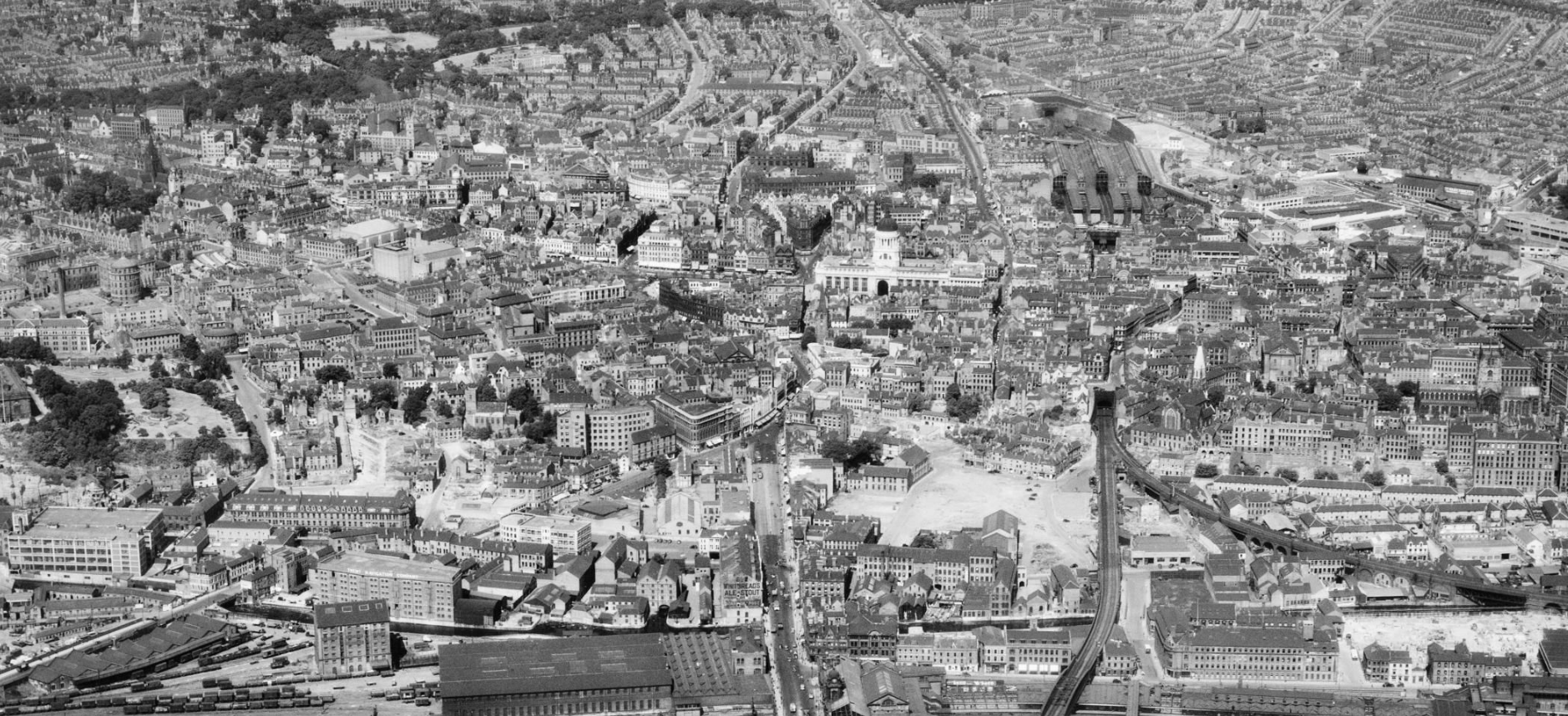
Nottingham in 1947 showing bomb damage

We had a visitation - nothing compared with some places, but still a very real taste. Began about twelve. We had gone to bed, and tried to believe that the explosions were our guns, but soon one and then another were unmistakable - one was not far off down Friar's Lane. Peering out of the top window, I soon realised that big fires had been started, so, there being a lull, I went down. I found a fire going in the South Transept of the Church. It took a long time really to put it out.

There were fierce fires at Trivett's Building near St. Mary's Church, in Short Hill and three of the Boots' factories in Poplar Street, Island Street and Station Street.

== Buildings destroyed ==
- St. John the Baptist's Church, Leenside, Nottingham, remains demolished and site cleared after the war.
- St. Christopher's Church, Sneinton, rebuilt by 1952
- Stadium Hotel, Parliament Street

== Buildings damaged ==
- St. Mary's Church, Nottingham
- Nottingham Masonic Hall
- University College Nottingham
- Shakespeare Street Wesleyan Reform Chapel
- Moot Hall, Friar Lane

== Casualties ==
Casualties were heavy. There were 159 people recorded as killed with 274 injured. At the Co-op bakery on Meadow Lane, 49 employees and members of the Home Guard were killed, and 20 others injured.

== Other raids ==
The Nottingham Evening Post of 17 May 1945 records that there were 11 raids on Nottingham in total, 178 people were killed and 350 injured. 479 high explosive bombs were dropped. The Commonwealth War Graves Commission lists 186 civilians died in Nottingham County Borough as a result of enemy action.
