= William Wilkins (architect) =

English architect and archaeologist (1778–1839)

- Born: 31 August 1778; Norwich, Norfolk, England
- Died: 31 August 1839 (aged 61); Lensfield, Cambridge, England
- Occupation: Architect
- Buildings: University College London; National Gallery, London

William Wilkins RA (31 August 1778 – 31 August 1839) was an English architect, classical scholar and archaeologist. He designed the National Gallery, Downing College, Cambridge and University College London, and buildings for several Cambridge colleges.

== Life ==
Wilkins was born in the parish of St Giles, Norwich, the son of William Wilkins (1751–1815), a successful builder who also managed the Norwich Theatre Circuit, a chain of theatres. His younger brother George Wilkins became Archdeacon of Nottingham.

He was educated at Norwich School and then won a scholarship to Gonville and Caius College, Cambridge. He graduated as 6th wrangler in 1800. With the award of the Worts Travelling Bachelorship in 1801, worth £100 for three years, he was able to visit the classical antiquities Greece, Asia Minor, and Magna Græcia in Italy between 1801 and 1804. On his tour he was accompanied by the Italian landscape painter Agostino Aglio, whom Wilkins had commissioned as a draughtsman on the expedition. Aglio supplied the drawings for the aquatint plates of monuments illustrating Wilkins' volumes from the expedition, such as The Antiquities of Magna Graecia (1807).

Wilkins was a member of the Society of Dilettanti from 1817. He published researches into both Classical and Gothic architecture, becoming one of the leading figures in the English Greek Revival of the early 19th century.

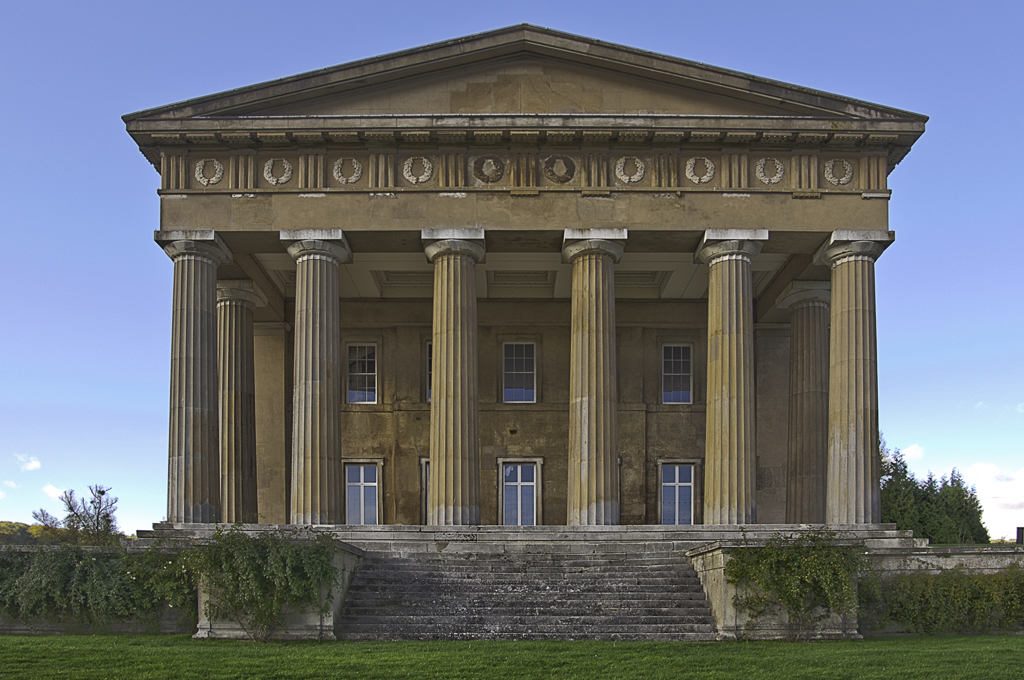
The Grange, Northington

His architectural career began in 1804 with his Greek-revival designs for the newly established Downing College, Cambridge. The commission came after earlier plans in a Palladian style by James Wyatt had been rejected as insufficiently classical. Wilkins arranged the college buildings around a single large courtyard. Construction began in 1807 and proceeded slowly, coming to a halt in 1821 with Wilkins' scheme still incomplete.

In 1806, Wilkins designed a college near Hertford for the East India Company. It became Haileybury College following the dissolution of the company. His first domestic commission was for Osberton House in Nottinghamshire, possibly incorporating parts of an existing building. These works were followed in 1808 by the Doric entrance to the Lower Assembly Rooms at Bath, and a villa at North Berwick for Sir H. D. Hamilton. At Grange Park, Northington, Hampshire, in 1809, Wilkins encased and remodelled an existing seventeenth-century house, giving it something of the form of a Greek temple, with a large Doric portico at one end.

In 1815, Wilkins inherited his father's chain of six theatres. He continued to manage them for the rest of his life, and rebuilt or remodelled several of them, occasionally also designing scenery.

In 1822–26, he collaborated with John Peter Gandy on the Clubhouse for the new United University Club, in Pall Mall, London. He was made an associate of the Royal Society in 1824 and given full membership in 1826.

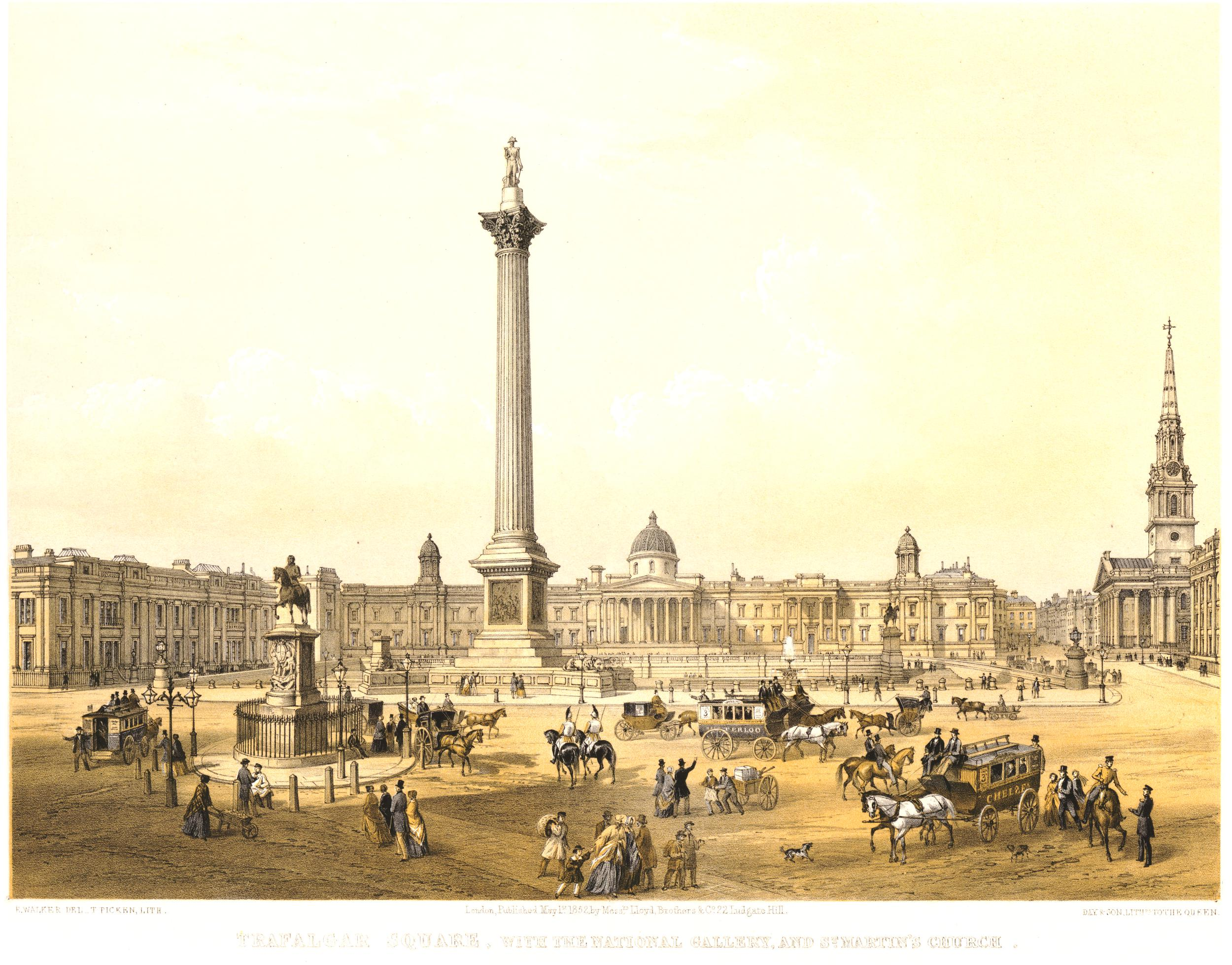
Trafalgar Square in 1852

Wilkins was influential in the development of London's Trafalgar Square, which had been opened up as part of a scheme by John Nash. He campaigned to have the new building for the National Gallery sited on the north side of the square, initially suggesting that the existing building, William Kent's Great Mews should be converted for the purpose. The government accepted the idea, but opted for a wholly new building, and a Neoclassical design by Wilkins was accepted over alternative schemes by Nash and CR Cockerell. Wilkins also drew up plans for the laying out of the square itself. They were not put into effect, although the scheme eventually carried out by Charles Barry after Wilkins' death replicated many of his ideas. The appearance of the National Gallery (1832–38), which was originally shared with the Royal Academy, attracted adverse criticism from the beginning. John Summerson concluded in 1962 that although Wilkins' frontage has many virtues "considered critically as a façade commanding a great square, its weakness is apparent".

In 1827–28 Wilkins designed two other major London buildings in a severe Classical style: University College in Gower Street, and St George's Hospital (now The Lanesborough Hotel) on Hyde Park Corner. His other Greek Revival works include the Theatre Royal Bury St Edmunds 1819, St. Paul's Church, George Street, Nottingham 1822 and the Yorkshire Museum (1830). He was responsible for two columns commemorating Admiral Nelson, Nelson's Pillar in Dublin and the Britannia Monument in Great Yarmouth. Both predate William Railton's design for Trafalgar Square.

He also produced buildings in the Gothic style, such as Dalmeny House for Lord Rosebery in 1814–17 and Tregothnan for Lord Falmouth in 1816. He used the style at several Cambridge colleges: in 1823 he won the competition to design a set of new buildings for King's College, Cambridge, comprising the hall, provost's lodge, library, and a stone screen towards Trumpington Street, and in the same year started work on the King's court of Trinity College, and new buildings, including the chapel, at Corpus Christi College.

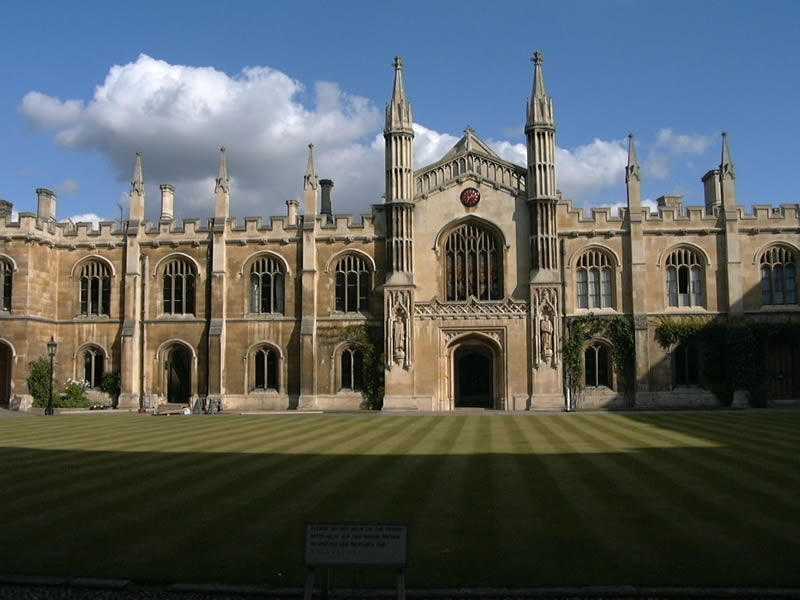
Corpus Christi College, Cambridge. Wilkins is buried in the chapel at centre.

In 1827, Wilkins was appointed architect to the East India Company, and the next year made alterations to its building in Leadenhall Street. He entered the competition to design the Duke of York's Column, and in 1836 that for the rebuilding of the Houses of Parliament. After failing to win the latter he attacked the plans of his rivals and the decision of the committee in a pamphlet signed "Phil-archimedes".

He was appointed professor of architecture at the Royal Academy following the death of John Soane in 1837, but gave no lectures before he himself died at his house in Cambridge on 31 August 1839. He was buried in the crypt under the chapel of Corpus Christi College.

== List of publications ==
- Some Account of the Prior's Chapel at Ely in pages 105–12 Archaeologia XIV (1801)
- Antiquities of Magna Graecia (1807).
- Observations on the Porta Honoris of Caius College, Cambridge in Vetusta Monumenta, iv (1809)
- The Civil Architecture of Vitruvius: Comprising those Books of the Author which Relate to the Public and Private Edifices off the Ancients (1813 and 1817).
- Atheniensia, or Remarks of the Topography and Buildings in Athens (1816).
- Remarks on the Architectural Inscription Brought from Athens, and now Preserved in the British Museum in pages 580–603, Memoirs relating to European & Asiatic Turkey edited by Robert Walpole (1817).
- On the Sculptures of the Parthenon in Travels in Various Countries edited by Walpole (1820).
- Report on the State of Sherborne Church (1828).
- Prolusiones Architectonicae or Essays on Subjects Connected with Grecian and Roman Architecture (1837).
- The Lydo-Phrygian Inscription in pages 155–60 of Transactions of the Royal Society of Literature of the United Kingdom, III (1839).

== List of architectural work ==
- Downing College, Cambridge, designed (1805), west range built (1807–13), east range built (1818–22); the remainder of the design remained unexecuted.
- East India College (now Haileybury College), Hertfordshire (1805–09).
- Norwich Cathedral, restoration work with his father (1806).
- Lower Assembly Rooms, Bath, Somerset, later the Bath Royal Literary Institution, (1808); demolished (1933).
- Nelson's Pillar, Dublin, altered in execution by Francis Johnston.
- The Grange, Northington, remodelling based on a Greek temple (1809).
- Argyll House, Argyll Street, London, alterations to the interior (1809); demolished.
- Pentillie Castle, Cornwall, addition of a new wing (1810).
- Theatre, Colchester, Essex, renovations (1811); demolished.
- Lensfield House, Lensfield Road, Cambridge, remodelled, including portico (1811); Wilkins' own house, demolished (1955) and now replaced by the Chemistry Department of Cambridge University.
- Theatre Royal, Newmarket Road, Cambridge (1814), later remodelled.
- Dalmeny House, West Lothian (1814–19).
- Nelson Column, Great Yarmouth (1815–17).
- Tregothnan, Cornwall (1815–18).
- Theatre Royal, Great Yarmouth (1816); demolished.
- The Perse School, Cambridge, remodelling of interiors (1816); demolished.
- Former Freemason's Hall, Bath, Somerset (1817).
- Keswick Hall, Norfolk, remodelling and additions (1817–19).
- King's College Bridge, Cambridge (1818).
- Theatre Royal, Bury St Edmunds (1818).
- Church of St Mary the Great, Cambridge, alterations to the interior including a new west gallery (1819).
- Dunmore Park, Stirlingshire, (1820–2); now derelict/ ruinous.
- New Norfolk Gaol and Shire House, Norwich, built as part of the Norwich Castle complex (1820–24); partly demolished.
- St. Paul's Church, Nottingham (1821–22); demolished (1926).
- New Court, Trinity College, Cambridge (1821–1827).
- United University Club, Pall Mall East, London (1821–26); rebuilt 1902.
- New Court, Corpus Christi College, Cambridge (1821–27).
- Entrance Screen with Gatehouse and South Range with Great Hall and Library. King's College, Cambridge (1823–28).
- East India Company Military Seminary, Addiscombe, Surrey, added dining room, barracks and office block (1825–27); demolished 1861.
- Theatre Royal, Norwich, reconstruction, including a Greek doric colonnade (1825–26); burnt down 1934.
- Former St George's Hospital, (now The Lanesborough Hotel), Hyde Park Corner, London (1826–28).
- County Gaol, Huntingdon (1826).
- University College London (1826–1830), later completed to amended designs by 1869.
- Yorkshire Philosophical Society Museum (now Yorkshire Museum) (1827–30).
- Brooke Hall, Norfolk, additions (1827). Demolished 1949 following wartime damage.
- House, Kingsweston, Bristol, addition of a Doric portico (1828).
- National Gallery, London (1831–1838); originally only one room deep, and also housing the Royal Academy; since much extended and remodelled.

== Gallery of architectural work ==
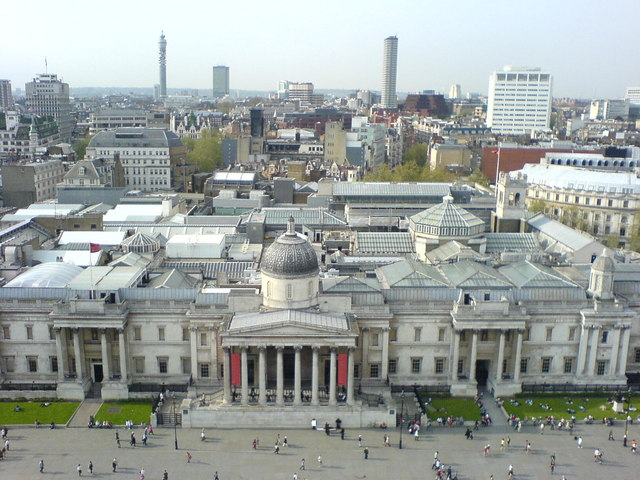
National Gallery, London

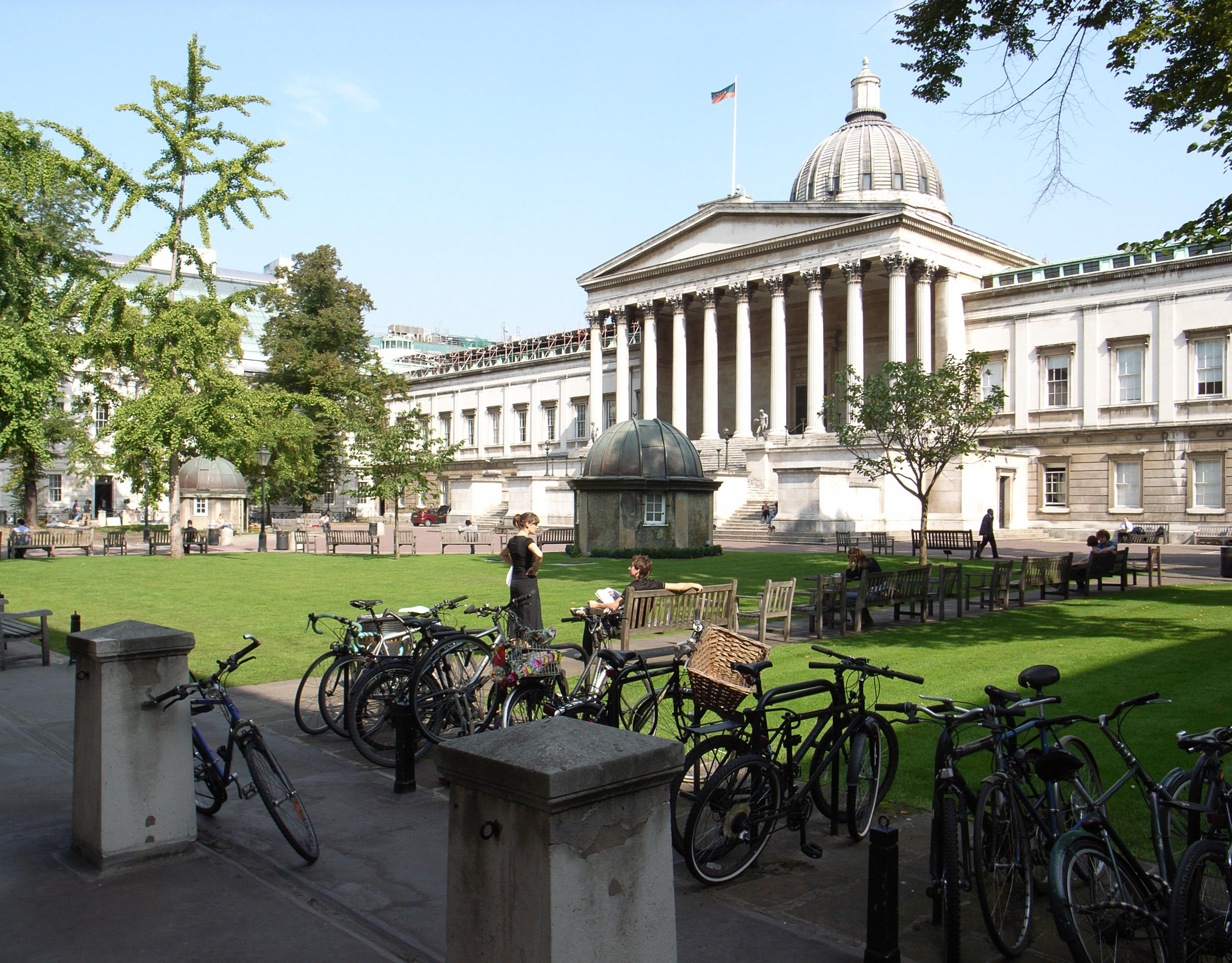
University College, London

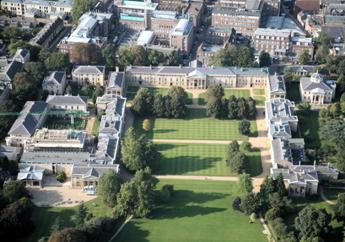
Downing College, Cambridge

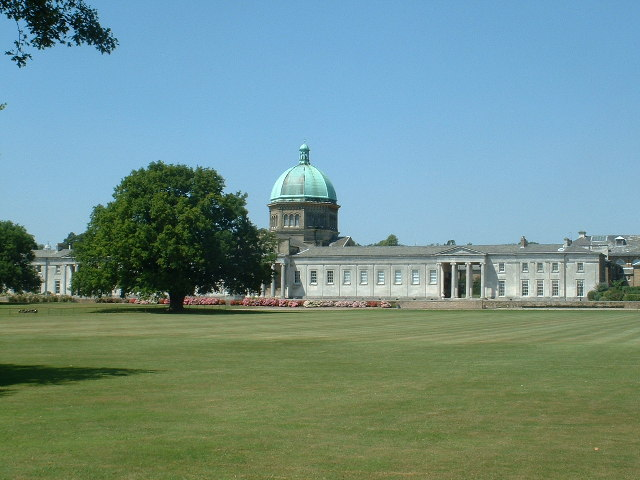
Haileybury College

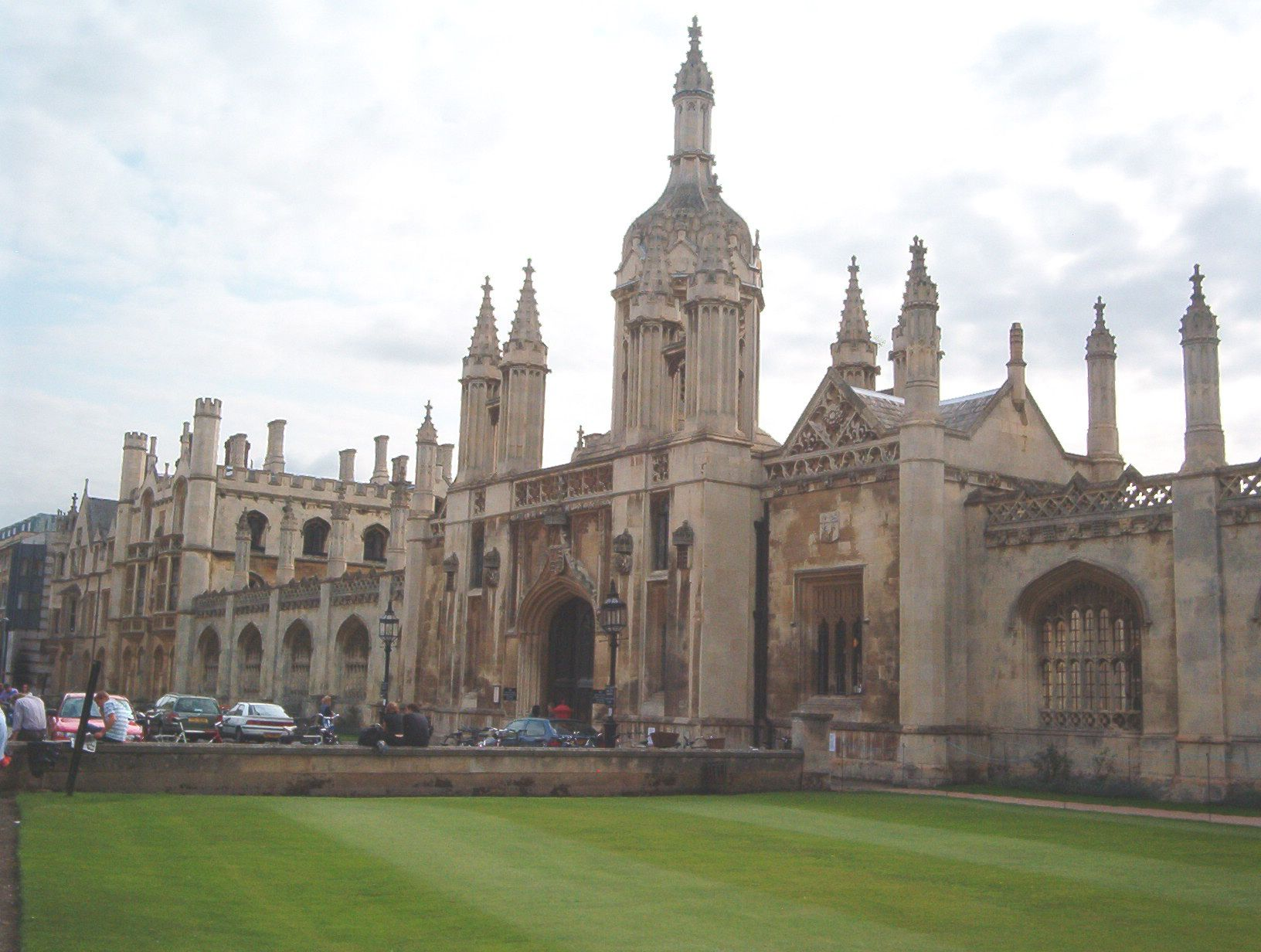
King's College, Cambridge

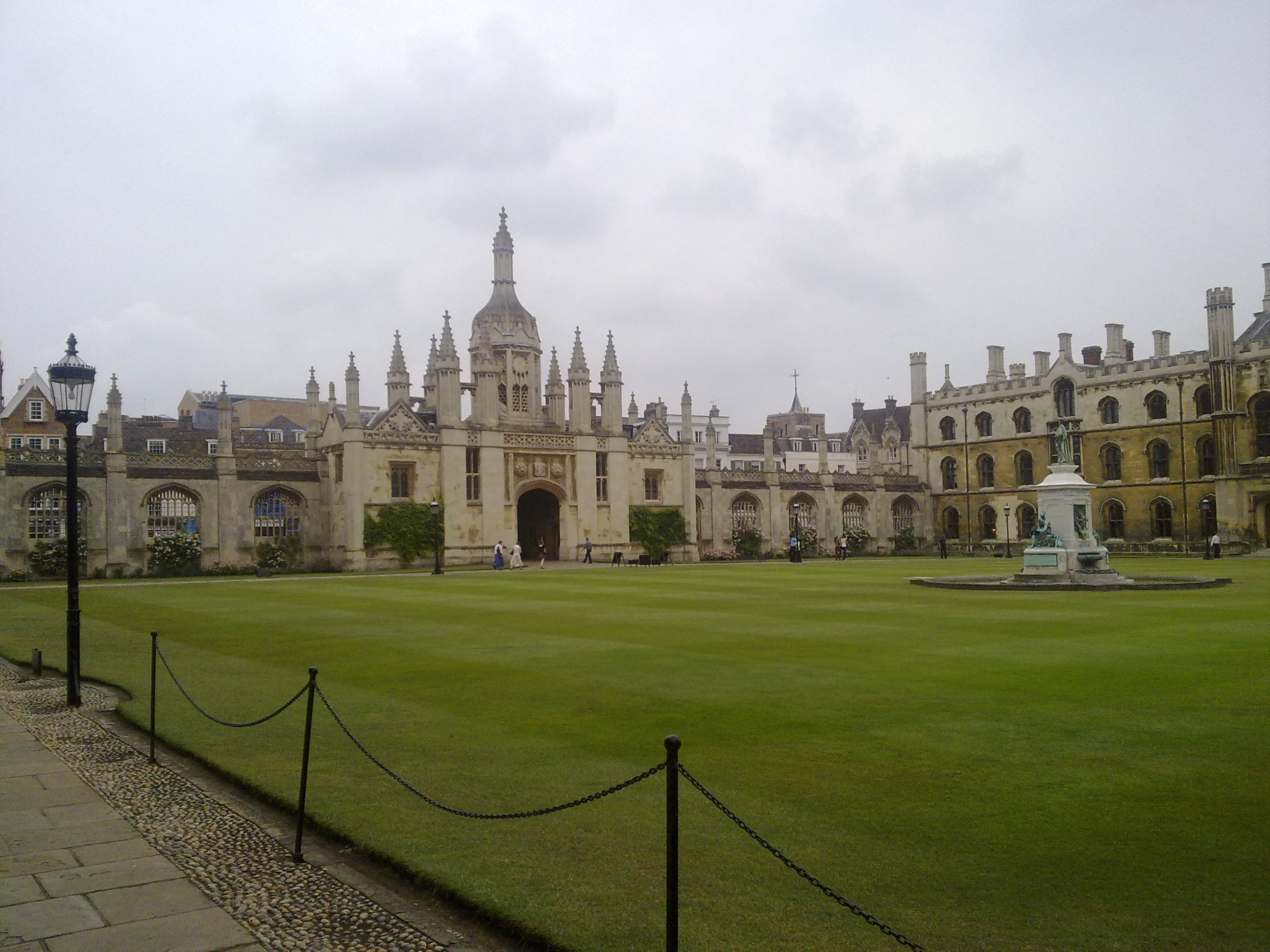
King's College, Cambridge

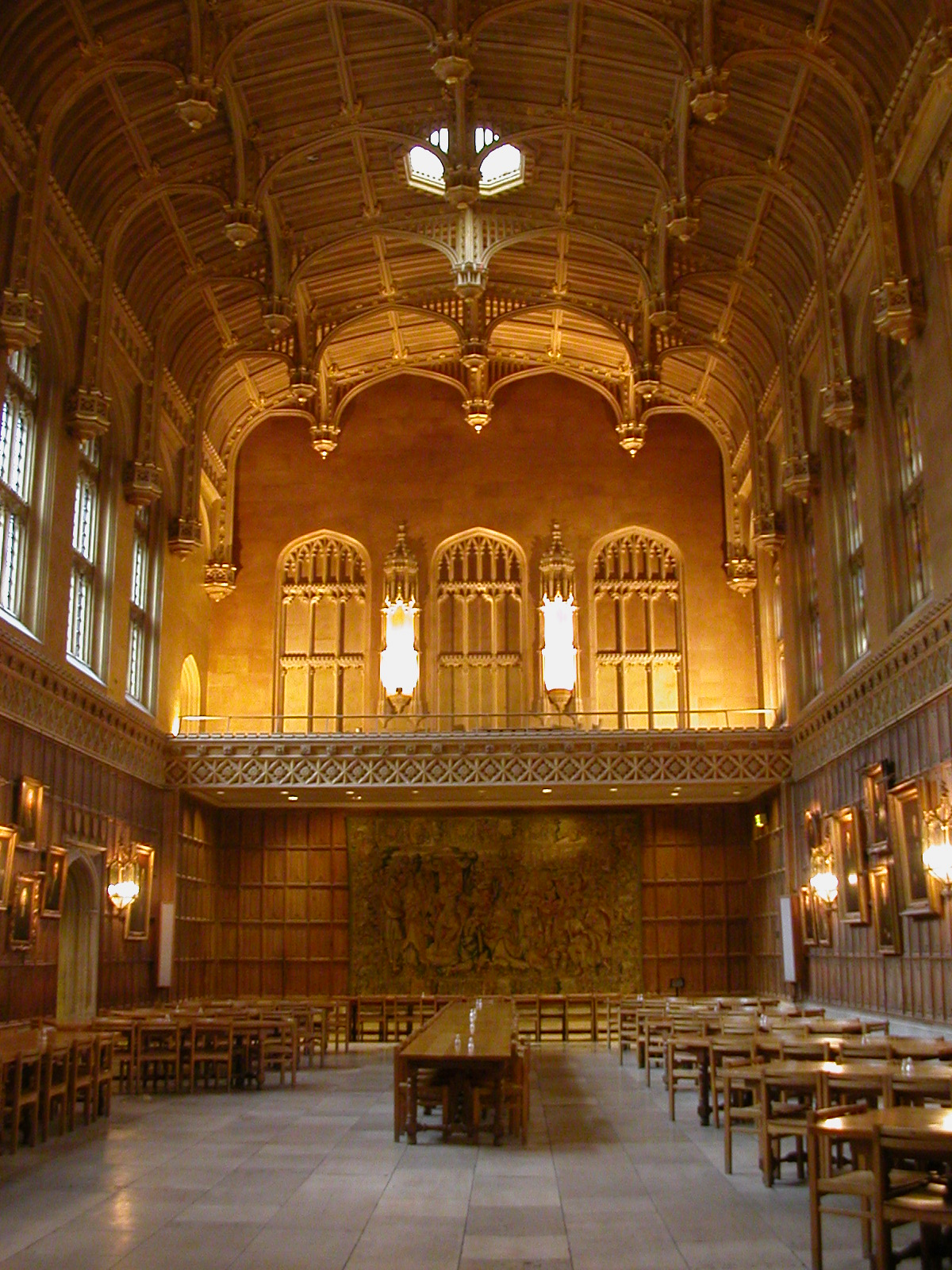
Great Hall, King's College, Cambridge

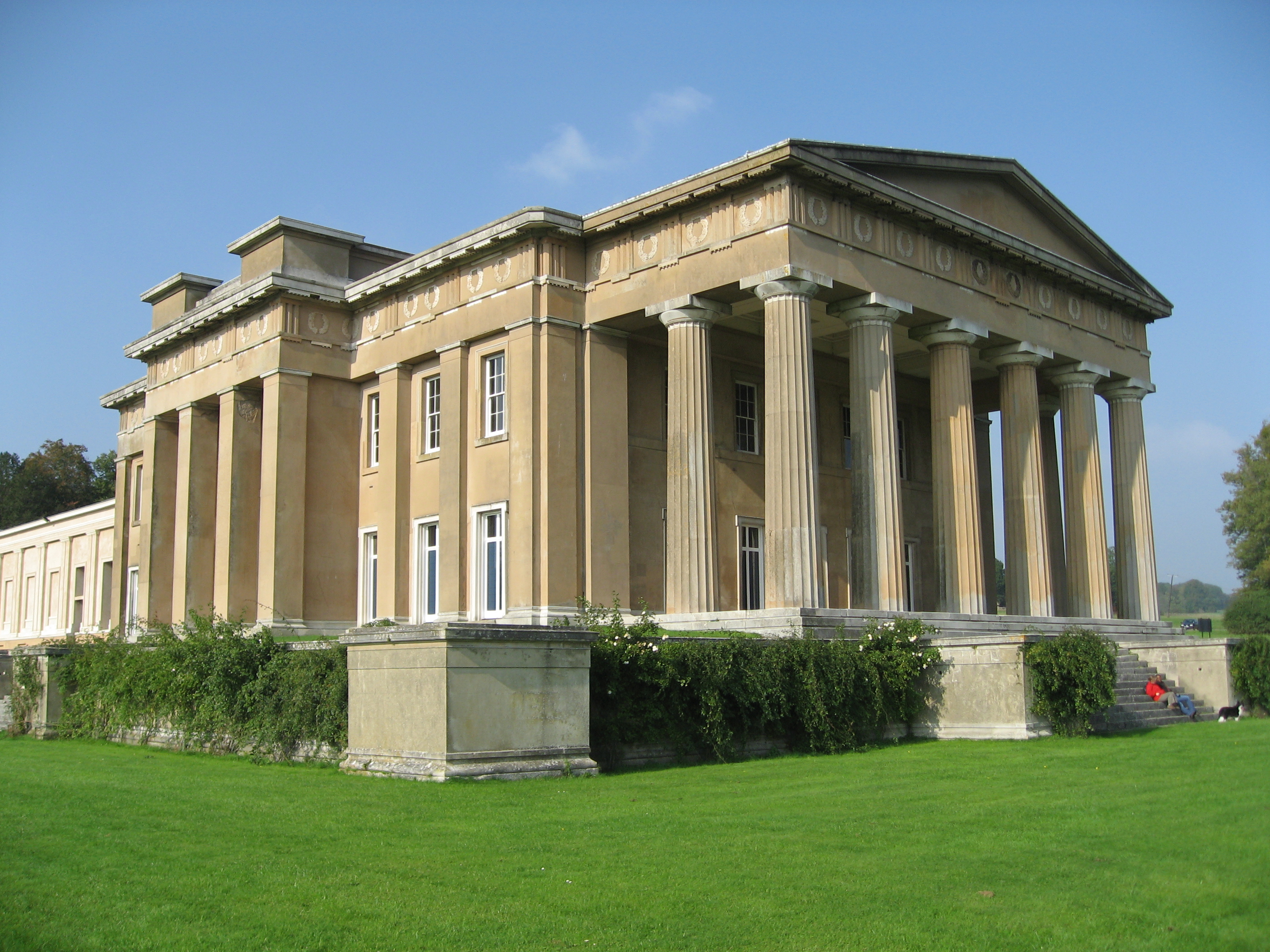
The Grange, Northington

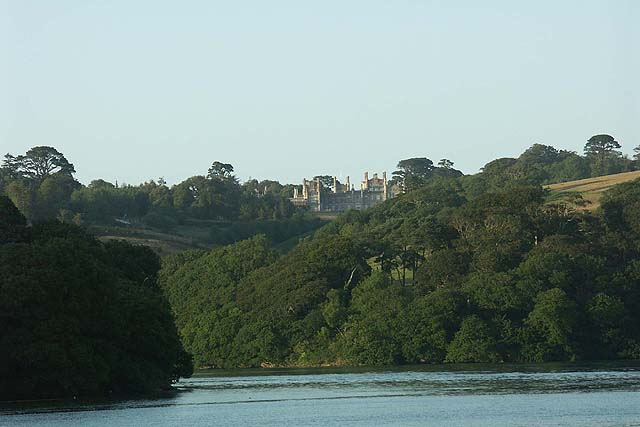
Tregothnan House

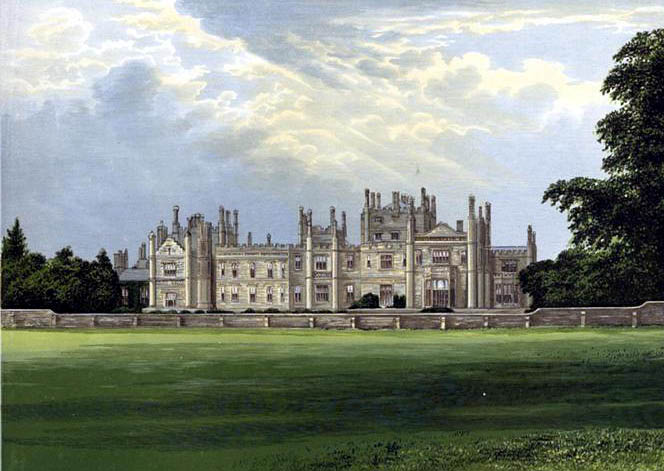
Tregothnan House

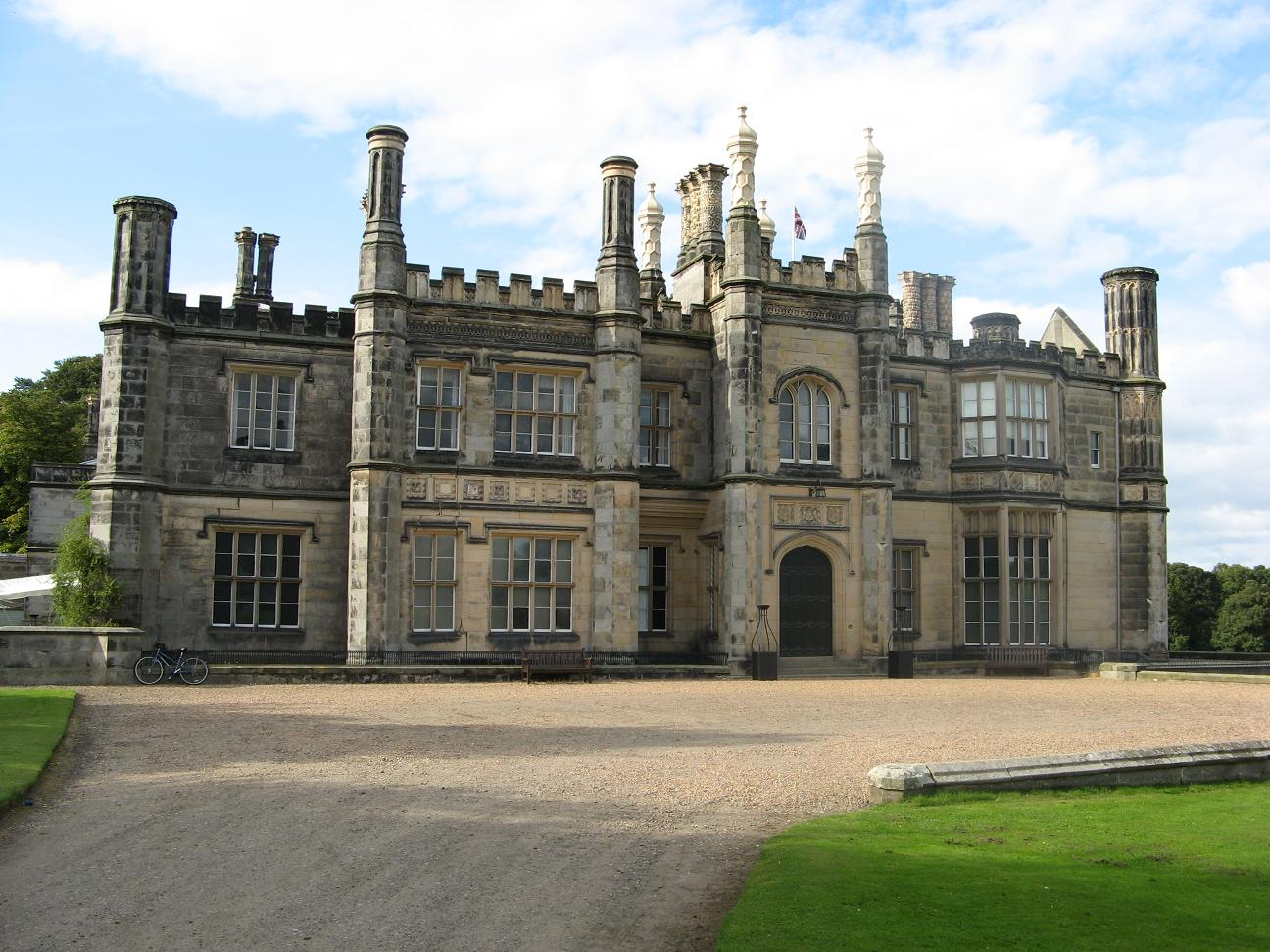
Dalmeny House

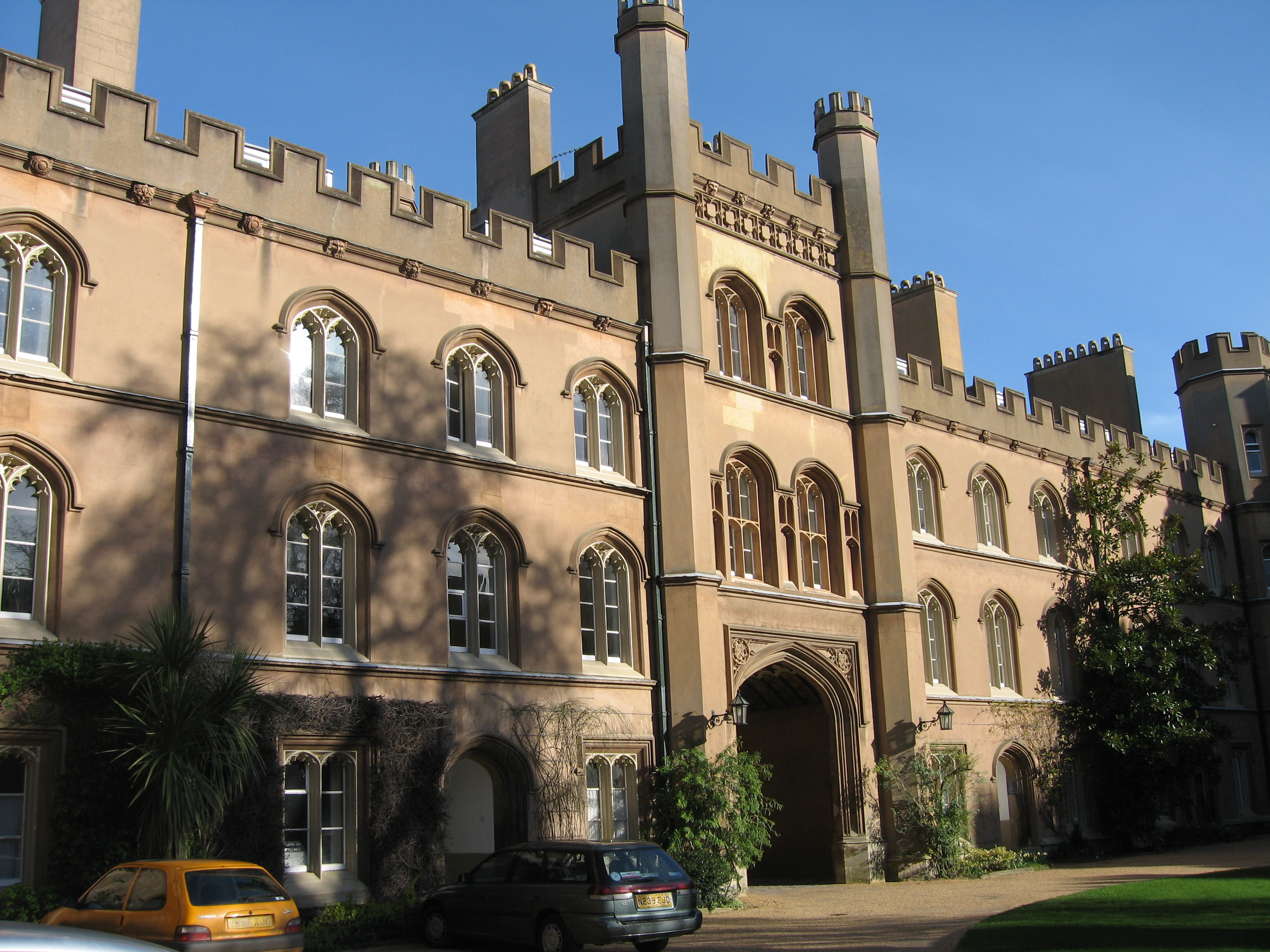
New Court, Trinity College, Cambridge

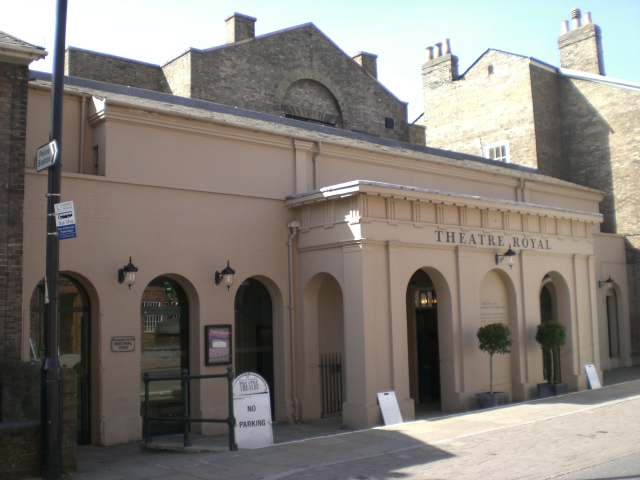
Theatre Royal,
Bury St Edmunds

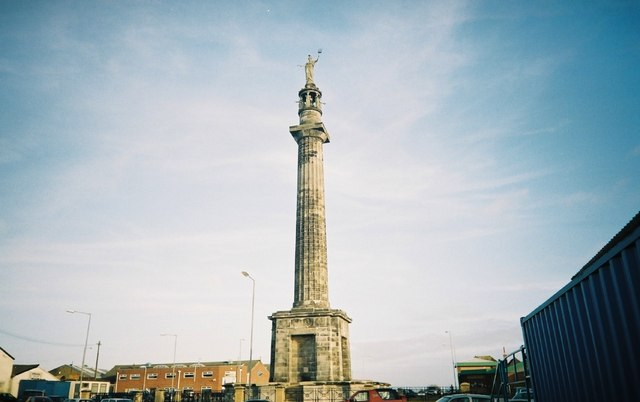
Britannia Monument,
Great Yarmouth

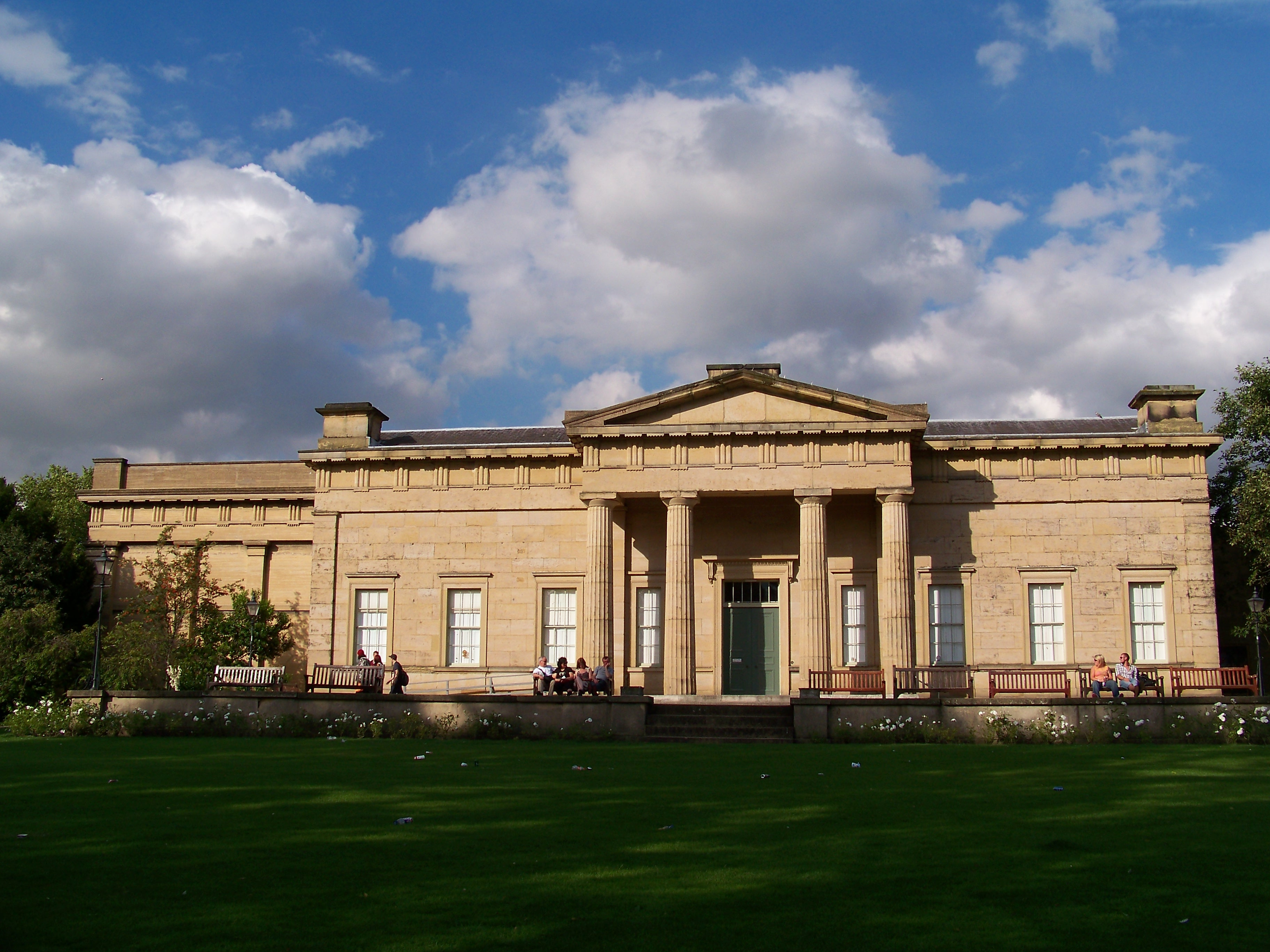
The Yorkshire Museum designed by William Wilkins in a Greek revival style

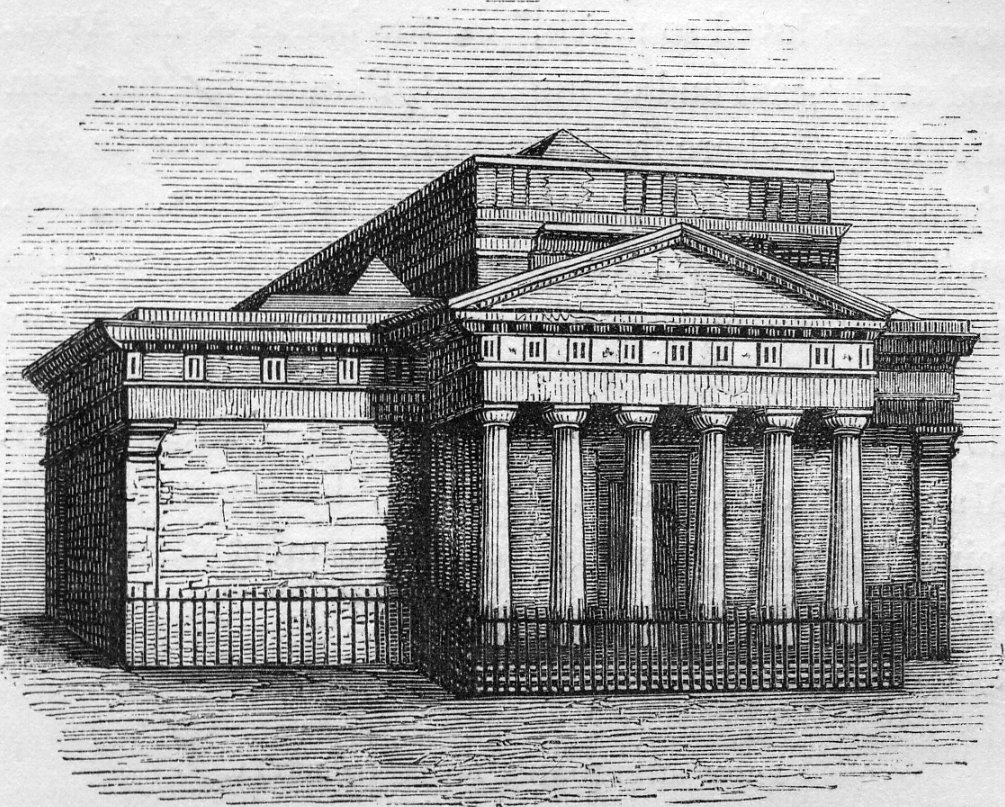
Lower Assembly Rooms, Bath 1808–9,
demolished 1933

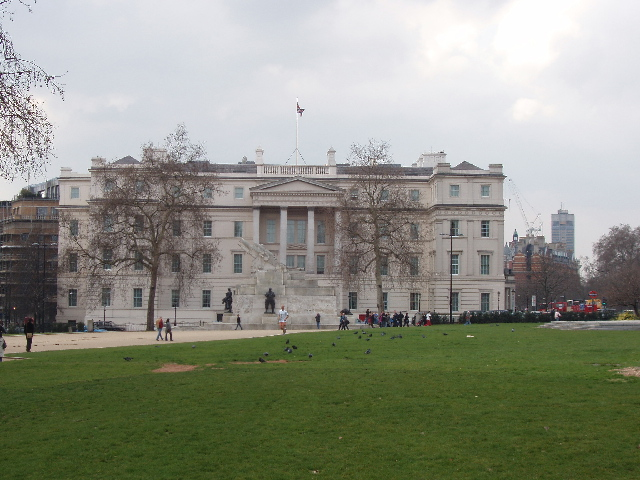
Former St George's Hospital, London, now Lanesborough Hotel

== Sources ==
- Liscombe, R. W. (1980). William Wilkins 1778–1839. Cambridge University Press.
- Mace, Rodney (1976). Trafalgar Square: Emblem of Empire. London: Lawrence and Wishart. ISBN 978-0-85315-368-9. Second edition published as Mace, Rodney (2005). Trafalgar Square: Emblem of Empire (2nd ed.). London: Lawrence and Wishart. ISBN 978-1-905007-11-0.
- Pevsner, Nikolaus (1954). Cambridgeshire. The Buildings of England. Harmondsworth.
- Searby, Peter (1988). A History of the University of Cambridge. Vol. 3. Cambridge: Cambridge University Press. ISBN 978-0-521-35060-0.
- Summerson, John (1962). Georgian London (revised ed.). Harmondsworth: Penguin Books.
- Liscombe, R. Windsor (2004). "Wilkins, William (1778–1839)". Oxford Dictionary of National Biography. Oxford Dictionary of National Biography (online ed.). Oxford University Press. doi:10.1093/ref:odnb/29422. (Subscription, Wikipedia Library access or UK public library membership required.)
