= Edward Drummond-Hay (antiquarian) =

British soldier, antiquarian and diplomat

- Arms of Edward Drummond-Hay

Consul-General of the United Kingdom to Morocco
- In office 1829–1845
- Preceded by: Vacant
- Succeeded by: Sir John Hay Drummond Hay

Personal details
- Born: Edward William Auriol Drummond-Hay; 4 April 1785 Alnwick, Northumberland
- Died: 28 February 1845 (aged 59) Tangier, Morocco
- Relations: Robert Hay Drummond (grandfather)
- Parent(s): Edward Hay-Drummond; Elizabeth de Vismes
- Education: Christ Church, Oxford

Edward William Auriol Drummond-Hay (4 April 1785 – 28 February 1845) was a British soldier, antiquarian and diplomat.

== Early life ==
Drummond-Hay was born on 4 April 1785 in Alnwick, Northumberland, the son of The Very Rev. Edward Hay-Drummond (1758–1829) and Elizabeth de Vismes (d. 1790). From his parents' marriage, he had one sister, Henrietta Auriol Hay-Drummond, married Morgan Watkins in 1831. After his mother died in 1790, his father married Amelia Emily Auriol. From that marriage, he had a younger half-sister, Amelia Auriol Hay-Drummond, who eloped with his father's curate, George Wilkins.

His paternal grandparents were Archbishop Robert Hay Drummond and the former Henrietta Auriol. His uncle was Thomas Hay, 9th Earl of Kinnoull. His maternal grandfather was Count William de Vismes.

He was educated at Christ Church, Oxford, graduating in 1806.

== Career ==
In 1808, he received a commission in the British Army and served with the 61st Regiment of Foot and 73rd (Perthshire) Regiment of Foot during the Napoleonic Wars. He fought in the Peninsular War and was present at the Battle of Waterloo in 1815.

On leaving the army, Drummond-Hay pursued his interest in antiquities and history, including undertaking a translation of Frederika Freygang and Wilhelm von Freygang's Letters from the Caucasus and Georgia. In August 1823, he moved to Edinburgh upon being appointed Lyon Clerk and Keeper of the Records, the role having been secured through the influence of his cousin, Thomas Hay-Drummond, 11th Earl of Kinnoull. On 8 March 1824, he joined the Society of Antiquaries of Scotland and was its Secretary between 1827 and 1829.

=== Diplomatic career ===
In 1829, Drummond-Hay was appointed Consul-General to Morocco and relocated to Tangiers. His private journals of his journey to Morocco, held by the Bodleian Library, cover the period from 1829 to 1830. His remit from the Foreign Office was to counter French expansionism in the region (particularly after the French conquest of Algeria in 1830) and to protect British shipping.

Following his death in Tangier in 1845, his son John took over his post and held it until 1886.

== Personal life ==
On 14 December 1812, Drummond-Hay married Louisa Margaret Thomson (d. 1869), a daughter of John Thomson. Together they had ten children, including:

- Sir Edward Drummond-Hay (1815–1884), who married Sarah Laura Livingston, daughter of Lt.-Col. James Livingston of the East India Company, in 1838. After her death, he married Alice Watts, daughter of Edward Watts of Hythe, Kent, in 1869.
- Sir John Hay Drummond-Hay (1816–1893), who married Annette Adelaide Christina Carstensen, daughter of Johan Arnold Hieronymus Carstensen, the Danish Consul-General to Morocco, in 1845.
- Louisa Drummond-Hay (b. 1817), who married Gerard Charles Antoine Norderling, in 1838.
- Elizabeth Catherine Drummond-Hay (1818–1911), who married William Greenwood Chapman, a son of James Chapman, in 1840.
- Thomas Robert Hay Drummond-Hay (1821–1883), a Colonel in the 42nd and 78th Highlanders; he married Louisa Thomson, daughter of Ringler Thomson, in 1853. After her death, he married Theresa Anne Augusta Duncombe, daughter of Francis Harold Duncombe, in 1861.
- Theodosia Drummond-Hay (1823–1885), who married Pierre Victor Mauboussin, the French Consul-General to Shanghai, in 1844.
- George William Drummond-Hay (1827–1881), a surveyor in Auckland and Coromandel, he died without issue.
- Sir Francis Ringler Drummond-Hay (1830–1905), the Consul-General in Tripoli; he married Margherita Paola in 1858.
- Henrietta Auriol Drummond-Hay (1832–1868), who married Henry Chandos-Pole-Gell, second son of Edward Sacheverell Chandos-Pole, of Radbourne Hall, in 1851.
- James de Vismes Drummond-Hay (1834–1886), the Consul to Valparaiso; he married Caroline Molinaris in 1854. After her death, he married Emily Louisa Price, daughter of R. Evans Price, in 1873. After her death, he married Annie Munro, daughter of Henry Hugh Munro, in 1884.

Drummond-Hay died in Tangier, Morocco in 1845. His widow died on 5 February 1869.

Diplomatic posts
Preceded by Vacant	Consul-General of the United Kingdom to Morocco; 1829–1845	Succeeded by Sir John Hay Drummond Hay
