= George Wilkins (priest) =

English priest (1785–1865)

George Wilkins, D.D. (1785–1865) served as a priest in the Church of England and was Archdeacon of Nottingham.

== Early life ==
George Wilkins was born in May 1785 in Norwich, the youngest of three sons and three daughters of William Wilkins (1749–1819) and Hannah née Willett (born 9 June 1754 in Norwich), who were married on 19 April 1776 in St Stephen's Church, Norwich. He came from a family of architects: his brother William Wilkins designed several famous buildings including the National Gallery, London. His father was estate architect to the head of the Pierrepont family, who since 1806 had been styled the Earl Manvers.

Wilkins was educated at the Grammar School at Bury St Edmunds and Caius College, Cambridge.

== Career ==
George was ordained in 1810 and served, in succession, as

- Curate of Great Plumstead 1808
- Curate of Hadleigh, Suffolk, 1808–1815
- Vicar of Laxton, Nottinghamshire, 1813–1817
- Vicar of Lowdham, Nottinghamshire, 1815–1839
- Vicar of St Mary's Church, Nottingham, 1817–1843
- Prebendary of Southwell Minster 1823–1865
- Rector of Wing, Rutland, 1827–1839, Archdeacon of Nottingham 1832–1865
- Rector of Beelsby, Lincolnshire, 1843–1865

During his time in Nottingham, he had a continuing problem in ensuring that people wanting to get married were genuine parishioners. He employed a sexton for each banns application to check the residence of the applicants. He himself had eloped to Gretna Green to marry Amelia Auriol Hay-Drummond while curate at Hadleigh. Wilkins, then aged 26, had lodged with the Rector, the Very Rev. Edward Auriol Hay-Drummond, whose paternal grandfather was Thomas Hay, 7th Earl of Kinnoull, son-in-law of Robert Harley, 1st Earl of Oxford. Amelia was the eldest daughter of the Rector. They were married on 2 September 1811, nine days before her 17th birthday. After the marriage, they returned to continue living in her parental home, and went on to have nine children.

As Vicar of St Mary's, Nottingham, he was preaching at a service when a loud crack from the masonry caused those attending to believe that the tower was collapsing, and a panic ensued. Wilkins summoned the architect Lewis Nockalls Cottingham to survey the fabric, and Cottingham implemented a scheme to prop up the tower with scaffolding while the tower piers were repaired. By selecting Cottingham, Wilkins is credited with saving St Mary's medieval fabric, rather than submitting to a project to rebuild the church.

He was also responsible for the construction of two churches out of St Mary's parish.

- St Paul's Church, George Street, Nottingham
- Holy Trinity Church, Trinity Square

A third church, St John the Baptist's Church, Leenside, Nottingham was begun during his incumbency but he resigned before its completion.

Wilkins was the author of The History of the Destruction of Jerusalem, as Connected with the Scripture Prophecies published in 1816.

== Family ==
Wilkin's second "posting" was in 1808, as Curate at Hadleigh under the Rector, Edward Hay-Drummond, into whose household he was invited to live. Three years later the young curate eloped with the Rector's daughter Amelia Auriol (born 11 September 1794 in Little Missenden; died 31 January 1871 in Bayswater, London) to Gretna Green, where they were married on 2 September 1811, nine days before her 17th birthday. They then returned to Hadleigh to continue living in her father's house.

They had 14 children, but at least five died in infancy:

1. Georgina Marian Wilkins, b. July 1827 in Nottingham, died 13 December 1894 at 226 Portsdown Rd, Bayswater, London, W2
2. Rev. John Murray Wilkins
3. Charles Hay Wilkins (1812–1813)
4. George Dashwood Wilkins (1813–1885)
5. Edward Murray Wilkins (1814–1814)
6. Emily Hay Wilkins (1817–)
7. Charlotte Louisa Wilkins (1818–1848)
8. Edward Drummond Wilkins (1820–1820)
9. Rosabelle St. Clair Wilkins (1821–1821)
10. Harriet Alicia Wilkins (1823–)
11. Augustus Wilkins (1824–1825)
12. Rev. Arthur Drummond Wilkins (1830–1892)
13. Reginald Hay Wilkins (1833–)
14. Augusta Emma Wilkins (1837–1872)
15. Henry St. Clair Wilkins (3 December 1828 – 1896)

== Death ==
Wilkins died on 13 August 1865 in Southwell, Nottinghamshire.

Religious titles
Preceded by George Hutchinson	Vicar of St Mary's Church, Nottingham; 1817–1843	Succeeded by Joshua William Brooks
