= Francis Williamson (architect) =

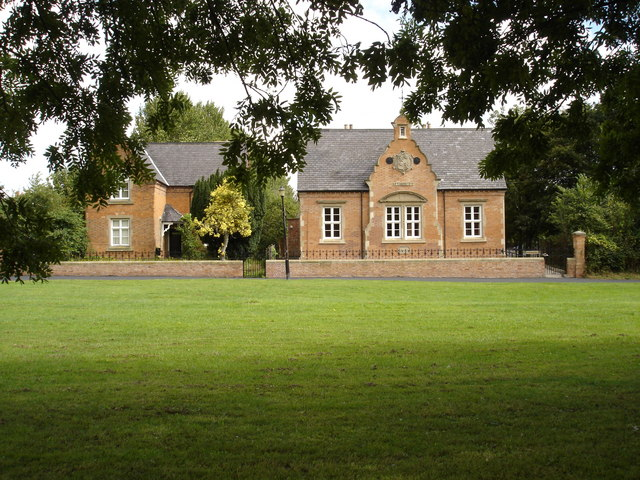
Clifton School (now Village Hall) 1871-72

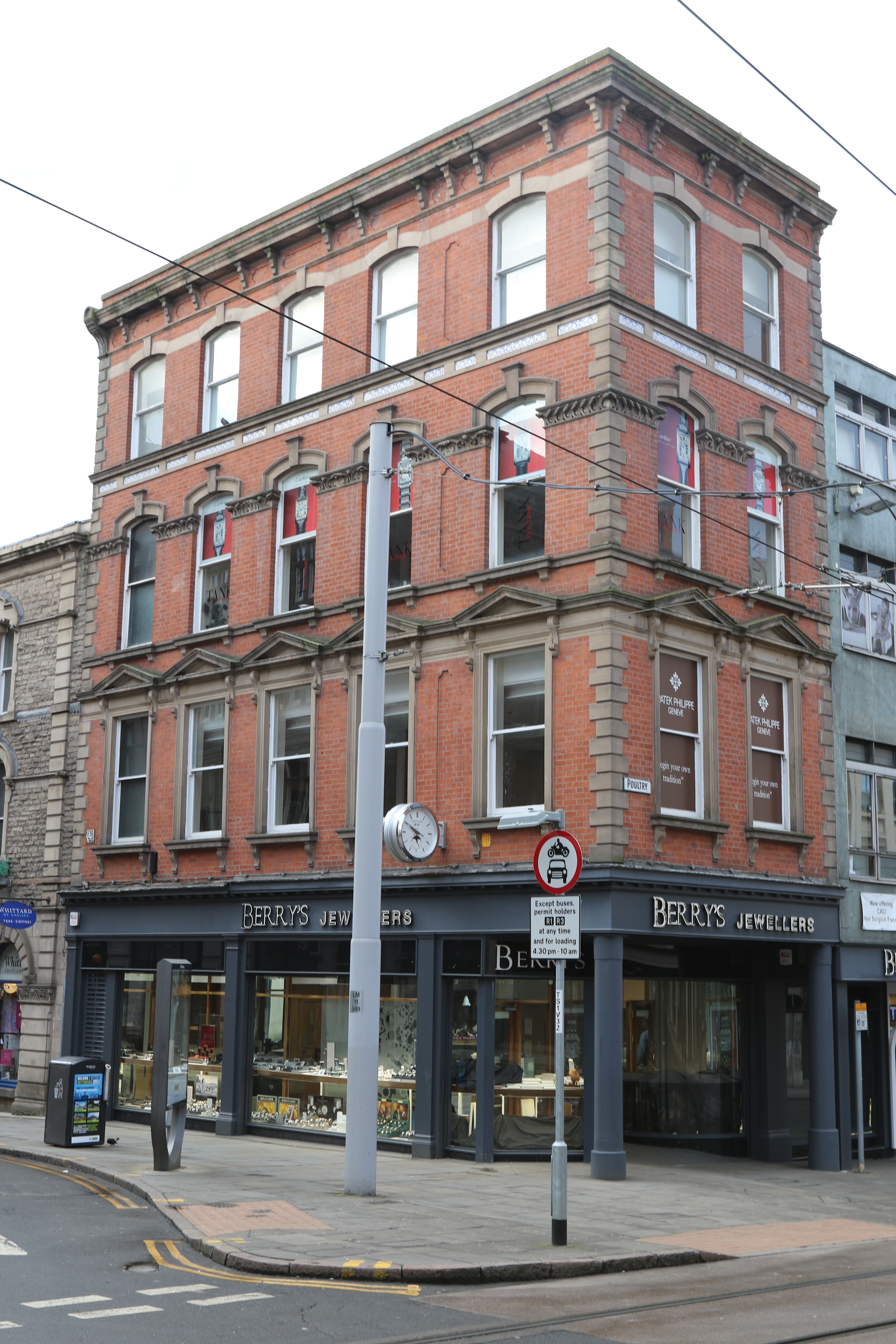
4 Bridlesmith Gate/13 Poultry, Nottingham. 1875

Francis Williamson (13 October 1822 - 26 November 1883) was a British surveyor and architect based in Nottingham.

== History ==
He was born on 13 October 1822 in Lowdham, Nottinghamshire, the son of William Williamson and Maria. He established himself in practice in Bottle Lane, Nottingham around 1848.

He married Anne Coulby on 22 May 1851 at St John’s Church, Carrington.

He died on 26 November 1883 and left an estate valued at £7,247 11s 1d (equivalent to £761,900 in 2025).

== Works ==
- Parsonage House, St. John the Baptist's Church, Leenside, Nottingham Station Road/London Road, Nottingham 1850-51 (demolished ca. 1899)
- Villa with outbuildings, Forest Grove, Nottingham 1851
- House, stable and outbuildings, Sneinton, 1852
- 2-20, Annesley Grove, Nottingham (for the Nottingham Freeholders’ Permanent Benefit Building Society) 1854
- Wilford School, Nottingham 1865-66 rebuilding
- Warehouse, Spaniel Row/Houndsgate 1874
- New School, Clifton, Nottingham 1871-72
- Pratt, Hurst and Company warehouse, Hollowstone, Nottingham 1873
- Warehouse, Spaniel Row/Houndsgate 1874
- Pair of shops 4 Bridlesmith Gate (also 13 Poultry, Nottingham) 1875
