= Simon Dawbarn (diplomat) =

British diplomat (1923–2019)

Sir Simon Yelverton Dawbarn, KCVO, CMG (16 September 1923 – 29 June 2019) was a British diplomat. Educated at Corpus Christi College, Cambridge, he served in the Reconnaissance Corps during the Second World War. In 1949, he joined HM Foreign Service. He was Head of the West Africa Department at the Foreign and Commonwealth Office between 1973 and 1975. He was then Consul-General in Montreal for three years before serving as the United Kingdom's Ambassador in Morocco from 1978 to 1982.

Dawbarn was appointed a Companion of the Order of St Michael and St George in the 1976 New Year Honours and was appointed a Knight Commander of the Royal Victorian Order in November 1980.
