= John Hay Drummond Hay =

The Right Honourable Sir John Hay Drummond Hay GCMG KCB
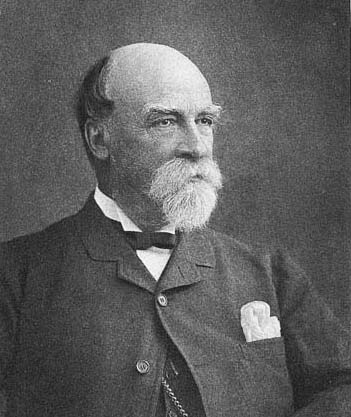

Envoy Extraordinary to Morocco
- In office 1845–1886
- Preceded by: Edward Drummond Hay
- Succeeded by: Sir William Kirby Green

Personal details
- Born: John Hay Drummond Hay; 1 June 1816 Valenciennes, France
- Died: 27 November 1893 (aged 77) Wedderburn Castle, Scotland
- Spouse: Sarah Laura Livingston (m. 1838; died 1868)
- Parent(s): Edward Drummond Hay; Louisa Margaret Thomason

Sir John Hay Drummond Hay GCMG KCB PC (1 June 1816 – 27 November 1893) was the United Kingdom's Envoy Extraordinary at the Court of Morocco in the 19th century.

== Early life ==
John Drummond Hay was born in 1816 in Valenciennes, France, where his father Captain Edward Drummond Hay, a nephew of the ninth Earl of Kinnoul, was serving in the British army of occupation. His mother was Louisa Margaret Thomason.

Like his elder brother, Edward Hay Drummond Hay, he was educated at the Edinburgh Academy, and then at Charterhouse School.

== Career ==
At the age of 24, he was appointed a paid attaché to the Embassy of Constantinople, where he remained for four years. He was then sent to Morocco to assist his father, who was serving there as Agent and Consul-General. Within a few months, he was promoted; though still having merely the rank of a paid attaché, he succeeded his temporary chief as Agent and Consul-General.

Drummond Hay's diplomatic service in Morocco would continue for more than forty years, and would involve considerable personal initiative; he was able to exercise significant freedom of action and independence from bureaucratic and political control. Over his lengthy time in Morocco, he developed significant influence both with the Moroccan government and with the Moroccan public at large, aided by his facility for languages.

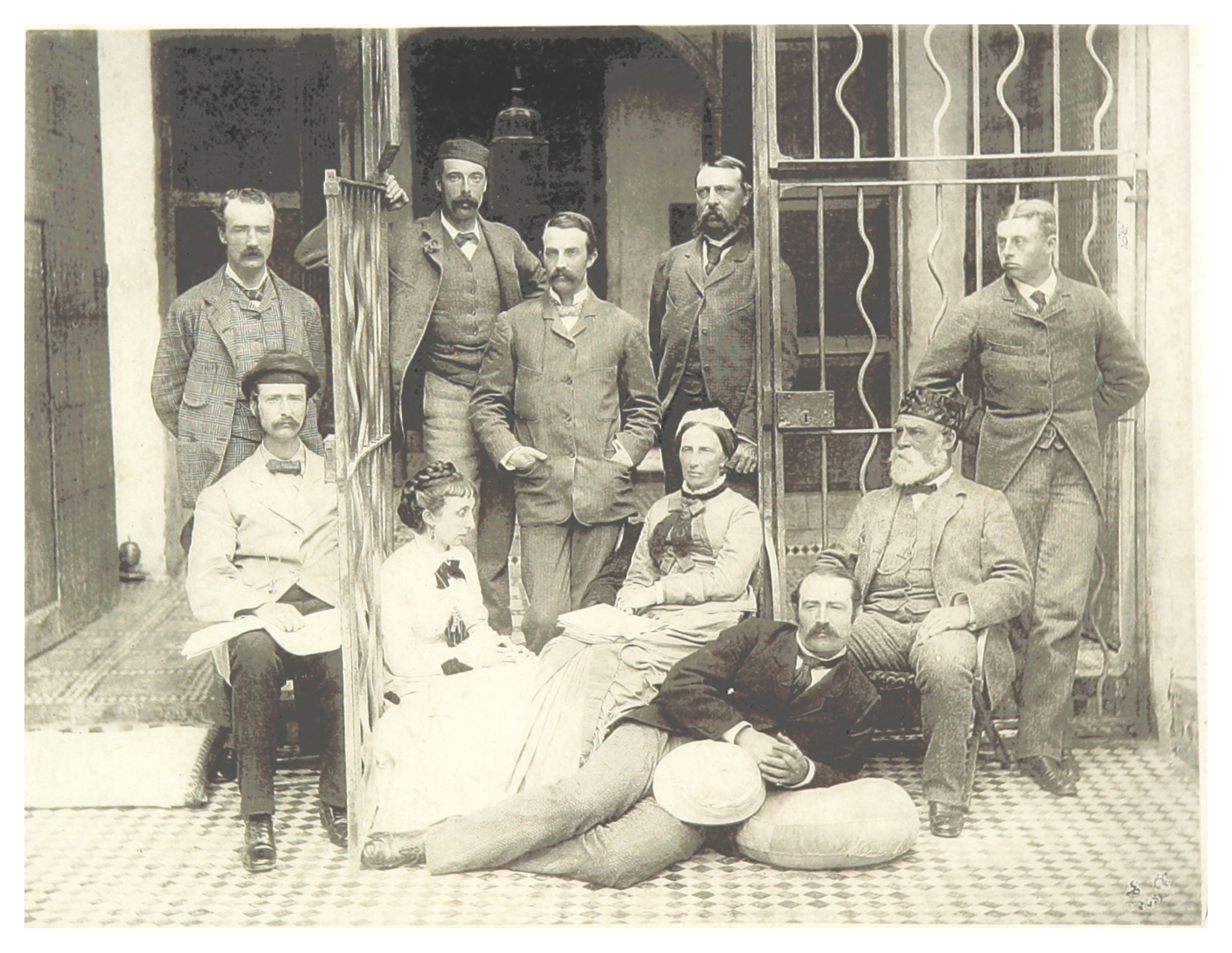
The British mission to Morocco in 1880, led by Sir John Hay Drummond Hay (seated, right).

In 1845, he acted as a mediator between Morocco and Denmark, Sweden, and Spain. In that capacity, he signed the convention which the Sultan concluded with the Court of Madrid. In 1856 he negotiated and signed the Anglo-Moroccan Accords, a general treaty and a commercial convention with the Moroccan government. In 1861 he was promoted to the rank of Minister Resident. In 1862, he helped defuse tensions between the US consul and the European community during the Tangier Difficulty. Hay's further promotion to the rank of Minister Plenipotentiary took place in 1872, and to that of Envoy Extraordinary in 1880.

He was appointed a Knight Grand Cross of the Order of Saint Michael and Saint George (GCMG) in 1884.

In July 1886, he retired on a pension, and was sworn a Privy Councillor. However, even in retirement, he continued to reside privately a great part of the year in Morocco, and continued to exercise significant influence there.

== Personal life ==
On 1 September 1838, Drummond-Hay was married to Sarah Laura Livingston, daughter of Lt.-Col. James Livingston of the East India Company. Before her death on 23 April 1868, they were the parents of:

- Frederic Drummond-Hay (1839–1922), the Vicar at Rolleston and Neston; he married Elizabeth Ann Matthews, daughter of Robert Matthews, in 1865. After her death, he married Emily Fraser Wilkins, a daughter of George Dashwood Wilkins, in 1880. After her death, he married Rosie Bridget Downing Bowles Stancomb, daughter of William Stancomb and Bridget Downing Bowles Hare, in 1919.
- Edward Drummond-Hay (1841–1862), a Lieutenant in the St. Helena Regiment who died unmarried.

After her death, he married Alice Watts, daughter of Edward Watts of Hythe, Kent, in 1869.

He died at Wedderburn Castle, near Duns, in Scotland, on 27 November 1893.

== Writings ==
- Hay, Sir John H. Drummond. 1844. Western Barbary: Its Wild Tribes and Savage Animals. London: John Murray.
- Hay, Sir John H. Drummond. 1888. "Reminiscences of Boar-hunting in Morocco." Murray’s Magazine: A Home and colonial periodical for the general reader, 330-342.
- Brooks, LAE. 1896. A Memoir of Sir John Hay Drummond Hay: Sometime Minister at the Court of Morocco based on His Journals and Correspondence. London: John Murray

Diplomatic posts
Preceded by Edward Drummond-Hay	Envoy Extraordinary and Minister Plenipotentiary of the United Kingdom to Morocco; 1829–1845	Succeeded by Sir William Kirby Green
