= Long Look Estate =

The Long Look Estate in East End, Tortola, British Virgin Islands, claims to be the oldest free black community in the Western world.

== History ==
In 1776 Samuel Nottingham, a Quaker, manumitted 25 slaves and gave them 50 acres (200,000 m^{2}) of land in Long Look in Tortola, directing them to cultivate it for the common good. Quakers were prominent in the abolition movement; Nottingham's action pre-dates the foundation of the Society for Effecting the Abolition of the Slave Trade by more than a decade.

A report made in 1823 by a John Dougan states "So quiet and retired had these Persons lived there, that although I have been for many years residing in the Island, yet I derived no knowledge of the Situation and Circumstances regarding these People..." At the time of Dougan's report, the population of the estate had increased to 43. He further reported that "Not one of them is in debt, and their Property is free from all Incumbrance. That 12 of the grown up Persons are admitted Members of the Westleyan Methodist Society, and with their Children attend regularly the Methodist Chapel at the East End of the Island ... since their Emancipation to the present Day none of them have been sued in Court, or brought before a Magistrate to answer a complaint against them. One of them once obtained a Warrant against a Person who had assaulted him, who begging his Pardon, He forgave Him."

== Currently ==
In 2002 the Virgin Islands legislature passed laws which required residents of the estate to sell their land to other residents of the estate if they were prepared to pay the same price, to preserve the cultural heritage of the area. The measure was not universally popular, as it made it more difficult for land-owning families to sell their property, but it is nonetheless thought to be an important step in securing the historical legacy of the Territory.

The freed slaves (as was common at the time) took the surname of their last owners, and went by the family name of Nottingham. Although many other former slave owners' descendants are still well represented within the Territory, by the twenty-first century no Nottinghams appeared on the voter's roll or the telephone directory.

== See also ==
- Sugar plantations in the Caribbean
