= St John the Baptist's Church, Leenside, Nottingham =

- St John the Baptist's Church, Leenside, Nottingham
- 52°56′59″N 1°8′35″W
- OS grid reference: SK 57674 39490
- Country: England
- Denomination: Church of England
- Churchmanship: Anglo Catholic

History
- Dedication: St John the Baptist

Architecture
- Architect: George Gilbert Scott
- Style: Early English Period
- Completed: 1844
- Construction cost: £4,400
- Closed: 1941

Administration
- Province: York
- Diocese: Diocese of Southwell
- Parish: Nottingham

The church of St John the Baptist, Leenside, Nottingham was opened in 1844 as a parish church in the Church of England. It was destroyed in 1941.

== History ==
The foundation stone for the church of St John the Baptist was laid by Charles Pierrepont, 2nd Earl Manvers on 9 August 1843 and an address was delivered to the onlookers by Archdeacon George Wilkins. It was created out of the parish of St Mary's Church, Nottingham. The architects were George Gilbert Scott and William Bonython Moffatt. The Church Building Commission gave a grant of £800 towards the cost of its construction.

The church was dedicated by Rt. Revd. John Kaye, Bishop of Lincoln on 5 November 1844. It had seating for 800 people and cost £4,400. (equivalent to £483,350 in 2025),

It was built in the Early English Period style in Bulwell stone. The dressings were from quarries at Cromford, Coxbench and Duffield, Derbyshire. The pier capitals were from Mansfield. The parsonage house was built in 1850–51 to the designs of local architect Francis Williamson.

The first incumbent was William Howard 1840 – 1853. Afterwards he became Rector of St Peter's Church, Nottingham. Howard was succeeded by John Montague Valpy in 1853. During the incumbency of Valpy, St John's was the first church in Nottingham to introduce a surpliced choir and choral and week-day celebrations of the Eucharist. Although it was designed for the poor working-class people in the Leenside area of Nottingham, its High Church churchmanship soon attracted a more wealthy middle class congregation from the Park Estate.

In 1911 the extra-parochial area of St James' Church, Standard Hill was added to it.

It was bombed in a Second World War air raid during the Nottingham Blitz on 8–9 May 1941 and later demolished. The parish was joined with that of St George in the Meadows, Nottingham.

== Organ ==
The organ was built by Lloyd and Dudgeon of Nottingham and installed in 1865. It was replaced by an organ by Bishop of London in 1896. It comprised 3 manuals and pedals with 23 speaking stops. It was destroyed in the Nottingham Blitz in 1941.

== Official history via Southwell Diocese ==
Further details of the history of this church, as well as a graphic picture of the aftermath of its tortuous end, can be found via the Churches of Southwell official web portal.
