= Edward Drummond-Hay (Royal Navy officer) =

British colonial Governor (1815–1884)

Sir Edward Hay Drummond-Hay (4 March 1815 – 24 January 1884) was a British naval officer, diplomat and colonial administrator.

== Biography ==
He was born in England, son of Edward Drummond Hay, who was a nephew of the ninth Earl of Kinnoul. Like with his younger brother, John Hay Drummond Hay, he was educated at the Edinburgh Academy and then at Charterhouse. He was a Colonel of the 5th West India Regiment from 6 November 1854 to 15 August 1863.

From 1839 to 1850, he was the President of the British Virgin Islands.

From 1850 to 1855, he was the Governor of Saint Kitts.

From 1855 to 3 July 1863, he was the Governor of Saint Helena.

While he was governor of Saint Helena he devoted much of his attention to public works amongst which were the settlement Rupert's valley and the main drainage works of Jamestown. In 1857 the church of St. John was started, and in 1861 the church of St. Matthew at Hut's Gate was built.

In September 1860, the governor received a visit from Prince Alfred, who was an officer in the Royal Navy serving on H.M.S. Euralus.

Hay was knighted in August 1859.

Government offices
Preceded by Richard Hetherington	President of the British Virgin Islands; 1839–1850	Succeeded by John Cornell Chads
Preceded by Robert James Mackintosh	Lieutenant Governor of Saint Christopher; 1850–1855	Succeeded by Hercules George Robert Robinson
Preceded by Colonel Sir Thomas Gore Browne	Governor of Saint Helena; 1856–1863	Succeeded by Admiral Sir Charles Elliot
