= 2010 in Europe =

This is a list of 2010 events that occurred in Europe.

== Events ==
=== Albania ===
(Albania)

=== Andorra ===
(Andorra)

=== Azerbaijan ===
(Azerbaijan)

=== Belarus ===
(Belarus)

=== Belgium ===
(Belgium)

=== Bosnia and Herzegovina ===
(Bosnia and Herzegovina)

=== Bulgaria ===
(Bulgaria)

=== Croatia ===
(Croatia)

=== Czech Republic ===
(Czech Republic)

=== Cyprus ===
(Cyprus)

=== Denmark ===
(Denmark)

=== Estonia ===
(Estonia)

=== European Union ===
- President of the European Commission: José Manuel Barroso
- President of the Parliament: Jerzy Buzek
- President of the European Council: Herman Van Rompuy
- Presidency of the Council of the EU:
  - Spain (January–July)
  - Belgium (July–December)

=== Finland ===
(Finland)

=== France ===
(France)

=== Germany ===
(Germany)

=== Georgia ===
(Georgia (country))

=== Greece ===
(Greece)

=== Hungary ===
(Hungary)

=== Iceland ===
(Iceland)

=== Ireland ===
(Republic of Ireland)

=== Italy ===
(Italy)

=== Latvia ===
(Latvia)

=== Liechtenstein ===
(Liechtenstein)

=== Lithuania ===
(Lithuania)

=== Luxembourg ===
(Luxembourg)

=== Malta ===
(Malta)

=== Moldova ===
(Moldova)

=== Monaco ===
(Monaco)

=== Montenegro ===
(Montenegro)

=== Netherlands ===
(Netherlands)

=== North Macedonia ===
(North Macedonia)

=== Norway ===
(Norway)

=== Poland ===
(Poland)

=== Portugal ===
(Portugal)

=== Romania ===
(Romania)

=== Russia ===
(Russia)

=== San Marino ===
(San Marino)

=== Serbia ===
(Serbia)

=== Slovakia ===
(Slovakia)

=== Slovenia ===
(Slovenia)

=== Spain ===
(Spain)

=== Sweden ===
(Sweden)

=== Switzerland ===
(Switzerland)

=== Turkey ===
(Turkey)

=== Ukraine ===
(Ukraine)

=== United Kingdom ===
(United Kingdom)

=== Vatican City ===
(Vatican City)

== Events ==
=== January ===
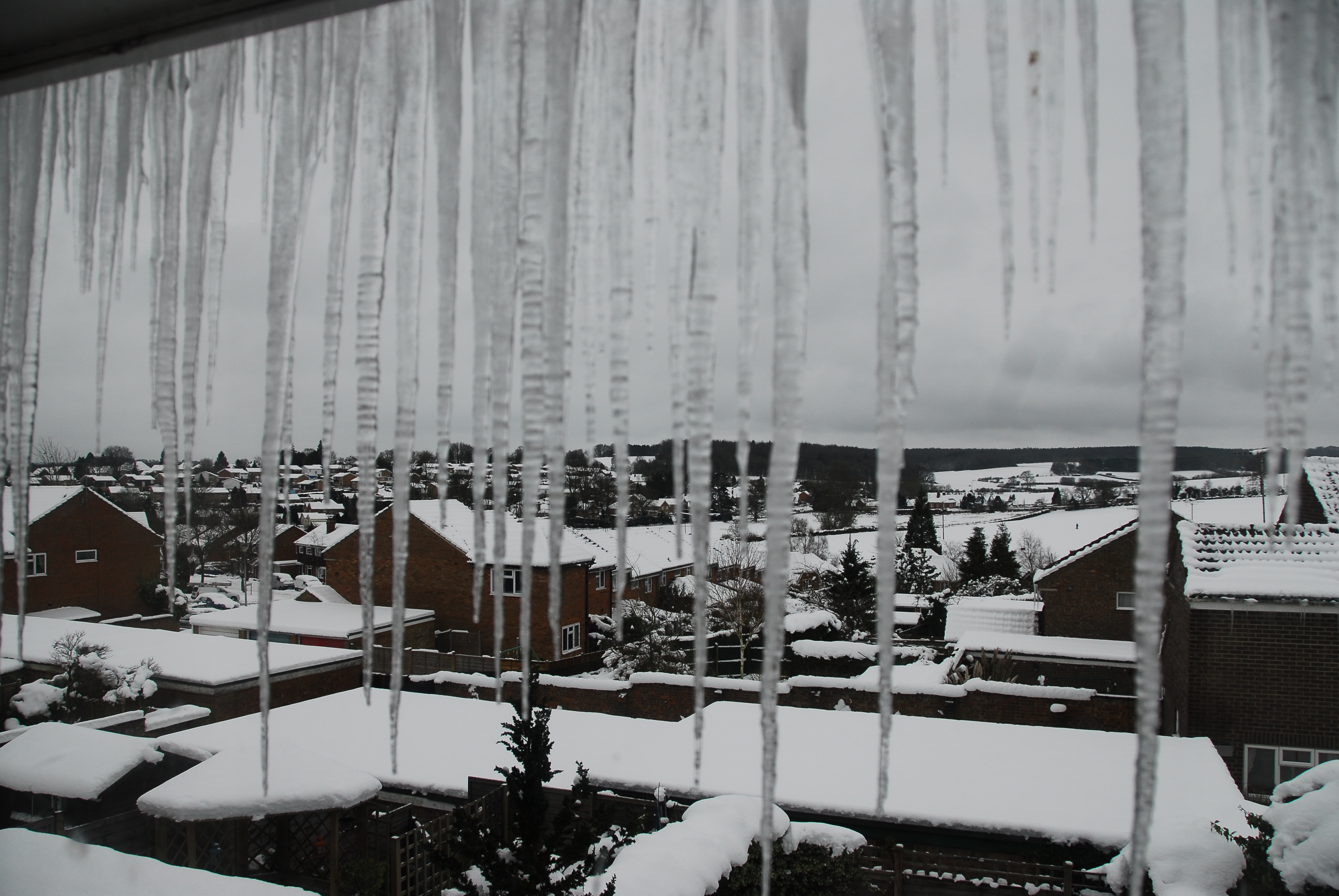
Heavy snowfall in Alton, England

- January 1: Spain assumed the Presidency of the Council of the European Union from Sweden.
- January 3: Two passenger trains collided in Bilecik, Turkey. One train driver was killed and seven passengers were injured.
- January 7: 22 people had died in the UK due to a cold snap.
- January 10: The opposition Social Democrat, Ivo Josipović, won 60.3% of the vote in the second round run-off, beating the mayor of Zagreb, Milan Bandić.
- January 11: More than 5,300 residents in the regions of Shkodër and Lezhë were evacuated due to severe flooding in northern Albania.
- January 25: Ethiopian Airlines Flight 409 crashed into the Mediterranean Sea shortly after take-off from Beirut Rafic Hariri International Airport, killing all 90 people on board.

=== February ===
- February 3: The sculpture L'Homme qui marche I by Alberto Giacometti sells in London for £65 million (US$103.7 million), setting a new world record for a work of art sold at auction.
- February 16: A bus carrying French children on a school trip has overturned in Italy, killing at least three people on board and injuring another 20.
- February 18: A scattered exchange of gunfire on the line of contact dividing Azerbaijani and the Karabakh Armenian military forces left six people dead and one wounded.
- February 25: A collision between two trains in Buizingen, Belgium, left 18 people dead and 162 injured.
- February 26: At least 63 people were killed and one million homes were left without power in western France after cyclone Xynthia crossed Western Europe.

=== March ===
- March 20: 67 people were arrested and several people were injured in Bolton town centre during a clash between members of the English Defence League and Unite Against Fascism.
- March 24: A set of 16 goods wagons runaway for 8 km from a freight station at Alnabru in Oslo to hit and destroy a quayside warehouse. Three people died, and four were seriously injured.
- March 29: At least 40 people died after two female suicide bombers struck the Moscow Metro.
- March 31: A coach crashed into a river after falling from a bridge in a snowstorm in Lanark, Scotland, killing a 17-year-old girl and injuring 44 passengers.

=== April ===
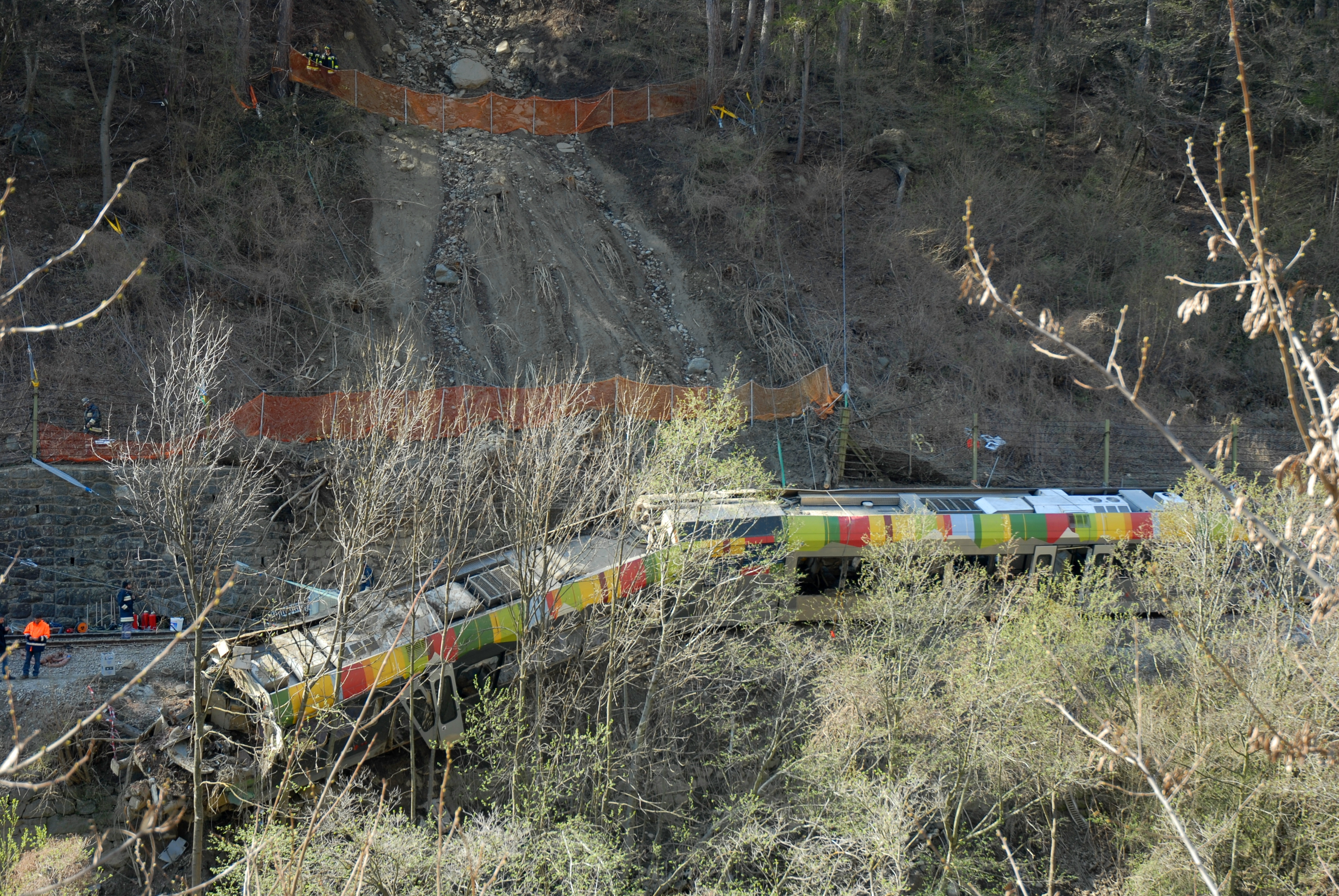
Merano derailment

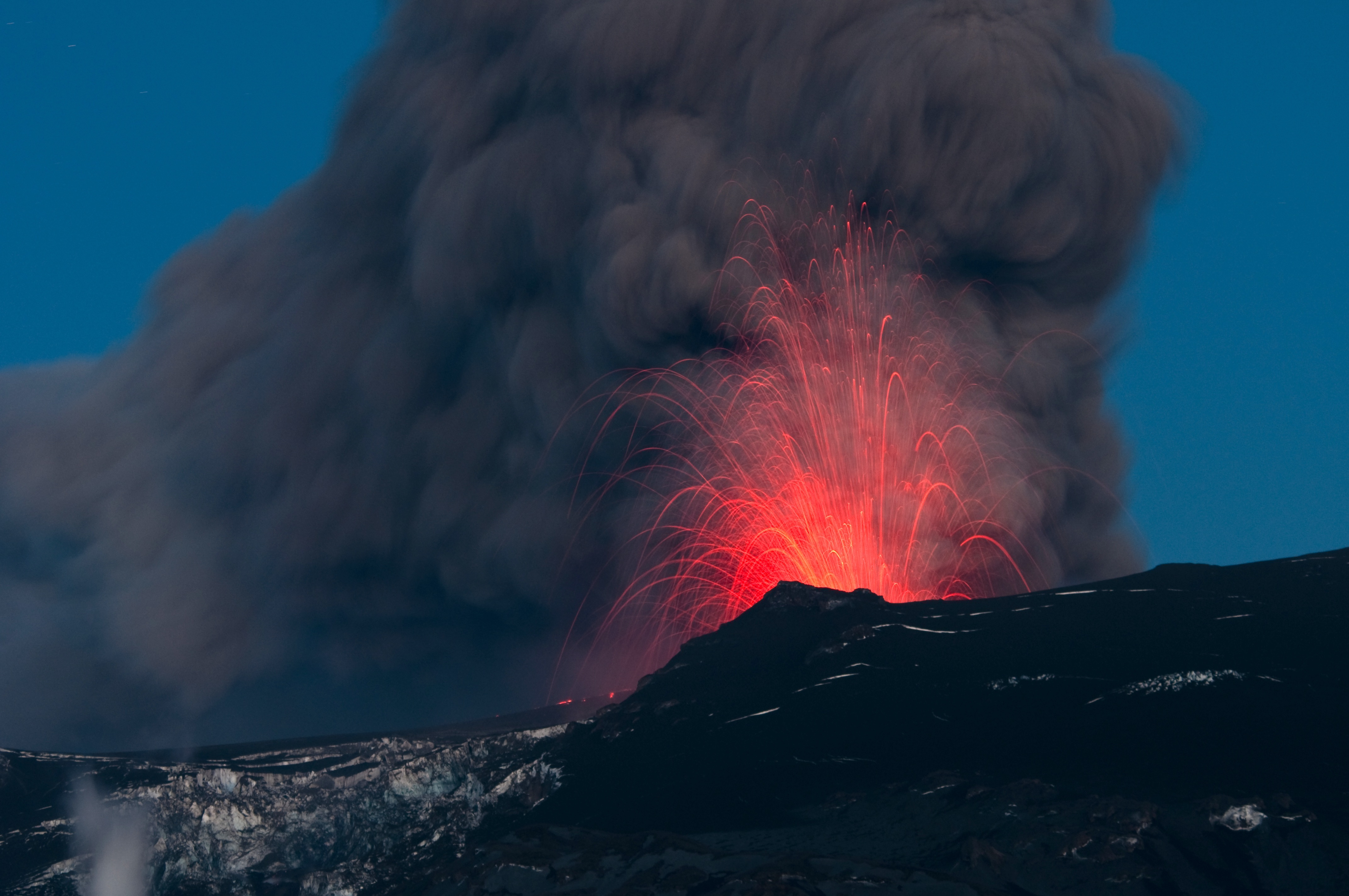
The eruption of Eyjafjallajökull seen from Þórolfsfell

- April 1: A locomotive ran into a stationary passengers tram after its brakes failed during a test ride in Spišská Nová Ves, Slovakia, killing three people and injuring seriously eight others.
- April 10: The President of Poland, Lech Kaczyński, was among 96 killed when their airplane crashed in western Russia.
- April 12: A passenger train was hit by a landslide and partially derailed near Merano, Italy, killing 9 and injuring 28.
- April 14: Over 95,000 flights had been cancelled all across Europe because violent eruptions of Eyjafjallajökull.
- April 25: Austrian candidate for chairmanship, Heinz Fischer, won the presidential election with 79.3% of the valid votes.

=== May ===
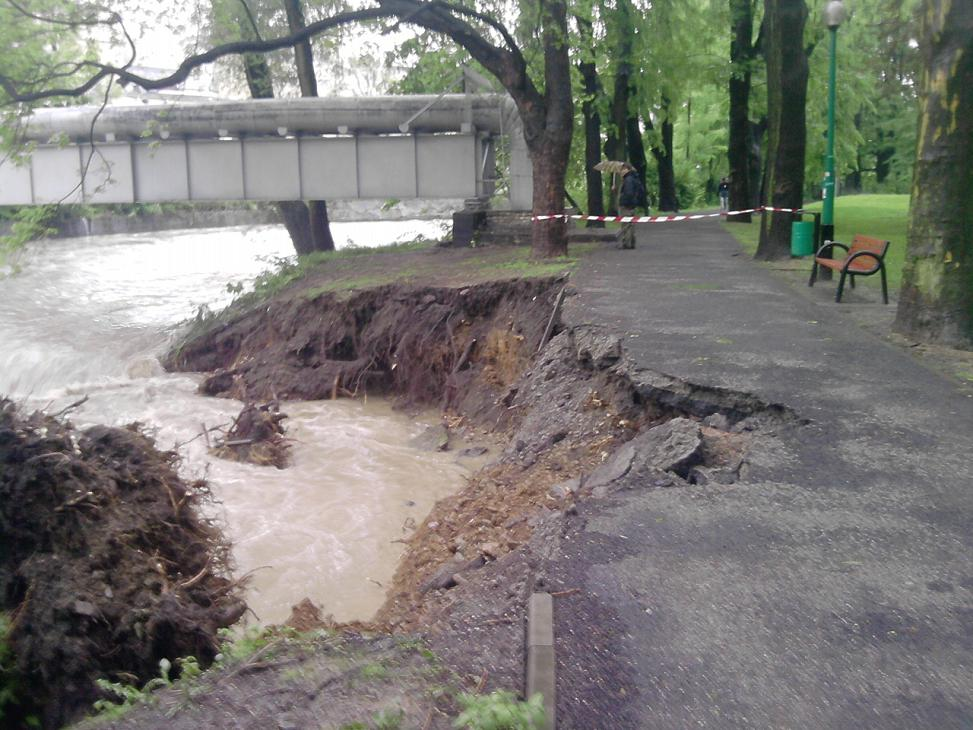
Flooding in Bielsko-Biała

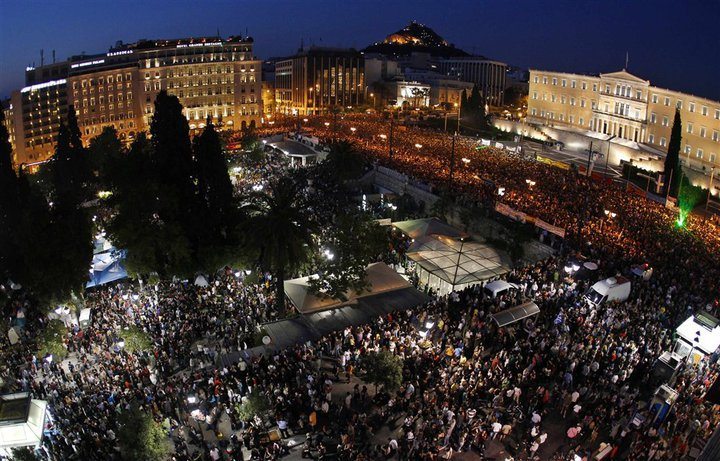
Demonstrators in front of the Greek Parliament, 29 May

- May 5: Up to 500,000 people protested in front of the Greek Parliament amid plans to cut public spending and raise taxes as austerity measures in exchange for a €110 billion bail-out. The protest degenerated in violences between protesters and riot police, resulting in three deaths and dozens of injuries.
- May 14: Throughout Eastern Europe, 21 people were killed in floods triggered by the Windstorm Yolanda.
- May 24: Three people were killed and 35 injured when a Honda Civic car collided with a school bus near Keswick, Cumbria.

=== June ===
- June 2: 13 people were killed and 25 injured in a shooting spree in Cumbria, England.
- June 6: A passenger train collided with boulders that had fallen on the line near Falls of Cruachan, Scotland, derailed and caught fire. Several people were hospitalised and the line was blocked for a week.
- June 15: Heavy rainfall in southern France caused severe floods in the department of Var, resulting in at least 25 deaths.
- June 23: A passenger train struck a group of people who were crossing the railway on the level at Platja de Castelldefels station near Barcelona. Twelve people were killed, and fourteen injured.

=== July ===
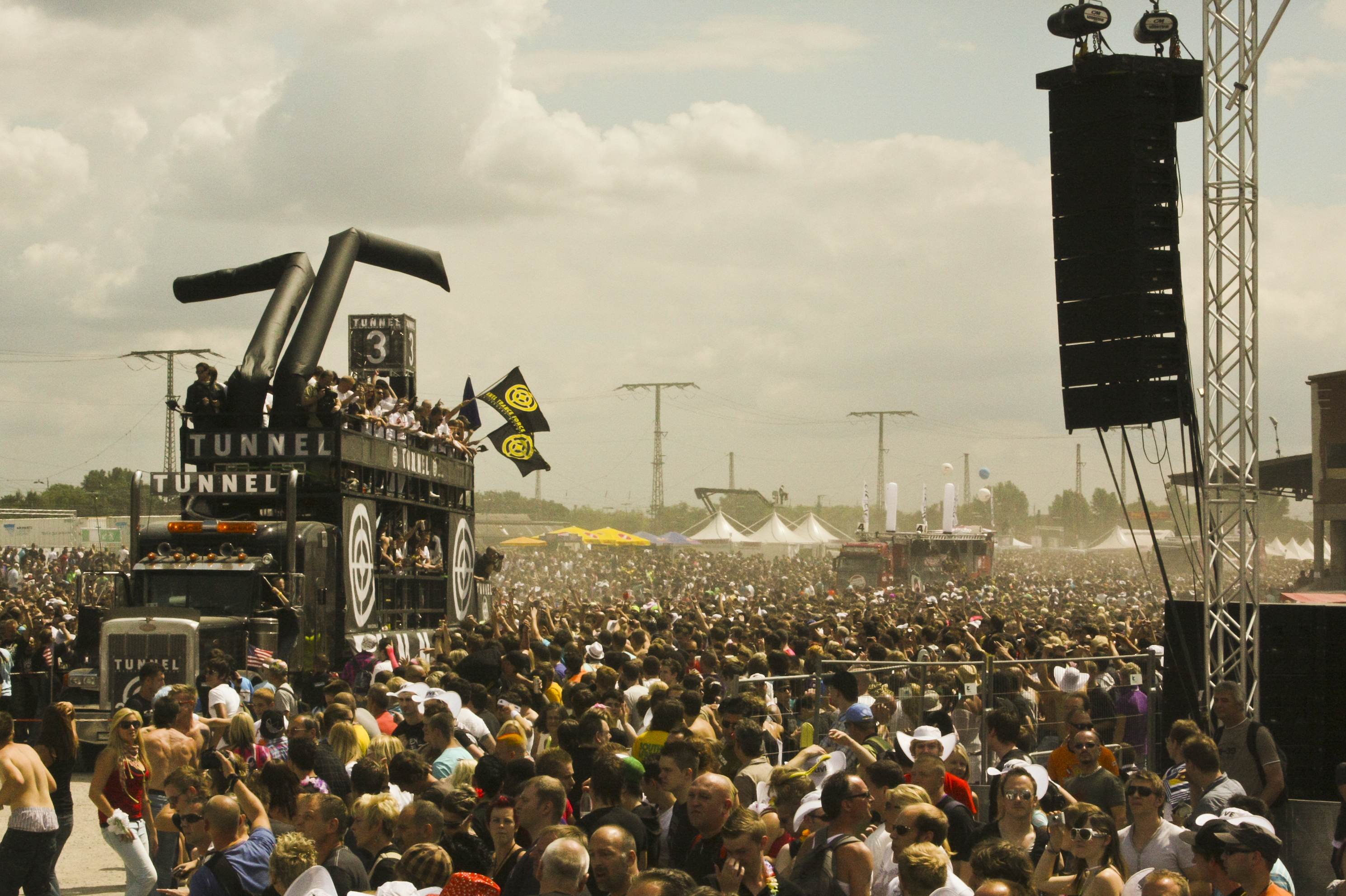
Love Parade disaster

- July 1: Belgium assumed the Presidency of the Council of the European Union from Spain.
- July 11: A traffic accident, near Inishowen, in Ireland, killed eight people.
- July 13: Two trains collided at Korzybie, in north Poland, injuring 36 people.
- July 18: Fourteen people were killed and twelve injured after a bus fell off a cliff in northern Albania, near the city of Durrës.
- July 23: One person was killed and 42 were injured when an eastbound Glacier Express derailed near Fiesch on the Matterhorn Gotthard Bahn.
- July 24: At least 21 people have been killed and 510 more injured in a stampede at the Love Parade dance music festival in the German city of Duisburg.

=== August ===
- August 6: One person died and about 40 were injured in a train derailment in Naples, Italy, on the Circumvesuviana railway.
- August 17
  - A sewage tanker lorry struck and derailed a passenger train on a level crossing at Little Cornard, England. 21 people were injured.
  - The Intercity-Express from Frankfurt to Paris hit a truck that had slid onto the rail near Lambrecht. The first two carriages derailed and ten people were injured.

=== September ===
- September 19:
  - In the 2010 Swedish general election, the nationalist Sweden Democrats won representation in the Swedish Riksdag for the first time. It has held seats, since then.
  - A woman armed with an automatic weapon has shot dead three people and injured 18 others at a hospital in Germany before being killed by police.
- September 26: A Polish tourist bus returning from Spain careered into a bridge on a rain-soaked German motorway, killing 13 people.

=== October ===
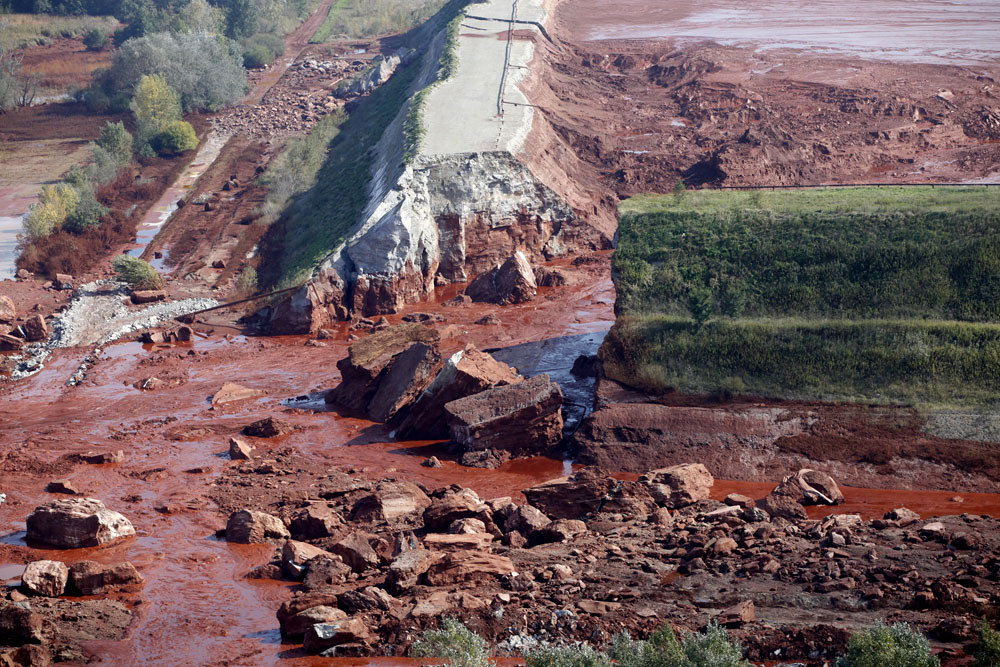
Ajka alumina plant accident

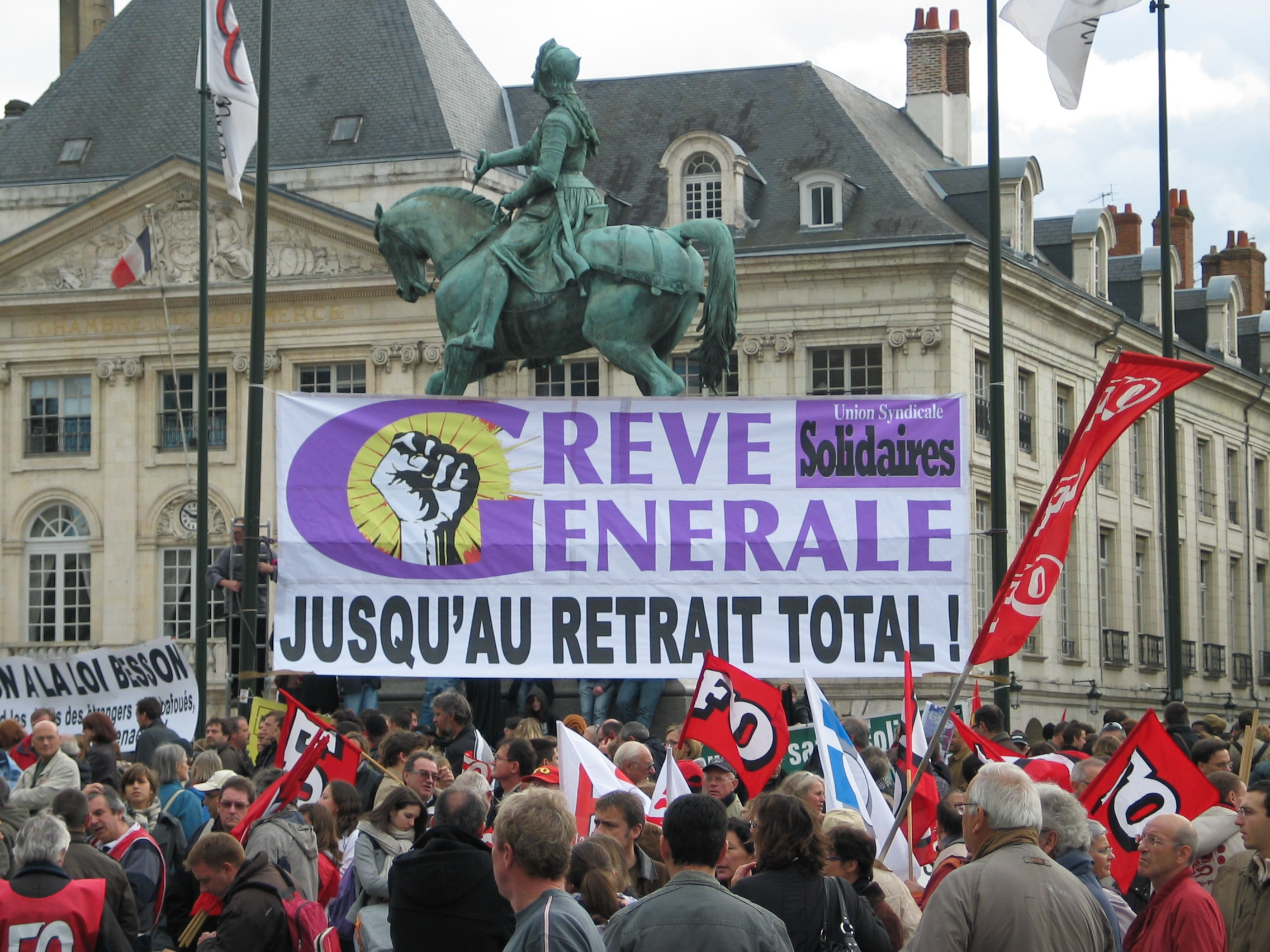
The French Union Solidaires protesting in the Place du Martroi in Orléans

- October 1: 40 people were injured when a train derailed at Skotterud, Norway.
- October 4: Nine people died and 122 were injured in flooding from a ruptured red sludge reservoir at the Ajkai Timföldgyár alumina plant, Hungary.
- October 12
  - A bus packed with rush-hour commuters crashed into a train at a level crossing in Ukraine after jumping a red traffic light, killing 45 people and leaving another 9 wounded.
  - At most 3.5 million people attended a series of demonstrations organised by the French Union leaders throughout France.

=== November ===
- November 11: More than 25,000 students protested in Dublin against increased student fees.

=== December ===
- December 10: Former Prime Minister of Croatia, Ivo Sanader, was arrested in Austria over charges of corruption.

== Date unknown ==
- France becomes the first European country to impose a ban on full-face veils in public areas.

== Deaths ==
January

- January 11
  - Miep Gies, 100, Dutch humanitarian (b. 1909)
  - Eric Rohmer, 89, French film director (b. 1920)
- January 19 - Panajot Pano, 70, Albanian footballer (b. 1939)
- January 22 - Jean Simmons, 80, British actress (b. 1929)

February

- February 1 - Steingrimur Hermannsson, 81, 19th Prime Minister of Iceland (b. 1928)
- February 6 - John Dankworth, 82, British jazz musician and composer (b. 1927)
- February 11 - Alexander McQueen, 40, British fashion designer (b. 1969)
- February 14 - Dick Francis, 89, British author and jockey (b. 1920)

March

- March 3 - Michael Foot, 96, British politician (b. 1913)
- March 12 - Miguel Delibes, 89, Spanish author and journalist (b. 1920)
- March 21 - Wolfgang Wagner, 90, German festival director (b. 1919)
- March 22
  - James Black, 85, British pharmacologist and Nobel Prize laureate (b. 1924)
  - Valentina Tolkunova, 63, Soviet and Russian singer (b. 1946)
- March 27 - Vasily Smyslov, 89, Soviet-Russian chess grandmaster (b. 1921)
- March 30 - Martin Sandberger, 98, German army officer (b. 1911)

April

- April 6 - Corin Redgrave, 70, British actor and political activist (b. 1939)
- April 8 - Malcolm McLaren, 64, British musician and manager (b. 1946)
- April 10
  - Ryszard Kaczorowski, 90, Polish statesman (b. 1919)
  - Lech Kaczynski, 60, President of Poland (b. 1949)
- April 16 - Tomas Spidlik, 90, Czech cardinal (b. 1919)
- April 21 - Juan Antonio Samaranch, 89, Spanish sports official (b. 1920)
- April 25 - Alan Sillitoe, 82, British writer (b. 1928)
- April 30 - Paul Mayer, 98, German cardinal (b. 1911)

May

- May 2 - Lynn Redgrave, 67, British actress (b. 1943)
- May 4 - Luigi Poggi, 92, Italian cardinal (b. 1917)
- May 5 - Giulietta Simionato, 99, Italian opera singer (b. 1910)
- May 8 - Andor Lilienthal, 99, Hungarian chess grandmaster (b. 1911)
- May 15 - Besian Idrizaj, 22, Austrian footballer (b. 1987)
- May 17
  - Bobbejaan Schoepen, 85, Belgian singer (b. 1925)
  - Yvonne Loriod, 86, French pianist (b. 1924)
- May 18 - Edoardo Sanguineti, 79, Italian writer (b. 1930)
- May 31 - Louise Bourgeois, 98, French-born American sculptor (b. 1911)

June

- June 1 - Andrei Voznesensky, 77, Soviet-Russian poet (b. 1933)
- June 2 - Giuseppe Taddei, 93, Italian baritone (b. 1916)
- June 3 - Vladimir Arnold, 72, Soviet-Russian mathematician (b. 1937)
- June 9 - Marina Semyonova, 101, Russian ballerina (b. 1908)
- June 10 - Sigmar Polke, 69, German painter and photographer (b. 1941)
- June 14 - Leonid Kizim, 68, Soviet-Ukrainian cosmonaut (b. 1941)
- June 16 - Ronald Neame, 99, British cinematographer, producer and director (b. 1911)
- June 18
  - Marcel Bigeard, 94, French military officer (b. 1916)
  - Jose Saramago, 87, Portuguese writer and Nobel Prize laureate (b. 1922)
- June 26 - Algirdas Brazauskas, 77, 9th President of Lithuania (b. 1932)

July

- July 2 - Beryl Bainbridge, 76, British novelist (b. 1934)
- July 5 - Cesare Siepi, 87, Italian opera singer (b. 1923)
- July 17 - Bernard Giraudeau, 63, French actor and film director (b. 1947)
- July 24 - Alex Higgins, 61, Northern Irish snooker player (b. 1949)

August

- August 6 - Tony Judt, 62, British historian (b. 1948)
- August 7 - Bruno Cremer, 80, French actor (b. 1923)
- August 12 - Guido de Marco, 79, 6th President of Malta (b. 1931)
- August 16 - Nicola Cabibbo, 75, Italian physicist (b. 1935)
- August 17 - Francesco Cossiga, 82, 63rd Prime Minister and 8th President of Italy (b. 1928)
- August 18 - Carlos Hugo of Bourbon-Parma, 80, Spanish aristocrat (b. 1930)
- August 26 - Raimon Panikkar, 91, Spanish theologian (b. 1918)
- August 27 - Anton Geesink, 76, Dutch judoka (b. 1934)
- August 30 - Alain Corneau, 67, French filmmaker (b. 1943)
- August 31 - Laurent Fignon, 50, French road bicycle racer (b. 1960)

September

- September 9 - Bent Larsen, 75, Danish chess grandmaster (b. 1935)
- September 12 - Claude Chabrol, 80, French film director (b. 1930)
- September 29 - Georges Charpak, 86, French Nobel physicist (b. 1924)

October

- October 4 - Norman Wisdom, 95, British actor and comedian (b. 1915)
- October 9 - Maurice Allais, 99, French Nobel economist (b. 1911)
- October 14 - Benoit Mandelbrot, 85, French-American mathematician (b. 1924)
- October 30 - Harry Mulisch, 83, Dutch writer (b. 1927)

November

- November 2 - Rudolf Barshai, 86, Soviet-Russian conductor and violist (b. 1924)
- November 3 - Viktor Chernomyrdin, 72, 31st Prime Minister of Russia (b. 1938)
- November 5 - Hajo Herrmann, 97, German fighter pilot and lawyer (b. 1913)
- November 10 - Dino De Laurentiis, 91, Italian film producer (b. 1919)
- November 12 - Henryk Gorecki, 76, Polish composer (b. 1933)
- November 13 - Luis Garcia Berlanga, 89, Spanish film director (b. 1921)
- November 17 - Isabelle Caro, 30, French model and actress (b. 1930)
- November 29
  - Bella Akhmadulina, 73, Soviet-Russian poet (b. 1937)
  - Mario Monicelli, 95, Italian actor, screenwriter and director (b. 1915)

December

- December 12 - Tom Walkinshaw, 64, British racing car driver and team owner (b. 1946)
- December 21 - Enzo Bearzot, 83, Italian footballer and coach (b. 1927)

== See also ==
- 2010 in the European Union
- List of state leaders in 2010 § Europe
