= 1763 =

1763 in various calendars
- Gregorian calendar: 1763; MDCCLXIII
- Ab urbe condita: 2516
- Armenian calendar: 1212; ԹՎ ՌՄԺԲ
- Assyrian calendar: 6513
- Balinese saka calendar: 1684–1685
- Bengali calendar: 1169–1170
- Berber calendar: 2713
- British Regnal year: 3 Geo. 3 – 4 Geo. 3
- Buddhist calendar: 2307
- Burmese calendar: 1125
- Byzantine calendar: 7271–7272
- Chinese calendar: 壬午年 (Water Horse); 4460 or 4253 — to — 癸未年 (Water Goat); 4461 or 4254
- Coptic calendar: 1479–1480
- Discordian calendar: 2929
- Ethiopian calendar: 1755–1756
- Hebrew calendar: 5523–5524
- Hindu calendars
- Vikram Samvat: 1819–1820
- Shaka Samvat: 1684–1685
- Kali Yuga: 4863–4864
- Holocene calendar: 11763
- Igbo calendar: 763–764
- Iranian calendar: 1141–1142
- Islamic calendar: 1176–1177
- Japanese calendar: Hōreki 13 (宝暦１３年)
- Javanese calendar: 1688–1689
- Julian calendar: Gregorian minus 11 days
- Korean calendar: 4096
- Minguo calendar: 149 before ROC 民前149年
- Nanakshahi calendar: 295
- Thai solar calendar: 2305–2306
- Tibetan calendar: ཆུ་ཕོ་རྟ་ལོ་ (male Water-Horse); 1889 or 1508 or 736 — to — ཆུ་མོ་ལུག་ལོ་ (female Water-Sheep); 1890 or 1509 or 737

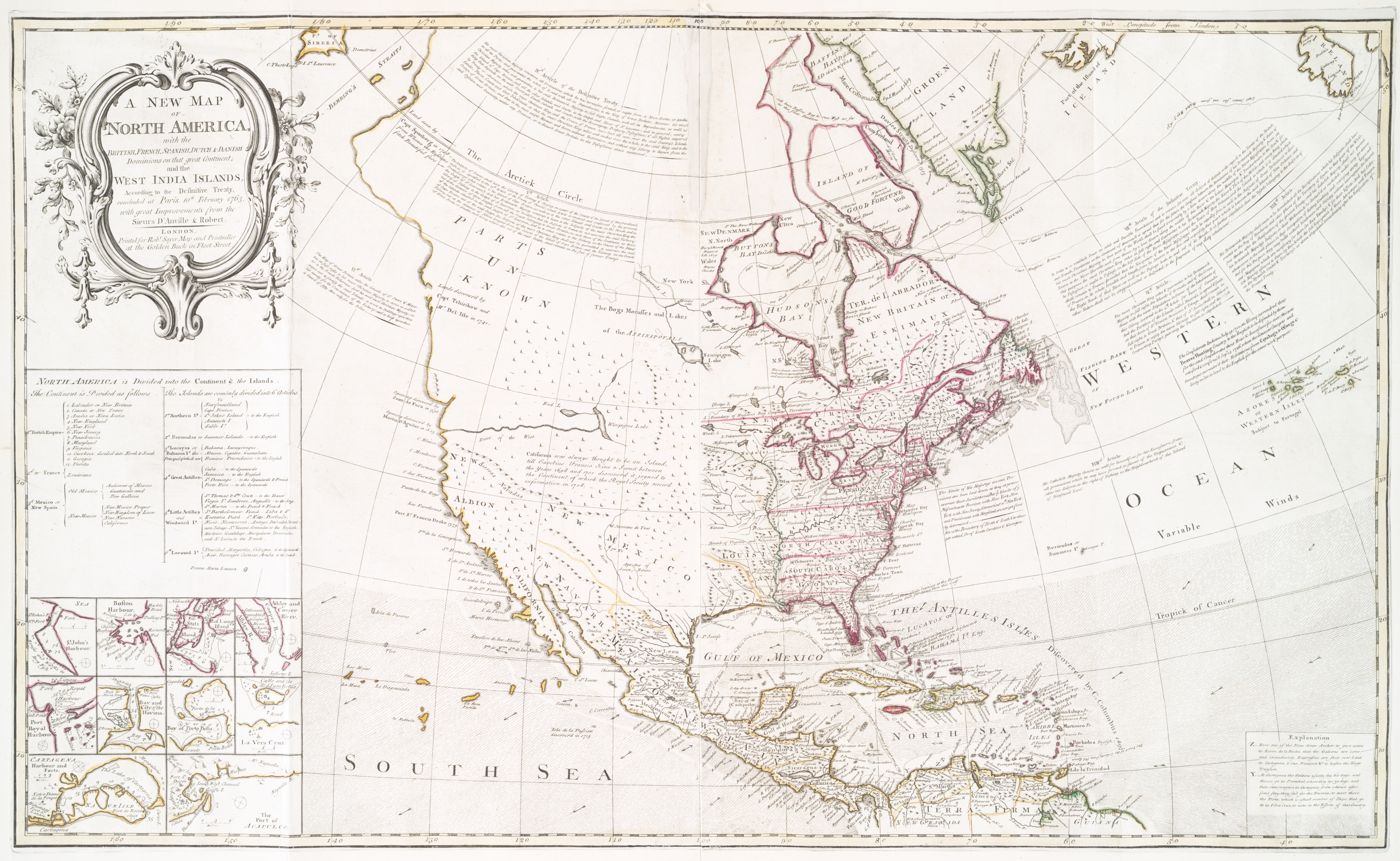
February 10: France cedes all Canadian territory to Great Britain as Treaty of Paris is signed.

1763 (MDCCLXIII) was a common year starting on Saturday of the Gregorian calendar and a common year starting on Wednesday of the Julian calendar, the 1763rd year of the Common Era (CE) and Anno Domini (AD) designations, the 763rd year of the 2nd millennium, the 63rd year of the 18th century, and the 4th year of the 1760s decade. As of the start of 1763, the Gregorian calendar was 11 days ahead of the Julian calendar, which remained in localized use until 1923.

== Events ==
=== January–March ===
- January 27 – The seat of colonial administration in the Viceroyalty of Brazil is moved from Salvador to Rio de Janeiro.
- February 1 – The colonial authorities in the Province of North Carolina establish Mecklenburg County from the western portion of Anson County. The county is named for Charlotte of Mecklenburg-Strelitz, who married George III in 1761.
- February 10 – Seven Years' War – French and Indian War: The Treaty of Paris ends the war, and France cedes Canada (New France) to Great Britain.
- February 15 – The Treaty of Hubertusburg puts an end to the Seven Years' War between Prussia and Austria, and their allies France and Russia.
- February 23 – The Berbice Slave Uprising starts in the former Dutch colony of Berbice.
- March 1 – Charles Townshend becomes President of the Board of Trade in the British government.

=== April–June ===
- April 6 – The Théâtre du Palais-Royal, home to the Paris Opera for almost 90 years, is destroyed in an accidental fire.
- April 16 – George Grenville takes office as the new Prime Minister of Great Britain, after the Earl of Bute resigns amid criticism over Britain's concessions in the Treaty of Paris.
- April 18 – Marie-Josephte Corriveau is hanged near her home at Saint-Vallier, Quebec before being gibbeted after being found guilty by a military tribunal of twelve officers of murdering her husband. She becomes famous in French Canadian folklore as "la Corriveau".
- April 19 – Teedyuscung, known as the "King of the Delaware Indians" (the Lenape tribe) is assassinated by arsonists who burn down his home in Pennsylvania while he is sleeping, in an apparent retaliation for signing the Treaty of Easton to relinquish Lenape claims to the Province of New Jersey.
- April 23 – The controversial Issue 45 of John Wilkes's satirical newspaper The North Briton is published as a response to a speech four days earlier by King George III praising the end of the Seven Years' War. In what will become a test case for freedom of speech, Wilkes, a member of Parliament, is arrested for libel of the King and imprisoned, then flee to France.
- April 27 – Outraged by the British success in taking control of land in North America formerly occupied by the French, Pontiac, chief of the Odawa people, convenes a conference near Detroit and convinces the leaders of 17 other nations of the need to attack British outposts.
- May 7 – Chief Pontiac begins "Pontiac's War" by attacking the British garrison at Fort Detroit, but the surprise attack is given away by a young native girl who informs the British of the plan. Two days later he begins the Siege of Fort Detroit.
- June 2 – Pontiac's War: At what becomes Mackinaw City, Michigan, Chippewas capture Fort Michilimackinac by diverting the garrison's attention with a game of lacrosse, then chasing a ball into the fort.
- June 28 – A magnitude 6.2 earthquake shakes Hungary and Slovakia, with a maximum Mercalli intensity of IX (Violent). Damage is limited, but 83 are killed.

=== July–September ===
- July 7 – The British East India Company declares Mir Qasim, the Nawab of Bengal, to be deposed.
- July 9 – The Mozart family grand tour of Europe began, lifting the profile of child prodigy Wolfgang Amadeus.
- July 28 {O.S. July 17) – The Russo-Circassian War begins, when the Russian Empire attempts to annex Circassia.
- August 2 – Mir Qasim is routed at Odwa Nala. He flees to Patna, where he massacres the English garrison, but is subsequently defeated at Katwa, Murshidabad, Giria, Sooty, Udayanala and Munger.
- August 3 and 4 – Amsterdam banking crisis: The spectacular bankruptcies of Leendert Pieter de Neufville and Johann Ernst Gotzkowsky lead to a financial contagion which in the following days affects many merchants in Amsterdam, Hamburg, Berlin and Stockholm.
- August 5 – Pontiac's War: Battle of Bushy Run – British forces led by Henry Bouquet defeat Chief Pontiac's Indians at Bushy Run, in the Pennsylvania backcountry.
- August – Fire in Smyrna, Ottoman Empire, destroys 2,600 houses.
- September 1 – Empress Catherine the Great of Russia endorses Ivan Betskoy's plans for a Foundling Home in Moscow.

=== October–December ===
- October 7 – The Royal Proclamation of 1763 is issued by George III of Great Britain, restricting the westward expansion of British North America, and stabilizing relations with the indigenous peoples of the Americas, by barring white settlement of lands west of the Appalachian Mountains.
- November 24 – Bayes' theorem is first announced.
- December 2 – Touro Synagogue, Newport, Rhode Island, is dedicated; by the end of the 20th century, this will be the oldest surviving synagogue in North America.
- December 14 – The Paxton Boys massacre six Conestoga Indians in their homes in Lancaster County, Pennsylvania. When the 16 survivors are sheltered in the Lancaster workhouse (jail), the Paxton Boys ride into town and kill them as well, on December 27.

=== Date unknown ===
- The Prussian education system is instituted as a compulsory system for boys and girls from age 5 to 13–14 by the Generallandschulreglement (General School Regulation), a decree of Frederick the Great authored by Johann Julius Hecker.
- Little Hagia Sophia in Istanbul, Ottoman Empire, is damaged in an earthquake.
- Joseph Haydn writes his Symphony No. 12 and Symphony No. 13 (August–December) for Nikolaus I, Prince Esterházy; also, at about this date, his Symphony No. 40.

== Births ==
- January 8
  - Edmond-Charles Genêt, French ambassador to the United States during the French Revolution (d. 1834)
  - Jean-Baptiste Drouet, French revolutionary politician (d. 1824)
- January 24 – Louis Alexandre Andrault de Langeron, Russian general (d. 1831)

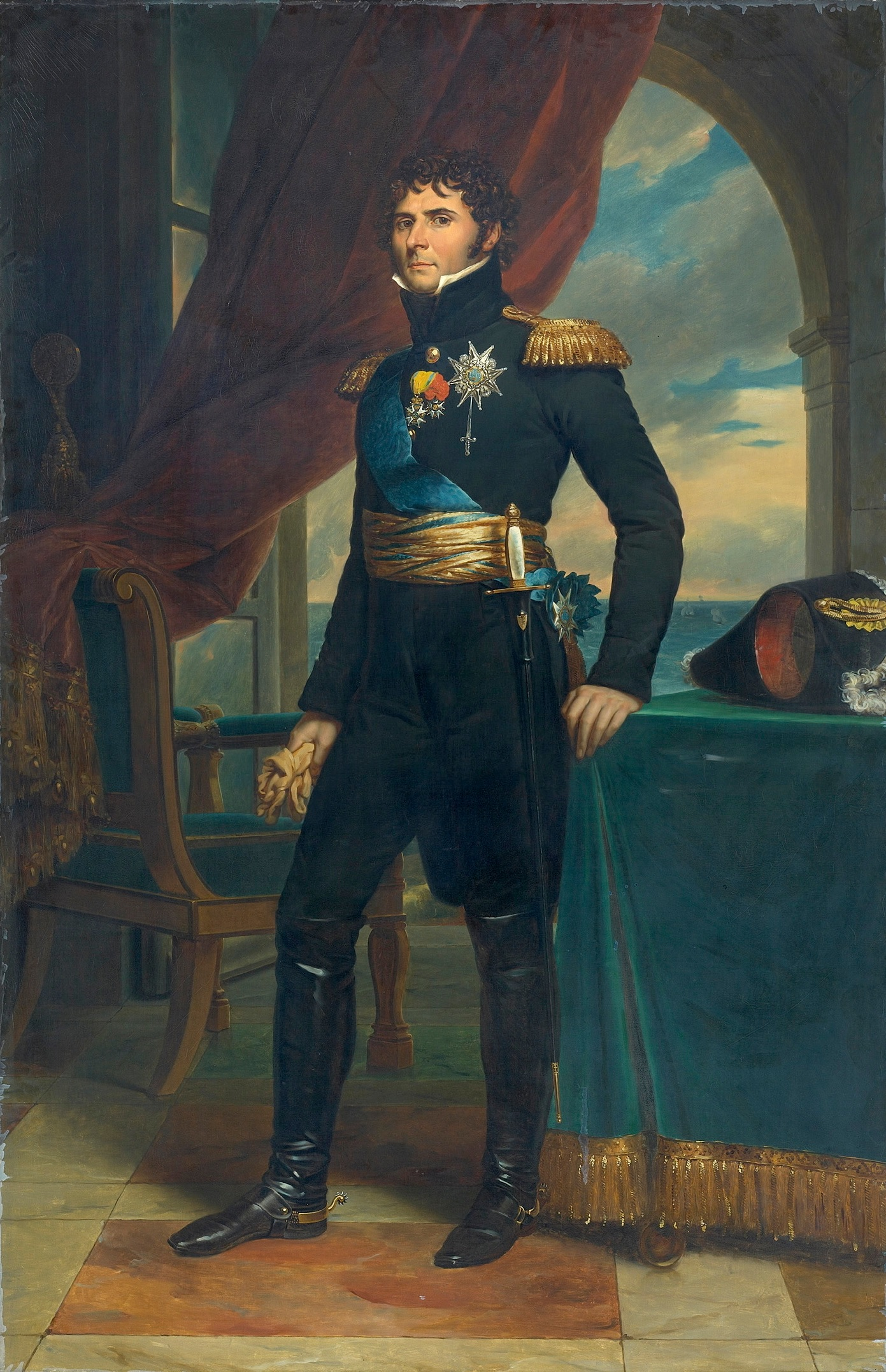
Jean-Baptiste Bernadotte

- January 26 – Jean-Baptiste Bernadotte, Marshal of France, King Charles XIV John of Sweden and Charles III John of Norway (d. 1844)
- February 14 – Jean Victor Marie Moreau, French general (d. of wounds 1813)
- February 20 – Adalbert Gyrowetz, Bohemian composer (d. 1850)
- March 9 – William Cobbett, English journalist, author (d. 1835)
- March 13 – Guillaume-Marie-Anne Brune, Marshal of France (k. 1815)
- March 20 – Charles Sturt, English politician (d. 1812)
- March 21 – Jean Paul, German writer (d. 1825)
- May 7 – Józef Antoni Poniatowski, Polish prince, Marshal of France (d. 1813)
- June 20 – Theobald Wolfe Tone, Irish patriot (executed 1798)

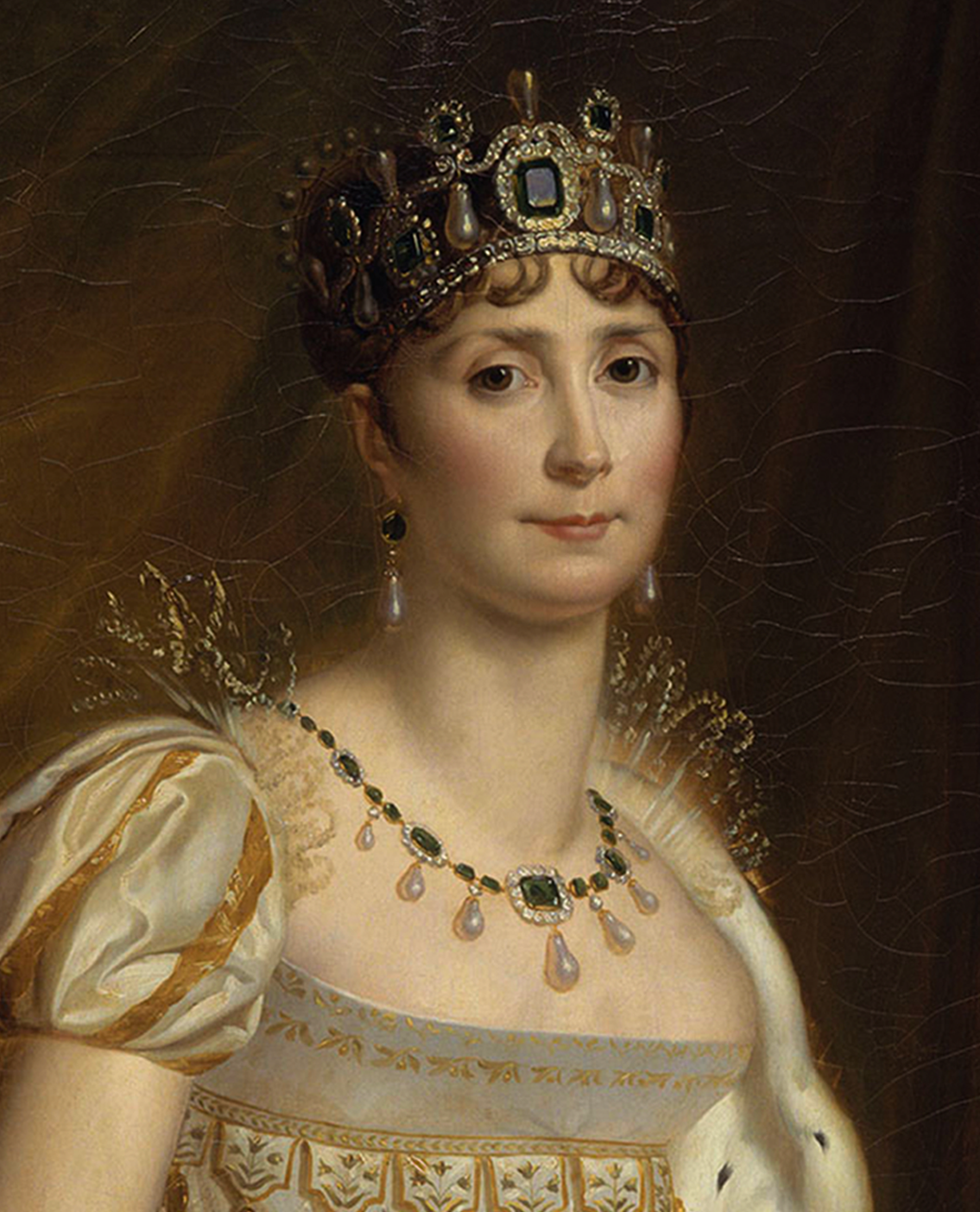
Joséphine de Beauharnais

- June 23 – Joséphine de Beauharnais, born Marie Josèphe Rose Tascher de La Pagerie, Martinique-born French empress consort (d. 1814)
- July 17 – John Jacob Astor, German-born American entrepreneur (d. 1848)
- August 5 – Bill Richmond, American-born British boxer (d. 1829)
- August 13 – Christoph Johann von Medem, German courtier (d. 1838)
- August 16 – Prince Frederick, Duke of York and Albany, second son of George III of Great Britain (d. 1827)
- August 17 – Dmitry Senyavin, Russian admiral (d. 1831)
- September 2 – Caroline Schelling, German scholar, intellectual (d. 1809)
- December 25 – Claude Chappe, French telecommunication pioneer (d. 1805)
- December 28 – John Molson, Canadian entrepreneur (d. 1836)
- December 31 – Pierre-Charles Villeneuve, French admiral (suicide 1806)
- Date unknown – Huang Pilie, Chinese bibliophile (d. 1825)

== Deaths ==
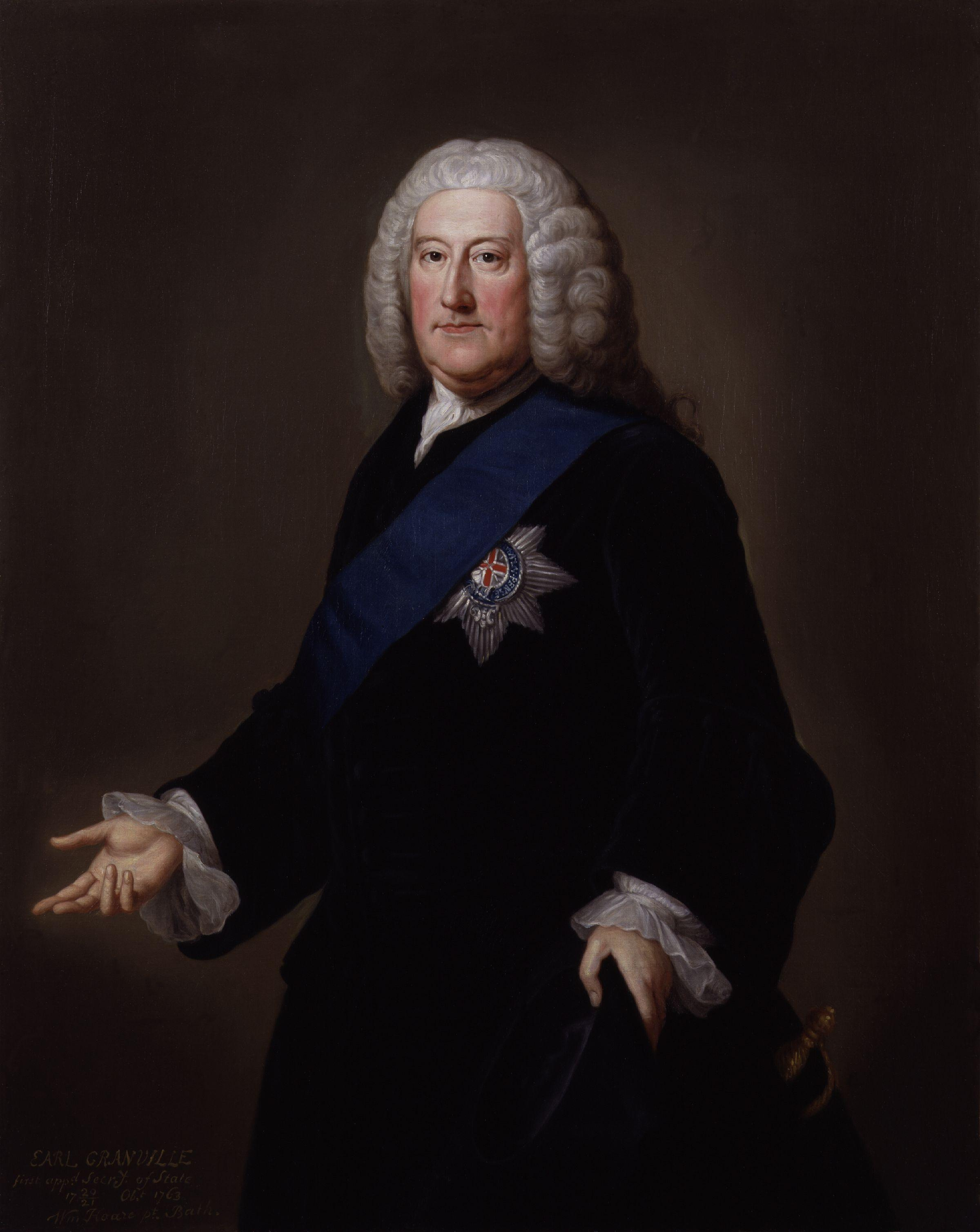
John Carteret, 2nd Earl Granville

- January 2 – John Carteret, 2nd Earl Granville, English statesman (b. 1690)
- January 11 – Caspar Abel, German theologian, historian, and poet (b. 1676)
- January 29 – Louis Racine, French poet (b. 1692)
- February 11 – William Shenstone, English poet (b. 1714)
- February 12 – Pierre de Marivaux, French writer (b. 1688)
- February 26 – Frederick, Margrave of Brandenburg-Bayreuth (b. 1711)
- March 2 – Antoine Walsh, Irish-French slave trader and Jacobite (b. 1703)
- March 4 – Johan Hörner, Danish artist (b. 1711)
- March 24 – Catherine Charlotte De la Gardie, Swedish countess (b. 1723)
- March 31 – Abraham Darby II, English ironmaster (b. 1711)
- April 8
  - Koca Ragıp Pasha, Ottoman (Turkish) Grand Vizier (b. 1698)
  - Ann Beddingfield, English mariticide, executed (b. 1742)
- April 13 – James Waldegrave, 2nd Earl Waldegrave of Great Britain (b. 1715)
- April 22 – Jared Eliot, Connecticut farmer, writer on horticulture (b. 1685)
- May 3 – George Psalmanazar, French-born impostor and English writer (b. c. 1679)
- June 29 – Hedvig Charlotta Nordenflycht, Swedish writer (b. 1718)
- August 14 – Giovanni Battista Somis, Italian violinist and composer (b. 1686)
- August 21 – Charles Wyndham, 2nd Earl of Egremont, British statesman (b. 1710)
- September 20 – Gabriela Silang, Filipina rebel leader, heroine (b. 1731)
- September 26 – John Byrom, English poet (b. 1692)
- October – Anna Maria Garthwaite, British designer (b. 1688)
- October 5 – Augustus, Elector of Saxony, King of Poland and Grand Duke of Lithuania (b. 1696)
- October 28 – Heinrich von Brühl, German statesman (b. 1700)
- November 10 – Joseph Dupleix – French governor general at Pondichéry (b. 1697)
- November 23 – Friedrich Heinrich von Seckendorff, German soldier (b. 1673)
- November 28 – Naungdawgyi, Burmese king (b. 1734)
- December 3 – Carl August Thielo, Danish composer (b. 1702)
- December 17 – Frederick Christian, Elector of Saxony (b. 1722)
- December 23 – Antoine François Prévost, French writer (b. 1697)
