= Bedingfield (surname) =

Bedingfield is an English surname. Notable people with the surname include:

- Anthony Bedingfield (died 1651), English merchant and politician
- Daniel Bedingfield (born 1979), New Zealand-born British pop singer-songwriter
- Edmund Bedingfield (1479–1553), English knight
- Eric Bedingfield (born 1967), American politician
- Frank Bedingfield (1877–1904), English footballer with Aston Villa, Queens Park Rangers and Portsmouth in the 1890s and 1900s
- Gary Bedingfield (born 1963), British-born baseball historian
- Glenn Bedingfield (born 1974), Maltese politician
- Henry Bedingfield (disambiguation)
- James Bedingfield (1924–2022), American lawyer and politician
- Kate Bedingfield (born 1981), American political advisor
- Margery Beddingfield (1742–1763), British criminal
- Eric Bedingfield (born 1967), American politician
- Natasha Bedingfield (born 1981), British pop singer
- Nikola Bedingfield (born 1983), British pop singer
- Oriana Bedingfield (born 1984), Maltese footballer

== See also ==
- Bedingfeld
