= Bedingfield =

Bedingfield may refer to:

- Bedingfield, Suffolk, a village in England
- Bedingfield (surname), an English surname (includes a list of people with the name)
- Bedingfield, Georgia, town in Georgia, U.S.

== See also ==
- Bedingfeld, a surname
