= Morrie Martin =

American baseball player (1922–2010)

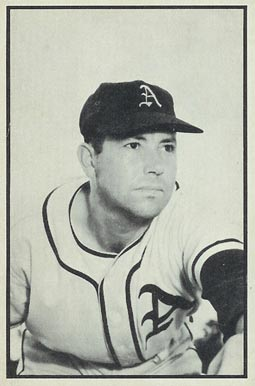
- Pitcher
- Born: September 3, 1922; Dixon, Missouri, U.S.
- Died: May 24, 2010 (aged 87); Washington, Missouri, U.S.
- Batted: Left Threw: Left

MLB debut
- April 25, 1949, for the Brooklyn Dodgers

Last MLB appearance
- April 22, 1959, for the Chicago Cubs

MLB statistics
- Win–loss record: 38–34
- Earned run average: 4.29
- Strikeouts: 245
- Stats at Baseball Reference

Teams
- Brooklyn Dodgers (1949); Philadelphia Athletics (1951–1954); Chicago White Sox (1954–1956); Baltimore Orioles (1956); St. Louis Cardinals (1957–1958); Cleveland Indians (1958); Chicago Cubs (1959)

Morris Webster Martin (September 3, 1922 – May 24, 2010), nicknamed "Lefty", was an American professional baseball player. The left-handed pitcher worked in 250 games in Major League Baseball over ten seasons with the Brooklyn Dodgers (1949), Philadelphia Athletics (1951–1954), Chicago White Sox (1954–1956), Baltimore Orioles (1956), St. Louis Cardinals (1957–1958), Cleveland Indians (1958) and Chicago Cubs (1959). Martin was born in Dixon, Missouri; he was listed as standing 6 feet (1.8 m) tall and weighing 173 pounds (78 kg).

Martin's professional career began in 1941 in the White Sox' organization. After two seasons, including 25 games in the top-level American Association, he entered the United States Army. Assigned to the First Army's 49th Combat Engineers, he participated in Operation Torch, Operation Overlord, Operation Cobra and the Battle of the Bulge. According to Gary Bedingfield's Baseball in Wartime, Martin was badly wounded in action at least twice: "At the Battle of the Bulge, he suffered a bullet wound to the thigh and nearly lost a leg after gangrene set in. It took more than 150 shots of penicillin to spare him from an amputation."

However, Martin was able to return to baseball in 1946, the first full peacetime season. Now a member of the Brooklyn farm system, he had his first MLB trial with the pennant-bound 1949 Dodgers, appearing in ten games, including four starts. After spending 1950 back in the minor leagues, he was selected by the Philadelphia Athletics in the Rule 5 draft and had a sparkling 1951 campaign, winning 11 of 15 decisions (.733) for a sixth-place team that played at only a .455 pace over the entire season. Along the way, Martin threw his only big-league shutout, a five-hitter against the Detroit Tigers at Briggs Stadium on July 19. He became more of a relief specialist as his big-league career progressed.

In his 250-game MLB career, Martin posted a 38–34 won–lost mark, 15 saves, eight complete games and a 4.29 earned run average. In 6042/3 innings pitched, he permitted 607 hits and 249 bases on balls, with 245 strikeouts. He retired after the 1960 minor-league season and died in Washington, Missouri, at age 87 in 2010.
