= Redlingfield Priory =

Medieval nunnery in Redlingfield, Suffolk, England

Redlingfield Priory was a medieval nunnery in Redlingfield, Suffolk, England. It was closed in the 1530s. The last prioress, Grace Samson, was awarded a pension, and the estate was given or sold to Sir Edmund Bedingfield.

The priory was founded by Emma de Arras, Countess of Guisnes, a daughter of the Lord of Redlingfield, after the Norman Conquest in 1120. There are some remains, including fish ponds and a building that is now a barn. When the priory closed, its property included an antiphoner, a gradual, an organ in the quire of the priory chapel. There were six nuns, two priests, two shepherds or hinds, and four female servants.

Some of the lead used to roof the priory was sold to Sir Anthony Denny, and Edmund Bedingfield disputed his rights to lead remaining at Redlingfield. More lead from Redlingfield was acquired by Nicholas Bacon for his building projects.

The parish church, which dates back to Anglo-Saxon times, is thought to have been used by nuns.
