= Listed buildings in Little Cornard =

Civil Parish in Suffolk, England

Little Cornard is a village and civil parish in the Babergh District of Suffolk, England. It contains 16 listed buildings that are recorded in the National Heritage List for England. Of these one is grade I, four are grade II* and 15 are grade II.

This list is based on the information retrieved online from Historic England.

== Key ==
| Grade | Criteria |
|---|---|
| I | Buildings that are of exceptional interest |
| II* | Particularly important buildings of more than special interest |
| II | Buildings that are of special interest |

== Listing ==
| Name | Grade | Location | Type | Completed (Note: The date given is the date used by Historic England as significant for the initial building or that of an important part in the structure's description.) | Date designated | Grid ref. (Note: The grid reference is based on the British national grid reference system, sometimes known as OSGB36, used by the Ordnance Survey.) Geo-coordinates | Notes | Entry number (Note: The "List Entry Number" is a unique number assigned to each listed building and scheduled monument by Historic England.) | Image | Wikidata |
|---|---|---|---|---|---|---|---|---|---|---|
| Church of All Saints | I | | church building | | 23 March 1961 | TL9016639096; 52°01′04″N 0°46′12″E | | 1181529 | Church of All Saints More images | Q17542171 |
| Outbuildings Formerly to Costen's Hall | II | | | | 9 February 1978 | TL9039438352; 52°00′39″N 0°46′22″E | | 1036602 | Upload Photo | Q26288284 |
| Peacock Hall | II | | | | 10 January 1953 | TL9006239049; 52°01′02″N 0°46′06″E | | 1181530 | Upload Photo | Q26476846 |
| Wall to Walled Garden at Peacocks Hall | II | | | | 9 February 1978 | TL9002739102; 52°01′04″N 0°46′04″E | | 1351827 | Upload Photo | Q26634895 |
| Blacksmiths Cottage | II | Bures Road | | | 9 February 1978 | TL8876938336; 52°00′41″N 0°44′57″E | | 1351828 | Upload Photo | Q26634896 |
| Burnthouse Farmhouse | II | Bures Road | | | 19 March 1975 | TL8943937273; 52°00′06″N 0°45′30″E | | 1036559 | Upload Photo | Q26288241 |
| Mere House | II | Bures Road | | | 9 February 1978 | TL8855938827; 52°00′57″N 0°44′47″E | | 1036558 | Upload Photo | Q26288239 |
| Stone Farmhouse | II | Bures Road | | | 9 February 1978 | TL8864538705; 52°00′53″N 0°44′51″E | | 1036557 | Upload Photo | Q26288238 |
| Pump Cottage | II | Spout Lane | | | 9 February 1978 | TL8957037194; 52°00′03″N 0°45′37″E | | 1351829 | Upload Photo | Q26634897 |
| Spout Farmhouse | II | Spout Lane | | | 9 February 1978 | TL8969037207; 52°00′03″N 0°45′43″E | | 1036561 | Upload Photo | Q26288243 |
| Stakers | II | Spout Lane | | | 9 February 1978 | TL9006737360; 52°00′08″N 0°46′03″E | | 1036562 | Upload Photo | Q26288244 |
| The Harwell | II | Spout Lane | | | 9 February 1978 | TL8989037237; 52°00′04″N 0°45′54″E | | 1351791 | Upload Photo | Q26634861 |
| Village Hall | II | Spout Lane | | | 9 February 1978 | TL8959637205; 52°00′03″N 0°45′38″E | | 1036560 | Upload Photo | Q26288242 |
| Pond Farmhouse | II | Wyatts Lane | | | 9 February 1978 | TL8993337749; 52°00′20″N 0°45′57″E | | 1036563 | Upload Photo | Q26288245 |
| Tudor Cottage | II | Wyatts Lane | | | 9 February 1978 | TL8953537559; 52°00′15″N 0°45′36″E | | 1351792 | Upload Photo | Q26634862 |

== See also ==
- Grade I listed buildings in Suffolk
- Grade II* listed buildings in Suffolk

== Sources ==
- Bettely, James; Pevsner, Nikolaus (2015) [1961], Suffolk: West, The Buildings of England, New Haven and London: Yale University Press, ISBN 978-0-300-19655-9
