= Bedingfeld =

Bedingfeld, a variant of Bedingfield, is an English surname. Notable people with this surname include the following:

- Edmund Bedingfeld (1479–1553), English knight
- Frances Bedingfeld (1616–1704), Mother Superior of the English Institute of Mary
- Henry Bedingfeld (1509–1583), eldest son of Edmund Bedingfeld (1479–1553)

== See also ==
- Paston-Bedingfeld baronets of Oxburgh in the County of Norfolk, a title in the Baronetage of England
