= Carolyn Griffiths =

Railway engineer

Carolyn Griffiths OBE FREng FIMechE
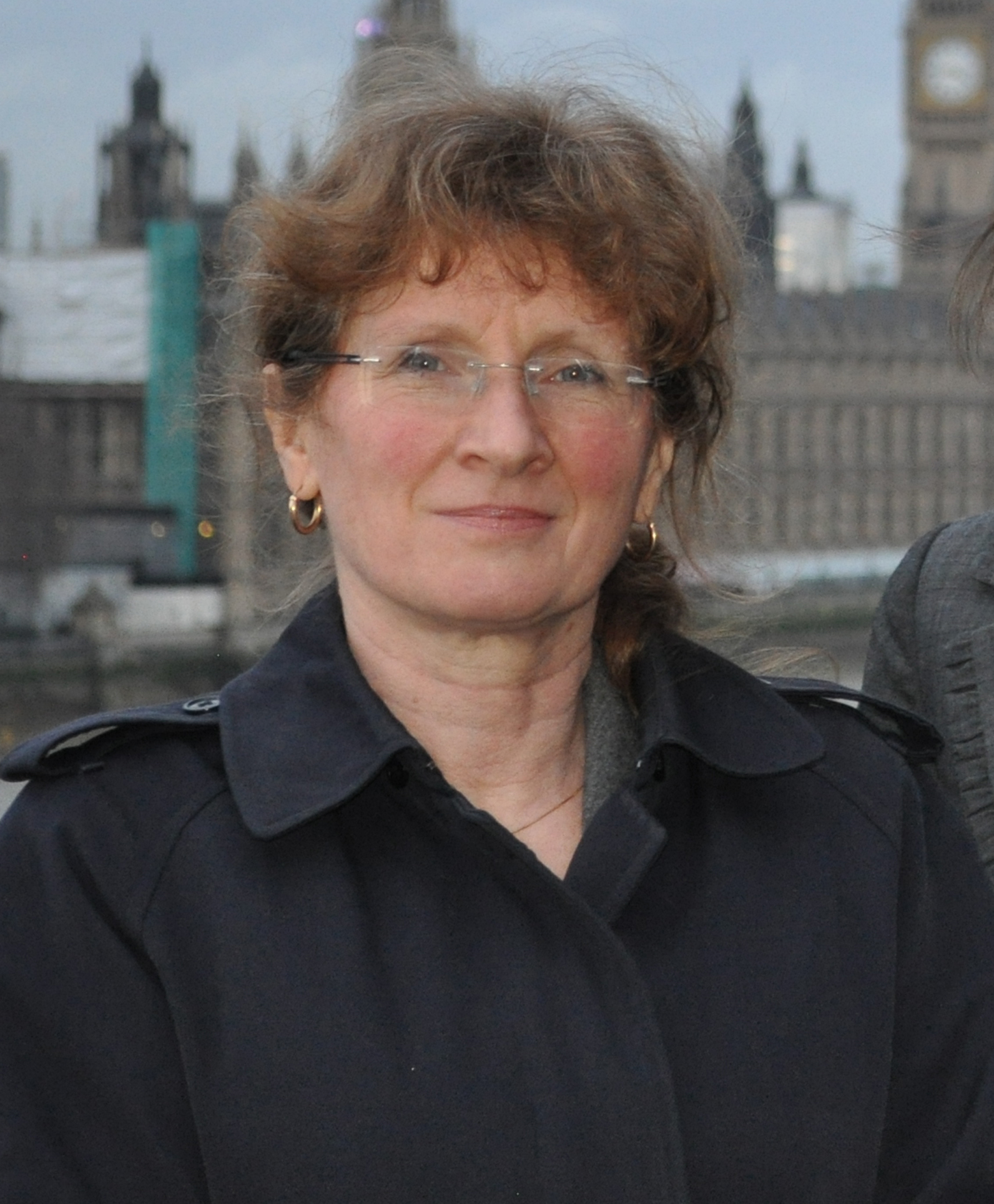

Chief Inspector of the UK Rail Accident Investigation Branch
- In office 7 October 2005 – 2015
- Preceded by: none

Personal details
- Education: British Rail: Trainee

Carolyn Jane Griffiths is a railway engineer. She founded and lead the UK's Rail Accident Investigation Branch, where she had the position of Chief Inspector, reporting directly to the Secretary of State for Transport. She was president of the Institution of Mechanical Engineers for 2017/18.

Griffiths joined the rail industry in 1979. She was elected a Fellow of the Royal Academy of Engineering (FREng) in 2013.

For her services to the rail industry she was awarded an honorary doctorate by Cranfield University in the same year.

Professional and academic associations
Preceded by Jon Hilton	President of the Institution of Mechanical Engineers; 2017–2018	Succeeded by Geoff Baker
