= Redlingfield =

Village in Suffolk, England

Coordinates: 52.294°N 1.206°E

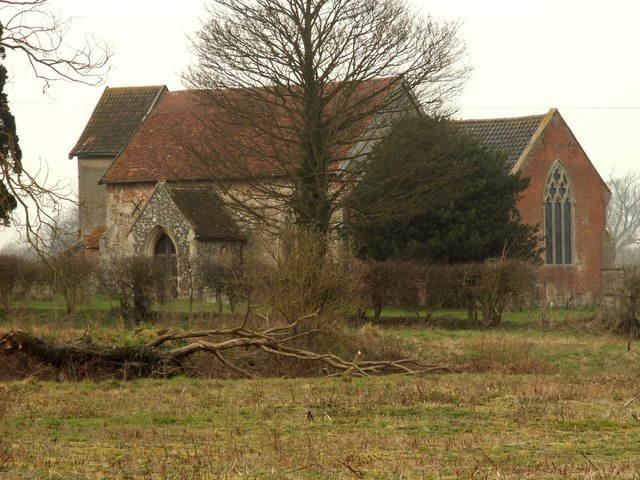
- St. Andrew's church, Redlingfield

- Location within Suffolk
- Population: 144
- District: Mid Suffolk
- Shire county: Suffolk
- Region: East
- Country: England
- Sovereign state: United Kingdom
- Post town: Eye
- Postcode district: IP23
- Police: Suffolk
- Fire: Suffolk
- Ambulance: East of England

Redlingfield is a village and civil parish in the Mid Suffolk district of Suffolk in eastern England. Located around six miles south-east of Diss, in 2011 its population (including Athelington) was 144, according to the 2011 census. Redlingfield Priory was found here from 1120 until it was disbanded during the Dissolution of the Monasteries, in which "the priory was surrendered on 10 February 1536-7".

== Population ==
From 1851 when it reached its peak population of 251, the parish maintained a relatively constant decline until 1961. Since then, the population has been slowly growing.

== St Andrew's Church ==
The church "serves a small and scattered parish of farms and cottage in the heart of the north Suffolk countryside." The church is Anglo Saxon in origin and is mentioned in the Domesday Book. As is the case with most ancient churches the building has been altered and restored several times. The 'earliest visible craftmanship' dates from the 14th century, the church also served the Redlingfield Priory from 1120 onward, before being returned to the village following the Reformation. One noteworthy feature is that the "church is built almost entirely of red brick, an uncommon and striking site for a church of the age, in this area."

== Employment ==
In 1831, two thirds of the population were described as 'labourers or servants' (with 'Middling Sorts' and Employers & Professionals' combined making up 15 people and 'other' describing 3), 33 of the labourers were 'Agricultural Labourers' with the remaining 3 in the category noted as servants. All of the employers were noted as being farmers. The Post Office Directory of 1865 stated 'The land is a rich loam, and is principally the property of Sir Robert Shafto Adair, who is lord of the manor, but there are a few other landed proprietors, namely, George Barber, Charles Clarke, Thomas Kerry...'

== Landscape ==
The area lies on a Boulder Clay Plateau, rising up to 56m above sea level. The area is relatively flat and is dominated by arable farming although it features one of suffolk's few collections of ancient woodland. The farmlands are divided by hedgerows heading for "stardom" due to their diverse array of species and 3 veteran Oaks believed to be boundary markers, indicating the great age of the hedgerow network.

== Second World War ==
The arrival of the 3,000 U.S. serviceman of 95th Bomb Group's B-17s at station 119 in neighbouring RAF Horham on 15 June 1943 swamped the corner of Suffolk. The airbase sprawled across four parishes including Redlingfield, and is unfortunately most notable for a B-17 Flying Fortress crashing upon take-off into Redlingfield, destroying a farmhouse and killing all ten crew.

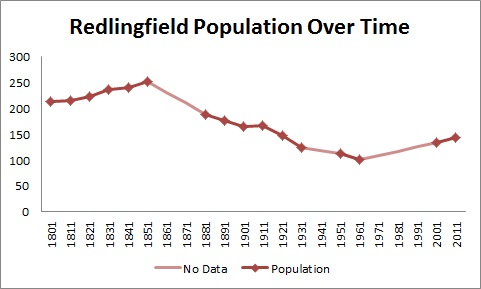
Population Time Graph

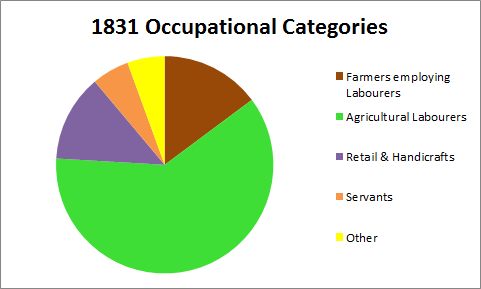
Divisions of Industry, Redlingfield 1831

== Notable residents ==
- Thomas Bedingfield (1592–1661), judge and politician who sat in the House of Commons twice as Member of Parliament for Dunwich between 1621 and 1626 then became Attorney-General of the Duchy of Lancaster.
