= Chris Huff =

American politician

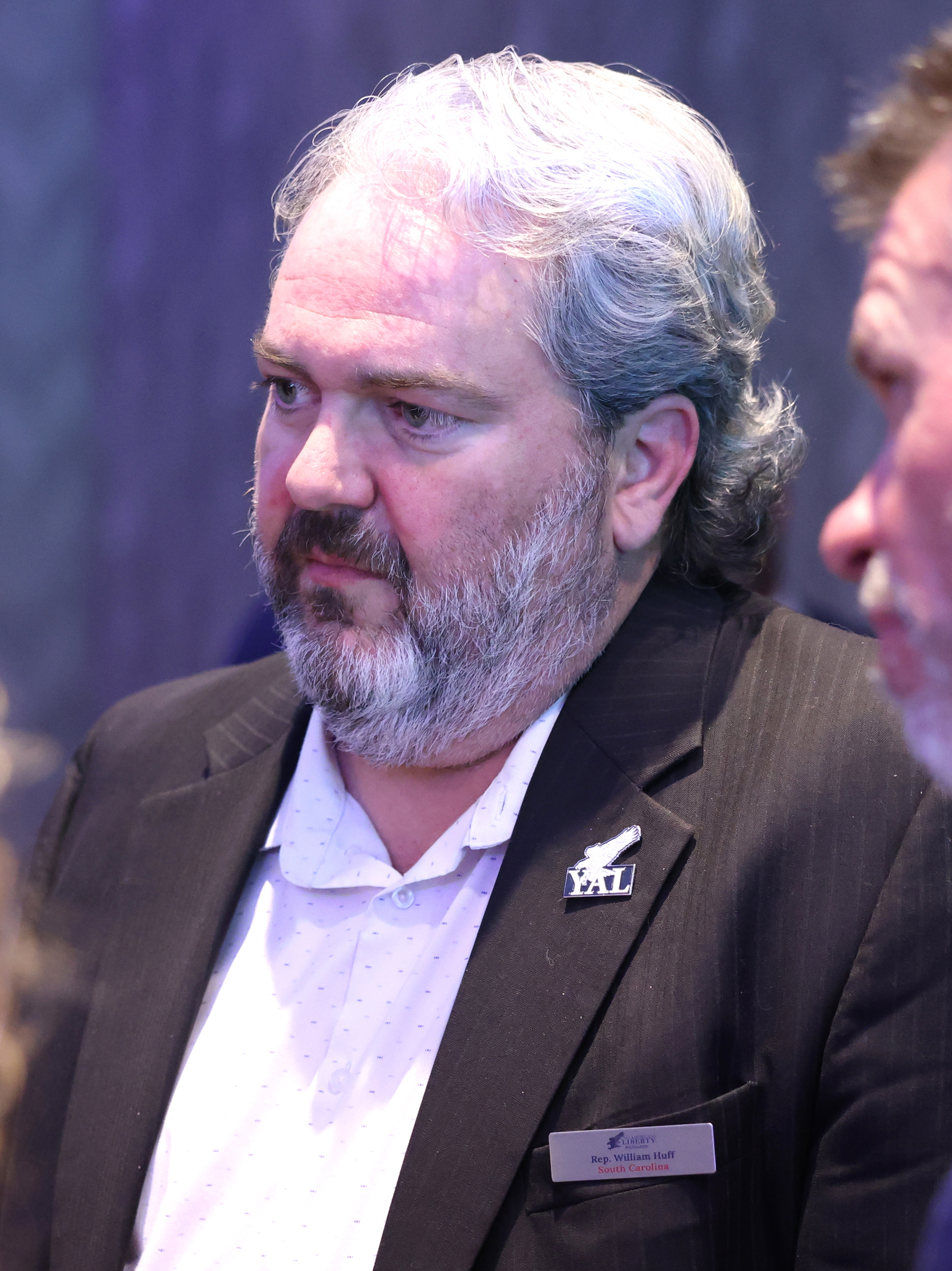

Member of the South Carolina House of Representatives from the 28th district
- Incumbent
- Assumed office November 11, 2024
- Preceded by: Ashley Trantham

Personal details
- Party: Republican

William C. "Chris" Huff is an American politician. He is a member of the South Carolina House of Representatives from the 28th District, serving since 2024. He is a member of the Republican Party.

== 2024 South Carolina House elections ==
When incumbent Ashley Trantham announced her decision not to run for re-election in 2024, five candidates filed for the Republican primary contest: Huff, Allen Kellett, Troy Prosser, Daniel Rumfelt and Kerri J. Smith. After a recount, a runoff was set between Huff and Smith. Huff emerged the Republican nominee, and was Trantham's preferred successor. He was supported by the South Carolina Freedom Caucus.

Huff defeated the Democratic nominee, Fritz Weibel, in the general election.

Huff serves on the House Education and Public Works Committee.

== Personal life ==
Huff is a retired pastor.
