= Henry Bedingfeld =

Member of the Parliament of England

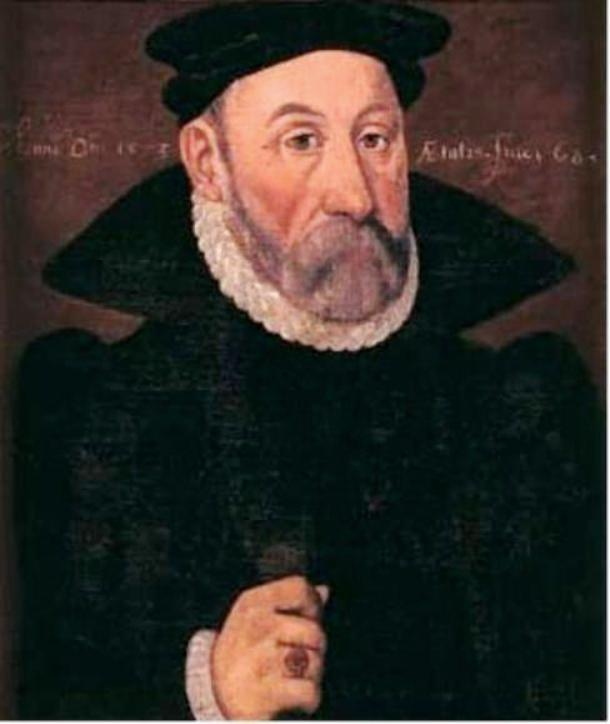
Bedingfeld (1505–1583), at the age of 68 in 1573

Sir Henry Bedingfeld (1505–1583), also spelled Bedingfield, of Oxburgh Hall, King's Lynn, Norfolk, was a Privy Councillor to King Edward VI and Queen Mary I, Lieutenant of the Tower of London, and (in 1557) Vice-Chamberlain of the Household and Captain of the guards. With Henry Jerningham he was among the principals who rallied to Mary's cause following the death of Edward VI in 1553 and helped to set her upon the throne. He was a senior figure in the kinship group of Catholic recusant landowning knights of Suffolk. Given responsibility for the custody of Mary I's half-sister Elizabeth when in the Tower of London and at Woodstock, his reputation has suffered from the repetition of claims of his severity towards her: however Queen Elizabeth was respectful towards him and continued to find service for him. Among the foremost Englishmen of his time, he occupied prominent and honourable positions and was of unquestioned loyalty.

== Family and education ==
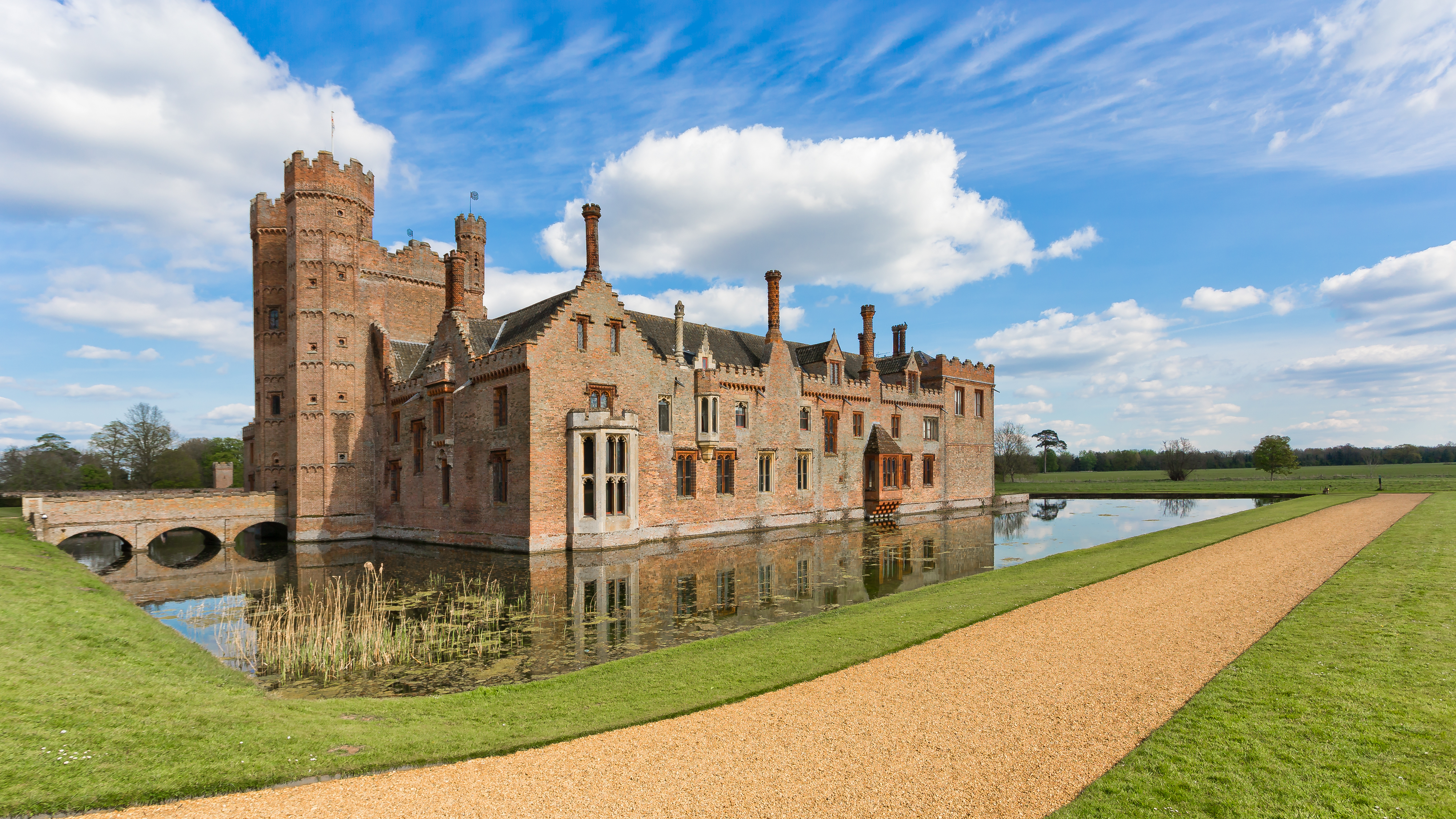
Oxburgh Hall, built by Sir Henry's grandfather

Bedingfeld was the eldest of five sons of Edmund Bedingfield (1479/80–1553) and his wife, Grace (died in or after 1553), the daughter of Henry Marney, 1st Baron Marney. His brothers were Francis, Anthony, Humphrey and Edmond, and his sisters were Elizabeth and Margaret. In February 1527/28, Bedingfeld was admitted to Lincoln's Inn. The Bedingfelds were closely connected to the ancient family of Beaupré, of Beaupré Hall, Outwell/Upwell, Norfolk.

During the 1530s Bedingfeld married Katherine (died 1581), the daughter of Roger Townshend of Raynham, Norfolk and his wife Amy Brewes, daughter and co-heiress of William de Brewse of Wenham Hall, Suffolk, and of Stinton Hall in Norfolk. In 1549 he was one of the many knights, esquires, and gentlemen who assisted the Marquess of Northampton in putting down Kett's Rebellion at Norwich, where, with Thomas Paston, John Clere, William Waldegrave and Thomas Cornwallis, he was appointed to the defence of part of the city. By that date, or certainly by 1551, he had received knighthood.

In 1553, the year of his father's death and the accession of Queen Mary, Bedingfield succeeded his father as heir to the Oxburgh estate and the Hall which had been built by his grandfather, the elder Edmund Bedingfield, (died 1496/97). It was to the March parliament of 1553, the second parliament of King Edward VI, that Bedingfeld was first elected, on that occasion as Knight of the Shire for Suffolk: from this it is supposed that he was then acquiescent in the regency of the Duke of Northumberland.

== Career ==
Bedingfeld held various offices, including Privy Councillor to King Edward VI and Queen Mary I, Constable and (in 1555) Lieutenant of the Tower of London, and (in 1557) Captain of the Guard and Vice-Chamberlain of the Household to Mary I.

After the death of King Edward VI in 1553, Bedingfeld and Henry Jerningham (together with William Drury, John Sulyard, John Shelton, Clement Higham and others) were two supporters very instrumental in placing Mary Tudor on the throne, coming to her aid at Kenninghall or Framlingham with 140 well-armed men. Bedingfeld proclaimed the queen at Norwich. He was afterward rewarded for his loyalty with an annual pension of 100 pounds out of the forfeited estates of Thomas Wyatt. Queen Mary appointed him a Privy Councillor and Knight Marshal of her army. It was in the light of this allegiance that he was elected to the first parliament of Mary's reign in October 1553 as one of the Knights of the Shire for Norfolk, and again in the succeeding parliament of 1554.

In March 1554, Mary (following Wyatt's rebellion) placed her half-sister Princess Elizabeth in the Tower of London. She was certainly aware that her mother Katherine of Aragon in later life had been kept at Kimbolton in the custody of Bedingfeld's father. She now entrusted Bedingfeld with the princess Elizabeth's custody, appointing him Constable of the Tower of London on 8 May, and instructing him to guard Elizabeth at Woodstock Palace, where he remained with her until April 1555.

John Foxe, in the Acts and Monuments, took every opportunity to blacken Bedingfield's character, and depicted him as severe and cruel towards his charge. Although, after her accession to the throne in 1558, Elizabeth used to address Bedingfeld at court as "Her Gaoler", most agree that the term was probably applied loosely and in good spirit. "That seems to have rather been a term of royal familiarity, than contempt; for had it been the latter, he would scarce have been so much at court as it appears he usually was," wrote Blomefield. The correspondence, published by C. R. Manning, suggests that Bedingfeld conducted himself in gentlemanly fashion towards the princess: J. M. Stone, noting that Elizabeth granted the manor of Caldecott to him, observed that John Strype, Bishop Burnet and Reginald Hennell had followed Foxe's account uncritically.

A mandate of Mary's to Bedingfeld survives in which she instructs him to deliver his orders to the bearer, John Sulyard, and to receive from him her orders as if from herself, and to carry them out unfailingly. Bedingfeld was appointed to the Lieutenancy of the Tower on 28 October 1555, after the resignation of Thomas Brydges. Among his prisoners were Peter Carew, Nicholas Arnold, William Courtenay and John Bray. Many unpleasant episodes passed in the Tower of London during Bedingfeld's governance of it, not least the tortures and executions arising from the Henry Dudley conspiracy in 1556, and the enforced recantation of John Cheke a few days after the death of Edward Lewknor. Yet several prisoners under his charge were permitted to have access to their wives or family members, and in such matters Bedingfeld appears to have been the obedient interpreter of Mary's direct commands, rather than the initiator of autocratic or vindictive practises.

Bedingfeld's friend and fellow Privy Councillor was Henry Jerningham: on 25 December 1557, as Edward Hastings became Lord Chamberlain of the Household and Thomas Cornwallis Comptroller, so Jerningham became Master of the Horse and Bedingfeld succeeded Jerningham as Vice-Chamberlain and became Captain of the Guard. Both maintained friendship with John Bourne, also a Privy Councillor and Secretary of State during the reign of Mary I. He was then re-elected for the third and last time as a Knight of the Shire for Norfolk in the parliament of 1558.

With the death of Queen Mary and the accession of Elizabeth in 1558, Bedingfeld withdrew from public office and retired to Norfolk, though maintaining connections in court. According to Foxe, Elizabeth is said to have discouraged his presence, saying "If we have any prisoner whom we would have sharply and straitly kept, we will send for you!". Bedingfeld remained a firm adherent to the Catholic faith, and in his last years was challenged for his recusancy. In December 1569 the justices of Suffolk delivered to the Privy Council various bonds of those who had refused to subscribe to a declaration of obedience to the Act of Uniformity 1558: these included a bond of Bedingfeld's, dated 1 December 1569, for good behaviour towards the Queen and for his appearance before the Privy Council. His lands were valued at £500 and his goods at £1000 at Oxburgh in the Norfolk diocesan returns of recusants of 1577. In her royal progress of 1578 Elizabeth received Bedingfeld's hospitality at Oxburgh, or intended to do so.

== Portraits ==
Bedingfeld's portrait was at Oxburgh Hall, where it was described in the following manner:

Body full, face turned very slightly towards the sinister, grey eyes full, long nose, light brown hair, round beard and moustache turning grey, soft black cap right down on the head." Dress: "Black doublet, high shoulders to it, and high black collar, very wide behind, small white frill all round the face; the right hand is forward clenched, probably holding gloves, frill round the wrist, a ring with an eagle displayed thereon, being on the third finger of the hand." S. Inscribed: "Anno D. 1573 ætatis suæ 68." "Sir Henry Bedingfeld Governor of the Tower.

An engraving is in the National Portrait Gallery. A miniature, oil on ivory, dated c. 1700–1799, is today at Oxburgh Hall, which now belongs to the National Trust.

== Death and monument ==
Katherine Bedingfeld was buried at Oxborough on 7 December 1581, and Bedingfeld on 24 August 1583. Bedingfeld's will, which gives a lively impression of the community at Oxburgh Hall, was dated 15 August 1583 and proved on 13 November following.

Their monument is to be found in the Bedingfield chapel at the parish church of St John, Oxborough. Shortly after the Second World War the tower of this church collapsed, destroying most of the nave. The chancel of the church, together with the Bedingfield chapel which was built onto the south side of it, was spared destruction and still remains.

== Children ==
The children of Sir Henry Bedingfeld and Katherine Townsend were:

- Edmund Bedingfield (died 1585) of Eriswell in Suffolk, who married (1) Anne, daughter of Sir Robert Southwell of Hoxne, Suffolk; and (2) Anne, daughter of John Moulton of Thurgarton, Norfolk.
- Thomas Bedingfeld, Gentleman pensioner to Queen Elizabeth, died 1613. Buried in St. James' Clerkenwell
- John Bedingfeld (died 1606+) of Redlingfield in Suffolk
- Nicholas Bedingfeld, of Swatshall in Gislingham, died without issue in 1636
- Henry Bedingfeld of Sturston
- Alice Bedingfeld, married (1) Thomas Carvell, eldest son of Humphrey Kerville of Wiggenhall St Mary Magdalen, Norfolk; and (2) Henry Seckford, Gentleman of the Privy Chamber to Queen Elizabeth
- Amy Bedingfeld, the wife of Thomas Wilbraham, Attorney of the Court of Wards
- Eva Bedingfeld (died 1631), the wife of William Yaxley of Yaxley, Suffolk
- Katherine Bedingfeld
- Elizabeth Bedingfeld, married Edmund Richers of Swannington, Norfolk
- Anne Bedingfeld

== Sources ==
- Archer, Thomas Andrew (1885). "Bedingfield, Henry (1509?-1583)" . Dictionary of National Biography. Vol. 04. pp. 113–114.
- William Joseph Sheils, ‘Bedingfield family (per. 1476-1760)’, Oxford Dictionary of National Biography, Oxford University Press, 2004 [accessed 5 June 2005: http://www.oxforddnb.com/view/article/76392]
- J. M., Stone Studies From Court and Cloister, Essays Historical and Literary, pb. 1908 London and Edinburgh sands and company St Louis, MO.
- Ann Weikel, ‘Bedingfeld, Sir Henry (1509x11-1583)’, Oxford Dictionary of National Biography, Oxford University Press, 2004

Political offices
Preceded by Sir Henry Jerningham	Vice-Chamberlain of the Household; 1557–1558	Succeeded by Sir Edward Rogers
