= Cornard Mere =

Nature reserve in Suffolk, England

Coordinates: 52.016°N 0.75°E

- Site of Special Scientific Interest
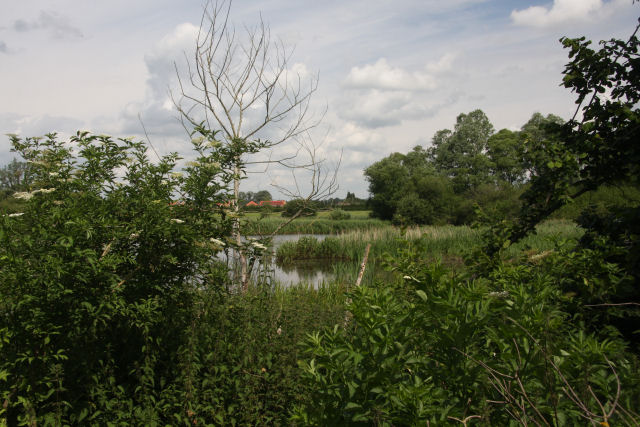
- Location of Cornard Mere.
- Area of search: Suffolk
- Grid reference: TL 888 389
- Interest: Biological
- Area: 8.5 hectares
- Notification date: 1986
- Location map: Magic Map

Cornard Mere is an 8.5-hectare (21-acre) biological Site of Special Scientific Interest in Little Cornard in Suffolk. It is managed by the Suffolk Wildlife Trust.

This site has diverse habitats, with fen which is seasonally flooded, ruderal herb vegetation, woodland, grassland and scrub. Flora include water mint, gypsywort, skullcap, ragged robin and southern marsh orchid.

There is access from Bures Road.
