= Ashley Trantham =

American politician

Member of the South Carolina House of Representatives from the 28th district
- In office 2018–2024
- Preceded by: Eric Bedingfield
- Succeeded by: Chris Huff

Personal details
- Born: November 30, 1973 (age 52) Greer, South Carolina, U.S.
- Party: Republican
- Education: Spartanburg Community College

Ashley B. Trantham (born November 30, 1973) is an American politician. She is a former member of the South Carolina House of Representatives from the 28th District, serving from 2018 to 2024. She is a member of the Republican Party.

Trantham was a member of the South Carolina Freedom Caucus. She also served on the House Agriculture, Natural Resources & Environmental Affairs Committee.

== 2024 SC House elections ==
Trantham opted not to run for re-election in 2024. She is succeeded by Chris Huff.
