= Symphony No. 40 (Haydn) =

Symphony in four movements by Joseph Haydn

Joseph Haydn

The Symphony No. 40 in F major, Hoboken I/40, is a symphony by Joseph Haydn. Despite its number, Haydn had composed this symphony by 1763, long before the other symphonies numbered in the 30s and 40s in Hoboken's catalog. Chronologically, the symphony belongs with Symphony No. 13 and has stylistic similarities with Haydn's earliest symphonic output.

== Music ==
The symphony is scored for two oboes, bassoon, two French horns, and strings.

The work is in four movements:

1. Allegro, 3/4
2. Andante più tosto Allegretto in B♭ major, 2/4
3. Menuet e Trio, 3/4
4. Allegro, 2/2

Douglas Townsend found the development section of the first movement to be particularly interesting, as he found the string writing to foreshadow Haydn's later symphonies, and he considered the movement "restless" which looks forward to Haydn's Sturm und Drang era.

The second movement is written in divertimento style, and Townsend considered it pleasant but lacking intellectual substance.

The third movement contains melodic and rhythmic variety lacking in the previous movement.

The last movement is a fugue, as with the contemporary Symphony No. 13 and the later Symphony No. 70. The fugue is on two subjects.
