= Symphony No. 13 (Haydn) =

Symphony in four movements by Joseph Haydn

Joseph Haydn

Joseph Haydn's Symphony No. 13 in D major was written in 1763 for the orchestra of Haydn's patron, Prince Nikolaus Esterházy, in Eisenstadt. The symphony can be precisely dated thanks to a dated score in Haydn's own hand in the National Library of Budapest. Two other Haydn symphonies are known to have been written in the same year: Symphony No. 12 and Symphony No. 40.

A typical performance of the symphony lasts a little over 20 minutes.

== Music ==
A typical symphony at this time was written for a pair of oboes and horns and strings, but the Eisenstadt orchestra had recently taken on two new horn players, and Haydn wrote this symphony for an expanded ensemble of one flute, two oboes, four horns, timpani and strings (violins divided into firsts and seconds, violas, cellos and double basses), with bassoon doubling the bass-line. The timpani part in the autograph score is not in Haydn's hand, but it is quite possibly authentic: he may have written it on a separate sheet, with somebody else adding it to the score at a later date.

The work has four movements:

1. Allegro molto, 4/4
2. Adagio cantabile in G major, 4/4
3. Menuet & Trio (Trio in G major), 3/4
4. Finale. Allegro molto, 2/4

The first movement opens with held chords in the winds and the strings playing a simple figure based on an arpeggio:

The movement can be considered to be in sonata form, with a repeated first half beginning in the home key of D major and modulating to A major, then a second half beginning with a development of previously heard material (passing through B minor) followed by a recapitulation of the first half, now entirely in D major (this second half also repeated). However, there is little "second subject" to speak of – following the key change in the first half, the music is mainly based on simple scale passages.

The second movement, marked adagio cantabile (slowly, singing), in G major, features a solo cello playing a melody against simple chords from the rest of the strings. The winds do not play in this movement. In Haydn's day, the cello part would have been played by the principal cellist of the Eistenstadt orchestra, Joseph Franz Weigl.

The D major third movement is a minuet and trio in ternary form, with the flute prominently featured in the trio. The last movement is based around a four-note figure which sounds like the last movement of Mozart's Jupiter Symphony:

The figure, which appears in various keys throughout the movement, is treated in a manner which hints at fugue. Near the end it is heard in the strings in stretto (overlapping entries, a new one beginning before the last has ended).
