= Eric Bedingfield =

American politician

Member of the South Carolina House of Representatives from the 28th district
- In office 2007–2018
- Preceded by: Dan Tripp
- Succeeded by: Ashley Trantham

Personal details
- Born: January 30, 1967 (age 59) Greenville, South Carolina, United States
- Party: Republican
- Profession: Consultant, businessman

Eric Bedingfield (born January 30, 1967) is an American consultant, businessman and former politician. He was a Republican member of the South Carolina House of Representatives from the 28th District, serving from 2007 to 2018.

Bedingfield was born in Greenville, South Carolina to Burgess Michael Bedingfield and Fielding Petty Carmouche. He graduated from Carolina High School in 1985 and was a member of the United States Marine Corps Reserve between 1985 and 1993. He graduated from Greenville Technical College, with an associate degree in 1988. Between 2004 and 2006, he served as the chairman of the Greenville County Public Service Planning and Development Commission.

In 2006, Bedingfield ran unopposed in the Republican primary for the 28th district of the South Carolina House of Representatives, replacing outgoing state representative Dan Tripp. In the November 7 general election, he won against Democratic candidate Jonathan David Smith by a 61%–39% margin, become the new state representative. He continued to win elections and serve as representative in 2008, 2010, 2012, 2014 and 2016.

Bedingfield announced his resignation on August 29, 2017, when he announced he was starting a new position as the director of governmental affairs at Greenville Technical College. His resignation was effective January 18, 2018.

He married Kimberly Kay Bedingfield in 2020 and has 4 children, 1 stepson, and 2 grandchildren.
