= Little Cornard derailment =

2010 train collision with lorry in Suffolk, England

Details
- Date: 17 August 2010; 17:33
- Location: Little Cornard, Suffolk
- Coordinates: TL 885 390; 52°01′4.18″N 0°44′46.91″E
- Country: England
- Line: Gainsborough Line
- Operator: National Express East Anglia
- Cause: Line obstructed by road vehicle

Statistics
- Trains: 1
- Passengers: 25 approx
- Injured: 23 (five serious)

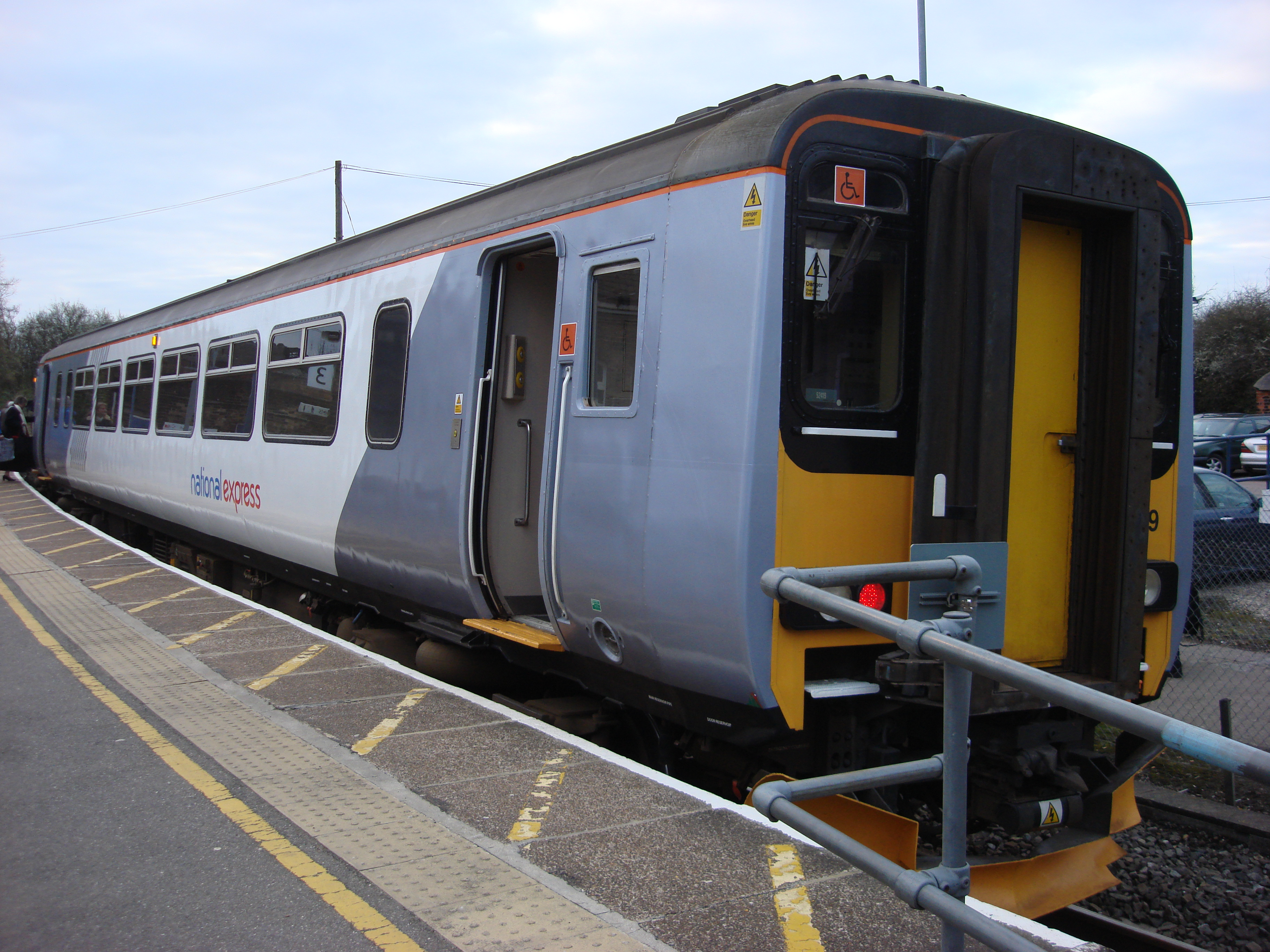
A Class 156 diesel multiple unit, similar to the one involved in the collision, pictured at Marks Tey in 2008

The Little Cornard derailment occurred on 17 August 2010 when a passenger train collided with a road vehicle on a level crossing on the Gainsborough Line near Little Cornard, Suffolk, and partly derailed. The vehicle, a tanker lorry, had begun crossing over the track when the Class 156 train from Sudbury destined for Marks Tey struck it whilst travelling at a speed of approximately 40 miles per hour (64 km/h).

Twenty-three people aboard the train were injured, five of them seriously, including the driver. The lorry driver was subsequently jailed and disqualified from driving for causing the accident, after he admitted to having not used the crossing telephone to obtain permission from the signaller to cross the railway.

== Accident ==
At 17:33 BST on 17 August 2010, Class 156 'Super Sprinter' diesel multiple unit number 156417 was in collision with a tanker lorry that was on a level crossing on the Gainsborough Line, approximately halfway between Sudbury and Bures stations. The lorry was proceeding from sewage works adjacent to the line towards Bures Road. The train, 2T27, was operating the 17:31 National Express East Anglia service from Sudbury to Marks Tey, an hourly service on the single-track route.

At the time of the crash, the train was travelling at approximately 40 miles per hour (64 km/h); the driver had applied the train's emergency brake a few seconds beforehand having realised the lorry was not going to stop before entering the crossing, and thus had been able to slow the train from a speed of 50 miles per hour (80 km/h). The first carriage of the two-car train derailed as a result of the collision, and the lorry was overturned. Although the train driver had been able to warn passengers in the front carriage to brace for an imminent impact, he, the conductor and 21 passengers were injured. The injuries to the driver and four of the passengers were serious, and two others stayed overnight in hospital.

The Essex Air Ambulance was among the emergency services that attended the scene. This aircraft was used to transfer one patient to Colchester Hospital and another to Addenbrooke's Hospital in Cambridge. The driver suffered a broken back and one passenger sustained injuries that were described as "life-threatening". Six other victims of the accident were kept overnight in Colchester General Hospital and a seventh stayed overnight at West Suffolk Hospital in Bury St. Edmunds.

=== Location ===
The Gainsborough Line is 11 miles 67 chains (19.1 km) in length and links Marks Tey on the Great Eastern Main Line in Essex to Sudbury in Suffolk. The gated level crossing is on a private road leading to sewage works owned by Anglian Water, near the village of Little Cornard between Sudbury and Bures. Sudbury station is 58 miles 36 chains (94.1 km) measured from Liverpool Street in London; the crossing is at 56 miles 62 chains (91.4 km), and Bures station is at 53 miles 45 chains (86.2 km).

The level crossing is classified as a user-worked crossing (UWC) and hence a telephone is provided to enable users to obtain permission from the signaller to cross the line. Network Rail stated that no telephone call was received from the lorry driver before the collision occurred, a fact corroborated by the Rail Accident Investigation Branch in its report.

== Aftermath ==
The line was closed until 21:50 on 19 August 2010. Aside from the damage to rolling stock and track, a culvert collapsed. British Transport Police arrested the lorry driver, who was questioned in connection with several alleged offences and later charged with endangering the safety of the railway. The wreckage of the lorry was removed from the line in the early hours of 18 August, but a 130-tonne crane had to be brought in to remove the derailed train, which was eventually removed at 04:30 on 19 August and taken by road to Milton Keynes for repairs.

The lorry driver appeared before magistrates at Bury St. Edmunds on 20 August and was remanded on conditional bail to appear again on 1 October. On 29 October, at Ipswich Crown Court, he pleaded guilty to endangering the safety of the railway and was granted conditional bail. On 26 November, he was sentenced to 15 months in prison and disqualified from driving for three years.

== Reactions ==
Bob Crow, general secretary of the National Union of Rail, Maritime and Transport Workers, said the accident was "avoidable" and called for a programme to eliminate all level crossings from the British railway network. Keith Norman, general secretary of the Associated Society of Locomotive Engineers and Firemen said that he was saddened that lessons had not been learned from previous accidents, and criticised Network Rail for failing to modernise many level crossings.

== Investigation ==
British Transport Police opened an investigation into the events before the accident, which centred on whether or not Anglian Water gave proper training to visitors to the sewage works in relation to the correct use of the level crossing. The Rail Accident Investigation Branch (RAIB) opened an investigation into the accident itself.

The RAIB's investigation report was published in August 2011. It concluded that the primary cause of the accident was that the lorry driver drove onto the crossing when it was unsafe to do so. Although he was aware that he should contact the signaller by telephone before and after crossing, he did not call before starting to cross. A lack of track circuits on the line meant that sometimes users of the level crossing faced a wait of up to 19 minutes before being given permission to cross. On one occasion, a wait of 36 minutes was recorded. Although drivers were required to obtain permission to cross, this was only done about 30% of the time.

Network Rail had failed to involve Anglian Water and other authorised users of the crossing in the triennial risk assessment of the crossing. This was deemed to be an underlying cause of the accident. The design of the tables used in Class 156 trains was deemed to have contributed to a number of serious injuries, although the train itself was deemed to have met its design specification in respect of the collision. The signage at the crossing was deemed to give unclear information and thus a contributory factor. As a result of the accident, telephones at the crossing were moved so that a driver did not need to open the gates to access the telephones. Miniature stop lights were to be introduced, and track circuits may also be introduced on the line. Anglian Water ceased using outside contractors to remove sludge from the sewage works. Six recommendations were made in the report.
