= Bilecik train collision =

2010 train collision in Bilecik, Turkey

Details
- Date: 3 January 2010
- Location: Bilecik
- Coordinates: 40.1431°N 29.9792°E
- Country: Turkey
- Line: Istanbul - Eskişehir
- Operator: Turkish State Railways
- Incident type: Rear-end collision
- Cause: Signal passed at danger

Statistics
- Trains: 2
- Deaths: 1
- Injured: 7

The Bilecik train collision happened on 3 January 2010, when two passenger trains collided in Bilecik, Turkey. One person was killed and seven people were injured.

Two passenger trains were involved in a collision at Bilecik, Turkey when one train ran into the rear of another. One train driver was killed and seven passengers were injured. Both trains were travelling from Istanbul to Eskişehir. The second train passed a signal at danger and ran into the rear of the first train, which was stationary at the time.

== See also ==
- List of rail accidents (2010-2019)
