= Suffolk Fire and Rescue Service =

Fire and rescue service in Suffolk, England

Operational area
- Country: England
- County: Suffolk
- Address: Suffolk Fire & Rescue Service, Endeavour House, Russell Road, Ipswich, IP1 2BX

Agency overview
- Established: 1948
- Annual calls: 5,212 Incidents
- Employees: 206 wholetime firefighters; 401 on-call firefighters; 109 support staff
- Annual budget: £21.6 million
- Chief Fire Officer: Jon Lacey

Facilities and equipment
- Divisions: 3
- Stations: 35
- Engines: 43
- Aerial Ladder Platforms: 2

Website
- www.suffolk.gov.uk/suffolk-fire-and-rescue-service/

Suffolk Fire and Rescue Service (SFRS) is the statutory fire and rescue service covering the county of Suffolk in East Anglia, England. It was formed in 1948 as the Suffolk & Ipswich Fire Service, before changing after the 1974 Local Government Review to 'Suffolk Fire Service'. Following the 2004 Fire & Rescue Services Act, the service name was changed to Suffolk Fire & Rescue Service to better reflect its role. Suffolk has a population of 760,556 and covers 1,466 square miles (3,800 km^{2}). The county town is Ipswich with other major towns including Lowestoft, Bury St-Edmunds, Felixstowe and Newmarket.

== Headquarters and Control Room ==
The headquarters of Suffolk Fire and Rescue Service is located within Endeavour House, Russell Road, Ipswich. This is also the location of Suffolk County Council's Ipswich based offices and meeting space. The Combined Fire Control Room is shared between Suffolk Fire & Rescue Service and Cambridgeshire Fire & Rescue Service and is situated at Hinchingbrooke Cottage, Brampton Road, Huntingdon (Cambridgeshire). It is responsible for handling all 999 emergency calls received across Suffolk and Cambridgeshire and mobilising resources to incidents. The Control Room has 5 watches, Blue, Green, White, Red and Day which are headed by the Control Group Commander.

== Performance ==
Every fire and rescue service in England and Wales is periodically subjected to a statutory inspection by His Majesty's Inspectorate of Constabulary and Fire & Rescue Services (HMICFRS). The inspections investigate how well the service performs in each of three areas. On a scale of outstanding, good, requires improvement and inadequate, Suffolk Fire and Rescue Service was rated as follows:

HMICFRS Inspection Suffolk
| Area | Rating 2018/19 | Rating 2021/22 | Description |
|---|---|---|---|
| Effectiveness | Good | Good | How effective is the fire and rescue service at keeping people safe and secure from fire and other risks? |
| Efficiency | Good | Requires improvement | How efficient is the fire and rescue service at keeping people safe and secure from fire and other risks? |
| People | Good | Good | How well does the fire and rescue service look after its people? |

== Incidents ==
In the year to October 2020, SFRS attended 5,212 incidents, where 2,409 were false alarms, 814 were primary fires, 860 were secondary fires, 304 were road traffic collisions (RTC) and 825 were special service. Across these incidents, there were six reported fatalities, with 179 casualties. This is compared to 243 fatalities and 6,910 casualties for the whole of England in the same period. The average response time for the first fire engine to arrive on scene was 10 minutes and 4 seconds. The service has noted a significant reduction in demand for its 999 services over the last 10 years. The summer heatwave in 2018, which affected much of England, led to a significant increase in the number and size of crop and other fires in the countryside. Forecasts of climate changes will increase the frequency of this type of event.

== Appliances and capabilities ==
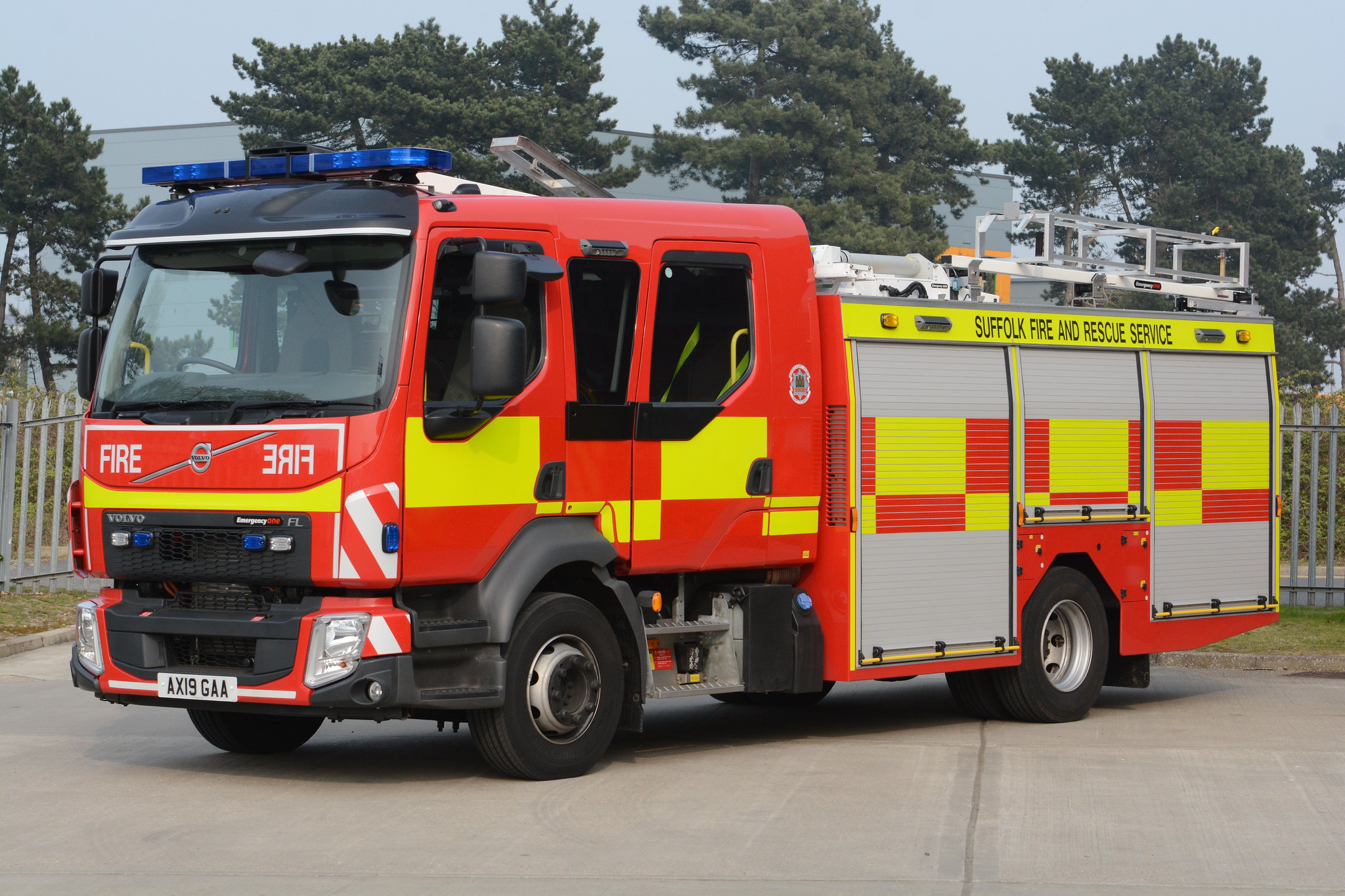
Standard Suffolk Fire Appliance

=== Vehicles ===
- 43 Fire Engines: the standard firefighting vehicle mobilised to all emergency calls. These appliances are equipped with a high-pressure two-stage main pump also capable of making foam via an onboard foam inductor system, two high-pressure hose reels, a range of 45 & 70 mm hose reels, a set of rescue ladders (13.5 m, 9 m, Short Extension Ladder, Roof Ladder), a light portable fire pump, four / six breathing apparatus sets (depending on age), two spare breathing air cylinders, hydraulic rescue equipment, basic water rescue kit, safe working at height equipment and other miscellaneous tools.
- 2 Aerial Appliances: there are two aerial appliances for rescues and work at heights of up to 30 metres (98 ft). There are two in use with the service, the Aerial Ladder Platform (ALP) and the Combined Aerial Rescue Pump (CARP), which also doubles up as a normal fire engine.
- 3 Enhanced Rescue Tenders (ERT): Very similar to the rescue pump, however more emphasis on rescue operations and incidents.
- 3 Unimog 4x4's: They can carry two pods, one is a firefighting pod (including bulk foam) and the other is a water rescue pod. They can tow the flood boats (RHIB) and have cranes so they can undertake animal rescues. The Unimog's can also be used with no pod in order to facilitate the transport of vital equipment when assisting with bigger incidents.

== Fire stations ==
The service has 35 fire stations, where 14 are jointly shared between either police and/or ambulance. The stations are divided into three districts, North Suffolk, South Suffolk and West Suffolk, each supervised by a District Manager. These stations include:

- Four wholetime shift stations
- 29 on-call stations
- Two wholetime day-crewed stations

The stations are crewed by mixture of wholetime (works full time at a fire station to respond immediately), day-crewed (works full time at a fire station only during the day) and on-call/retained (where they live locally and travel to their fire station when their alerter/pager goes off). Some stations are also cross-crewed by a mixture of firefighters from other stations, wholetime and on-call.

== Notable incidents ==
- 2010 Little Cornard derailment – 21 people injured after train derails on level crossing after a collision with a tanker
- 2010 Lowestoft – over 100 firefighters in attendance at a meat processing factory fire
- 2011 Ipswich – Psychiatric hospital fire. Patient nearly died after the fire alarm was ignored eight times
- 2012 Hadleigh – ten crews attend fuel tankers on fire
- 2013 Ipswich, Felixstowe, Southwold, Lowestoft – Numerous crews responded to reports of flooding throughout the night and into the following days during the worst tidal surge to hit the east coast in recent memory.
- 2015 Sudbury – 100 firefighters attend Nail bar fire.
- 2018 Suffolk – During the Summer of 2018, over 50 wildfires broke out in Suffolk due to the 2018 heatwave, with notable fires causing nine crews for two separate bush fires at Rushmere Heath near Ipswich, seven crews for a field of crops alight near Newmarket and six crews to a bush fire at a nature reserve in Lowestoft.
- 2019 Lowestoft – ten fire crews attended a chemical link at a food manufacturing site in Lowestoft. No one was injured as the leak was able to be isolated.
- 2021 Bury St Edmunds - 15 fire crews and British Sugar firefighters respond to a fire at a British Sugar Factory fire near Bury St Edmunds. There were no casualties.

== See also ==
- List of British firefighters killed in the line of duty

== Sources ==
- Firefighting in Suffolk, Saward G., Lavenham Press, 1998
