= Margery Beddingfield =

British murderer (1742–1763)

Ann Beddingfield
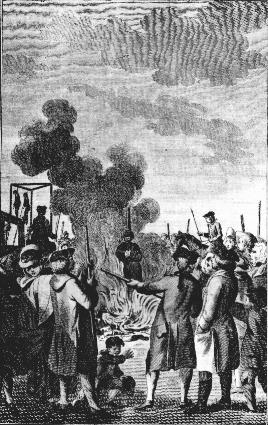
- 18th-century illustration of Beddingfield being burned to death
- Born: 1742; England
- Died: 8 April 1763 (aged 20–21); Rushmere, England
- Cause of death: Death by burning
- Spouse: John Beddingfield
- Criminal charges: Petty treason
- Accomplice: Richard Ringe

Margery Beddingfield (also known as Margaret, Ann, Annne or Anne Margaret) (1742–1763) was a British woman convicted and burned at the stake for murder in 1763.

== Biography ==
Daughter to farmer John Rowe and his wife, Margery was named after her mother and baptized on 29 June 1742 in the Blaxhall church, Suffolk. When she was scarcely 17, Margery married John Beddingfield, a wealthy farmer from Sternfield, on 3 July 1759. They lived on an estate in Suffolk in a large manor house and had two children. They had one daughter Pleasance and one son John; the latter died when he was four months old.

Elizabeth Riches and the boys William Masterson and John Nunn also lived with them.

== Affair and murder plot ==
Around Michaelmas (29 September) of 1761, the Beddingfields hired two servants, the nursemaid Elizabeth Cleobold and the farmhand Richard Ringe. Ann took a liking to the handsome, 19-year-old Ringe, who was flattered by the attention. While Beddingfield and her husband were not on ill terms, she treated him less than kindly and they displeased each other often.

She made her affection known to Ringe and he apparently did not have "the virtue to resist the temptation" as the two began an affair that would last for the next three months. They were not very discreet and four of the household's servants later remarked upon their doings. Eventually, Ann came to propose to Ringe the murder of her husband. Margery promised to marry Ringe as soon as he "destroyed her husband". He hesitated initially, but was persuaded once she promised to give him half of the estate. Ann seemed to hint at the plot when she commanded her maidservant to:

"Help me to put on my ear-rings; but I shall not wear them much longer, for I shall have new black ones. It will not be long before somebody in the house dies, and I believe it will be your master."

Ringe obtained arsenic from a local chemist and attempted to convince the servant Elizabeth Riches to add the poison to Mr Beddingfield's morning helping of rum and milk, saying he would be her "constant friend". She refused and Ringe later tried to poison Beddingfield himself when he was asked to get water to cool off the hot water that Beddingfield had been given to treat his vomiting. Beddingfield noticed a white sediment in the water and refused to drink it but did not suspect foul play.

== Strangulation of John Beddingfield ==
One night in March 1763, Ringe pretended to sleep while Beddingfield entertained a business associate he had invited over for punch. After Beddingfield went to bed, Ringe sneaked into his room. He lingered there for about 15 minutes before attacking the sleeping man, strangling him with a cord. They struggled and both fell off of the bed. In the commotion they knocked down and bent the bed rod. Ringe then went to the adjacent room where Ann had been sleeping and announced "I have done for him" to which Ann replied, "Then I am easy." He did not realise that the maidservant Cleobold was sharing her bed (for warmth). John Beddingfield's death was revealed to the household and the coroner was called for. None of the servants informed the coroner of their suspicions. Following a superficial enquiry, the coroner pronounced the death as being the result natural causes, those being him strangling himself in his bed sheets.

Cleobold waited until she received her quarterly wages to report the murder, during the Ipswich Lent assizes.

== Inquest and trial ==
The coroner's inquest of Beddingfield's body showed signs of willful murder. He was buried on 30 July. Both Ringe and Margery were tried at Lent Assizes (April 1763) before Baron of the Court of Exchequer Richard Adams. Ringe confessed to his crime and added that Margery's previous affection for him had turned to hatred. She too eventually gave her confession. Since Beddingfield was Ringe's master and Margery's husband, both of them were convicted of petty treason.

While Ringe was sentenced to hang to death, Beddingfield was sentenced to burn at the stake, a punishment reserved for murderous, unfaithful wives. Both had insisted upon their innocence until a few days before the execution when Ringe confessed.

== Execution ==
Beddingfield was executed on a Friday, 8 April 1763, in Rushmere, Ipswich, alongside Ringe. Prior to his hanging, Ringe addressed the crowd that had assembled, confessing and giving a lecture on "the snares and pitfalls of wicked women." Meanwhile, Beddingfield was burned at the stake and was probably strangled with a rope as the fire was lit. There was a huge gathering of onlookers.

An account of the events was included in The Newgate Calendar, a collection of moralising stories about 18th- and 19th-century English criminals, and bore an illustration of Beddingfield being burned to death. According to the author, in the case "females will find another warning against the shocking consequences which ever attend illicit love". Though Ringe committed the murder of Beddingfield, Newgate describes Ann as the murderer and Ringe as her "accomplice".

== Bibliography ==
- Durston, Gregory J. (2014). Wicked Ladies: Provincial Women, Crime and the Eighteenth-Century English Justice System. Cambridge Scholars Publishing. ISBN 978-1-4438-6599-9.
- Durston, Gregory J (2016). Fields, Fens and Felonies: Crime and Justice in Eighteenth-Century East Anglia. Waterside Press. ISBN 978-1-909976-11-5.
