= Little Cornard =

Village in Suffolk, England

Coordinates: 52.018°N 0.769°E

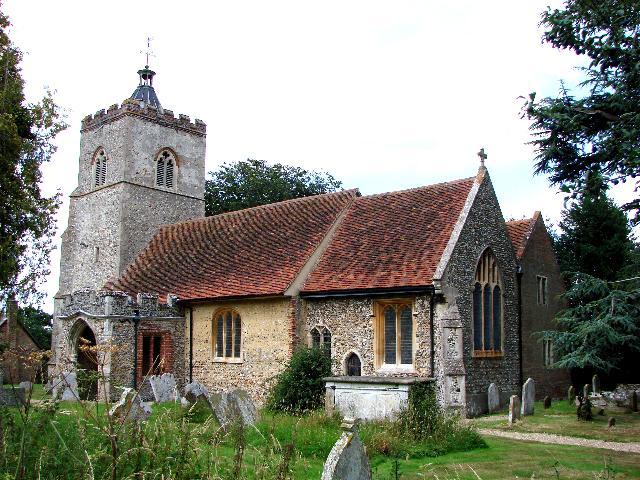
- All Saints Church

- Location within Suffolk
- Population: 286 (2011)
- Civil parish: Little Cornard
- District: Babergh
- Shire county: Suffolk
- Region: East
- Country: England
- Sovereign state: United Kingdom
- Post town: SUDBURY
- Postcode district: CO10
- Dialling code: 01787
- Police: Suffolk
- Fire: Suffolk
- Ambulance: East of England

Little Cornard is a village and civil parish in Suffolk, England. Located around 0.5 miles (0.8 km) from its larger sibling, Great Cornard, on the B1508 road between Sudbury and Colchester, it is part of Babergh district, and has a population of 305, reducing to 286 at the 2011 Census. The parish also includes the hamlet of Workhouse Green.

The parish's eastern boundary is the River Stour (also Suffolk's border with Essex). The parish is also home to the Cornard Mere Site of Special Scientific Interest, and the Appletree Wood and Mumford Wood wildlife sites.

== Church ==
All Saints Church is a small flint and brick church of the C14 and Cl5. Standing isolated in fields, it is a Grade I listed building. There are six bells hanging in the tower, the oldest two were cast in 1399 and 1597, three were cast around the 1700s, and the sixth bell was newly cast during a restoration process in 2018.

== Hymn tune ==
The village also gives its name to a hymn tune by Martin Shaw, used for singing Charles E. Oakley's hymn Hills of the North, Rejoice and for Lord of our Growing Years by David Mowbray.

== Train accident ==
On 17 August 2010, several people were injured, four seriously, when a train collided with a sewage truck in the village. The two-carriage passenger train collided with the truck at around 17:35 BST.

== Dragon legend ==
There is a legend that on 26 September 1449 a fight between two dragons took place on a meadow by the River Stour. One dragon was black and came from Kedington Hill, Suffolk, the other was red and came from Ballingdon Hill, Essex. After an hour's fighting the red dragon won, and both went back to their hills. The site of the mythical battle is known locally as Sharpfight Meadow.
