= Gary Bedingfield =

British historian of baseball

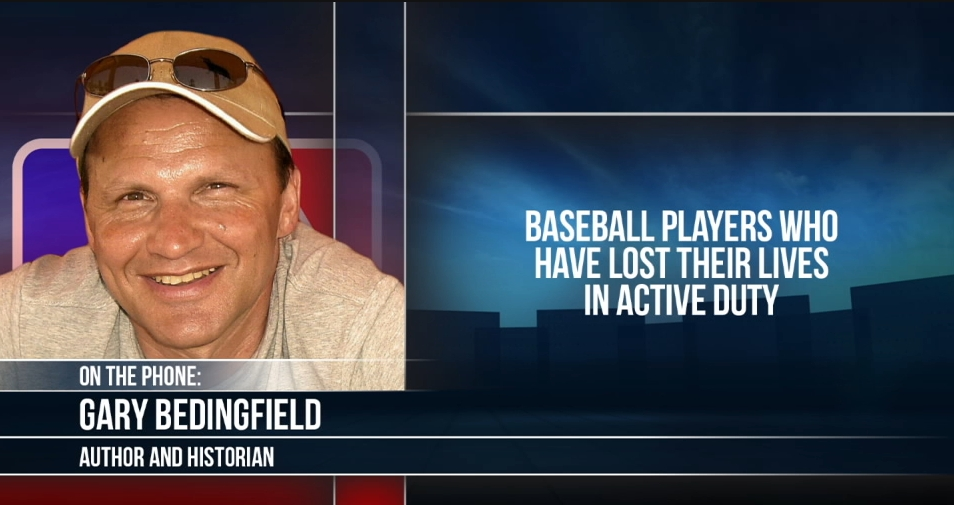

Gary Bedingfield (born 20 January 1963) is a British historian of baseball. He is a native of England and developed an interest in baseball as a youth. As a catcher, he played in competitive league baseball for over twenty years with the Enfield Spartans (British league champions in 1989, 1990 and 1991) and was a member of the Great Britain national baseball team (1986, 1989 and 1991).

In the 1990s he began work as a baseball historian and focused on the history of baseball during World War II. In 2000, he created the Baseball in Wartime website and launched a monthly Baseball in Wartime e-Newsletter in 2007. He was instrumental in arranging an announcement at every minor league ballpark on Memorial Day 2008 honouring the players who served during World War II and those who were killed in the war. Bedingfield is also the author of articles and three books about the history of baseball during the Second World War. Bedingfield maintains the only online biographical database of professional baseball players who were killed during World War II (there are currently 167 names in the database). In 2012, Bedingfield launched the "Baseball's Greatest Sacrifice" website dedicated to baseball players who lost their lives in military service. In 2007 Bedingfield was the keynote speaker at the When Baseball Went to War conference at the National World War II Museum in New Orleans.

After attending Enfield Grammar School, Bedingfield attained a further education teaching qualification at Southgate College. Bedingfield lives in North Ayrshire, Scotland.

== Works ==
- Baseball in World War II Europe. Charleston: Arcadia Publishing, 1999.
- (contributing author) When Baseball Went to War. Chicago: Triumph Books, 2008.
- Baseball's Dead of World War II: A Roster of Professional Players Who Died in Service. McFarland, 2010.
- Baseball in Hawaii During World War II. BiW Publishing, 2021.
- Aloha and Sayonara: The 1940 Keio University Baseball Tour of Hawaii. BiW Publishing, 2022.

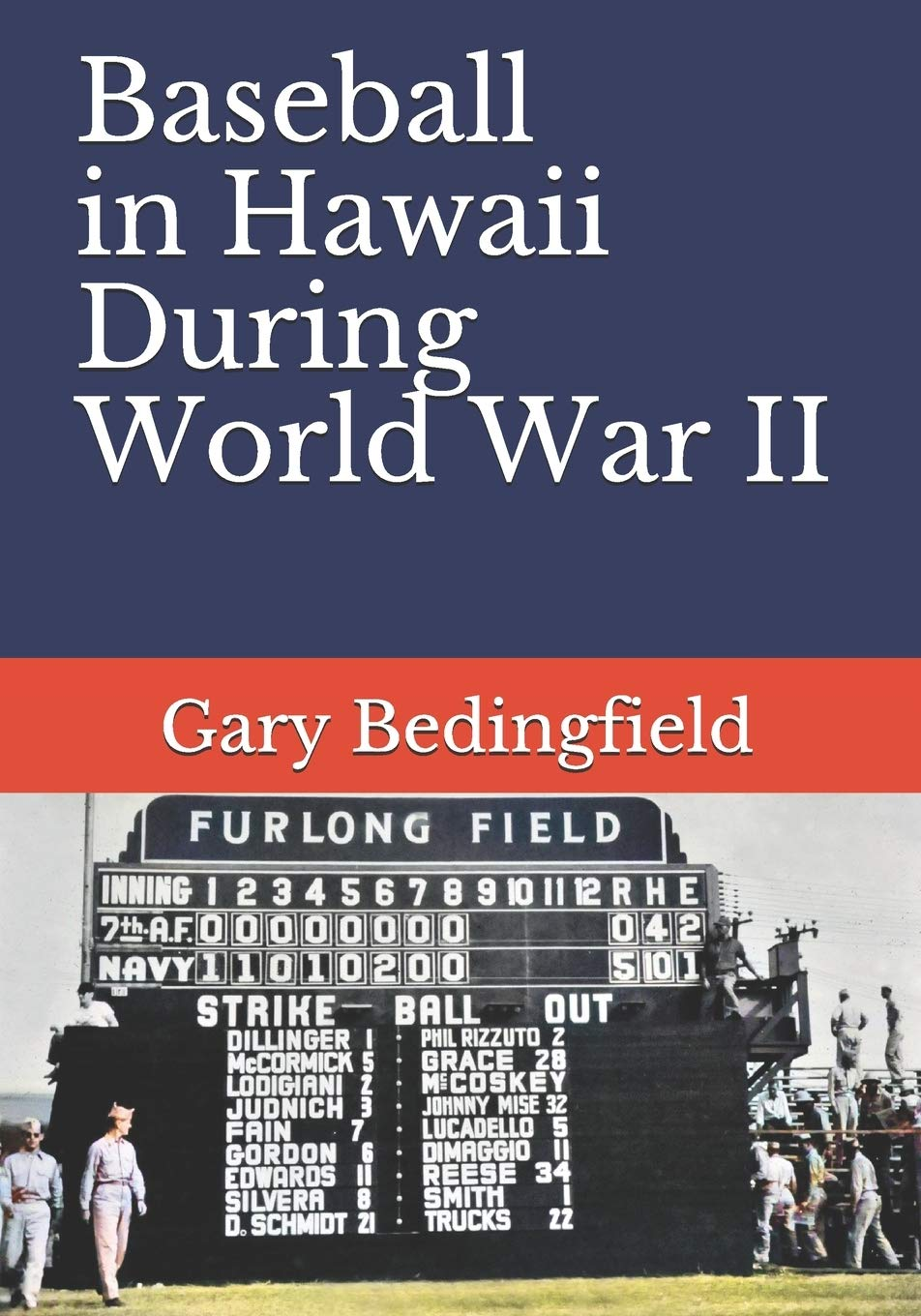
Front cover of "Baseball in Hawaii During World War II" by Gary Bedingfield
