= Edmund Bedingfield =

Sir Edmund Bedingfield or Bedingfeld (1479/80 – 1553) was an English landowner and steward of the household of Katherine of Aragon at Kimbolton Castle

== Family background ==
He was the third son of Sir Edmund Bedingfield, Knight of the Bath (who had licence to build Oxburgh Hall, Norfolk in 1482), and his second wife Dame Margaret, daughter of Sir John Scott (Marshal of Calais), of Scot's Hall in Kent. Sir Edmund the father died in 1496–97, making his will at Calais. His widow died in 1514, having made her will the previous year, in which she established the Bedingfield chapel in St John's parish church at Oxborough.

His eldest brother was Sir Thomas Bedingfield, who died without male issue. The second brother, Robert, was in holy orders, and therefore the estates passed him by, and descended to Edmund as heir. Bedingfield's sister Mary was the first wife of Sir Edward Echyngham.

== Career ==
Edmund Bedingfield married Grace Marney, daughter of Henry Marney, 1st Baron Marney, before 1509. She died in or after 1553.

In November 1523 Bedingfield was knighted for bravery by Charles Brandon, 1st Duke of Suffolk on the occasion of the taking of the French town of Montdidier, according to some sources, at the "field of Roye". Bedingfield went to France with Henry VIII in October 1532.

Subsequent to Henry VIII's Great Matter (his divorce), Edmund Bedingfield was entrusted with the custody of Katherine of Aragon at Kimbolton Castle and was steward of her household. He did not understand Spanish and had difficulty reporting to Thomas Cromwell about her conversations. Bedingfield and Edward Chamberleyn wrote to Cromwell with news of her death on 7 January 1536. Grace, Lady Bedingfield was appointed chief mourner for the funeral at Peterborough Cathedral and issued with black cloth for mourning clothes.

In 1539, Bedingfield inherited from his brother Robert the great estate of Oxburgh Hall, King's Lynn, Norfolk, and was chosen as an attendant of the Duke of Norfolk at the reception of Anne of Cleves.

His first son Sir Henry Bedingfield (by 1509–1583) succeeded to his estate in June 1553.
