= Sir Richard Bedingfeld, 5th Baronet =

English landowner and baronet

Sir Richard Bedingfeld, 5th Baronet (23 August 1767 – 22 November 1829), was an English landowner and baronet.

== Early life ==
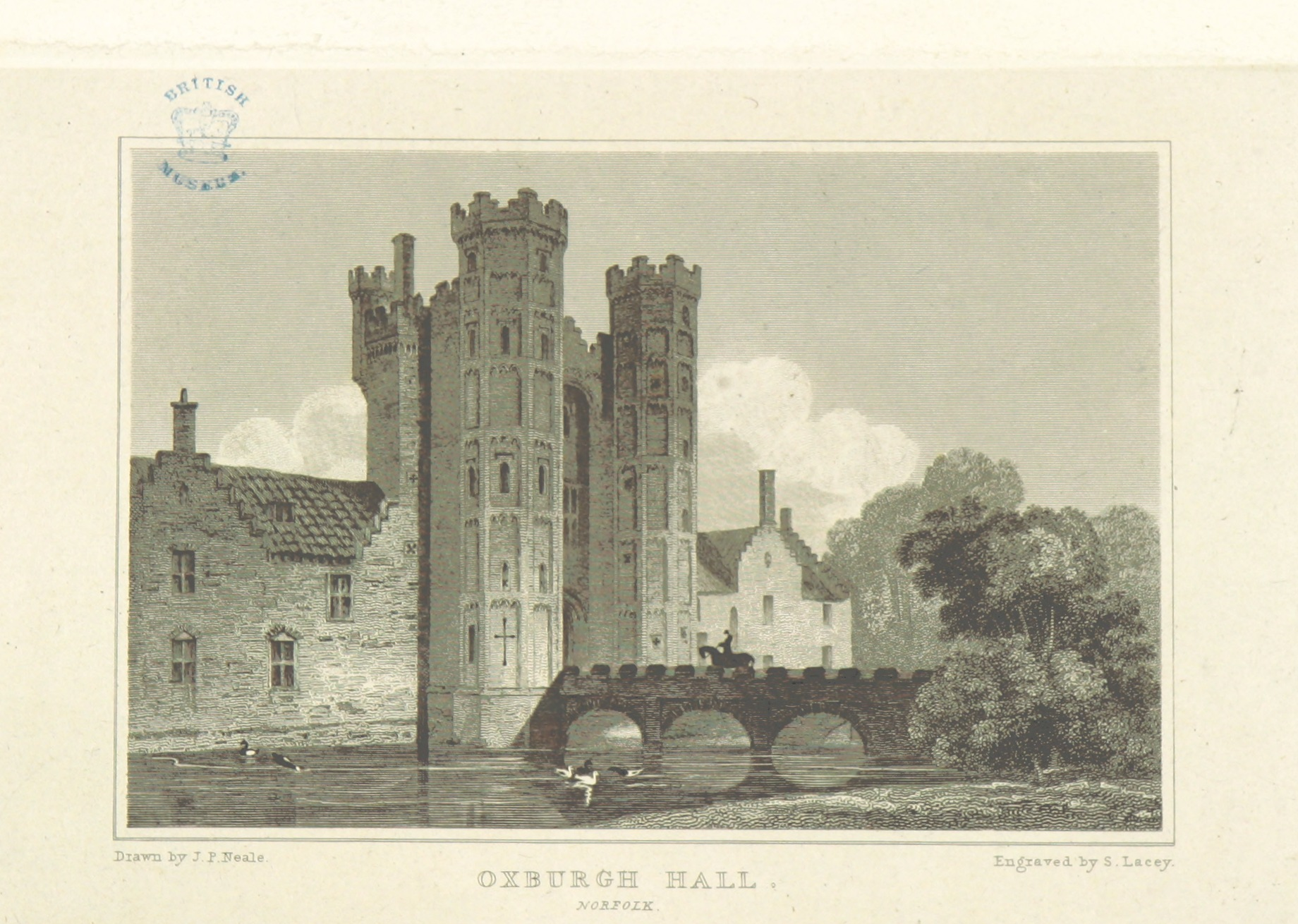
Oxburgh Hall, as found in Views of the Seats of Noblemen and Gentlemen in England, Wales, Scotland and Ireland. L.P, by John Preston Neale, 1818

Bedingfeld was born on 23 August 1767. He was the only son and heir of Sir Richard Bedingfeld, 4th Baronet (1720–1795) of Oxburgh Hall, and Hon. Mary Browne (1722–1767), who died from complications during childbirth.

His paternal grandparents were Sir Henry Bedingfeld, 3rd Baronet and Lady Elizabeth Boyle (a daughter of the 2nd Earl of Burlington). His maternal grandparents were Anthony Browne, 6th Viscount Montagu and Barbara Webb (a daughter of Sir John Webb, 3rd Baronet).

== Career ==
Upon the death of his father, who died intestate on 27 March 1795, he succeeded as the 5th Baronet Bedingfeld, of Oxburgh. He became the head of a distinguished Roman Catholic family which had "for several generations formed alliances with some of the most illustrious families of the peerage."

== Personal life ==
On 16 June 1795, Sir Richard married Charlotte Georgiana Jerningham, a daughter of Sir William Jerningham, 6th Baronet of Costessey and Hon. Frances Dillon (a daughter of the 11th Viscount Dillon), at St George's, Hanover Square. Among her siblings was brother George Stafford-Jerningham, 8th Baron Stafford. Together, they were the parents of four sons and four daughters, including:

- Frances "Fanny" Charlotte Bedingfeld (1796–1822), who married William Petre, 11th Baron Petre, son of Robert Petre, 10th Baron Petre and Mary Bridget Howard (sister of the 12th Duke of Norfolk), in 1815.
- Matilda Mary Bedingfeld (1797–1881), who married George Stanley Cary of Fullaton in Devonshire, son of Edward Cary and Camilla Annabella Fleming, in 1820.
- Agnes Mary Bedingfeld (1798–1870), who married Maj. Thomas Molyneux-Seel of Hurst House, Lancashire and Bolton Park, in 1823.
- Sir Henry Richard Paston-Bedingfeld, 6th Baronet (1800–1862), (Note: On 11 April 1830, his son, Henry Richard Bedingfeld, had his name legally changed to Henry Richard Paston-Bedingfeld by Royal Licence. In 1858, he was declared by the Committee of Privileges to be the heir of the barony of Grandison, which had been in abeyance for five centuries.) who married Margaret Anne Paston, daughter of Edward Paston, in 1826.
- Charlotte Eliza Bedingfeld (1802–1876), who became a nun.
- Charles Richard Bedingfeld (1803–1870), an officer in the Austrian service who married Agnes Waterton, daughter of C. Waterton of Woodlands, Yorkshire, in 1840.
- Edward Richard Bedingfeld (1805–1823), a midshipman in the Royal Navy who was drowned at sea in 1823.
- Felix William George Richard Bedingfeld (1808–1884), who married Mary Woodward Lightbourn Chads, eldest daughter of John Cornell Chads, Governor of the British Virgin Islands, in 1849.

Sir Richard died in Windsor on 22 November 1829 while on his way to London to visit Lord Dillon at Ditchley. He was succeeded in the baronetcy by his son, Henry. His will was proven (by probate) in February 1830. His widow, who was granted the precedence of the daughter of a baron in 1831, was a Woman of the Bedchamber to Queen Adelaide, died in London on 29 July 1854.

=== Descendants ===
Through his eldest daughter Fanny, who died in childbirth, he was a grandfather of four, including William Bernard Petre, 12th Baron Petre (1817–1884), Hon. Mary Agness Petre (wife of James Alexander Douglas), politician Hon. Henry William Petre (father of Francis Petre), and Hon. Charlotte Elizabeth Petre (wife of Capt. Charles Edward Petre).

Through his only son Henry, he was a grandfather of Matilda Charlotte Paston-Bedingfeld (wife of George Henry Neville), Mary Gabrielle Paston-Bedingfeld (wife of Ferdinand John Eyre), Mary Geraldine Paston-Bedingfeld (wife of Edward Southwell Trafford), Sir Henry Paston-Bedingfeld, 7th Baronet (who married Augusta Lucy Clavering), and Lt.-Col. Raoul Stephen Paston-Bedingfeld of the Prince of Wales's Own Norfolk Artillery (who married Katherine Gregory Walker).

Baronetage of England
Preceded by Richard Henry Bedingfeld	Baronet (of Oxburgh); 1795–1829	Succeeded by Henry Richard Paston-Bedingfeld
