= Sir Henry Paston-Bedingfeld, 6th Baronet =

English landowner and baronet

Sir Henry Paston-Bedingfeld, Bt JP DL
- Born: Henry Richard Bedingfeld; 10 May 1800; Oxborough, Norfolk
- Died: 4 February 1862 (aged 61); Oxborough, Norfolk
- Spouse: Margaret Paston (1826–1862)
- Children: 5, including Matilda and Henry
- Parent(s): Sir Richard Bedingfeld, 5th Baronet; Charlotte Georgiana Jerningham
- Relatives: Sir William Jerningham, 6th Baronet (grandfather); George Stafford-Jerningham, 8th Baron Stafford (uncle)

Sir Henry Richard Paston-Bedingfeld, 6th Baronet JP DL (born Bedingfeld; 10 May 1800 – 4 February 1862), was an English landowner and baronet.

== Early life ==
Born Henry Richard Bedingfeld on 10 May 1800 at Oxborough in Norfolk, he was the eldest son of Sir Richard Bedingfeld, 5th Baronet, of Oxburgh Hall, and Charlotte Georgiana Jerningham. Among his siblings were Frances "Fanny" Bedingfeld (wife of William Petre, 11th Baron Petre), Matilda Bedingfeld (wife of George Stanley Cary), Agnes Bedingfeld (wife of Maj. Thomas Molyneux-Seel), Charlotte Bedingfeld (who became a nun), Charles Richard Bedingfeld (who married Agnes Waterton), Edward Richard Bedingfeld (a midshipman in the Royal Navy who was drowned at sea in 1823), and Felix William George Richard Bedingfeld (who married Mary Woodward Lightbourn Chads, eldest daughter of John Cornell Chads, Governor of the British Virgin Islands).

His father was the only son and heir of Sir Richard Bedingfeld, 4th Baronet and Hon. Mary Browne (a daughter of the 6th Viscount Montagu), who died from complications during childbirth. His maternal grandparents were Sir William Jerningham, 6th Baronet of Costessey and Hon. Frances Dillon (a daughter of the 11th Viscount Dillon). Among his paternal family was uncle George Stafford-Jerningham, 8th Baron Stafford.

== Career ==
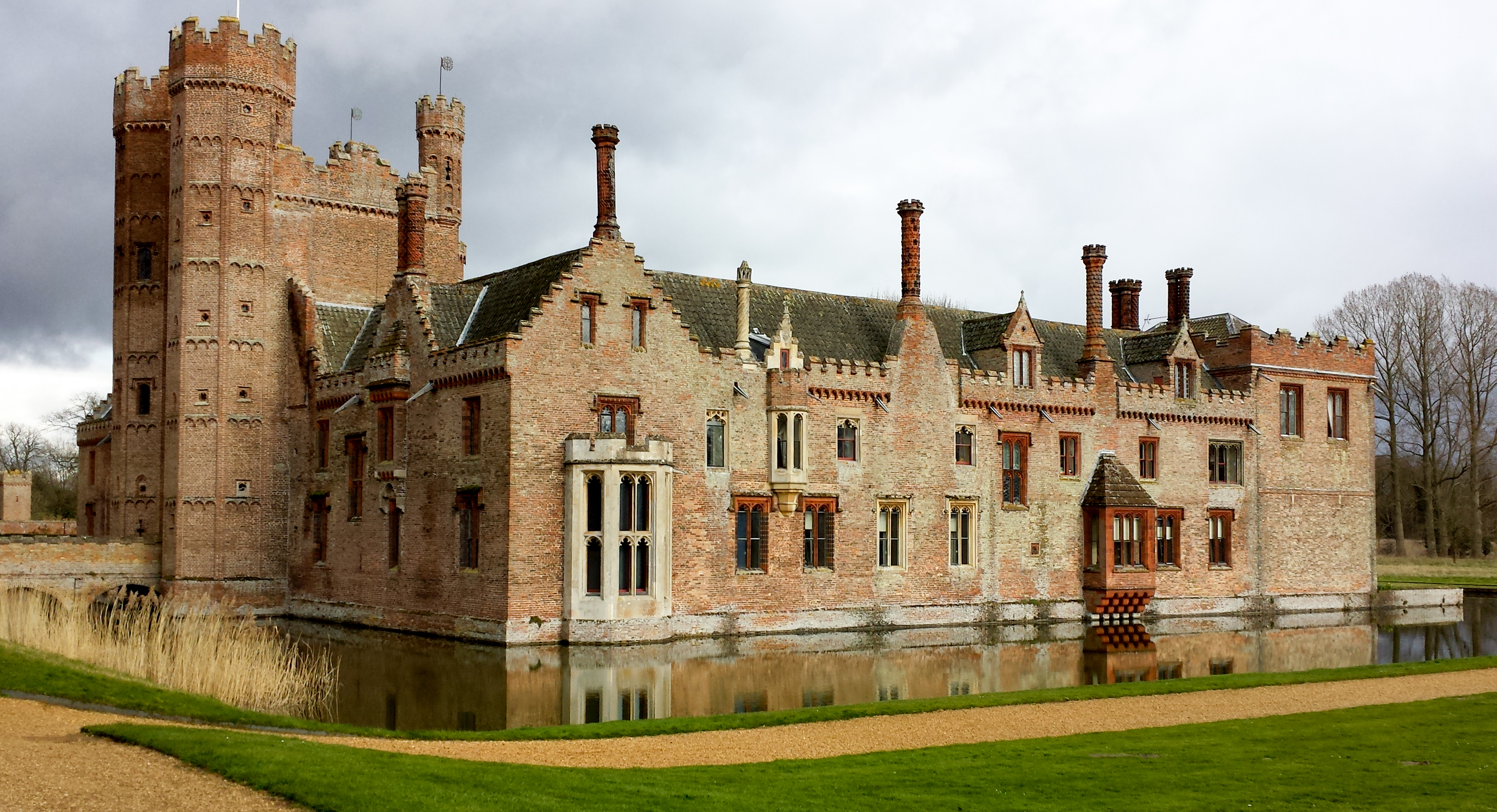
Oxburgh Hall, Norfolk, as rebuilt by Buckler

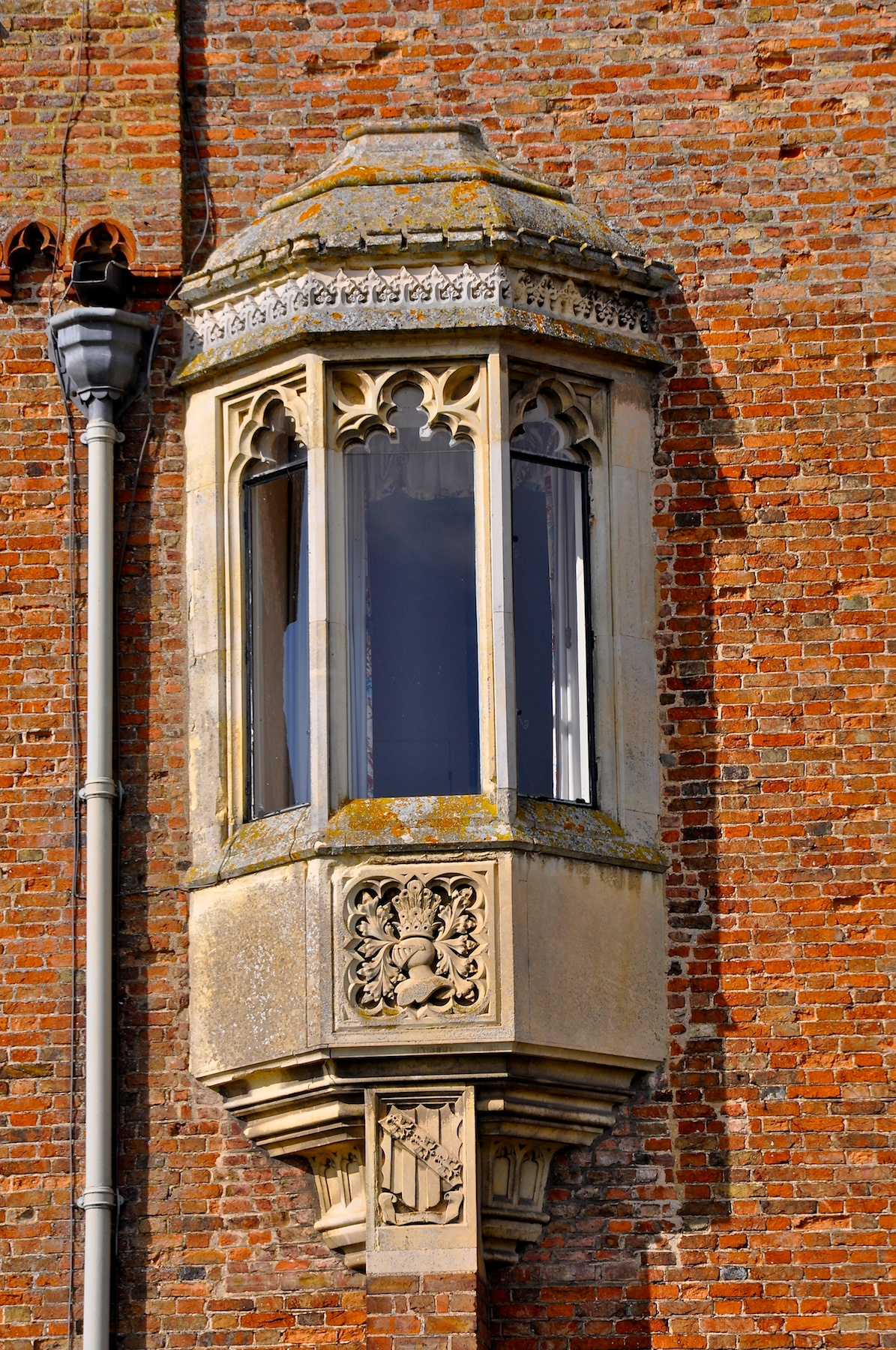
Arms of Grandison sculpted on an oriel window at Oxburgh Hall, Norfolk.

Upon the death of his father on 22 November 1829, he succeeded as the 6th Baronet Bedingfeld, of Oxburgh, becoming the head of a distinguished Roman Catholic family which had "for several generations formed alliances with some of the most illustrious families of the peerage." On 11 April 1830, he had his name legally changed to Henry Richard Paston-Bedingfeld by Royal Licence. In 1858, after five centuries in abeyance, he was declared by the Committee of Privileges to be one of the co-heirs of the Barony of Grandison "through "the families of Paston, Tuddenham, Patteshull, and Grandison, heir to Dame Katherine Tuddenham, in whom one-fourth of a third of the representation of the Barony of Grandison had vested."

In the 1860s, he employed English architect John Chessell Buckler to extensively remodel his families Oxburgh Hall estate. In 1841, his wife inherited the Brailes estate in Warwickshire.

From 1831, he served as a Justice of the Peace and Deputy Lieutenant for Norfolk.

== Personal life ==
On 30 August 1826, Bedingfeld married Margaret Paston (c. 1807–1887), only daughter and heiress of Lucy (née Brown) Paston and Edward Paston, of Appleton, Norfolk, the last of the Pastons of Paston, formerly Earls of Yarmouth. Together, they were the parents of two sons and three daughters, including:

- Matilda Charlotte Paston-Bedingfeld (1827–1905), who married Capt. George Henry Nevill, of Nevill Holt, a son of Charles Nevill and Lady Georgiana Bingham (a daughter of the 2nd Earl of Lucan) in 1855.
- Sir Henry George Paston-Bedingfeld, 7th Baronet (1830–1902), who married Augusta Lucy Clavering, only child of Edward Clavering, of Callaly Castle, in 1859.
- Raoul Stephen Paston-Bedingfeld (1835–1910), a Lt.-Col. of the Prince of Wales's Own Norfolk Artillery who married Katherine Gregory (née Walker) Stephens, widow of Henry Claremont Lyne Stephens, of Grove House, Roehampton, and daughter of Edward Walker, of Henbury Manor, Wimborne, in 1897.
- Mary Geraldine Paston-Bedingfeld (1840–1869), who married Edward Southwell Trafford, of Honington Hall, Grantham, a son of Edward William Trafford, of Brundall House and Wroxham Hall, and Louisa Thistlethwayte, in 1867.
- Mary Gabrielle Paston-Bedingfeld (c. 1846–1937), who married Ferdinand John Eyre, of Moreton Hall, Bury St Edmunds, youngest son of V. A. Eyre, of Lindley Hall, Leicestershire, in 1880.

Sir Henry died, aged 61, on 4 February 1862 at Oxborough, and was buried in the chapel at Oxburgh Hall, 11 February 1862. His wife, who took the surname Paston-Bishopp-Bedingfeld by royal licence in 1841, had reverted to Paston-Bedingfeld before her death in Bath on 31 January 1887.

Baronetage of England
Preceded by Richard Bedingfeld	Baronet (of Oxburgh); 1829–1862	Succeeded by Henry George Paston-Bedingfeld
