= Sir Henry Paston-Bedingfeld, 7th Baronet =

English landowner

Sir Henry Paston-Bedingfeld, Bt DL
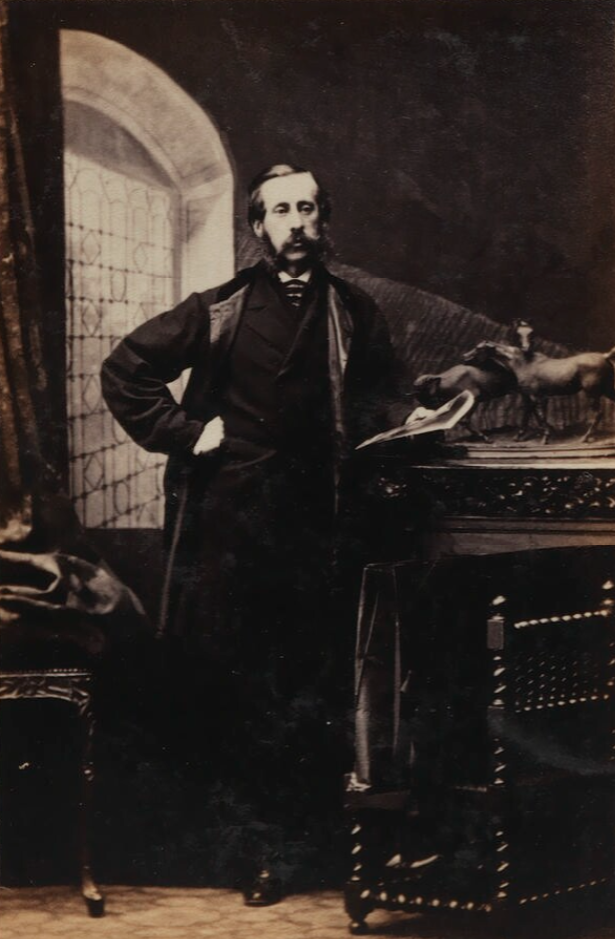
- Photograph of Sir Henry by Camille Silvy, 1863

High Sheriff of Norfolk
- In office 1882–1882
- Preceded by: George Duckett Berney
- Succeeded by: William Earle Gascoyne Lytton Bulwer

Personal details
- Born: Henry George Paston-Bedingfeld; 21 June 1830; Norwich, Norfolk
- Died: 18 January 1902 (aged 71); Cromwell Road, London
- Spouse: Augusta Lucy Clavering (m. 1859)
- Children: 11
- Parent(s): Sir Henry Paston-Bedingfeld, 6th Baronet; Margaret Paston
- Education: Stonyhurst College

Sir Henry George Paston-Bedingfeld, 7th Baronet DL (21 June 1830 – 18 January 1902) was an English landowner.

== Early life ==
He was the eldest son of Sir Henry Paston-Bedingfeld, 6th Baronet, of Oxburgh Hall, and heiress Margaret Paston, who inherited the Brailes estate in Warwickshire in 1841. His younger brother, Raoul, married Katherine Gregory (née Walker) Stephens, widow of Henry Alexander Claremont Lyne-Stephens.

His paternal grandparents were Sir Richard Bedingfeld, 5th Baronet and Charlotte Georgiana Jerningham. Among his extended paternal family was aunt Frances "Fanny" Bedingfeld (wife of William Petre, 11th Baron Petre), Matilda Bedingfeld (wife of George Stanley Cary), Agnes Bedingfeld (wife of Maj. Thomas Molyneux-Seel), and uncle Felix Bedingfeld (who married Mary Woodward Lightbourn Chads, eldest daughter of John Cornell Chads, Governor of the British Virgin Islands). His maternal grandparents were Lucy (née Brown) Paston and Edward Paston, of Appleton, Norfolk, the last of the Pastons of Paston, formerly Earls of Yarmouth.

A member of a prominent English Roman Catholic family, he was educated at Stonyhurst College.

== Career ==
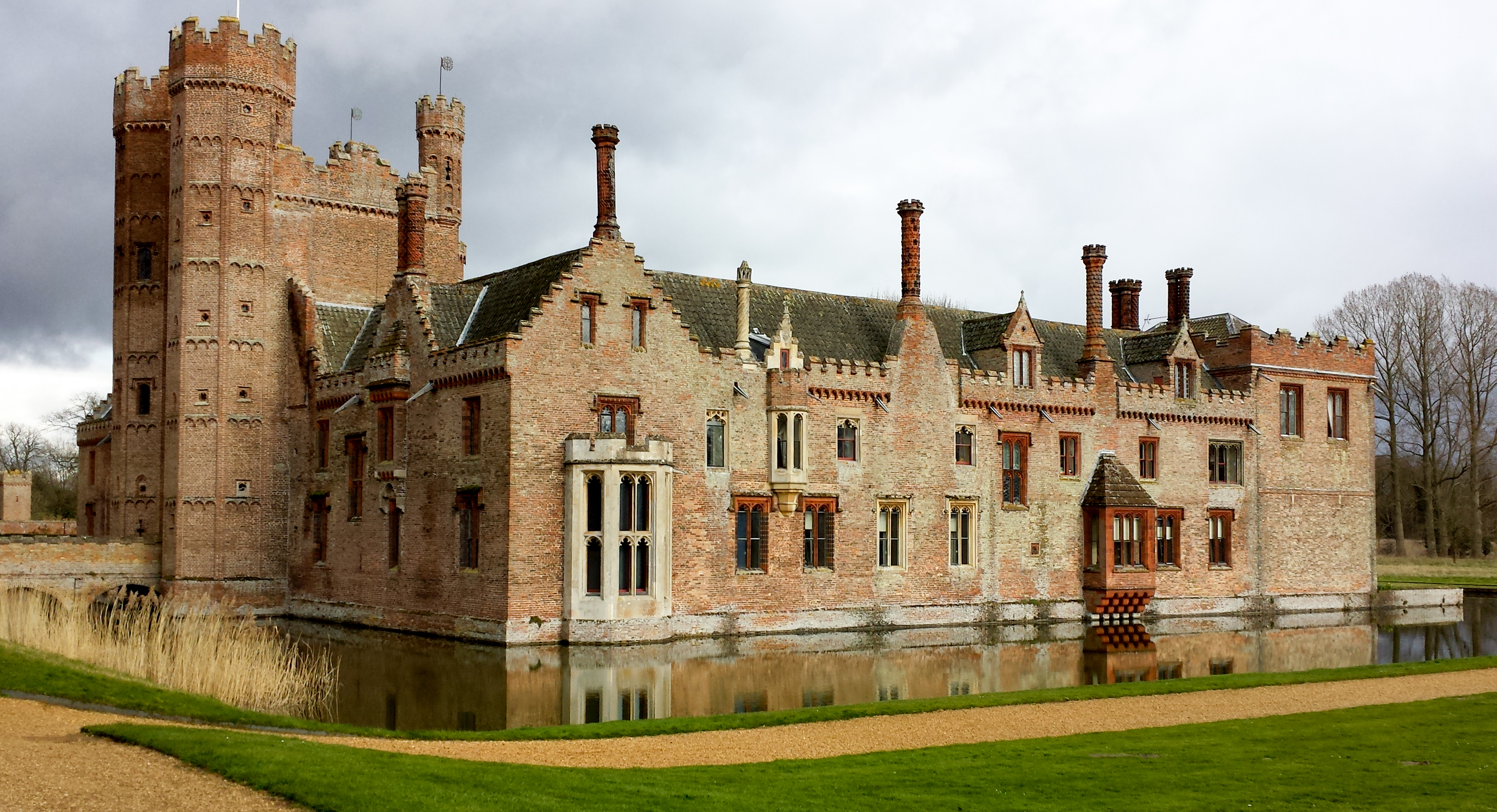
The Bedingfeld seat, Oxburgh Hall, Norfolk

As a young man, he served for some time with the Austrian Cuirassiers before becoming a captain in the West Norfolk Militia.

Upon the death of his father on 4 February 1862, he succeeded his father as 7th Baronet Paston-Bedingfeld, of Oxburgh. He also served as a Deputy Lieutenant for Norfolk and was High Sheriff of Norfolk in 1882.

== Personal life ==
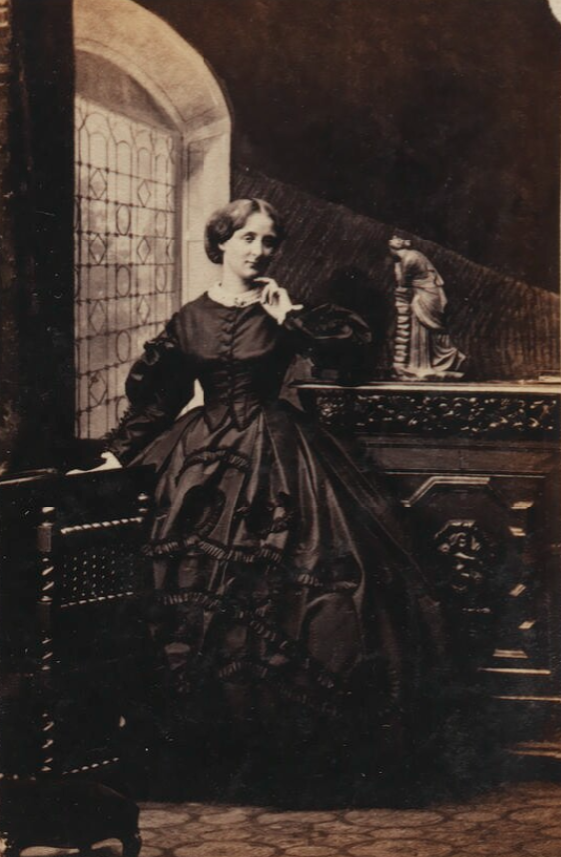
Photograph of Augusta, Lady Paston-Bedingfeld by Camille Silvy, 1863

On 17 October 1859, he married Augusta Lucy Clavering (d. 1929), only child of Edward John Clavering, of Callaly Castle. Together, they were the parents of:

- Sir Henry Edward Paston-Bedingfeld, 8th Baronet (1860–1941), a Major in the Liverpool Regiment who served in the Boer War; he married Sybil Lyne-Stephens, eldest daughter of Henry Alexander Claremont Lyne-Stephens of Grove House, Roehampton (son of Edward Stopford Claremont), in 1904.
- Richard Henry Clavering Paston-Bedingfeld (1862–1931), who emigrated to United States, where he bought land in Wyoming in 1897, and later to Canada; he died unmarried.
- Alice Mary Paston-Bedingfeld (1863–1947), who was awarded the Order of the Chefakat; she married Vice-Adm. James Lacon Hammet, Admiral Superintendent of Malta Dockyard, in 1891. After his death in 1905, she married Cdr. Hon. Clement La Primaudaye, Commissioner of the Malta Police Force, in 1906.
- Charles Paston-Bedingfeld (1864–1936), who also emigrated to United States and bought land in Wyoming in 1897 where he raised cattle; later became a gold miner; he died unmarried.
- Mary Maud Paston-Bedingfeld (1866–1962), who became a nun of the Society of the Holy Child Jesus.
- Mary Augusta Paston-Bedingfeld (1868–1868), who died in infancy.
- Edward Arthur Paston-Bedingfeld (1870–1878), who died young.
- William Felix Paston-Bedingfeld (1873–1911), who emigrated to South Africa and worked as a wine and spirit merchant in Middleburg; he died unmarried.
- Francis Augustus Paston-Bedingfeld (1874–1950), who also emigrated to South Africa after his 1926 marriage to Dorothy Mary Hooker of Kingston upon Thames.
- Edith Mary Paston-Bedingfeld (1876–1972), who also became a nun of the Society of the Holy Child Jesus.
- Hubert Paston-Bedingfeld (1877–1956), who emigrated to the United States with his brother Charles; he also died unmarried.

Sir Henry died on 18 January 1902, at age 71, at 45 Cromwell Houses, Cromwell Road, Royal Borough of Kensington and Chelsea, London. Lady Paston-Bedingfeld died on 2 March 1929.

Baronetage of England
Preceded by Henry Richard Paston-Bedingfeld	Baronet (of Oxburgh); 1862–1902	Succeeded by Henry Edward Paston-Bedingfeld
