= Henry Bedingfeld (disambiguation) =

Sir Henry Bedingfeld (1506–1583) was an English privy councillor and Vice-Chamberlain of the Household, MP for Norfolk and Suffolk.

Henry Bedingfeld may also refer to:

- Sir Henry Bedingfeld, 1st Baronet (1614–1685) of the Bedingfeld Baronets
- Sir Henry Bedingfeld, 2nd Baronet (1636–1704) of the Bedingfeld Baronets
- Sir Henry Bedingfeld, 3rd Baronet (died 1760) of the Bedingfeld Baronets

== See also ==
- Henry Paston-Bedingfeld (disambiguation)
- Henry Bedingfield (disambiguation)
