= Henry Paston-Bedingfeld (disambiguation) =

Henry Paston-Bedingfeld, 10th baronet, (born 1943), retired King-at-Arms of the College of Arms in London and former member of the Royal Household.

Henry Paston-Bedingfeld may also refer to:

- Sir Henry Richard Paston-Bedingfeld, 6th Baronet (1800–1862) of the Paston-Bedingfeld baronets
- Sir Henry George Paston-Bedingfeld, 7th Baronet (1830–1902) of the Paston-Bedingfeld baronets
- Sir Henry Edward Paston-Bedingfeld, 8th Baronet (1860–1941) of the Paston-Bedingfeld baronets
- Sir Henry Richard Paston-Bedingfeld, 6th Baronet (1800–1862) of the Paston-Bedingfeld baronets
- Sir Henry George Paston-Bedingfeld, 7th Baronet (1830–1902) of the Paston-Bedingfeld baronets

== See also ==
- Henry Bedingfeld (disambiguation)
