= List of colonial governors of the British Virgin Islands =

List of colonial governors of the British Virgin Islands

Term	Incumbent	Notes
English colony
1666		
1741	John Pickering	President
1742 to 1750	John Hunt	President
1750 to 1751	James Purcell	President
1751 to 1775	John Purcell	President
1775 to 1782	John Nugent	President
1782 to 1811	...	President
1811 to 18..	Richard Hetherington	President
Part of the Leeward Islands
1833 to 1839		
1839 to 1850	Edward Hay Drummond Hay	President
1852 to 1854	John Cornell Chads	President
1854 to 1857	Cornelius Hendricksen Kortright	President
1859 to 1861	Thomas Price	President
1861 to 1864	James Robert Longden	President
1866 to 1869	Sir Arthur Carlos Henry Rumbold	President
1869 to 1872	Alexander Wilson Muir	President
1873 to 1879	Richard Mahoney Hickson	President
1879 to 1882	John Kemys Spencer-Churchill	President
1882 to 1884	Richard Henry Kortright Dyett	President
1884 to 1887	Fredrick Augustus Pickering	President
1887 to 1893	Edward John Cameron	Administrator
1894 to 1896	Alexander R. Mackay	Administrator
1896 to 1903	Nathaniel George Cookman	Administrator
1903 to 1910	Robert Stephen Earl	Administrator
1910 to 1919	Thomas Leslie Hardtman Jarvis	Administrator
1919 to 1922	Herbert Walter Peebles	Administrator
1922 to 1923	R. Hargrove	Administrator
1923 to 1926	Otho Lewis Hancock	Administrator
1926 to 1934	Frank Cecil Clarkson	Administrator
1934 to 1946	Donald Percy Wailling	Administrator
1946 to 1954	John Augustus Cockburn Cruikshank	Administrator
1954 to 1956	Henry Howard	Administrator
1956 to 1959	Geoffrey Poole Allsebrook	Administrator
1959 to 1 January 1960	Gerald Jackson Bryan	Administrator
1 January 1960	Dissolution of the Leeward Islands	
1 January 1960 to 1962	Gerald Jackson Bryan	Administrator
1962 to 1967	Martin Samuel Staveley	Administrator
1967 to 1971	John Sutherland Thomson	Administrator
1971 to 1974	Derek George Cudmore	Governor
1974 to 1978	Walter Wilkinson Wallace	Governor
1978 to 1981	James Alfred Davidson	Governor
1982 to 1986	David Robert Barwick	Governor
1986 to 1991	J. Mark A. Herdman	Governor
14 October 1991 to 21 June 1995	Peter Alfred Penfold	Governor
21 June 1995 to 1998	David Mackilligin	Governor
3 July 1998 to 5 October 2002	Frank Savage	Governor
5 October 2002 to 14 October 2002	Elton Georges	Acting Governor
14 October 2002 to 18 April 2006	Tom Macan	Governor
18 April 2006 to 5 August 2010	David Pearey	Governor
20 August 2010 to 1 August 2014	William Boyd McCleary	Governor
15 August 2014 to 22 August 2017	John S. Duncan OBE	Governor
22 August 2017 to present	Augustus Jaspert	Governor
