= Sir Henry Bedingfeld, 1st Baronet =

English Baronet

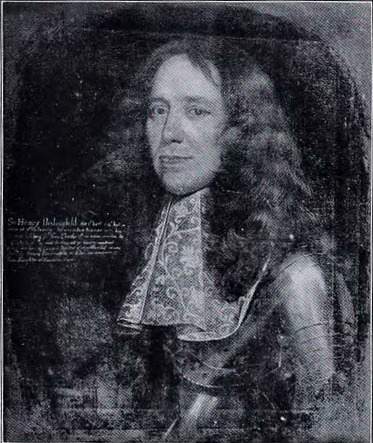
- Born: September 1614
- Died: 24 February 1685 (aged 70–71)
- Spouse(s): Margaret Paston
- Children: 8
- Parent(s): Henry Bedingfield; Elizabeth Houghton

Sir Henry Bedingfeld, 1st Baronet (September 1614 – 24 February 1685) was a landowner and baronet.

== Early life ==
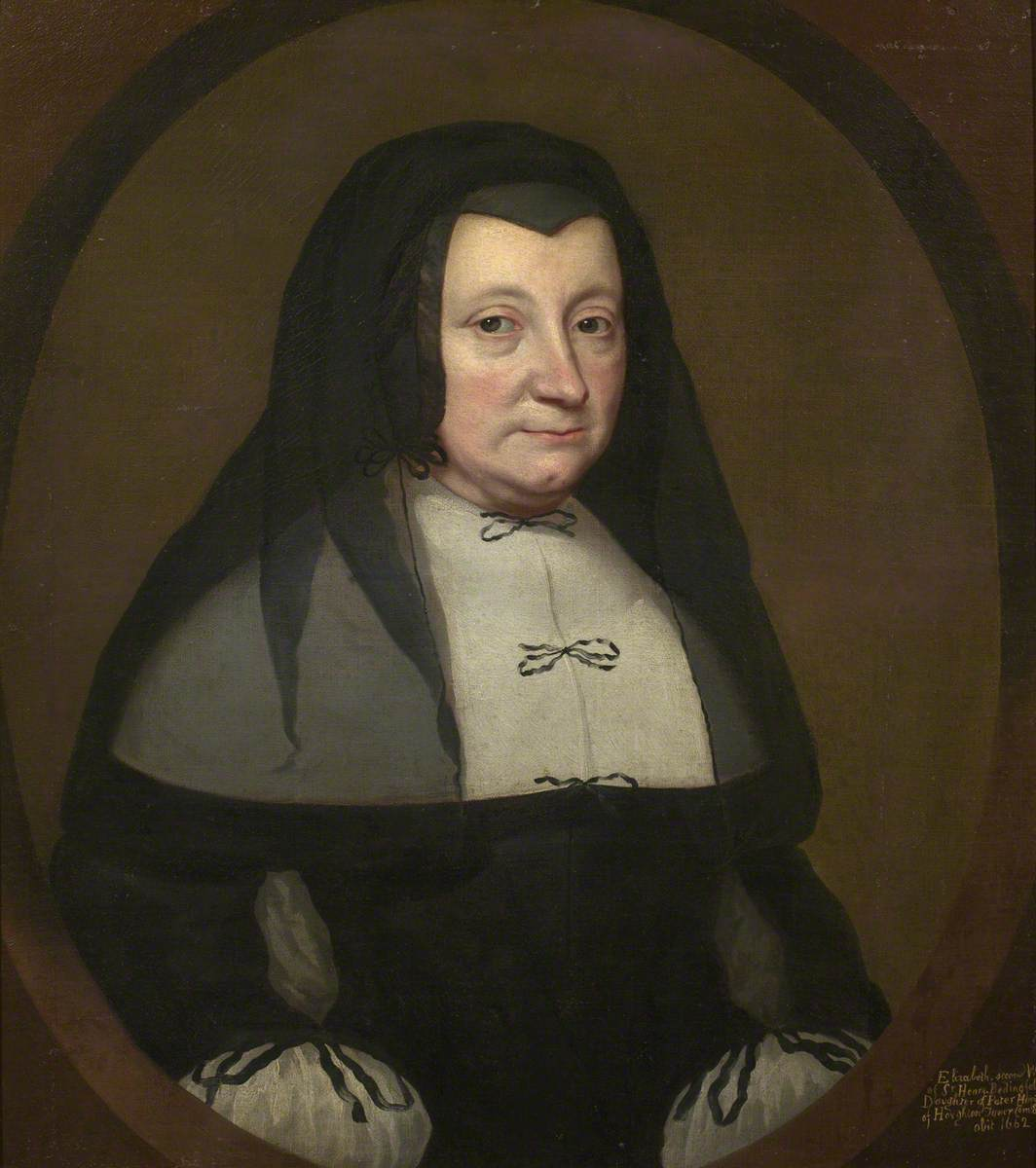
Portrait of his mother, Elizabeth, Lady Bedingfield, at the age of 60 in 1650

He was the eldest son of Sir Henry Bedingfield of Oxburgh Hall (c. 1587–1657) by his second marriage to Elizabeth Houghton (1590–1662). The family were Catholics.

His paternal grandparents were the former Frances Jernegan (daughter and co-heiress of John Jernegan of Somerleyton) and Thomas Bedingfield of Oxburgh (himself the great-grandson of Sir Henry Bedingfield). After his grandfather's death, his grandmother married, as his second wife, Sir Henry Jerningham of Cossey. His maternal grandfather was Peter Houghton of Houghton Towers in Lancashire who was an Alderman and Sheriff of London.

== Career ==
His father, an MP for Norfolk, and elder half-brother, Col. Thomas Bedingfield (c. 1605–1685), were both active in the Royalist cause during the English Civil War and spent time in prison and with the exiles on the Continent. The family's estate was impoverished by the parliamentary exactions for their royalism and their recusancy. Following the restoration of Charles II, Col. Thomas Bedingfield began the process of attempting to recover his estate. In a petition to the King, he calculated the loss to be £60,000, of which he had been paid £21,000. Presumably as compensation for the unrecovered loss, as heir apparent to Thomas, Henry Bedingfield, a Captain in the King's Army, was created a baronet in January 1661 as his elder half-brother had no son.

In 1685, Henry inherited Oxburgh from his half-brother Thomas, although the hall was too dilapidated for habitation.

== Personal life ==
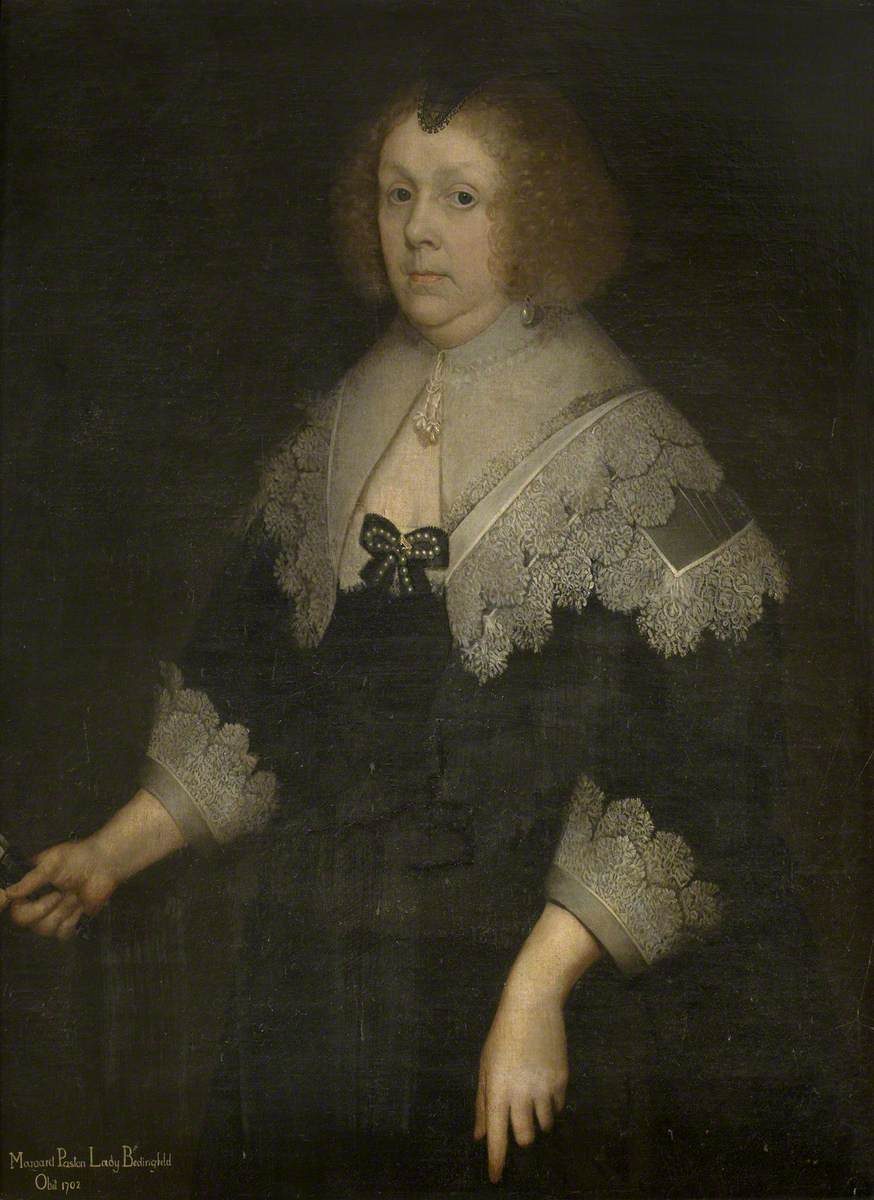
Portrait of his widow, Margaret (née Paston), Lady Bedingfeld

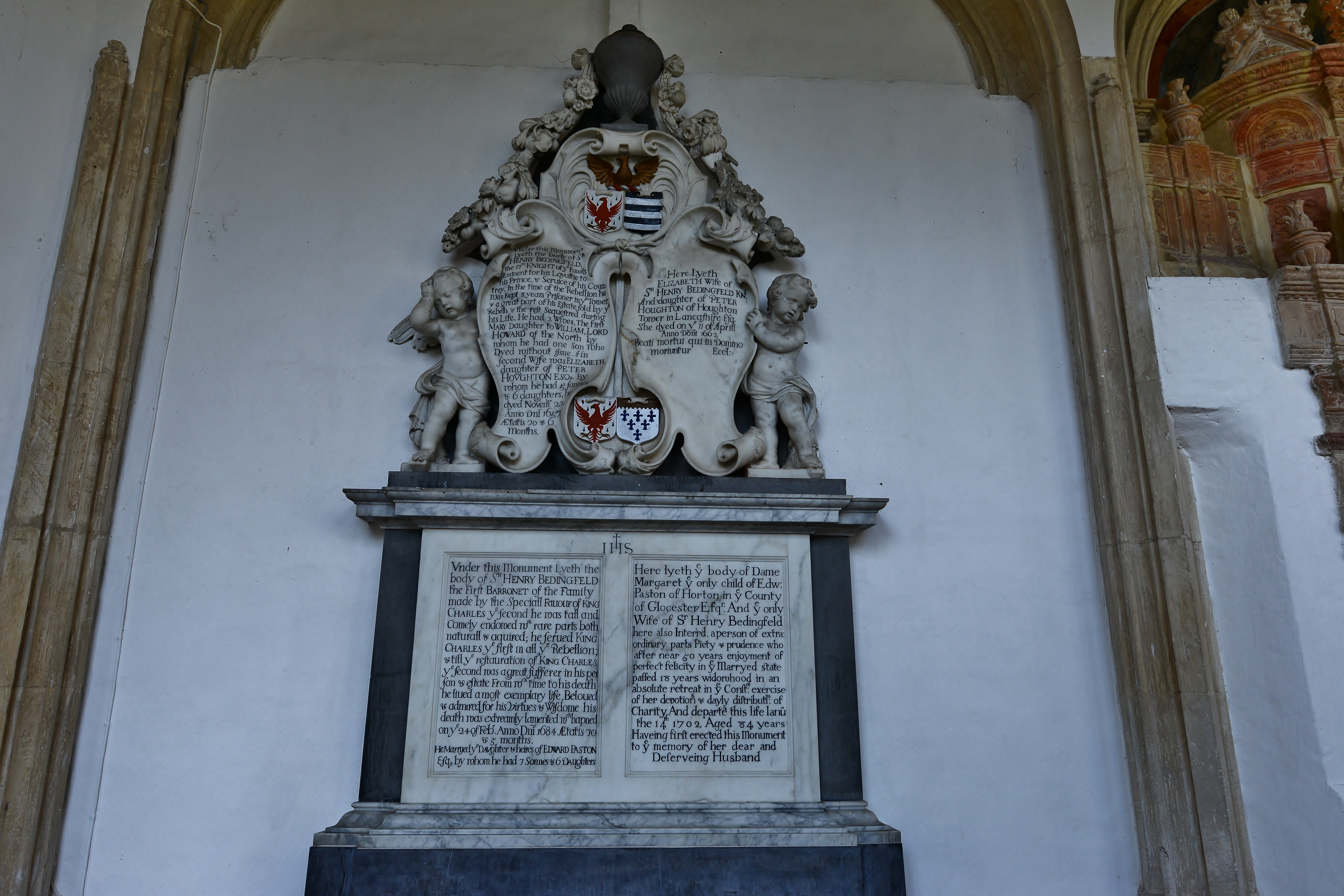
The Church of St. John the Evangelist, Bedingfield Chapel, Oxborough

In April 1635, Bedingfeld married Margaret Paston (c. 1619–1703), a daughter of Frances Sydenham and Edward Paston of Appleton, Norfolk. Together, they were the parents of:

- Sir Henry Bedingfeld, 2nd Baronet (d. 1704), who accompanied Henry Stuart, Duke of Gloucester to England in 1660; he married Lady Anne Howard, a daughter of Charles Howard, 2nd Earl of Berkshire. After her death, he married Elizabeth Arundell, a daughter of Sir John Arundell of Lanherne, Cornwall.
- John Bedingfeld (d. 1693), who married Dorothy Ramsey, daughter and co-heiress of John Ramsey, Esq.
- Edward Bedingfeld, a barrister who married Mary Fisher, sister of Sir Clement Fisher, 3rd Baronet.
- Elizabeth Bedingfeld, who married Thomas Weetenhall Esq.
- Johanna Bedingfeld, who married Richard Caryll, Esq. of Harting, Sussex.
- Mary Bedingfeld, who married Thomas Eyre, Esq. of Hassop Hall, Derbyshire.
- Anne Bedingfeld, who became a Carmelite nun at Lierre.
- Margaret Bedingfeld, who also became a Carmelite nun at Lierre.

Sir Henry, who died on 24 February 1685, and his parents are commemorated by a monument erected by his widow in the Bedingfield chapel in St John's Church, Oxborough.

=== Descendants ===
Through his eldest son Henry's second marriage to Elizabeth Arundell, he was a grandfather of Sir Henry Bedingfeld, 3rd Baronet (d. 1760), Margaret Bedingfeld (wife of Sir John Jerningham, 4th Baronet) and Frances Bedingfeld (wife of Sir Francis Anderton, 6th Baronet).

Through his son Edward, he was a grandfather of Mary Bedingfield, who married Sir John Swinburne, 3rd Baronet of Capheaton, Northumberland, a son of Sir William Swinburne, 2nd Baronet.

Baronetage of England
New creation	Baronet (of Oxburgh); 1660-1685	Succeeded by Sir Henry Bedingfeld (1636-1704)
