= Baron Grandison =

Extinct barony in the Peerage of England

Arms of Otto Grandison, Baron Grandison: Paly of six argent and azure, on a bend gules three escallops or

Arms of Grandison: Paly of six argent and azure, on a bend gules three eagles displayed or

Baron Grandison was by modern doctrine a title in the Peerage of England created for two brothers, Sir Otton de Grandson and Sir William Grandison, who were summoned to Parliament in 1299. Any hereditary barony for Sir Otho lapsed on his death in 1328, as did that for Sir William on the death of his grandson Thomas Grandison in 1375.

The family originated in what is now the Swiss canton of Vaud by the name of Grandson, the anglicised Grandison was a shortening of the Latin form Grandisono. The family origins lay in the grant of land by Lake Neuchâtel during the last years of the Second Kingdom of Burgundy.

== Simplified descent ==
Pierre de Grandson (c1186-died 1258) marries Agnès de Neuchâtel, their children include

- Otto de Grandson (c1238-died 1328). Sheriff of Tipperary, Lord of the Channel Islands, Lieutenant of Gascony and Justiciar of North Wales
- Gérard de Grandson (1239-died 1278), Bishop of Verdun
- Henri de Grandson (c1252-died 1284), Pastor of Greystoke, Cumberland, Bishop of Verdun
- Jacques de Grandson (c1241-c1291), Seigneur de Belmont from whom the Swiss famille de Grandson will descend.

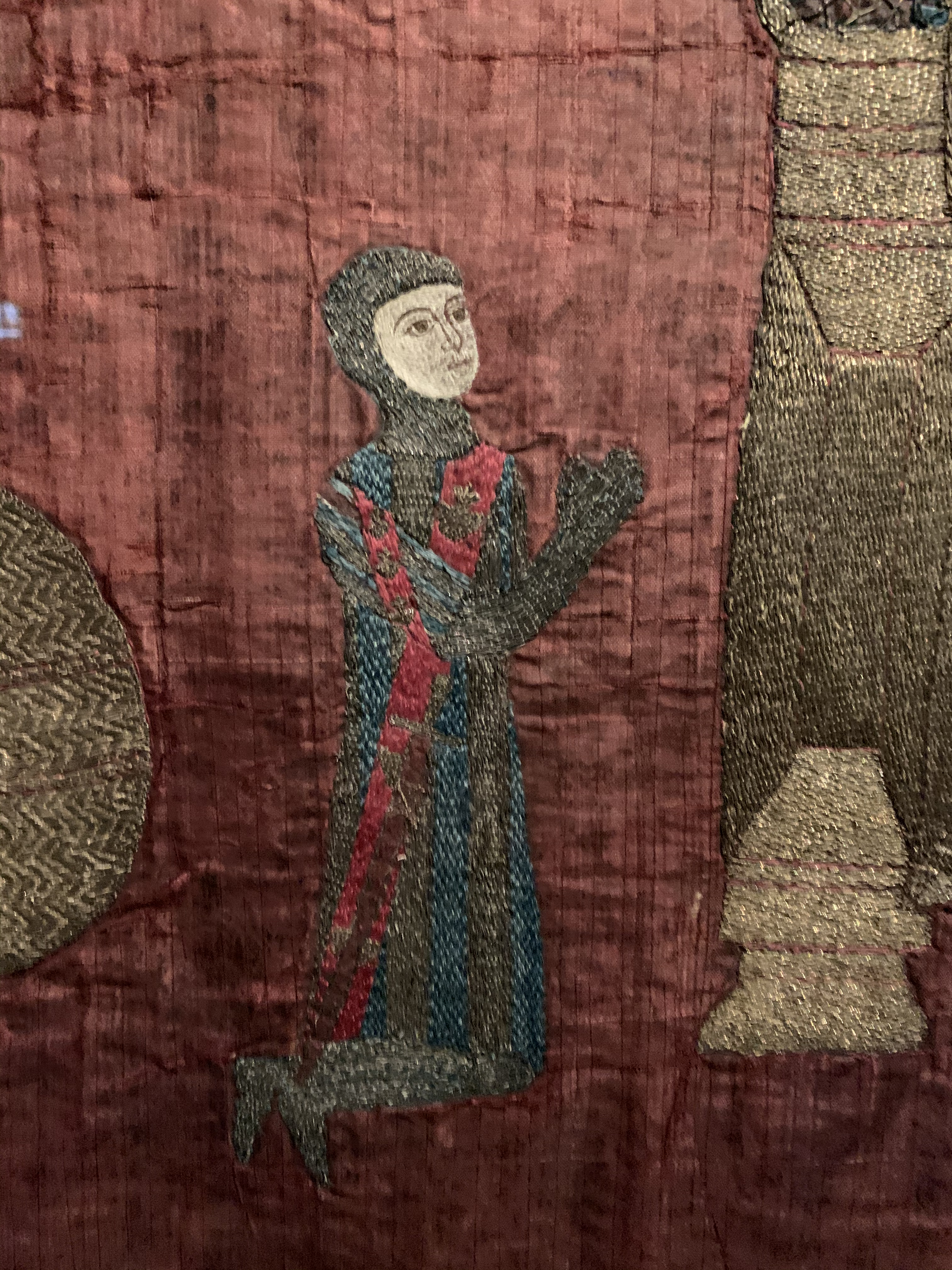
Othon de Grandson from an altar screen from the Cathedral in Lausanne now displayed in the Bern Historic Museum.

- William Grandison (c1250-died 1335) married Jeanne de Gruyère then Sybille Tregoz, their children include
  - Piers Grandison (died 1358)
  - John Grandison, Bishop of Exeter (died 1369).
  - Sir Otho Grandison (died 1359)
    - Thomas Grandison (died 1375).
  - Agnes Grandison, married John Northwood.
  - Mabel Grandison, married Sir John Pateshull.
  - Catherine Grandison, married William Montagu, 1st Earl of Salisbury.

The British royal family descends from William through two of his daughters. From Catherine de Grandson through the Montacute and Mortimer families and Richard, Earl of Cambridge, grandfather of Edward IV. From Mabel de Grandson through the Beauchamp and Beaufort families to Henry VII, founder of the Tudor dynasty.

== Abeyance ==
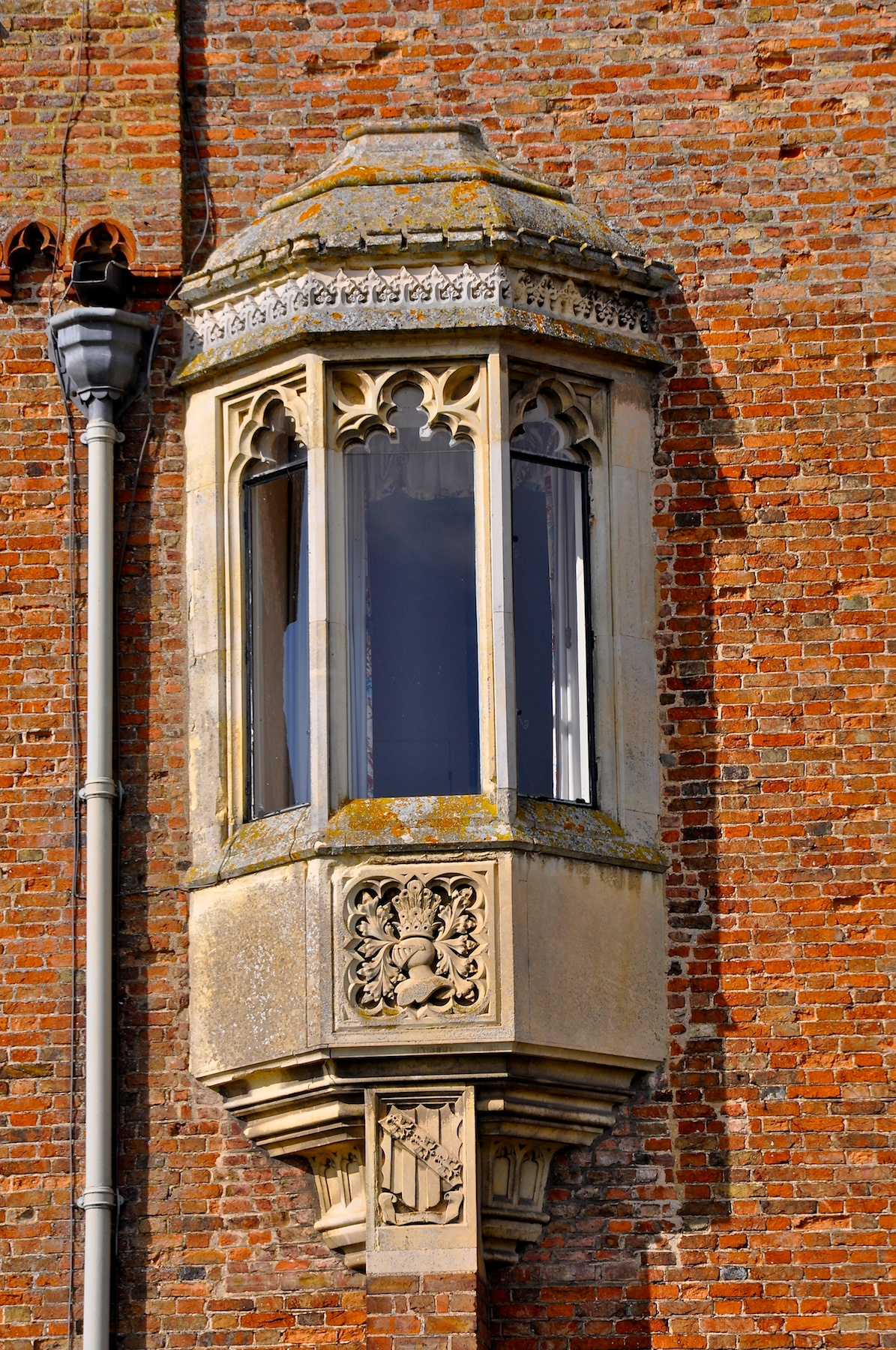
Arms of Grandison sculpted on an oriel window at Oxburgh Hall, Norfolk.

In 1858, after five centuries in abeyance, Sir Henry Paston-Bedingfeld, 6th Baronet of Oxburgh Hall (eldest son of Sir Richard Bedingfeld, 5th Baronet) was declared by the Committee of Privileges to be one of the co-heirs of the Barony of Grandison "through "the families of Paston, Tuddenham, Patteshull, and Grandison, heir to Dame Katherine Tuddenham, in whom one-fourth of a third of the representation of the Barony of Grandison had vested."

== See also ==
- Earl of Salisbury
- Paston-Bedingfeld baronets

== Bibliography ==
- Maddicott J. R. "Grandson, Sir Otto de (c.1238–1328)", Oxford Dictionary of National Biography. Oxford University Press, 2004 [online 2005]. Accessed 31 May 2015.
- Marshall, John (2025). Othon de Grandson: Edward I’s Loyal Knight of Renown. Barnsley: Pen and Sword Books. ISBN 9781399039628
- Marshall, John (2022). Welsh Castle Builders. Barnsley: Pen and Sword Books. ISBN 978-1-39908-549-6.
- Ray, Michael. 2006. The Savoyard Cousins: A Comparison of the Careers and Relative Success of the Grandson (Grandison) and Champvent (Chavent) Families in England. The Antiquaries Journal 86
