= Frederick Pickering =

Frederick Pickering may refer to:

- Frederick Augustus Pickering (1835–1926), president of the British Virgin Islands
- Frederick Brian Pickering (1927–2017), English metallurgist
- Fred Pickering (Frederick Pickering, 1941–2019), English footballer

== See also ==
- Fred Pickering (priest) (1919–2010), archdeacon of Hampstead
