= Otho Lewis Hancock =

British diplomat

Captain Otho Lewis Hancock OBE

Administrator of the British Virgin Islands
- In office 1923–1926

Personal details
- Born: 19 December 1893 Cornwall, England
- Died: 14 February 1942 (aged 48) at sea, near Singapore
- Occupation: Colonial administrator

Otho Lewis Hancock OBE (19 December 1893 – 14 February 1942) was a British soldier and colonial diplomat. He served as Administrator of the British Virgin Islands from 1923 to 1926.

He and his family were physically present in the original Government House (then known as Cameron Lodge) in Road Town, Tortola when it was physically destroyed by the "Gale of 1924", a catastrophic hurricane. Much of what we know about that hurricane's impact on the Territory come from contemporaneous written records and photographs by his wife, Agnes.

He was later appointed as Governor of Singapore prison.

Captain Hancock and his wife were both killed at sea on 14 February 1942 off the coast of Singapore, together with their son (also named Otho, an officer in the RAF). Records indicated that on the last day of fighting before fall of Singapore they were on the vessel, the S.S. Kuala at dock in Pom Pong Island whilst evacuating from Singapore, when it was bombed. Some reports suggest that Hancock left the ship by the gangway but then later returned to try and fight the blaze, and was never seen again.

== See also ==
- List of colonial heads of the British Virgin Islands
