= Sir Henry Bedingfeld, 3rd Baronet =

English landowner and baronet

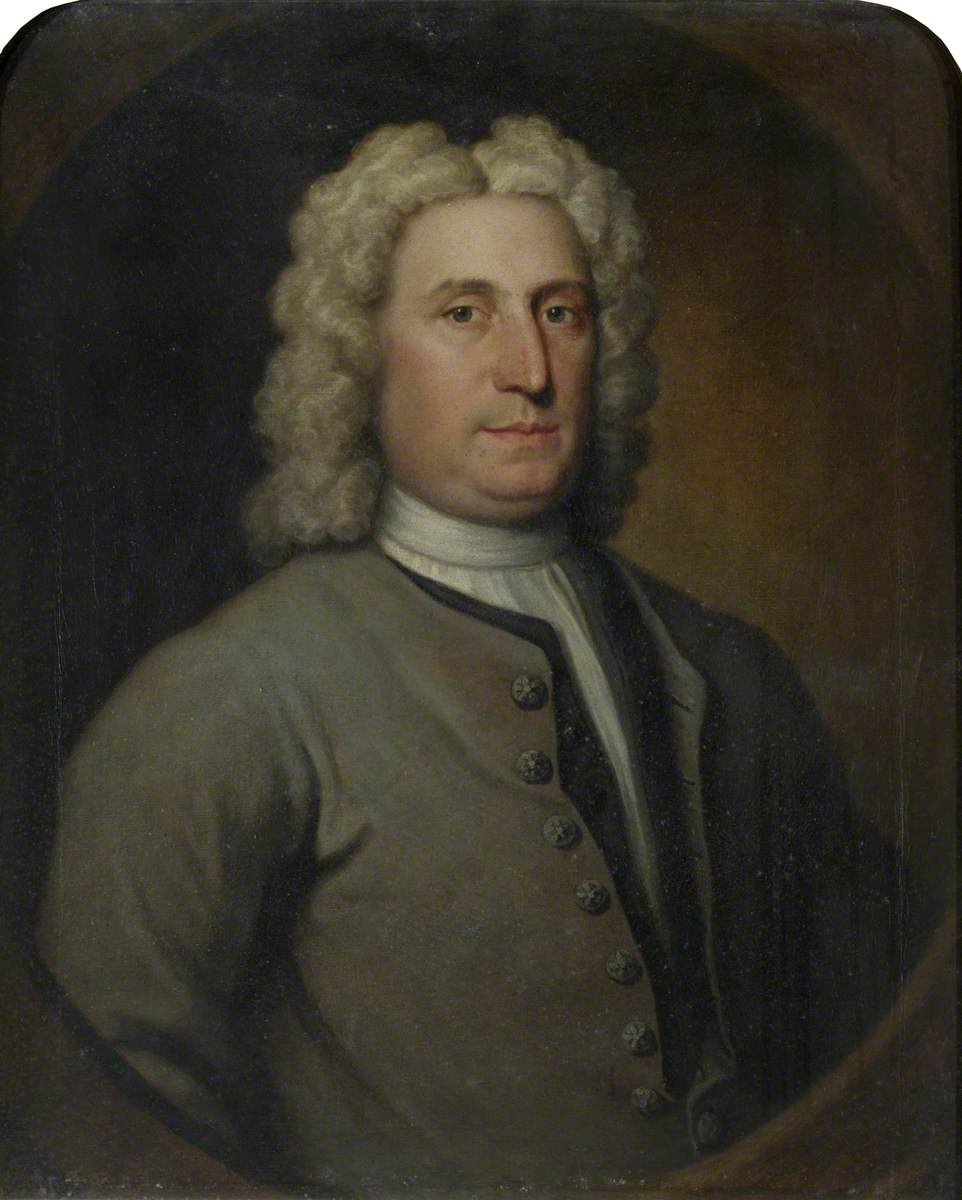
Portrait of Sir Henry Bedingfeld, Bart, in the style of John Theodore Heins, c. 1740

Sir Henry Arundell Bedingfeld, 3rd Baronet (c. 1689 – 15 July 1760), was an English landowner and baronet.

== Early life ==
He was the only surviving son of Elizabeth Arundell and Sir Henry Bedingfeld, 2nd Baronet of Oxburgh Hall, who accompanied Henry Stuart, Duke of Gloucester to England in 1660. His sisters were Margaret Bedingfeld (wife of Sir John Jerningham, 4th Baronet) and Frances Bedingfeld (wife of Sir Francis Anderton, 6th Baronet). His father had previously been married to Lady Anne Howard, a daughter of Charles Howard, 2nd Earl of Berkshire, but she died without issue.

His paternal grandparents were Margaret Paston (a daughter of Edward Paston of Appleton, Norfolk) and Sir Henry Bedingfeld, 1st Baronet, who had been created a baronet in 1661 as compensation for the family's unrecovered loss for supporting the Royalist cause during the English Civil War. Among his extended family was first cousin, Mary Bedingfield, who married Sir John Swinburne, 3rd Baronet of Capheaton, Northumberland (a son of Sir William Swinburne, 2nd Baronet). His maternal grandparents were Sir John Arundell of Lanherne, Cornwall and Hon. Elizabeth Roper (a daughter of the 3rd Baron Teynham).

== Career ==
Upon the death of his father on 14 September 1704, he succeeded as the 3rd Baronet Bedingfeld, of Oxburgh.

== Personal life ==
On 28 August 1719, Sir Henry married Lady Elizabeth Boyle (c. 1691–1751), eldest daughter of Charles Boyle, 3rd Earl of Cork (also known as the 2nd Earl of Burlington in the Peerage of England) and Juliana Noel (the only daughter and heiress of Hon. Henry Noel, himself the second son of the 3rd Viscount Campden). Together, they were the parents of:

- Elizabeth Bedingfeld, who married Charles Biddulph, son of John Biddulph and Mary Arundell.
- Sir Richard Henry Bedingfeld, 4th Baronet (1720–1795), who married Hon. Mary Browne, daughter of Anthony Browne, 6th Viscount Montagu, in 1761.
- Edward Bedingfeld (b. 1730), who married his second cousin, Mary Swinburne, second daughter of Sir John Swinburne, 3rd Baronet, and Mary Bedingfeld in 1754.

Lady Bedingfeld died in 1751. Sir Henry died on 15 July 1760 and was buried at Oxburgh. He was succeeded in the baronetcy by his son, Richard, and his last will, dated 17 June 1760, was proven (by probate) in 1760.

=== Descendants ===
Through his son Richard, he was a grandfather of Sir Richard Bedingfeld, 5th Baronet (1767–1829), who married Charlotte Georgiana Jerningham, daughter of Sir William Jerningham, 6th Baronet.

Baronetage of England
Preceded by Henry Bedingfeld	Baronet (of Oxburgh); 1704–1760	Succeeded by Richard Henry Bedingfeld
