= Henry Bedingfield =

Henry Bedingfield may refer to:

- Henry Bedingfield (died 1657) (1586–1657), Member of Parliament (MP) for Norfolk 1614
- Henry Bedingfield (judge) (1632–1687), MP and judge

== See also ==
- Henry Bedingfeld (disambiguation)
