= Matilda Bedingfeld =

British amateur artist (1828–1905)

Matilda Charlotte Paston-Bedingfeld (1828 – Hitchin, 31 December 1905) was a younger daughter of Sir Henry Bedingfeld, 6th Baronet of Oxburgh and Margaret Anne Paston. She is known for painting a series of watercolours of Oxburgh Hall around 1852.

She married Captain George Henry Nevill, a son of Charles Nevill from Nevill Holt, on 2 July 1855. George and Matilda met when George was recovering from wounds sustained during the Second Anglo-Sikh War (1848–1849). George also fought during the Crimean War. Matilda and George travelled from Norfolk to Paris and from thence to Italy during their honeymoon.

Not long after their honeymoon George began to suffer from delusions. He threatened to throw people down the stairs and regularly carried loaded firearms. In 1865 he was confined to the mental asylum in Stafford. Matilda and her husband lived separated from each other. Matilda died in 1905 in a terraced house in Hitchin, Herefordshire. Matilda and George had two children.

== Views and Interiors of Oxburgh Hall ==
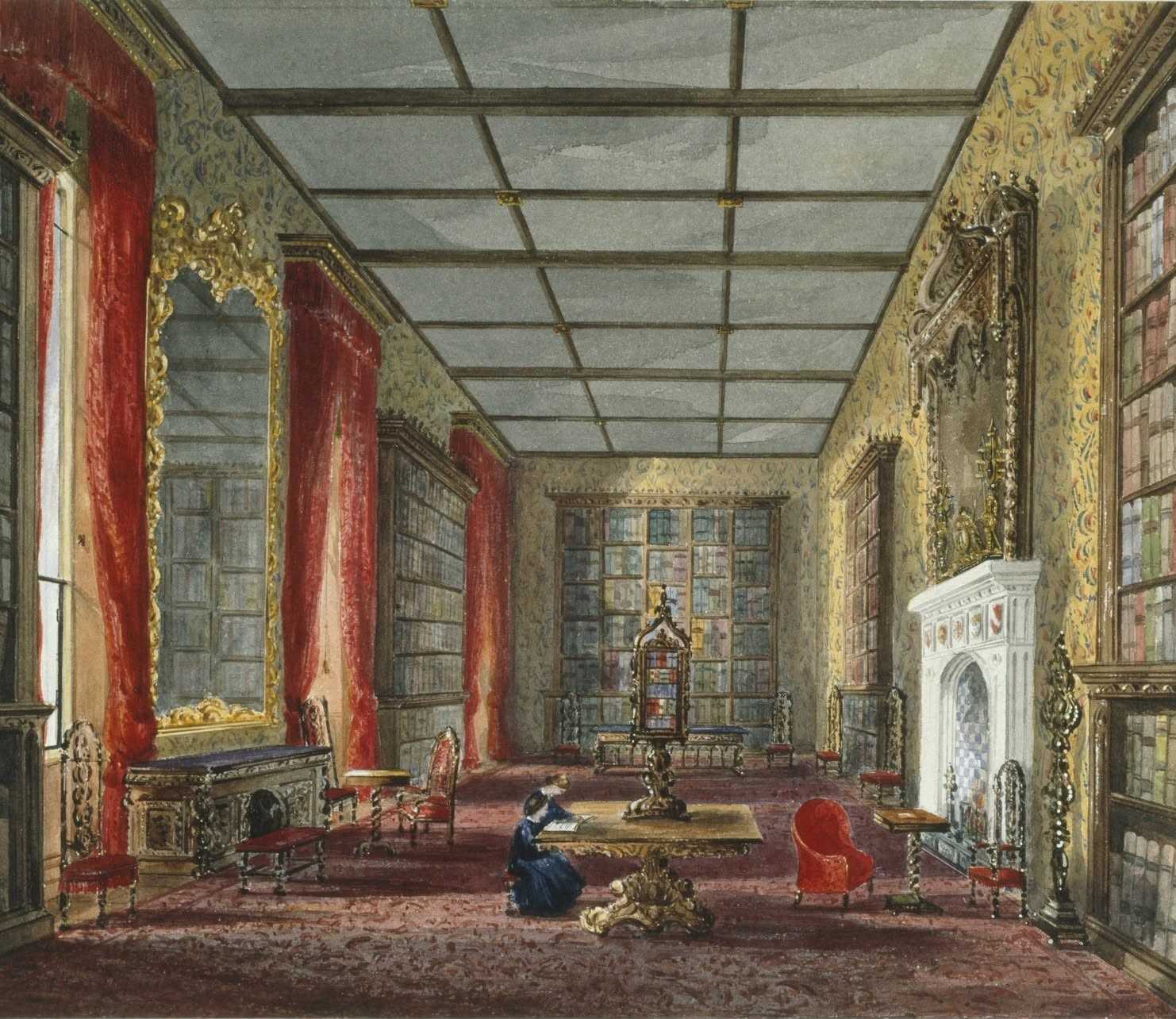
The Library, by Matilda Bedingfeld

Around 1850 Matilda painted a series of at least twenty-two watercolours of Oxburgh Hall, most of which featured the different rooms of the house. The series is kept in a leatherbound volume titled Views and Interiors of Oxburgh Hall painted by Matilda Bedingfeld and is part of the private collection of the Bedingfeld family.

The images are painted with a lot of attention to detail and are an important source of information on the history of Oxburgh Hall in the Victorian era, when Matilda's father had remodelled the house following the style of Gothic Revival.

Matilda's painting of the dining room was featured by the Royal Academy alongside other works by amateur painters and was briefly mentioned in The Art Journal.
