= Paston-Bedingfeld baronets =

Title in the Baronetage of England

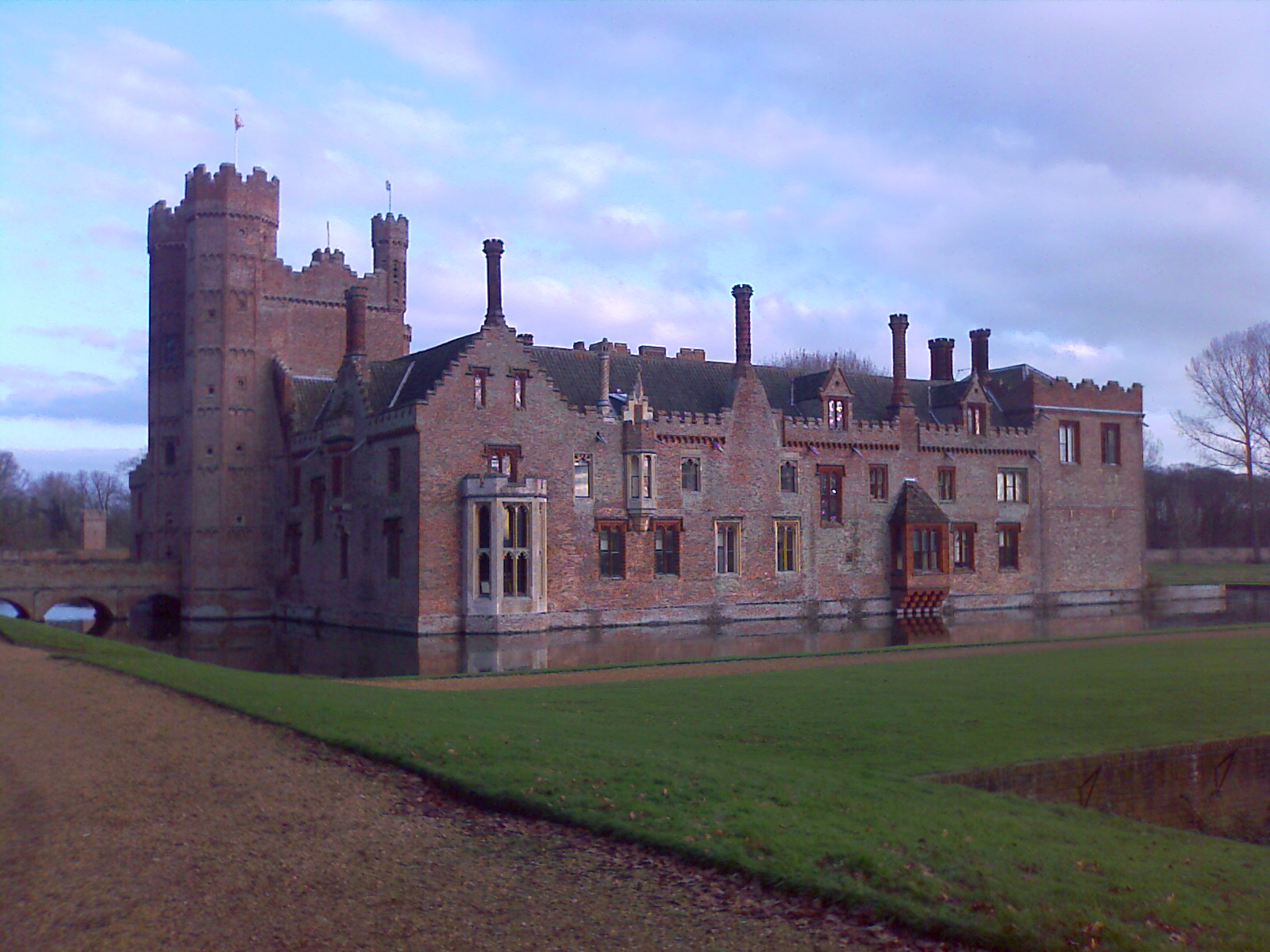
Oxburgh Hall

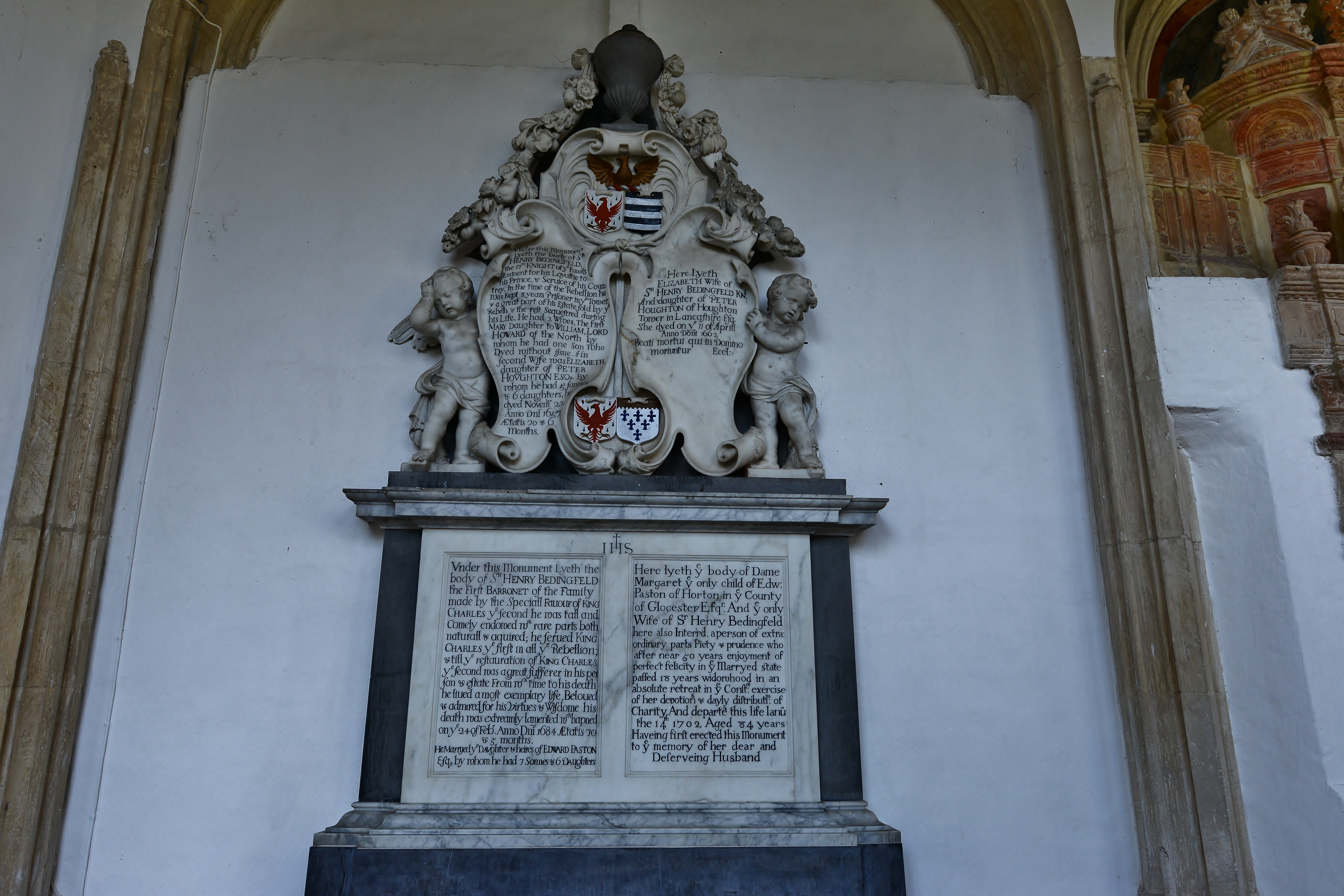
Monument in the Bedingfield Chapel of the Church of St John the Evangelist, Oxborough, to Sir Henry Bedingfield (1587-1657), Knight, and to Sir Henry Bedingfeld, 1st Baronet (1614–1685)

The Bedingfeld, later Paston-Bedingfeld Baronetcy, of Oxburgh in the County of Norfolk, is a title in the Baronetage of England. It was created by Charles II of England in recompense for the family's losses in the Royalist cause during the Civil War and Interregnum years.

The sixth Baronet married Margaret Anne, daughter and heiress of Edward Paston. In 1830 he assumed by Royal licence the additional surname of Paston.

The family seat is Oxburgh Hall, King's Lynn, Norfolk, now owned by the National Trust.

== Bedingfeld, later Paston-Bedingfeld baronets, of Oxburgh (1660) ==
Quarterly Bedingfeld & Paston

- Sir Henry Bedingfeld, 1st Baronet (1614–1685)
- Sir Henry Bedingfeld, 2nd Baronet (1636–1704)
- Sir Henry Bedingfeld, 3rd Baronet (died 1760)
- Sir Richard Henry Bedingfeld, 4th Baronet (1720–1795)
- Sir Richard Bedingfeld, 5th Baronet (1767–1829)
- Sir Henry Richard Paston-Bedingfeld, 6th Baronet (1800–1862)
- Sir Henry George Paston-Bedingfeld, 7th Baronet (1830–1902)
- Sir Henry Edward Paston-Bedingfeld, 8th Baronet (1860–1941), Major in the 3rd Battalion of the Liverpool Regiment.
- Sir Edmund George Felix Paston-Bedingfeld, 9th Baronet (1915–2011)
- Sir Henry Edgar Paston-Bedingfeld, 10th Baronet (born 1943), Rouge Croix Pursuivant of Arms from 1983 to 1993, York Herald of Arms from 1993 to 2010.

The heir apparent is the current holder's elder son Richard Paston-Bedingfeld (born 1975). The present Baronet is a co-heir to the barony of Grandison which has been in abeyance since 1375.

== See also ==
- Matilda Charlotte Paston-Bedingfeld (1828 – Hitchin, 31 December 1905), amateur painter
