= Henry Petre (colonist) =

Henry William Petre (1820 – 3 December 1889) was colonial treasurer of New Munster Province. He was a member of the New Zealand Legislative Council from 31 December 1853 to 6 November 1860, when he was disqualified for absence.

He was one of the founders of Wellington, arriving in 1840 on the Oriental. The Petre family was one of the first and most prominent colonial families of New Zealand; giving their name to Petre Bay, Chatham Island, and originally the town of Wanganui, north of Wellington. In 1841, Petre published an account of his time in Port Nicholson and Wellington. Petre returned to England to find a wife 13 months after arriving. His father sent for Mary Ann Eleanor Walmsley, then 15 years old and brought up in a convent, and the wedding happened in 1842. Mary Ann Petre's diary also survives.

Petre lived in the Hutt Valley, and with Vavasour and Charles Clifford established a sheep station in the Wairarapa.

Governor Sir George Grey appointed Petre to be Postmaster-General on 13 August 1853, but his appointment was not accepted by the First Parliament that met in 1854, and he left for England early in the new year.

He returned with his family to England in April 1855. His first wife died in 1885, and he remarried to the widow Sara Tolme. He died in Essex in 1889.

He seems to have been a man of strange appearance, from the description by his contemporary, the New Zealand social commentator Charlotte Godley: "He is immensely tall and thin and looks like a set of fire irons badly hung together".

His father William Petre, 11th Baron Petre, was chairman of the New Zealand Company. The Petres were an aristocratic family from Ingatestone in Essex, England, and the Wellington suburb of Thorndon was named after their Thorndon Hall estate in England. The family were recusant Roman Catholics.

The architect Francis Petre was his son.
