= Thomas Price (colonial administrator) =

President of the British Virgin Islands

Thomas Price was twice President of the British Virgin Islands, Acting President from 1857 to 1858, and then President from 1859 to 1861, and then Lieutenant-Governor of Dominica from 1861 to 1864. In 1862, Price dissolved the Dominican legislature and called a new election over a controversy from a bill pressing for a proper registration of voters' qualifications.

He was the son of Sir Rose Price, 1st Baronet of Trengwainton, Cornwall.

He had a wife, Anna, who died on the Island of Tortola in 1857, at the age of 39.
