= Oxborough =

Village in Norfolk, England

Coordinates: 52.5814°N 0.5708°E

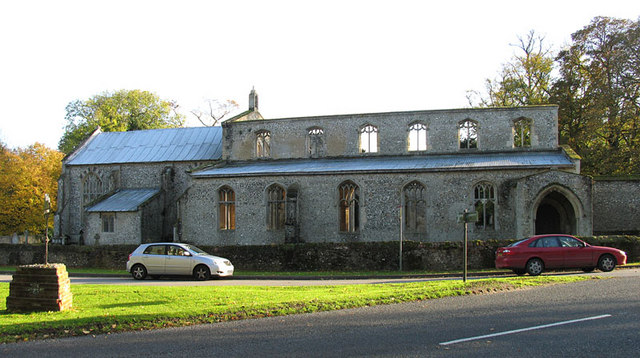
- St John's Church, showing its ruined nave at right

- Location within Norfolk
- Area: 13.24 km^{2} (5.11 sq mi)
- Population: 228 (2011)
  - Density: 17/km^{2} (44/sq mi)
- OS grid reference: TF742012
- Civil parish: Oxborough
- District: Breckland
- Shire county: Norfolk
- Region: East
- Country: England
- Sovereign state: United Kingdom
- Post town: KING'S LYNN
- Postcode district: PE33
- Dialling code: 01366
- Police: Norfolk
- Fire: Norfolk
- Ambulance: East of England

Oxborough is a village and civil parish in the English county of Norfolk, well known for its church and manor house Oxburgh Hall. It covers an area of 13.024 km^{2} (5.029 sq mi) and had a population of 240 in 106 households in the 2001 census, reducing to a population of 228 in 111 households at the 2011 Census. For the purposes of local government, it falls within the district of Breckland.

The villages name means 'Ox fortification’.

The Oxborough dirk, a Bronze Age ceremonial oversize dagger was discovered nearby in 1988. It was acquired for the nation and is now on display in the British Museum.

Oxburgh Hall, the ancient ancestral home of the Bedingfeld family, is now owned by the National Trust.

== Churches ==
St John's Church, in the centre of the village, is partially ruined. Its Bedingfeld Chapel of 1496 contains two rare terracotta tombs, unique in England, which commemorate members of the Bedingfeld family of Oxburgh Hall. In 1948, the tower and spire of the church collapsed onto the church below in high winds, destroying the south side of the nave. The surviving chancel and Bedingfeld chapel were subsequently repaired to become the main church buildings, leaving the destroyed nave as a grassed area.

At the Reformation, the Bedingfeld family retained their Roman Catholic faith as recusants; the Hall contains a priest hole. Following the Catholic emancipation, a new Roman Catholic chapel dedicated to St Margaret and Our Lady, was built in the grounds of Oxburgh Hall. It contains a large triptych altarpiece constructed of 16th-century panels from Antwerp.

Remains of an earlier Norman church, St. Mary Magdalene, also survive within the grounds of the Old Rectory at Oxborough Hythe, a hamlet south west of the main village.

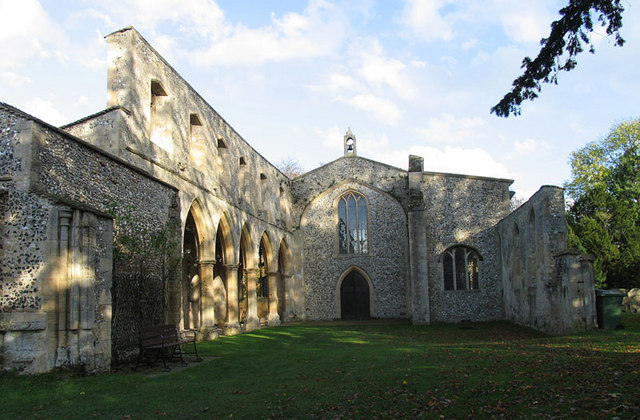
The ruined nave

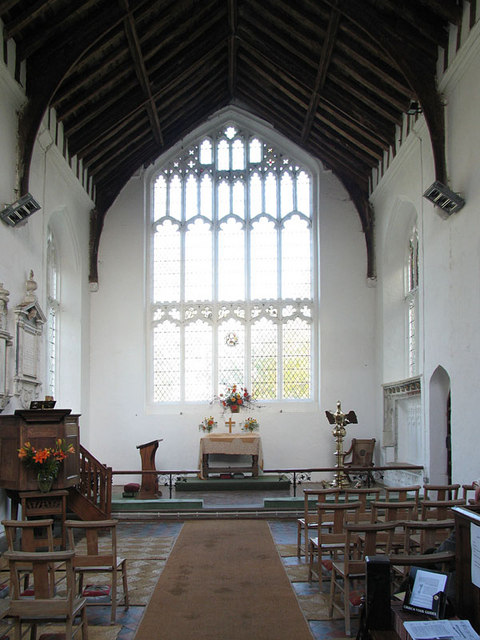
The east end

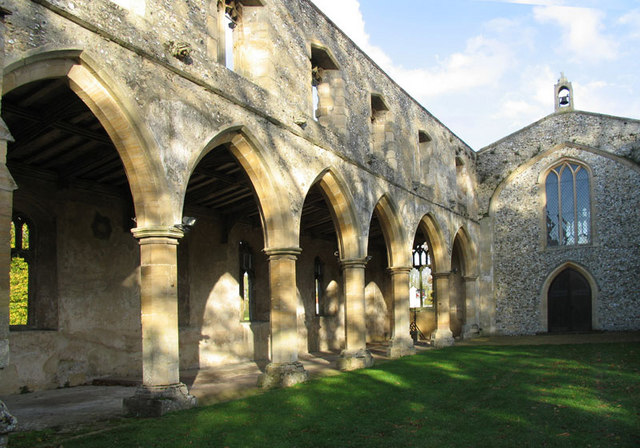
The north wall

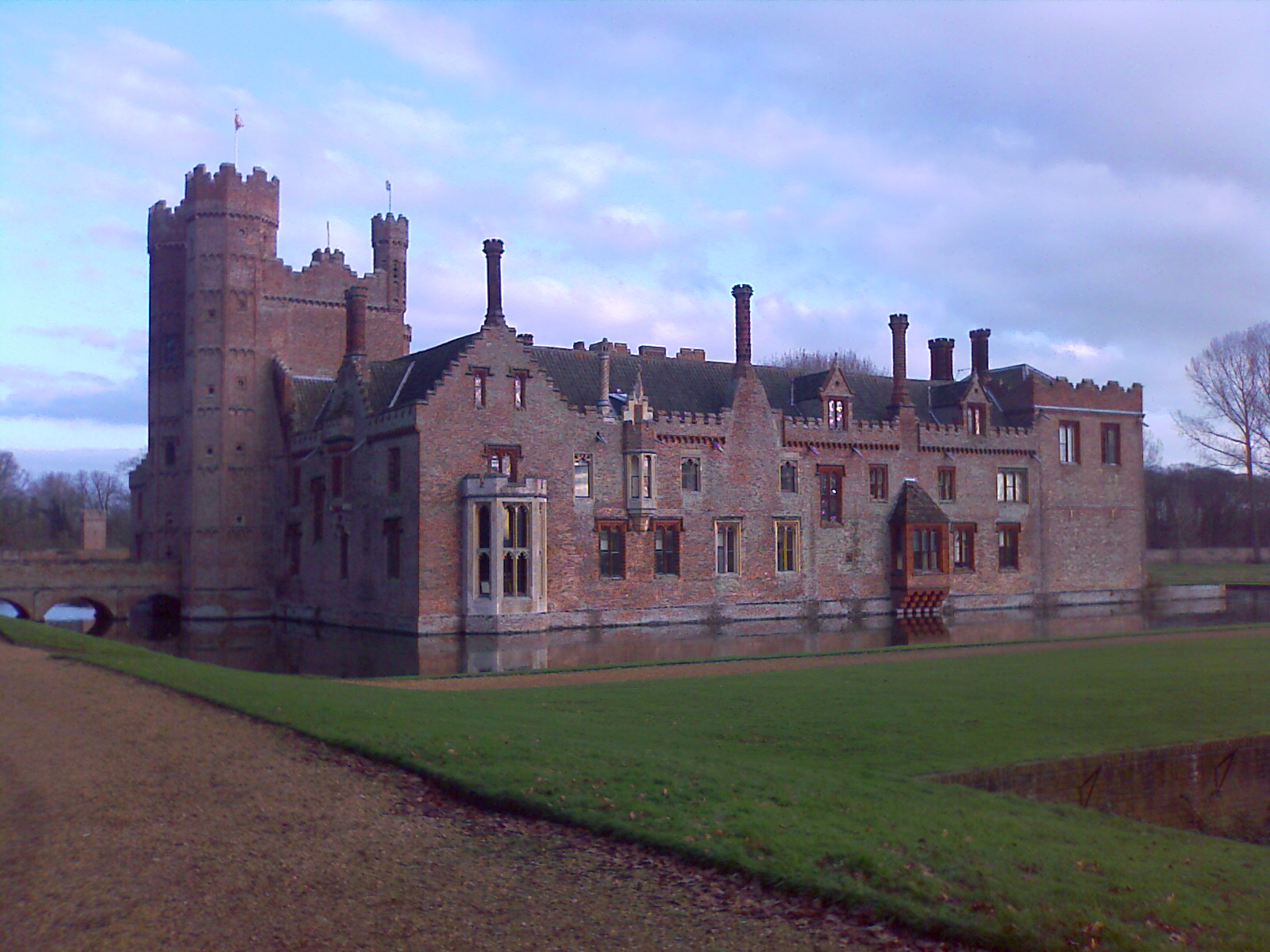
Oxburgh Hall

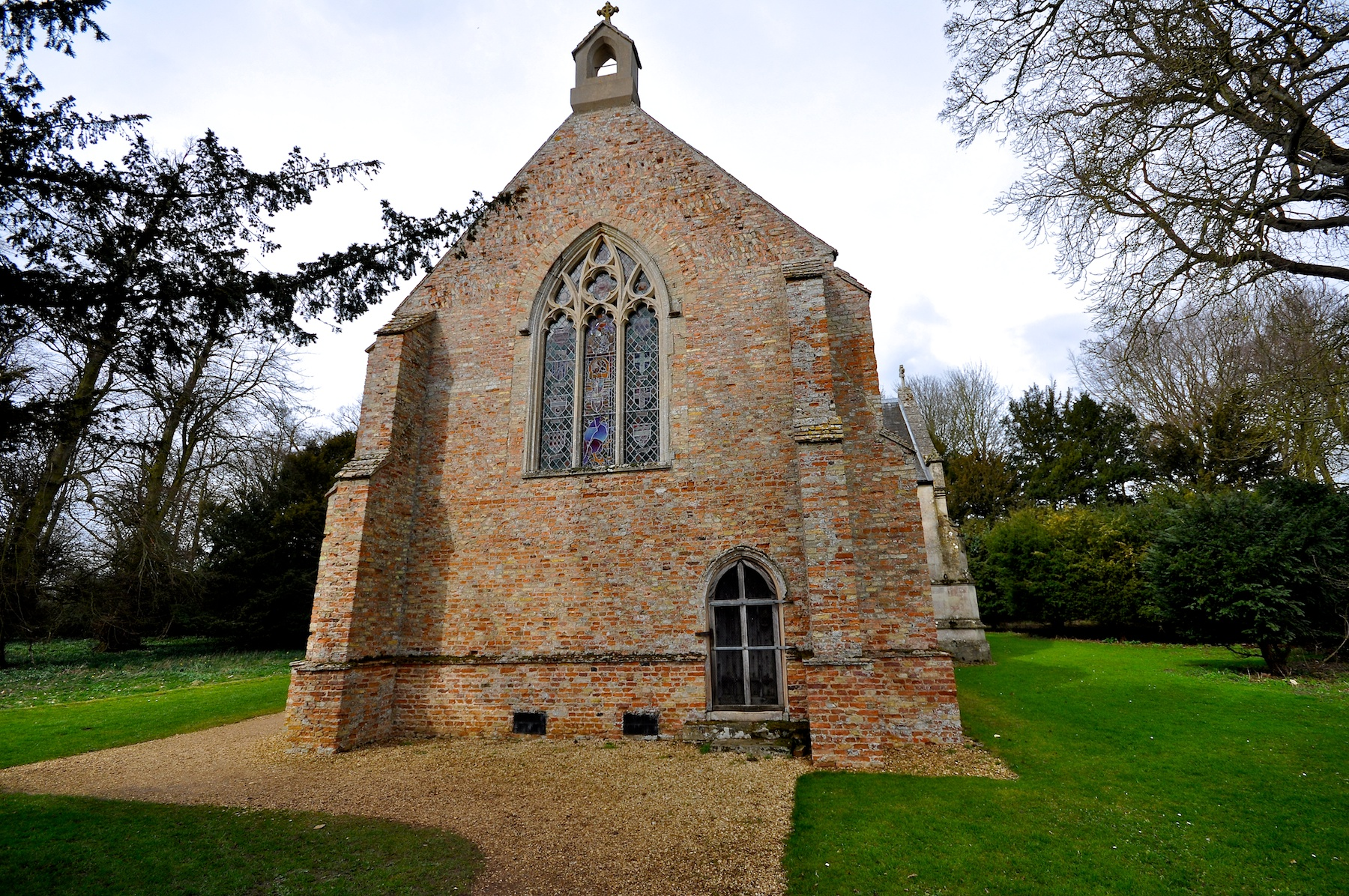
Roman Catholic chapel of St Margaret and Our Lady

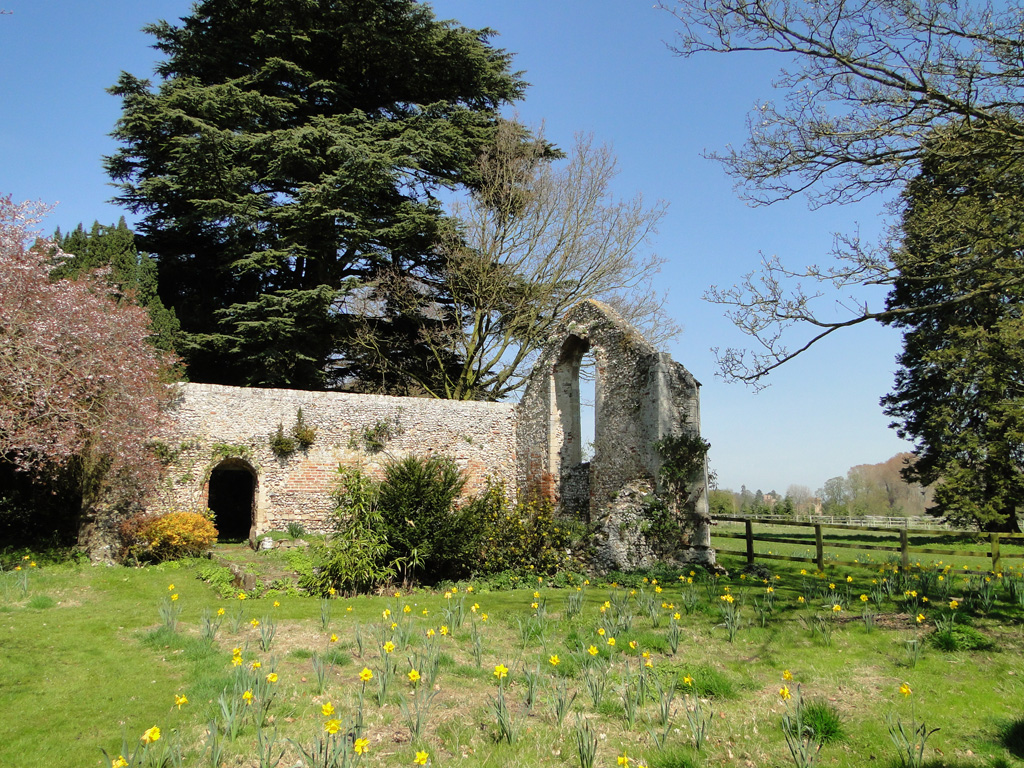
Ruin of the church of St Mary Magdalene, Oxborough Hythe
