= William Petre, 11th Baron Petre =

English landowner and philanthropist

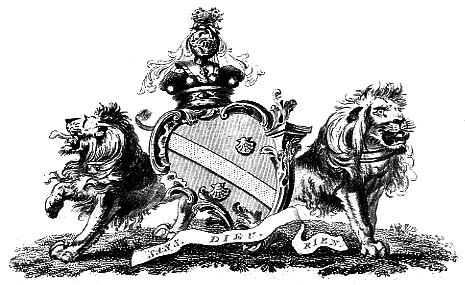
Arms of the Barons Petre: Gules a bend or between two escallops argent

William Henry Francis, 11th Baron Petre (22 January 1793 – 3 July 1850) was an English landowner and philanthropist. He was the first Baron Petre to take his seat in the House of Lords after the passing of the Roman Catholic Relief Act 1829.

== Family ==
He was a son of Robert Edward Petre, 10th Baron Petre of Ingatestone Hall and Mary Bridget Howard. His mother was a sister of Bernard Howard, 12th Duke of Norfolk.

== Horseman and hunter ==
Petre was a passionate horseman and maintained, and was master of, his own pack of foxhounds (1822–1839) known as the "Thorndon Hunt", from which the Essex Union Hunt subsequently developed. He also constructed a racecourse at Oxney Green, near Writtle. It is said that following the Battle of Waterloo, Petre acquired Marengo, the grey Arabian horse of Napoleon I of France

Keen on hunting he also created, at Thorndon Park, a mixed herd of up to 2,000 fallow deer and red deer which subsequently formed the basis not only of the present Brentwood, Essex herd but also the entire deer population of New Zealand.

== Marriage and children ==
On 2 June 1815, Petre married his first wife Frances Charlotte Bedingfeld (19 April 1796 – 29 January 1822 Thorndon Hall), daughter of Sir Richard Bedingfeld, 5th Baronet and his wife Charlotte Georgiana Jerningham. Her maternal grandparents were Sir William Jerningham, 6th Baronet and Frances Dillon. The senior Frances was a daughter of Henry Dillon, 11th Viscount Dillon and Lady Charlotte Lee. The senior Charlotte was a daughter of George Lee, 2nd Earl of Lichfield and Frances Hales. The eldest Frances was a daughter of Sir John Hales, 4th Baronet.

Frances, nicknamed "Fanny", became a letter writer of brilliant vividness. They had four children. Frances died in childbirth.

- William Bernard Petre, 12th Baron Petre (1817–1884).
- Hon. Mary Agness Petre (1818–1886), who married James Alexander Douglas.
- Hon. Henry William Petre (1820–1889), a member of the New Zealand Legislative Council and father of Francis Petre.
- Hon. Charlotte Elizabeth Petre (1822–1903), who married her first cousin, Capt. Charles Edward Petre, a son of Hon. Charles Berney Petre (a younger brother of the 11th Baron).

On 14 April 1823, Petre married his second wife Emma Agnes Howard (5 November 1803 – 10 February 1861 London). She was a daughter of Henry Howard of Corby Castle and his second wife Catherine Mary Neave. Her paternal grandparents were Philip Howard and Ann Witham. Philip was a son of Thomas Howard and Barbara Musgrave. Thomas was a son of William Howard and Jane Dalston. William was a son of Sir Francis Howard and Margeret Preston.

Sir Francis was a son of Lord William Howard and Elizabeth Dacre. His paternal grandparents were Thomas Howard, 4th Duke of Norfolk and his second wife Margaret Audley. His maternal grandparents were Thomas Dacre, 4th Baron Dacre and Elizabeth Leyburne.

Petre and Emma had eight children, including;

- Hon. Frederick Charles Edmund Petre (1824–1906), who married Georgiana Musgrave, daughter of Rev. Sir Christopher Musgrave, 9th Baronet, in 1847
- Hon. Agnes Catherine Louisa Petre (1826–1891), who married Charles Clifford, 8th Baron Clifford of Chudleigh.
- Hon. Arthur Charles Augustus Petre (1827–1882), who married Lady Katherine Howard, a daughter of William Howard, 4th Earl of Wicklow.
- Hon. Edmund George Petre (1829–1889), father of Francis Loraine Petre, the military historian.
- Hon. Albert Henry Petre (1832–1917), who married Katherine Elsie Clark, a daughter of William Robinson Clark.

== Ginge Petre Charity ==
=== Restoration ===
On 29 September 1832, George Edward Last arrived at Ingatestone Hall in a post-chaise from St. Edmund's College, Ware to replace John Law, who had contracted cholera whilst visiting London earlier in the month. He took charge of the Ingatestone Mission, at that time one of seven in Essex, and one of his initial concerns was to restore the Ginge Petre Charity to its original Roman Catholic purpose.

Last achieved this in 1835, just six years after Catholic Emancipation, and was supported by William. A stern but benevolent figure, Lord Petre devoted much of his time to the welfare of his tenants in Essex, and was a generous benefactor of the Church in the county. With his encouragement, Last recovered the administration and became the priest-treasurer and governor of the restored charity. E. E. Wilde recalled his efforts in her Ingatestone and the Great Essex Road (1913):

"Canon Last, a young, vigorous and popular man, … with the support of Lord Petre, … asserted the right of the Roman Catholics to enjoy the benefit of the Ginge Petre Charity, of which they had been deprived for so many years".

=== Relocation ===
During the 1830s, whilst Last was working for the restoration of the charity, the construction of the railway began. As the railway neared Ingatestone, in 1838, the charity ground in Stock Lane was endangered. The railway company would require part of the property for the excavation of a cutting and some of the buildings would have to be pulled down.

A new site for the newly restored charity almshouses was thus required. The buildings in Stock Lane were sold to the railway company, although two cottages remain to this day next to the railway bridge in Stock Lane. Land was acquired adjoining the High Road in the village for new almshouses, and Lord Petre and Last also proposed to build a new public church nearby. However, because Last was engaged in raising funds for the new church at Brentwood, Essex, the Ingatestone church did not materialise until a century later.

The new almshouses in the village were built along three sides of a square, with a small chapel in the centre, facing the road. Twelve single-storey dwellings were constructed in Tudorbethan style of red and white brick, each with a living room, bedroom and scullery.

=== Administration ===
New sets of rules, founded upon the original ones of Sir William Petre, were drawn up. The 11th Lord Petre sealed them on 2 November 1840, witnessed by George Shaw and Joseph Coverdale, Lord Petre's land agent and the coroner for the district of Writtle, resident at Ingatestone Hall.

There were to be two male and five female residents provided for out of the restored charity, each in receipt of a small pension. In addition, there were to be two female and one male supernumeraries. However, the male pensioners were to lose their Freeholder status. The ten pensions from the Ginge Petre endowment were subsequently supplemented by a further two from the Thorndon estate, drawn from a sum bequeathed for that purpose by Lady Emma Petre (1803–1861), the second wife of the 11th Baron. Another endowment, £50 from Miss Hannah Raynor (died 1806) was paid from Thorndon too.

Lord Petre financed his own contribution to the reconstruction and maintenance of the restored almshouses from private sources and from the sum received in compensation from the railway company. The latter body also contributed £965 towards the new almshouses, with £360 of the principal compensatory sum added thereto.

The Ginge Petre Charity was registered with the Charity Commission as a body corporate, comprising Lord Petre, the Priest-Treasurer and Governor (viz. Last) and the seven statutory pensioners. The beneficiaries of the charity were to be baptised and practising Catholics. Lord Petre was to appoint the pensioners himself, on the recommendation of the Priest-Governor. Preference was given to applicants residing in parishes upon the Petre estates, if suitable. They were to be either unmarried or widowed, above the age of 40, and content to live chaste lives. Pensioners were liable to dismissal for bad behaviour. Moreover, religious observance was required: the pensioners were to attend all the services held in their own chapel.

Last’s notebooks from the 1850s and 1860s indicate that he celebrated Mass there once each week. The pensioners (or "inmates" as they were often referred to) were also required to say their prayers upon rising and retiring, and to care for each other when sick –a duty that a future incumbent of Ingatestone, Roderick Grant (1860–1934), feared was "sometimes more honoured in the breach than the observance".

The pensioners were forbidden visitors overnight except in the case of illness. The able-bodied pensioners were to recite prayers after each Mass for the repose of the soul of deceased benefactors. The priest-treasurer and governor, in addition to being expected to celebrate Mass in the Alms Row chapel at least once monthly, was also required to supervise the keeping of the charity rules by the pensioners. He was also to pay the latter their monthly allowance of 5s (later raised to the original sum of 6s 8d), their annual wood allowance of 24s, and a sum of 12s for their livery. Last's account books are now kept amongst the Petre archives in the Essex Record Office. They provide a detailed insight into the administration of the charity.

Together with the appointed pensioners, the governor was to be the absolute owner of the charity land and property, with Lord Petre as patron, reserving to himself and his heirs the right to make new rules for the government of the foundation, or to alter or amend existing regulations. For administrative purposes, there was also to be an annual meeting of the charity, which all the pensioners were to attend. At this meeting leases were to be taken out or renewed, the rules were to be read, and the accounts were to be produced for examination, endorsement and sealing.

== Railways ==
It was during William's lifetime that the railways developed and he proved a stubborn negotiator in his dealings with the Eastern Counties Railway over the Brentwood to Chelmsford stretch of line. During the 1830s, plans were drawn up for the construction of a railway line eastwards from London through Essex. The new railway proposals required Parliamentary approval, but encountered strong objections, and claims for compensation, from Lord Petre, a major landowner along the projected route.

In the House of Lords, he resisted the Act of Parliament the Company needed to precede until they agreed to pay him six times the compensation originally offered. Lord Petre feared that the railway would divide his estates, passing as it would through Ingatestone itself. He suggested that the line should pass further northwards, nearer to Writtle. He also expressed concern with regard to the effects of the inevitable influx of railway navvies: the latter, many of them from Ireland, had a fearsome reputation, and Essex, as yet, without a modern police force. A legal dispute ensued, but Lord Petre eventually withdrew his opposition to the planned route. Royal Assent was granted to the Eastern Counties Railway Company's bill.

However, a fresh dispute began as Lord Petre protested at the inadequate sum awarded to him as compensation for the loss of agricultural land. Construction workers were ordered from his estates. Lord Petre sought a sum of £20,000 for the land required by the railway company, and a payment of a further £100,000 in compensation. The Eastern Counties Railway Company protested at the latter claim, insisting that a panel of surveyors had considered £20,000 a fair total (over £1 million today). The dispute persisted, but after a period of deadlock, Lord Petre won his case and the railway company paid him six times the compensation originally offered. The money was invested in an agricultural estate in the Dengie Peninsula but with the onset of the agricultural depression of the 1880s, the investment proved disastrous.

The construction from London eastwards began in 1838, but it became apparent the Charity ground in Stock Lane was endangered, as the railway company would require part of the property for the excavation of a cutting. Some of the buildings would have to be pulled down, the original almshouses were then moved and it was here that the first station at Ingatestone was situated, approached from the road by a flight of steps. The Brentwood to Chelmsford section of the railway was completed by 1841. The line eventually reached Colchester in 1843.

== Colonization ==
William had 12 children and 56 grandchildren. His two eldest sons alone (William and Henry) had 29 children between them. He was a strong supporter of overseas colonisation – he was wont to say that, with so many children, he could not be otherwise. Frederick and three of his brothers went to the United States while their elder brother, Henry, joined the first expedition of settlers to New Zealand. Henry's son, Francis Petre, was a leading architect who designed the Roman Catholic Cathedral of the Blessed Sacrament (Christchurch, New Zealand).

Frederick Charles Edmund Petre (1824–1906) was William's 3rd son and Agnes Louisa Catherine Petre (1826–1891) who later became Lady Clifford was his third daughter. In addition, by his second wife, he had Edmund George Petre, (1829–1889). In 1845, Mary Agnes Petre (1816 – ) later married to Mr Douglas, took an inventory of the pictures at Thorndon Hall, the book is divided into a number of sections, each executed in a different style of illumination.

His tenth son, Edmund, was a stockbroker and the father of Francis Loraine Petre, an Indian Civil Servant. Upon retirement, F. Loraine Petre wrote several regimental histories, and five books on the Napoleonic Wars.

Peerage of England
Preceded by Robert Edward Petre	Baron Petre; 1809–1850	Succeeded by William Bernard Petre
