= Frederick Augustus Pickering =

President of the British Virgin Islands

Fredrick Augustus Pickering (1835–1926) was the first President of the British Virgin Islands of African descent. He was also the last President of the Territory; after he stepped down in 1887, no replacement was appointed. In 1889, the office was replaced with that of Commissioner. He served in the post from 1884 to 1887. Pickering had previously served as the President's clerk and was a popular local figure. In the 1880s, the dissolution of the Legislative Council was only prevented by the appointment of two popular local figures, Pickering and Joseph Romney to the council.

The appointment of Pickering occurred at a time of considerable decline in the history of the British Virgin Islands. Not long after Pickering stepped down, the Legislative Council itself was dissolved, and the legislative powers were transferred by the Colonial Office to the Federal Legislature of the Leeward Islands, in which the British Virgin Islands had no representation. The Commissioner had virtually no real power; executive authority was vested in the Governor of the Leeward Islands.

Government offices
Preceded by Richard Henry Kortright Dyett	President of the British Virgin Islands; 1884–1887	Succeeded by Office discontinued
