= List of presidents of the British Virgin Islands =

The following persons served as presidents of the Council in the British Virgin Islands. However, the real power in the territory was exercised through the governors of the Leeward Islands.

Prior to 1782 the relevant executive position was referred to as lieutenant governors, and was an appointment by the British Crown. In 1772 the first Executive Council was formed, and from 1782 onwards the relevant authority was exercised by the president of the council, until 1887 when appointments from Britain were reintroduced (this time styled as "Administrators").

- John Pickering (1741)
- John Hunt (1741–1750)
- James Purcell (1750–1751)
- John Purcell (1751–1775)
- John Nugent (1775–1782)

Vacant from 1782 to 1811

- Richard Hetherington (1811–18??)
- William Rogers Isaacs (1833–1838)
- Edward Hay Drummond Hay (1839–1850)

Vacant from 1850 to 1852

- John Cornell Chads (1852–1854)
- Cornelius Hendricksen Kortright (1854–1857)

Vacant from 1857 to 1859

- Thomas Price (1859–1861)
- James Robert Longden (1861–1864)
- Sir Arthur Carlos Henry Rumbold (1866–1869)
- Alexander Wilson Muir (1869–1872)
- Richard Mahoney Hickson (1873–1879)
- John Kemys Spencer-Churchill (1879–1882)
- Richard Henry Kortright Dyett (1882–1884)
- Fredrick Augustus Pickering (1884–1887)

For leaders after this see: Governor of the British Virgin Islands
