= John Cornell Chads =

President of the British Virgin Islands (1793–1854)

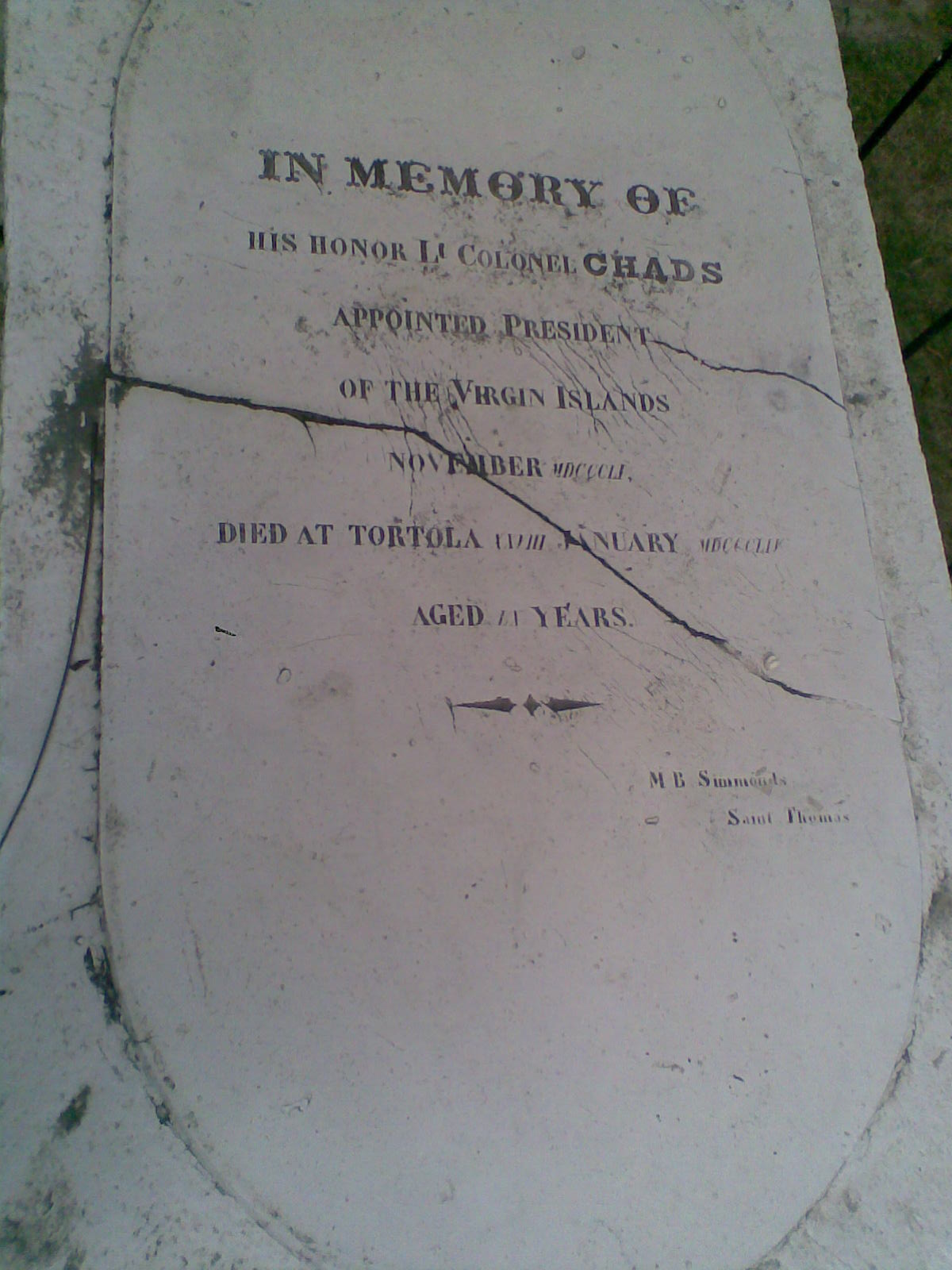
The gravestone of John Chads

Lieutenant-Colonel John Cornell Chads (9 August 1793 – 28 February 1854) was a Royal Marines officer who served as the President of the British Virgin Islands.

joined the Royal Marines and reached the rank of 2nd lieutenant on 4 May 1809, aged 16. He became a captain in the 1st West India Regiment on 27 January 1820. He became a major on 22 April 1836, still serving in the West India Regiment. He was promoted to the rank of lieutenant colonel on 3 March 1843 and then retired on full pay aged 50. He returned to England with his family and lived in Portsea, Hampshire, until his appointment as President of the British Virgin Islands in 1852. He died in Government House, Tortola, on 28 February 1854 with the rank of colonel.

- On 5 December 1816, he married Miss Elizabeth (Eliza) Stiles Parker in Tortola. John and Elizabeth Chads had eight children, two sons and six daughters.
- From 1852 until his death on 28 February 1854, he was the President of the British Virgin Islands

Chads was President of the British Virgin Islands during the great insurrection of 1853. On 1 August 1853, a large body of rural labourers came to Road Town to protest the imposition of a new cattle tax. The authorities immediately read the Riot Act, and made two arrests. Violence then erupted almost immediately. Several constables and magistrates were badly beaten, the greater part of Road Town itself was burned down, and a large number of the plantation houses were destroyed, cane fields were burnt and sugar mills destroyed. Almost all of the white population fled to St. Thomas. President John Chads was reported to have shown considerable personal courage, but little judgement or tact. On 2 August, he met a gathering of 1,500 to 2,000 protesters, but all he would promise to do was relay their grievances before the legislature (which could not meet, as all the other members had fled). One protester was shot (the only recorded death during the disturbances themselves), which led to the continuation of the rampage. By 3 August, the only white people remaining in the territory were John Chads himself, the Collector of Customs, a Methodist missionary and the island's doctor.

The riots were eventually suppressed with military assistance from nearby St. Thomas, but they marked the beginning of almost a complete exodus of the white population of the territory. The episode marked the beginning of the era sometimes referred to as "decline and disorder" in the history of the British Virgin Islands.

The gravestone of John Chads is in the churchyard of St George's, the main Episcopal church in Road Town.

== Political Summary ==
Government offices
| Preceded by Sir John Murray-Macgregor, Bt | President of the British Virgin Islands; 1852–1854 | Succeeded by Cornelius Hendricksen Kortright |
