= Oxburgh Hall =

Moated country house in Oxborough, England

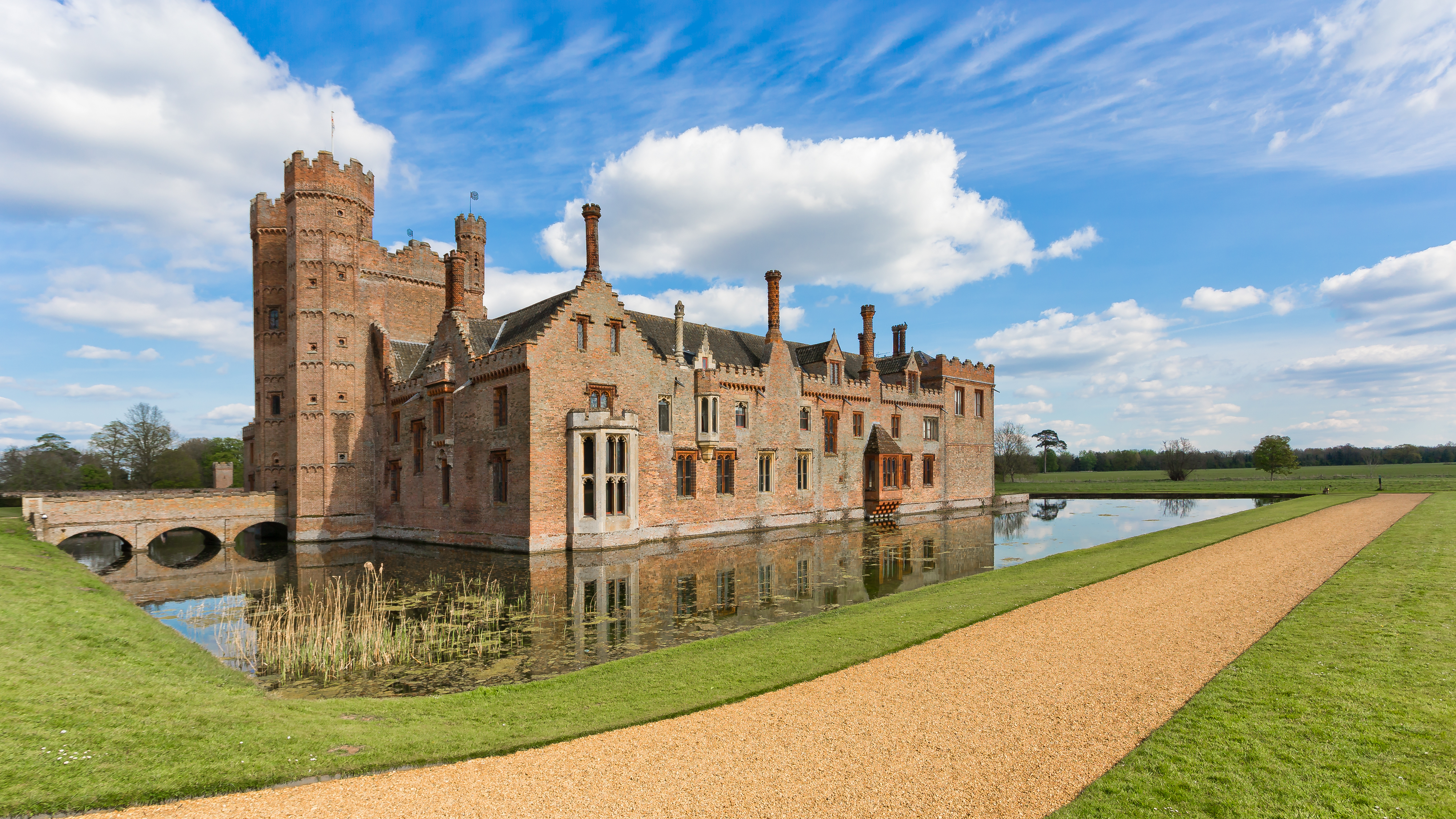
- Oxburgh Hall 2017
- Interactive map of the Oxburgh Hall area

General information
- Type: country house
- Architectural style: Tudor
- Location: In the village of Oxborough, 7 miles south west of Swaffham, Oxborough, England
- Coordinates: 52°34′52″N 0°34′13″E
- Completed: 1482
- Owner: National Trust

Technical details
- Material: brick, stone and slate

Oxburgh Hall is a moated country house in Oxborough, Norfolk, England. The hall was built for Sir Edmund Bedingfeld who obtained a licence to crenellate in 1482. The Bedingfelds gained the manor of Oxborough through marriage in the early 15th century, and the family has lived at the hall since its construction, although ownership passed to the National Trust in 1952. The house underwent extensive refurbishment in the mid 19th century under John Chessell Buckler and Augustus Pugin.

== History ==
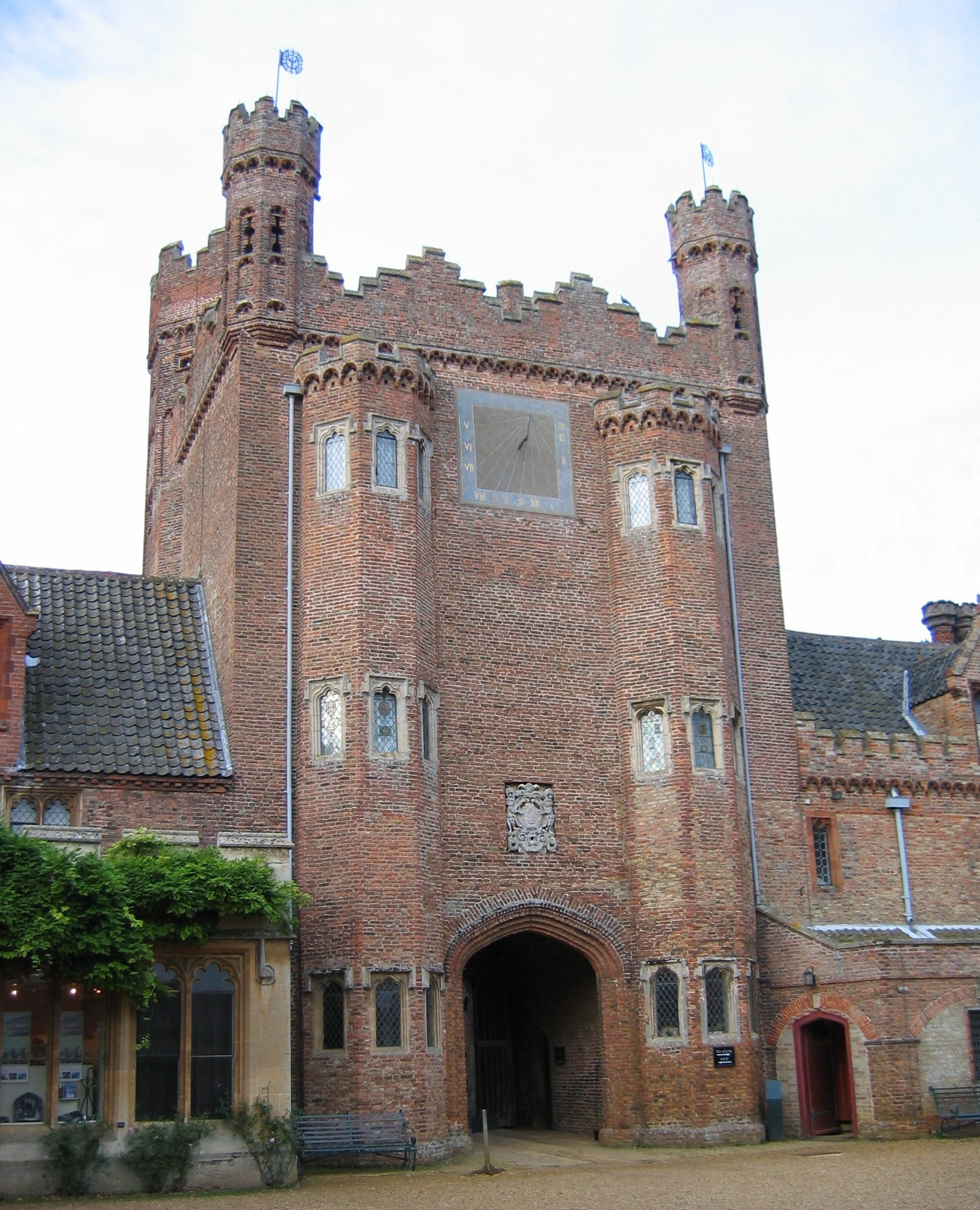
The courtyard front of the gatehouse, with paired polygonal stair towers

An example of a late medieval, inward-facing great house, Oxburgh stands within a square moat about 75 metres on each side, and was originally enclosed; the hall range facing the gatehouse was pulled down in 1772 for Sir Richard Bedingfeld, providing a more open U-shaped house, with the open end of the U facing south. The entrance, reached by a three-arched bridge on the north side, is through a fortified gatehouse, described by Nikolaus Pevsner as "the most prominent of the English brick gatehouses of the 15th century". The gate was designed to evoke the owner's power and prestige, though as fortification its value is largely symbolic; it is flanked by tall polygonal towers rising in seven tiers, with symmetrical wings extending either side that reveal nothing on the exterior of their differing internal arrangements.

About 1835 the open end of the U was filled in with a picturesque, by no means archaeologically correct range that recreated the central courtyard. Other Victorian additions include the Flemish-style stepped gables, the massive southeast tower, the oriel windows overhanging the moat and terracotta chimneys. Four towers were added to the walled kitchen garden. In the 1830s under Sir Henry Paston-Bedingfeld, 6th Baronet, John Chessell Buckler and Augustus Pugin were commissioned to restore and develop the hall. A chapel was added, and the walled kitchen garden and flower gardens were rebuilt. A stable block was also added.

The hall is known for its priest hole, constructed by Nicholas Owen. The Catholic Bedingfelds constructed the closet, accessed through a lavatory, to enable the concealment of priests. The hall is also notable for the Oxburgh Hangings, needlework hangings by Mary, Queen of Scots and Bess of Hardwick. Mary worked on these while imprisoned in England, in the custody of the Earl of Shrewsbury.

A landscape park was laid out to the south and west of the house in the 1830s. A French parterre was laid out to the east of the moat at this time and a pleasure ground to the west of the new chapel was also created. The estate has a number of woodland walks, including a 'Woodland Explorer' trail.

Oxburgh Hall and the remaining estate was auctioned in lots in 1950. The Hall and gardens faced demolition in 1951, but were saved when Sybil, Lady Bedingfeld, her daughter Mrs Frances Playford, and niece Mrs Violet Hartcup raised enough funds to buy Oxburgh back, then gave it to the National Trust in 1952.

In 2021, the Trust announced plans for the reversion of the 175 acres of land at Oxburgh from farmland back to wildlife-friendly woods and pasture. The project will be informed by the use of photographs taken during an RAF aerial survey in 1946 and will see the planting of 227 trees to recreate habitats for local wildlife.

== Architecture and description ==
The hall has been listed Grade I on the National Heritage List for England since 1951. This is the highest level of designation. The landscaped and formal gardens of the hall have been Grade II listed on the Register of Historic Parks and Gardens since 1987.

== Gallery ==
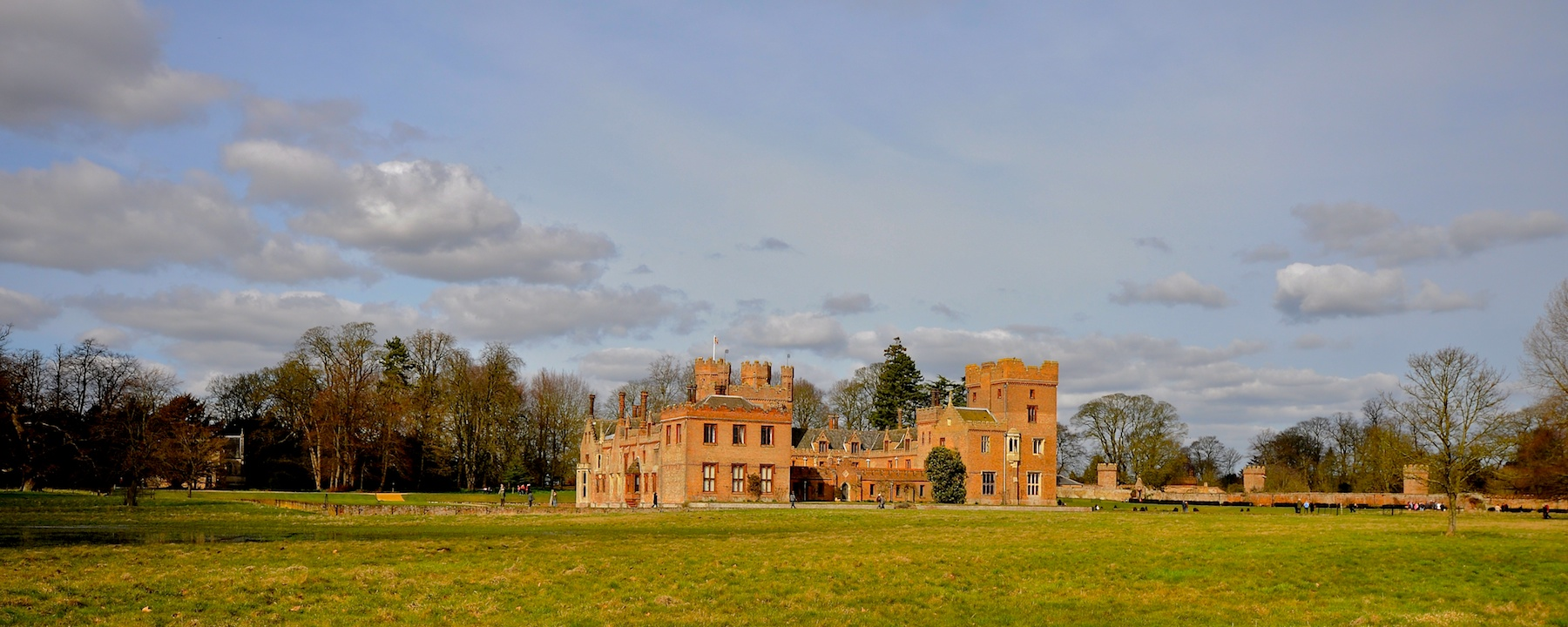
The hall seen from the south

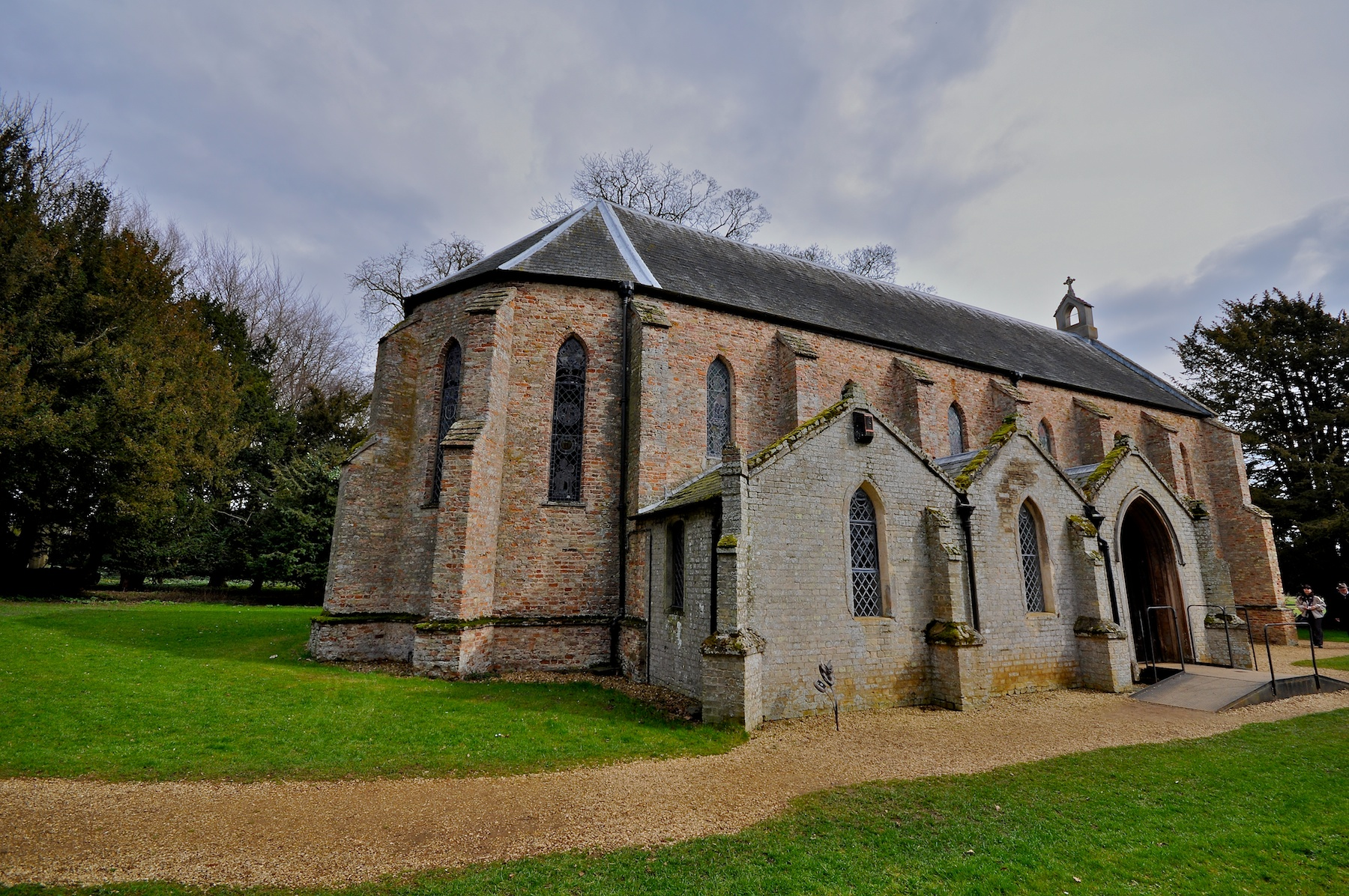
The 19th-century Roman Catholic chapel

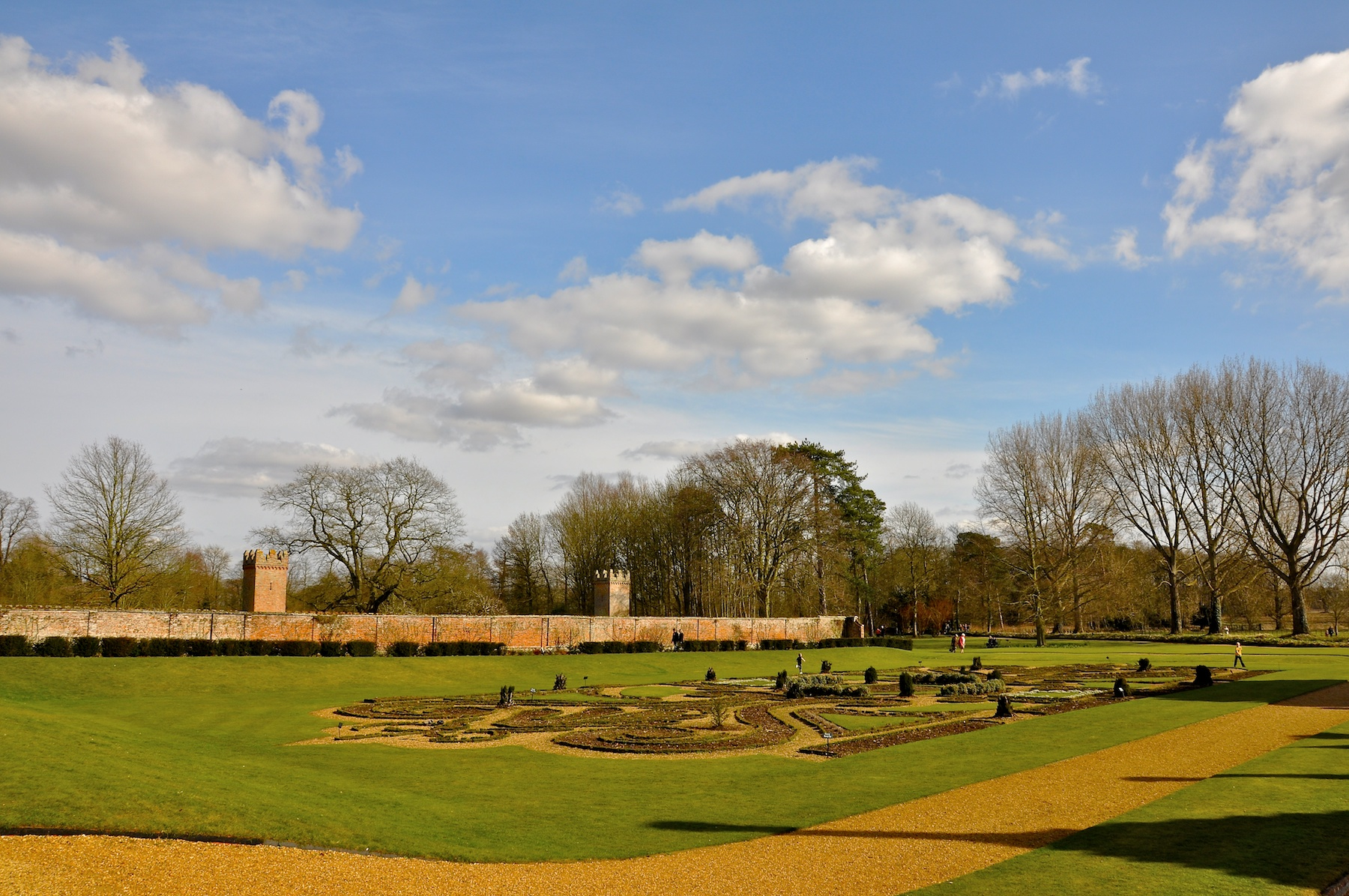
A Victorian pattern-parterre set in lawn

== Sources ==
- Garnett, Oliver (2000). Oxburgh Hall. London: National Trust for Places of Historic Interest or Natural Beauty. ISBN 1-84359-086-7. OCLC 1101258406.
- Pevsner, Nikolaus; Wilson, Bill (2002). Norfolk 2: North-West and South. The Buildings Of England. New Haven, US and London: Yale University Press. ISBN 978-0-300-09657-6.
