= Reginald Chandos-Pole =

English landowner and sheriff (1853–1930)

Reginald Walkelyne Chandos-Pole JP
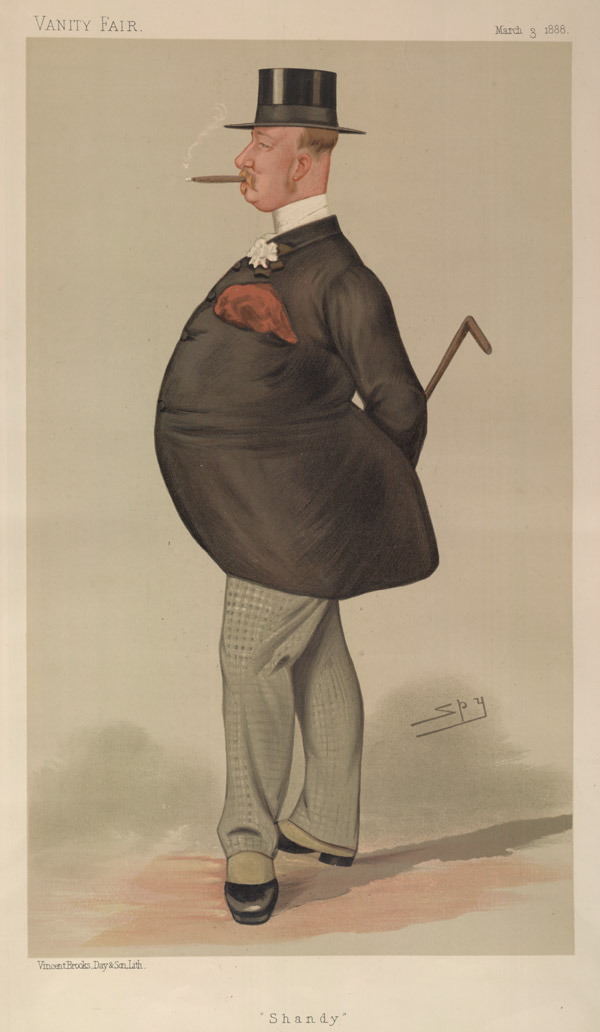
- Caricature of Chandos-Pole, by Spy in Vanity Fair, 1888

High Sheriff of Derbyshire
- In office 1905–1906
- Preceded by: William Curzon
- Succeeded by: Sir Robert Gresley Bt

Personal details
- Born: 4 February 1853; Dalbury Lees, South Derbyshire, Derbyshire
- Died: 20 October 1930 (aged 77); Radbourne Hall, Derby, Derbyshire
- Spouse(s): Violet Katharine Beckett-Denison (m. 1882; died 1883) Inez Blanche Marie Clothilde Eva Arent (m. 1898; died 1930)
- Children: 3
- Parent(s): Edward Sacheverell Chandos-Pole; Lady Anna Caroline Stanhope

Reginald Walkelyne Chandos-Pole JP (4 February 1853 – 20 October 1930) was an English landowner who served as High Sheriff of Derbyshire.

== Early life ==
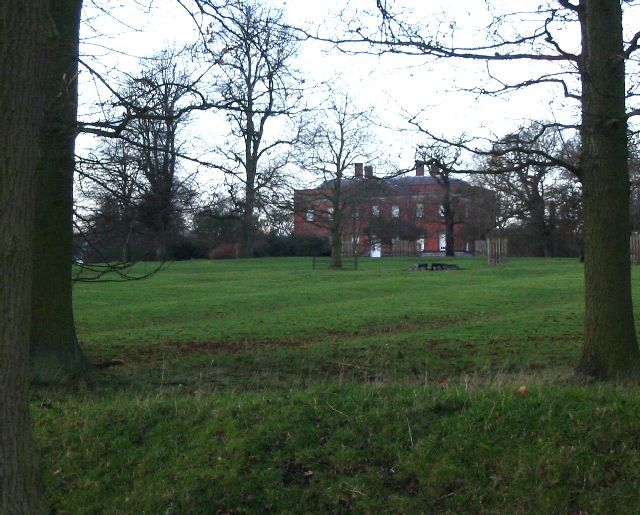
Radbourne Hall

Chandos-Pole was born at Dalbury Lees, South Derbyshire, Derbyshire on 4 February 1853. He was the eldest son of Edward Sacheverell Chandos-Pole (1826–1873), and Lady Anna Caroline Stanhope (1832–1914). Among his ten siblings were Carolina Chandos-Pole (who married Lord Claud John Hamilton, a son of the 1st Duke of Abercorn), and Alianore Chandos-Pole (who married Capt. Sir Wroth Lethbridge, 5th Baronet, and, after their divorce, her first cousin, Hon. Walter Yarde-Buller).

His paternal grandparents were Edward Sacheverell Chandos-Pole and Anna Maria Wilmot. His paternal uncle, Henry Chandos Pole Gell, took the arms and additional surname "Gell" when he succeeded to the estate at Hopton Hall. His aunt, Charlotte Chandos-Pole, married Hon. John Yarde-Buller (a son of the 1st Baron Churston), and other aunt, Eleanor Chandos-Pole, married Vice-Admiral Henry Bagot (a son of Rt. Rev. Hon. Richard Bagot). His maternal grandparents were Leicester Stanhope, 5th Earl of Harrington and the former Elizabeth Williams Green.

He was educated at Eton College from 1862 to 1869, where he played cricket.

== Career ==
In 1871, he joined the Grenadier Guards before retiring in 1878. He then served as Honorary Colonel of the Derbyshire Yeomanry.

He was a Justice of the Peace for Derbyshire. Upon his father's death in 1873, he inherited the family property of Radbourne Hall. Like his father and grandfather before him, he served as High Sheriff of Derbyshire in 1905.

== Personal life ==
On 7 March 1882 Chandos-Pole married Violet Katharine Beckett-Denison (1860–1883), a daughter of William Beckett-Denison (a younger son of Sir Edmund Beckett, 4th Baronet) and Hon. Helen Duncombe (a daughter of the 2nd Baron Feversham). Before her death on 18 March 1883 at age 22, they were the parents of:

- Dorothy Violet Chandos-Pole (1882–1954), who married Degge Wilmot-Sitwell, fourth son of the Solicitor-General of Victoria, Robert Sacheverell Wilmot-Sitwell and Mary Blanche Senior, in 1906.

After her death in 1883, he married Inez Blanche Marie Clothilde Eva Arent (1881–1941), younger daughter of Gen. Alfred Arent, former commanding general of the 11th Brandenburg Uhlans, on 26 October 1898. She was a friend of Dame Edith Sitwell. Together, they were the parents of two children:

- Winifred Olga Chandos-Pole (b. c. 1909), who married Bernard Martin Woog de Rustem in 1927.
- John Walkelyne Chandos-Pole (1913–1994), who married Ilsa Jill Barstz, daughter of Emil Ernst Barstz of Zurich, Switzerland, in 1947.

Chandos-Pole died at Radbourne Hall, Derby, Derbyshire on 20 October 1930, and was buried at St Andrews Churchyard in Radbourne.

Honorary titles
Preceded by William Curzon	High Sheriff of Derbyshire; 1905–1906	Succeeded by Sir Robert Gresley Bt
