= Edward Pole (British Army officer) =

Lieutenant-General Edward Pole (c. 1682 – 22 December 1762) was an officer of the British Army.

== Biography ==
The third son of Samuel Pole of Radbourne Hall in Derbyshire, Pole joined the Army as a second lieutenant in the Regiment of Welsh Fusiliers on 23 February 1709. He served with his regiment in the Netherlands during the War of the Spanish Succession, and was present at the battle of Malplaquet in 1709. The war ended with the Treaty of Utrecht in 1713, and Pole was promoted to captain on 13 August 1713. He was actively employed in suppressing the rebellion in Scotland in 1715 and 1716; on 22 December 1726 he became captain in Humphrey Gore's Regiment of Dragoons, and on 9 March 1732 he was promoted to major.

Pole was several years major in the 23rd Regiment of Foot. On 18 August 1739 he was promoted to the lieutenant-colonelcy of the 12th Regiment of Dragoons, and on 22 December 1747 he was promoted to colonel, succeeding to John Folliot's Regiment of Foot. On 10 August 1749 King George II rewarded his long and faithful service with the colonelcy of the 10th Regiment of Foot. He was promoted to the rank of major-general in 1757, and to that of lieutenant-general in 1759.

Lieutenant-General Pole died at Park Hall, Derbyshire, on 22 December 1762, aged eighty.

== Family ==
His son Edward Sacheverell Pole (1718–1780) was also an army officer, serving at the Battle of Fontenoy and reaching the rank of colonel. He was grandfather of Edward Sacheverell Chandos-Pole.

Military offices
Preceded by John Folliot	Colonel of the 61st Regiment of Foot; 1747–1748	Succeeded by Regiment disbanded
Preceded by The Lord Tyrawley	Colonel of the 10th Regiment of Foot; 1749–1763	Succeeded by Edward Sandford
