= Chandos =

Chandos may refer to:

== Titles ==
- Duke of Chandos, and Baron Chandos, three English titles, all extinct
- Viscount Chandos, a modern title in the Peerage of the United Kingdom

== Businesses ==
- Chandos Records
- Chandos Publishing

== Other uses ==
- Chandos (name)
- Chandos Lake, Ontario, Canada
- County of Chandos, South Australia
- Chandos Mausoleum, in the London Borough of Harrow, England
- Chandos House, London
- Chandos Chair of Medicine and Anatomy, University of St Andrews, Scotland

== See also ==
- Chandos Anthems, a collection of music written by George Frideric Handel
- Chandos portrait, a painting purportedly of William Shakespeare
- Duke of Buckingham and Chandos, title created for Richard Nugent Temple Grenville in 1822
