= John Buller (cricketer) =

English cricketer and British Army officer

Personal information
- Full name: John Yarde Buller
- Born: 23 December 1823; Elvaston, Derbyshire, England
- Died: 6 May 1867 (aged 43); Beverston, Gloucestershire, England

Domestic team information
- Years: Team
- 1850: Oxford University

Career statistics
Competition	First-class
Matches	1
Runs scored	3
Batting average	3.00
100s/50s	–/–
Top score	3*
Catches/stumpings	–/–
- Source: Cricinfo, 8 January 2020

John Yarde Buller (23 December 1823 – 6 May 1867) was an English first-class cricketer and British Army officer.

== Early life ==
Yarde-Buller was born in December 1823 at Elvaston, Derbyshire. He was the son of politician John Yarde-Buller, 1st Baron Churston and Elizabeth Wilson Patten. After the death of his mother in 1857, his father married Caroline Newman, a daughter of Sir Robert Newman, 1st Baronet of Mamhead House in 1861. From his parents' marriage, he had one sister, Hon. Bertha Yarde-Buller, who married Sir Massey Lopes, Baronet

His father was the eldest son of Sir Francis Buller-Yarde-Buller, 2nd Baronet and Elizabeth Holliday (only daughter and heiress of John Holliday of Dilhorne Hall). His maternal grandfather was Thomas Wilson-Patten of Bank Hall in Lancashire, and his maternal uncle was John Wilson-Patten, 1st Baron Winmarleigh.

He was educated at Eton College, before going up to University College, Oxford in 1841. He graduated B.A. in 1844, and M.A. in 1847.

== Career ==
Buller made a single appearance in first-class cricket for Oxford University against the Marylebone Cricket Club at Lord's in 1850. Batting twice in the match, he ended the Oxford first-innings of 97 all out unbeaten on 3, while in their second-innings he was dismissed without scoring by Samuel Dakin.

He later served in the South Devon Militia, where he gained the rank of Lieutenant-Colonel and succeeded his father in command.

== Personal life ==
In January 1845, Buller married Charlotte Chandos-Pole (1830–1895), a daughter of Edward Sacheverell Chandos-Pole of Radbourne Hall, Derby, and Anna Maria Wilmot. She had two brothers, Henry, took the arms and surname Gell when he succeeded to the estate at Hopton Hall, and Edward Sacheverell Chandos-Pole, who married Lady Anna Caroline Stanhope (a daughter of the 5th Earl of Harrington). Her sister, Eleanor, married Vice-Admiral Henry Bagot (a son of Rt. Rev. Hon. Richard Bagot). Together, they were the parents of:

- John Yarde-Buller, 2nd Baron Churston (1846–1910), who married Hon. Barbara Yelverton, daughter of Adm. Sir Hastings Yelverton and Barbara Yelverton, 20th Baroness Grey de Ruthyn, in 1872.
- Hon. Charlotte Mildred Yarde-Buller (b. c. 1849), who married Lt.-Col. John Richard Malone in 1872. They divorced in 1892 and she married Count Charles de Beaumont d'Autichamp in 1892.
- Hon. Louisa Maud Yarde-Buller (c. 1851–1882), who married Hon. Reginald Greville-Nugent, son of Fulke Greville-Nugent, 1st Baron Greville and Lady Rosa Emily Mary Anne Nugent (a daughter of the 1st Marquess of Westmeath), in 1871. After his death in 1878, she married Lt.-Col. James Charles Hope-Vere, son of William Edward Hope-Vere (son of James Hope-Vere, MP) and Lady Mary Emily Boyle (a granddaughter of the 8th Earl of Cork), in 1879.
- Hon. Eleanor Isabel Yarde-Buller (c. 1857–1913), who married Capt. Herbert Frederick Northey Hopkins, in 1890.
- Hon. Walter Yarde-Buller (1859–1935), who married Leilah Kirkham, daughter of General R. W. Kirkham, in 1886. After her death, he married his first cousin, Alianore Chandos-Pole, daughter of Edward Sacheverell Chandos-Pole and Lady Anna Caroline Stanhope (a daughter of the 5th Earl of Harrington), in 1913.
- Hon. Geoffrey Yarde-Buller (1861–1952), who married Olegaria Venancia Alverez, daughter of Don Florencio Alverez, in 1892.
- Hon. Sir Henry Yarde-Buller (1862–1928), who married Adelaide Maud Sophia Meeking, daughter of Lt.-Col. Charles Meeking, in 1902.
- Hon. Bertha Yarde-Buller (c. 1863–1931), who married Capt. Robert Henry Dewhurst in 1883.
- Hon. Reginald John Yarde-Buller (1864–1950), Canon of Truro Cathedral and Vicar of Dean Prior; he married Hon. Mary Vere Agar-Robartes, daughter of Thomas Agar-Robartes, 6th Viscount Clifden and Mary Dickenson (a daughter of Francis Henry Dickinson), in 1919.

He died in May 1867 at Chavenage House in Beverston, Gloucestershire, in doing so he predeceased his father. Upon the death of his father, who held the title Baron Churston, he was succeeded as the 2nd Baron by Buller's son, John. He is the great-great grandfather of Aga Khan IV.
