= German Pole =

German Pole may refer to:

- German Pole (politician), member of Parliament for Derbyshire in 1656
- German minority in Poland
- Polish minority in Germany

== See also ==
- German–Polish relations
