= Francis Bagshawe =

British landowner

Francis Westby Bagshawe (4 April 1832 – 28 April 1896) was an English landowner who served as High Sheriff of Derbyshire in 1868.

== Life ==
Bagshawe was born at Norton, Derbyshire, the son of barrister William John Bagshawe of Wormhill Hall, Wormhill, Derbyshire, and his wife Sarah Partridge. He was educated at Uppingham School from 1848 and admitted at Trinity College, Cambridge on 12 June 1851, being awarded BA in 1855 and MA in 1860.

Bagshawe succeeded to the estates of his elder brother, the renowned oarsman William Bagshawe, in 1854 after William was killed in an affray with poachers at Millers Dale. The estates included Oakes Park, near Sheffield; Wormhill Hall, Derbyshire; and Cotes Hall, which he sold in 1883. In 1862 he was promoted to Lieutenant in the Yorkshire Yeomanry Cavalry. He was J.P. and Deputy Lieutenant for Derbyshire and J.P. for the West Riding of Yorkshire. In 1868 he was High Sheriff of Derbyshire.

Bagshawe died at the age of 64 and was buried at St Margaret's, Wormhill.

== Family ==
Bagshawe married Caroline Amelia Cloyne Godwin-Austen, seventh daughter of Robert Alfred Cloyne Godwin-Austen. They had two daughters.

Honorary titles
Preceded by Edward Sacheverell Chandos-Pole	High Sheriff of Derbyshire; 1868–1869	Succeeded by George Henry Strutt
