= Robert Wynter Blathwayt =

Robert Wynter Blathwayt JP
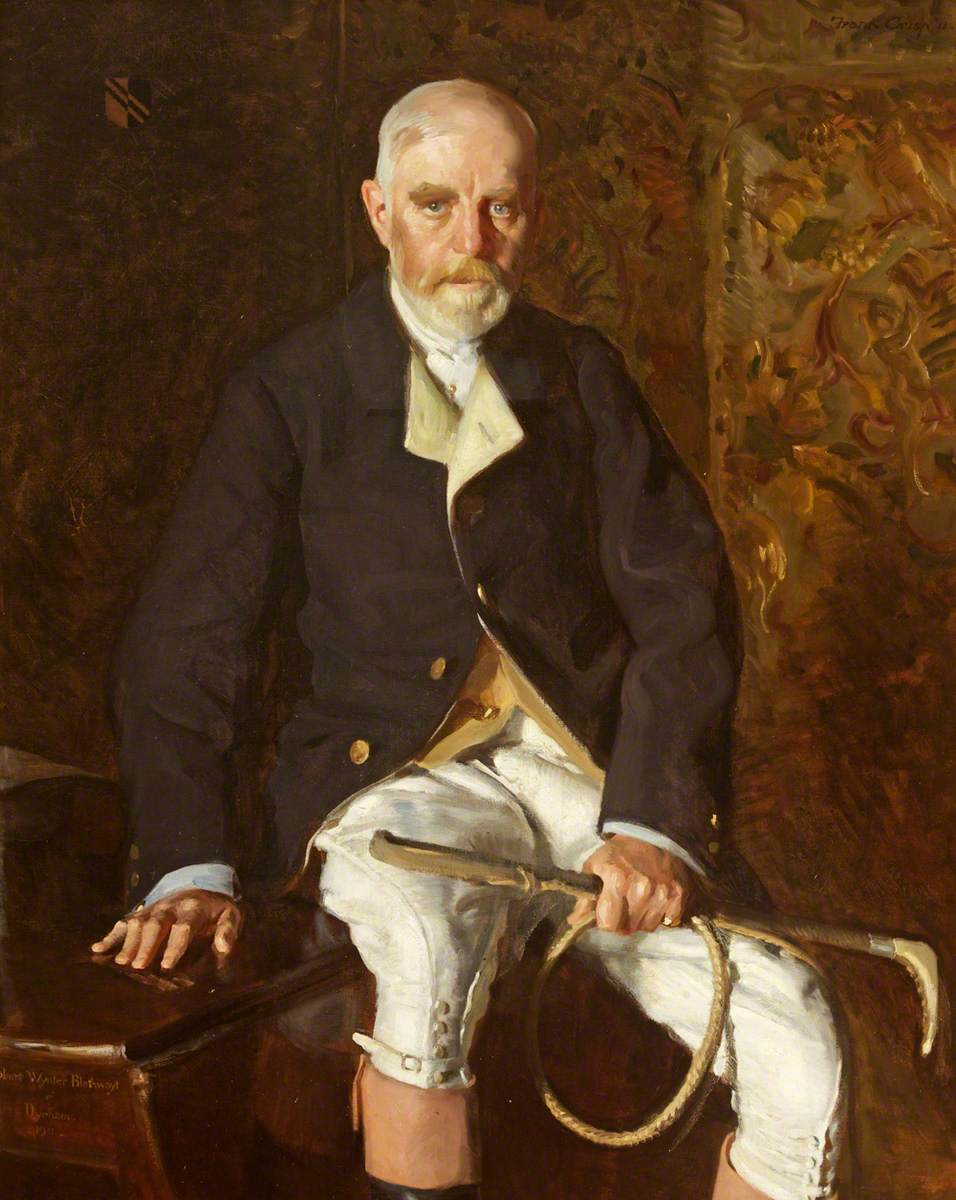
- Portrait of Blathwayt by Francis Edward Crisp, 1911
- Born: 7 July 1850; Lower Tean, Staffordshire, England
- Died: 2 November 1936 (aged 86); South Gloucestershire, England
- Spouse: Margaret Ermentrude Chandos-Pole-Gell (m. 1879; died 1927)
- Parent(s): Wynter Thomas Blathwayt; Frances Elizabeth Philips

Robert Wynter Blathwayt JP (7 July 1850 – 2 November 1936) was an English landowner.

== Early life ==
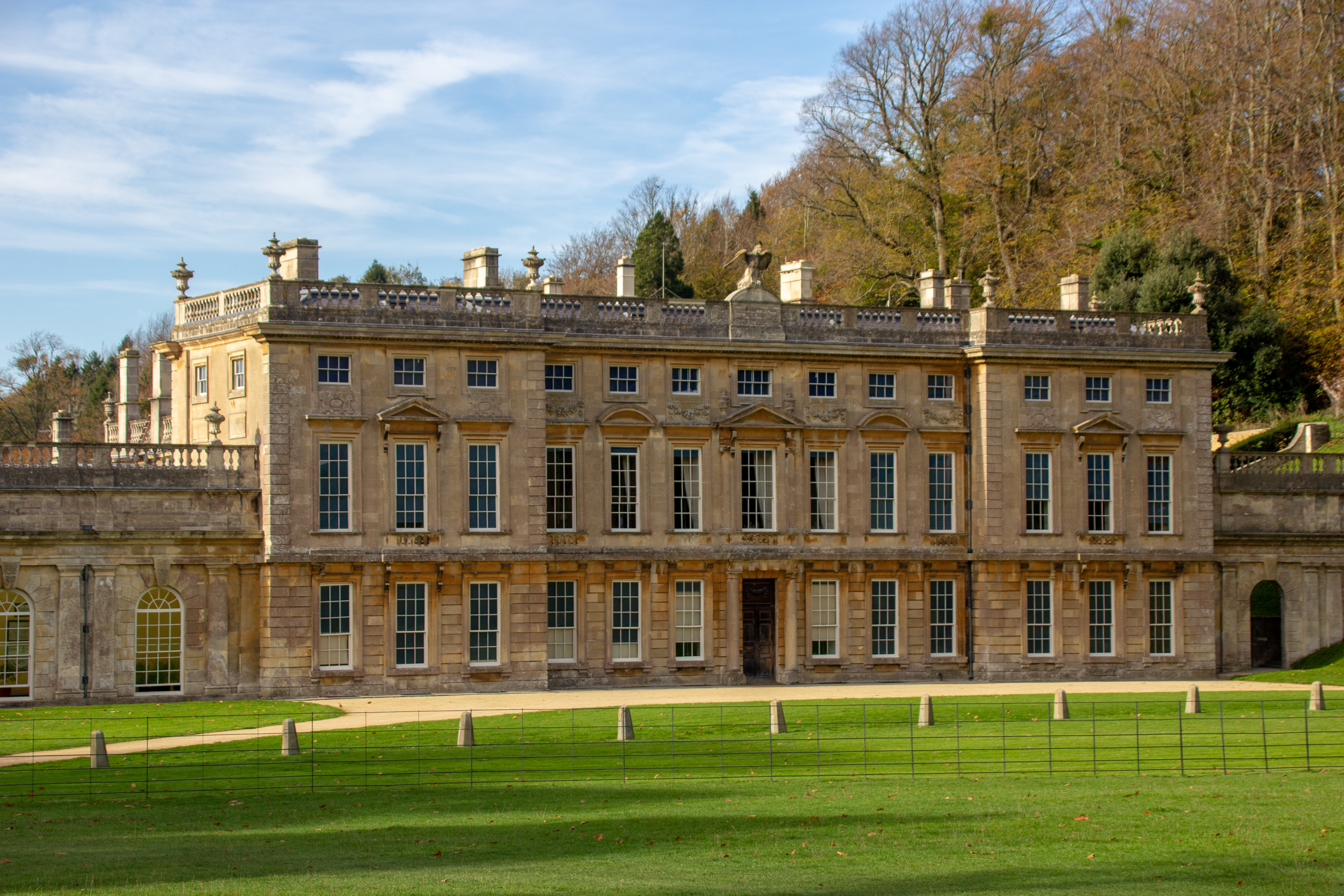
Dyrham Park, 2018

Robert Blathwayt was born on 7 July 1850 at Heybridge, the former home of his mother in Lower Tean, Staffordshire. He was the son of the Rev. Wynter Thomas Blathwayt (1825–1909), rector of Dyrham, and Frances Elizabeth "Fanny" (née Philips) Blathwayt (1830–1869). He had two brothers, George William Wynter Blathwayt and the Rev. Wynter Edward Blathwayt. After his mother's death from tuberculosis in 1869, his father married Mary Sarah Oates in 1876.

His paternal grandparents were Col. George William Blathwayt and Marianne (née Vesey) Blathwayt. His maternal grandparents were Robert Philips (son of John Burton Philips of The Heath House, of J. & N. Philips textiles) and Laetitia (née Hibbert) Philips.

== Career ==
In 1909, he inherited the family seat, Dyrham Park, following the death of his father.

A lord of the manor of Dyrham, Langridge and Porlock, he also served as justice of the peace.

== Personal life ==
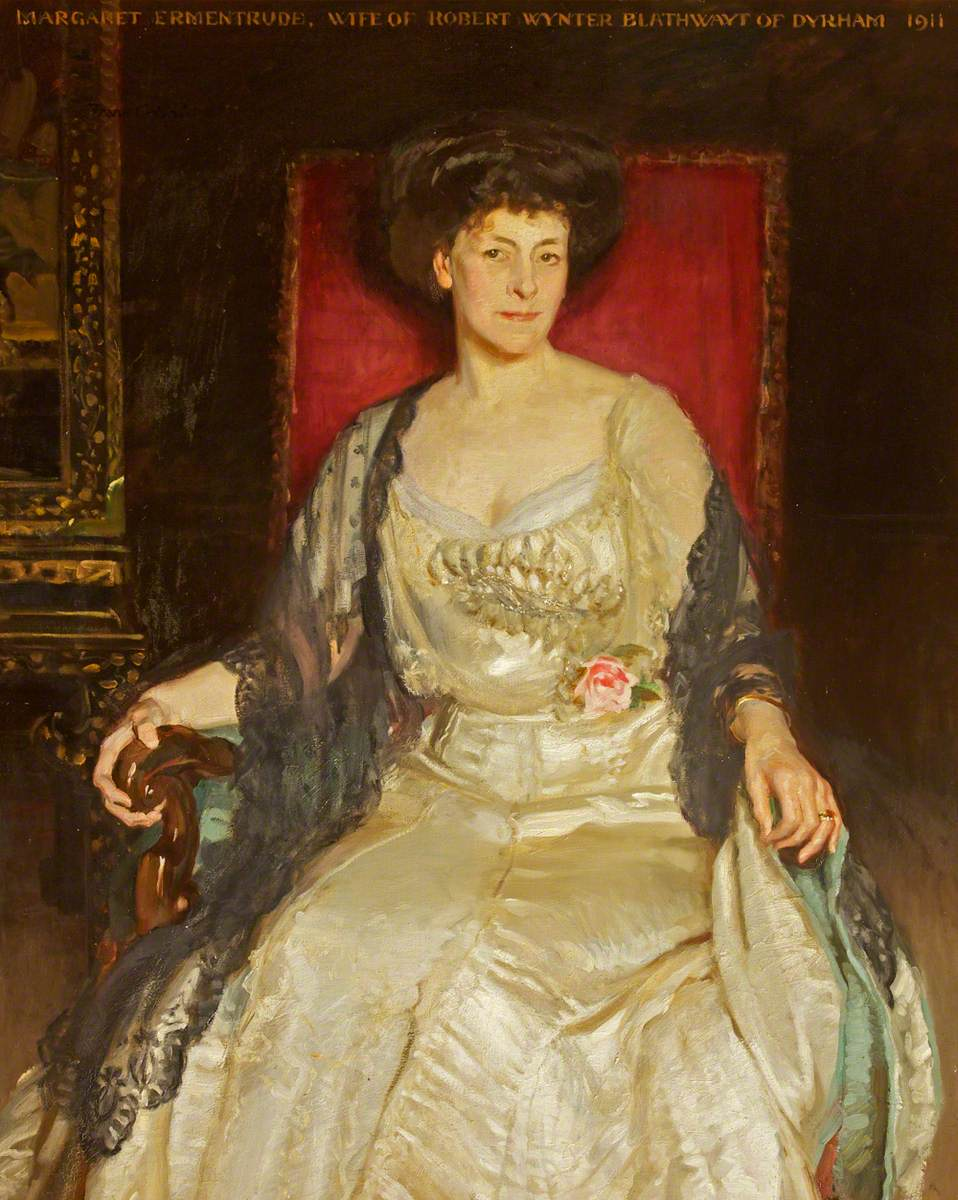
Portrait of his wife, Margaret, by Francis Edward Crisp, 1911

On 9 October 1879, he married Margaret Ermentrude Chandos-Pole-Gell (1854–1927), a daughter of Henry Chandos Pole Gell of Hopton Hall, and, his first wife, Henrietta Auriol Drummond-Hay (a daughter of Edward Drummond-Hay). There were no children of the marriage.

Blathwayt died on 2 November 1936 and was buried at St Peter's Churchyard in Dyrham. After his death, Dyrham Park passed to the children of his cousin, Henry Wynter Blathwayt, who was killed at the Battle of Cambrai in 1917.
