= Radbourne Hall =

Historic house in Derbyshire, United Kingdom

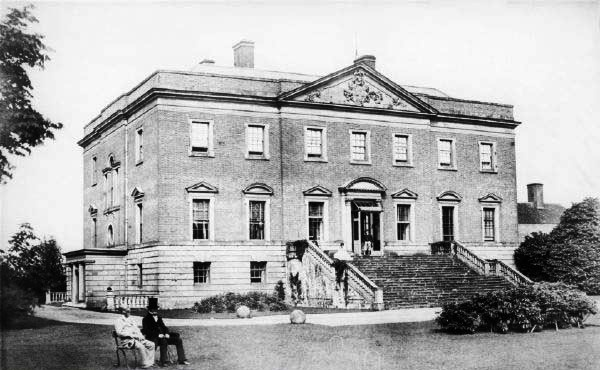
- Radbourne Hall in the 1860s

- Location within Derbyshire

General information
- Status: Country house
- Architectural style: Georgian
- Location: Radbourne, Derbyshire, United Kingdom
- Coordinates: 52.9173°N 1.5755°W
- Construction started: 1739

Listed Building – Grade I
- Official name: Radbourne Hall
- Designated: 2 September 1952
- Reference no.: 1334517

Radbourne Hall is an 18th-century Georgian country house, the seat of the Chandos-Pole family, at Radbourne, Derbyshire. It is a Grade I listed building.

== History ==
The Manor of Radbourne has been held by the Chandos family from the time of the Norman Conquest. It is one of the few UK landed estates that has passed only by inheritance and marriage since the Conquest, when William the Conqueror’s ally Henry de Ferrers was granted it in the 11th century. On the death of Sir John Chandos, an original Knight of the order of the Garter, in 1369 it passed to his niece who married Sir Peter de la Pole of Newborough, Staffordshire.

The present house was built in about 1739 for his descendant German Pole, probably by architect William Smith the Younger. The previous building, located in the hollow towards the village of Radbourne, supposedly was able to sleep 100 people in beds and have stabling for 200 horses. When the brook flooded, barrels of beer had to be collected from the cellar by boat. The brick construction has two red-brick storeys placed over a stone-based basement storey. The entrance front has seven bays, the central three of which slightly project and crowned with a stone carved pediment bearing the Pole family arms.

The park was originally laid out in 1790 by William Emes.

In 1807 Edward Sacheverell Pole adopted by sign manual the additional surname of Chandos to commemorate his descent from Sir John Chandos. Since then the family surname has been Chandos-Pole. Edward Sacheverell Chandos-Pole, High Sheriff in 1827, was succeeded in that office by his son and namesake, Edward Jr.. He extended and modernised the property in 1865.

The next major refurbishment occurred in the late 1950s, under the instruction of the owner Major John Walkelyne Chandos-Pole, DL, JP (son of Reginald Chandos-Pole and grandson of Edward Jr.), when part of the extended wing was pulled down, which included the ballroom and a servants' wing. The interior design was undertaken by John Beresford Fowler of Colefax & Fowler.

A succession of Poles and Chandos-Poles were rectors of St Andrew's Church in Radbourne: 1715, Samuel Pole; 1758, John le Hunt, whose patron was German Pole; 1790, Edward Pole, whose patron was Sacheverell Pole; 1824, H. Reginald Chandos-Pole, whose patron was Edward Sacheverell Chandos-Pole. Finally, in August 1866 William Chandos-Pole became vicar, whose patrons were John Yarde Buller, Edward Levett and Rev. William Chandos-Pole.

Several members of the Pole family served as High Sheriff of Derbyshire, including Samuel Pole (1651–1731), who was the father of Edward Pole, a lieutenant-general, and Charles Pole, a Member of Parliament. The Pole Baronets of Wolverton, Hampshire, descend from Charles Pole.

Erasmus Darwin lived in the house briefly, following his marriage in 1781 to Elizabeth Pole.

== See also ==
- Grade I listed buildings in Derbyshire
- Listed buildings in Radbourne, Derbyshire
