= Henry Chandos Pole Gell =

Henry Chandos-Pole-Gell
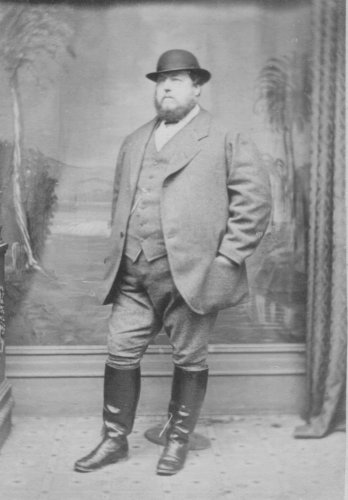

High Sheriff of Derbyshire
- In office 1886–1887
- Preceded by: Edward Henry Pares
- Succeeded by: Frederick Charles Arkwight

Personal details
- Born: 10 January 1829
- Died: 31 October 1902 (aged 73)
- Spouse(s): Henrietta Auriol Drummond-Hay (m. 1851; died 1868) Teresa Charlotte Manningham-Buller (m. 1869; died 1902)
- Children: 6, including Harry
- Parent(s): Edward Sacheverell Chandos-Pole; Anna Maria Wilmot

Henry Chandos Pole Gell (10 January 1829 – 31 October 1902) was a High Sheriff of Derbyshire in 1886/7. He took the additional surname Gell when he inherited the Gell fortune in 1842, and lived at Hopton Hall in Hopton, Derbyshire.

== Early life ==
Henry Chandos Pole was the second son of Edward Sacheverell Chandos-Pole, of Radbourne Hall, and Anna Maria Wilmot, a daughter of Rev. Edward Sacheverel Wilmot. His elder brother, Edward Sacheverell Chandos Pole, married Lady Anna Caroline Stanhope (a daughter of the 5th Earl of Harrington), while his younger sisters, Charlotte Chandos-Pole, married Hon. John Yarde-Buller (a son of the 1st Baron Churston), and Eleanor Chandos-Pole, married Vice-Admiral Henry Bagot (a son of Rt. Rev. Hon. Richard Bagot).

His paternal grandparents were Mary Ware and Sacheverell Pole, who later adopted the additional surname of Chandos, in 1807.

== Career ==
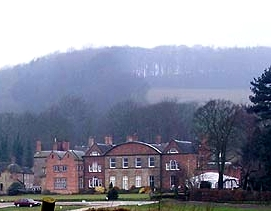
Hopton Hall

In 1842, he took the arms and surname Gell when he succeeded to the estate at Hopton Hall. Gell was High Sheriff in 1866/7. For many years main residence was at Heverswood (south of Brasted) in Kent as he leased Hopton Hall to a relative.

Gell took an active interest in agricultural development, and was a member of the council of the Royal Agricultural Society of England. A contemporary obituary states that Gell was ″well known throughout the country by reason of the deep interest he took in agriculture... he maintained an excellent heard of shorthorns at Hopton, and was one of the first to perceive the importance of the shire horse.″

== Personal life ==
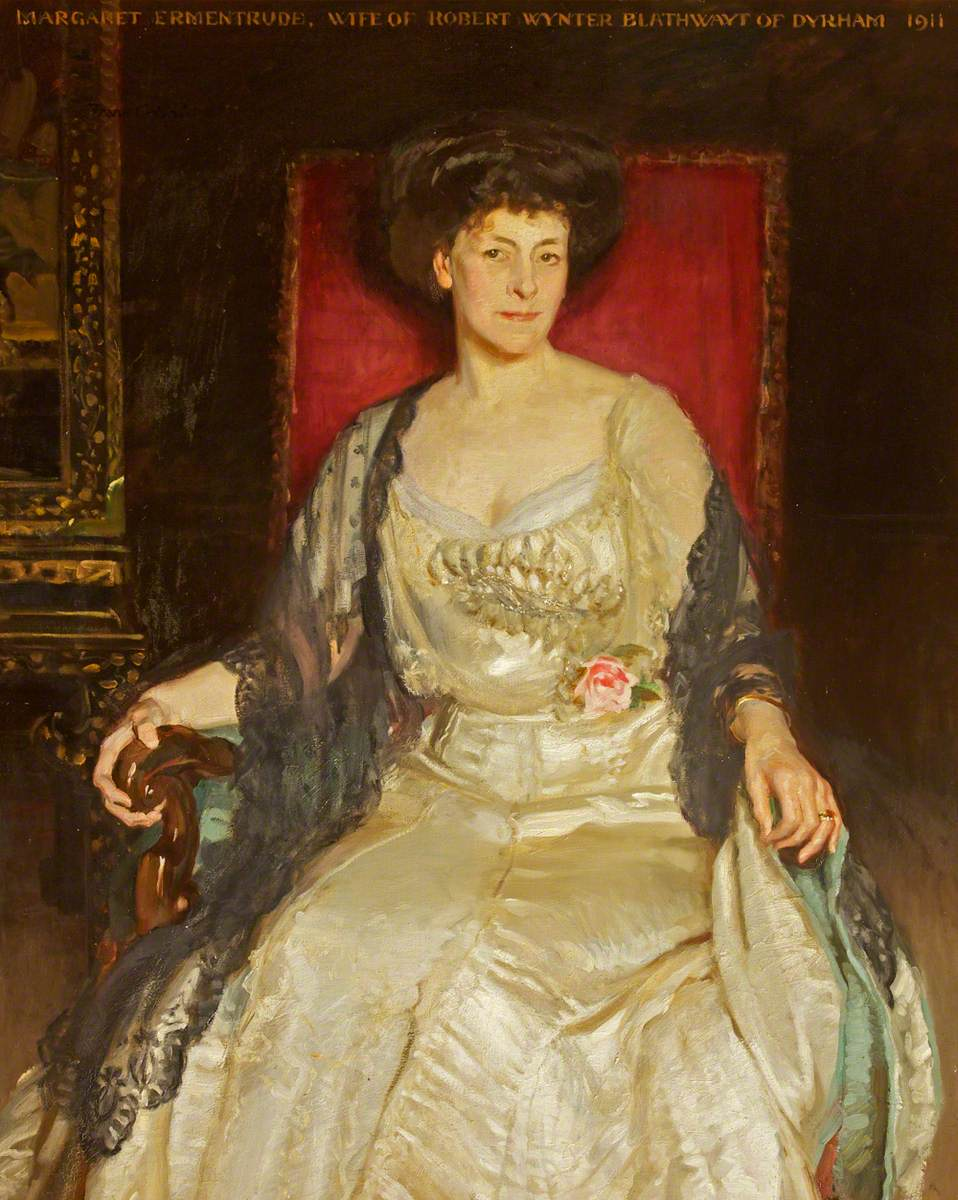
Portrait of his daughter, Margaret, by Francis Edward Crisp, 1911

In 1851, Chandos-Pole-Gell married Henrietta Auriol Drummond-Hay (1832–1868), a daughter of Edward Drummond-Hay and Louisa Margaret Thomson. She was one of ten children including Sir Edward Drummond-Hay and Sir John Hay Drummond Hay. Before her death in 1868, they were the parents of five daughters, including:

- Cicely Eleanor Chandos-Pole (1853–1935), who married, as his second wife, Edmund Waldo Meade-Waldo of Hever Castle, a son of Edmund Wakefield Meade-Waldo and Harriette Bloomfield Rochfort, in 1879.
- Margaret Ermentrude Chandos-Pole-Gell (1854–1927), who married Robert Wynter "Bobbie" Blathwayt of Dyrham Park, eldest son of the Rev. W. T. Blathwayt, in 1879.
- Katharine Laura Chandos-Pole-Gell (1856–1870), who died unmarried.
- Edith Frances Chandos-Pole-Gell (1858–1922), who married Richard Edward Elliot Chambers, in 1894.
- Mabel Alice Chandos-Pole-Gell (1858–1859), who died young.

In 1869, he married Teresa Charlotte Manningham-Buller, daughter of Sir Edward Manningham-Buller, 1st Baronet, of Dilhorne Hall, Staffordshire. They had a son:

- Harry Anthony Chandos-Pole-Gell (1872–1934), who became a Brigadier-General and relinquished the surname Gell in the 1930s; he married Ada Ismay, a daughter of Thomas Henry Ismay.

Gell died at his residence Hopton Hall on 31 October 1902, and he was buried at Carsington.

Honorary titles
Preceded by Edward Henry Pares	High Sheriff of Derbyshire; 1886–1887	Succeeded by Frederick Charles Arkwight
