= German Pole (politician) =

German Pole (6 October 1626 – 28 March 1683) was an English politician and member of the notable Pole family of Radbourne, Derbyshire. He served as a member of parliament (MP) for Derbyshire during the Second Protectorate Parliament in 1656.

== Early life and family ==
Born into the distinguished Pole family, German was the son of Samuel Pole and Anne Mundy. The Poles had longstanding ties to Radbourne, with their lineage tracing back to the 14th century. On 17 December 1650, German married Anne Newdigate, the eldest daughter of Richard Newdigate of Arbury, Warwickshire. The couple did not have any children.

== Political career ==
In 1656, during the rule of the Lord Protector Oliver Cromwell, German Pole was elected to serve as one of the MPs for Derbyshire in the Second Protectorate Parliament.

== Later life and death ==
Pole was known for his piety, loyalty to the monarchy, and dedication to his country. He died on 28 March 1683 without issue and appointed Samuel Pole, son of Edward Pole, as his sole heir. He was interred at St. Andrew's Church in Radbourne, where a significant wall monument, attributed to the renowned sculptor Grinling Gibbons, commemorates him. This monument features a large gadrooned sarcophagus flanked by urns and is topped with a segmental pediment adorned with putti.
