= Mary Sarah Oates =

Jamaican-British estate owner (1833–1925)

- Born: 1833; Hanover, Jamaica
- Died: 1925 (aged 91)
- Burial place: Dyrham, Gloucestershire, England
- Other name: Mary Sarah Blathwayt
- Relatives: Robert Wynter Blathwayt (stepson)

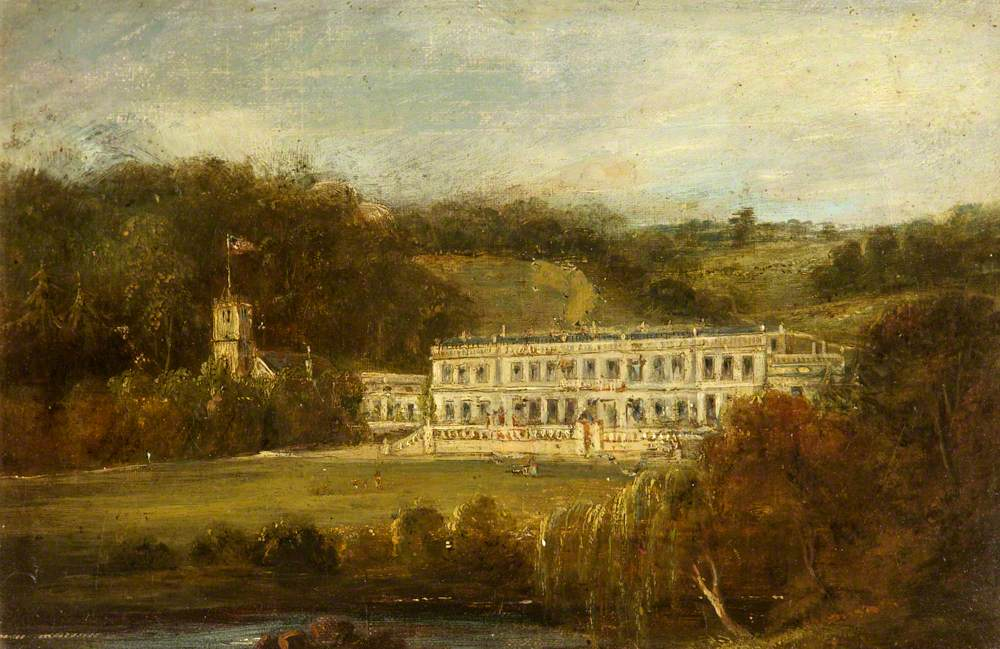
A 19th-century painting of Dyrham Park, where Mary Sarah Oates became lady of the house in 1899

Mary Sarah Oates (married name Blathwayt, 1833–1925) was a Jamaican-British estate owner. Born in Jamaica to a white father and black mother, she was raised in Bath and became the lady of Dyrham Park, Gloucestershire, in 1899.

== Early life in Jamaica ==
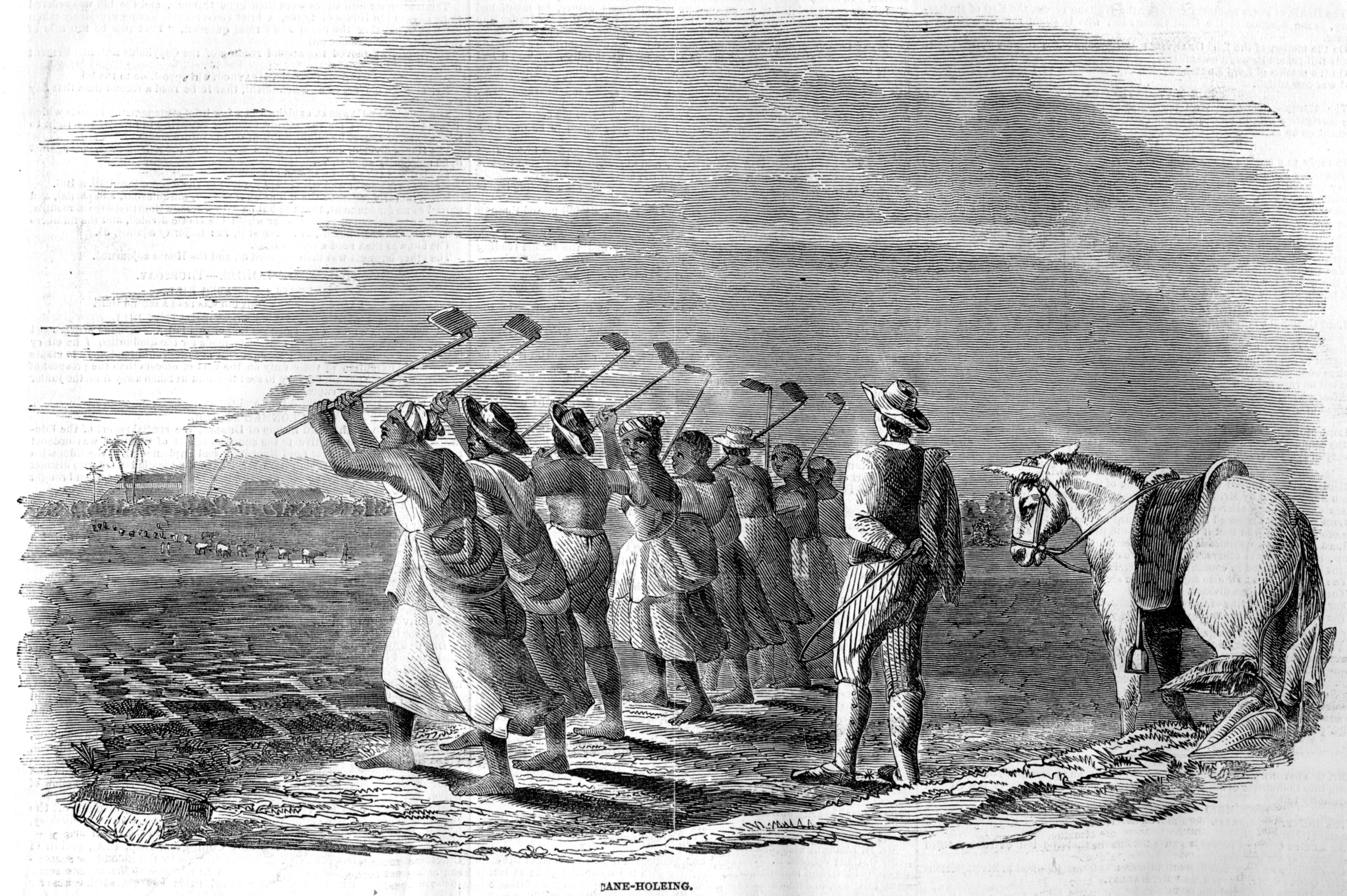
1849 illustration of a Jamaican sugar plantation

Mary Sarah Oates was born in Hanover, Jamaica in 1833 to George Hibbert Oates, manager of a sugar plantation called Georgia. Oates' family had long been involved in Jamaican sugar plantations and his uncle was the slave trader George Hibbert. In 1824, Oates had been accused by Unitarian minister Thomas Cooper of poorly treating the black enslaved people on his estate, and of cohabiting with and impregnating a sixteen-year-old ‘quadroon’ girl.

Mary Sarah’s mother was a free black woman called Margaret Cross, with whom Oates had five children. In his will, Oates left £100 each to three of his children (Jane, George Thomas, and Mary), and left land to another former slave, Elizabeth Williams, and to his reputed child with her, Anna Maria. His children were considered slaves until the passing of the Slavery Abolition Act 1833.

== Life in England ==
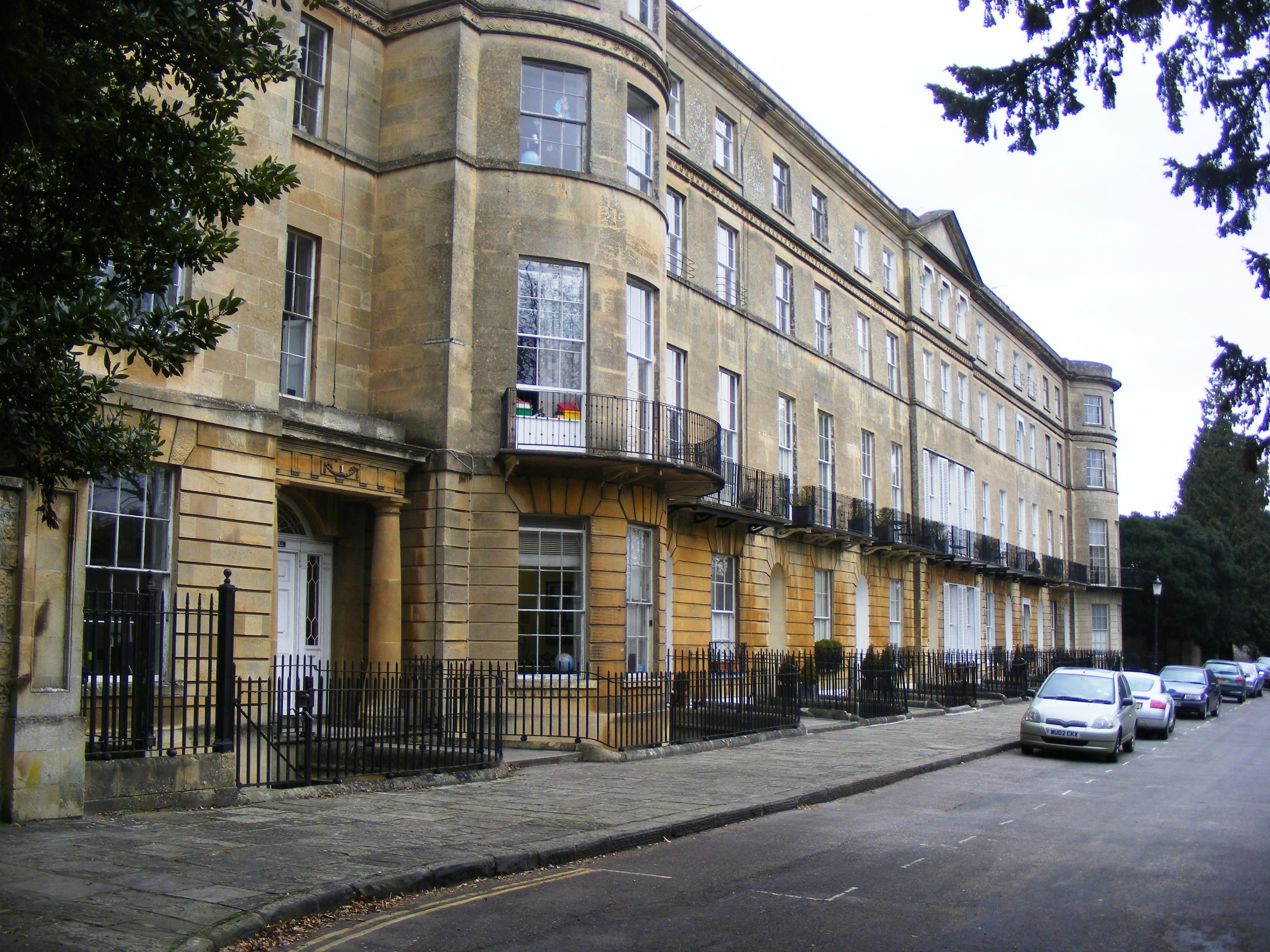
Sion Hill, Bath, where Mary Sarah was raised by her grandmother and aunt

After the death of her father in 1837, Mary Sarah came to Bath, England in 1840, where she was raised by her paternal grandmother Mary and her aunt, Anna Maria. They lived comfortably on annuities provided by their male relatives. A travel journal survives in which Mary Sarah writes about a trip she took to France in 1867, and includes watercolour paintings by her.

When Anna Maria died in 1870, the executor of her will was Rev. Wynter Thomas Blathwayt. He had lost his wife Frances to tuberculosis the year before, and had three sons.

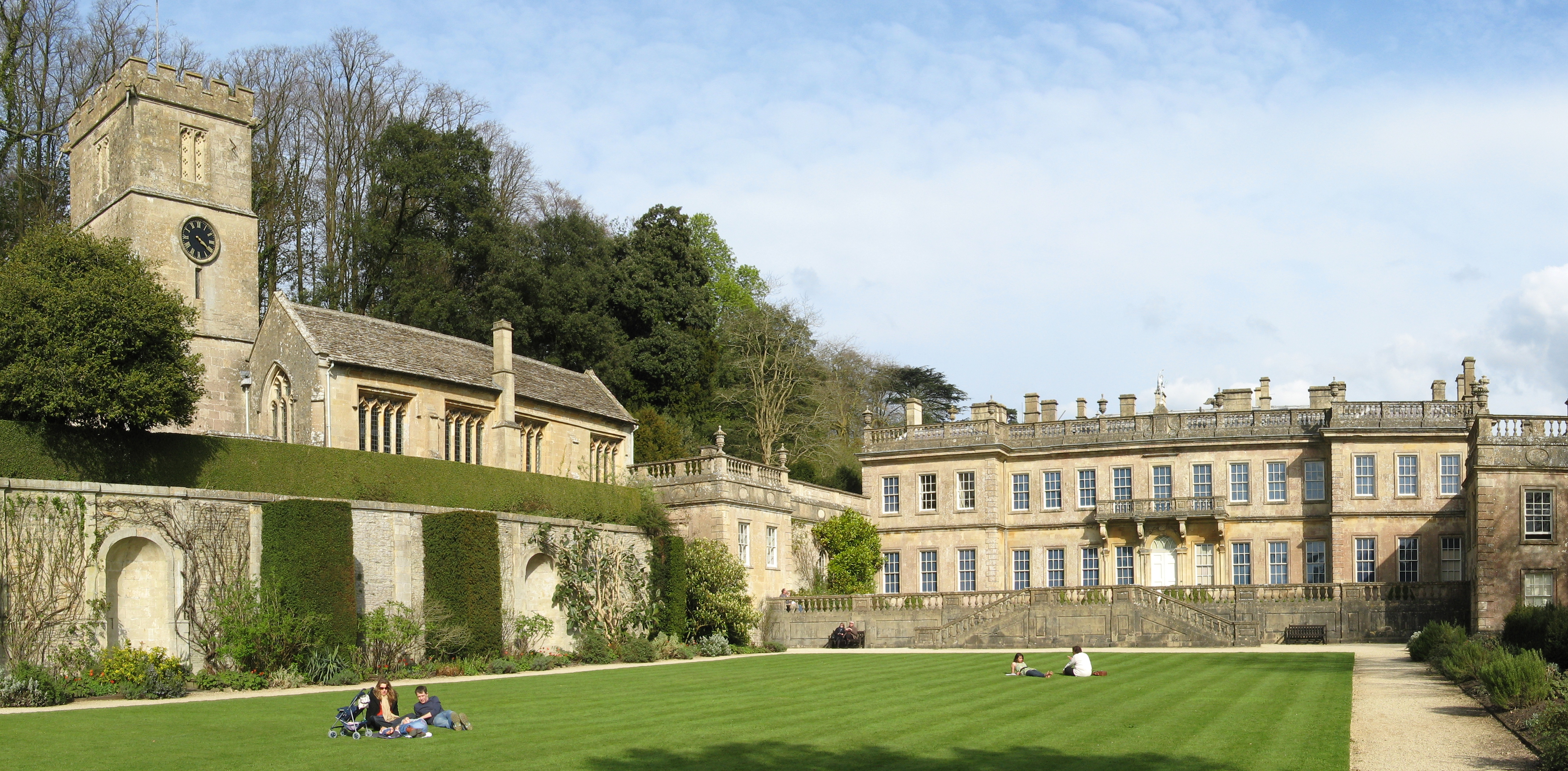
Dyrham Park and the church where Mary Sarah's husband served as rector

Mary Sarah and Wynter Thomas Blathwayt married in 1876 and lived in the rectory at Dyrham, where he served as rector from 1878. On the death of Wynter’s brother in 1899, they inherited the Dyrham estate, which had been revived by their father, Lieutenant Colonel George Blathwayt, in the decades before. Mary Sarah Blathwayt thus became lady of the house, and appears in several photographs and a silhouette held by the National Trust there. The house was managed by Wynter’s eldest son Robert Wynter Blathwayt, who sold some of the collection to fund the installation of electricity.

Surviving her husband by 16 years, Mary died on 24 March 1925, and is buried with her husband in the churchyard of Dyrham, which adjoins the estate.
