= Listed buildings in Radbourne, Derbyshire =

Radbourne is a civil parish in the South Derbyshire district of Derbyshire, England. The parish contains nine listed buildings that are recorded in the National Heritage List for England. Of these, two are listed at Grade I, the highest of the three grades, and the others are at Grade II, the lowest grade. The parish contains the village of Radbourne and the surrounding area. The most important buildings are a church and a country house, both of which are listed at Grade I. Apart from items in the garden of the country house and a bridge, all the other listed buildings are farmhouses.

== Key ==
Grade	Criteria
I	Buildings of exceptional interest, sometimes considered to be internationally important
II	Buildings of national importance and special interest

== Buildings ==
Name and location	Photograph	Date	Notes	Grade
St Andrew's Church; 52.92064°N 1.57613°W		13th century	The church, which has been altered and extended through the centuries, is in sandstone and has a tile roof. It consists of a nave, a north aisle, a chancel, and a tower at the northwest angle of the nave. The tower, which is in Perpendicular style, has two stages, diagonal buttresses in the western corners, clasping buttresses in the eastern corners, and a moulded string course. On the west side are a lancet window with a trefoil head and a staircase window, and the upper stage contains pointed bell openings with hood moulds and on the south front is a clock face. At the top are embattled coped parapets, corner pinnacles, the northwest one crocketed, and a wrought iron weathervane.	I
Thatched Farmhouse; 52.92376°N 1.57942°W	—	Late 17th century	The farmhouse, which has been altered, is partly timber framed with brick nogging on a stone plinth and partly in red brick, and has a tile roof. There are two storeys and an L-shaped plan, consisting of a two-bay range and a projecting bay to the east. On the south front is a doorway and casement windows with pointed heads. On the other fronts are eyebrow dormers, and inside the farmhouse is an inglenook fireplace.	II
Radbourne Hall; 52.91737°N 1.57559°W		1739	A country house that has been altered and extended, it is in red brick with stone dressings, a rusticated stone basement on a plinth, with a sill band, a moulded cornice, stone coped parapets, and a hipped tile roof. There are two storeys over the basement, and a front of seven bays, the middle three bays projecting under a pediment containing a coat of arms. A flight of steps with balusters leads up to a central doorway with Corinthian columns, a pulvinated frieze and a dentilled segmental pediment. The windows are sashes, in the basement with rusticated voussoirs, in the ground floor with moulded surrounds, pulvinated friezes and alternating segmental and triangular pediments, and in the top floor with moulded surrounds.	I
Old Park Farmhouse; 52.92189°N 1.57804°W	—	Mid 18th century	The farmhouse is in red brick with a sawtooth eaves band, and a tile roof with stone coped gables and moulded kneelers. There are two storeys and attics, and three bays. On the front is a central gabled porch and a doorway with a segmental head, and the windows are casements, also with segmental heads. Inside the farmhouse is an inglenook fireplace.	II
Potlocks Farmhouse; 52.91624°N 1.56115°W	—	Mid 18th century	A red brick farmhouse with stone dressings, quoins, a sawtooth eaves band and a tile roof. There are two storeys and three bays. On the front is a central gabled porch with a segmental headed arch, and the windows are casements with segmental heads. Inside the farmhouse is an inglenook fireplace.	II
Silverhill Farmhouse; 52.92220°N 1.56836°W	—	Mid 18th century	The farmhouse, which was extended in thee mid-19th century, is in red brick with stone dressings, a dentilled eaves band to the original part, and tile roofs. The original part has two storeys and attics and two bays, and the extension has two storeys and four bays. The windows are casements with segmental heads, those in the extension with keystones. In the extension are doorways each with a segmental head, a fanlight and a keystone.	II
Urns and steps in garden of Radbourne Hall; 52.91716°N 1.57592°W	—	Late 18th century	There are eight urns in Coade stone. Two flights of sandstone steps lead into the sunken garden, and at the base of each flight is a pair of urns. Each of these urns is thistle-shaped on a moulded base on a square plinth, it is fluted at the bottom, and has a grotesque on the north and south sides. The other urns are at the corners of the garden, on deep square plinths and with square bases. They are shaped like a wide shallow bowl, and have a grotesque head on the north and south.	II
Terrel Hays Farmhouse; 52.91127°N 1.59135°W	—	Late 18th century	The farmhouse is in red brick with a sawtooth eaves band and a tile roof. There are three storeys, a front of three bays, and a large rear wing. In the centre is a gabled porch with pierced bargeboards, and a doorway with a cambered head. The windows are casements, those in the lower two floors with segmental heads, and in the top floor with flat heads.	II
Bridge south of St Andrew's Church; 52.92023°N 1.57602°W	—	Early 19th century	The footbridge, which crosses a steam to the south of the church, is in sandstone and consists of a single segmental arch. The bridge has rusticated voussoirs, a keystone, a moulded string course, and plain parapets with chamfered copings. At the ends are square piers with shallow pyramidal copings.	II
