= Samuel Dakin =

English cricketer

Samuel Dakin (12 April 1808 – 27 December 1876) was an English first-class cricketer active 1840–55 who played mostly for MCC or The North. He was born in Sileby; died in Cambridge. Dakin was a right-handed batsman, a medium pace roundarm bowler and an occasional wicketkeeper who played in 45 matches. He scored 834 career runs with a highest score of 64; held 22 catches; completed one stumping; and took 35 wickets with a best return of four for 3.
