= Radbourne, Derbyshire =

Village in Derbyshire, England

Coordinates: 52.923°N 1.580°W

Radbourne
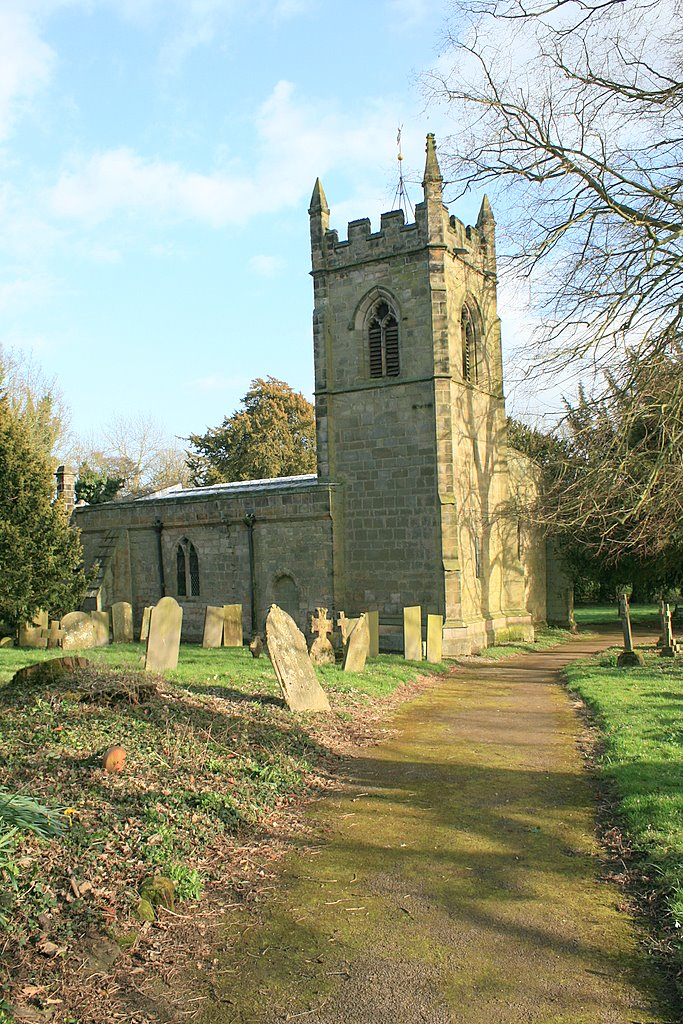
- St Andrew's Church, Radbourne

- Location within Derbyshire
- OS grid reference: SK283362
- District: South Derbyshire
- Shire county: Derbyshire
- Region: East Midlands
- Country: England
- Sovereign state: United Kingdom
- Post town: ASHBOURNE
- Postcode district: DE6
- Police: Derbyshire
- Fire: Derbyshire
- Ambulance: East Midlands

Radbourne is a small village and civil parish in the English county of Derbyshire, a few miles west of Derby. As the population of the civil parish taken at the 2011 census was less than 100 details are included in the civil parish of Etwall.

Of interest are St Andrew's Church and Radbourne Hall. It has been said that Bonnie Prince Charlie stayed one night at the hall in 1745 on his march south when his army halted at Swarkestone Bridge just south of Derby.

It would appear that Radbourne was part of the lands of the Ferrers, earls of Derby, forfeited to the Crown in the 1260s after the Baronial War, which were ultimately used to endow Edmund of Lancaster, second son of Henry III, and younger brother of Edward I. In the main the entries in The National Archives that relate to Radbourne are rather mundane, so that in the earliest one, that for 1377 (TNA DL 30/45/520, rot 14d.), John del Enese and Roger Harwode, the men who answered at the court (?tithingmen), reported that Robert Jort and William Brewode had brewed [against the assise], and were in mercy. Jort was fined 7 d., and Brewode, 3d. Further entries in the reigns of Richard II, and Henry IV and V report similar offences. In 1426 (TNA DL 30/45/568, rot. 5d.), John Robynsone and William Bearle simply stated ‘quod omnia bene’ (‘all is well’). The Poles don't make an appearance until the reign of Henry VI when in 1422, Peter de la Pole was one of those attending court for Radbourne (TNA DL 30/45/567 rot. 6d.). In 1466 during the reign of Edward IV (TNA DL 30/45/579, rot. 3d.), Ralph Pole was granted a licence to concord, in other words to execute a final concord for 12d.

The medieval knight Sir John Chandos, a close friend of Edward, the Black Prince, hailed from Radbourne in the 14th century.

Erasmus Darwin, grandfather of Charles, lived at Radbourne Hall for a short while after his marriage to Elizabeth Pole in 1781.

== See also ==
- Listed buildings in Radbourne, Derbyshire
