= Chandos (name) =

Chandos is both a surname and a given name. Notable people with the name include:

Surname:

- Fay Chandos, pen name of Irene Mossop (1904–1988), prolific British writer of children's and romance novels
- John Chandos (died 1369), medieval English knight, military strategist and close friend of Edward, the Black Prince
- John Chandos (actor) (1917–1987), British actor

Dynastic name:

- Duke of Chandos and Baron Chandos, England
- Viscount Chandos, United Kingdom

Given name:

- Chandos Blair (1919–2011), British Army General Officer Commanding Scotland
- Chandos Sydney Cedric Brudenell-Bruce (1904-1974), 7th Marquess of Ailesbury. He was known as Cedric. His father George William James Chandos Brudenell-Bruce (1873-1961), 6th Marquess of Ailesbury, was known as Chandos, and was bestowed the name in honour of Chandos Stanhope.
- Chandos Leigh, 1st Baron Leigh (1791–1850), British landowner and minor poet
- Chandos Leigh Hunt Wallace (1854–1927), English healer and writer on health, spiritualism and food reform
- Chandos Morgan (1920–1993), Chaplain of the Fleet and Archdeacon of the Royal Navy from 1972 to 1975
- Chandos Scudamore Scudamore-Stanhope (1823-1871), British naval officer after whom is named the Stanhope Medal for courageous and heroic rescue at sea
- Chandos Wren-Hoskyns (1812–1876), English landowner, agriculturist, author and Member of Parliament
