= Edward Sacheverell Chandos-Pole =

High Sheriff of Derbyshire
- In office 1827–1827
- Preceded by: Sir Roger Gresley, Bt
- Succeeded by: Sir George Sitwell, Bt

Personal details
- Born: 1 March 1792
- Died: 19 January 1863 (aged 70)
- Spouse: Anna Maria Wilmot (m. 1819; died 1863)
- Parent(s): Sacheverell Chandos-Pole; Mary Ware
- Education: Harrow School
- Alma mater: St Mary Hall, Oxford

Edward Sacheverell Chandos-Pole (1 March 1792 – 19 January 1863) was a Guards officer and High Sheriff of Derbyshire in 1827.

== Early life ==
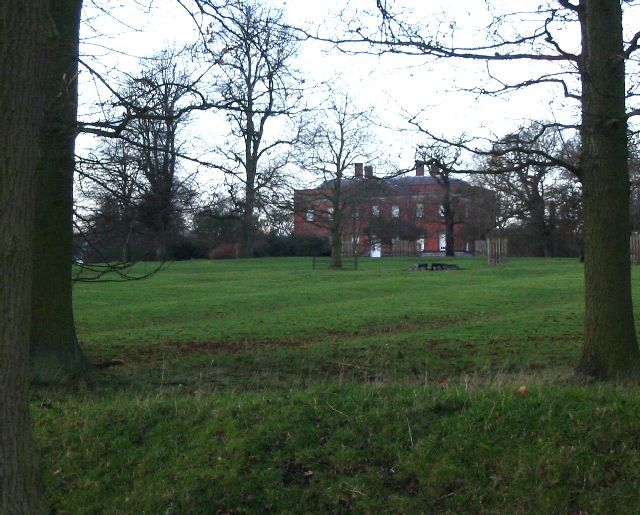
Radbourne Hall

Edward was the son of Mary Ware and Sacheverell Pole (1769–1813), who later adopted the additional surname of Chandos, in 1807. His paternal grandparents were Edward Sacheverell Pole and Elizabeth Colyear. His maternal grandparents were the Rev. Henry Ware and Anne Mundy.

He was educated at Harrow from 1813 to 1817, and matriculated at St Mary Hall, Oxford on 14 February 1817, though is not recorded as taking a degree.

== Career ==
Chandos-Pole purchased a commission in the 1st Foot Guards as an ensign on 1 May 1808, and fought in the Walcheren Campaign in 1809, and in the Peninsular War until 1813. He inherited the family property of Radbourne Hall from his father on 14 April 1813 and retired from the Army, although he did command a troop of Yeomanry Cavalry for Derbyshire. He was known in that county simply as "The Squire".

He was High Sheriff of Derbyshire in 1827, and was made a deputy lieutenant of the county in 1855.

== Personal life ==
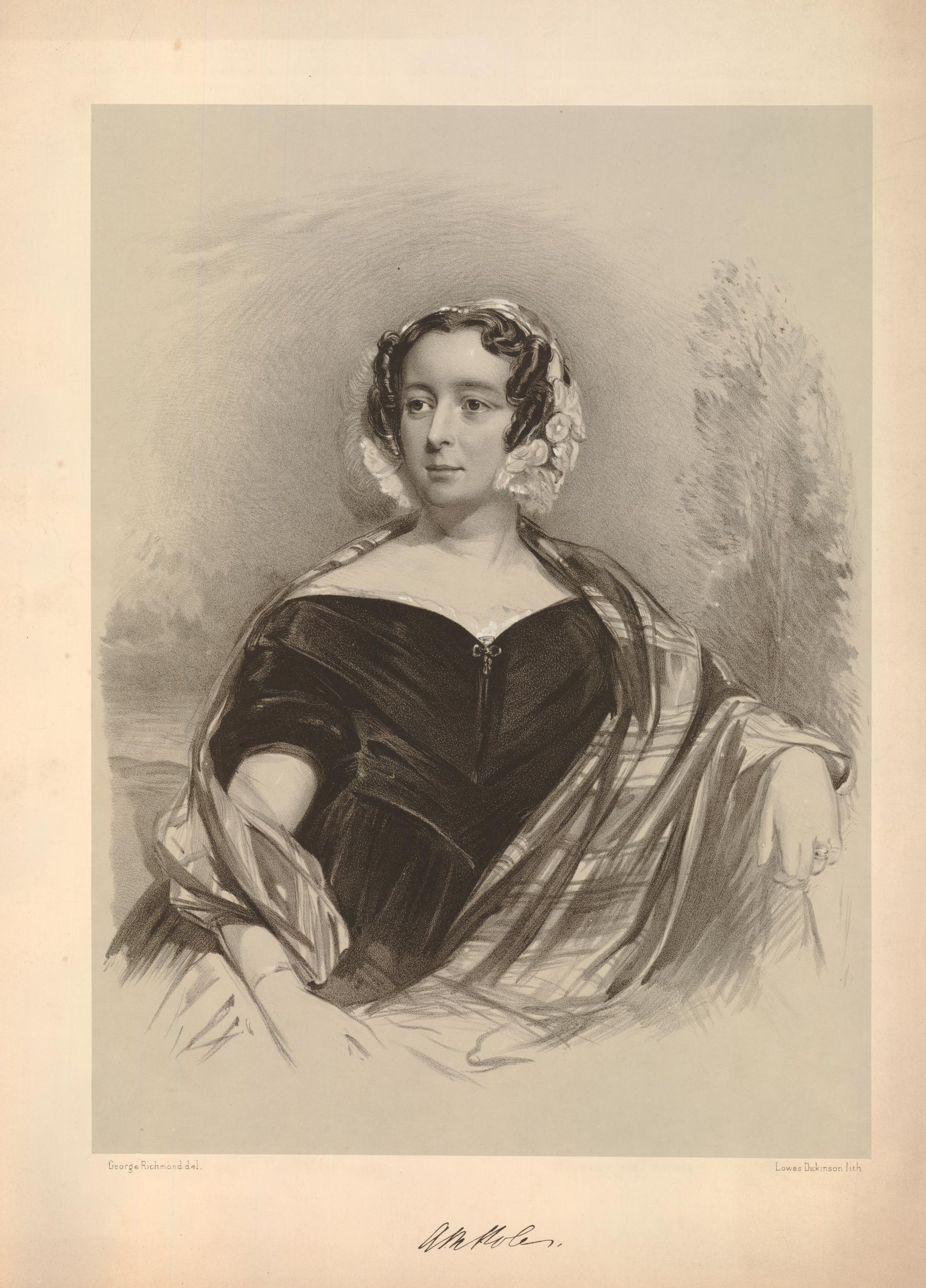
Lithograph of his wife, Anna Maria, on chine-collé, by Lowes Cato Dickinson, after a drawing by George Richmond, c. 1850

On 22 February 1819, Chandos-Pole was married to Anna Maria Wilmot (d. 1863), a daughter of Rev. Edward Sacheverel Wilmot. Together, they lived of Radbourne Hall and were the parents of the following children:

- Edward Sacheverell Chandos Pole (1826–1873), who married Lady Anna Caroline Stanhope, daughter of Leicester Stanhope, 5th Earl of Harrington and Elizabeth Williams Green, in 1850.
- Henry Chandos Pole Gell (1829–1902), who took the arms and surname Gell when he succeeded to the estate at Hopton Hall.
- Charlotte Chandos-Pole (1830–1895), who married Hon. John Yarde-Buller, son of John Yarde-Buller, 1st Baron Churston and Elizabeth Wilson Patten, in 1845.
- Eleanor Chandos-Pole (1843–1886), who married, as his second wife, Vice-Admiral Henry Bagot, son of Rt. Rev. Hon. Richard Bagot and Lady Harriet Villiers (a daughter of the 4th Earl of Jersey), in 1858.

Chandos-Pole and his wife both died on 19 January 1863.

Honorary titles
Preceded by Sir Roger Gresley, Bt	High Sheriff of Derbyshire; 1827	Succeeded by Sir George Sitwell, Bt
