= St Andrew's Church, Radbourne =

St Andrew’s Church, Radbourne
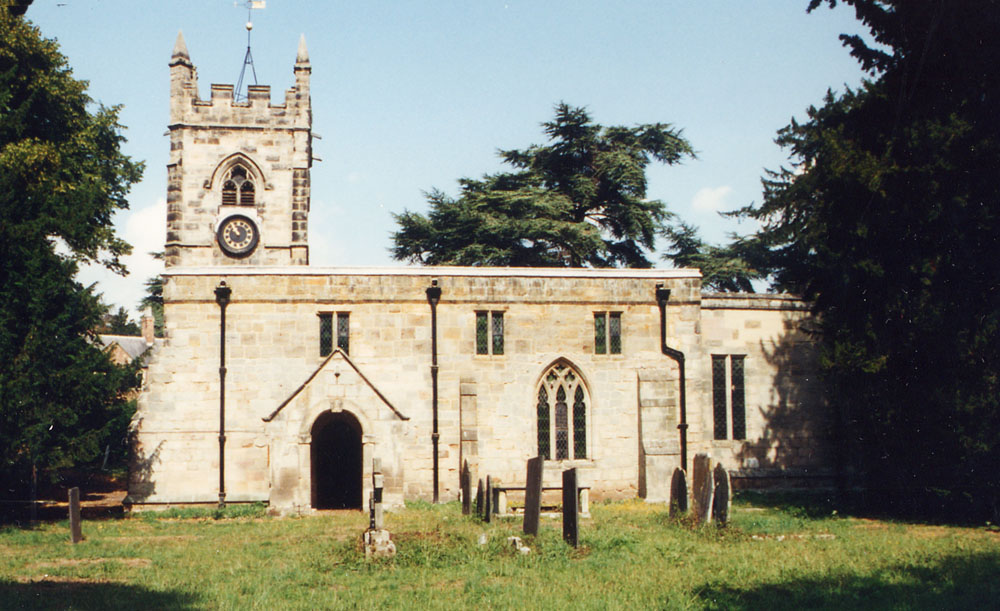
- St Andrew’s Church, Radbourne
- St Andrew’s Church, Radbourne
- 52°55′12.12″N 1°34′34.96″W
- Location: Radbourne, Derbyshire
- Country: England
- Denomination: Church of England

History
- Dedication: St Andrew

Architecture
- Heritage designation: Grade I listed

Administration
- Province: Province of York
- Diocese: Diocese of Derby
- Archdeaconry: Derby
- Deanery: Longford
- Parish: Radbourne

St Andrew's Church, Radbourne is a Grade I listed parish church in the Church of England in Radbourne, Derbyshire.

== History ==
The church dates from the 13th century, with additions in the 14th, 15th and 17th centuries. The porch was added in 1792, and the church was repaired in 1844. The tower and vestry were added in 1874.

The church contains carved bench ends dating from the 14th century which were originally in Dale Abbey.

The church has memorials to the Pole and de la Pole families including one to German Pole, MP for Derbyshire in 1656. The memorial dates from 1684 and is generally attributed to Grinling Gibbons.

== Organ ==
The organ dates from 1888 and is by Peter Conacher. A specification of the organ can be found on the National Pipe Organ Register.

== Parish status ==
The church is in a joint parish with

- All Saints Church, Mickleover,
- St John’s Church, Mickleover.

== See also ==
- Grade I listed churches in Derbyshire
- Grade I listed buildings in Derbyshire
- Listed buildings in Radbourne, Derbyshire
