= List of people from Nottingham =

List of notable people associated with Nottingham, England

This is a list of notable people with a Wikipedia page, who have been or are associated with Nottingham and district (postcodes NG1–NG16), arranged by category and date of birth. Entries are in birth order. The Oxford Dictionary of National Biography (ODNB) is pay-walled.

== Armed forces ==
- (c. 1040–1115) William Peverel, Norman knight who may have fought in the Battle of Hastings, was awarded over 50 manors in Nottinghamshire.
- (1615–1664) John Hutchinson (Colonel), parliamentary army officer and regicide, was baptised in Nottingham and probably born in his father's house at Owthorpe.
- (1679–1761) John Deane, had a long career in the Royal Navy and Russian Navy. He is noted for commanding in the capture of Gibraltar and as captain on the ill-fated trading vessel the Nottingham Galley, shipwrecked on Boon Island in 1710.
- (1795–1860) William Raynor, thought to be the oldest Victoria Cross recipient, for valour at the Siege of Delhi in 1857, was born at Plumtree, Nottinghamshire.
- (1826–1865) Francis Wheatley, awarded the Victoria Cross for valour in the Crimean War in 1854, was born in Ruddington.
- (1829–1888) Samuel Morley or Morely, awarded the Victoria Cross for valour at Nathapur, India in 1858, was born at Radcliffe-on-Trent and died in Nottingham.
- (1832–1884) Robert Humpston, awarded the Victoria Cross for valour in the Crimean War in 1855, died in Nottingham.
- (1846–1899) Anthony Clarke Booth, awarded the Victoria Cross for valour in the Anglo-Zulu War of 1879, was born in Carrington, Nottingham.
- (1873–1916) Sapper William Hackett, awarded a posthumous Victoria Cross for valour as a tunneller at Givenchy, France in 1916, was a miner from Sneinton.
- (1873–1946) Harry Churchill Beet, awarded the Victoria Cross for valour in the Second Boer War in 1900, was born in Bingham.
- (1881–1960) Samuel Harvey, awarded the Victoria Cross for valour at the Hohenzollern Redoubt, France, in 1915, was born in Basford.
- (1881–1936) Walter Richard Parker of the Royal Marines, awarded the Victoria Cross for valour at Gallipoli in 1915, died at Stapleford.
- (1888–1949) James Upton, awarded the Victoria Cross for valour at the Battle of Aubers Ridge in the First World War in 1915, was born in the Meadows, Nottingham.
- (1889–1962) Robert Bye, awarded the Victoria Cross for valour in the Third Battle of Ypres, died in Nottingham in 1962.
- (1890–1945) William Henry Johnson, awarded the Victoria Cross for valour at Ramicourt, France, in the First World War in 1918, was born at Worksop and died in Arnold.
- (1891–1973) Charles Ernest Garforth, awarded the Victoria Cross for valour at Harmingnies, France, in the First World War in 1914, died in Beeston and was cremated at Wilford Hill, Nottingham.
- (1893–1947) Wilfred Dolby Fuller, awarded the Victoria Cross for valour in the Battle of Neuve Chapelle in the First World War in 1915, was born in Greasley.
- (1894–1982) Geoffrey Vickers, awarded the Victoria Cross and the Belgian Croix de Guerre for valour at the Hohenzollern Redoubt in France in 1915, in charge of economic intelligence in the Second World War, and later a prominent management theorist, was born in Nottingham.
- (1896–1917) Albert Ball, First World War fighter pilot, was a recipient of the Victoria Cross.
- (1901–1972) Robert St Vincent Sherbrooke of the Royal Navy, awarded the Victoria Cross for valour in the Battle of the Barents Sea in 1942, was born and died at Oxton, Nottinghamshire.
- (1915–1975) Harry Nicholls, awarded the Victoria Cross for valour near the River Escaut in Belgium in 1940, was born and died in Nottingham.
- (1917–2020) Eleanor Wadsworth, Nottingham-born, who joined the RAF Spitfire Women in the Second World War
- (Born 1935) Stella Rimington, first female head of MI5, was educated at Nottingham High School for Girls.

== Arts ==
- (c. 1661–1736) Nicholas Hawksmoor, architect, was born at East Drayton.
- (1721–1798) Thomas Sandby, architect and founder member of the Royal Academy.
- (1731–1809) Paul Sandby, artist and founder member of the Royal Academy.
- (1802–1828) Richard Parkes Bonington, landscape painter, born in Arnold.
- (1815–1898) George I. Barnett, born and raised in Nottingham, became a prominent architect in St. Louis, Missouri.
- (1834–1912) Samuel Bourne, famed photographer of India, lived in Nottingham from 1870 until he died in 1912.
- (1846–1901) Kate Greenaway, illustrator of children's books, spent her childhood and many adult summers at Rolleston, Nottinghamshire.
- (1861–1944) Joseph Southall, painter and Quaker, born in Nottingham, the son of a grocer.
- (1869-1951) Robert Farquhar Train, architect, born in Nottingham
- (1877–1970) Dame Laura Knight, artist, studied in her teens and then taught at Nottingham School of Art.
- (1878–1959) Percy Claude Byron, New York photographer, was born in Nottingham.
- (1884–1944) Charles Doman, sculptor, was born in St Ann's, Nottingham.
- (1898–1964) Stella Rebecca Crofts, painter and sculptor, was born in Nottingham.
- (1907–1969) Dudley D. Watkins, cartoonist and illustrator for comics such as The Beano, The Dandy, The Beezer and Topper, was brought up in Nottingham.
- (Born 1928) Audrey Levy, artist and textile designer, was born in Nottingham
- (1939-2024) Keith Albarn, artist and father of Damon Albarn, was born in Nottingham.
- (Born 1963) Nicky Hirst, artist, was born in Nottingham.
- (Born 1964) Edmund de Waal, ceramicist and writer, author of a family memoir, The Hare with Amber Eyes: a Hidden Inheritance, was born in Nottingham.
- (Born 1964) Mat Collishaw, artist, was born in Nottingham.
- (1967–2015) Nadia Chomyn, autistic artist, was born in Nottingham.

== Business ==
- (1631–1699) Thomas Smith, either of Cropwell Butler or of East Stoke, established England's first provincial bank in Nottingham.
- (c. 1763–1834) George Africanus was a Nottingham entrepreneur of African origin.
- (1781–1868) Samuel Fox was a philanthropist, abolitionist Quaker and first chairman of Nottingham Building Society.
- (1808–1867) Mark Huish, railway manager, was born in Nottingham.
- (1850–1931) Jesse Boot, chairman and managing director of Boots the Chemists who transformed it into a national concern: the company was founded in Nottingham in 1849 by his father, (1815) John Boot.
- (1848–1921) Sir Frank Bowden, 1st Baronet spent the last 34 years of his life in Nottingham turning Raleigh into the world's largest bicycle maker.
- (Born 1946) Sir Paul Smith, fashion designer (from Beeston).
- (Born 1970) Julian Penniston-Hill is the founding CEO of the Nottingham-based investment managers Intelligent Money

== Literature ==
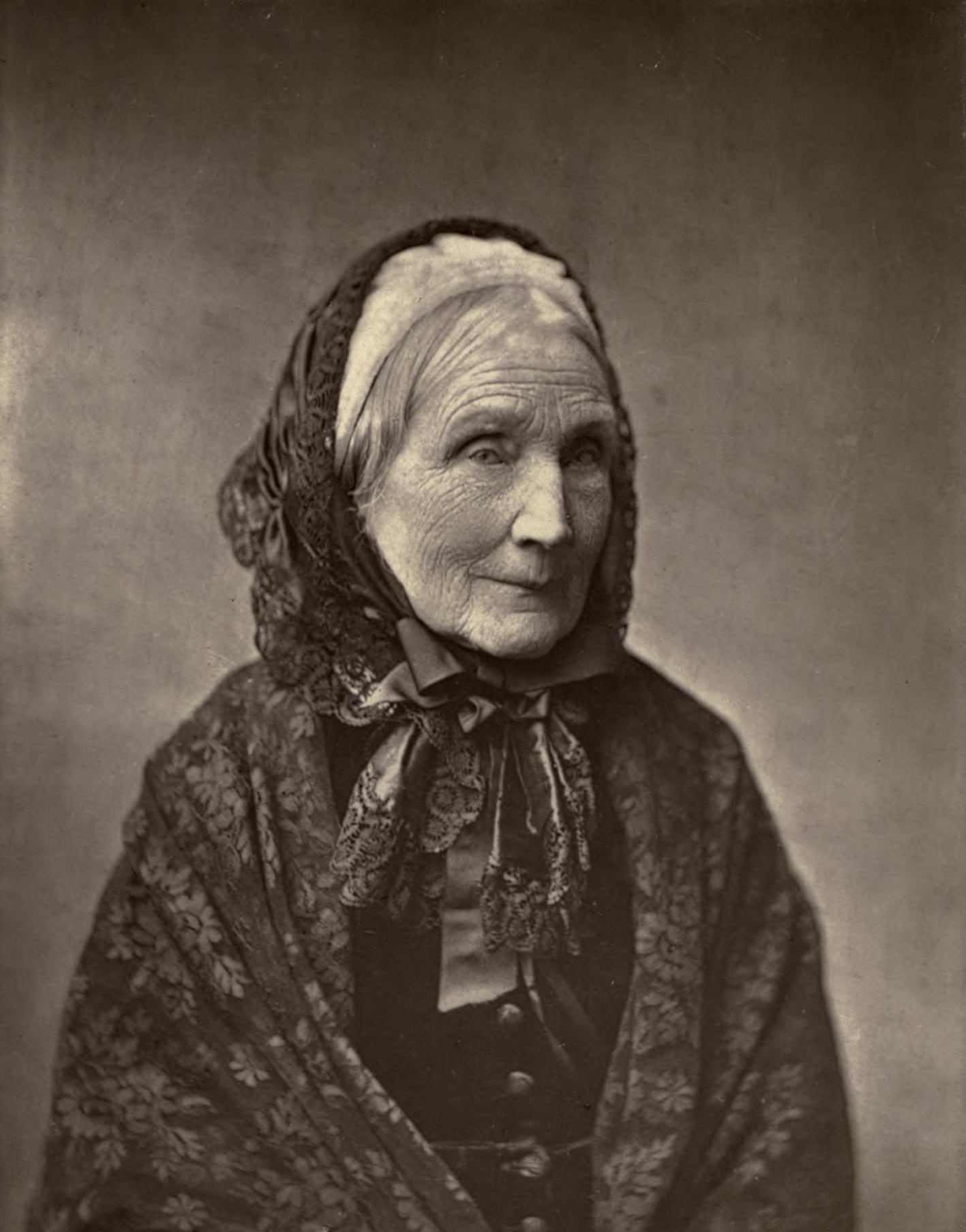
Mary Howitt, poet (1889)

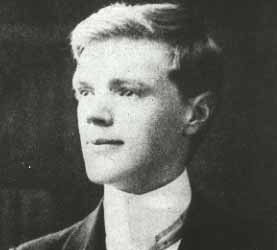
D. H. Lawrence, world famed author (1906)

- (1623–1673) Margaret Cavendish, Duchess of Newcastle-upon-Tyne, writer and aristocrat, died at Welbeck Abbey.
- (1723–1815) William Hutton, poet and historian, was a stocking maker's apprentice in Nottingham and later a bookseller in Southwell.
- (1785–1806) Henry Kirke White, religious poet, was the son of a Nottingham butcher.
- (1788–1824) Lord Byron, the poet lived at Newstead Abbey and is buried at nearby Hucknall along with Ada Lovelace, his mathematician daughter (1815–1852).
- (1788–1839) Robert Millhouse, poet, stocking weaver and bank clerk, was born in Nottingham.
- (1792–1879) William Howitt, Quaker poet and author, served as a Nottingham alderman in the 1830s.
- (1795–1869) Richard Howitt, Heanor-born poet, spent much of his life in Nottingham and died at Edingley.
- (1799–1888) Mary Howitt, Quaker poet and author, lived in Nottingham with her husband William in the 1830s.
- (1816–1902) Philip James Bailey, poet, lived with his father at 16–18 Denman Street, then moved to 449 Alfreton Road. His poem "Festus" was written in the Basford area.
- (1824–1884) Anna Mary Howitt, writer and painter, was born in Nottingham.
- (1934-2017) Raymond Buckland, writer on the subject of Wicca.
- (1835–1902) Samuel Butler, author of Erewhon, was born at Langar, Nottinghamshire.
- (1860–1937) J. M. Barrie, Scottish playwright and novelist, lived in Nottingham in 1883–1885, working as a leader writer at the Nottingham Journal.
- (1875–1943) Arthur Mee, compiler of the Children's Encyclopædia and author of the King's England series, was born in Stapleford.
- (1880–1951) Henry James Bruce, diplomat, wrote a book about his teenage years at Clifton Hall, Nottingham.
- (1885–1930) D. H. Lawrence, novelist and poet, was born in Eastwood, Nottinghamshire and educated at Nottingham High School
- (1893–1966) Dorothy Whipple, novelist and children's writer, spent her married life in Nottingham.
- (1896–1974) Hilda Lewis, historical and children's novelist, taught in Nottingham from the 1920s and died there.
- (1909–1998) Geoffrey Trease, children's novelist, Bows Against the Barons, was the son of a Nottingham wine merchant.
- (1913–1998) Joan Adeney Easdale, poet, spent the last twenty years of her life in Nottingham after suffering from severe psychosis.
- (1919–2009) Stanley Middleton, novelist, organist and painter born in Bulwell, was educated at High Pavement School and the University College of Nottingham. He taught English at High Pavement.
- (1927–2017) Paul Oliver, architectural historian and writer on the blues and other forms of African-American music, was born in Nottingham.
- (1928–2010) Alan Sillitoe, novelist (Saturday Night and Sunday Morning), born and raised in Nottingham, worked at the Raleigh factory for four years.
- (1931–1995) Janice Elliott, novelist and children's writer, was brought up in Nottingham.
- (1934–2005) Helen Cresswell, children's writer, was born in Kirkby-in-Ashfield and died at Eakring.
- (Born 1943) Vicki Feaver, poet, was born in Nottingham.
- (Born 1944) Barbara Erskine, novelist, was born in Nottingham.
- (Born 1947) Stephen Lowe, actor and playwright, was born in Nottingham.
- (Born 1948) Miranda Seymour, biographer and novelist, was brought up at Thrumpton Hall and still owns it.
- (Born 1948) Max Blagg, poet, writer and performer, was born in Retford.
- (Living) Posie Graeme-Evans, novelist and TV director, was born in Nottingham.
- (Born 1952) Stephen Booth, crime writer, lives in Retford.
- (Born 1953) Michael Bywater, writer and broadcaster, was educated at Nottingham High School.
- (Born 1957) Robert Harris, novelist and screenplay writer, was born and raised in Nottingham.
- (Born 1959) Susanna Clarke, novelist of (Jonathan Strange & Mr Norrell), was born in Nottingham, daughter of a Methodist minister.
- (Born 1960) Julie Myerson, novelist and newspaper columnist, was born in Nottingham
- (Born 1965) Keith Mansfield, writer and publisher, went to school in Nottingham and West Bridgford.
- (Born 1965) Jonathan Emmett, children's author, has lived in Nottingham since studying architecture at the University of Nottingham in the 1980s.
- (Born 1966) Thomas de Waal, journalist and writer on the Caucasus, was born in Nottingham.
- (Born 1981) Rory Waterman, poet and academic, is a senior lecturer at Nottingham Trent University.

== Music ==
- (1849–1923) Sam Torr, music-hall performer
- (1932-2004) Frank Robinson (Xylophone Man), street entertainer
- (Born 1937) John Crocker was a clarinetist and saxophonist with Chris Barber's Jazz Band until 2003.
- (1941–2014) Christopher Hogwood, conductor and harpsichordist, was born in Nottingham.
- (1942–2003) Edwin Starr, US soul music singer, died in Bramcote.
- (Born 1943) Leo Lyons, rock bass guitarist of Ten Years After, was born in Mansfield.
- (1944–2013) Alvin Lee, rock guitarist and singer, was born Graham Barnes in Nottingham.
- (Born 1944) Anne Briggs, folk singer, was born in Toton, near Beeston.
- (1945–2006) Elton Dean, jazz saxophonist, was born in Nottingham.
- (Born 1948) Stephen Brown, composer, conductor and teacher, was born in Bulwell.
- (Born 1948) Ian Paice, drummer for Deep Purple
- (Born 1950) Graham Russell, guitarist and vocalist from soft rock group Air Supply
- (Born 1952) Judith Bingham, composer and singer, was born in Nottingham.
- (Born 1958) Bruce Dickinson, lead singer of the heavy metal band Iron Maiden, was born in Worksop.
- (Born 1959) Corinne Drewery, born and bred in Nottingham, is the lead singer of the Nottingham group Swing Out Sister
- (Born 1960) Nick Hallam and (born 1961) Robert Birch, founder members of Stereo MC's.
- (1961–2022) Andy Fletcher of the synth band Depeche Mode was born in Nottingham.
- (Born 1962) Digby "Dig" Pearson is a musician and founder of Earache Records. Nottingham is its UK base.
- (Born 1965) Stuart A. Staples, guitarist and singer, notably of the band Tindersticks
- (Born 1965) Ian Campbell, AKA "ICE MC", Eurodance rapper from Hyson Green, topped the Italian charts.
- (Born 1977) Steven Price, composer and music editor who played pieces for the films Scott Pilgrim vs. the World.
- (Born 1981) Chris Urbanowicz, lead guitarist in Editors.
- (Born 1983) MistaJam, born Pete Dalton in Nottingham, is BBC Radio 1 and BBC Radio 1Xtra DJ radio presenter and TV actor.
- (Born 1985) Clare Hammond, pianist, 2016 winner of the Royal Philharmonic Society's Young Artist award, grew up in Nottingham.
- (Born c. 1985) Liam Bailey, acoustic soul musician, was born in Nottingham.
- (Founded 1985) Stereo MC's is a hip hop/electronic dance band based in Nottingham.
- (Born 1987) Indiana, singer whose single Solo Dancing charted at No. 14 on 27 April 2014, moved to Nottingham to live with her partner.
- (Born 1988) Natalie Duncan, soul/blues singer, moved to Nottingham aged three.
- (Born 1989) Sam Sweeney, folk musician
- (Born 1990) Jay McGuinness, member of the boy band The Wanted, grew up in Newark-on-Trent and Carlton.
- (Founded 1991) Tindersticks is an indie band based in Nottingham.
- (Born 1991) Bianca Claxton, musician and member of the girl group Parade, was born in Gunthorpe and educated at Nottingham High School for Girls.
- (Born 1994) Jake Bugg, singer/songwriter, is from Clifton, Nottingham.
- (Born 1995) Saint Raymond is a solo musician and songwriter from Bramcote.
- (Founded c. 1996) The Henry Road is a band from Nottingham.
- (Born 1999) Sheku Kanneh-Mason is a cellist who won the 2016 BBC Young Musician award.
- (Born 2000) Skaiwater, born Tyler Brooks in Nottingham, is a rapper, singer and producer.
- (Founded 2006) Sleaford Mods is a Nottingham-based punk duo. Jason Williamson of the duo lives in West Bridgford.
- (Founded 2008) Dog Is Dead is a five-piece indie band from West Bridgford.
- (Founded 2009) London Grammar, a trip-hop band formed in Nottingham while members attended the University of Nottingham

== Politics ==
- (c. 1090 – post-1155) William Peverel the Younger, courtier and landowner, was born in Nottingham.
- (1122–1204) Eleanor of Aquitaine, consort of Henry II of England, was imprisoned in Nottingham Castle in 1173–1189 after plotting against him.
- (1546–1615) Sir Henry Pierrepont of Holme Pierrepont was a member of Parliament for Nottingham.
- (1584–1643) Robert Pierrepont, 1st Earl of Kingston-upon-Hull of Holme Pierrepont was a member of Parliament for Nottingham, then active in the House of Lords from 1627, but neutral in the English Civil War.
- (1607–1680) Henry Pierrepont, 1st Marquess of Dorchester, of Holme Pierrepont was a prominent Royalist politician and a scholar.
- (1607/1608–1678) William Pierrepont, born at Holme Pierrepont, was a prominent parliamentary politician under the Commonwealth.
- (1622–1670) Gilbert Mabbot, newsbook writer during the English Civil War, was the son of a Nottingham cobbler and baptised in St Mary's Church, Nottingham.
- (1667–1726) Evelyn Pierrepont, 1st Duke of Kingston-upon-Hull was a Whig politician and from 1707 recorder of Nottingham.
- (1737–1816) Charles Pierrepont, 1st Earl Manvers, politician, MP for Nottinghamshire, and naval officer, inherited Thoresby Hall and Holme Pierrepont Hall in 1788.
- (1740–1824) John Cartwright, political reformer, was born in Marnham.
- (1790–1817) Jeremiah Brandreth, revolutionary, born in Wilford
- (1825–1897) Anthony John Mundella, who went into the Nottingham hosiery trade in 1837, was an MP and a minister in three Liberal governments.
- (1826–1900) Sydney Pierrepont, 3rd Earl Manvers, politician, MP for Nottinghamshire, was born at Holme Pierrepont.
- (1854–1926) Charles Pierrepont, 4th Earl Manvers, politician, was MP for the Newark Division of Nottinghamshire.
- (1855–1939) Alice Zimmern, suffragist and pacifist, was the daughter of a lace merchant.
- (1878–1952) Marian Cripps, Baroness Parmoor, was anti-war activist born in Nottingham.
- (1881–1955) Gervas Pierrepont, 6th Earl Manvers, army officer and politician, was buried at Perlethorpe.
- (1893–1977) William Cavendish-Bentinck, 7th Duke of Portland, Conservative politician and chancellor of the University of Nottingham, lived at Welbeck Abbey.
- (1907–1977) Ruth Adam, feminist, was born in Arnold and worked as a schoolteacher.
- (1913–1997) Hugh Lawson, Common Wealth MP for Skipton (1943–1945), grew up in Nottingham and attended Nottingham High School and Nottingham University College, before holding local-government positions, latterly Director of Leisure Services for Nottinghamshire.
- (1926–2013) Oswald George Powe Jamaican-born, left-wing political activist, equity activist, Labour Party local councilor.
- (1930–2010) Ken Coates, left-wing trade-union activist, academic and politician, MEP for East Midlands (1989–99), lived and worked in Nottingham as a sociology student, lecturer in adult education at the University of Nottingham, and director of the Bertrand Russell Peace Foundation.
- (1932-2021) Jim Lester, Conservative MP for Beeston, then Broxtowe, and a junior minister, was born in Nottingham and educated at Nottingham High School.
- (Born 1940) Kenneth Clarke, Chancellor of the Exchequer (1993–1997) and MP for Rushcliffe until 2019, was educated at Nottingham High School.
- (Born 1953) Geoff Hoon, Secretary of State for Defence (1999–2005), Secretary of State for Transport 2008–2009 and MP for Ashfield (1992–2010), was educated at Nottingham High School.
- (Born 1965) Ed Davey, a politician serving as acting co-Leader of the Liberal Democrats since 13 December 2019, and the Member of Parliament (MP) for Kingston and Surbiton, was born in Mansfield, Nottinghamshire.
- (Born 1967) Ed Balls, Shadow Chancellor of the Exchequer (2011–2015) and previously MP for Morley and Outwood, grew up in Keyworth and attended Nottingham High School.
- (Born 1972) Dan Jarvis, Member of Parliament (MP) for Barnsley Central, and Mayor of the Sheffield City Region, was born in Nottingham.
- (Born 1996) Nadia Whittome is the Member of Parliament (MP) for Nottingham East. She was born in Nottingham.

== Religion ==
- (c. 1340/1345–1396) Walter Hilton, mystic and author of The Ladder of Perfection, was a canon of Thurgarton Priory and died there in 1396.
- (1489–1546) Thomas Cranmer, archbishop and martyr, was born at Aslockton, Nottinghamshire.
- (c. 1550–1616) Thomas Helwys, co-founder of the Baptist denomination and victim of religious persecution, has a Lenton, Nottingham Baptist church named after him.
- (1549/1550–1610) Gervase Babington, Anglican theologian and Bishop of Worcester, was born in Nottinghamshire.
- (1568–1644) William Brewster, postmaster of Scrooby, sailed as one of the Pilgrim Fathers on the Mayflower to Plymouth Colony.
- (c. 1562 – post-1606) John Darrell, exorcist and Puritan, was appointed curate of St Mary's Church, Nottingham in 1597, having earlier lived at Bulwell.
- (c. 1600–1672) Elizabeth Hooton, first female Quaker preacher, lived at Skegby.
- (1631–1713) John Barret, Presbyterian minister, was born and died in Nottingham.
- (1738–1816) Daniel Taylor, founder of New Connexion of General Baptists, was baptised in the River Idle at Gamston, Bassetlaw.
- (1762–1835) Luke Booker, cleric, poet and antiquary
- (1779–1852) Joseph Gilbert, Congregational writer and minister in Friar Lane, Nottingham.
- (1781–1868) Samuel Fox, Quaker philanthropist, was from Nottingham.
- (1800–1878) William Williams, missionary in New Zealand, and first Anglican Bishop of Waiapu, was born in Nottingham.
- (1829–1912) William Booth, founder of The Salvation Army, was born in Sneinton.
- (1847–1913) Mary Potter, Catholic nun, founder of the religious order of The Little Company of Mary, established its first convent in Hyson Green. She was proclaimed Venerable by Pope John Paul II in 1988, and her body was returned to Nottingham Cathedral from Rome in 1997.
- (1860–1950) Herbert Kelly, Anglican priest, moved his Society of the Sacred Mission to Kelham Hall in 1903.
- (1878–1938) Constance Adelaide Smith, who revived the Anglican feast of Mothering Sunday, died in Nottingham in 1938.
- (1886–1952) Arthur Pink, U.S. evangelist and religious writer, was born in Nottingham.
- (born 1929) Victor Alexander de Waal, cleric, religious writer and later dean of Canterbury, was chaplain of the University of Nottingham in 1963–1969.
- (born 1954) Stephen Need, former Dean of St. George's College, Jerusalem, was born in Nottingham.

== Technology and scholarship ==
- (1563–1614) William Lee, inventor of the stocking frame, was born in Calverton, Nottinghamshire.
- (1670–1735) Cassandra Willoughby, Duchess of Chandos, historian and travel writer, moved aged 17 to Wollaton Hall with her brother after disagreements with their stepfather.
- (1724–1816) Robert Darwin, botanist, brother of Erasmus, was born at Elston Hall, Nottinghamshire.
- (1731–1802) Erasmus Darwin, physician and natural philosopher, was born at Elston Hall.
- (1785–1852) Gravener Henson, Nottingham workers' leader and historian of the framework knitters, was born in Nottingham.
- (1793–1841) George Green (of Green's Mill), mathematician and physicist, famed for Green's theorem, was born in Sneinton.
- (1800–1873) Godfrey Howitt, physician, botanist and entomologist, was educated in Mansfield and an honorary physician at Nottingham's City Infirmary and General Hospital before emigrating to Australia.
- (1807–1893) Thomas Hawksley, civil engineer responsible for major water and sanitary improvements in Nottingham and other parts of the United Kingdom, was born in Arnold.
- (1810–1897) E. Cobham Brewer, compiler of Brewer's Dictionary of Phrase and Fable, died at Edwinstowe on 6 March 1897.
- (1823–1895) John Russell Hind, astronomer and discoverer of several asteroids, was born in Nottingham and attended Nottingham High School.
- (1830–1901) Richard Copley Christie, lawyer and academic, was born in Lenton, Nottingham.
- (1863–1949) Frederick Kipping, noted research chemist, was professor of chemistry at University College, Nottingham in 1897–1936.
- (1866–1923) George Herbert, 5th Earl of Carnarvon, who backed the excavation of Tutankhamun's Tomb, had estates at Shelford, Nottinghamshire.
- (fl. 1895) Frederick Gibson Garton was a Nottingham grocer, who created HP Sauce in 1896.
- (1910–2007) John Pilkington Hudson, horticulturist and bomb-disposal expert, was Nottingham University's first professor of horticulture from 1958.
- (1923–2003) Geoffrey Kirk, classical scholar, was born and bred in Nottingham.
- (1933–2017) Peter Mansfield, Nobel Prize-winning physicist, had been a professor at the University of Nottingham since 1964.
- (1934–2009) Clive Granger, Nobel Prize–winning economist, studied and taught at the University of Nottingham.
- (Born 1943) Geoffrey Parker, scholar of military history and early modern Spain, was born in Nottingham and educated at Nottingham High School.
- (1946–2012) Viacheslav Belavkin, a pioneer of quantum probability, was a mathematics professor at the University of Nottingham.
- (Born 1995) Arun Maini, better known as Mrwhosetheboss, is an English YouTuber from Nottingham. He creates technology-focused content and has amassed over 20 million subscribers as of November 2024.

== Sport ==
=== Boxing ===
- (1811–1880) William Abednego Thompson, bare-knuckle boxer, was born in Sneinton.
- (1815–1861) Ben Caunt, bare-knuckle boxer, was born in Hucknall Torkard.
- (1944–2002) Bartley Gorman, bare-knuckle boxer, was born in Nottingham. Self styled "King of the Gypsies" and relative of Tyson Fury
- (1951–2008) Dave Needham, 1970 Commonwealth Games gold medallist and former British flyweight and bantamweight champion, was born in Nottingham and attended Cottesmore School.
- (Born 1970) Jawaid Khaliq, professional boxer, was born in Nottingham. His first professional fight was in 1997 and went on to be IBO welterweight title
- (Born 1977) Carl Froch, professional boxer, was born in Nottingham. Former four-time super-middleweight world champion
- (Born 1977) Jason Booth, professional boxer, was born in Nottingham. Former IBO super-flyweight champion
- (Born 1980) Nicky Booth, professional boxer, was born in Nottingham. Former British, and Commonwealth bantamweight champion
- (Born 1988) Leigh Wood, professional boxer, was born in Gedling. Current Commonwealth featherweight champion

=== Cricket ===
- (1807–1883) John Brown, was a player for Players of Nottinghamshire.
- (1812–1880) John Bradshaw, first-class cricketer, died in Granby, Nottinghamshire, where he had been Vicar since 1845.
- (fl. 1820s) Thomas Foster, first-class cricketer with Nottingham Cricket Club (1827–1828), was reportedly born in Bingham, Nottinghamshire.
- (1835–1900) Richard Daft was a player for Nottinghamshire County Cricket Club.
- (1848–1933) Philip Miles, first-class cricketer (Nottinghamshire), was born in Bingham.
- (1849–1894) John Selby, professional cricket player for Nottinghamshire
- (Born 1862) John Brown, first-class cricketer (Nottinghamshire) was born in Bingham.
- (1864–1938) Albert Widdowson, first-class cricketer (Derbyshire), was born in Bingham.
- (1904–1995) Harold Larwood, professional for Nottinghamshire and England
- (1912–1986) Stafford Castledine, first-class cricketer (Nottinghamshire), was born in Bingham.
- (1920–2013) Reg Simpson, player for Nottinghamshire and England
- (Born 1930) Alan Armitage, player for Nottinghamshire and Oxford University Cricket Club
- (Born 1934) Peter Wynne-Thomas, Retford-born cricket writer, historian, and librarian of Nottinghamshire CCC
- (Born 1935) Rex Collinge, player for Combined Services, was born in Nottingham.
- (1935–2018) Geoffrey Huskinson, first-class cricketer, was born in Langar, Nottinghamshire.
- (Born 1947) Peter Plummer, player for Nottinghamshire
- Jonathan Stenner (born 1966), first-class cricketer and gastroenterologist, was born in Bingham.
- (Born 1968) John Trueman, player for Derbyshire County Cricket Club, was born in Nottingham.
- (Born 1972) Simon Neal, former cricketer, born in Nottingham.
- (Born 1982) Mark Dale, player for Northumberland County Cricket Club, was born in Nottingham.
- (Born 1986) Mark Bott, county and international player, was born in Nottingham.
- (Born 1986) Stuart Broad, player for Nottinghamshire and England
- (Born 1989) Dan Wheeldon, player for the Unicorns, was born in Nottingham.

=== Association football ===
- (1870–1916) Herbert Kilpin, founder and player for AC Milan, was born in Nottingham.
- (1870–1949) Harry Walkerdine, footballer, born in Nottingham.
- (1928–1990) Peter Taylor, manager of Burton Albion, Brighton & Hove Albion and Derby County, was born in Nottingham. More famous as Brian Clough's number two at Hartlepools United, Derby County and Nottingham Forest
- (1942–2002) Jeff Astle, player for West Bromwich Albion, was born at Eastwood, Nottingham.
- (Born 1944) Henry Newton, Nottingham Forest, Everton and Derby County player
- (Born 1945) David Pleat, Nottingham Forest player and manager of Tottenham Hotspur, Sheffield Wednesday and Luton Town.
- (Born 1956) Viv Anderson, first Black player for England, having 30 caps and scoring two goals, also played for Nottingham Forest, Arsenal and Manchester United.
- (Born 1962) Steve Hodge, Nottingham Forest, Tottenham Hotspur, Leeds United, Aston Villa, Queens Park Rangers, Leyton Orient and England player.
- (Born 1963) Nigel Pearson, former Sheffield Wednesday and Middlesbrough defender, was born in Nottingham. He also managed Southampton, Leicester City, Hull City, Derby County and Watford
- (Born 1968) Steve Chettle, Nottingham Forest defender and captain
- (Born 1968) Marco Gabbiadini, Sunderland and Derby County goal scorer, was born in Nottingham.
- (Born 1971) Andy Cole, member of Manchester United's multi trophy-winning side of late 1990s, was born in Nottingham.
- (Born 1973) Michael Johnson, Birmingham City, Derby County and Jamaica international footballer, was born in Nottingham.
- (Born 1973) Chris Sutton, Chelsea, Norwich City, Blackburn Rovers, Celtic and Aston Villa player, was born in Nottingham.
- (Born 1976) Darren Huckerby, Coventry City and Manchester City striker, was born in Nottingham.
- (Born 1983) Jermaine Jenas, midfielder for Tottenham Hotspur and Nottingham Forest
- (Born 1983) Jermaine Pennant, right-winger for Stoke City, previously playing for Notts County, Arsenal, Watford, Leeds United, Birmingham City, Liverpool, Portsmouth and Real Zaragoza.
- (Born 1984) Julian Bennett, Sheffield Wednesday, was born in Nottingham.
- (Born 1984) Wes Morgan, Leicester City, Nottingham Forest.
- (Born 1985) Simon Francis, AFC Bournemouth, Sheffield United and Charlton Athletic, was born in Nottingham.
- (Born 1985) Craig Westcarr, played for Chesterfield FC, Nottingham Forest and Notts County FC
- (Born 1986) Leon Best, Blackburn Rovers striker, was born in Nottingham.
- (Born 1986) Tom Huddlestone, Tottenham Hotspur and Nottingham Forest youth
- (Born 1986) Will Hoskins, Brighton & Hove Albion and Bristol Rovers, was born in Nottingham.
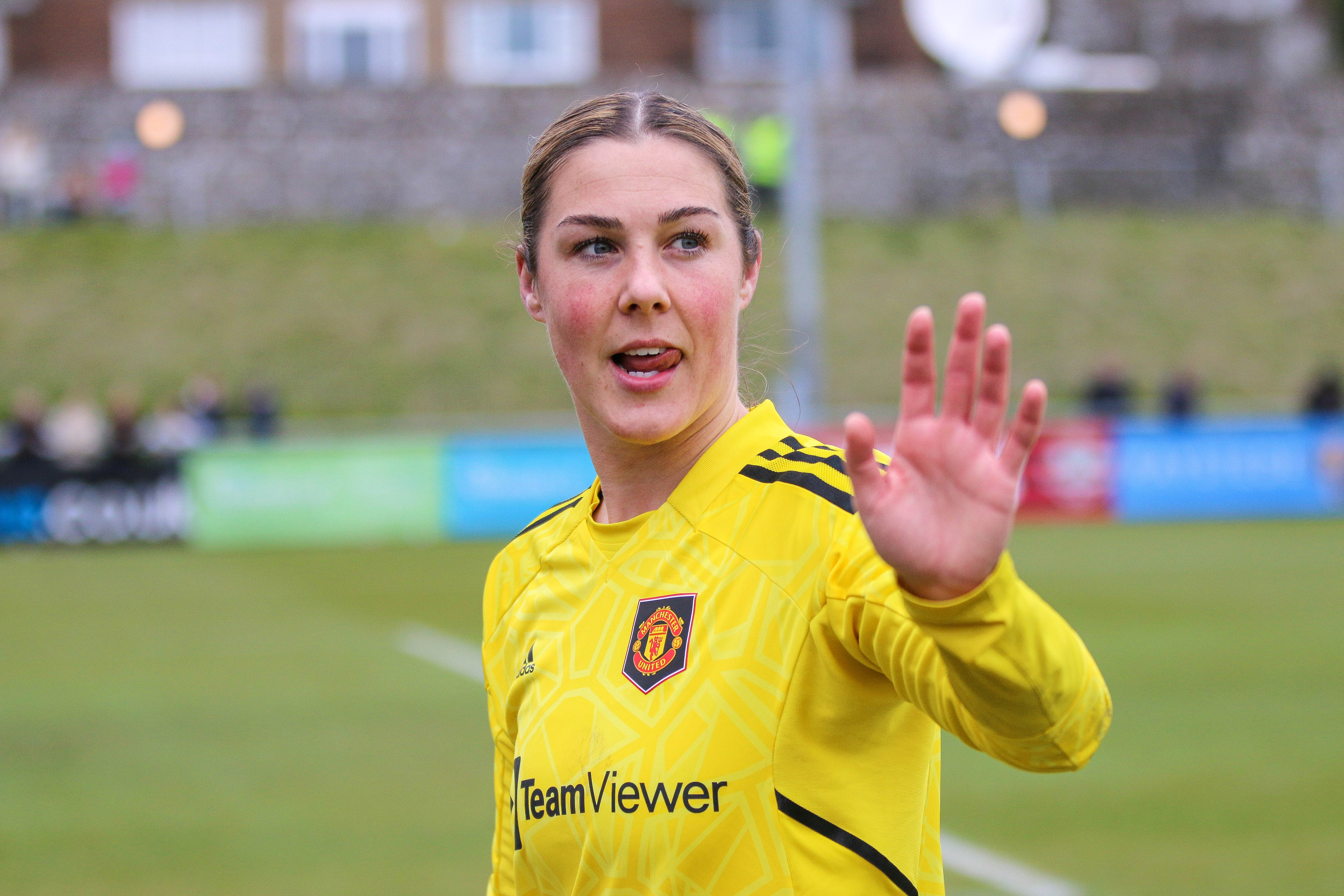
- Mary Earps, goalkeeper for the England national football team
  (Born 1986) Chris O'Grady, Leicester City, Rotherham United, Sheffield Wednesday and Nottingham Forest striker
- (Born 1987) David McGoldrick, player for Sheffield United, was born in Nottingham.
- (Born 1988) Lewis McGugan, Nottingham Forest and England Youth
- (Born 1988) Scott Loach, Rotherham United and England U21 goalkeeper, was born in Nottingham.
- (Born 1989) Sophie Bradley, Notts County and England defender
- (Born 1991) Tendayi Darikwa, Burnley, Nottingham Forest and Zimbabwe footballer
- (Born 1993) Mary Earps, goalkeeper for Manchester United and the England team
- (Born 1997) Joe Worrall, Nottingham Forest defender
- (Born 1998) Kiernan Dewsbury-Hall, Leicester City midfielder, was born in Nottingham.
- (Born 2001) Brennan Johnson Nottingham Forest winger, was born in Nottingham.
- (Born 2003) Leo Hjelde, Sunderland AFC defender, was born in Nottingham

=== Gymnastics ===
- (Born 1992) Becky Downie, gymnast at the Commonwealth Games, European Championships and 2008 and 2016 Olympics, 2015 World bronze medallist, was born in Nottingham.
- (Born 1993) Sam Oldham, gymnast, member of GB bronze medal-winning team, 2012 Olympics, was born in Keyworth.
- (Born 1994) Niamh Rippin, gymnast, London 2012 reserve, was born in Nottingham.
- (Born 1999) Ellie Downie, gymnast, sister of Becky Downie, multiple medallist at Youth Olympic Games, 2014 Junior European champion on vault, 2015 World bronze medallist, European all=round champion, 2016 Olympian, was born in Nottingham.

=== Martial arts ===
- (Born 1982) Dan Hardy, MMA fighter in UFC, was born in Nottingham.
- (Born 1983) Paul Daley, MMA fighter in Bellator, was born in Nottingham.

=== Other sports ===
- (1896–1933) Tim Birkin, racing driver, was born in Basford.
- (1905–1927) Archie Birkin, motorcycle racer, was born in Nottingham.
- (1912–1994) Archibald Stinchcombe, ice hockey player, became coach to Nottingham Panthers in 1949 and lived in the city until he died in 1994.
- (1914–1955) Tom Blower, swimmer, was born in Hyson Green.
- (Born 1941) Doug Scott, mountaineer, was raised in Nottingham.
- (Born 1957) Jayne Torvill and (born 1958) Christopher Dean, Olympic ice skating gold medallists, were born respectively in Clifton, Nottinghamshire, and Calverton.
- (Born 1969) Bryan Steel professional racing cyclist, Olympic and World Championships medallist, was born in Nottingham.
- (Born 1970) Phil Crampton, alpinist and high-altitude mountaineer, was born in Nottingham.
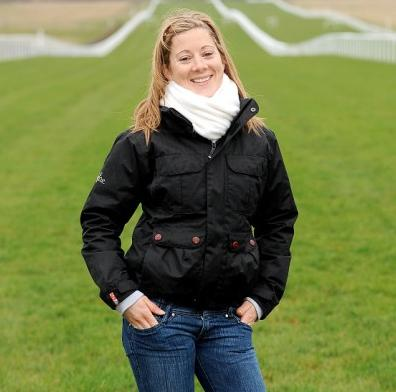
  Hayley Turner, jockey
- (Born 1971) Anthony Hamilton (snooker player), was born in Nottingham. and (1978) Michael Holt, professional snooker players who both competed in the Nazareth House Snooker League, established in Nottingham in 1940.
- (Born 1973) Elizabeth Arnold, British Olympic swimmer in 1992, was born in Nottingham.
- (Born 1973) Lee Westwood, professional golfer ranked number 1 in October 2010, was born in Worksop.
- (Born 1981) Robert Newton, hurdling athlete, born in Nottingham, is Britain's only openly gay athlete.
- (Born 1981) Helen Richardson-Walsh, England and Great Britain hockey player, multiple Olympic medallist, EuroHockey Nations champion and Champions challenge winner, grew up in West Bridgford.
- (Born 1983) Hayley Turner, top female horse-racing jockey of all time, was born near Nottingham.
- (Born 1984) Andrew Hadfield, canoe slalomist, was born in Worksop.
- (Born 1989) Rebecca Adlington, freestyle swimmer, Olympic and world champion and world record holder, was born in Mansfield.
- (Born 1994) Jodie Alderson-Smith, Great Britain ice hockey player, was born in Nottingham.
- (Born 1995) Luke Bambridge, tennis player, was born in Nottingham.
- (Born 2004) Jack Hopkins, Great Britain ice hockey player, was born in Nottingham.

== Stage, broadcasting, and film ==
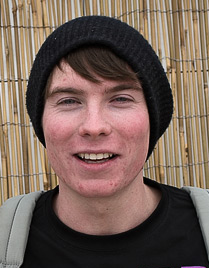
Joe Dempsie

- (1650–1687) Nell Gwyn ("Let not poor Nelly starve") was granted the estate of Bestwood by King Charles II.
- (1842–1906) Constance Loseby, stage actress and singer in Gilbert and Sullivan, was born in Nottingham.
- (1870–1903) Katie Seymour, burlesque and vaudeville entertainer, was born in Nottingham.
- (1900–1975) Lester Matthews, film actor, was born in Nottingham.
- (1919–2024) June Spencer, actress best known for her work in the soap opera The Archers on BBC Radio 4, was born in Nottingham.
- (1925–1999) Ivor Roberts, TV actor and announcer, was born in Nottingham.
- (1931–2011) Roy Skelton, actor, best known for the voices of Zippy and George from children's television programme Rainbow, and The Daleks, Dr Who, was born in Nottingham.
- (1933–1996) Leslie Crowther, comedian, actor and game show host, was born in West Bridgford.
- (1933–1996) Dennis McCarthy, radio presenter, notably with Radio Nottingham.
- (1935-2024) Michael Jayston, actor, best known for playing Nicholas II of Russia in Nicholas and Alexandra, and the Valeyard in the Doctor Who serial The Trial of a Time Lord, was born in West Bridgford.
- (1936-2022) John Bird, actor, comedian and satirist best known for Bremner, Bird and Fortune, was born in Bulwell.
- (1939–2013) Ray Gosling, radio and TV writer and broadcaster, and gay activist, lived in Nottingham for much of his life.
- (1947–1979) Richard Beckinsale, actor best known as Lennie Godber in the sitcom Porridge, was born in Beeston.
- (Born 1949) Su Pollard, actor best known for her roles in the sitcom Hi-de-Hi! and You Rang, M'Lord? was born in Nottingham.
- (Born 1950) Sherrie Hewson, actor and novelist best known as regular panellist on Loose Women, was born in Nottingham.
- (Born 1952) Cherie Lunghi, film and TV actress, was born in Nottingham.
- (Born 1958) Alison Snowden, voice actress, producer, and screenwriter, born in Arnold.
- (Born 1965) Lennie James, actor best known for roles in The Walking Dead and Critical, was born in Nottingham.
- (Born 1970) Justine Thornton, actress best known for roles in Dramarama and Hardwicke House, was brought up in Nottingham. She later married the Labour Party leader Ed Miliband.
- (Born 1970) Ace Bhatti, actor best known as Yusef Khan on EastEnders, was born in Nottingham.
- (Born 1972) Natalie Hallam, actress who starred in Dark Knight and Harry Potter and the Goblet of Fire, was born in Nottingham.
- (Born 1973) Lucy Worsley, a British historian, author, curator, and television presenter.
- (Born 1975) Andrea Lowe, actress best known for roles in Coronation Street, The Tudors and Ken Loach film Route Irish, was born in Arnold.
- (Born 1976) Craig Robert Young, actor best known for his role in Dream Team, was born in Nottingham.
- (Born 1977) Samantha Morton, actor best known for her role in the film Sweet and Lowdown, was born in Nottingham.
- (Born 1978) Mathew Horne, actor best known as Gavin in Gavin & Stacey, was born in Nottingham.
- (Born 1978) Danielle Ward, comedian and writer, grew up in Nottingham.
- (Born 1979 or 1980) Kate Oates, television producer, was born in Nottingham.
- (Born 1982) Matt Forde, comedian and radio presenter, was born in Nottingham.
- (Born 1983) Sophia Di Martino actress in TV series including Flowers and Friday Night Dinner, was born in Attenborough, Nottinghamshire.
- (Born 1983) Vicky McClure, BAFTA award-winning actress best known as Lol in This Is England, was born in Nottingham.
- (Born 1984) Tala Gouveia, actress best known as DCI Lauren McDonald in ITV's McDonald and Dodds
- (Born 1984) Arsher Ali, actor born in Basford, who starred in the film Four Lions
- (Born 1985) Jonny Sweet, actor and comedian who played Boris Johnson in When Boris Met Dave, was born in Nottingham.
- (Born 1986) Alice Levine, DJ and broadcaster, was born in Nottingham.
- (Born 1987) Joe Dempsie, actor best known as Chris Miles from Skins, grew up in West Bridgford.
- (Born 1990) Aisling Loftus, actress best known as Agnes Towler in Mr Selfridge, was born in Nottingham.
- (Born 1990) Anjli Mohindra, actress best known as Rani Chandra in The Sarah Jane Adventures, was born in West Bridgford.
- (Born 1992) Georgia Groome, actress, best known from the movie Angus, Thongs and Perfect Snogging in the main role of Georgia, was born in Nottingham.
- (Born 1999) Oscar Kennedy, actor, best known for the television series Ladhood, was born in Nottingham.
- (Born 1999) Bonnie Blue, adult film star, best known for sleeping with 1057 men on one day. Born in Stapleford, Nottinghamshire.
- (Born 2003) Bella Ramsey, actor known for their work in Game of Thrones, The Worst Witch, and The Last of Us, was born in Nottingham.
- (Born 2004) Thomas Simons (known as TommyInnit online), a Twitch streamer and YouTuber best known for his Minecraft content, was born in Nottingham.
- (Born 2001) Rosie Bentham, actor who plays Gabby Thomas in Emmerdale

== Miscellaneous ==
- (1924–2013) Mary Joynson, director of Barnardo's from 1973 to 1984, was born in Bingham.
- (Born 1944) Margaret Humphreys, social worker and Director of the Child Migrants Trust, was born and bred in Nottingham.
- (1946–2004) Harold Shipman, physician and serial killer, was born in Nottingham.
- (Born 1969) Norma Gregory, author, historian, archivist, broadcaster and diverse heritage specialist.
- (Born 1987) Paris Lees, journalist, presenter and transgender rights activist, was born in Hucknall.
- (Born 1989) Jessica Linley, representing Nottingham, became Miss England 2010.
