= Julian Hill =

Julian Hill may refer to:

- Julian Hill (fl. 1900), American landowner, namesake of Julian, West Virginia
- Julian W. Hill (1904–1996), American chemist
- Julian Hill (politician) (born 1973), Australian politician
- Julian Hill (American football) (born 2000), American football player

== See also ==
- Julien Hill (1877–1943), American football coach
- Julian Penniston-Hill (born 1970), British businessman
