= List of Manchester United W.F.C. players =

Manchester United WFC players

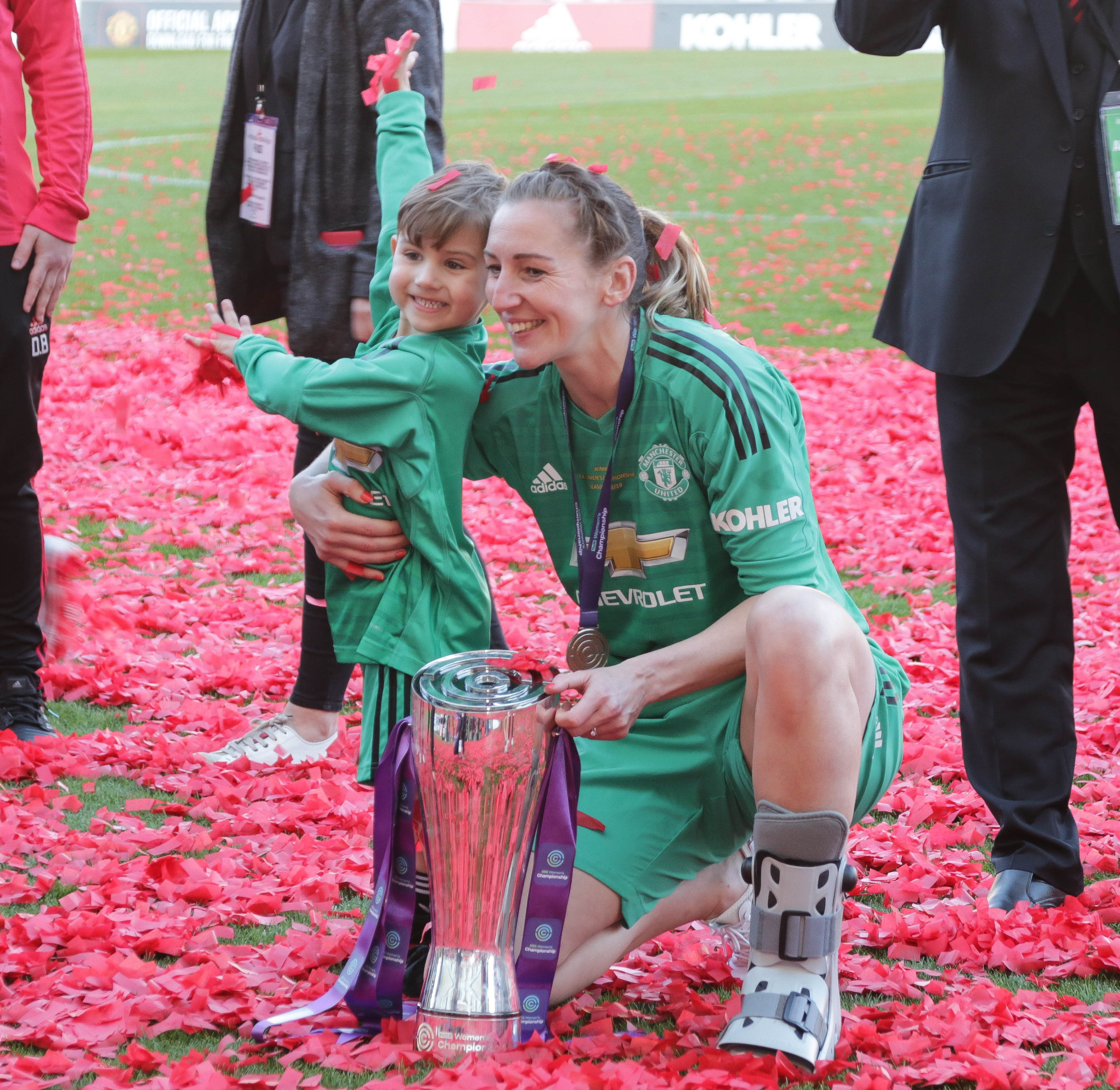
Siobhan Chamberlain was keeper in the club's first match since refoundation.

Manchester United Women Football Club is an English association football club based in Old Trafford, Greater Manchester. The club is the women's section of Manchester United Football Club. Manchester United was formed in Newton Heath in 1878 as Newton Heath LYR F.C., and played their first competitive match in October 1886, when they entered the first round of the 1886–87 FA Cup. The club was renamed Manchester United F.C. in 1902, and they moved to Old Trafford in 1910. The women's section was founded in 2018, playing its first competitive match in August 2018, a 1–0 win over Liverpool in the 2018–19 FA Women's League Cup.

Previously, Manchester United were associated with a semi-professional women supporter's football club. The club was dissolved in 2005, after Malcolm Glazer's takeover of Manchester United, with the club wishing to focus on its women's academy levels. A media spokesman for Manchester United also claimed the club wanted to focus on its women's academy instead of its senior team.

As of 22 November 2026, a total of 88 players have made a competitive first-team appearance for the club; of these, 28 players are currently under contract with Manchester United. The most recent player to make their debut for the club is English defender Lucy Newell who debuted on 30 September 2026 in the 2026–27 WSL Players Cup match against Durham. The player who has made the most appearances for Manchester United is English forward Ella Toone; she has made 226 appearances. Toone has also scored the most goals for the club, scoring 66 times.

== List of players ==
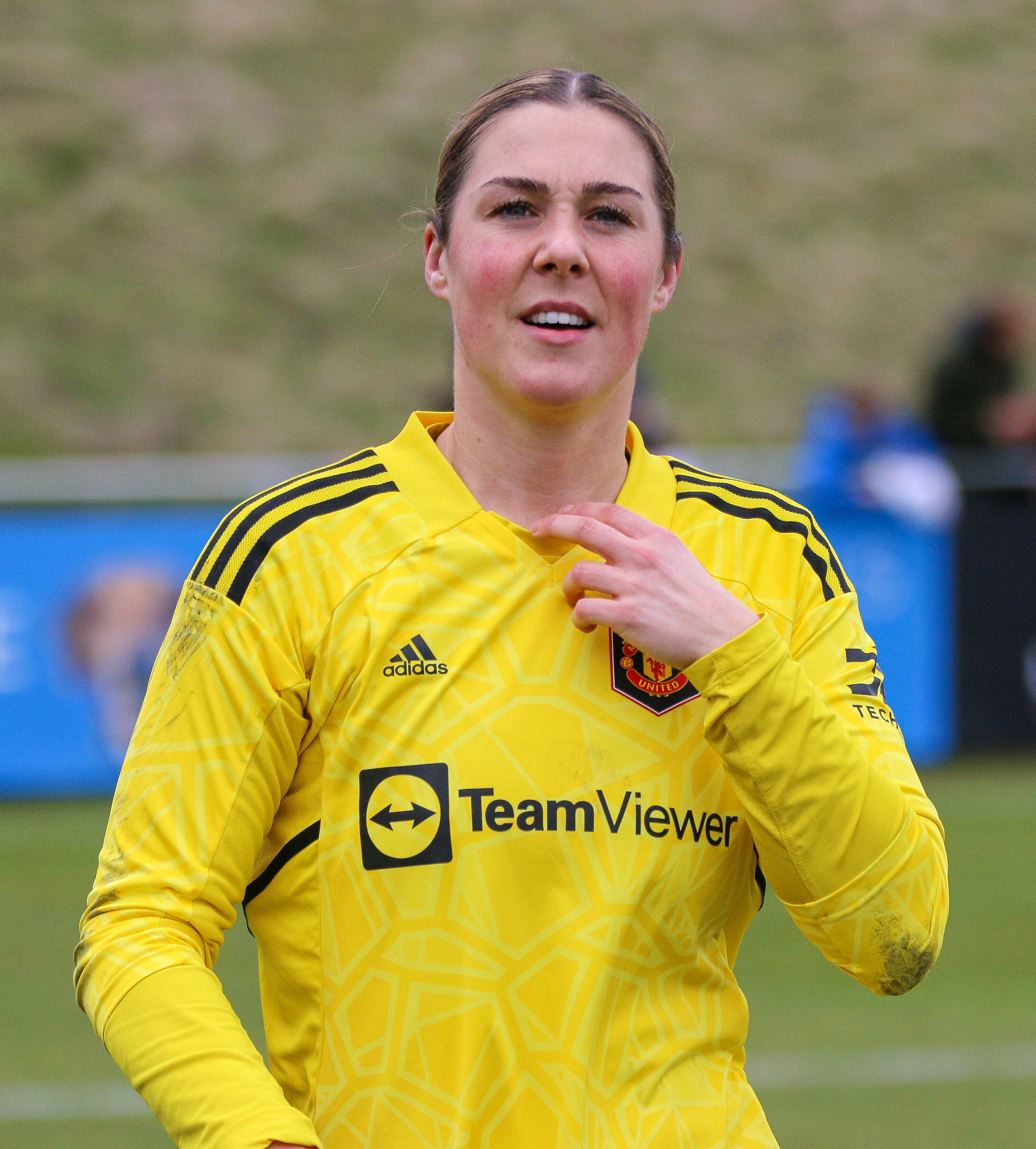
Mary Earps holds the record for most consecutive league appearances and most clean sheets for Manchester United.

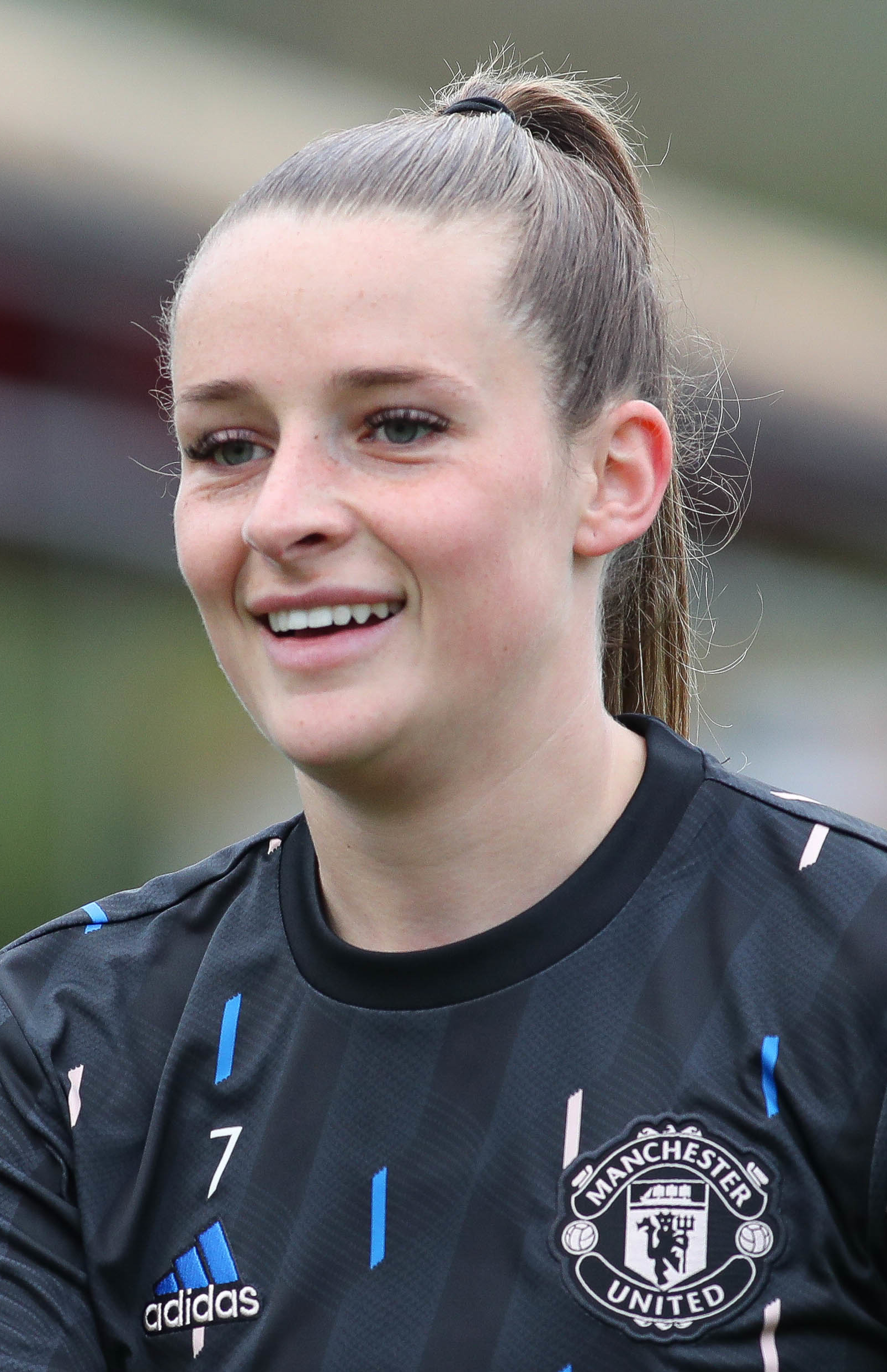
Ella Toone has scored the most goals and made the most appearances for Manchester United.

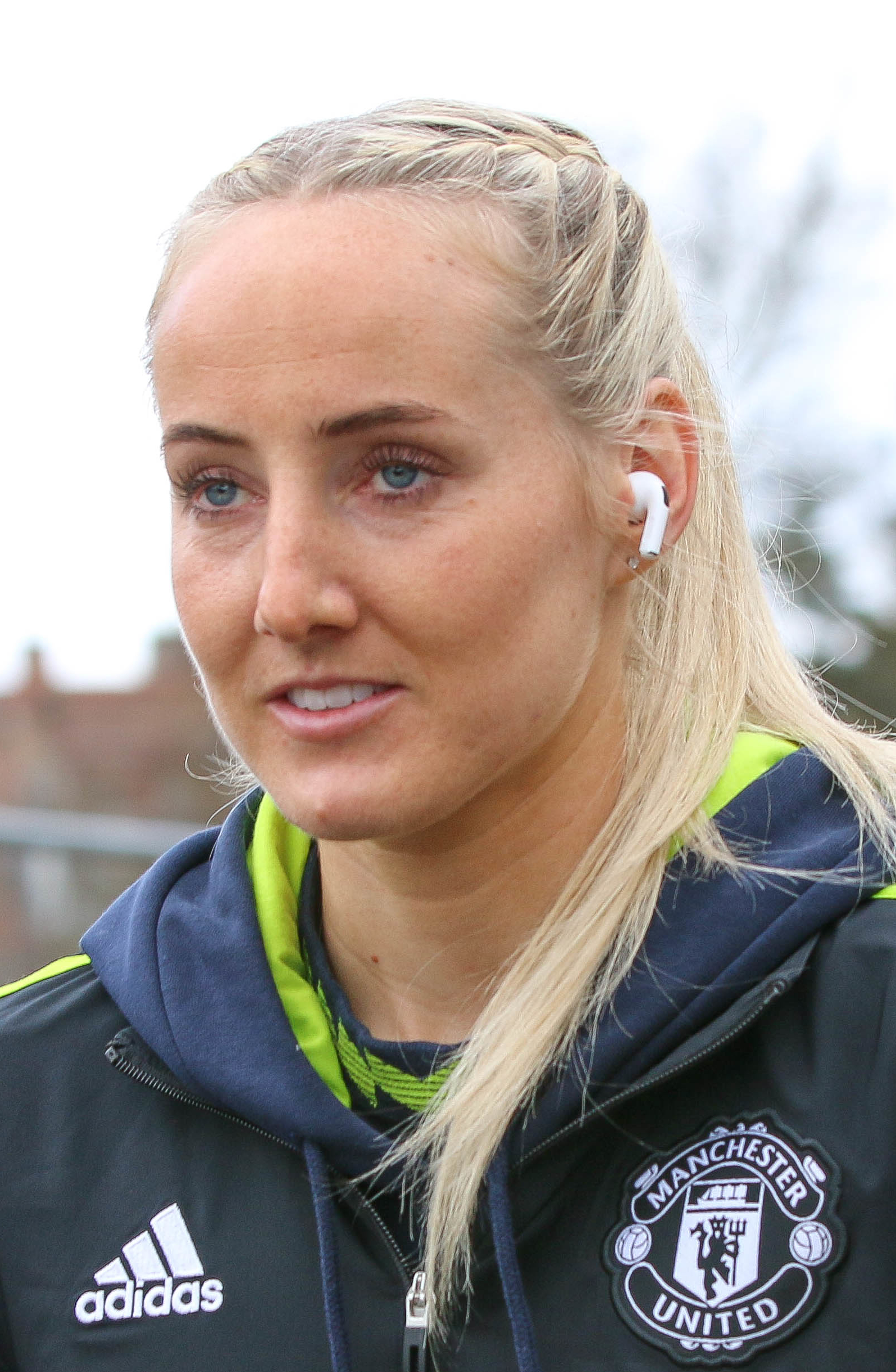
Millie Turner was one of seven players to make over 100 appearances for the club, along with Ella Toone, Leah Galton, Katie Zelem, Mary Earps, Hayley Ladd and Maya Le Tissier.

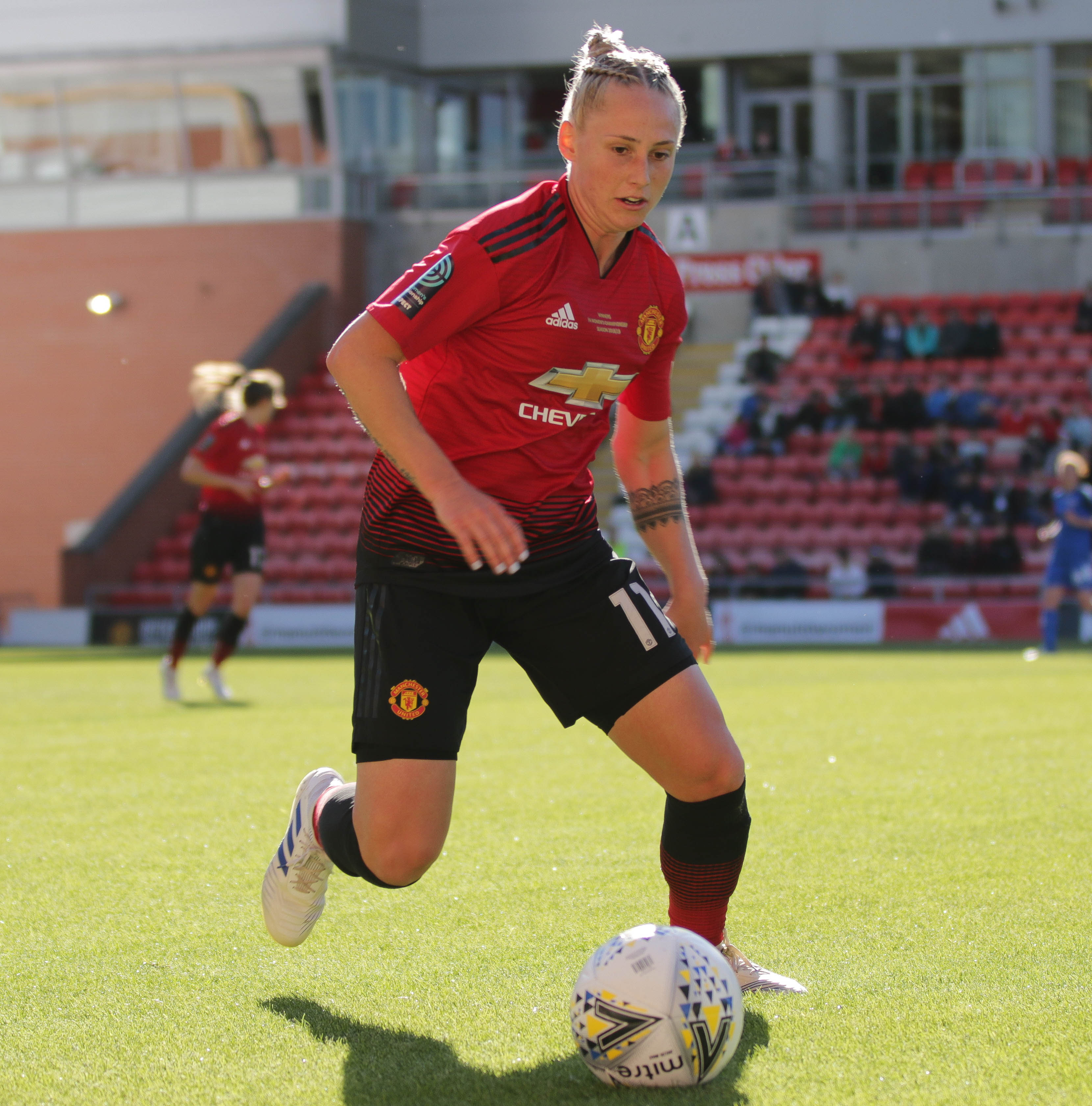
Leah Galton made over 100 appearances.

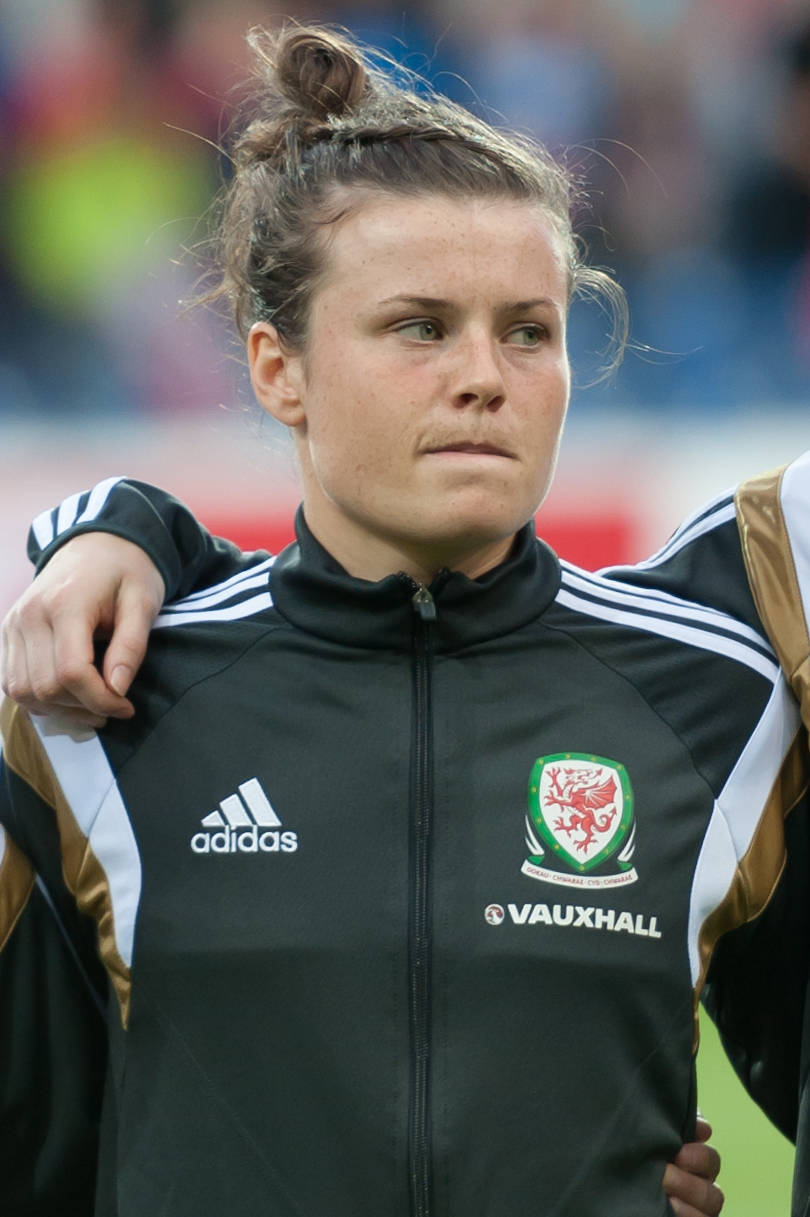
Hayley Ladd made over 100 appearances.

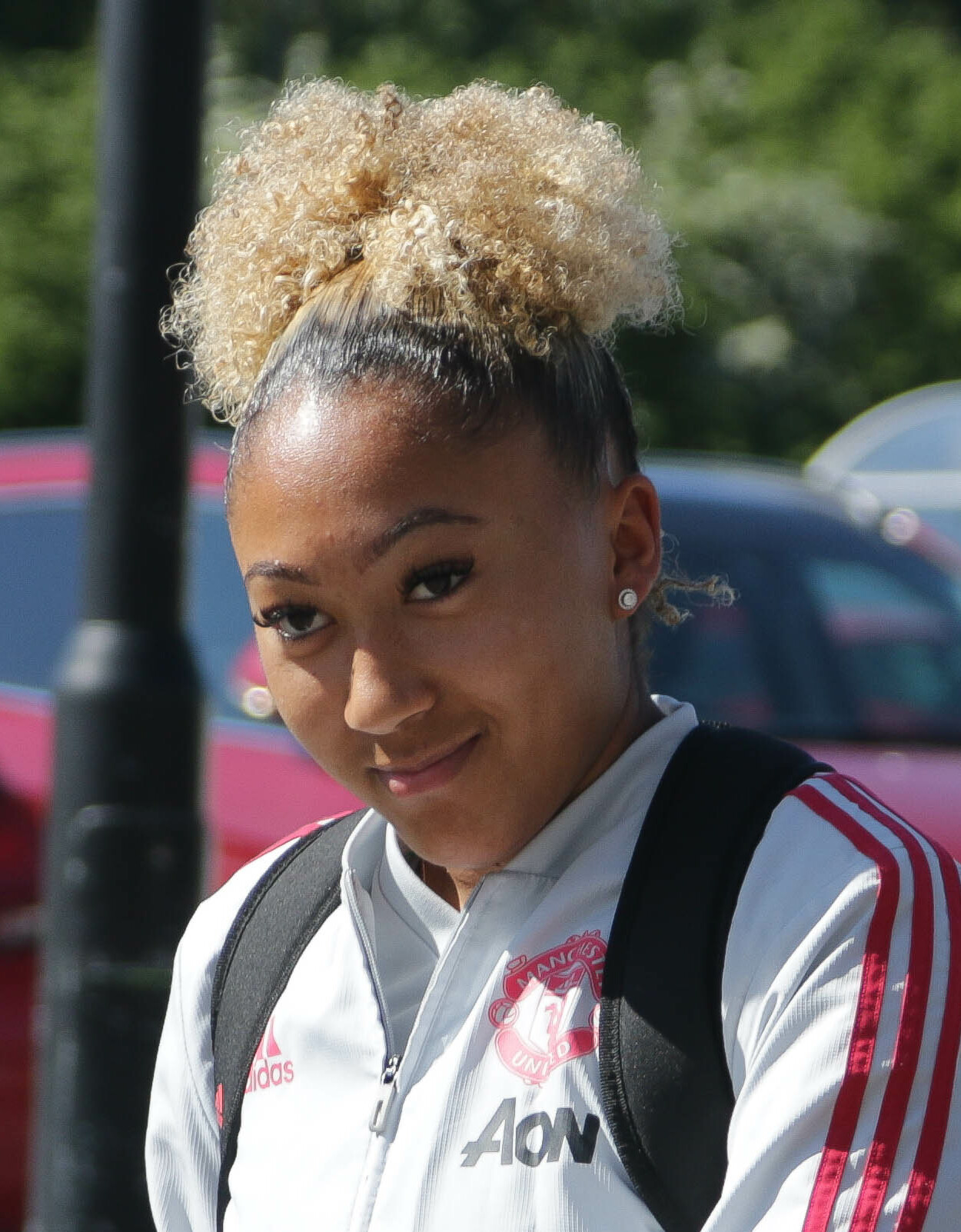
Lauren James was initially the team's youngest debutant.

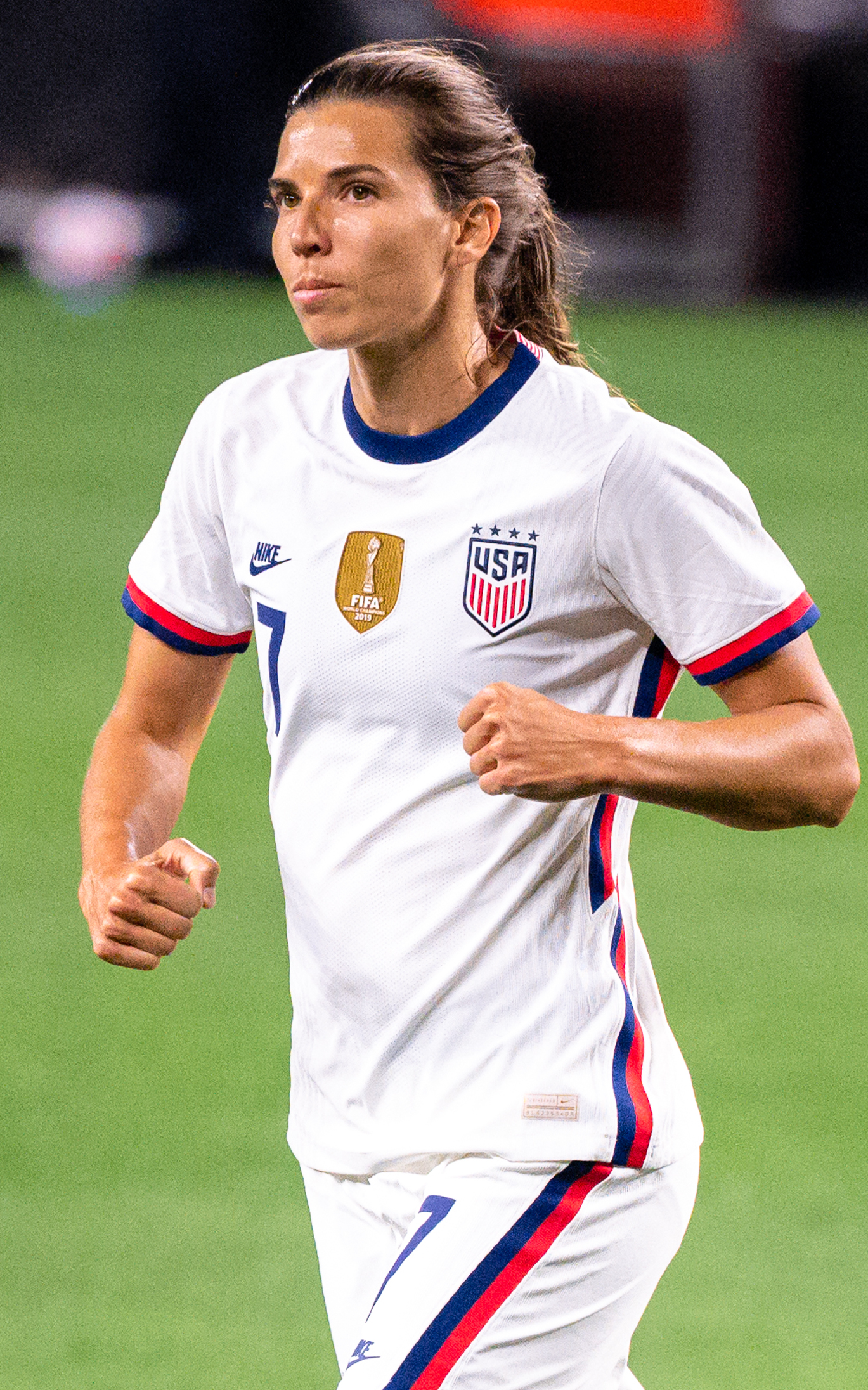
Tobin Heath was the first non-European to play for Manchester United.

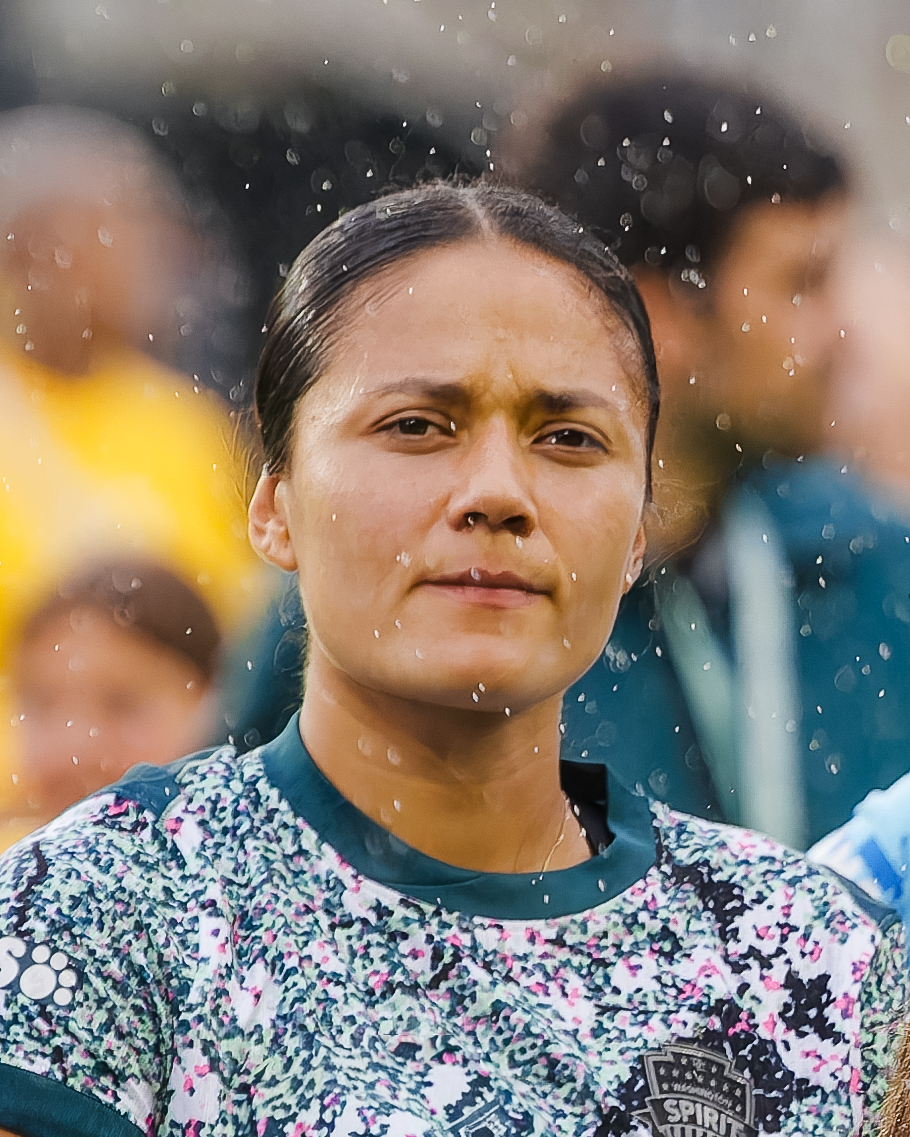
Rebeca Bernal is one of the club's most recent debutants.

- Appearances and goals are for first-team competitive matches only, including WSL, Championship, FA Cup, League Cup, Champions League matches.
- Players are listed according to the date of their first-team debut for the club.

Statistics correct as of match played 22 November 2026

Table headers

- Nationality – If a player played international football, the country/countries they played for are shown. Otherwise, the player's nationality is given as their country of birth.
- Manchester United career – The year of the player's first appearance for Manchester United to the year of their last appearance.
- Starts – The number of matches started.
- Sub – The number of matches played as a substitute.
- Total – The total number of matches played, both as a starter and as a substitute.

Positions key
GK	Goalkeeper
DF	Defender
MF	Midfielder
FW	Forward
U	Utility player^{1}

List of Manchester United W.F.C. players
Name	Nationality	Position	Manchester United career	Starts	Subs	Total	Goals	Ref
Name	Nationality	Position	Manchester United career	Appearances			Goals	Ref
Siobhan Chamberlain	England	GK	2018–2019	27	0	27	0	
Kirsty Smith	Scotland	DF	2018–2022	51	7	58	1	
Amy Turner	England	DF	2018–2021	62	5	67	4	
Millie Turner	England	DF	2018–2026	183	6	189	12	
Alex Greenwood	England	DF	2018–2019	26	1	27	5	
Mollie Green	England	MF	2018–2019	25	4	29	16	
Katie Zelem	England	MF	2018–2024	151	10	161	32	
Lauren James	England	FW	2018–2021	36	20	56	28	
Lizzie Arnot	Scotland	FW	2018–2020	19	15	34	9	
Jessica Sigsworth	England	FW	2018–2021	45	21	66	26	
Kirsty Hanson	Scotland	FW	2018–2022	52	38	90	16	
Ella Toone	England	FW	2018–	182	44	226	66	
Leah Galton	England	FW	2018–2026	136	36	172	44	
Charlie Devlin	England	MF	2018–2019	8	13	21	6	
Aimee Palmer	England	MF	2018–2019	7	8	15	1	
Martha Harris	England	DF	2018–2022	37	12	49	1	
Naomi Hartley	England	DF	2018–2019	1	2	3	0	
Fran Bentley	England	GK	2018–2021	0	2	2	0	
Emily Ramsey	England	GK	2018–2020	5	1	6	0	
Mary Earps	England	GK	2019–2024	124	1	125	0	
Lotta Ökvist	Sweden	DF	2019–2020	7	3	10	0	
Abbie McManus	England	DF	2019–2020	25	0	25	2	
Hayley Ladd	Wales	MF	2019–2024	84	26	110	11	
Jackie Groenen	Netherlands	MF	2019–2022	51	9	60	0	
Jane Ross	Scotland	FW	2019–2021	18	16	34	7	
Aurora Mikalsen	Norway	GK	2019	1	0	1	0	
Rebecca May	England	MF	2020	0	1	1	0	
Ona Batlle	Spain	DF	2020–2023	75	2	77	3	
Alessia Russo	England	FW	2020–2023	49	10	59	27	
Lucy Staniforth	England	MF	2020–2022	23	17	40	3	
Tobin Heath	United States	FW	2020	9	2	11	4	
Christen Press	United States	FW	2020–2021	12	5	17	4	
Ivana Fuso	Brazil	FW	2020–2022	5	16	21	2	
Maria Thorisdottir	Norway	DF	2021–2023	36	9	45	1	
Carrie Jones	Wales	MF	2021–2022	3	7	10	0	
Tara Bourne	England	DF	2021	0	1	1	0	
Hannah Blundell	England	DF	2021–2025	84	11	95	3	
Aoife Mannion	Ireland	DF	2021–2025	31	24	55	1	
Vilde Bøe Risa	Norway	MF	2021–2023	22	22	44	8	
Martha Thomas	Scotland	FW	2021–2023	24	29	53	8	
Sophie Baggaley	England	GK	2021–2022	10	0	10	0	
Karna Solskjær	Norway	FW	2022	0	1	1	0	
Signe Bruun	Denmark	FW	2022	2	5	7	0	
Diane Caldwell	Ireland	DF	2022	6	0	6	0	
Jade Moore	England	MF	2022	3	6	9	2	
Maya Le Tissier	England	DF	2022–	150	2	152	16	
Lucía García	Spain	FW	2022–2024	36	24	60	16	
Adriana Leon	Canada	FW	2022–2023	3	6	9	3	
Nikita Parris	England	FW	2022–2024	42	15	57	25	
Aïssatou Tounkara	France	DF	2022	4	1	5	0	
Rachel Williams	England	FW	2022–2025	18	72	90	21	
Keira Barry	England	FW	2022–2025	0	2	2	0	
Alyssa Aherne	England	FW	2022	0	1	1	0	
Estelle Cascarino	France	MF	2023	0	2	2	0	
Lisa Naalsund	Norway	MF	2023–2026	44	30	74	8	
Jayde Riviere	Canada	DF	2023–	74	10	84	1	
Gabby George	England	DF	2023–2026	34	20	54	1	
Geyse	Brazil	FW	2023–2025	25	14	39	3	
Hinata Miyazawa	Japan	MF	2023–	77	19	96	3	
Melvine Malard	France	FW	2023–2026	57	38	95	23	
Gemma Evans	Wales	DF	2023–2024	9	10	19	0	
Irene Guerrero	Spain	MF	2023–2024	1	6	7	0	
Phallon Tullis-Joyce	United States	GK	2023–	83	0	83	0	
Evie Rabjohn	England	DF	2023	0	1	1	0	
Dominique Janssen	Netherlands	DF	2024–	67	12	79	4	
Grace Clinton	England	MF	2024–2025	24	4	28	9	
Elisabeth Terland	Norway	FW	2024–	57	15	72	32	
Celin Bizet Dønnum	Norway	FW	2024–	27	14	41	7	
Simi Awujo	Canada	MF	2024–	23	35	58	4	
Anna Sandberg	Sweden	DF	2024–	43	21	64	1	
Emma Watson	Scotland	MF	2024–	3	2	5	2	
Jess Simpson	England	DF	2024–	4	2	6	1	
Safia Middleton-Patel	Wales	GK	2024–	4	0	4	0	
Mared Griffiths	Wales	MF	2025–	5	4	9	9	
Julia Zigiotti Olme	Sweden	MF	2025–	44	8	52	9	
Jess Park	England	MF	2025–	44	7	51	9	
Fridolina Rolfö	Sweden	FW	2025–	19	11	30	7	
Lea Schüller	Germany	FW	2026–	14	19	33	7	
Hanna Lundkvist	Sweden	DF	2026–	24	8	32	2	
Ellen Wangerheim	Sweden	FW	2026–	9	10	19	1	
Layla Drury	England	FW	2026–	0	9	9	1	
Jessica Anderson	England	MF	2026–	0	4	4	0	
Andrea Medina	Spain	DF	2026–	10	2	12	2	
Monica Jusu Bah	Sweden	FW	2026–	6	5	11	2	
Rebeca Bernal	Mexico	MF	2026–	5	5	10	3	
Janina Leitzig	Germany	GK	2026–	5	0	5	0	
Scarlett Hill	Wales	DF	2026–	2	2	4	0	
Lucy Newell	England	DF	2026–	0	1	1	0	

== Club captains ==
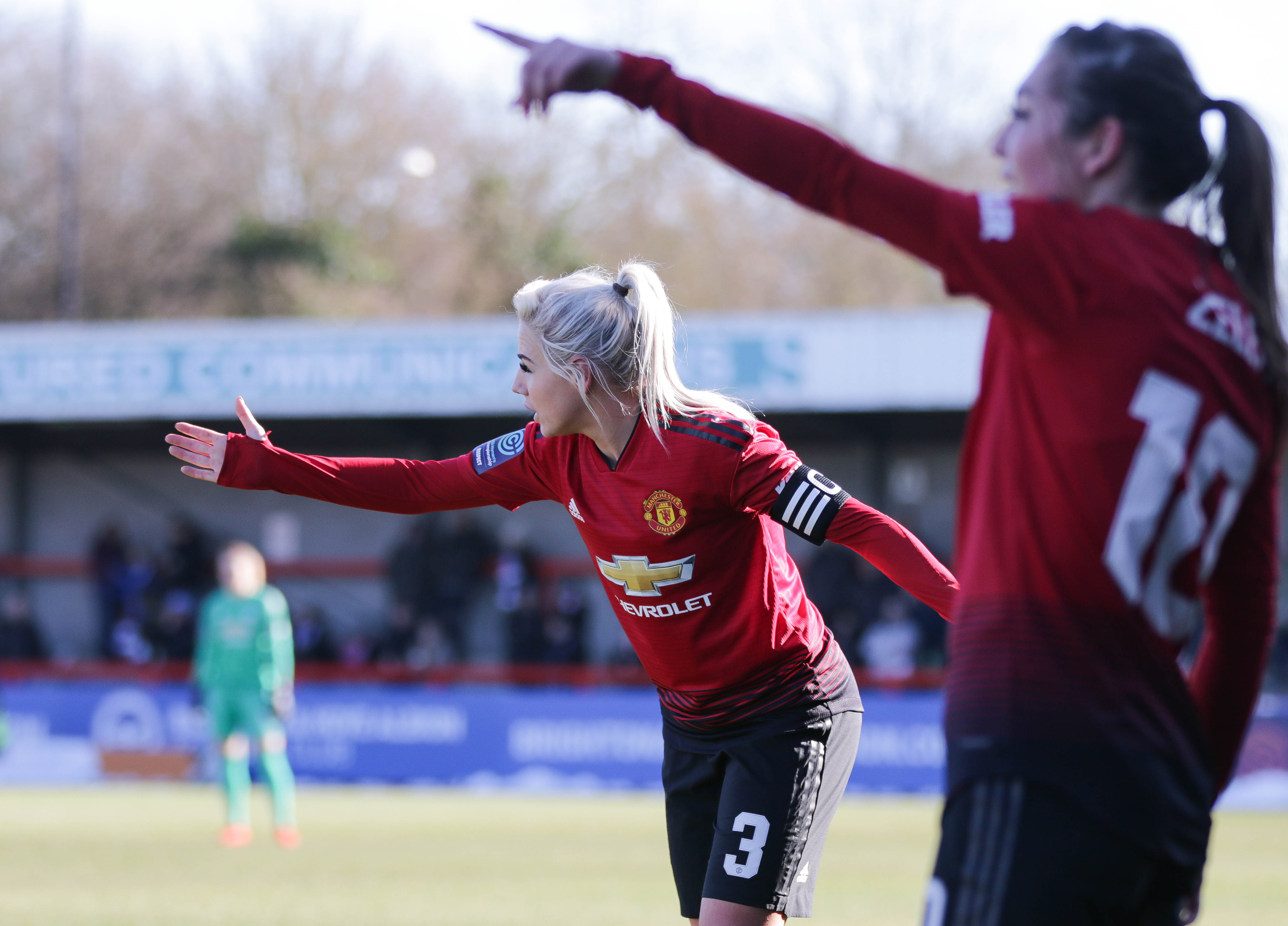
Manchester United's first women's team captain Alex Greenwood (left), with her successor Katie Zelem (right).

Dates	Captain	Honours (Note: As captain only.)	Ref.
2018–2019	(England) Alex Greenwood	2018–19 Championship	
2019–2024	(England) Katie Zelem	2023–24 FA Cup	
2024–present	(England) Maya Le Tissier		

=== Vice-captains ===
Dates	Vice-captain	Ref.
2018–2024	Position vacant	—N/a
2024–present	(England) Ella Toone	
