= Mary Earps =

English footballer (born 1993)

Mary Earps MBE
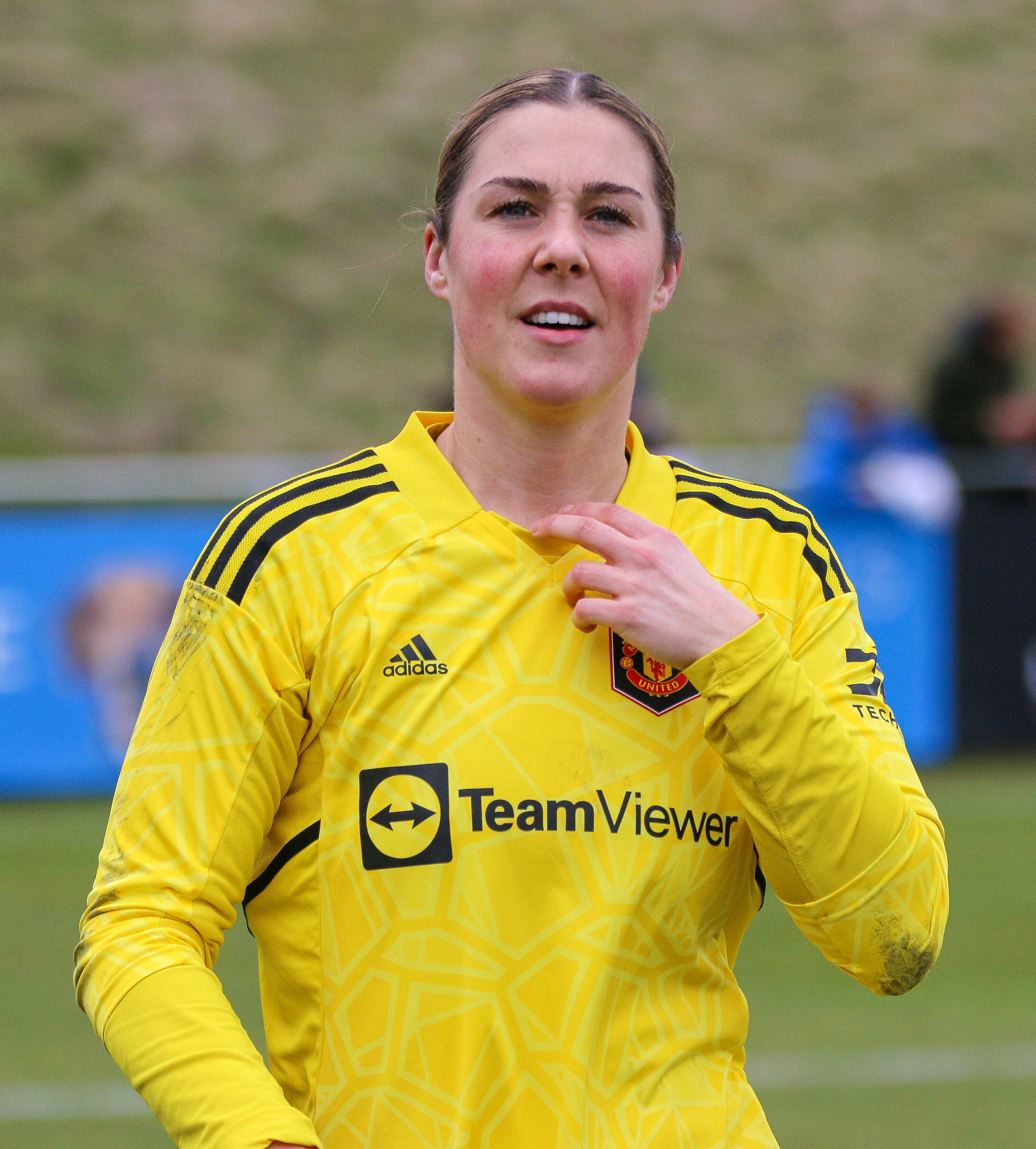
- Earps with Manchester United in 2023

Personal information
- Full name: Mary Alexandra Earps
- Date of birth: 7 March 1993 (age 33)
- Place of birth: Nottingham, England
- Height: 5 ft 8 in (1.73 m)
- Position: Goalkeeper

Team information
- Current team: London City Lionesses
- Number: 27

Youth career
- West Bridgford
- Leicester City
- Tottenham Hotspur

Senior career*
Years	Team	Apps	(Gls)
2009–2010	Leicester City	0	(0)
2010–2011	Nottingham Forest	4	(0)
2011–2012	Doncaster Rovers Belles	27	(0)
2011	→ Coventry City (loan)	0	(0)
2013	Birmingham City	11	(0)
2014–2015	Bristol Academy	28	(0)
2016–2018	Reading	34	(0)
2018–2019	VfL Wolfsburg	4	(0)
2019–2024	Manchester United	102	(0)
2024–2026	Paris Saint-Germain	42	(0)
2026–	London City Lionesses	3	(0)

International career^{‡}
2008–2010	England U17	6	(0)
2011–2012	England U19	10	(0)
2013–2016	England U23	12	(0)
2017–2025	England	53	(0)
Medal record
Women's football
Representing England
FIFA Women's World Cup
Runner-up	2023 Australia–New Zealand
UEFA Women's Championship
Winner	2022 England
UEFA–CONMEBOL Finalissima
Winner	2023 England
Representing Great Britain
Summer Universiade
Gold medal – first place	2013 Kazan	Team
- * Club domestic league appearances and goals as of 15 Nov 2026 ‡ National team caps and goals as of 15 Nov 2026

Mary Alexandra Earps MBE (born 7 March 1993) is an English professional footballer who plays as a goalkeeper for Women's Super League club London City Lionesses. At the 2023 FIFA Women's World Cup, she served as the vice captain for the England national team, and received the Golden Glove award for best goalkeeper of the tournament. Earps was announced the winner of 2023 BBC Sports Personality of the Year Award.

She previously played for WSL clubs Manchester United, Bristol Academy, Birmingham City, Doncaster Belles, and Reading, in the Première Ligue with PSG and in the Bundesliga with VfL Wolfsburg. Earps has represented England at under-17, under-19, and under-23 levels, and won her first senior cap in 2017.

== Early life and education ==
Earps grew up in West Bridgford, Nottingham and attended The Becket School. Her footballing journey started when she was aged 10 at West Bridgford, where she realised she had a particular knack for goalkeeping. As part of the "Where Greatness Is Made" campaign, a plaque honouring Earps was installed at West Bridgford.

Between 2012 and 2016, Earps earned a degree in Information Management and Business Studies from Loughborough University. In December 2023, she received an honorary doctorate from Loughborough – "Doctor of the University" – for services to sport.

== Club career ==
In 2009–10 Earps was promoted to Leicester City's first team squad from the centre of excellence, to provide competition for regular goalkeeper Leanne Hall. The following season Earps signed for Nottingham Forest. She was an unused substitute in Forest's penalty shootout defeat by Barnet in the FA Women's Premier League Cup final.

Doncaster Rovers Belles signed 18-year-old Earps immediately before the start of the inaugural 2011 season of the FA WSL. Belles manager John Buckley was pleased to secure her services: "She has outstanding potential and a very bright future ahead of her." Earps began to play regularly in the second part of the 2011 season, then joined Coventry City on loan during the off-season.

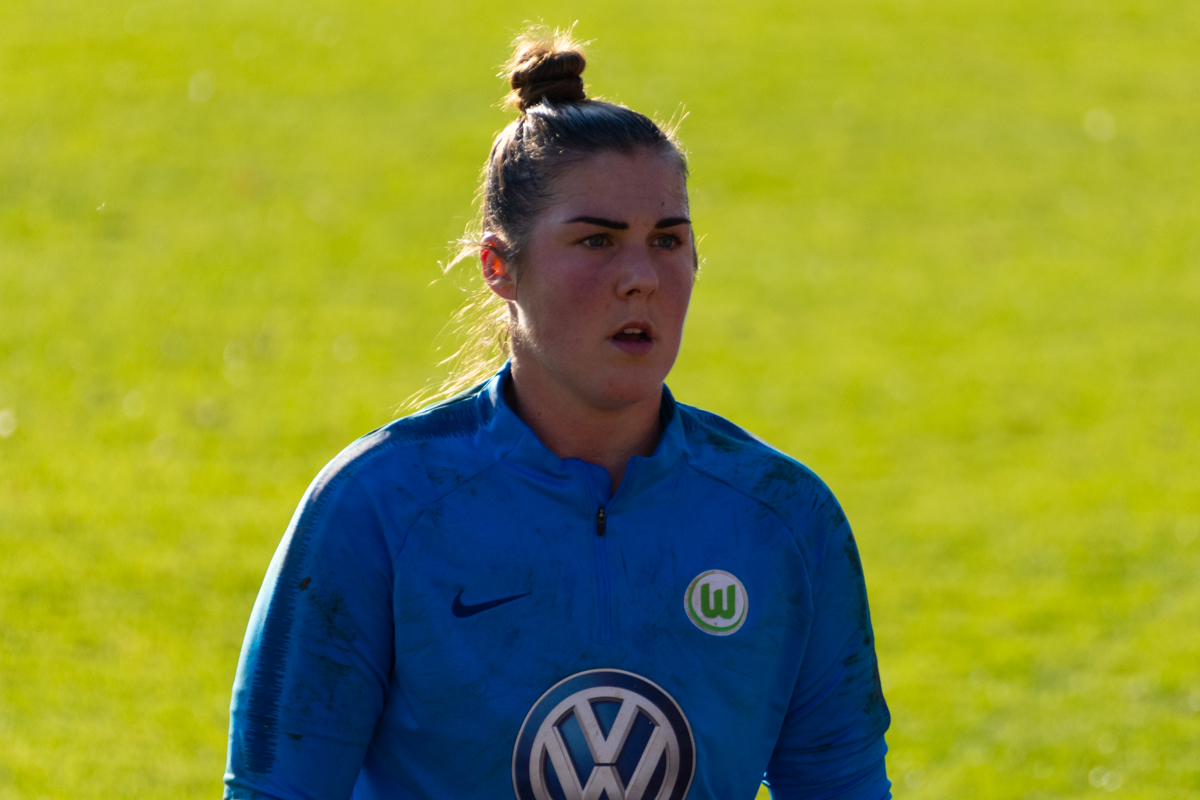
Earps with Wolfsburg in 2018

After spending the 2012 season with Doncaster, Earps joined Birmingham City ahead of 2013. In November 2013 she made her UEFA Women's Champions League debut in a 5–2 win over FC Zorky, staged at St Andrew's. The presence of Rebecca Spencer limited Earps's playing time at Birmingham, so she joined Bristol Academy for 2014.

At Bristol Earps played in all but one of the team's matches through the 2014 and 2015 seasons.

When Bristol were relegated at the end of her second season, Earps left to join Reading. In her first season with Reading, Earps won PFA Team of the Year honours.

In June 2018, Earps joined defending Bundesliga champions VfL Wolfsburg. She made her debut on 8 September 2018 in a 11–0 win over Hannover 96 in the DFB-Pokal second round. The team won their third consecutive domestic double during the 2018–19 season.

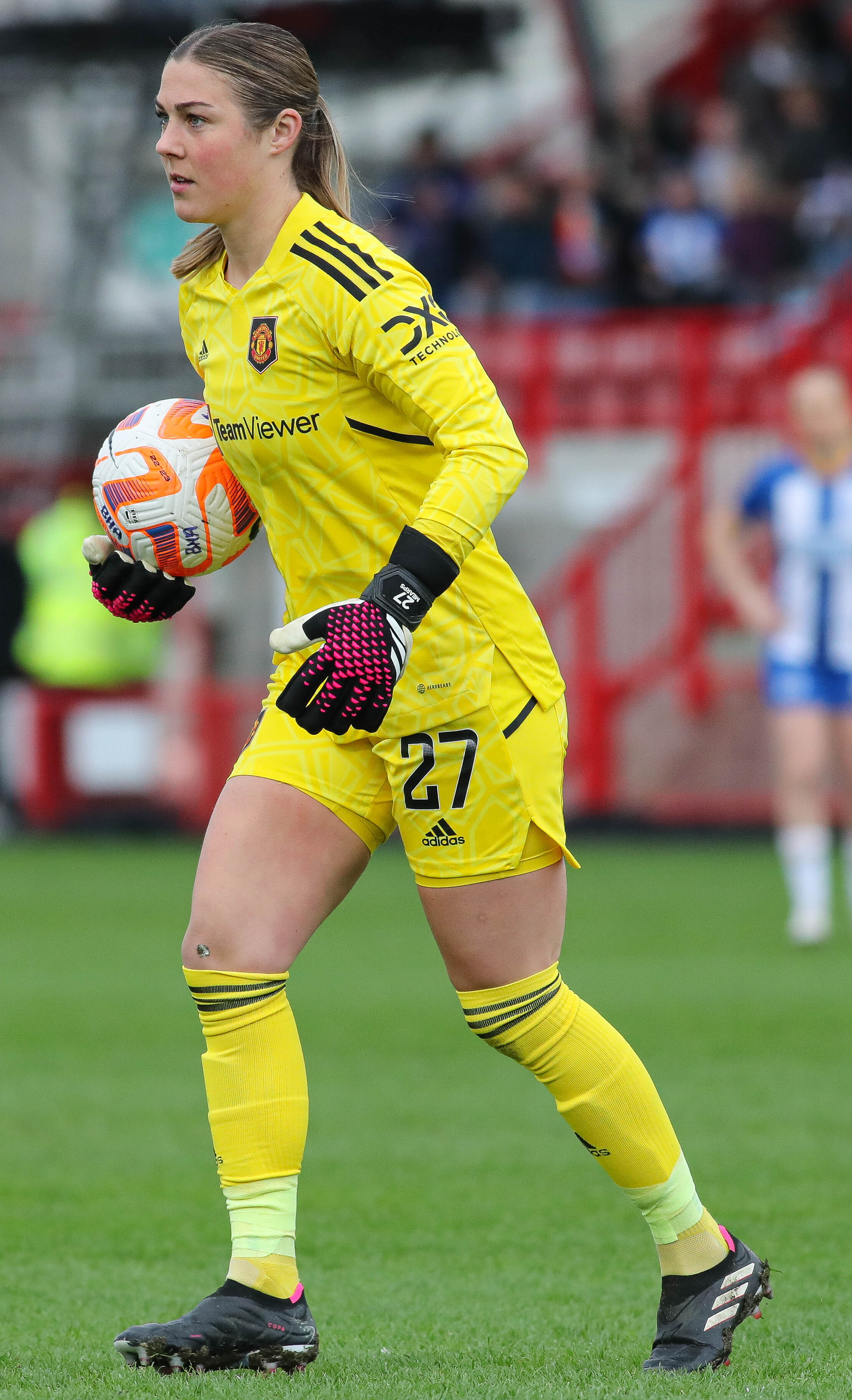
Earps with Manchester United in 2023

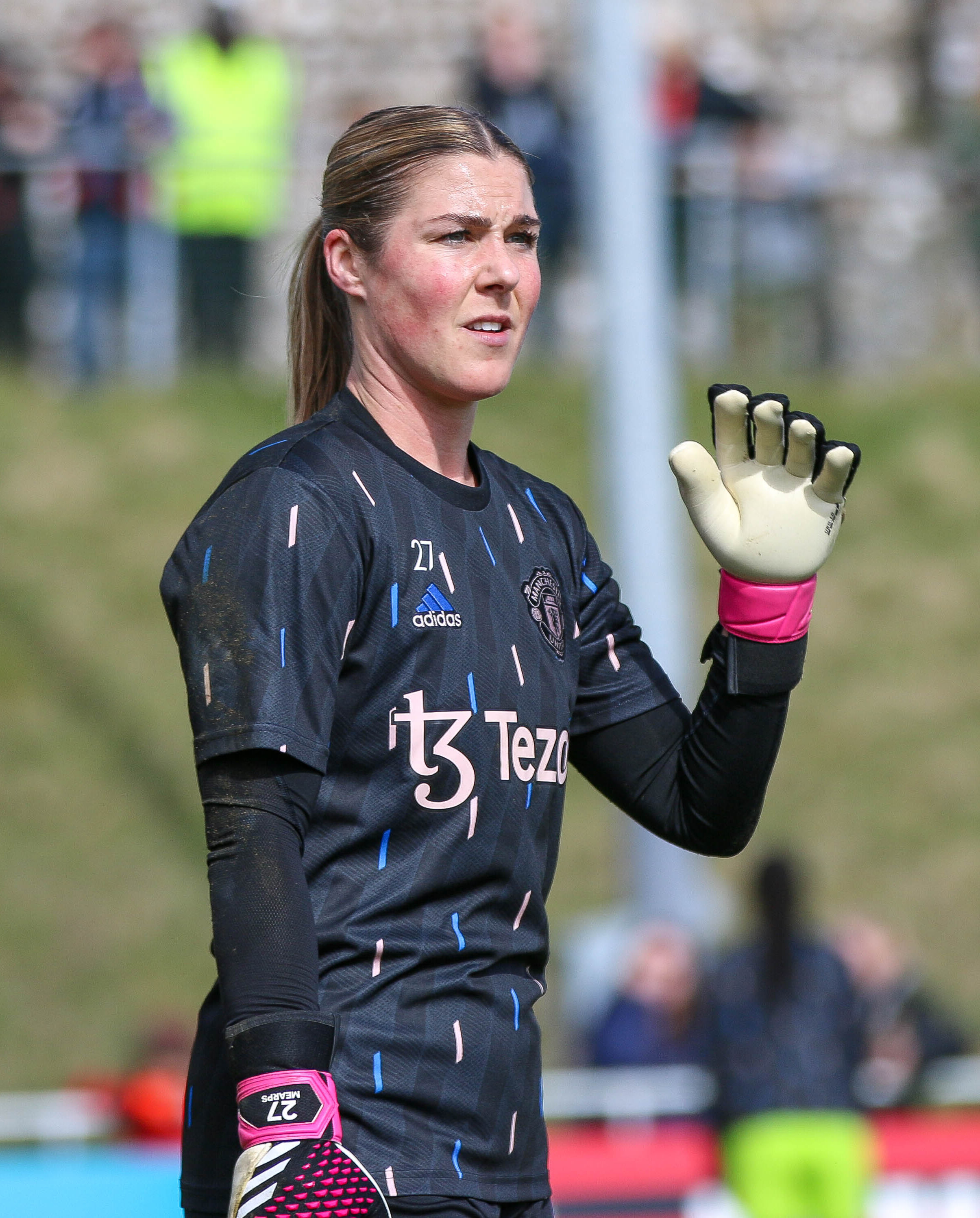
Earps with Manchester United in 2023

=== Manchester United ===
On 12 July 2019, after one season in Germany, Earps returned to England to sign for newly promoted Manchester United ahead of the 2019–20 season. Earps made her debut for Manchester United against Manchester City in the FA WSL on 7 September 2019, a 1–0 loss in the inaugural Manchester derby. She kept her first clean sheet for the club on 28 September 2019 in a 2–0 win over Liverpool, the club's first FA WSL victory. On 26 February 2021, Earps signed a new deal with Manchester United until 2023 with the option of a further year. Earps kept 14 league clean sheets, a new WSL record, during the 2022–23 Women's Super League season as she won the golden glove and Manchester United finished a club-record best 2nd-place, qualifying for the UEFA Women's Champions League for the first time as a result. She also helped the club to reached a major cup final for the first time, losing 1–0 to Chelsea in the final at Wembley Stadium.

In October 2023, Earps came fifth in Ballon d'Or voting. It was the highest a goalkeeper had placed since the female award was introduced in 2018. The previous best was 12th achieved by both Christiane Endler and Sari van Veenendaal. On 7 November 2023, she was awarded the Billy Seymour Impact Award at the 2023 Northwest Football Awards a recognition for her significant positive effect on football in the region. In November 2023, she was named both the Sunday Times Sportswoman of the Year and BBC Women's Footballer of the Year.

On 29 June 2024, Manchester United confirmed Earps had left the club upon the expiry of her contract.

=== Paris Saint-Germain ===
On 1 July 2024, Earps joined Première Ligue club Paris Saint-Germain on a two-year contract until June 2026. She and Paris Saint-Germain lost 5–2 on aggregate to Juventus in the 2024–25 UEFA Women's Champions League qualifying rounds.

On 12 November 2025, Earps returned to Manchester United in the Champions League for the first time since her move, where they lost 2–1.

=== London City Lionesses ===
Earps returned to England in June 2026, signing a two-year deal with the London City Lionesses.

== International career ==
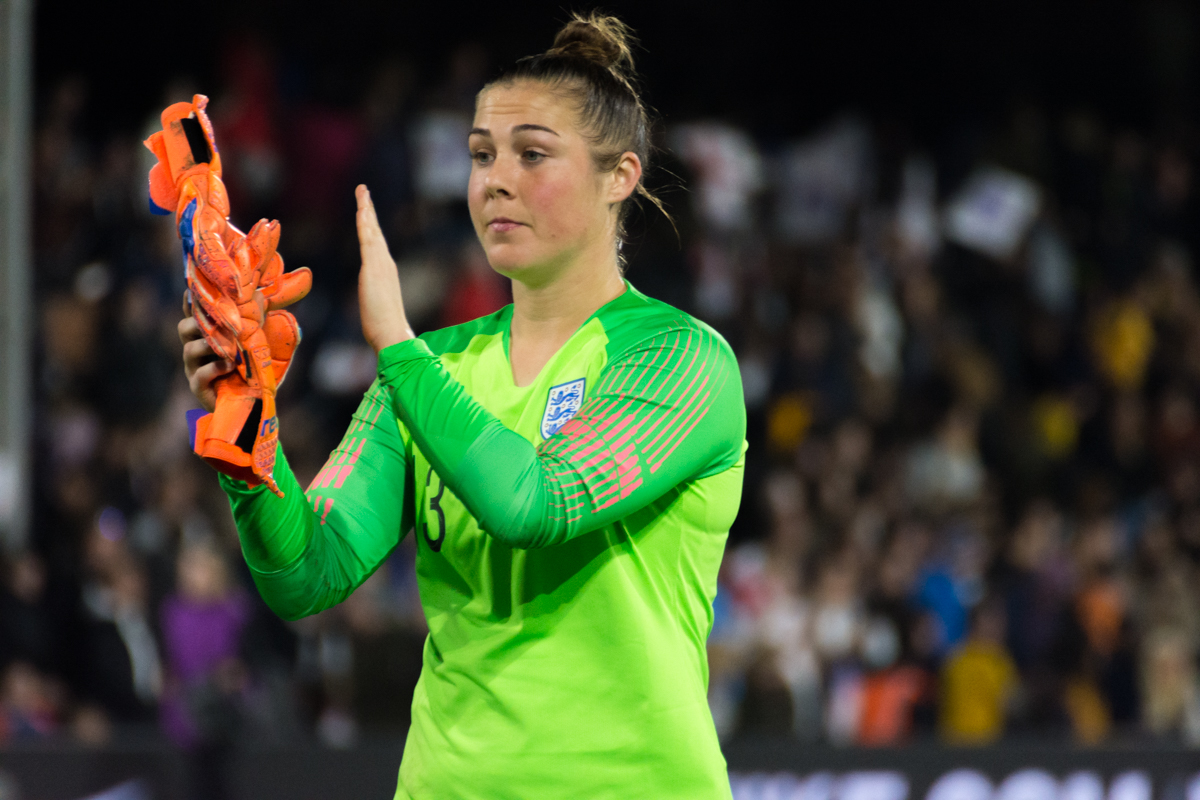
Earps playing for England against Australia in October 2018.

Earps played for England under-19 at the 2012 UEFA Women's Under-19 Championship in Antalya, Turkey. She won praise for her performances despite England's group stage exit. In July 2013, Loughborough University student Earps helped Great Britain to a gold medal in the 2013 Summer Universiade in Kazan, Russia. Following injuries to Karen Bardsley and Rachel Brown-Finnis, England's senior national team gave Earps her first call up for an April 2014 FIFA Women's World Cup qualification match against Montenegro at the Falmer Stadium, Brighton and Hove. She returned to the senior squad in September 2015 for England's 8–0 UEFA Women's Euro 2017 qualifying win in Estonia.

In June 2017, Earps was called up to England's training camp for UEFA Women's Euro 2017 as a fourth-choice goalkeeper. On 11 June 2017 she won her first senior cap in a 4–0 friendly win over Switzerland in Biel. She had her first senior start in September 2018, in a 6–0 victory over Kazakhstan.

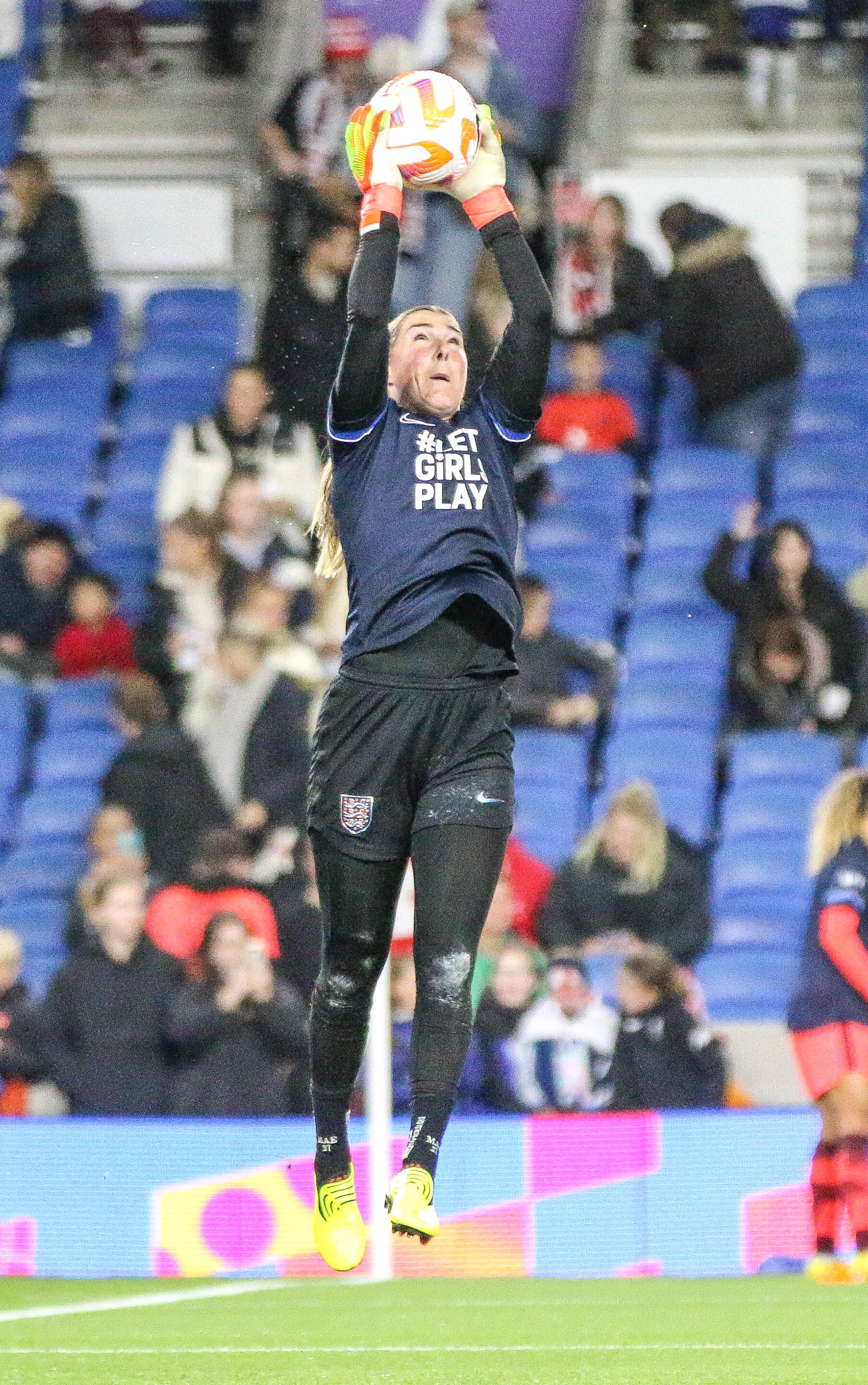
Earps with England in 2022

On 8 May 2019 she was named in the squad for the 2019 FIFA Women's World Cup.

On 17 September 2021, Earps was named as the starting goalkeeper in Sarina Wiegman's first game as England manager, her first Lionesses appearance since November 2019. England beat North Macedonia 8–0 as part of 2023 World Cup qualifying. Having remained as Wiegman's first choice goalkeeper starting in eight of her first 11 matches, Earps was included in the England squad for UEFA Women's Euro 2022 in June 2022. She played every minute of all six games during the campaign as England won the Euros for the first time. Earps conceded twice, keeping four clean sheets, the joint most tied with fellow finalist Merle Frohms of Germany, and was named to the Team of the Tournament.

Earps was allotted 198 when the FA announced their legacy numbers scheme to honour the 50th anniversary of England's inaugural international.

On 6 April 2023, Earps saved a penalty in a penalty shootout against Brazil to help win England the inaugural Women's Finalissima.

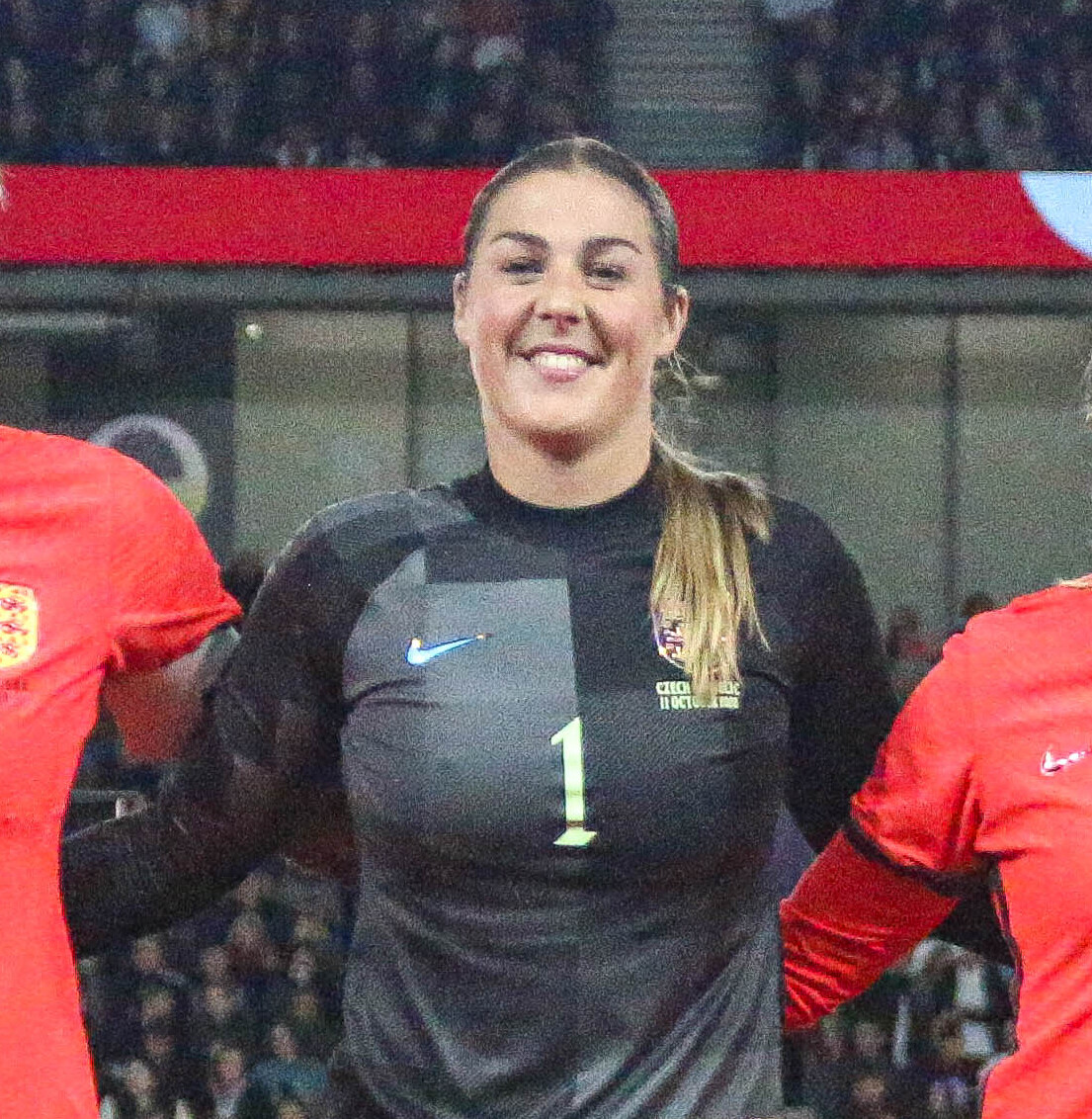
Earps with England in 2022

On 31 May 2023, Earps was named in the squad for the 2023 FIFA Women's World Cup in July 2023. On 21 July 2023, Earps complained that fans at the World Cup could not buy a replica shirt with her name on it because supplier Nike had decided not to manufacture one. During the World Cup, she played every minute of all seven matches, conceding four goals, three from open play, and keeping three clean sheets. During England's 1–0 defeat to Spain in the final on 20 August, Earps saved a penalty from Jennifer Hermoso in the 68th minute. She was awarded the Golden Glove for the tournament. On 19 September 2023, Earps was named England Women's Player of the Year for the 2022–23 season.

On 27 May 2025, after making 53 senior England appearances across eight years, Earps announced her retirement from international football, saying: "This is the right time for me to step aside and give the younger generation an opportunity to thrive." Shortly before Earps' announcement, Wiegman had stated that Hannah Hampton had moved ahead of Earps for the number one goalkeeper spot for England as they prepared for the UEFA Women's Euro 2025 tournament.

== Off the pitch ==
=== In culture and the media ===
In December 2023, Nottingham Express Transit (NET) named tram number 222 after Earps, following others with Nottingham connections, including Vicky McClure, Stuart Broad, and Brian Clough. In the same month, she also won the 2023 BBC Sports Personality of the Year Award.

In June 2023, Earps launched her own clothing and apparel business, MAE27.

Earps was appointed Member of the Order of the British Empire (MBE) in the 2024 New Year Honours for services to association football. In November 2024, after being selected in a public vote, Earps became the first female professional footballer honoured with a waxwork figure at Madame Tussauds in London.

Earps published her autobiography, Mary Earps: All In, in late 2025. During the book's release, controversy was sparked due to comments made in the book about former England teammate Hannah Hampton and manager Sarina Wiegman.

On 24 February 2026, she opened a football pitch named in her honour in her home town of Nottingham.

=== Personal life ===
On 31 October 2025, Earps disclosed that she was in a same-sex relationship.

On 6th November 2026, Earps took to Instagram to announce the birth of son, Xander, with her partner Kitty Forrest.

== Career statistics ==
=== Club ===
As of match played 29 March 2025

Appearances and goals by club, season and competition
Club	Season	League			National cup (Note: Includes the Women's FA Cup and DFB-Pokal)		League cup (Note: Includes the WPL Cup and WSL Cup/Women's League Cup)		Europe (Note: Includes the UEFA Women's Champions League)		Total	
Club	Season	Division	Apps	Goals	Apps	Goals	Apps	Goals	Apps	Goals	Apps	Goals
Leicester City	2009–10	WPL North	0	0	0	0	0	0	—		0	0
Nottingham Forest	2010–11	WPL National	4	0	0	0	2	0	—		6	0
Doncaster Rovers Belles	2011	WSL	14	0	0	0	1	0	—		15	0
Doncaster Rovers Belles	2012	WSL	13	0	2	0	3	0	—		18	0
Doncaster Rovers Belles	Total		27	0	2	0	4	0	—		33	0
Coventry City (loan)	2011–12	WPL National	0	0	0	0	0	0	—		0	0
Birmingham City	2013	WSL	11	0	0	0	3	0	1	0	15	0
Bristol Academy	2014	WSL 1	14	0	1	0	5	0	6	0	26	0
Bristol Academy	2015	WSL 1	14	0	1	0	5	0	—		20	0
Bristol Academy	Total		28	0	2	0	10	0	6	0	46	0
Reading	2016	WSL 1	12	0	1	0	1	0	—		14	0
Reading	2017	WSL 1	7	0	0	0	0	0	—		7	0
Reading	2017–18	WSL 1	15	0	1	0	0	0	—		16	0
Reading	Total		34	0	2	0	1	0	—		37	0
VfL Wolfsburg	2018–19	Bundesliga	4	0	2	0	—		0	0	6	0
VfL Wolfsburg II	2018–19	2. Bundesliga	2	0	—		—		—		2	0
Manchester United	2019–20	WSL	14	0	1	0	4	0	—		19	0
Manchester United	2020–21	WSL	22	0	2	0	1	0	—		25	0
Manchester United	2021–22	WSL	22	0	2	0	1	0	—		25	0
Manchester United	2022–23	WSL	22	0	5	0	0	0	—		27	0
Manchester United	2023–24	WSL	22	0	5	0	0	0	2	0	29	0
Manchester United	Total		102	0	15	0	6	0	2	0	125	0
Paris Saint-Germain	2024–25	Première Ligue	17	0	0	0	—		2	0	19	0
Career total			229	0	23	0	26	0	11	0	289	0

=== International ===
Statistics accurate as of match played 21 February 2025.

Year	England	
Year	Apps	Goals
2017	1	0
2018	3	0
2019	4	0
2020	0	0
2021	6	0
2022	15	0
2023	18	0
2024	5	0
2025	1	0
Total	53	0

== Honours ==
VfL Wolfsburg

- Frauen-Bundesliga: 2018–19
- DFB-Pokal: 2018–19

Manchester United

- Women's FA Cup: 2023–24; runner-up: 2022–23

England

- UEFA Women's Championship: 2022
- Women's Finalissima: 2023
- SheBelieves Cup: 2019
- Arnold Clark Cup: 2022, 2023
- FIFA Women's World Cup runner-up: 2023

Individual

- The Best FIFA Women's Goalkeeper: 2022, 2023
- Women's Super League Golden Glove: 2022–23
- FIFA Women's World Cup Golden Glove: 2023
- PFA WSL Team of the Year: 2016–17 FA WSL, 2022–23 FA WSL
- UEFA Women's Championship Team of the Tournament: 2022
- England Women's Player of the Year: 2022–23
- Freedom of the City of London (announced 1 August 2022)
- BBC Sports Personality of the Year: 2023
- BBC Women's Footballer of the Year: 2023
- Sunday Times Sportswoman of the Year: 2023
- Northwest Football Awards Billy Seymour Impact Award: 2023
- IFFHS Women's World's Best Goalkeeper: 2023
- IFFHS Women's World Team of the Year: 2023
- FIFA FIFPRO Women's World 11: 2023, 2024
- Women's Football Awards: 2023 World Cup Hero
- First female professional football player honoured with a wax figure at Madame Tussauds in London (2024)
- The Mary Earps Pitch was officially opened by Earps at Calverton F.C., Nottinghamshire, on 25 February 2026

== See also ==
- List of England women's international footballers
- List of Manchester United W.F.C. players
- FA WSL records and statistics
- List of people from Nottingham
