= The Henry Road =

Band from England

The Henry Road are a band from Nottingham, England. They are the primary and possibly only exponent of the style "wagon pop".

== Biography ==
The Henry Road were originally to be called Le Cube 100, but decided against this as they felt it implied greater knowledge of French and number than they could claim at the time.

They are the self-styled founders of Wagon Pop, "music that doesn't have a compelling urge to be hip". Their music draws heavily from progressive musicians of the 1960s and 1970s, particularly the Electric Light Orchestra, who are celebrated in their song "Jeff Lynne is Five". It is also reminiscent of bands with more of a comedy element, such as the Bonzo Dog Band, with whom they have been compared.

Their songs are often narrative in structure, but feature highly surreal characters and situations, such as Loggy Log, eponymous hero of the Loggy Log EP, Crap Arrow (an arrow that points in every direction at once and is therefore a sphere) and Mrs. Screen. Their own assumed identities are similarly strange and wonderful.

In 2006, the band lost a founder member and went straight back to their studio to finish the recording of their first album, Running at Dog 90. During this time they recruited a new guitarist: The Cohain (music journalist Steph Coole - reminiscent in style to Lester Bangs) and managed a handful of live dates. During this time the live gigs (which were still accompanied by a visual feast of Optikinetics and other lighting effects, manned by the Henry Road's 'fifth member'- the mysterious 'Metempsychosis'; they were also joined on stage by 'DJ Dan Rattomatic' of the hip hop outfit First Blood.

The beginning of 2008 saw the band relocate to London, and prepare to release and tour the new album. 2009 was meant to herald the release of debut single "Jeff Lynne is 5" and debut album Running at Dog 90.

== Personnel ==
- Tim Spectwatta - guitar
- Crisp Selection - guitar and bass
- Philip Cog - keyboards and lead vox
- Glen Lord - drums, lyrics
- The Cohain - guitar
- Dan Rattomatic - guest turntablist
- Brendan Omelia - lighting effects
- Scott Sandham - film
- Steph Coole - guitar and vox
- Simon Ashley - basses.

== Discography ==
- Horse Clock Leg EP (2002)
- And Arm EP (2003)
- Loggy Log EP (2004)
- Loggy Log 2 EP (2006)
- Running at Dog 90 (2008)
