= Nottingham Building Society =

Financial institution in the United Kingdom

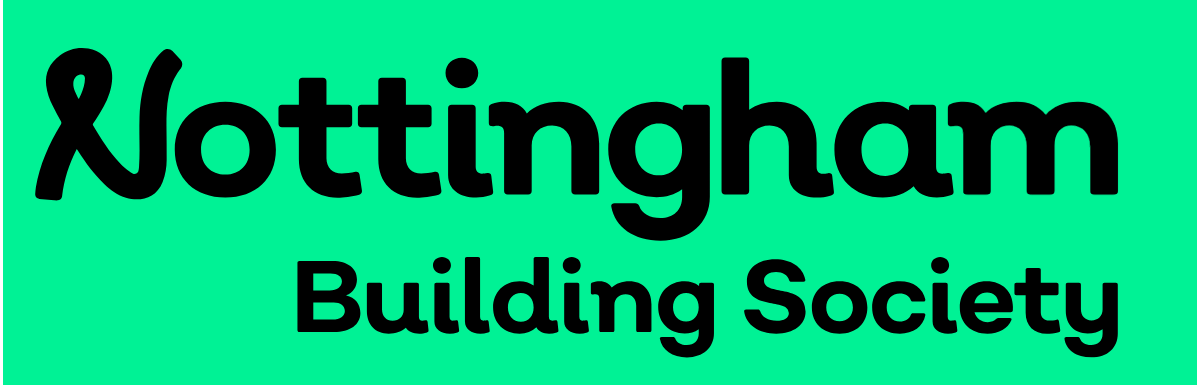

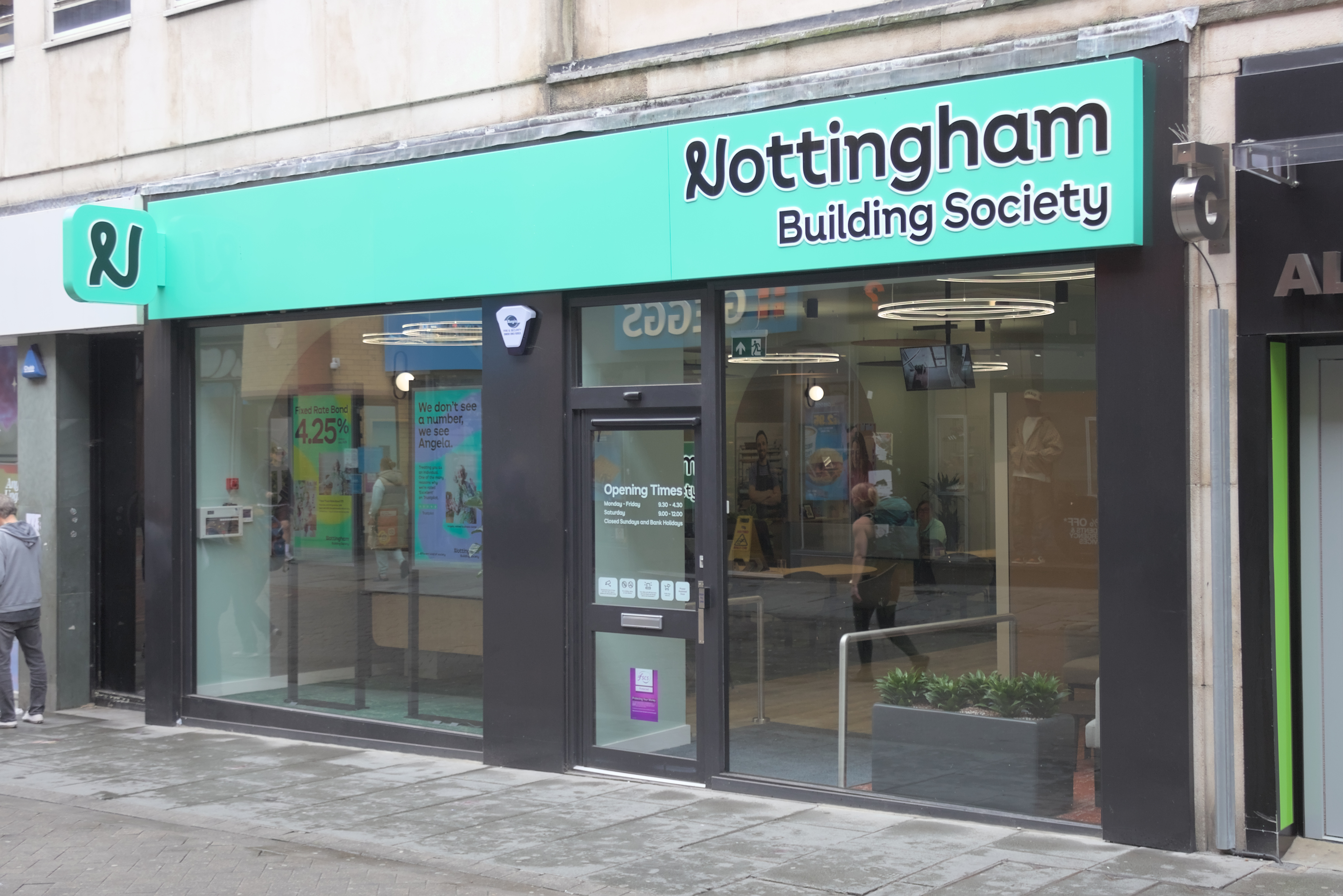
- A branch of the Nottingham Building Society on Clumber Street in Nottingham
- Formerly: Nottingham Permanent Benefit Building Society
- Type: Building society (mutual)
- Industry: Financial services
- Founded: 1849; 177 years ago
- Headquarters: Nottingham, England, UK
- Number of locations: 31
- Key people: Robin Ashton (chairman); Sue Hayes (chief executive)
- Products: Savings, mortgages, investments, insurance
- Revenue: ▲£88.4million (2024)
- Operating income: ▲£24.1million (2024)
- Net income: ▲£13.9million (2024)
- Total assets: ▲£5,226.7 million (2024)
- Total equity: ▲£253.3 million (2024)
- Number of employees: ▼478 (2024)
- Website: Official website

Nottingham Building Society is a building society in the UK, with its headquarters in Nottingham, England. It is a member of the Building Societies Association. At December 2024, the Society had total assets of more than £5 billion.

== History ==
The Society was founded by a group led by Samuel Fox (1781–1868), a Quaker and prominent local grocer, in 1849. (Note: Fox had been running a savings scheme with Louisa (Lucy Maria) Woods since the 1830s for students at their Adult School.)

The society's proposed purchase of a software system faced difficulties in 1992, because of the failing financial circumstances of the system's supplier, Eurodynamics Systems. In the course of a dispute between the society and Eurodynamics regarding non-payment of a number of disputed invoices, the software contract was terminated, both parties arguing that the other was in repudiatory breach of its contractual obligations. In responding to the society's request for an interim injunction compelling the supplier to provide the software, the judge, Chadwick, J (as he then was) sought to maintain the legal path which posed "the least risk of injustice" to the parties, deciding in favour of Nottingham Building Society. Reference to "the least risk of injustice" has since been made in other legal cases.
