= Natalie Hallam =

British actress

Natalie Hallam is a British actress. She has worked in film and television since 2002.

== Life ==
Hallam appeared in New Tricks, Beautiful People, Extras, EastEnders and five of the eight Harry Potter films.

== Filmography ==
- The Four Feathers as High Class Lady (2002)
- The Gathering Storm as 40's Cinema woman (2002)
- Wheeling Dealing as Javelin Thrower (2004)
- Stage Beauty as Auditioning Actress (2004)
- Harry Potter and the Goblet of Fire as Wizard Teacher (2005)
- Perfect Parents as Catholic School Nun (2006)
- Extras as When the Whistle Blows Floor Manager (TV episodes, 2006–2007)
- Harry Potter and the Order of the Phoenix as Wizard Teacher (2007)
- Son of Rambow as Mary's Mother Flashback (2007)
- The Dark Knight as Ferry Passenger (2008)
- Love Soup as Security guard (TV episode, 2008)
- The Day of the Triffids as Blind Woman (TV episode, 2009)
