= Intelligent Money =

Defunct British financial firm

Intelligent Money Limited
- Company type: Privately Owned Limited Liability Company
- Industry: Investment management
- Founded: 2002
- Defunct: May 2024
- Fate: Administration
- Successor: Quai Administration Services
- Headquarters: Nottingham, United Kingdom
- Area served: United Kingdom
- Key people: Julian Penniston-Hill (CEO); Chris Sutton (MD)
- Products: Asset Management
- AUM: £2bn (2023)
- Subsidiaries: Intelligent Money Trustees & Intelligent Money Nominees
- Website: www.intelligentmoney.com

Intelligent Money was a British Investment management company, personal pension provider and ISA plan manager, based in Nottingham, authorised and regulated by the Financial Conduct Authority.

The company went into administration in May 2024 after concerns for its financial stability by regulators. Soon afterwards the company and its assets were sold to Quai Administration Services Limited.

== History ==
=== Foundation ===
The company was established in 2002 by founder and sole financier Julian Penniston-Hill.

In March 2019, Intelligent Money stopped accepting Defined Benefit pension transfers into its Self-invested personal pensions (SIPPs) over concerns SIPP providers could be held liable for recommendations by advisers.

=== Tax case loss ===
In September 2023, Intelligent Money lost an appeal at the Upper Tribunal against HM Revenue & Customs (HMRC), in which Intelligent Money argued that Sipp fees are exempt from VAT.

=== Regulatory intervention ===
From February 2024 Intelligent Money became subject compensation claims related to financial adviser introduced SIPP business, agreeing to a voluntary FCA asset restriction requirement. This requirement prevented Intelligent Money from "disposing of, withdrawing… or diminishing" any of its assets without the FCA’s consent. The purpose of an asset restriction is to "maximise a firm’s ability to meet redress liabilities to consumers by limiting its ability to dissipate assets before it has assessed and paid any redress it owes", according to the FCA Handbook. It is believed, as of May 2024, that the Financial Ombudsman Service is processing more than 80 complaints against the Sipp provider.

=== Administration ===
The company's directors put the firm into voluntary administration in May 2024 after concerns for its financial stability by regulators. The administrator sold the company and its assets to Quai Administration Services Limited.
