= Samuel Fox (1781–1868) =

British businessman, philanthropist and abolitionist Quaker (1781–1868)

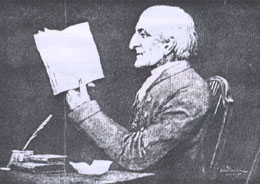
- sketch of Fox by his housekeeper (Lucy Maria Woods)
- Born: 24 November 1781
- Died: 6 August 1868 (aged 86)
- Known for: the first Adult School and founding the Nottingham Building Society
- Spouse: Sarah (2)
- Children: no

Samuel Fox (1781–1868) was a philanthropist and abolitionist Quaker from Nottingham, England. Fox was known for his good works in Nottingham. Fox supplied burials for cholera victims, food for the starving and helped start the first free school in Britain for poor adults. He founded and served as the first chairman of the Nottingham Building Society.

== Birth, marriages and business life ==
Samuel Fox was born on 24 November 1781, the son of William Fox and Mary, his wife (born Procter).

In 1810, he and Sarah Jowitt (1787–1827), the younger daughter of Thomas Jowitt (1760–1789) and Sarah Jowitt (born Storer, 1762–1799) were married. There were no children from this marriage.

His father had been a grocer and Samuel continued this business. Fox was renowned for serving all in strict order and tales are told of him turning back those who thought themselves too important to queue. Fox's premises were run on strict principles even having separate men's and ladies counters, with staff of the appropriate gender. Female staff wore uniforms including lavender gowns and bonnets

The Nottingham Building Society was formed in 1846 and after a stay at George Street in Nottingham the new society moved to Samuel Fox's grocery premises in the Market Square in Nottingham.

In 1861, Fox who then was 80, retired from his position as chairman of the Nottingham Building Society. By this time the society was opening daily and its main offices were at 16 Fletcher Gate in Nottingham. Fox died seven years later on 6 August 1868.

== Philanthropy ==
=== Adult School ===
Samuel Fox is credited with helping to start the first 'adult school' in 1798 in partnership with a Methodist named William Singleton. Initially the classes were for young women from local lace and hosiery factories. William Singleton, a Methodist, originally started the school, but it was Fox and the staff from his grocer's shop that maintained it. Fox's staff were expected to teach at this school and Fox provided breakfast at 9 a.m. on a Sunday after they had completed two hours of teaching. The school grew to include men, but it was said that Fox was specifically interested in improving adult education. Lessons are believed to have started with a Bible reading, but the book was then used as a textbook to enable scholars to practise reading and writing. In 1830, Lucy M Woods, started a savings scheme for pupils. Fox conducted lessons for three mornings a week for students of more advanced arithmetic and he would fund some to go to become teachers themselves.

In 1842, Joseph Sturge visited Nottingham, as he was local parliamentary candidate. Whilst there he visited the school run by Fox and his staff. The idea of a school that taught not only scripture, but also basic skills such as reading and writing was taken up by Sturge. Sturge opened a similar school, in Birmingham, in about 1845.

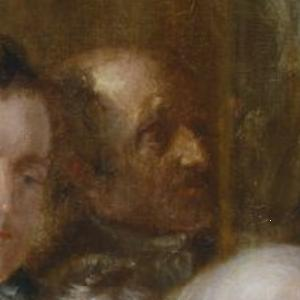
Fox in 1840 in a detail from the Anti-Slavery Convention painting.

=== Cholera epidemic ===
There was a major cholera outbreak in Nottingham in 1832 and a Nottingham Board of Health was formed. Although official sounding the Board of Health had no authority. It was concerned with the well-being of the inhabitants and Fox and Robert W. Willson were key members. Three hundred people were to die in the outbreak. The burial of their bodies was a major problem as one cemetery was full and the other had local objectors who were afraid of the effect of cholera victims on their families health. It was Fox who bought and provided land for the cemetery. It is now officially called St Mary's Rest Garden but it is still known locally as "Foxes Close". Willson was given the freedom of the city and went on to inspire the construction of Nottingham Cathedral and he became the first Bishop of Hobart. Fox allowed for the land to be consecrated as St Annes Cemetery in 1835 by William Howley, the Archbishop of Canterbury. This consecration prevented the funeral services of people who were not members of the Church of England. Fox and Willson were amongst many who could not use the burial ground.

The injustice of the situation regarding St Anne's burial ground was apparent and a group was formed that included Fox that petitioned parliament to allow the land to be divided into land for the Church of England and another area for dissenters. The cemetery did have that change of use but it took an Act of Parliament to achieve this.

Fox is on the left of at the back in this painting which is of the 1840 Anti-Slavery Convention. Move your cursor to identify him or click icon to enlarge

=== Abolition of Slavery ===
Fox attended the week-long World Anti-Slavery Convention in 1840. He was captured in a portrait with other Quakers like Josiah Forster, businessmen like Tapper Cadbury, bankers such as George Head Head and other prominent abolitionists from a number of countries including America, South Africa and Jamaica. The meeting had been organised by Joseph Sturge from Birmingham.

Samuel Fox became one of the Secretaries of the Nottingham Anti-Slavery Society.

=== Famines ===
Nottingham had famines in 1847, 1848 and 1849 and Fox again helped. Fox obtained maize flour which his customers had never seen or used before. Fox sold large quantities of the flour at two pence per pound less than he bought if for.
