= Julian Penniston-Hill =

- Born: 30 June 1970 (age 55); England U.K.
- Occupations: Founder and Chief Executive of Intelligent Money
- Years active: 2002–2024

Julian Penniston-Hill (born 30 June 1970) is a British businessman and entrepreneur, the founder and former chief executive of £1.2bn investment management firm Intelligent Money. The company entered voluntary administration following an upheld final decision from the Financial Ombudsman Service regarding some of the investments it allowed within its Sipps.

== Media ==
Penniston-Hill has been quoted in the media as a consumer champion, attacking disparities in the financial services industry and delivering alternatives for investors. This has resulted in attracting both praise and criticism.

Financial services industry trade paper Money Marketing wrote that Penniston-Hill's company is “taking the moral high ground regarding the way the industry structures its costs”.

Penniston-Hill is quoted in UK newspapers and specialist financial websites. as well as ITN news and the BBC.

== Other business activities ==
In 2016, Penniston-Hill purchased £150m Derbyshire financial advice firms, The Review Business and The Pension Review Business.
