= Thomas Brown (cricketer, born 1848) =

English cricketer

Personal information
- Full name: Thomas Brown
- Born: 14 June 1848; Bingham, Nottinghamshire, England
- Died: 2 July 1919 (aged 71); Netherfield, Nottinghamshire, England
- Batting: Right-handed
- Bowling: Right-arm medium
- Relatives: John Brown (brother)

Domestic team information
- Years: Team
- 1881: Nottinghamshire

Career statistics
| Competition | First-class |
|---|---|
| Matches | 4 |
| Runs scored | 118 |
| Batting average | 16.85 |
| 100s/50s | –/1 |
| Top score | 74 |
| Balls bowled | 76 |
| Wickets | – |
| Bowling average | – |
| 5 wickets in innings | – |
| 10 wickets in match | – |
| Best bowling | – |
| Catches/stumpings | –/– |
- Source: Cricinfo, 20 February 2013

Thomas Brown (14 June 1848 – 2 July 1919) was an English cricketer. Brown was a right-handed batsman who bowled right-arm medium pace. He was born at Bingham, Nottinghamshire.

Brown made his first-class debut for Nottinghamshire against Lancashire at Old Trafford in 1881. He made three further first-class appearances for the county in that season, against Middlesex, Surrey and Yorkshire. In his four first-class matches, Brown scored a total of 118 runs at an average of 16.85, with a high score of 74. This score came against Surrey.

He died at Netherfield, Nottinghamshire on 2 July 1919. His brother John also played first-class cricket.
