= Benjamin Nwoso =

Benjamin Chukukadiba Ejefoberi Nwoso was an Anglican priest in the 20th century.

Nwoso was ordained in 1936 by Morris Gelsthorpe, from 1933 to 1938 Assistant Bishop to the Bishop on the Niger. He was a parish priest from then until 1952 when he was appointed Archdeacon of Owerri. In 1955 he became Archdeacon of Onitsha, a post he held until 1970.
