= Stenner =

Stenner is a surname. Notable people with the surname include:

- Eloise Stenner (born 1997), English international field hockey player
- Hermann Stenner (1891–1914), German Expressionist painter
- John Stenner (1964–1994), American cyclist
- Jonathan Stenner (born 1966), English gastroenterologist and first-class cricketer
- Karen Stenner, Australian political scientist
