= Castledine =

Castledine is a surname, and may refer to

- Annie Castledine (1939–2016), British theatre director, teacher and dramaturg
- Fred Castledine (1937–2019), Australian rules football player
- Gary Castledine (born 1970), Scottish former footballer
- Leo Castledine (born 2005), English footballer
- George Castledine (died 2018), British nursing educator and nursing consultant
- Stafford Castledine (1912–1986), English cricketer
- Stewart Castledine (born 1973), English former footballer
