= Harry Churchill Beet =

Recipient of the Victoria Cross

Harry Churchill Beet VC
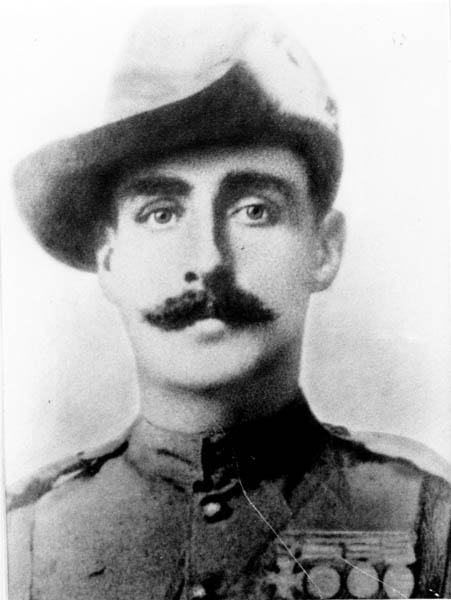
- Born: 1 April 1873; Brackendale Farm, near Bingham, Nottinghamshire
- Died: 10 January 1946 (aged 72); Vancouver, British Columbia, Canada
- Military career
- Allegiance: United Kingdom
- Branch: British Army; Canadian Army
- Rank: Captain
- Units: Derbyshire Regiment
- Conflicts: Tirah Campaign; Second Boer War; World War I
- Awards: Victoria Cross

Harry Churchill Beet VC (1 April 1873 – 10 January 1946) was an English recipient of the Victoria Cross, the highest and most prestigious award for gallantry in the face of the enemy that can be awarded to British and Commonwealth forces.

Beet was 27 years old, and a corporal in the 1st Battalion, Derbyshire Regiment, British Army during the Second Boer War when the following deed took place on 22 April 1900 at Wakkerstroom, South Africa, for which he was awarded the VC:

At Wakkerstroom, on the 22nd April, 1900, No. 2 Mounted Infantry Company, 1st Battalion Derbyshire Regiment, with two squadrons, Imperial Yeomanry, had to retire from near a farm, under a ridge held by Boers. Corporal Burnett, Imperial Yeomanry, was left on the ground wounded, and Corporal Beet, on seeing him, remained behind and placed him under cover, bound up his wounds, and by firing prevented the Boers from coming down to the farm till dark, when Doctor Wilson, Imperial Yeomanry, came to the wounded man's assistance. The retirement was carried out under a very heavy fire, and Corporal Beet was exposed to fire during the whole afternoon.

He stayed in South Africa until after the war had ended in June 1902, and returned to the United Kingdom on the SS Syria in September that year. On his return to his hometown Long Eaton, Derbyshire, his townsmen gave him what was reported as a ″great reception″.

He later achieved the rank of captain. He later emigrated to Saskatchewan, Canada, where he fought with the Canadian Expeditionary Force in World War I. In 1936 he settled in Vancouver where he remained until his death.

His Victoria Cross is displayed at the Sherwood Foresters Museum, The Castle, Nottingham, England.
