= Church of St Mary and All Saints, Bingham =

Church of England church

Coordinates: 52°56′57″N 00°57′24″W

Church of St. Mary and All Saints, Bingham
- Church of St. Mary and All Saints, Bingham
- Denomination: Church of England
- Churchmanship: Broad Church
- Website: www.binghamparishchurch.org.uk

History
- Dedication: St. Mary and All Saints

Administration
- Diocese: Diocese of Southwell and Nottingham
- Parish: Bingham, Nottinghamshire,

Clergy
- Rector: Jon Wright

The Church of St. Mary and All Saints, Bingham, is the parish church of Bingham in the Rushcliffe borough of Nottinghamshire, England. The church, in the Diocese of Southwell and Nottingham is a Grade I listed building and this was given by the Department for Digital, Culture, Media and Sport as a building of outstanding architectural and historical interest.

== History ==
The church is medieval in origin. It was restored by George Gilbert Scott in 1845–1846, with further work done by W. D. Caroe in 1912.

== Features ==
Interior

The lychgate installed in 1881 was designed by Frank Miles, son of Robert Miles, rector at the time.

== Bells ==
There are currently eight bells in the tower. In 1922, the bells were augmented from a ring of six to a ring of eight with the two trebles being added. They are rung on Sunday for the service and also on special occasions. They are additionally rung on Fridays as part of a practice night for the Bell Ringers from 19:30 to 21:00.

The largest bell is called the tenor, which has a weight of 14.3 cwt. The smallest bell is called the treble, which has a weight of 4.3 cwt.

== Clock ==
The church is known to have had a clock in 1775 when lightening struck the tower and damaged the clock. This clock was replaced in 1871 by one designed and built by G. & F. Cope of Nottingham. It chimed the Cambridge Quarters on four bells and struck the hour. It comprised a dead-beat pin escapement and displayed the time of four large dials 7 feet (2.1 m) in diameter.

== Organ ==
The organ was built by the London firm of Bryceson and Son and installed in 1859. It was officially opened on Thursday 15 September 1859.

== Incumbents ==
- Richard Wyot 1519–1522
- John Stapleton
- Robert Abbot, 1598–1615
- John Hanmer, 1615–1624
- Matthew Wren, 1624–1634
- William Robinson, 1635–1642
- Samuel Porter, 1643 onwards
- Samuel Brunsell, 1662–1687
- Henry Brunsell, 1687–1707
- William Browne, 1708–1710
- Henry Stanhope, 1711–1764
- John Walter, 1764–1810
- Robert Lowe, 1810–1845
- Robert Henry William Miles, 1845–1883
- Percy Howard Droosten, 1884–1906
- Henry Robert Mackenzie Hutt 1910–1933
- John Reay, 1933–1953
- Morris Gelsthorpe, 1953–1963, previously Bishop of Sudan
- Harold Arthur Kirton, 1963–1971
- David Peter Keene, 1971–1981
- David Swain, 1982–1994
- David Laurence Harper, 1994–2016.
- Jon Wright, 2017 onwards

== See also ==
- Grade I listed buildings in Nottinghamshire
- Listed buildings in Bingham, Nottinghamshire

== Sources ==
- The Buildings of England, Nottinghamshire. Nikolaus Pevsner
