= Listed buildings in Bingham, Nottinghamshire =

Bingham is a civil parish in the Rushcliffe district of Nottinghamshire, England. The parish contains 26 listed buildings that are recorded in the National Heritage List for England. Of these, one is listed at Grade I, the highest of the three grades, and the others are at Grade II, the lowest grade. The parish contains the market town of Bingham, and the most important building is a church, which is listed together with associated structures, including headstones in the churchyard. The other listed buildings include houses and associated structures, shop and offices, a public house, a former school and teacher's house, a market cross, and two telephone kiosks.

== Key ==
Grade	Criteria
I	Buildings of exceptional interest, sometimes considered to be internationally important
II	Buildings of national importance and special interest

== Buildings ==
Name and location	Photograph	Date	Notes	Grade
Church of St. Mary and All Saints; 52.95233°N 0.94851°W		13th century	The church has been altered and extended through the centuries, it was restored in 1845 by G.G. Scott, there were alterations in 1873, and another restoration in 1912 by W. D. Caröe. The church is built in stone with slate roofs, and consists of a nave with a clerestory, a north aisle, a south porch, north and south transepts, a chancel, a baptistry, and a west steeple. The steeple has a tower with two stages, a moulded plinth, buttresses, a string course, two-light bell openings and clock faces in the upper stage, over which is a corbel table with ball flower and masks, four gargoyles, and a parapet with two figures and two pinnacles. This is surmounted by a recessed octagonal spire, with three tiers of lucarnes, a weathercock and a finial.	I
19 and 21 Long Acre; 52.95147°N 0.95476°W	—	17th century	A cottage and farmhouse, later a shop, in colourwashed stone and brick on a partial plinth, with cogged and dentilled eaves, and roofs of tile and pantile with a coped gable and kneelers overlooking the street. There are five bays, the front bay with a single storey and the others with two. On the east front is a lean-to and a porch. The gable end contains a shop front, and most of the other windows are casements.	II
61 and 63 Long Acre; 52.95111°N 0.95013°W	—	Late 17th century	A farmhouse, later altered forming two houses. It has a timber framed core, with walls in red brick, applied decorative timber framing and rendering, and a roof of tile and pantile. There is a single storey and attics, and a front of five bays. On the front are two plank doors with carved spandrels, casement windows, and three gabled dormers. Inside, there is exposed timber framing and inglenook fireplaces.	II
Three headstones south of the choir vestry 52.95217°N 0.94861°W	—	1699	The headstones are grouped in the churchyard of the Church of St. Mary and All Saints 15 metres south of the choir vestry. They commemorate members of the Hean family, and are in slate. The left stone, to Edward, is dated 1769, and has a square head. The other stones have chamfered heads and incised scrolls, the middle one to Mary, dated 1699, and the right one to Thomas, dated 1700.	II
Pair of headstone south of the chancel 52.95217°N 0.94828°W		1704	The headstones are in the churchyard of the Church of St. Mary and All Saints 12 metres south of the chancel. They commemorate members of the Stevenson family, and are in slate. Both stones have square heads and are inscribed with depictions of angels. The left stone is to William, dated 1704, and has an hourglass and crossbones, and the right stone is to Mary, dated 1721, and has a verse inscription.	II
The Manor House; 52.95250°N 0.95127°W		Early 18th century	The house is in brick on a plinth, with a partial floor band, corner and central pilasters, an eaves band, a parapet, and a tile roof. There are two storeys and attics, a double depth and L-shaped plan, with a front of three bays. In the centre of the middle bay of the upper floor is a bowed panel on corbels with pilasters, and a semicircular hood on dentilled terracotta brackets. The windows are sashes, with keystones. The parapet contains three rendered panels with moulded frames. To the left is a two-storey four-bay extension containing a doorway, and a mix of sash windows and casements, some with segmental heads.	II
Three headstones southwest of the tower 52.95224°N 0.94891°W	—	1730	The headstones are grouped in the churchyard of the Church of St. Mary and All Saints 10 metres southwest of the tower. They commemorate members of the Horspool family, and are in slate. The left stone, dated 1731, is to Richard and is inscribed, and the central stone, dated 1730, is to Elizabeth and is plain. The right stone, dated 1765, is to another Elizabeth, it has a stepped, shouldered round head, and is inscribed with a scroll and a verse.	II
Lychgate, fence and wall, Church of St. Mary and All Saints; 52.95219°N 0.94893°W		Mid 18th century	The churchyard is enclosed by a dwarf stone wall with iron railings. At the eastern gateway are two stone gate piers with pyramidal caps and iron finials, a scrolled overthrow and lamp brackets, and iron gates. The western gateway has a lychgate dating from 1881, with four timber posts, and a gabled tile roof with inscribed bargeboards and elaborate decorative ironwork.	II
Pigeoncote, stables and cowshed opposite Porchester Farmhouse; 52.95082°N 0.94851°W	—	Mid 18th century	The farm buildings are in brick and have pantile roofs with coped gables and kneelers. They are in one two storeys, and are arranged on three sides of a farmyard. The pigeoncote contains eleven flight perches, blocked pigeonholes, and vents.	II
7 Church Street, outbuilding, walls and pump 52.95223°N 0.94987°W		Late 18th century	The house is in red brick, with cogged and dentilled eaves and a pantile roof. There are three storeys, and a T-shaped plan, with a front of three bays and a rear wing. In the centre is a round-headed doorway with a semicircular fanlight, and the windows are sashes with rubbed brick heads. At the rear is a lean-to in the angle, single-storey outbuildings with three bays, and an attached lead pump with a timber case, a scrolled iron handle, and a stone trough. To the west is a brick wall with corbelled brick coping, and to the north is a mud wall with gabled pantiled coping; both walls are about 30 metres (98 ft) long.	II
19 Market Place, shop and wall 52.95254°N 0.95152°W	—	Late 18th century	A house and adjoining shop in whitewashed brick, with dentilled eaves, and a tile roof with coped gables and kneelers. The house has three storeys and two bays. The central doorway has a shop window to the right, and the other windows are casements, those in the lower two floors with segmental heads. To the right is a shop with a single storey and a single bay. On the front is a doorway with a fanlight, a shop front to the right with a dentilled hood on shaped brackets, and a parapet. To the rear is a brick wall with gabled copings and two doorways.	II
7 and 9 Market Street; 52.95174°N 0.95271°W		Late 18th century	A shop and workshop in brick, partly rendered, with cogged and dentilled eaves, and pantile roofs with a coped gable. The building consists of a three-storey, single gabled bay, and a two-storey four-bay range to the right, and it is four bays deep. In the left bay is a shop front and a fascia on brackets, above which are sash windows. In the range to the right are casement windows and doorways with segmental heads, and above them are sash windows.	II
Beauvale House and outbuilding 52.95278°N 0.95255°W	—	Late 18th century	The house was later altered, with the front dating from about 1840. It is in brick and stone on a rendered plinth, with chamfered eaves, and a roof of Welsh and artificial slate with pedimented gables. There are two storeys with attics, and an L-shaped plan, with a front of three bays, the right bay gabled. On the front is an iron porch with a tented roof, and a doorway with a segmental head, to its right is a casement window, and these are flanked by square bay windows. At the rear is a single-storey six-bay outbuilding.	II
The Wheatsheaf Inn; 52.95125°N 0.95300°W		Late 18th century	The public house is in brick on a stone plinth, and has a floor band, dentilled eaves, and a slate roof. There are three storeys and three bays. In the centre is a doorway with a hood, the windows on the front are sashes, some horizontally-sliding, and on the west front are casement windows, some with segmental and some with elliptical heads. At the rear is a stable range with a pantile roof, one and two storeys, and nine bays.	II
7 Union Street; 52.95171°N 0.95324°W	—	c. 1800	Two houses converted into a butcher's shop and abattoir in the 19th century, and later into a café, it is in painted brick with stone dressings and pantile roofs. The building consists of a block with three storeys and two bays, a two-storey two-bay wing to the right, and a single-storey rear range. On the front, to the left is a round-arched doorway, to its right are two shop windows, and in the wing is a cart entrance. The windows are sashes, those in the ground floor with wedge lintels and double keystones. At the rear is a yard, a doorway with a gabled porch, and a boxed pump.	II
Headstone south of the choir vestry 52.95218°N 0.94848°W	—	1801	The headstone is in the churchyard of the Church of St. Mary and All Saints 1.5 metres south of the choir vestry. It is in slate, and commemorates three children of Samuel and Mary White. The headstone has a classical border inscribed with urns, and it contains a half-round cartouche depicting Bingham on the Day of Resurrection, and a verse couplet.	II
Water pump, 19 and 21 Long Acre; 52.95162°N 0.95477°W	—	Early 19th century	The water pump at the rear of the house is in a rectangular wooden case. It is in lead, and has an iron pump handle and an adjoining stone trough.	II
10 Market Street and 1 Union Street; 52.95172°N 0.95295°W		Early 19th century	A house, later an office, on a corner site, in whitewashed stuccoed brick, on a plinth, the ground floor rusticated, with quoins, moulded eaves, and a slate roof. There are three storeys, three bays on Union Street and one on Market Street. In the centre is a doorway with pilasters and a hood on shaped brackets, flanked by ogee-headed bootscrapers. On the left return is a 20th-century shop window and a doorway, and the windows are sashes, those in the lower two floors with channelled wedge lintels and keystones.	II
Haden House; 52.95272°N 0.95217°W	—	Early 19th century	A pair of houses and a service wing in whitewashed stuccoed brick on a plinth, with moulded eaves, parapets and hipped slate roofs. The left house has three storeys and three bays, and contains a Doric portico, and the right house has two storeys and three bays, and has a portico dating from 1984. The windows are sashes, in the left house with moulded architraves. Between the two houses is a two-storey single-bay link containing tripartite sash windows, and to the right is a single-storey single-bay wing with a sash window.	II
16 Long Acre and wall 52.95035°N 0.94462°W	—	1831	The house is in whitewashed stuccoed brick on a plinth, with deep eaves, a hipped slate roof and a flat asphalt roof. There are three storeys and four bays, and a two-storey two-bay service wing to the left. On the front is a porch tower, elsewhere are canted bay windows, and most of the other windows are sashes. The boundary wall is in brick with ramped gabled coping, it extends for about 25 metres (82 ft), and contains a pair of square gate piers with flat caps, between which is an iron overthrow and an elaborate gate.	II
Summerhouse, 16 Long Acre; 52.95016°N 0.94495°W	—	1831	The summerhouse is in whitewashed rendered brick on a plinth, with dentilled eaves, and it has slate roofs with moulded coped gables and kneelers. The building is in Gothick style and has a square plan. On the north front is a doorway with a pointed arch and a moulded architrave, over which are quatrefoil panels and a dated shield. On the gable are three urns, and the windows are casements.	II
Brompton House, walls and summerhouse 52.95192°N 0.95434°W	—	1836	The house is in red brick, with roofs of pantile and slate, and two storeys. On the front are two arched recesses containing doorways with fanlights, and sash windows. At the rear is a wing containing a canted bay window, and the other windows are a mix of sashes and casements. The garden is surrounded by a brick coped wall about 6 feet (1.8 m) high, and in the northeast corner is a square summerhouse with a round-arched doorway.	II
Church House; 52.95196°N 0.94783°W		1845	A school and teacher's house, probably designed by Scott and Moffatt, it is in Gothic Revival style, and has since been used for other purposes. The building is in brick with diapering, on a chamfered plinth, with chamfered eaves, and tile roofs with coped gables, kneelers, and terracotta finials and crosses. It has one and two storeys, and an irregular L-shaped plan, with a front of four bays. On the front is a projecting gabled wing with a porch in each angle.	II
65 and 67 Long Acre; 52.95109°N 0.94972°W	—	Mid 19th century	A house on a corner site with an attached outbuilding converted for residential use, it is in colourwashed brick on a brick plinth, with a floor band, rebated eaves, and a hipped and gabled roof. There are two storeys, the house has three bays on the front, a rounded corner, and a single bay on the right return, and the outbuilding is lower with two bays. The central doorway in the house has pilasters, a rectangular fanlight, a hood on curved brackets, and a shoe scraper to the left, and the windows are sashes. The outbuilding contains a plain doorway, a shop window, and casement windows.	II
Market Cross; 52.95235°N 0.95195°W		1861	The market cross is in sandstone, and has an octagonal plan with a roof of Westmorland slate. It consists of an eight-bay arcade with moulded pointed arches, on circular columns with moulded capitals and bases. The spandrels contain quatrefoils with monograms, there is ball flower decoration, and the eaves are moulded, and have leaf carving and text. On the top is an octagonal lantern with quatrefoil windows, four gabled and crested lucarnes, and a lead roof with an elaborate finial cross.	II
Two telephone kiosks 52.95255°N 0.95200°W	—	1935	The two K6 type telephone kiosk in Market Place were designed by Giles Gilbert Scott. Constructed in cast iron with a square plan and a dome, they have three unperforated crowns in the top panels.	II
