= John Brown (cricketer, born 1862) =

English cricketer

John Brown (1862 – unknown) was an English first-class cricketer active 1888 who played for Nottinghamshire. He was born in Bingham.
