= Hayward (profession) =

Parish officer of the English Middle Ages

Hayward, or "hedge warden", was an officer of an English parish dating from the Middle Ages in charge of fences and enclosures; also, a herdsman in charge of cattle and other animals grazing on common land. Their main job was to protect the crops of the village from livestock.

In Sussex and Surrey the form Haybittle occurs (from Old French, haia, enclosure and Anglo-Saxon bydel, bailiff). This has survived as a locally common surname, especially in and around Reigate.
