= Stafford Castledine =

English cricketer

Personal information
- Full name: Stafford William Thomas Castledine
- Born: 10 April 1912; Bingham, Nottinghamshire, England
- Died: 17 April 1986 (aged 74); Nottingham, Nottinghamshire, England
- Batting: Right-handed
- Bowling: Slow left-arm orthodox

Domestic team information
- Years: Team
- 1933–1934: Nottinghamshire

Career statistics
Competition	First-class
Matches	5
Runs scored	22
Batting average	3.14
100s/50s	–/–
Top score	15
Balls bowled	24
Wickets	–
Bowling average	–
5 wickets in innings	–
10 wickets in match	–
Best bowling	–
Catches/stumpings	6/–
- Source: Cricinfo, 5 October 2010

Stafford William Thomas Castledine (10 April 1912 – 17 April 1986) was an English cricketer. Castledine was a right-handed batsman who bowled slow left-arm orthodox. He was born in Bingham, Nottinghamshire.

Castledine made his first-class debut for Nottinghamshire against the touring West Indians in 1933. His debut in the County Championship came when Nottinghamshire played Warwickshire in 1934 County Championship. During the 1934 season, he represented the county in 3 further first-class matches, the last of which came against Sussex. In his 5 first-class matches, he scored 22 runs at a batting average of 3.14, with a high score of 15. In the field he took 6 catches.

He died at Nottingham on 17 April 1986.
