= Jonathan Stenner =

English cricketer and gastroenterologist

Personal information
- Full name: Jonathan Maurice Crathorne Stenner
- Born: 18 January 1966 (age 60); Bingham, Nottinghamshire, England
- Batting: Right-handed

Domestic team information
- Years: Team
- 1987: Cambridgeshire
- 1988: Cambridge University

Career statistics
Competition	First-class
Matches	1
Runs scored	23
Batting average	11.50
100s/50s	–/–
Top score	13
Catches/stumpings	–/–
- Source: Cricinfo, 21 July 2019

Jonathan Maurice Crathorne Stenner (born 18 January 1966) is an English gastroenterologist and a former first-class cricketer.

Stenner was born in January 1969 at RAF Newton near Bingham, Nottinghamshire. He studied medicine at Magdalene College, Cambridge. While studying at Cambridge, he made a single appearance in first-class cricket for Cambridge University against Yorkshire at Fenner's in 1988. Batting twice in the match, Stenner was dismissed for 10 runs in the Cambridge first-innings by Phil Carrick, while in their second-innings he was dismissed for 13 runs by David Towse. In addition to playing first-class cricket, he also played minor counties cricket for Cambridgeshire in 1987, making a single appearance in the Minor Counties Championship. After graduating from Cambridge, he became a doctor. Stenner currently practices as a consultant gastroenterologist at the East Surrey Hospital.
