= Morris Gelsthorpe =

English Anglican bishop and missionary

The Right Reverend Morris Gelsthorpe DSO
- Bishop in the Sudan
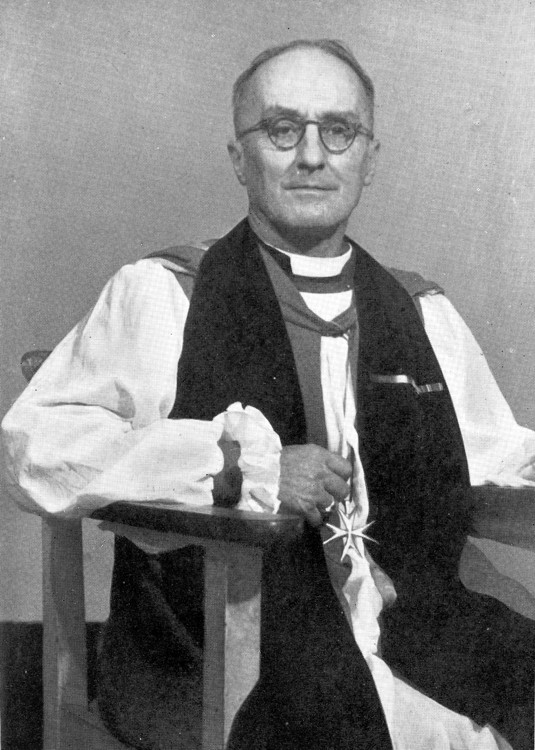
- Bishop Gelsthorpe, 1945
- Diocese: Diocese of the Sudan
- In office: 1945 to 1952
- Other post: Assistant Bishop of Southwell (1952–1968)

Orders
- Ordination: 1920 by Hensley Henson
- Consecration: 1933

Personal details
- Born: Alfred Morris Gelsthorpe; 26 February 1892
- Died: 22 August 1968 (aged 76)
- Education: The King's School, Canterbury; Hatfield College, Durham
- Military career
- Allegiance: United Kingdom
- Branch: British Army
- Service years: 1914–1919
- Rank: Lieutenant Colonel
- Units: Artists Rifles; Durham Light Infantry; Machine Gun Corps
- Conflicts: First World War

Alfred Morris Gelsthorpe DSO (26 February 1892 – 22 August 1968) was an English Anglican bishop and missionary who served as the first Bishop in the Sudan.

== Early life ==
He was educated at The King's School, Canterbury and matriculated to Hatfield College, Durham (part of Durham University) as an arts student in October 1911.

=== Military service ===
In September 1914, not long after the outbreak of the First World War, Gelsthorpe, who had been an active member of the Durham University Officers' Training Corps in his time as a student, enlisted initially as a regular soldier in the Artists Rifles, but then received a commission the following month and transferred to the 8th battalion of the Durham Light Infantry as second lieutenant.

He served on the Western Front in France, May 1915–September 1916, and April–September 1917; then in Mesopotamia, September 1917–January 1919. He received the Distinguished Service Order on attachment to the Machine Gun Corps and was twice mentioned in despatches. He finished the war with the rank of lieutenant colonel, despite his youthfulness.

== Ordained ministry ==
After returning from the war, he returned to Durham University to study theology and was awarded a Licentiate of Theology (LTh). He was made a deacon in the Church of England in 1919, and was ordained by the new Bishop of Durham, Hensley Henson, in 1920.

Gelsthorpe began his ecclesiastical career with a curacy at St Gabriel’s, Sunderland. In 1923 he became a CMS Missionary and moved to Awka in Colonial Nigeria. A popular minister in Sunderland, before his departure he received the gift of a watch from the committee of Sunderland Rugby Club.

He was Principal of the Staff Training College for African Agents in Awka from 1926 to 1933; Assistant Bishop to the Bishop on the Niger from 1933 to 1938, and Assistant Bishop to the Bishop of Egypt from 1938 to 1945. He was Bishop in the Sudan from 1945 to 1952; Rector of Bingham, Nottinghamshire from November 1952 to 1963, and an Assistant Bishop of Southwell from November 1952.

== Personal ==
Gelsthorpe claimed to have a "special interest" in all athletics. He was particularly active in rugby and competed for Blackheath Rugby Club as a youth, later representing Durham County during his university studies.

In 1949 he married Dr Elfrida Whidborne of the Church Missionary Society Hospital in Omdurman.
