= Timeline of Newcastle upon Tyne =

The following is a timeline of the history of the city of Newcastle upon Tyne in Tyne and Wear, England (before 1974 it was part of Northumberland)

== 2nd Century ==
=== 120s ===
- 120-122
  - Pons Aelius small Roman fort and bridge was established

== 11th Century ==
=== 1070s ===
- 1072
  - According to the Chronicles of the Monk of Tynemouth, King William, returning from Scotland, encamped a large army on the River Tyne near Newcastle, which had formerly been known as Monkchester
- 1073
  - Aldwin, Prior of Winchcombe, along with two monks from Evesham, visited Monkchester

=== 1080s ===
- 1080
  - Robert Curthose, on return from an expedition in Scotland, laid the foundation of a wooden 'new castle' to defend the Tyne crossing at Newcastle, from which the town took its name

=== 1090s ===
- 1091
  - St Nicholas' Church was founded by Osmund, Bishop of Salisbury
- 1092
  - William Rufus had the castle at Newcastle rebuilt in stone
- 1095
  - Castle at Newcastle was captured during a revolt by Norman barons, but later retaken by William Rufus

== 12th Century ==
=== 1130s ===
- 1135
  - King Henry I granted a charter to Newcastle including rights and freedoms to encourage its growth and development
- 1136
  - King David I of Scotland invaded Northumbria, capturing Wark, Norham, Alnwick and Newcastle, all of which he later gave up
- 1138
  - King David I of Scotland again invaded, capturing the same places as taken in earlier campaigns
- 1139
  - Under the terms of the Treaty of Durham, Northumberland, with the exception of Newcastle and Bamburgh, was ceded to Scottish rule

=== 1140s ===
- 1149
  - Newcastle was conceded to the Scots by Henry of Anjou, in return for Scottish support

=== 1160s ===
- 1168
  - Burgesses of Newcastle fined 20 marks for making a knight swear (ie submit to the old fashioned process of compurgation)

=== 1170s ===
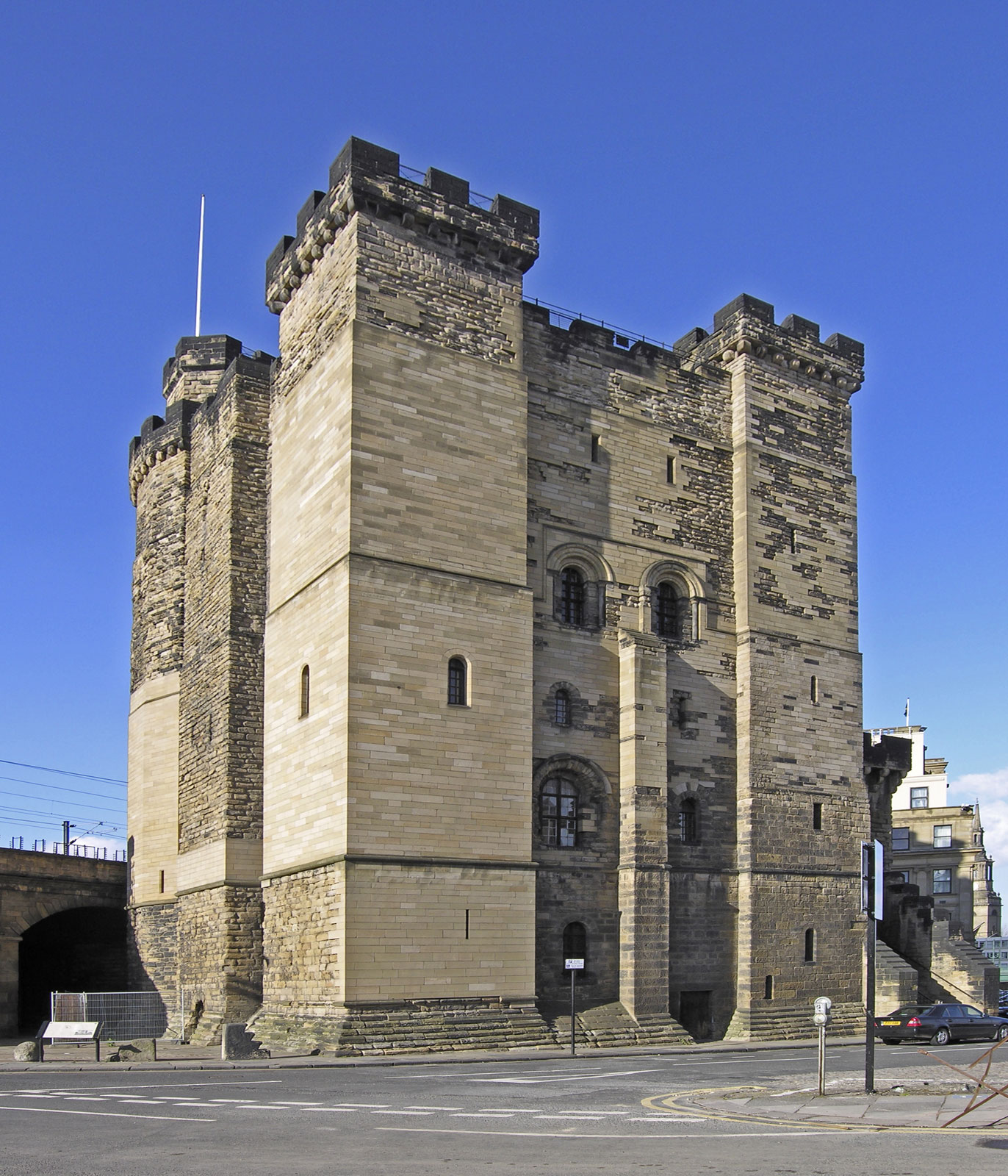
Newcastle Castle in 2005

- 1172
  - Construction of The Castle, Newcastle, a stone castle with rectangular keep was begun, with £166 4s expended in the first year, according to documents in the Record Office, London
- 1173
  - In expectation of a siege by William the Lion of Scotland, £5 was spent laying in stores and provisions
  - Expenditure on construction of the castle was £250 5s 4d
- 1174
  - William the Lion of Scotland laid siege to Newcastle, but was unable to take it
  - Expenditure on construction of the castle was £12 15s 10d
- 1175
  - Expenditure on construction of the castle was £186 15s 4d
- 1176
  - Expenditure on construction of the castle was £144 15s 4d, and it was finally completed

== 13th Century ==
=== 1210s ===
- 1213
  - King John granted a charter under which the burgesses of Newcastle would be confirmed in perpetuity at an advanced fee-farm annual rent of £100 to be paid direct to the Crown, not to the Sheriff of Northumberland as before
- 1216
  - 28 January: A charter granted by King John to Newcastle burgesses confirmed the liberties and free customs they had enjoyed in the time of his ancestors
  - The first use of the title Mayor of Newcastle was recorded when Daniel, son of Nicholas, was called mayor
  - The old church of St Nicholas was destroyed by fire

=== 1230s ===
- 1235
  - King Henry III granted to the burgesses of Newcastle the right to exclude Jews and gave permission to mine for coal in the castle fields
- 1239
  - A drought of three months in Newcastle was followed by three months of rain leading to many deaths

=== 1240s ===
- 1240
  - Grey Friars were established in Newcastle
- 1244
  - King Henry III came to Newcastle with a large army on his way to attack Alexander II of Scotland

Black Gate in 2007

- 1245
  - Peter Scott became Mayor of Newcastle (until 1251)
- 1247
  - Construction of the Black Gate at The Castle, Newcastle began, at an eventual cost of £513 15s 11d
- 1247-1257
  - William Heron of Ford was Sheriff of Northumberland and governor of the Castle at Newcastle
- 1248
  - After fire destroyed the wooden bridge over the River Tyne, and much of the borough, a new stone bridge was eventually constructed

=== 1250s ===
- 1250
  - Construction of the Black Gate at The Castle, Newcastle completed, at an eventual cost of £513 15s 11d
- 1251
  - Sir Peter Scott, Mayor of Newcastle, granted land to the Dominicans on which Blackfriars was built
- 1253
  - King Henry III granted to the burgesses of Newcastle permission to elect their own coroners
- 1255
  - Walter of Kirkham, Bishop of Durham granted an indulgence of 20 days to anyone who would contribute to the repair of the bridge over the Tyne
- 1257
  - The Archbishop of York granted an indulgence of 30 days to anyone contributing to repair of the bridge over the Tyne

=== 1260s ===
- 1262
  - Carmelite friary founded in Newcastle
- 1265
  - Work started on the building of a town wall for Newcastle
  - King Henry III licensed the collection of a toll by the burgesses of Newcastle towards the cost of building the town wall
- 1267
  - Friars of the Sack granted a site in Newcastle
  - In a dispute over coal rights, Mayor Richardson of Newcastle and the rest of the corporation sailed down the Tyne to North Shields and burnt it down

=== 1280s ===
- 1281
  - At an inquisition in Newcastle the fee-farm for burgesses was doubled to £200, attributed to the prosperity the coal trade had brought to the town
- 1282-85
  - Roger Paytevin was keeper of the bridge, a collector of murage and a town bailiff

=== 1290s ===
- 1290
  - Austin Friars erected a house on the east bank of the Eric Burn in Newcastle
- 1292
  - John Balliol, King of Scotland, did homage for his crown to King Edward I in the castle at Newcastle
  - Newcastle was second only to London in the export of leather
- 1295
  - Hugh Carliol, a former Mayor of Newcastle, and Peter Graper, were Newcastle's representatives as Members of Parliament
- 1296
  - King Edward I passed through Newcastle with an army of some 34,000 against revolt of John Balliol
  - According to the Lay Subsidy Roll, Newcastle was divided into wards named by parish - St Nicholas, St Andrew and St John
- 1297
  - William Wallace laid waste to Northumberland from Hexham up to the walls of Newcastle
- 1299
  - 20 December: A charter was granted by King Edward I to allow the incorporation of the village of Pandon into Newcastle, extending the riverfront eastward to a burn called The Swirl. It was purchased from Lord Robert de Byker and his wife, Ladararia (whose inheritance it was)
  - The burgesses of Newcastle received authority to collect further tolls towards the building of the town wall

== 14th Century ==
=== 1300s ===
- 1300
  - The population of Newcastle was approximately 7,000-8,000
- 1305
  - The right hand quarter of the executed William Wallace was exhibited at the gateway on the Newcastle side of the bridge
- 1307
  - Work began anew on building the east walls of Newcastle
  - White Friars were rehoused in the almost empty house of the Friars of the Sack
  - King Edward I arrived in Newcastle with an army
- 1309
  - The burgesses of Newcastle received authority to collect further tolls towards the building of the town wall

=== 1310s ===
- 1311
  - King Edward II took refuge in Newcastle Castle from the Duke of Lancaster
  - The burgesses of Newcastle received authority to collect yet further tolls towards the building of the town wall
- 1317
  - Grevious famine and mortality in Newcastle

=== 1320s ===
- 1320
  - Floods swept away 140 houses in Newcastle
- 1322
  - A quarter of the body of the executed Andrew Harclay, 1st Earl of Carlisle was exhibited in Newcastle
- 1325
  - The export of coal from Newcastle is mentioned in a petition to Parliament in which Thomas Rente of Pontoise states that he loads his ship with wheat for Newcastle and returns with coals

=== 1330s ===
- 1333
  - 28 January: King Edward III, at York, granted a petition to the men of Newcastle that their Mayor should hold the office of Kings's escheator
- 1334
  - King Edward III received the homage of Edward Balliol at the Blackfriars, the Dominican Friary in Newcastle
  - Roger Mauduyt was Sheriff of Northumberland and reported that the Castle in Newcastle was 'decayed and left to neglect'
- 1339
  - A flood swept away the greater part of the stone bridge at Newcastle and killed 167 people

=== 1340s ===
- 1341
  - Troops of John de Warenne, 7th Earl of Surrey damaged Blackfriars priory and caused further damage more widely in the town
- 1342
  - February: The burgesses of Newcastle drew up a set of articles for better government of the town
  - October: The set of articles drawn up for better government received Royal assent and King Edward III renewed the charter of Newcastle after a period of suspension
  - King David II of Scotland laid siege to Newcastle, but the town was successfully defended by Lord John Neville of Hornby
  - Richard Action defeated John Denton in a contested election for Mayor of Newcastle
  - There were 12 trade guilds in Newcastle
- 1345
  - Newcastle was visited by a pestilence which lasted two years
- 1349
  - Successive outbreaks of plague led to the halving of the population
  - Fire nearly destroyed the whole town

=== 1350s ===
- 1350
  - The Burgesses of Newcastle received Royal licence to dig and take stones in certain lands outside the walls
- 1353
  - Newcastle became one of ten Staple towns, an Act of Parliament decreeing that 'no wools of growth in Northumberland, Cumberland, Westmorland, Durham, Richmond and Allerton, should be shipped anywhere but Newcastle'
- 1358
  - A barbican was added in front of the Black Gate, but no trace remains

=== 1360s ===
- 1360
  - Trinitarians established a house in Newcastle, founded by William de Alton
- 1363
  - Frost began in mid-September in Newcastle and lasted until the following April
- 1369-71
  - Stephen Whytgraff was bailiff in Newcastle

=== 1370s ===
- 1375
  - John Horton was Bailiff in Newcastle
- 1377
  - Poll tax returns recorded 2,647 people over the age of 14 in Newcastle, which suggested a total population estimated at 3,500-4000 inhabitants
  - Robert Raynton was Bailiff in Newcastle

=== 1380s ===
- 1380
  - Newcastle town petitioned the Crown for financial relief as so much of the population had been lost to plague outbreaks
- 1383
  - King Richard II visited Newcastle
  - John Neville of Raby was appointed by the King to inspect the condition of Newcastle in terms of both men and fortifications
  - Robert Oliver was Mayor of Newcastle and represented Newcastle in Parliament
- 1384
  - Stephen Whytgraff was Mayor of Newcastle
- 1385
  - In his capacity as Mayor, Stephen Whytgraff represented Newcastle in Parliament
- 1385-87
  - Robert Raynton was Bailiff in Newcastle
- 1388
  - After Parliament had passed an Act to improve sanitary conditions, a writ for better sanitation was directed at the bailiffs of Newcastle and a proclamation made about the casting of filth into rivers
  - Robert Raynton became Mayor of Newcastle
  - Robert Oliver was collector of the King's customs in Newcastle
- 1389
  - John Horton was Mayor of Newcastle
- 1389-90
  - Stephen Whytgraff was collector of the King's customs in Newcastle

=== 1390s ===
- 1393
  - John Horton was Bailiff in Newcastle
- 1394
  - Stephen Whytgraff and his wife Mary founded the chantry of St Margaret in St Nicholas' Church

== 15th Century ==
=== 1400s ===
- 1400
  - The population of Newcastle was estimated as 3,000 inhabitants
  - King Henry IV visited Newcastle and granted county status to the town, separating the town, but not the Castle and its precincts, from the county of Northumberland, with the right to appoint its own sheriff. Newcastle was the fourth town in England to receive this mark of favour after London, Bristol and York
- 1408
  - A quarter of the body of the executed Earl of Northumberland was put on display in Newcastle

=== 1410s ===
- 1412
  - Maison Dieu, or St Catherine's Hospital, was founded in Sandhill, Newcastle, by Roger Thornton, for the support of nine poor men and four poor women

=== 1420s ===
- 1429
  - Roger Thornton bequeathed £2 to the 'lepremen' of Newcastle

=== 1430s ===
- 1433
  - The King remitted 'all kinds of taxes' to the burgesses of Newcastle due to the 'grevious losses of shipping and merchandise at sea' and the scarcity of inhabitants due to plague

=== 1440s ===
- 1442
  - 10 October: Barber-Surgeons and Chandlers' Company of Newcastle agreed to 'uphold the light of St John the Baptist in St Nicholas' Church as long as they are of ability'
- 1444
  - King Henry VI exempted the county borough from the jurisdiction of the Admiral of England

=== 1460s ===
- 1461
  - King Edward IV visited Newcastle
- 1462-63
  - John de Mowbray, 4th Duke of Norfolk overwintered in Newcastle supplying the armies of Richard Neville, 16th Earl of Warwick
- 1465
  - Richard Neville, 16th Earl of Warwick came to Newcastle for negotiations with a Scottish delegation

=== 1480s ===
- 1480
  - Newcastle mercers, wool merchants and corn merchants guilds were merged as the Merchant Adventurers
- 1487
  - King Henry VII resided for several weeks in Newcastle

=== 1490s ===
- 1490
  - King Henry VII conceded the right for Newcastle to hold a second fair on 18 October, known as St Luke's Fair
- 1492
  - King Henry VII granted to the Society of Masters and Mariners, a charter of incorporation of The Trinity House Fellowship of Newcastle and the Guild and Fraternity of the Blessed Trinity then acquired Dalton Place in Broad Chare as a meeting place for Trinity House
- 1494
  - The last constable at The Castle, Newcastle, Roger Fenwick, was appointed

== 16th Century ==
=== 1500s ===
- 1505
  - The Guild and Fraternity of the Blessed Trinity altered their premises in Broad Chare to provide a hall of assembly, chapel and lodgings for poor brethern

=== 1510s ===
- 1516
  - A Star Chamber decree allowed the inclusion of colliers and keelmen among the crafts of the town

=== 1520s ===
- 1525
  - Thomas Horsley was Mayor of Newcastle
- 1527
  - Sir Humphrey Lisle escaped from prison in The Castle, Newcastle
- 1529
  - Sir Humphrey Lisle returned to Newcastle where he was captured and hanged

=== 1530s ===
- 1530
  - Newcastle was granted a monopoly in the export of coal from the region
- 1532
  - Robert Brandling was Mayor of Newcastle
  - Thirty Armstrong Reivers were hanged at the Westgate gallows and their severed heads displayed on the castle walls
- 1533
  - Thomas Horsley was Mayor of Newcastle
- 1536
  - King Henry VIII granted the Guild and Fraternity of the Blessed Trinity a charter of incorporation allowing them to elect a master and wardens and erect two lighthouses in North Shields, as well as power to exact a toll of 4d from each foreign ship and 2d from each English ship coming to Newcastle
- 1537
  - Sir Ralph Sadleyr was sent by Thomas Cromwell to report on the state of Newcastle and reported that it was a "strong town" and complimented its defences
- 1539
  - January: The five friaries in Newcastle were dissolved and taken over by the Crown
  - At the end of the year severe frost set in which lasted until the following February in Newcastle
  - Muster roll returns recorded 1,907 able-bodied men in Newcastle, about one-fifth of the population, which suggested a total population of about 10,000 inhabitants

=== 1540s ===
Blackfriars in 2011

- 1540
  - The nunnery of St Bartholomew in Newcastle was dissolved and taken over by the Crown
- 1544
  - Blackfriars bought by Newcastle Corporation
- 1547
  - Edward Seymour, 1st Duke of Somerset made Newcastle his base during his campaign against the Scots
  - The Company of Hostmen, or Merchant's Company, was incorporated by charter of King Henry VIII
- 1548
  - William Dent purchased the former Trinitarians house of St Michael
- 1549
  - Riverfront was extended east to Ouseburn when the town absorbed the Ballast Shores
  - The incorporation of Byker into Newcastle was authorised

=== 1550s ===
- 1550
  - John Knox moved from Berwick-upon-Tweed to Newcastle where he remained for about two years
- 1552
  - Blackfriars was leased to nine local craft guilds
- 1553
  - Newcastle secured an Act in Parliament incorporating Gateshead into Newcastle, later repealed
- 1554
  - The Bishop of Durham had to cede quayside facilities in Gateshead to the mayor and corporation of Newcastle
- 1557
  - A decree of the Privy Council was made on the regulation of craft guilds in Newcastle

=== 1560s ===
- 1561
  - John Wilkinson was Mayor of Newcastle
- 1563
  - Newcastle population was approximately 7,000-8,000
- 1564
  - The Company of Merchant Adventurers of Newcastle made it an offence for any of its members to employ as apprentices anyone from the reivers strongholds of Tynedale or Redesdale

=== 1570s ===
- 1576
  - Newcastle petitioned the Crown for possession of Gateshead on the grounds of the disorder across the river
- 1579
  - Over 2,000 people died of pestilence in Newcastle

=== 1580s ===
- 1580
  - Richard Anderson purchased the former Grey Friars house and the former nunnery of St Bartholomew
  - The Guild and Fraternity of the Blessed Trinity was empowered to charge a toll of 1s for each foreign ship and 4d for each English ship coming to Newcastle
- 1581
  - William Jenison was Mayor of Newcastle
- 1582
  - William Dent passed on the Trinitarians house of St Michael to Newcastle corporation
- 1584
  - The Guild and Fraternity of the Blessed Trinity was refounded by Queen Elizabeth I as the Master, Pilots and Seamen of the Trinity House of Newcastle upon Tyne
  - William Jenison became Member of Parliament for Newcastle upon Tyne
- 1589
  - Over 1,800 people died of pestilence in Newcastle
  - A charter of Queen Elizabeth I confirmed all existing rights of Newcastle and brought the Castle into the control of the Corporation

=== 1590s ===
- 1590
  - The Castle, Newcastle was described as: 'a place of refuge for thieves and vagabonds fleeing from the justice of the town'
- 1593
  - Two seminary priests, Joseph Lampton and Edward Waterson were executed in Newcastle
- 1594
  - Seminary priest John Ingram was executed in Gateshead and his quartered body was brought to Newcastle
- 1595
  - Plague hit Newcastle and lasted until 1597

== 17th Century ==
=== 1600s ===
- 1600
  - 22 March: A charter of Queen Elizabeth I incorporated the guild or fraternity of Hostmen, giving members a monopoly of the sale of coal and grindstones from the Tyne, as well as a monopoly of municipal government and economic life
  - A charter refounded the Grammar School in Newcastle as the Free Grammar School of Queen Elizabeth
- 1603
  - 9-13 April: King James I stayed in Newcastle on his journey south
- 1604
  - King James I modified a previous charter of Queen Elizabeth I confirming the government of the borough in the hands of a Mayor, Sheriff, 10 Aldermen and a 24 person council
- 1605
  - The Castle, Newcastle was let to the Incorporated Company of Tailors
- 1606
  - A King James I charter to the Masters, Pilots and Seamen of the Trinity House of Newcastle upon Tyne defined the tolls and fees they could levy on all ships entering or leaving the Tyne for pilotage, upkeep of buoys and beacons etc, as well as for the keeping of 12 poor brethren and the relief of shipwrecked mariners

=== 1610s ===
- 1610
  - John Speed's map of Newcastle was published
- 1611
  - King James I gave his aid to the refounding of a hospital in Newcastle
- 1614
  - July: A Commission for 'conservancy of the river' (Tyne) was established by Order in Council made up of the Corporation of Newcastle, the Bishop of Durham and justices of the peace for the two counties (Durham & Northumberland)
- 1615
  - The glass trade was established in Newcastle
- 1617
  - King James I again visited Newcastle and stayed for a fortnight
  - Newcastle secured the whole authority for conservancy of the Tyne, vested in the Mayor, six aldermen and certain members of the Merchant Company and Trinity House
- 1618
  - The Castle, Newcastle, with the exception of the parts used as a Moot Hall and the County Prison, were granted on lease to Andrew Stevenson
- 1619
  - Glass industry on the River Tyne established on the ballast shore near the mouth of the Ouseburn

=== 1620s ===
- 1620
  - An inquest revealed that piled up against the Castle wall and threatening its structure was a dunghill 98 yards long, 32 yards broad and 10 yards high

=== 1630s ===
- 1632
  - The building of a lime kiln and the refusal to hear complaints presented in open guild, led to rioting among apprentices (Resly's Rebellion)
- 1633
  - June: King Charles I paid his first visit to Newcastle on his way to Edinburgh to be crowned King of Scotland and had a Tyne river trip on the Mayor's barge
- 1634
  - A lieutenant from Norwich said of Newcastle 'we found the people and the streets of Newcastle much alike, neither sweet nor clean'
- 1635
  - Sir William Brereton described Newcastle as 'beyond all compare the fairest and richest town in England'
- 1636
  - Death toll in Newcastle from the plague was 5037, an estimated 47% of the population
- 1637
  - Dr R Jenison of All Hallows published a treatise entitled 'Newcastle's Call' stating that the plague was 'from God's Justice and Wisdom'
- 1638
  - King Charles I ordered the fortification of the town against the Scots
- 1639
  - King Charles I arrived in Newcastle leading an army to destroy Scottish Covenanters
  - The 'Town Clerk's Office' was destroyed by fire

=== 1640s ===
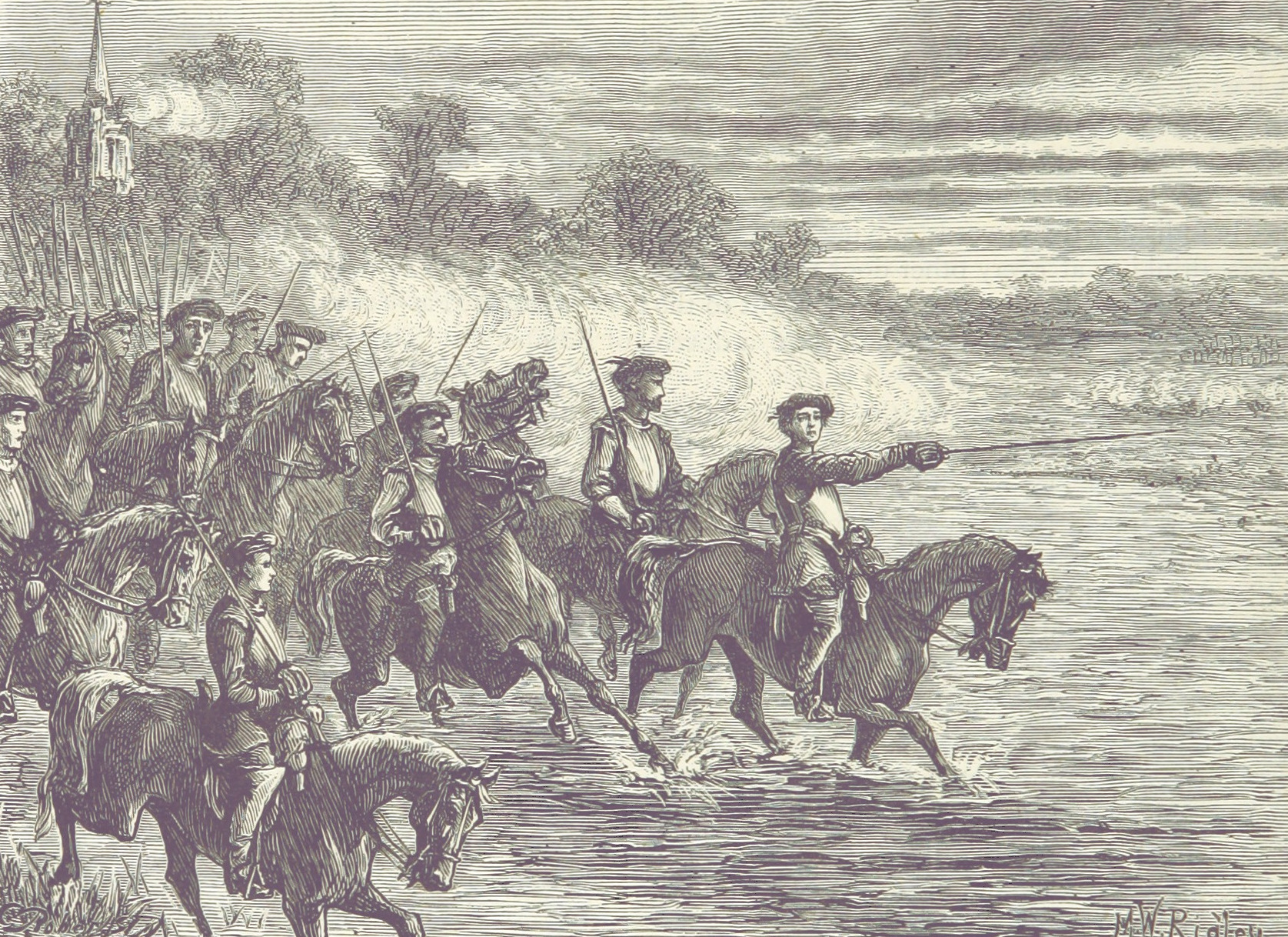
Scots passage of Newburn Ford by Matthew White Ridley, 1873

- 1640
  - 28 August: At the Battle of Newburn the Scots army under Colonel Leslie defeated the King's forces and thereafter occupied Newcastle
- 1641
  - August: Scots army left Newcastle after which the Government indemnified the town for its losses with a grant of £60,000
- 1644
  - January: Scots army crossed into Northumberland
  - 3-22 February: General Leslie (now Earl of Leven), laid siege to Newcastle, only to withdraw the bulk of his army after three weeks, marching by way of Ebchester to Sunderland
  - July: General Leslie again besieged Newcastle, which held out for three months under the leadership of Mayor Sir John Marley
  - 13 August: While Newcastle was besieged by the Scots, General Leslie was quartered in Elswick and the Earl of Callendar at Gateshead
  - 19 October: Siege ended when the walls were breached and Newcastle fell to the Scots assault
- 1646
  - 13 May: King Charles threw himself on the protection of the Scottish army which brought him to Newcastle where he was held for nine months
- 1647
  - 30 January: Scots withdrew from Newcastle
  - 5 October: The townspeople of Newcastle drew up "a petition of the mayor and burgesses of Newcastle against the oppression of the soldiery under the command of his Excellency Sir Thomas Fairfax, now resident here"
  - 3 November: King Charles was given up by his captors in Newcastle to the Commissioners of the English Parliament
  - 'Grassmen' were appointed to take care of the Town Moor
  - Sir Arthur Haselrig was appointed as governor of Newcastle
- 1648
  - A ropemakers guild was established in Newcastle
  - Breaches in the town wall made by the Scots were repaired by Sir Arthur Haselrig, governor of Newcastle
- 1649
  - William Grey, the first historian of Newcastle, published his Chorographia or survey of the town

=== 1650s ===
- 1650
  - 15 July: Oliver Cromwell and his army arrived in Newcastle before marching on to Scotland
  - 300,000 tons of coal were exported to London from Newcastle
- 1654
  - Wenceslaus Hollar's map of the River Tyne was published
- 1655
  - Work started constructing a new Guildhall and Exchange in Sandhill (completed 1658)
  - Ralph Gardiner of Chirton, Northumberland, published a pamphlet "England's grievance discovered in relation to the coal trade, the tyrannical oppression of the magistrates of Newcastle, their charters and grants, the several traits, depositions and judgements obtained against them"
- 1657
  - Robert Trollope was awarded the freedom of the corporation of Newcastle upon Tyne
  - George Fox, founder of the Quakers, visited Newcastle
- 1658
  - New Guildhall and Exchange in Sandhill was opened

=== 1660s ===
- 1663
  - Newcastle population was approximately 13,000
- 1665
  - Some 41% of homes in Newcastle were defined as being 'in poverty'

=== 1680s ===
Holy Jesus Hospital in 2014

- 1681
  - Holy Jesus Hospital in the Manors was founded and endowed by Newcastle Corporation to provide accommodation in old age or poverty for 39 freemen or their widows
- 1682
  - A municipal school was started at St Ann's Chapel by the mayor and corporation of Newcastle
- 1688
  - The electors of Newcastle returned Alderman William Hutchinson as Mayor and Alderman Matthew Partiss as Sheriff

=== 1690s ===
- 1691
  - Construction of the Mansion House in the Close, for the Mayor's official residence, was completed
- 1696
  - Lort Burn, which flowed along the Side, was arched over and a paved roadway constructed as a major improvement in the residential part of Newcastle
- 1698
  - July: Celia Fiennes visited Newcastle and described it as 'a noble town'
  - Society of Friends moved to a meeting house in Pilgrim Street, Newcastle

== 18th Century ==
=== 1700s ===
Keelman's Hospital in 2010

- 1700
  - Newcastle upon Tyne was the fourth largest English town
- 1701
  - Keelman's Hospital was erected by the keelmen of Newcastle at a cost of £2000 raised mainly from their own contributions
- 1706
  - Two thirds of the 1,862 coastal shipments from Newcastle were bound for London
- 1709
  - Newcastle investors owned 11,500 tons of shipping, nearly 4% of national shipping capacity, only exceeded by London, Scarborough and Bristol

=== 1710s ===
- 1711
  - 'The Newcastle Courant' was established as the first newspaper in Newcastle
- 1712
  - The Brethern of Trinity House founded a school in Newcastle

=== 1720s ===
Mark Akenside. Engraving from 1795 by P Audinet

- 1721
  - Mark Akenside born in Butcher Bank, Newcastle upon Tyne
- 1722
  - Horse races moved from Killingworth to the Town Moor, Newcastle upon Tyne
- 1723
  - James Corbridge published a 'Map of Newcastle upon Tyne'
- 1727
  - Daniel Defoe described Newcastle as 'not the pleasantest place in the world to live in', partly due to the 'smoke of the coals'
  - Unitarian chapel was opened in Hanover Square, Newcastle

=== 1730s ===
- 1730
  - Barber-Surgeon's Hall rebuilt in the Manors at the expense of the surgeons
- 1736
  - The widow of Henry Bourne had his 'History of Newcastle upon Tyne' published
  - Charles Avison was appointed organist at St Nicholas' Church and began the first public subscription concerts in Newcastle
  - A new Assembly Room was opened in the Groat Market, Newcastle
- 1739
  - Newcastle Journal newspaper was first published
- 1739-40
  - The winter was so severe in Newcastle that many of the poor would have died had not Alderman Riley allowed them free coal supplies

=== 1740s ===
- 1740
  - The Guildhall, Newcastle upon Tyne suffered serious damage during riots in the town
- 1742
  - 30 March: John Wesley preached at Sandgate, Newcastle
  - May: John Wesley, accompanied by John Taylor, preached at Sandgate, Newcastle
  - 20 December: John Wesley laid the first stone for a church, the Wesley Orphan House, in Northumberland Street, Newcastle, the second Methodist chapel to be built in England
  - Charles Wesley preached for some weeks in Newcastle
- 1744
  - Presbyterians converted a malt-loft in Silver Street, Newcastle, into a place of worship
- 1745
  - 15 September: A letter was signed by 813 people in Newcastle declaring against the Pretender
  - 8 November: General Wade held a review of his army of 15,000 men on the Town Moor
  - 'Newcastle Courant' advertised cockfighting at John Dawson's pit near Newgate
- 1746
  - Joseph Barber established a library at Amen Corner, Newcastle, with over 5,000 volumes
  - Prince William, Duke of Cumberland passed through Newcastle on his way north to Scotland in pursuit of Jacobites

=== 1750s ===
- 1751
  - April: A small group of professionals in Newcastle opened a public subscription for building of a General Infirmary
  - May: A house in Gallowgate was fitted out for reception of patients as a General Infirmary
  - September: Newcastle Corporation offered a permanent site for a General Infirmary on Forth Banks and building work was begun
  - Newcastle investors owned 21,600 tons of shipping, nearly 5% of national shipping capacity
  - A 'Race Week' was first held on the Town Moor, Newcastle upon Tyne
  - An Act of Parliament was obtained for the construction of a new road, known as the Military Road, between Carlisle and Newcastle and construction was begun
- 1752
  - 21 August: Richard Brown, a keelman, was hanged in Newcastle for murdering his daughter
  - 8 October: General Infirmary in Newcastle was opened with 90 beds
- 1753
  - Oliver Goldsmith was held for two weeks in Newgate Gaol in Newcastle, on suspicion of travelling to join the French army
- 1754
  - 19 August: Dorothy Catinby was hanged in Newcastle for the murder of her illegitimate children
- 1755
  - Ralph Carr founded the first bank in Newcastle, the oldest provincial bank in England except for Nottingham
- 1757
  - William Charnley established a circulating library in Newcastle
  - Construction of the Military Road between Carlisle and Newcastle was completed
- 1758
  - 8 August: Alice Williamson, aged 68, was hanged in Newcastle for burglary
  - Susannah Fleming was sentenced to stand for an hour in the pillory at White Cross in Newgate Street, Newcastle, for fortune-telling
- 1759
  - 4 June: John Wesley in his Journal wrote of Newcastle 'I know no place in Great Britain comparable to it for pleasantness'

=== 1760s ===
- 1760
  - June: A new public garden was opened near the town - New Ranelagh Gardens
  - December: A lying-in hospital for poor married women was opened in Rosemary Lane, Newcastle
  - A school was established in Newcastle by Charles Hutton
  - The number of surgeons at the General Infirmary was increased from two to four to cope with demand
- 1761
  - A charity was founded for attending poor women in Newcastle and Gateshead lying-in at their own homes
  - A subscription was opened for the levelling and enclosing of St Nicholas' churchyard
- 1763
  - September: Streets within the town walls were lighted by public oil lamps
  - Town Guard was established in Newcastle
  - Commission for lighting and watching the streets of Newcastle (within the town walls) was appointed, employing 26 watchmen as night police
  - Demolition of the Newcastle town wall began with a section of wall bordering the Quay between Bridge End and Sandgate, after complaints from merchants that it impeded the loading and unloading of ships and narrowed the Quayside
  - The first attempt to light the town by means of candles was made, with a rate of 6d in the £ levied for the purpose
- 1764
  - Newcastle Chronicle newspaper was founded in Newcastle
  - Work began on construction of the Church of St Annes, City Road, Newcastle, designed by William Newton
- 1765

Customs House in 2021

  - A new Presbyterian meeting house was opened in High Bridge, Newcastle
- 1766
  - May: Tobias Smollett visited Newcastle
  - A new Customs House, Newcastle upon Tyne was built near the middle of the Quayside
- 1767
  - First local public asylum for the pauper lunatics of Northumberland, Durham and Newcastle upon Tyne was erected by public subscription in Warden's Close, Newcastle
- 1768
  - January: Magistrates ordered removal of the Bull-baiting ring in Sandhill, Newcastle, after a man was killed by a bull
  - October: The earliest recorded course of lectures was given in Newcastle, by 'a celebrated astronomer'
  - Church of St Annes, City Road, Newcastle, designed by William Newton, was completed
- 1769
  - Two ventilators were in action at Walker Colliery 'by the help of the fire-engine' (a Newcomen atmospheric engine).

=== 1770s ===
- 1770
  - Dispensary founded in the Side, Newcastle
  - Population of Newcastle estimated to be about 24,000
  - Work began on construction of Charlotte Square, Newcastle's first completed Georgian square, designed by William Newton
  - Arthur Young described the turnpike road between Carlisle and Newcastle as 'a more dreadful road cannot be imagined'
- 1771

Plaque on Bessie Surtees House in 2006

  - 17 November: The Great Flood of 1771 saw the collapse of part of the then Tyne Bridge and its eventual demolition
- 1772
  - Bessie Surtees eloped with John Scott, later Lord Eldon
- 1773-81
  - A new bridge over the River Tyne was built, a low stone bridge of nine arches
- 1773
  - 11 August: Samuel Johnson arrived in Newcastle on his way to join James Boswell for their tour of Scotland
- 1774
  - 27 June: John Wesley wrote in his journal describing Newcastle as 'this lovely place and people'
  - Assembly Rooms in Westgate Road were opened, designed by William Newton
  - Saville Row in Newcastle was built
- 1775
  - May: James Boswell visited his mentally unstable brother in a private asylum in Spital Tongues, Newcastle
  - The earliest debating society in Newcastle, The Philosophical Society, is founded
- 1776
  - March: James Boswell again visited his brother in Spital Tongues
  - A man was executed by hanging at the West Gate, Newcastle, for highway robbery and another hung on the Town Moor for stealing from the mail
- 1777
  - A Dispensary was founded in Newcastle
- 1778
  - CT Middleton published a geography of Newcastle describing it as: "an ancient, large, disagreeable and dirty town, but exceedingly populous and very rich"

=== 1780s ===
- 1780
  - William Newton remodelled Heaton Hall (now demolished) for Sir Matthew White Ridley
- 1781
  - Public Medical Baths founded in Newcastle
  - New stone bridge over the River Tyne was completed
- 1783
  - The names of streets were put up for the first time in Newcastle
- 1784-86
  - Mosley Street, Newcastle was constructed
- 1784
  - Rev William Turner, pastor of the Unitarian church in Hanover Square, Newcastle opened two Sunday schools
- 1786
  - Work started on construction of All Saints' Church designed by David Stephenson
  - The weekly mail coach from Edinburgh to London began to be routed through Newcastle
- 1787
  - Over 7,000 miners worked in and around Newcastle
  - John Howard visited the gaols of Newcastle and was disgusted with conditions in the county gaol
  - Dean Street, Newcastle was constructed over the Lort Burn
- 1788

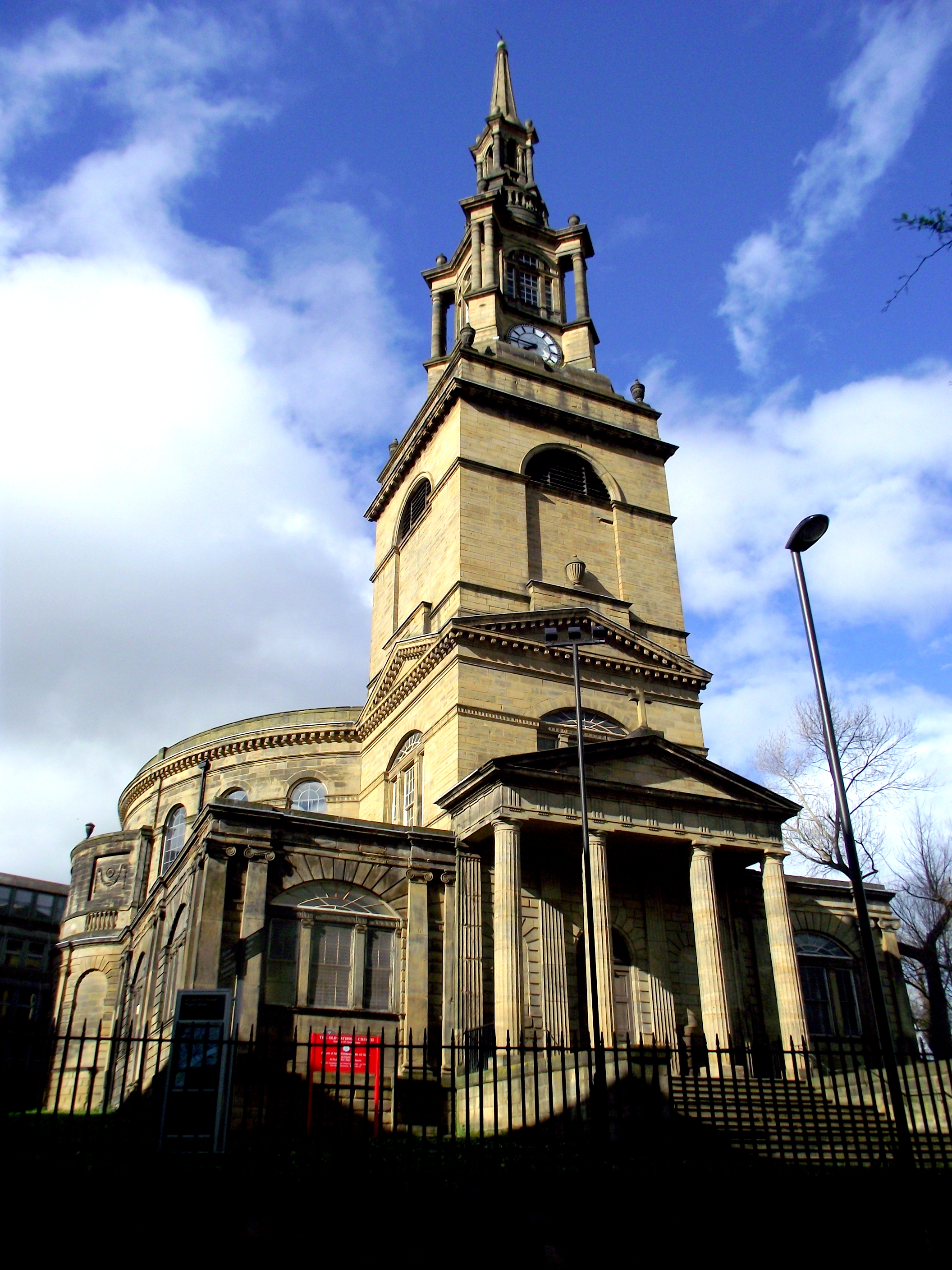
All Saints Church in 2014

  - 'Newcastle Advertiser' newspaper first published
  - Theatre Royal, Newcastle in Mosley Street was opened, with a production of the comedy 'The Way to Keep Him'
- 1789
  - Construction of All Saints' Church was completed
  - John Brand published his 'History & Antiquities of the town and county of Newcastle upon Tyne'
  - At Newcastle Assizes a man was charged with manslaughter in a tavern brawl, fined 6s 8d and discharged

=== 1790s ===
- 1790
  - Dispensary moved to St John's Lodge, in Low Friar Street, Newcastle
  - Newcastle had 20 printers, 12 booksellers and stationers, 13 bookbinders and 3 engravers (one of whom was Thomas Bewick)
  - Use of the pillory was finally discontinued in Newcastle
  - At Newcastle Assizes a woman charged with stealing a handkerchief was sentenced to seven years transportation
- 1792
  - St Andrews' School for Girls was opened in Percy Street, Newcastle
- 1793
  - Literary and Philosophical Society of Newcastle upon Tyne founded as a 'conversation club' by William Turner and others
- 1795
  - January: William Wordsworth was in Newcastle to visit his sister
- 1795-98
  - Pandon Gate, Close Gate and Sand Gate on Newcastle town wall were demolished
- 1796
  - Walker Alkali Co was founded by William Losh
  - The north front of the Guildhall, Newcastle upon Tyne was remodelled for Newcastle Corporation to designs by William Newton and David Stephenson
- 1798
  - Literary and Philosophical Society of Newcastle upon Tyne moved to the old Assembly Rooms in Groat Market
  - Roman Catholic church of St Andrew was opened in Pilgrim Street, Newcastle
- 1799
  - 3 January: An 'Armed Association' was formed for the defence of Newcastle under the command of Sir Matthew White Ridley, with its colours presented by his wife at Nun's Field
  - Thomas Bewick joined the Literary and Philosophical Society of Newcastle upon Tyne
  - Methodists of the New Connection opened Bethel Chapel in Manor Chare, Newcastle
  - There were 320 keels operating on the River Tyne

== 19th Century ==
=== 1800s ===
- 1800
  - Newcastle was the ninth largest town in England
  - Phineas Crowther, an engineer from Newcastle, invented a vertical winding engine subsequently in widespread use in colleries in the North-East of England
  - A committee of local gentry had a grandstand erected on the Town Moor for viewing the horse racing
- 1801
  - Rev John Baillie published his 'An Impartial History of Newcastle upon Tyne'
  - The bridge over the River Tyne had become too narrow for the volume of traffic and was widened to designs by David Stephenson
  - In the first Census in the United Kingdom Newcastle had a population of 28,294
  - Between 30 and 40 benefit societies for working men were in operation in Newcastle
- 1802
  - 'Tyne Mercury' newspaper first published in Newcastle
  - Literary and Philosophical Society of Newcastle upon Tyne began to arrange a regular series of lectures
- 1802-11
  - Pilgrim Street Gate, postern gate and West Gate on Newcastle town wall were demolished
- 1803
  - William and John Stokoe designed Elswick Hall for industrialist John Hodgson
  - John Bell opened a second-hand bookshop in Quayside, Newcastle
- 1804
  - Typhus or Fever Hospital built in Warden's Close, Newcastle
- 1805
  - The population of Newcastle was estimated to be about 35,000
  - The Society of Friends built a meeting house in Pilgrim Street, Newcastle
- 1806
  - James Losh established an alkali works at Walker, Newcastle upon Tyne
- 1807
  - Fenham Barracks built on part of the Town Moor, Newcastle upon Tyne
  - Rev John Hodgson published his 'Picture of Newcastle upon Tyne'
- 1808
  - An extensive new Flesh Market was opened in Newcastle
- 1809
  - As part of the celebration of King George III's jubilee in Newcastle, ten debtors were released from prison by public subscription
  - The old Moot Hall in Newcastle was demolished

=== 1810s ===
- 1810-12
  - The town wall from Pilgrim Street Gate to Carliol Tower was demolished to make way for New Bridge Street, as well as the wall from Wall Knoll to Sand Gate

Moot Hall in 2016

- 1810
  - 22 July: Foundation stone of Moot Hall, Newcastle upon Tyne, designed by John Stokoe, was laid by Earl Percy and construction commenced
  - The corporation of Newcastle purchased the Castle and started to restore it
  - Collingwood Street was built linking Mosley Street and Westgate Road, Newcastle
  - Royal Jubilee School was opened in Newcastle
- 1811
  - Newcastle Unitarians founded the Jubilee School for the Children of the Poor
  - Part of Newcastle town wall between Pilgrim Street Gate and Carliol Tower was demolished to make way for New Bridge Street
- 1812
  - The authority of the Commission for lighting and watching was extended to the suburbs of Newcastle with an additional 30 watchmen employed
  - The second edition of John Hodgson's 'Picture of Newcastle upon Tyne' was published
  - New Bridge Street was opened in Newcastle
  - The building of the Moot Hall, Newcastle upon Tyne was sufficiently advanced for Assizes to be held there for the first time
  - Royal Jubilee School for Girls was opened in Newcastle
- 1813-14
  - Winter frost set in for two months in Newcastle, covering the river with ice ten inches thick
- 1813
  - The Society of Antiquaries of Newcastle upon Tyne was founded
  - Wesleyan Methodists completed a chapel in New Road, Newcastle
- 1814
  - Lock Hospital founded in a house near the Pink Tower in Newcastle
- 1815
  - Chamber of commerce established in Newcastle upon Tyne.
- 1816
  - Richard Grainger set up his own business
- 1817
  - Robert Hawthorn founded an engineering works on Forth Banks(1818 according to another source)
- 1818
  - 13 January: The first gas lamps were lit in Mosley Street, Newcastle, watched by a large crowd
  - Robert Hawthorn opened a small engineering shed on Forth Banks, Newcastle(1817 according to another source)
  - Gas was adopted for street lighting by arrangement between the Commission for lighting and watching and the Newcastle and Gateshead Gas Company
- 1819
  - 11 October: Protest meeting against the Peterloo Massacre and in favour of universal suffrage and annual Parliaments, took place on the Town Moor, Newcastle upon Tyne with 75-100,000 in attendance

=== 1820s ===
- 1820

Brunswick Methodist Church in 2010

  - Robert Hawthorn was joined by his brother, William, as a partner, to form R and W Hawthorn
- 1821
  - February: The Methodist Brunswick Place Chapel was opened
  - In the Census in the United Kingdom Newcastle had a population of 35,181
- 1822
  - George Wilson, then aged 56, took up a challenge to walk 90 miles in 24 hours on the Town Moor, succeeding with 14 minutes to spare in front of a crowd of 40,000
  - During another strike by keelmen the Riot Act was read in Newcastle
  - 'Archaeologica Aeliana' first published by the Society of Antiquaries of Newcastle upon Tyne
- 1823
  - Robert Stephenson and Company founded on Forth Banks to build railway locomotives(1824 according to another source)
  - Newgate on Newcastle town wall was demolished
- 1824
  - Newcastle Corporation took possession of the asylum for pauper lunatics of Northumberland, Durham and Newcastle upon Tyne and leased it to Dr Noel Smith
  - A company registered in the name of Robert Stephenson opened in Forth Street, Newcastle, to build railway locomotives (1823 according to another source)

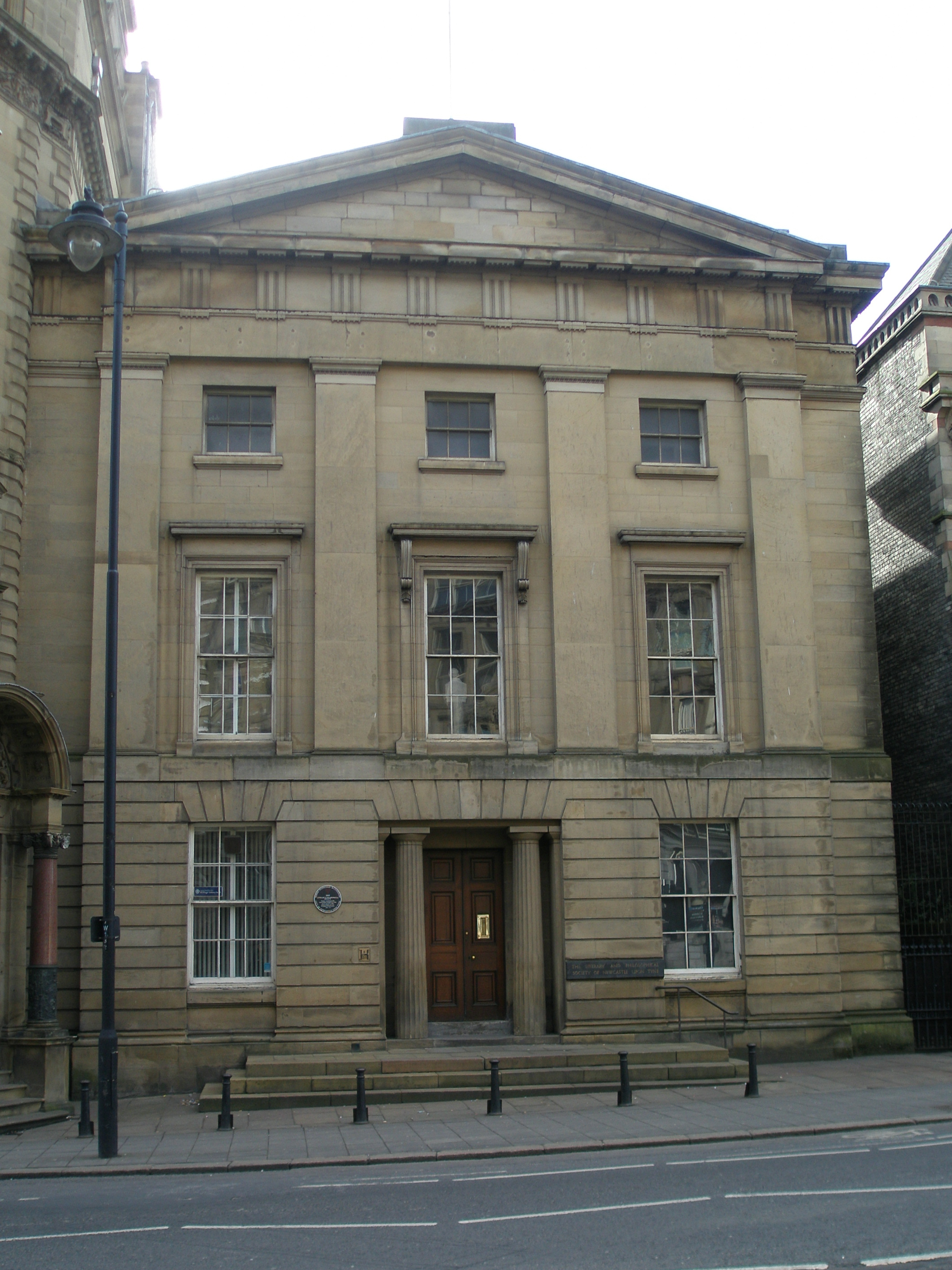
Literary & Philosophical Society in 2008

  - Parade Ground renamed Haymarket, Newcastle
  - Newcastle Mechanics Institute was founded
- 1825
  - Building for the Literary and Philosophical Society of Newcastle upon Tyne completed on Westgate Road, Newcastle, designed by John Green
- 1825-31
  - Eldon Square was built on the northern side of Blackett Street, Newcastle, designed by John Dobson
- 1827
  - Eneas Mackenzie published his 'History of Newcastle upon Tyne'
  - Medieval St Thomas' Chapel was demolished
- 1827-1830
  - Church of St Thomas the Martyr, Newcastle built at Barras Bridge, designed by John Dobson
- 1829
  - St Nicholas' Church clock first lit by gas, watched by a large crowd
  - Cemetery at Arthur's Hill was laid out
  - Flesh Market was renamed to Cloth Market
- 1829-34
  - Leazes Terrace was built, designed by Thomas Oliver

=== 1830s ===
Church of St Thomas the Martyr in 2018

- 1830
  - Cattle market was opened west of the Forth, Newcastle
  - The medieval Chapel of St Thomas at Bridge End, Newcastle, was demolished
  - The Church of St Thomas the Martyr at Barras Bridge, Newcastle, was consecrated
  - A music hall was built in Blackett Street, Newcastle
- 1831
  - 17 October: A crowd of 50,000 at Cow Hill, Newcastle, protested about the Reform Act
  - In the Census in the United Kingdom the population of Newcastle was 53,613, but voting was restricted to only 3,000 freemen
  - Richard Grainger started construction of the Royal Arcade at the foot of Pilgrim Street, Newcastle, designed by John Dobson
- 1831-32
  - An outbreak of Cholera in Newcastle killed 306 people
- 1832
  - November: The first attempt to establish a professional constabulary was made by Newcastle authorities amid public disquiet
  - Richard Grainger purchased Anderson Place and estate in Newcastle for £50,000, razed it to the ground, then arched over the Lort Burn which ran past it and filled its valley in
  - Construction of the Royal Arcade was completed
  - Newcastle School of Medicine and Surgery was founded
  - William Wordsworth was in Newcastle when he was shown 'the magnificent buildings which adorn our town' by John Hernaman, editor of the 'Newcastle Journal'
- 1833
  - September: Professional constabulary withdrawn due to public clamour

Richard Grainger in an 1840 portrait

- 1834
  - 6 May: The last of the River Tyne state (or Mayoral) barges was launched by Messrs John Oliver at South Shields
  - 24 May: Richard Grainger first exhibited his plans for the improvement of Newcastle
  - Newcastle School of Medicine and Surgery leased Surgeon's Hall, Newcastle
- 1835
  - October: Grainger Market was opened in Newcastle
  - There were 2,485 borough voters in Newcastle
  - Municipal Corporations Act 1835 established Newcastle City Council and extended the boundaries of the city to include Elswick, Westgate, Jesmond, Heaton and Byker
  - Neville Street in Newcastle was constructed
  - Newcastle School of Medicine and Surgery recognised by the College of Surgery and the University of London
- 1836
  - May: Professional constabulary in Newcastle permanently established
  - The Chief Constable reported that there were 71 brothels and 46 houses of ill-repute in Newcastle
  - Charles Dickens was in Newcastle for the first performance of his 'The Village Coquettes'
  - Upper Dean Street was renamed Grey Street in honour of Charles Grey, 2nd Earl Grey
  - The original Theatre Royal in Mosley Street was demolished
  - A Tyne 'River Improvement Committee' was established
- 1837
  - October: Northern Liberator newspaper was founded by Newcastle Chartists

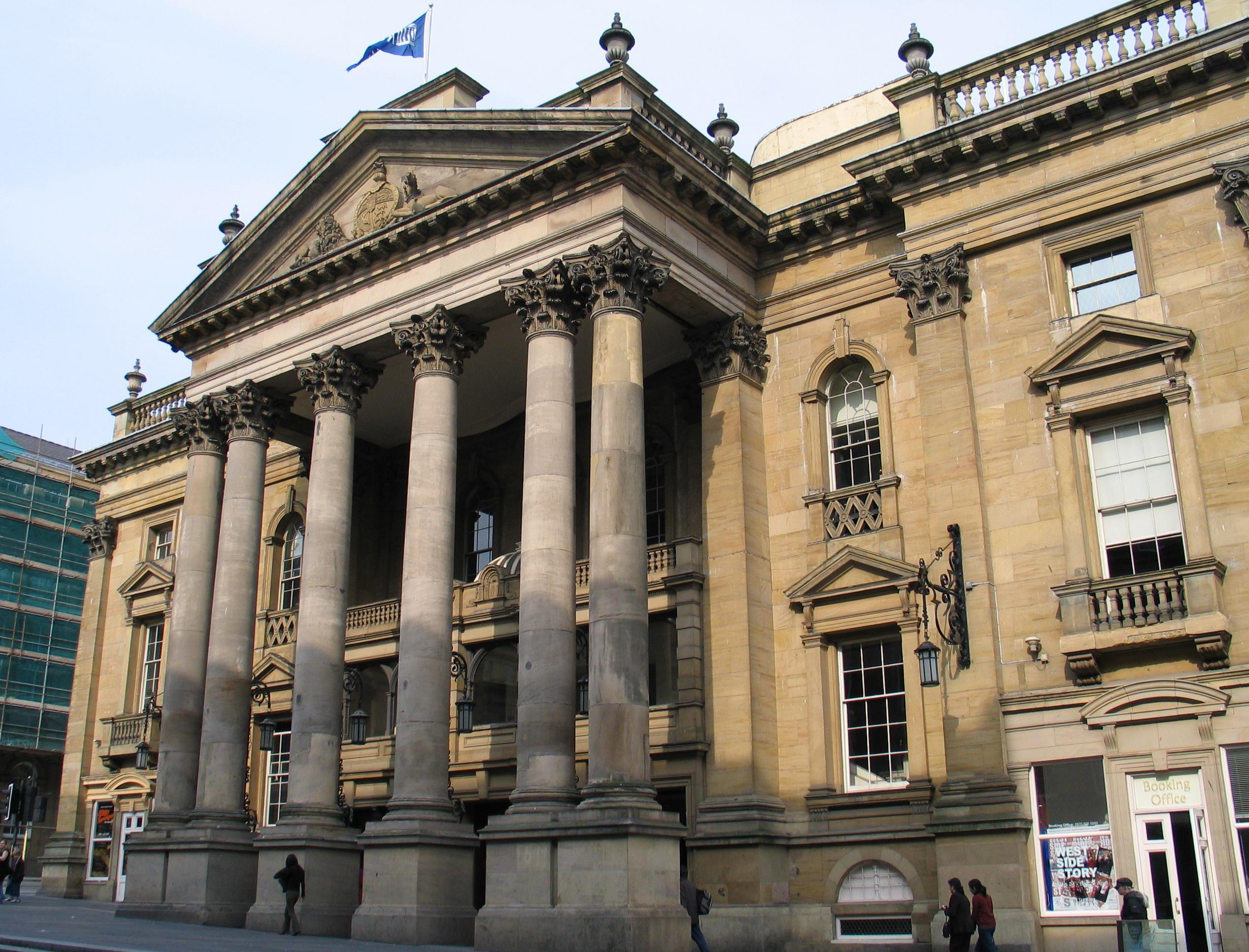
Theaatre Royal in 2006

  - Magistrates' court transferred from the Mayor's Chamber in the Guildhall to a new police station behind the Holy Jesus Hospital in the Manors, Newcastle
  - Old Mansion House in the Close sold by auction
  - New Theatre Royal, Newcastle opened, designed by John and Benjamin Green
- 1838
  - 18 June: A through railway line from Redheugh to Carlisle was opened
  - 25 June: Northumberland Plate horse race took place for the first time on the Town Moor, Newcastle upon Tyne

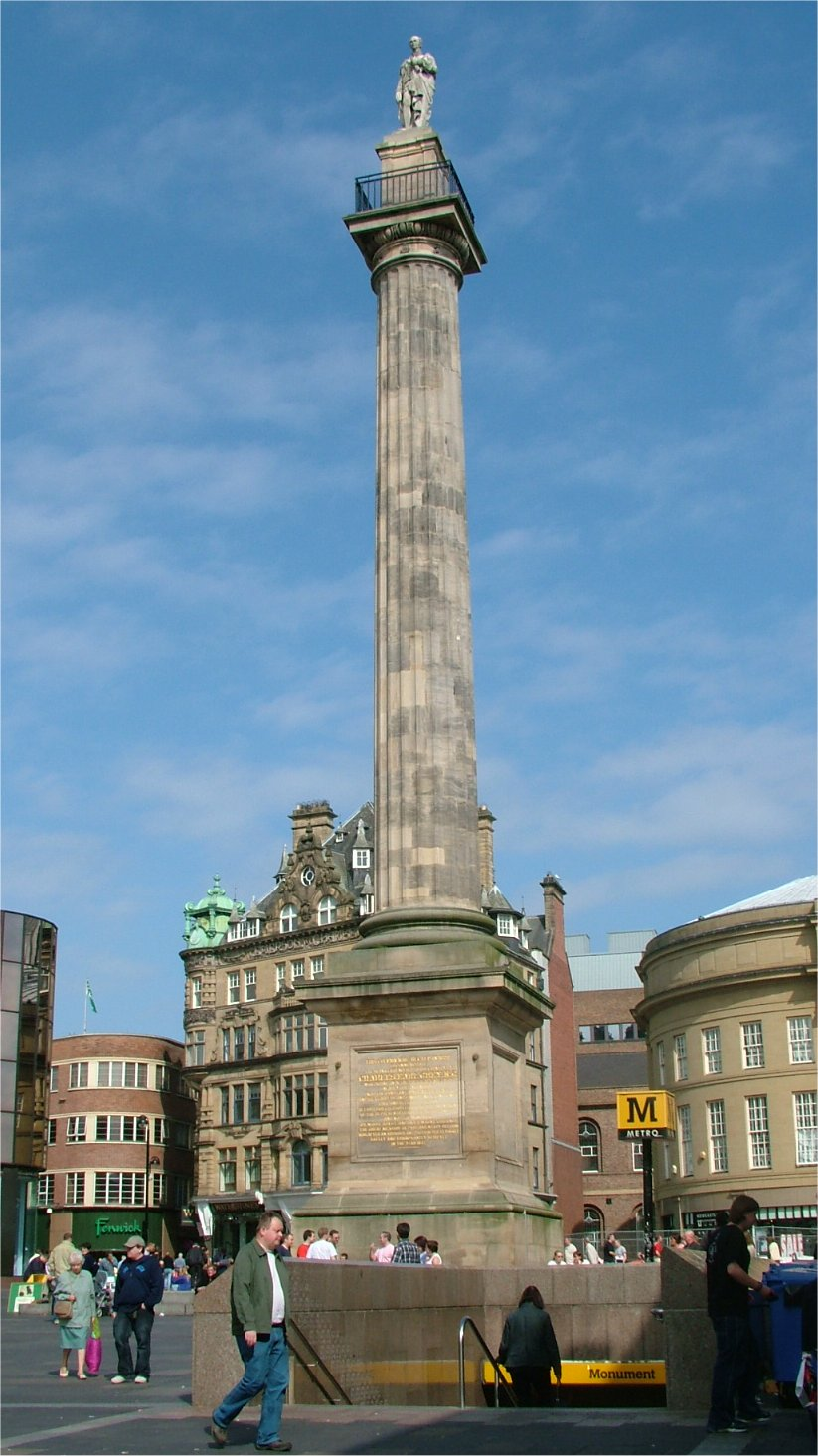
Grey's Monument in 2004

  - August: Grey's Monument completed in Newcastle in honour of Charles Grey, 2nd Earl Grey, designed by Benjamin Green
  - 19 September: A synagogue was opened in Temple Street, Newcastle
  - Railways reach Newcastle with the opening of the Newcastle and Carlisle Railway
  - Bainbridge drapery store opened in Newcastle, possibly the first department store in England
  - Middle Street in Newcastle was demolished
  - Primitive Methodist Church in Silver Street moved to a new church built for them by Richard Grainger in Nelson Street, Newcastle
  - John Collingwood Bruce gave a series of lectures in Newcastle on the Roman Wall
  - A music hall was built in Nelson Street, Newcastle, to replace a previous one in Blackett Street
  - The eighth annual meeting of the British Association for the Advancement of Science was held in Newcastle
  - Harriet Martineau attended a meeting of the British Association in Newcastle
- 1839
  - 20 May: A large Chartist demonstration was held on the Town Moor, Newcastle upon Tyne, presided over by Thomas Hepburn, with an estimated 70-100,000 in attendance
  - 20 August: There were riots in the Side by Chartist supporters
  - 30 August: Disorder broke out in the Forth and the Riot Act had to be read four times
  - Newcastle Chartists opened a joint-stock provision in the Side, although it only lasted for two years
  - First Redheugh Bridge was built
  - Newcastle and North Shields Railway was completed

=== 1840s ===
- 1840
  - Charles Coutts established a shipbuilding yard at Walker, Newcastle upon Tyne
- 1841
  - August: A branch of the Anti–Corn Law League was established in Newcastle
  - Population of Newcastle upon Tyne was 31,000
- 1842
  - June: There were 3,468 men unemployed in Newcastle, their families (8,124 women and children), being in destitution
  - The first Tyne-built iron steamer the 'Prince Albert' was launched at Coutts shipyard in Walker, Newcastle upon Tyne
- 1844
  - June: The last link in railway communication between Newcastle and London was completed with the opening of the Newcastle and Darlington Junction Railway
  - 7 July: The last mail coach ran from Newcastle to London, due to the advent of the railways
- 1845
  - The widening of Neville Street, Newcastle, saw the destruction of many buildings
  - A separate force of river police was established
  - There were 10-12 fire engines in Newcastle, but none were owned by the Corporation
- 1846-50
  - First phase of Newcastle railway station was built, designed by John Dobson
- 1846
  - July: Electrical telegraph adopted by the Newcastle and Darlington Junction Railway
- 1847
  - 5 July: The last mail coach ran from Newcastle to Edinburgh, due to the opening of railway between Newcastle and Berwick-upon-Tweed
  - WG Armstong & Co founded at Elswick, Newcastle upon Tyne, on a 5.5 acre site, to build the hydraulic machinery Armstrong had invented
  - John Dobson restored the late 12th-century keep of The Castle, Newcastle
  - Work started on construction of the High Level Bridge
- 1848
  - Public baths and wash houses for the poor were erected in New Road, Newcastle, by the corporation
- 1849
  - High Level Bridge over the River Tyne designed by Robert Stephenson was opened
  - There was a cholera outbreak in Newcastle
  - J & G Joicey company was founded on Forth Banks, Newcastle
  - Thomas Oliver's map of Newcastle was published

=== 1850s ===
- 1850
  - The River Tyne Improvement Act established a Conservancy Commission to replace the traditional control by Newcastle Council
  - 25 August: Queen Victoria formally opened the High Level Bridge and Newcastle railway station
- 1851
  - January: Newcastle railway station received its first train from across the High Level Bridge
  - In the Census in the United Kingdom the population of Newcastle was 87,784
- 1852
  - 27 August: Charles Dickens was in Newcastle acting in three plays at the Assembly Rooms, in which Wilkie Collins took part
  - There were 4,363 borough voters in Newcastle
  - The Pink Tower was demolished
- 1853
  - An outbreak of cholera in Newcastle killed 1,527 people
  - Newcastle upon Tyne Church of England Institute was founded
- 1854
  - Several railway companies serving Newcastle were merged to form the North Eastern Railway, including the Newcastle and Berwick Railway
  - The Great fire of Newcastle and Gateshead followed an explosion and fire at Gateshead, which spread to the Quayside, and killed 53 people, destroyed the homes of 800 families and damaged many properties, clearing a long stretch of river frontage in Gateshead and Newcastle
- 1855
  - Work started on construction of new town hall in St Nicholas Square, Newcastle
  - Sandgate area of the Quayside destroyed by fire
- 1856
  - The shipbuilding yard of Charles Coutts in Walker, Newcastle upon Tyne was closed
- 1857
  - Petition presented to Newcastle Corporation for the creation of a park in Newcastle to be 'a free and open place of recreation for the people of the city'
- 1858
  - New town hall and corn exchange in St Nicholas Square/Groat Market completed for Newcastle corporation
- 1858-61
  - Jesmond Parish Church was built, designed by John Dobson
- 1858-63
  - Newcastle Town Hall was built, designed by John Johnstone
- 1859
  - Newcastle Chronicle newspaper was bought by Joseph Cowen

=== 1860s ===
- 1860
  - John Wigham Richardson opened the Neptune shipbuilding yard at Walker, Newcastle upon Tyne, taking over the former Charles Coutts yard
- 1861
  - Charles Dickens gave readings at the Gaiety Theatre in Nelson Street, Newcastle
  - In the Census in the United Kingdom the population of Newcastle was 109,108
- 1862
  - 2 October: Monument to George Stephenson unveiled at Neville Street/Westgate Road, Newcastle, following a march in his memory by 10,000 people
- 1862-63
  - WG Armstrongs was the largest engineering employer in Newcastle with 8,534 employed
- 1863
  - A Children's Hospital was built in Hanover Square
- 1865
  - The Tyne Pilotage Act created a new body to examine and licence pilots, with Newcastle-upon-Tyne Trinity House paid compensation for loss of revenue
- 1867
  - Tyne Theatre and Opera House opened on Westgate Road, Newcastle upon Tyne
- 1868-1876
  - The Swing Bridge, River Tyne was constructed by WG Armstrong & Co

=== 1870s ===
- 1871
  - In the Census in the United Kingdom the population of Newcastle was 128,443
  - Police force in Newcastle numbered 160
  - Bath Lane Schools were opened
  - College of Physical Science was opened (later renamed Armstrong College)
- 1872
  - R and W Hawthorn opened a marine engine building works at St Peter's in the east end of Newcastle
- 1873
  - July: First Medical officer of health for Newcastle, Dr Henry Armstrong, was appointed following the 1872 Public Health Act
  - August: First Home Rule Conference was held in Newcastle, hosted by Isaac Butt and attended by Charles Stewart Parnell
  - 23 December: Leazes Park officially opened, as the first public park in Newcastle
  - Death rate in Newcastle was 30.1 per 1000 people, while 24.3 per 10000 was the average for 21 large towns in the United Kingdom
- 1874-79
  - Portuguese writer Eça de Queiroz worked in the Portuguese consular service at 53 Grey Street, Newcastle
- 1875
  - Bandstand built in Leazes Park. Demolished in the 1960s
- 1876
  - The Swing Bridge, River Tyne was opened
- 1876-77
  - Christie's Directory listed 4 shoemakers, 2 tailors and 4 clothes dealers within the Black Gate at The Castle, Newcastle
- 1877
  - Tyne Association F.C. was founded, playing early games at Northumberland Cricket Club
  - Union Club was opened, built by the Newcastle Club Company for 'modern businessmen'
- 1878
  - 18 December: Joseph Swan demonstrated his incandescent carbon lamp to the Newcastle upon Tyne Chemical Society
  - Work began on the building of a horse tram network in Newcastle by the Newcastle and Gateshead Tramways & Carriage Co Ltd
  - Parkland Park Tennis Club was founded in Jesmond with 5 tennis courts and a croquet lawn
  - The Northern Counties Hospital for diseases of the chest, a private charity, opened at 50 Blackett Street, Newcastle
- 1879
  - Joseph Swan demonstrated his incandescent lamp to the Literary and Philosophical Society of Newcastle upon Tyne
  - Tramway extended to Gosforth
  - Tyne Association F.C. entered the FA Cup, but lost 5-1 away to Blackburn Rovers in front of a crowd of 300

=== 1880s ===
- 1880
  - The Newcastle Chamber Music Society was established
  - Newcastle had 25,358 municipal voters
  - New public library opened in New Bridge Street, Newcastle by Alderman Joseph Cowen on the site of the former Carliol Tower
  - The Grandstand committee decided to move horse racing from the Town Moor to Gosforth Park
- 1881
  - Joseph Swan set up a factory in Benwell to produce lightbulbs
  - In the Census in the United Kingdom the population of Newcastle was 145,359
- 1882
  - Newcastle was granted city status
  - John James Fenwick opened Fenwick (department store) in Newcastle
  - Diocese of Newcastle formed with a bishop and cathedral church (St Nicholas)
  - WG Armstrongs merged with Charles Mitchell's shipyard at Low Walker to become Armstrong Mitchells
- 1883
  - John Cuthbert Laird became the first working man to stand for election in Newcastle, winning Elswick ward in a by-election
- 1884
  - Natural History Museum moved to the new Hancock Museum
  - A tennis club was established on the Grainger estate
- 1886
  - Production ceased at the Joseph Swann lightbulb factory in Benwell
  - R and W Hawthorn merged with A. Leslie and Company shipbuilders in Hebburn to become R. & W. Hawthorn, Leslie and Company
- 1888
  - Fleming Memorial Hospital was opened at Moor Edge, Newcastle
  - John Wigham Richardson's Neptune shipyard delivered the 'Alfonso XII', a Spanish passenger liner and troopship
  - Sanderson Home for Destitute and Crippled Children was opened in Newcastle
- 1889
  - Newcastle Electric Supply Company (NESCo) founded by Theodore Merz and Robert Spence Watson
  - During building work on Westgate Road, a possibly Iron Age boat with animal remains, was excavated

=== 1890s ===
- 1890
  - Of the 6,936 children born in the Newcastle upon Tyne registration district, over 1,000 would die before their first birthday
  - John Wigham Richardson's Neptune shipyard completed the 'Hornby Grange', one of the world's first refridgerated cargo ships
- 1891
  - In the Census in the United Kingdom the population of Newcastle was 186,345
  - A golf course was laid out on the Town Moor and became the City of Newcastle Golf Club
  - John H Watson and John T Lunn established the Newcastle Poor Children's Seaside Trips Association
- 1892
  - 9 December: Newcastle East End F.C. and Newcastle West End F.C. merged to form Newcastle United F.C.
  - An artisan golf club was founded at Lockhart's Cocoa Rooms on Clayton Street and played on the Town Moor
- 1893
  - Newcastle upon Tyne Church of England Institute was incorporated
  - Newcastle United F.C. applied to join the Football League Second Division
- 1896
  - St Georges hockey club was founded in Benwell
- 1897
  - A Joint Municipal Reform Committee was established to pursue the municipalisation of public services
  - Armstrong Mitchells merged with the Manchester armaments works of Whitworths to become Armstrong Whitworth
  - Sanderson Home for Destitute and Crippled Children was moved to Salters Road in Gosforth
- 1898
  - Northumberland Golf Club was founded with a new course laid out around the Gosforth Park race course
- 1899
  - 15 March: George Bernard Shaw's play Caesar and Cleopatra was given its copyright performance at the Theatre Royal, Newcastle by Mrs Patrick Campbell's company
  - Whit Monday: Newcastle railway station issued over 33,000 tickets
  - Newcastle had 691 licensed premises - one for every 43 dwellings and every 307 of the population
  - Elswick Harriers was founded
  - The interior of the Theatre Royal, Newcastle was destroyed by fire

== 20th Century ==
=== 1900s ===
- 1900
  - 20 June: The foundation stone for a new Royal Victoria Infirmary was laid by Albert Edward, Prince of Wales
  - Newcastle businessman, Alexander Laing, offered to Newcastle Corporation to fund construction of an art gallery
  - A policeman commandeered a passing car to pursue a drunk on a horse
  - There were 39,136 municipal voters in Newcastle
  - WG Armstrong died, at which point his engineering works stretched over 230 acres and employed 25,000 men
- 1901
  - In the Census in the United Kingdom the population of Newcastle was 215,328
  - Electric trams introduced in Newcastle
  - Theatre Royal, Newcastle reopened with a new interior designed by Frank Matcham
  - Cathedral Buildings in Dean Street was built
- 1902
  - Morpeth To Newcastle Road Race was officially started
  - John Wigham Richardson's Neptune shipyard delivered the 'Colonia', its first cableship
  - Armstrongs built a batch of motor-driven vehicles at Elswick, small vans which ran on paraffin
- 1903
  - John Wigham Richardson's shipbuilding company merged with Swan Hunter in Wallsend to become Swan Hunter and Wigham Richardson
  - The Rutherford Memorial Fountain was moved from St Nicholas' Square to Bigg Market
  - Collingwood Buildings in Collingwood Street was completed for Barclays Bank
- 1904
  - October: Laing Art Gallery opened in New Bridge Street, Newcastle. First art gallery in Newcastle upon Tyne
  - Suburban train lines to the coast were electrified
  - Tram line opened to the park gates at Gosforth Park
  - Benwell, Fenham and Walker were incorporated into Newcastle
  - Hawthorn Leslie's St Peters works began building Parsons turbine engines for ships
- 1905
  - Milburn House built in Newcastle by Alderman JD Milburn
- 1906
  - 10 July: King Edward VII Bridge was opened by King Edward VII, designed by Charles A Harrison
  - 11 July: Royal Victoria Infirmary was opened by King Edward VII
  - City of Newcastle Golf Club moved from the Town Moor to land in north Gosforth
  - First council housing scheme opened in Walker, Newcastle upon Tyne with 112 two-roomed and 14 one-roomed dwellings
  - Armstrongs began full scale production of motor cars with a factory opened in their Scotswood works
- 1907
  - 13 April: The battlecruiser HMS Invincible was launched at the Elswick shipyard of Armstrong Whitworth watched by over 12,000 people
- 1908
  - Frank Melville of Elswick Harriers won the Morpeth To Newcastle Road Race
- 1909
  - Boxing matches started in St James Hall which had a capacity of 3,000

=== 1910s ===
- 1911
  - In the Census in the United Kingdom the population of Newcastle was 266,671
- 1913
  - November: Armstrong Whitworth employed 20,669 people on the Tyne
  - Fenwicks department store had a significant extension
  - Armstrong Whitworth began building aircraft at Gosforth
- 1914
  - Newcastle Co-Operative Society was largest retailer of food in the city
  - By September nearly 2,000 men from Armstrong Whitworth had enlisted in the army, as well as nearly 1,000 from Hawthorn & Leslie
- 1915
  - Minister of Munitions, David Lloyd George, met trade unionists and Arthur Henderson in Newcastle and received 'a most enthusiastic reception'
  - The existing frontage of Fenwick (department store) was built
- 1915-16
  - Newcastle and Tyneside suffered a series of attacks by German Zeppelins
- 1917
  - Tyne Theatre and Opera House closed
- 1918
  - November: Numbers employed by Armstrong Whitworth had risen to just under 60,000
  - Newcastle had 1,954 indoor paupers and 3,126 outdoor paupers
  - St Peters Engine Works (Hawthorn & Leslie) on Forth Banks employed 150 women, some 7% of the workforce
- 1919
  - 19 July: Victory march held in Newcastle with 10,000 troops on parade before an estimated crowd of 250, 000
  - Tyne Theatre and Opera House reopened as The Stoll Picture Theatre
  - Mary Laverick became the first woman councillor elected in Newcastle
  - Newcastle Shipbuilding Company established under the chairmanship of John Crass
  - RG Roberts was appointed as City Housing Architect
  - Reid's 'Plan of Newcastle' was published

=== 1920s ===
- 1920
  - Infant mortality in Newcastle was 101 per 1,000, against a national average of 73 such deaths
  - Whooping cough killed 45 in Newcastle
- 1921
  - In the Census in the United Kingdom the population of Newcastle was 274,955
  - According to the 1921 United Kingdom census one third of the population of Newcastle lived in overcrowded housing
  - Women's football was played during the 1921 Miner's Strike, with Lillian Ritchie scoring 45 goals
- 1923
  - London and North Eastern Railway (LNER) created, merging several railway companies, including the North Eastern Railway
  - Newcastle Schools Athletic Association was reconstituted
  - War memorial (Statue of George and the Dragon) was erected in Eldon Square designed by Charles Leonard Hartwell
- 1924
  - 7 August: Newcastle upon Tyne and Gateshead Corporations (Bridge) Act received Royal assent approving construction of the Tyne Bridge
  - The proposal to build a new road bridge over the Tyne was supported by the local labour exchange to provide work for 50,000 unemployed skilled engineers and shipbuilders
- 1924-28
  - Carliol House was built as the headquarters of the North Eastern Electric Supply Company on the corner of Market Street and Pilgrim Street, Newcastle
- 1925
  - 24 May: The funerals of those killed in the Montague Main Colliery Disaster took place to Elswick cemetery
  - August: Work started on construction of the Tyne BridgeJacobean houses on Quayside were demolished to make way way for the approaches to the bridge.
  - Minister of Health, Neville Chamberlain, toured the 'unhealthy' areas of Newcastle
  - Newcastle Co-Operative Society had 54,000 members
- 1927
  - Newcastle Brown Ale was launched at a cost of 9d per imperial pint
  - Newcastle United F.C. won the 1926–27 Football League First Division championship with an average home crowd of 30,000
  - An appeal raised £143,000 for improvements to Newcastle's Royal Victoria Infirmary
  - Vickers-Armstrongs was created with the merging of Vickers Limited and Armstrong Whitworth
- 1928
  - 25 February: Upper ends of the arch of the Tyne Bridge closed amid celebrations
  - 10 October: Tyne Bridge officially opened by King George V
  - Greyhound racing was introduced to Newcastle at Brough Park, as well as motorcycle speedway
- 1929
  - North East Coast Exhibition took place in Newcastle, with nearly 4.5 million attendees

=== 1930s ===
- 1930
  - 3 September: A Newcastle United club record 68,039 fans crammed into St James' Park for a match against Chelsea
  - St James Hall was rebuilt to increase capacity to 5,000
  - Newcastle General Hospital treated 3,048 patients
- 1931
  - Bessie Surtees House was purchased by SR Vereker, later Viscount Gort, a descendant of Bessie Surtees
- 1931-32
  - Newcastle Co-operative department store built in Newgate Street, Newcastle, designed by LG Ekins
- 1932
  - The Stoll Picture Theatre became the first cinema in Newcastle upon Tyne to show a Talkie
  - Newcastle Co-Operative Society built a department store on Newgate Street, Newcastle
  - C&A Modes and Marks & Spencer purchased premises of Northumberland Street, Newcastle
  - Newcastle Electric Supply Company (NESCo) renamed North Eastern Electric Supply Company as it expanded to take over the entire regional supply
- 1933
  - British Union of Fascists opened two clubs in Newcastle, one with the stated objective of 'the promotion of fascism in Benwell'. Both clubs closed after two years
  - A new Police Headquarters was opened at the corner of Market Street and Pilgrim Street
- 1934
  - J. B. Priestley, in his 'English Journey' described Newcastle as 'so ugly it made the West Riding towns look like inland resorts', although he conceded it had a 'certain sombre dignity'
- 1935
  - By this year 11,000 houses had been built in Newcastle under RG Roberts, City Housing Architect
- 1936
  - RG Roberts appointed as Newcastle's first City Architect
  - Newcastle General Hospital treated 6,695 patients
  - John Grantham was Mayor of Newcastle
- 1937
  - 28 June: 15 Basque boys arrived in Newcastle, refugees from the Spanish Civil War
  - Bert Helmsley won the Morpeth To Newcastle Road Race
  - The School of Medicine and Armstrong College merged to become King's College
- 1938
  - Infant mortality in Newcastle had reduced to 66 per 1,000, but was still above the national average
  - Whooping cough killed only 3 in Newcastle, a major reduction since 1920

=== 1940s ===
- 1941
  - 25 April: German bombing raid resulted in heavy casualties and damage in Heaton, Newcastle upon Tyne
- 1943
  - Jackie Milburn was signed by Newcastle United F.C.
- 1945
  - Vickers-Armstrongs plants at Elswick and Scotswood together were the largest employers in Newcastle
- 1947
  - At coal nationalisation vesting day, the Montagu pit was the only operative pit in Newcastle
  - There were 477 convictions for drunkenness in Newcastle
- 1948
  - Bert Helmsley won the Morpeth To Newcastle Road Race for the second time
  - Newcastle United F.C. were promoted to the First Division after the 1947–48 Football League season during which they broke the Football League attendance records with average home crowds of over 56, 283
  - An office complex for pensions and benefits was established in Longbenton

=== 1950s ===
- 1950
  - Imperial Group opened their Wills cigarette factory
- 1951
  - 28 April: In the 1951 FA Cup final, Newcastle United defeated Blackpool 2–0 at Wembley, with both goals scored by Jackie Milburn
  - Turnover for shops in Newcastle central area was £56m
  - Bert Helmsley won the Morpeth To Newcastle Road Race for the third time, aged 42
- 1952
  - 3 May: In the 1952 FA Cup final, Newcastle United defeated Arsenal 1–0 at Wembley, with the only goal scored by George Robledo
- 1953
  - Jim Peters won the Morpeth To Newcastle Road Race, beating the record time by four minutes
  - Newcastle clinics reported 2,587 new cases of venereal disease
  - Newcastle's first slum clearance plan scheduled 4,500 houses for demolition
- 1954
  - Newcastle recorded its highest level of house building to date at 1,824 for the year
- 1955
  - 7 May: In the 1955 FA Cup final, Newcastle United defeated Manchester City 3–1 at Wembley, with goals scored by Jackie Milburn, Bobby Mitchell and George Hannah
- 1956
  - Hunting & Sons Ltd established a travel agency in Newcastle
  - Montagu pit, the only operative pit in Newcastle, was closed, ending 209 years of mining
  - Rowntree Mackintosh established a factory in Newcastle
- 1957
  - Jackie Milburn retired having scored 238 goals in a record 492 appearances for Newcastle United F.C.
- 1958
  - The Labour Party regained control of Newcastle City Council

=== 1960s ===
- 1961
  - All Saint's Church deconsecrated and converted to office space
- 1962
  - 9 June: Hugh Gaitskell, Leader of the Labour Party, opened 'The Willows' tower block at Cruddas Park, Newcastle
  - Newcastle Brown Ale introduced in cans
- 1963
  - A review scheduled 5,820 houses for slum clearance and a further 3,500 to be demolished for city centre improvement
  - King's College became Newcastle University, independent of Durham University
- 1965
  - Newcastle City Council launched a plan to redevelop Eldon Square and the construction of a large indoor shopping complex, Eldon Square Shopping Centre
  - Newcastle Stock Exchange was amalgamated with other exchanges in the north of England to form the Northern Stock Exchange
- 1966
  - Northern Rock moved to the Regent Centre in Gosforth, Newcastle
- 1968
  - 14 November: Newcastle Civic Centre opened by King Olav V of Norway, designed by Newcastle city architect George Kenyon
  - Vickers-Armstrongs sold off their naval yard at Walker, Newcastle upon Tyne
  - The old public library in New Bridge Street was demolished to make way for John Dobson Street
- 1969
  - Construction of Eldon Square Shopping Centre began
  - Newcastle United F.C. won the 1969 Inter-Cities Fairs Cup final
  - Newcastle Polytechnic was established
  - Newgate Shopping Centre was built in Grainger Street, Newcastle

=== 1970s ===
- 1971
  - Turnover for shops in Newcastle central area was £121m
- 1974
  - The Stoll Picture Theatre closed
  - In the 1974 FA Cup final Newcastle United F.C. lost 3-0 to Liverpool F.C.
- 1976
  - Eldon Square Shopping Centre was opened
  - Work began on construction of the Queen Elizabeth II Metro Bridge
  - In the 1976 Football League Cup final Newcastle United F.C. lost 2-1 to Manchester City F.C.
- 1977
  - Queen Elizabeth II visited Newcastle
- 1978
  - 1 August: The two sections of the Queen Elizabeth II Metro Bridge were joined in the centre
- 1979
  - The unemployment rate in Newcastle was 8%
- 1979-81
  - 19% of factory jobs were lost in Newcastle

=== 1980s ===
- 1980
  - Jackie Milburn was made a Freeman of the City of Newcastle upon Tyne, along with Basil Hume
- 1981
  - 6 November: Queen Elizabeth II Metro Bridge officially opened by Queen Elizabeth II
  - 15 November: Queen Elizabeth II Metro Bridge and new section of Metro line from Haymarket, Newcastle upon Tyne to Heworth opened to the public
  - Newcastle City Council began a rolling programme for regeneration of the Quayside
- 1982
  - The unemployment rate in Newcastle was 18%
- 1983
  - New Redheugh Bridge between Gateshead and Newcastle was opened by Diana, Princess of Wales
- 1988
  - Fleming Memorial Hospital was closed with services transferring to the Royal Victoria Infirmary

=== 1990s ===
- 1991
  - At the Census the population of Newcastle was 280,000
  - Riots took place in Elswick
- 1992
  - Newcastle Polytechnic became Northumbria University
- 1995
  - Newcastle Arena was opened with an 11,000 seat capacity
- 1996
  - The existing frontage of Fenwick (department store) was restored
- 1997
  - C. A. Parsons and Company Heaton works taken over by Siemens
- 1998
  - May: In the 1998 FA Cup final Newcastle United F.C. lost 2-0 to Arsenal F.C.
  - Turnover for Fenwicks department store was £250m
  - Northumberland Street and the upper parts of Grainger Street, Blackett Street and Grey Street were pedestrianised
- 1999
  - In the 1999 FA Cup final Newcastle United F.C. lost 2-0 to Manchester United F.C.

== 21st Century ==
=== 2000s ===
- 2001
  - Excavations at High Bridge uncovered possible Bronze Age remains, the first evidence of occupation of the town before the Romans
  - Gateshead Millennium Bridge was opened
- 2002
  - Newcastle University won The Sunday Times University of the Year
  - Gateshead Millennium Bridge won the Royal Institute of British Architects Stirling Prize
- 2003
  - Bandstand rebuilt in Leazes Park based on the historical designs
- 2005
  - John Maine created a public artwork, Tributary, in the Side, reflecting the movement of the covered Lort Burn
- 2009
  - Flooding caused extensive damage to All Saints' Church
  - Newcastle NE1 was founded as an independent limited company to promote and champion Newcastle city centre

=== 2010s ===
- 2010
  - February: St Andrews Way opened in Newcastle
- 2011
  - 24 May: Geordie Shore, reality television show first airs on MTV UK
  - Theatre Royal, Newcastle underwent major restoration to restore Frank Matcham's designs
- 2015
  - All Saints' Church put on the English Heritage Heritage at Risk Register. Since then extensively restored
- 2019-2021
  - David Cook was Lord Mayor of Newcastle upon Tyne

=== 2020s ===
- 2025
  - 16 March: In the 2025 EFL Cup final, Newcastle United defeated Liverpool 2–1 at Wembley, with goals scored by Dan Burn and Alexander Isak

== See also ==
- History of Newcastle upon Tyne
- Timeline of Shipbuilding on the River Tyne
- Timeline of Northumbria and Northumberland
- Timeline of Tyne and Wear
- Timeline of Gateshead

== Sources ==
- Alexander, John (2000). A Century of Newcastle. Stroud: Sutton Publishing Ltd. ISBN 0-7509-2657-0.
- Allsopp, Bruce; Clark, Ursula (1969). Historic Architecture of Northumberland. Newcastle upon Tyne: Oriel Press. ISBN 0-85362-062-8.
- Atkinson, Frank (1979). The Great Northern Coalfield 1700-1900. Newcastle upon Tyne: Frank Graham. ISBN 0 85983 121 3.
- Barbey, MF (1981). Civil Engineering Heritage. Northern England. London: Telford Ltd. ISBN 0-7277-0098-7.
- Bruce, John Collingwood (1904). Lectures on Old Newcastle. Newcastle upon Tyne: Andrew Reid & Co Ltd.
- Charleton, Robert John (1899). A History of Newcastle upon Tyne from the earliest records to its formation as a city. London: Walter Scott Ltd.
- Christie, Rev James (1904). Northumberland: Its History, Its Features, and Its People (2nd ed.). Carlisle: Chas. Thurnam & Sons.
- Colls, Robert; Lancaster, Bill (2001). Newcastle upon Tyne. A Modern History. Chichester: Phillimore & Co Ltd. ISBN 1-86077-167-X.
- Donaghy, Peter; Laidler, John (2012). Discovering NewcastleGateshead. Ammanford: Sigma Leisure. ISBN 978-1-85058-913-6.
- Flowers, Anna; Histon, Vanessa (1999). Water Under the Bridges, Newcastle's Twentieth Century. Newcastle upon Tyne: Tyne Bridge Publishing. ISBN 1-85795-140-9.
- Fraser, CM; Emsley, K (1973). Tyneside. Newton Abbot: David & Charles. ISBN 0-7153-5764-6.
- Graham, Frank (1978). Newcastle. Short History and Guide. Newcastle upon Tyne: Frank Graham. ISBN 0-85983-111-6.
- Grundy, John (2022). History of Northumberland. Newcastle upon Tyne: Tyne Bridge Publishing. ISBN 9781838280970.
- Hearnshaw, FJC (1971). Newcastle-Upon-Tyne. Wakefield: SR Publishers Ltd. ISBN 0-85409-683-3.
- Hepplewhite, Peter (2002). Images of England - Newcastle upon Tyne. Stroud: Tempus Publishing Ltd. ISBN 0-7524-1598-0.
- Manders, Frank; Potts, Richard (2004). Crossing the Tyne. Nwcastle upon Tyne: Tyne Bridge Publishing. ISBN 1857951212.
- Middlebrook, Sydney (1968). Newcastle upon Tyne. Its Growth and Achievement. Wakefield: S.R. Publishers ltd.
- Newton, Diana; Pollard, AJ (2009). Newcastle and Gateshead before 1700. Chichester: Phillimore & Co Ltd. ISBN 978-1-86077-579-6.
- Rendel, G. Daphne (1898). Newcastle-on -Tyne. Its Municipal Origin and Growth. London: Edward Arnold.
- Sadler, John; Serdiville, Rosie (2019). The Little Book of Newcastle. Stroud, Gloucestershire: The History Press. ISBN 978-0-7509-9003-5.
- Smailes, AE (1960). North England. Edinburgh: Thomas Nelson & Sons Ltd.
- Taylor, David (2022). 111 Places in Newcastle That You Shouldn't Miss (2nd ed.). Germany: Emons Verlag GmbH. ISBN 978-3-7408-1043-6.
- Tomlinson, William Weaver (1920). Comprehensive Guide to the County of Northumberland (10th ed.). London: The Walter Scott Publishing Co Ltd.
- Trinder, Barrie (2015). Britain's Industrial Revolution: The Making of a Manufacturing People, 1700-1870. Lancaster: Carnegie Publishing Ltd. ISBN 978-1-85936-219-8.
- Walker, Robert Fulton (1976). The Origins of Newcastle upon Tyne. Newcastle upon Tyne: Thorne's Students' Bookshop Ltd.
- Webb, Jonathan CK (2009). Tyneside from the Air. Derby: Breedon Books Publishing Co Ltd. ISBN 9781-85983-683-5.
- Woodhouse, Robert (1992). Gateshead. A Pictorial History. Chichester: Phillimore & Co Ltd. ISBN 0 85033 825 5.
