= Thomas Sopwith (geologist) =

English mining engineer

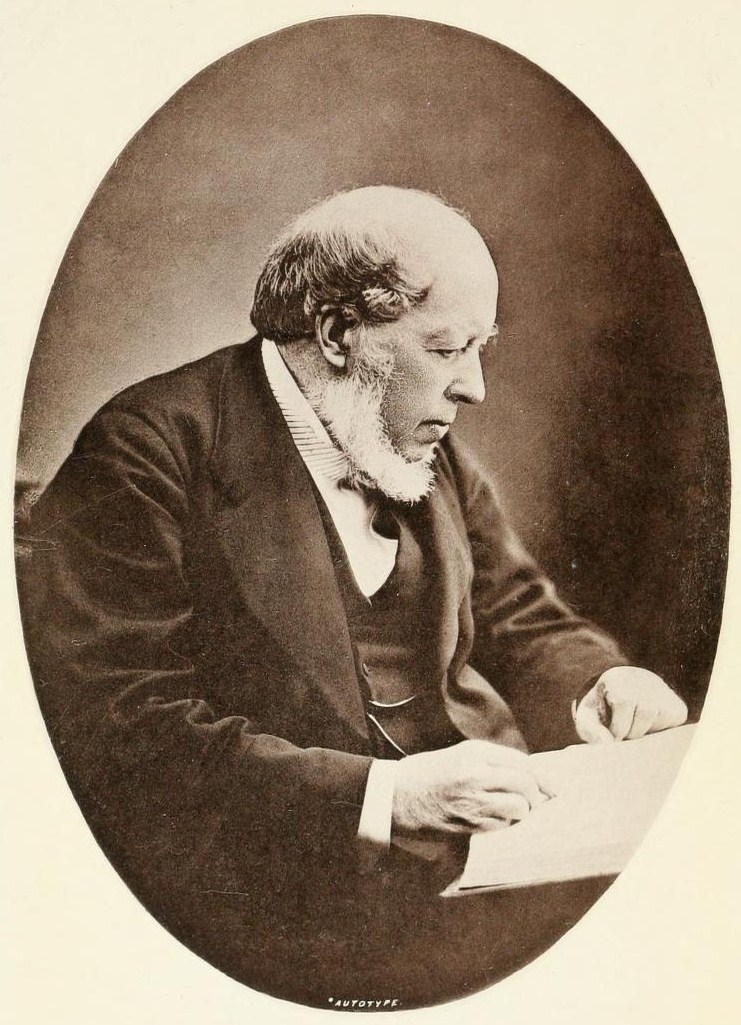
Thomas Sopwith.

Thomas Sopwith FRS (3 January 1803 – 16 January 1879) was an English mining engineer, teacher of geology and local historian.

== Early life ==
The son of Jacob Sopwith (1770–1829), by his wife Isabella, daughter of Matthew Lowes, Thomas was born at Newcastle upon Tyne in northern England. His father was a builder and cabinet-maker; Sopwith maintained links with the family furniture and joinery business throughout his life. Initially an illustrator of antiquities, he then took up land and mineral surveying, and subsequently described himself as a civil engineer. He invented, and the family firm manufactured, an ingenious type of desk with all its drawers secured by a single lock, the 'monocleid', which won a prize at the 1851 Exhibition; an improved levelling stave; and wooden geological teaching models.

== Career ==
=== Mining engineer ===
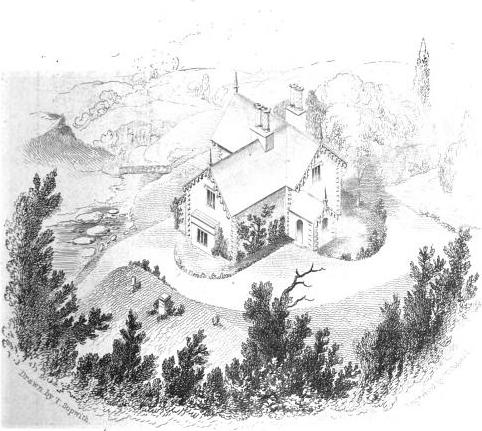
Title page illustration, Chesterholme from Sopwith's 1838 book on isometric drawing

In 1824 Sopwith completed an apprenticeship with his father, and took employment as a surveyor. He worked closely with Richard Grainger in the redevelopment of Newcastle Upon Tyne. He worked with Joseph Dickinson of Alston, Cumbria, on a survey of the lead mines in the area owned by Greenwich Hospital. He later built up contacts in London, especially in the area of geology, where he became a fellow of the Geological Society (and its more exclusive Geological Club) in 1835, sponsored by John Phillips.

Sopwith advocated the collection of mine surveys; he was associated in a Northumbrian survey with William Smith, and he was instrumental, after the meeting of the British Association in 1838, in inducing the government to found the Mining Record Office. In the same year he made a mining survey in County Clare in Ireland.

From 1845, Sopwith was based in Allenheads, Northumberland, where he was agent for W.B. Lead Mines (the Blackett-Beaumont Company). He kept the position until his retirement in 1871. In this role, he advocated for social and educational reform, particularly in the mining communities of Northumberland and Durham. During his tenure at Allenheads, he introduced a number of measures to improve the welfare of workers and their families, including the construction of new housing with a focus on health and family comfort, and he established schools that offered freehand and technical drawing, composition, and geography, among other subjects. On his retirement in 1871, Sopwith received a testimonial from 1,621 workers, acknowledging his contributions to improving their lives.

=== Railway engineer ===
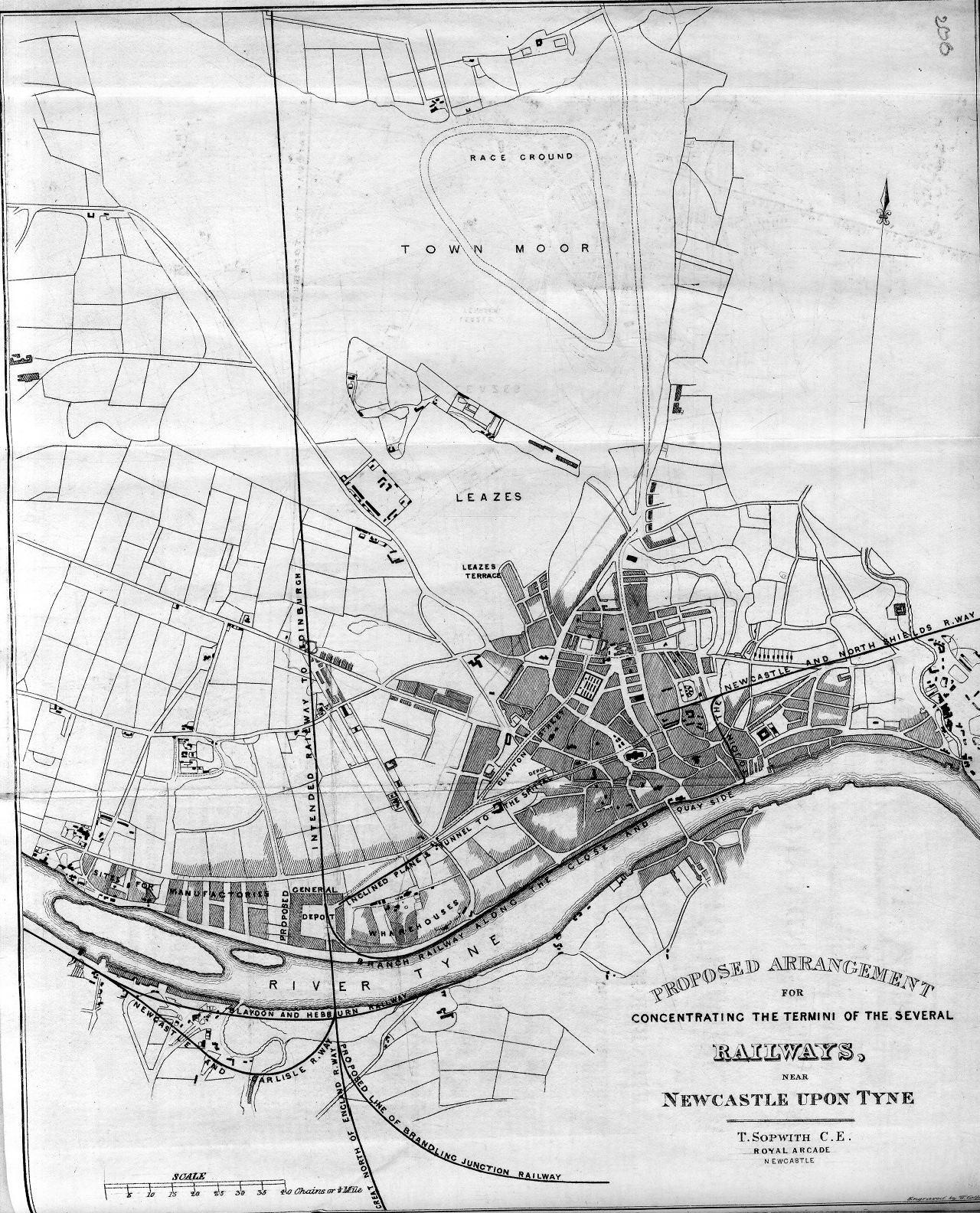
Richard Grainger's 1836 plan of Newcastle created for his proposal for a central Newcastle railway station by Thomas Sopwith

Sopwith became a railway surveyor, working on commissions. This included being commissioned to work on a central Newcastle station project with Richard Grainger (see plan right). He became involved with George Stephenson and Sir William Cubitt creating the French railway network.

In 1843 he was employed on the development of railways in Belgium. For the Sambre-Meuse line he did preliminary surveys, and then accompanied George Stephenson, by then retired, on an inspection visit. The result was that the Belgian de Grandvoir constructed the line, supervised by Robert Stephenson. Sopwith had called attention to the scientific importance of recording the geological features exposed in the cuttings of railways; and the British Association, at his initiative, made a grant in 1840 for the purpose.

=== Teaching models ===
Sopwith was an early user of 3-dimensional models both for practical illustration of regional geology (Forest of Dean; Ebbw Vale; Nentsberry) and for teaching, for which he produced sets (as recommended by Charles Lyell in his 1841 Elements of Geology). He also took advice from William Buckland about what structures would be useful. Different coloured woods represented the different types of rock. By assembling layers according to geological sections, Sopwith was able to demonstrate the stratification and disturbances in regions such as the carboniferous limestone and coal measures of northern England.

His models had wide-ranging applications. In mining, they were used to visualise the layout of mineral veins and assess the feasibility of extraction operations, thereby minimising risk and improving efficiency. For civil engineers, these models provided critical insights into the geological conditions that could affect construction projects, from railway cuttings to tunnel excavations. Sopwith’s advocacy for recording mining operations through detailed models laid the groundwork for systematic planning and documentation in the field.

== Personal life ==
Sopwith married three times: first, Mary Dickenson in 1828, who died in 1829; secondly, Jane Scott in 1831, who died in 1855; and thirdly, Anne Potter in 1858.

Among his eight children were:

- Jacob Sopwith, who died at the age of 19 after travelling to India with the Army under a false name.
- Ursula Sopwith, who married David Chadwick, M.P. on 11 June 1878
- Thomas Sopwith, a civil engineer and manager of a lead mining company in Linares in Spain. His children included:
  - Olive Sopwith, who married South African mining magnate Jack Barnato Joel in 1907.
  - Thomas Sopwith, founder of the Sopwith Aviation Company.
- Anna Sopwith, who married Sir William Shelford, K.C.M.G.
- Arthur Sopwith, who married William Shelford's sister Catherine and had four children, including clergyman Karl Sopwith.

Sopwith died in London and was buried at West Norwood Cemetery where there is a "Sopwith Path".

=== Awards and honours ===
Sopwith was elected a member or a fellow of many learned societies, including the Royal Society, the Athenaeum Club, the Geological Societies of England and France, the Institution of Civil Engineers, the Royal Institution, the Royal Geographical Society, the British Association for the Advancement of Science, the Society of Arts, the Royal Meteorological Society, the Statistical Society of London and the Archaeological Institute and Archaeological Association.

He was awarded the Telford Silver Medal by the Institute of Civil Engineers in 1842 and elected the fifth President of the Royal Meteorological Society in 1859.

He was elected a Fellow of the Royal Society in 1845. His candidature citation read: Thomas Sopwith Esq FGS London, Memb Inst CE and Member of the Geological Society of France, Civil Engineer [of] St Marys Terrace Newcastle on Tyne. The Author of a Treatise on Isometric Drawing. The Inventor or improver of Methods of representing Mineral structure by dissected Models.

== Works ==
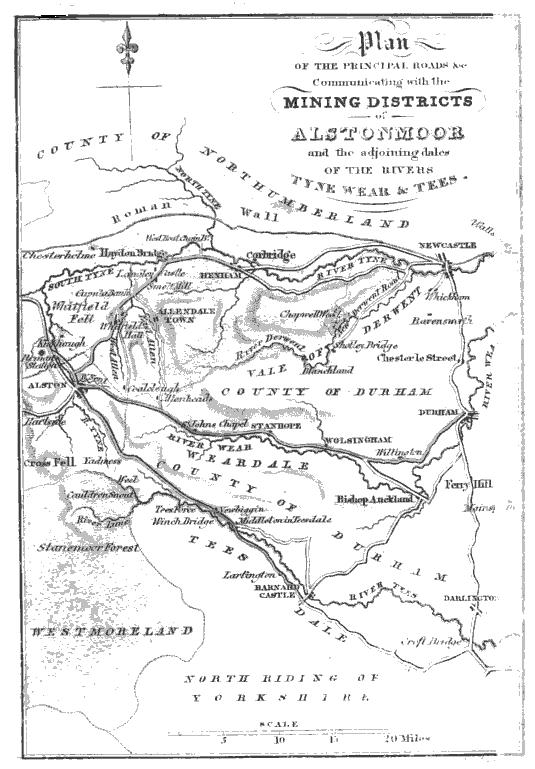
Map from Sopwith's An account of the mining districts of Alston Moor, Weardale and Teesdale in Cumberland and Durham (1833)

In 1826 Sopwith published A Historical and Descriptive Account of All Saints' Church in Newcastle-upon-Tyne (Newcastle). He later wrote a book on the Alston mining area, and two editions (1834, 1838) of a treatise on the use of the isometric projection for drawing surveys. He also made the case for mining records in book form.

=== Diaries ===
Sopwith wrote detailed diaries spanning the 57 years 1821–1878, recording daily events in his professional and personal life. He travelled widely, first by coach, then on the railways, and kept records of the times, prices, and conditions of travel in his diaries. His diaries also provide accounts of his meeting with people who were, or became, significant such as Charles Babbage, Charles Darwin and John Ruskin. The diaries are now held in the Special Collections at Newcastle University Library. Contemporaries also considered that Sopwith had substantial artistic ability, including as a cartoonist, although few of his drawings now survive.

=== Other works ===
- Eight Views of Fountains Abbey … with Description, Newcastle, 1832.
- Description of Monocleid Writing Cabinets, Newcastle, 1841?.
- An Account of the Museum of Economic Geology, London, 1843.
- Education: its Present State and Future Advancement, Newcastle, 1853.
- Notes of a Visit to Egypt, London, 1857.
- Notes of a Visit to France and Spain, Hexham, 1865.
- Education in Village Schools, London, 1868.
- Three Weeks in Central Europe, London, 1869.
