= Leazes Park =

Park in Newcastle, England

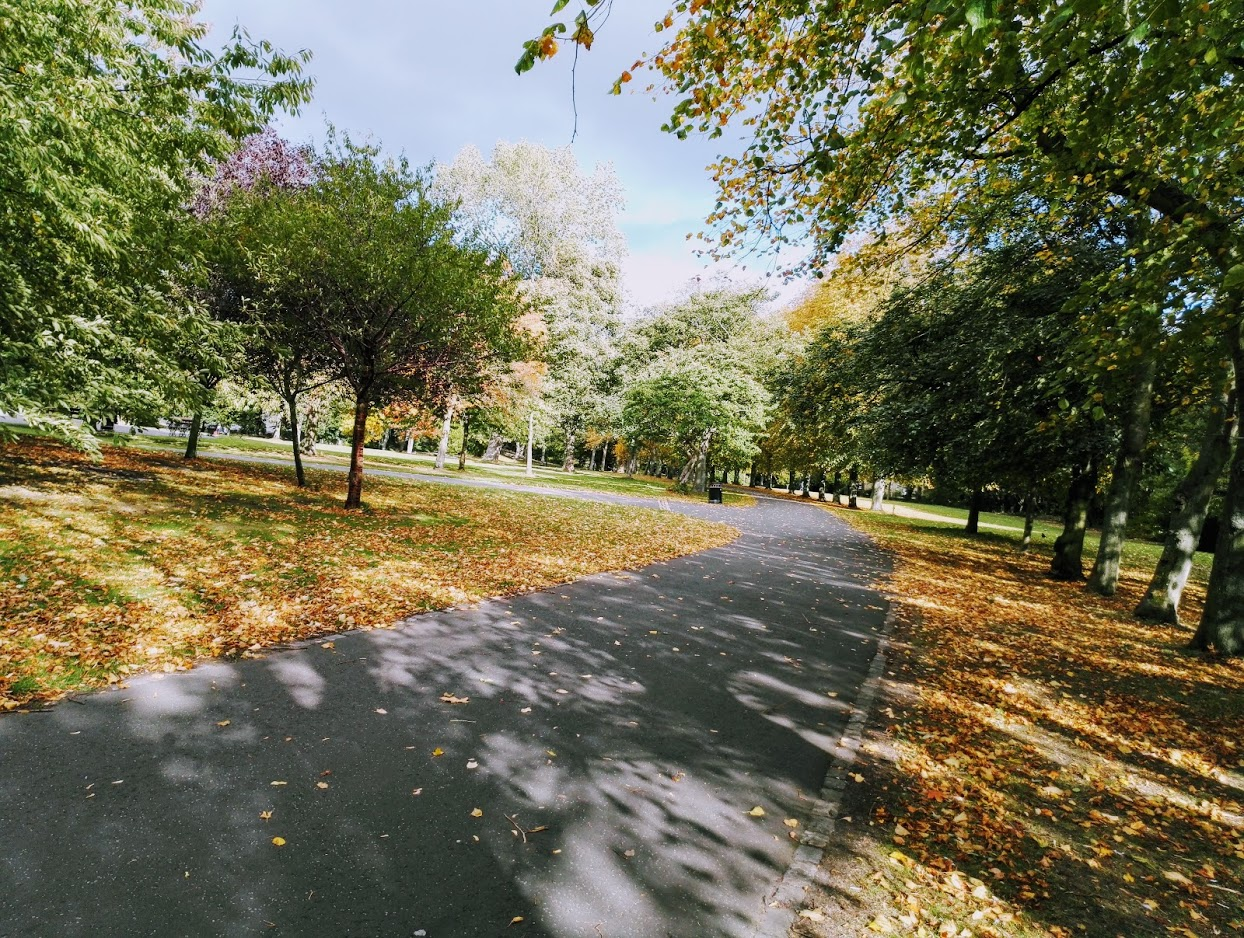
- Interactive map of Leazes Park
- Type: Urban park
- Location: Newcastle upon Tyne, England
- OS grid: NZ242648
- Coordinates: 54.977°N 1.623°W
- Area: 17.5 ha (43.21 acres)
- Opened: 23 December 1873
- Designer: John Fulton
- Owner: Newcastle City Council
- Manager: Urban Green Newcastle
- Water: Boating lake
- Designation: Grade II listed park
- Public transit: Haymarket Metro station; Haymarket bus station; Eldon Square bus station; Newcastle railway station
- Facilities: Café; Ice cream van; Picnic/BBQ area; Basketball court; Playground; Sensory garden; Tennis courts
- Website: urbangreennewcastle.org/find-your-park/leazes-park

Leazes Park is an urban park in Newcastle upon Tyne, England. Grade II listed, it is the city's oldest park, opened in 1873, and lies to the west of the city centre. The park contains a lake above the course of the Lort Burn. It is next to St James' Park and the Royal Victoria Infirmary.

Leazes Park is separated from Spital Tongues by Castle Leazes, an area of common land similar to the Town Moor.

== History ==
The creation of Leazes Park was a drawn out process. In September 1857 3,000 working men petitioned Newcastle Council for ‘ready access to some open ground for the purpose of health and recreation’ and a year later a special committee was set up to try to find a location for a park. Aldermen Harle and Hamond took up the challenge and campaigned for a park and eventually succeeded in having Leazes Park created on a part of the Leazes Town Moor.

On 23 December 1873, Leazes Park was officially opened by Alderman Sir Charles Hamond. It became the first public park created on Tyneside.

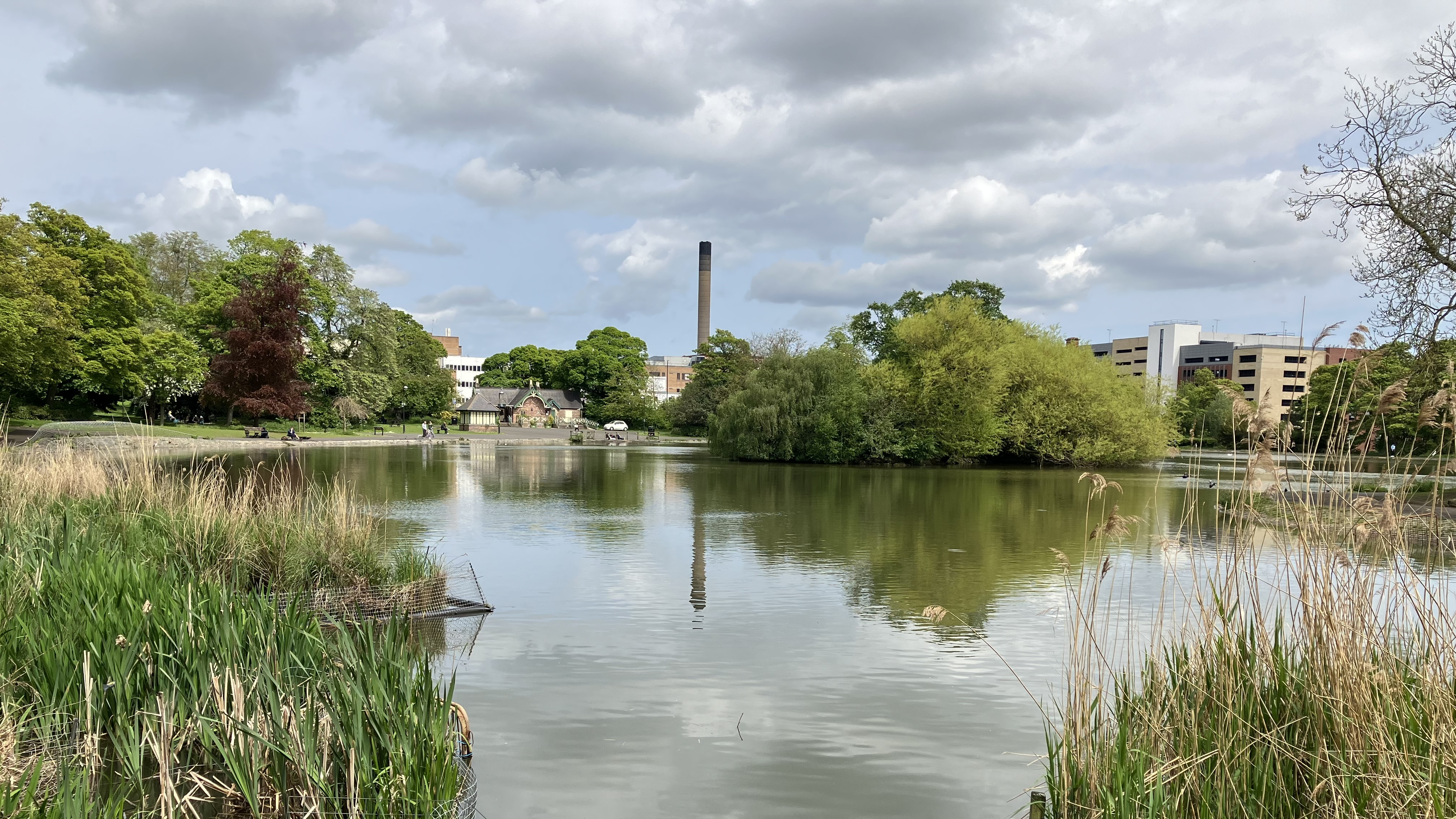
The boating lake

John Fulton, the Town Surveyor, laid out Leazes Park similar to other parks being built in Britain at that time. The layout centres on the lake. The Bandstand was added in 1875 and a balustrade stone terrace in 1879. Later, the whole park was surrounded with metal railings. A second lake was created in 1893 but this was filled in by 1949 and the area used for a bowling green and tennis courts.

The grand Jubilee Gates were added in 1896 to commemorate the Diamond Jubilee of Queen Victoria and a Palm House was built. In 1908 a bust of Alderman Sir Charles Hamond was erected (which is also grade II listed) as the centrepiece to the terrace and the park was then complete.

The park continued to develop with deer, aviaries, tennis, and croquet until the 1980s when it was in need of refurbishment. The refurbishment became possible when the park was awarded £3.7 million from the Heritage Lottery Fund in 2001. The restoration project was completed in 2004.
