= Spital Tongues =

District of Newcastle upon Tyne, England

Coordinates: 54°59′06″N 1°37′46″W

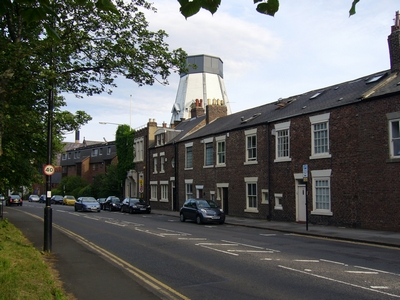
- Chimney Mill, 2006

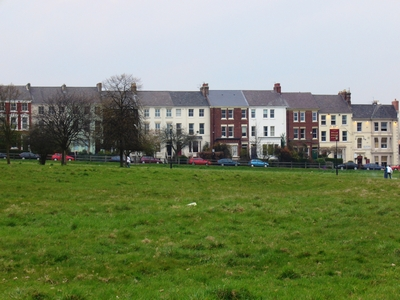
- Belle Grove Terrace, 2006
- Metropolitan borough: Newcastle upon Tyne
- Metropolitan county: Tyne and Wear
- Region: North East
- Country: England
- Sovereign state: United Kingdom
- Post town: NEWCASTLE UPON TYNE
- Postcode district: NE2
- Dialling code: 0191
- Police: Northumbria
- Fire: Tyne and Wear
- Ambulance: North East
- UK Parliament: Newcastle upon Tyne Central

Spital Tongues is a district of Newcastle upon Tyne, located due north-west of the Newcastle City Centre. Its unusual name is believed to be derived from spital – a corruption of the word hospital, commonly found in British place names (e.g. Spitalfields) - and tongues, meaning outlying pieces of land. North of Spital Tongues is the Town Moor, while Castle Leazes and Leazes Park are to the East.

== Buildings and structures of note ==
=== Fenham Barracks ===
Fenham Barracks was constructed in Spital Tongues in 1806. Several buildings at the site are listed grade II structures. The barracks has been repurposed as student accommodation. The barracks were home to the Northumberland Fusiliers during the Second World War. The Queen's Own Yeomanry currently has a presence on the site.

=== BBC Broadcasting Centre ===
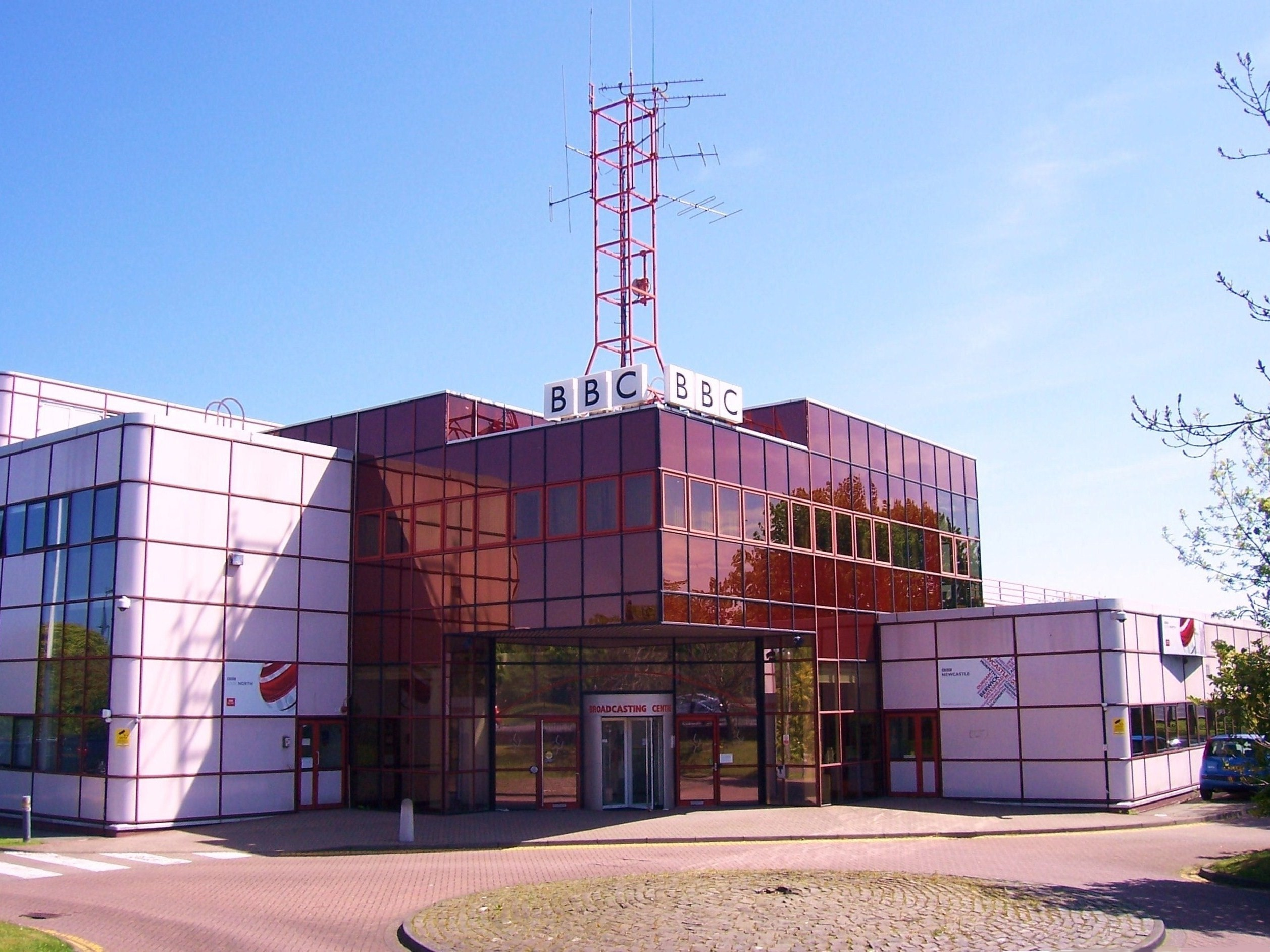
BBC Broadcasting Centre

Occupying the prominent site on the corner of Hunters Road and Barrack Road, is the BBC Broadcasting Centre, affectionately known as the 'Pink Palace'. Opened in 1986, it brought together the BBC's TV and radio operations in Newcastle from a range of locations. Today it is the headquarters of BBC North East and Cumbria, from where the regional news programme Look North (North East and Cumbria) and BBC Radio Newcastle are broadcast.

=== Huntsmoor House ===
Huntsmoor House, Hunters Road, was built as a soldiers' home in 1899 to meet the social needs of those soldiers stationed at Fenham Barracks. During the fifties large steam presses were installed for finishing tailored garments. Many of the operators of the presses were adults with learning difficulties. They congregated in the centre of Newcastle each morning and were then walked to Huntsmoor House to begin their work. Occasionally, one of the workers would lean out of a window to call over children playing in the backlane between Hunter's Road and Ancrum Street to send them on an errand for sweets to Jenny Proctors sweet shop. A small twist of Victory V lozenges was a favourite purchase and the child running the errand would be rewarded with half a lozenge on their return. Later, Huntsmoor House was used as a warehouse by the Newcastle bookseller Thornes before being turned into student accommodation. A three-storey red brick structure, the design of Huntsmoor House is unusual, topped with a crenellated tower featuring carved shields and a flagpole. The central section is flanked by two arched windows that rise through two storeys, with a Tudor style exposed beam gable above.

=== Chimney Mill ===
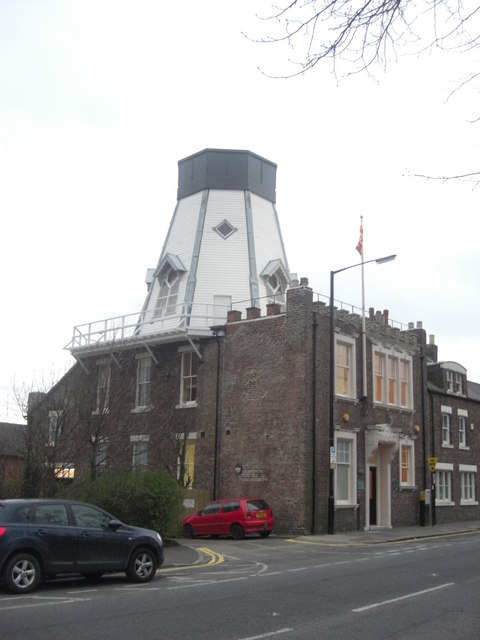
Chimney Mill, Spital Tongues

The Chimney Mill was constructed in 1782 in Claremont Road, replacing a previous windmill on the site. Grade II listed, it is significant on a number of levels – as the only surviving smock mill in the region; as the first 5-sailed smock mill in Britain; and for being designed by the civil engineer John Smeaton, the man responsible for the third Eddystone Lighthouse (later dismantled and rebuilt as Smeaton's Tower on Plymouth Hoe).

The Chimney Mill was powered by wind until 1891, decommissioned in 1892 and later converted into the clubhouse for Newcastle City Golf Club. The Club transferred to Gosforth in 1907, after which the windmill's sails and fantail were removed (in 1924 and 1933 respectively), with the windshaft and cap being dismantled and replaced by modern boarding in 1951.

In the mid-1970s the property was bought and restored by the architect Thomas Falconer. His conversion created a design studio on the top floor, an architect's studio on the first floor and space for rent on the ground floor. The building was used as offices for the fashion design company Nigel Cabourn Ltd from 1983 to 2007. It then became a dental practice and offices.

=== Victoria Tunnel ===
The Victoria Tunnel was built to transport coal from Spital Tongues Colliery, opened in 1836, to the river Tyne. 2 1/2 mi (4 km) long and up to 85 ft (26 m) deep, the tunnel was built by 200 men between 1839 and 1842, and came about as a result of the owners, Latimer and Porter, being refused permission to build a surface wagonway across the moor and city. Its Spital Tongues entrance was close to what is now the junction of Belle Grove West and Ancrum Street.

The tunnel ceased to be used in 1860, and remained unused for the next eighty years, except for a brief period from 1928 to 1929 when Thomas Moore, a Gateshead entrepreneur, attempted to farm mushrooms in the tunnel. It was reopened for use as an air raid shelter during World War II, with £37,000 spent on alterations and new entrances in order to provide seating capacity for 9,000 people. Though no longer used, some of these entrances remain very visible today, notably the entrance in Claremont Road next to the Hancock Museum. The northernmost (Spital Tongues) entrance was filled in when Belle Grove West was built in the 1870s and is therefore not accessible.

At the end of the war, most of the fittings were removed and all of the entrances except Ouse Street were closed. This entrance had been built on private land: the garden of number 14 Ouse Street. However, it was left open and it is now possible for visitors to visit the tunnel with guided tours.

=== Whiteknights ===
The house now called Whiteknights was originally known as New House prior to being opened as a lunatic asylum in 1766. At this time the property was renamed St. Luke's, before changing its name to Belle Grove Retreat in 1795. The property went on to give its name to the various other streets and buildings built in Spital Tongues from the 1850s, such as Belle Grove Terrace, Belle Grove Villas, Belle Grove West and the Belle Grove public house. The Belle Grove Retreat reverted to use as a private house in 1857, and assumed its current name in 1900. It is Grade II listed.

=== Belle Grove public house ===
On the corner of Belle Grove Terrace and Ancrum Street, the Belle Grove was a public house dating from 1857 until its closure in 2008. The adjacent house at No. 19, now part of the pub, was once the home of the artist Ralph Hedley until his death in 1913, a connection marked by a commemorative plaque. It was incorporated into the pub in 1923.

=== Belle Grove Terrace ===
No. 13 Belle Grove Terrace was also once home to T. Dan Smith, the leader of Newcastle City Council from 1960 to 1965, and the man behind the intended reinvention of Newcastle as the 'Brasília of the North'. The 15-storey Mill House tower block in Spital Tongues is one of many such residential towers erected across Newcastle during Smith's leadership; he lived there in an upper-storey flat from the early 1980s until his death in 1993.

Actor Alun Armstrong was Smith's neighbour whilst studying Fine Art at Newcastle University.

=== George Arrowsmith's ===
Though of little architectural significance, the shop on the corner of Belle Grove West and Hunter's Road has historical interest as the site of George Arrowsmith's general store. Opened in 1903, the shop was owned by the Arrowsmiths – one of Spital Tongues' most well-known families - until 1940. George and his wife Margaret had fifteen children following their marriage in 1882, and members of the Arrowsmith family continue to live in Spital Tongues today.

The former Arrowsmith shop has remained in continual retail use, and is now one of only a handful of shops in the village. It represents a sharp decline from the Co-operative store and 27 other retailers that Spital Tongues boasted in the 1920s.

=== Benson Memorial Church ===
The Benson Memorial Church in Ancrum Street was opened as a Sunday school in 1867, recognising the role of John Benson in setting up the school in temporary premises in 1845. Today, the building continues to serve a community function as the home of the Apostolic Church.

=== Moorbank Botanic Garden ===
Moorbank Botanic Gardens is located on Hunters Moor, at the top of Claremont Road. The Gardens were opened in 1923 as a plant research station for Newcastle University. Although not open to the public every day, access is granted to booked groups and on Open Days linked to the National Gardens Scheme. The garden had also received funding from the Heritage Lottery Fund. In 2012, Newcastle University announced its intention to withdraw its support for the facility
