= Lort Burn =

Culverted stream in Tyne and Wear, England

The Lort Burn is a subterranean burn in Newcastle upon Tyne which starts in Leazes Park. It used to flow through the centre of the city, along the Side, into the Tyne but was essentially used as an open sewer, particularly unpleasant since the meat markets backed onto it. The name may derive from the Old Norse lortr, meaning filth or excrement.

In 1696 it was arched over and a paved roadway constructed as a major improvement in the residential part of Newcastle. In 1749 Dean Street was built following its course (hence the street name, from dene); as was its extension, Grey Street, in the 1830s.

In 1832 Richard Grainger purchased Anderson Place and estate in Newcastle for £50,000, razed it to the ground, then arched over the Lort Burn which ran past it and filled its valley in

In 2005, John Maine created a public artwork, Tributary, in the Side, reflecting the movement of the covered Lort Burn

== Sources ==
- Charleton, Robert John (1899). A History of Newcastle upon Tyne from the earliest records to its formation as a city. London: Walter Scott Ltd.
- Donaghy, Peter; Laidler, John (2012). Discovering NewcastleGateshead. Ammanford: Sigma Leisure. ISBN 978 1 85058 913 6.
- Hearnshaw, FJC (1971). Newcastle-Upon-Tyne. Wakefield: SR Publishers Ltd. ISBN 0-85409-683-3.
- Middlebrook, Sydney (1968). Newcastle upon Tyne. Its Growth and Achievement. Wakefield: S.R. Publishers ltd.
