= Richard Grainger =

British builder (1797–1861)

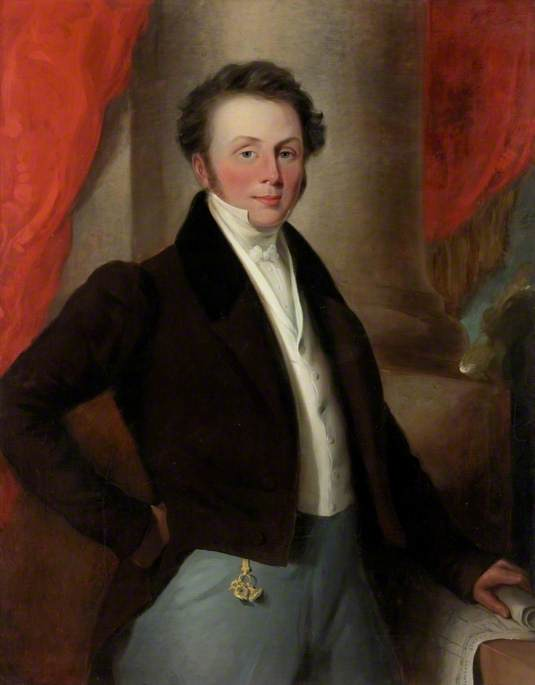
- Richard Grainger, 1827
- Born: 9 October 1797; High Friar's Lane, Newcastle upon Tyne, England
- Died: 4 July 1861 (aged 63); 5 Clayton Street West, Newcastle upon Tyne, England
- Resting place: St James Church, Benwell
- Education: St Andrews Charity School, High Friar Lane, Newcastle upon Tyne
- Spouse: Rachel Arundale (d.1842)
- Children: 13
- Parent(s): Thomas Grainger (d.c.1810) and Amelia Burt (1755–1835)
- Engineering career
- Projects: Grainger Town

Richard Grainger (9 October 1797 – 4 July 1861) was a builder in Newcastle upon Tyne. He worked with the architects John Dobson and Thomas Oliver, and with the town clerk, John Clayton, to redevelop the centre of Newcastle in the 19th century. Grainger Street and the Grainger Market are named after him; sometimes the whole area of Newcastle developed in the Neoclassical style around Grey Street and Grainger Street is referred to as Grainger Town.

== Early history ==
Grainger was born in High Friar's Lane, the son of Thomas Grainger, a Quayside porter, and Amelia Burt, a seamstress. He was educated at St Andrew's Charity School in Newgate Street and was apprenticed to a carpenter at the age of 12. In 1816, at the age of 20 he started in business as a builder in partnership with his brother George, a bricklayer. However George died and Richard carried on alone. His first important contract was in 1819, to build a group of houses in Higham Place for Alderman Batson, a prominent Newcastle Methodist. Through Batson's influence he came into contact with various leading men in the town and married into a well-to-do family. His wife, Rachel Arundale, the daughter of a wealthy leather merchant brought him a dowry of £5,000. The couple eventually had thirteen children – six sons and seven daughters.

== Early work ==
Between 1824 and 1826 he built the greater part of Eldon Square, designed by John Dobson and Blackett Street, designed by Thomas Oliver. In 1827 Grainger built St Mary's Place, designed by John Dobson, opposite the church of St Thomas the Martyr, which Dobson had recently completed. In 1829 Grainger began work on Leazes Terrace, Leazes Crescent and Leazes Place, all designed by Thomas Oliver and aimed at middle-class tenants. In 1832 he completed building the Royal Arcade at the foot of Pilgrim Street. This was an impressive, elegant building, intended as a commercial and shopping centre. Unfortunately, it did not succeed in this role due to its remoteness from the town centre. It was eventually demolished in the 1960s to make way for the Pilgrim Street roundabout.

== The creation of Grainger Town ==
Up until 1834, Grainger had been limited to building individual blocks of buildings, but had become a rich man, owning property worth £200,000. However, in 1831 George Anderson died. Anderson was the owner of Anderson Place, a house and grounds in the north end of the town, inside the town walls and on his death the land became available for development. Grainger's first step was to buy the Anderson Place from the executors of the estate for £50,000, as well as other additional property for £45,000, but he could not afford to finance the development himself. In 1834 Grainger presented a comprehensive development plan to the town council. Dobson had already submitted a similar plan to the council previously and been rejected, so Grainger needed someone with influence to encourage the council to accept the new plan. He was advised to move his legal account to the solicitor's firm run by John Clayton, the town clerk. Clayton became Grainger's advocate and adviser, and the council adopted his scheme within two months. There were objections to the scheme on the grounds that it would involve the demolition of the Theatre Royal in Mosley Street and the Flesh Market, which was less than thirty years old. Grainger countered these objections by offering to build a new Theatre Royal and a new meat and vegetable market.

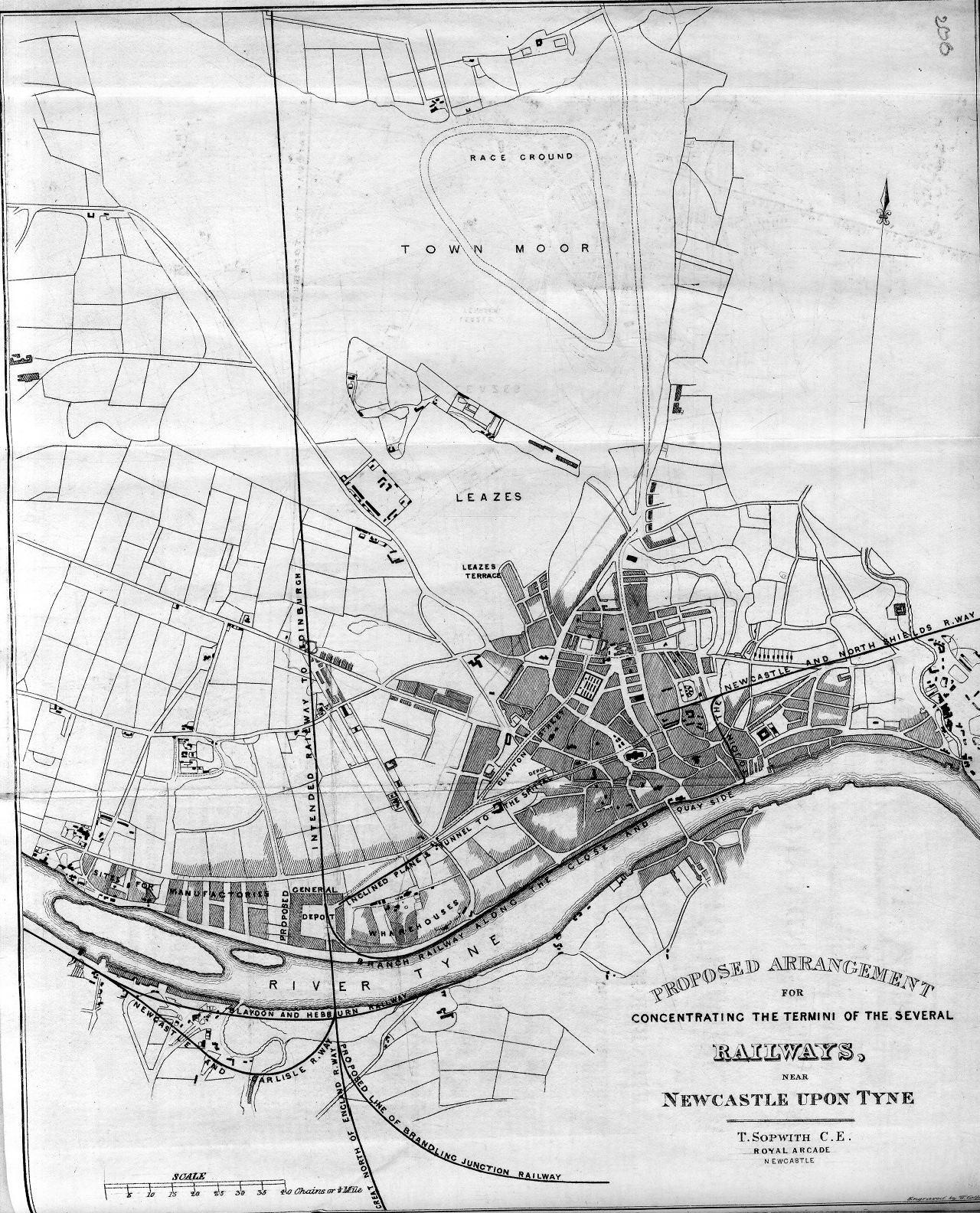
Grainger's 1836 plan of a proposal for a central Newcastle railway station by Thomas Sopwith.

The plan, covering a 12-acre (49,000 m^{2}) site, was for a commercial and shopping area based on three main thoroughfares, Grey Street, Grainger Street and Clayton Street, leading to the lower part of town. Cross connection between these streets was provided by Hood Street, Shakespeare Street, Market Street and Nelson Street. The triangle formed by Grey Street, Grainger Street and Market Street contained the Central Exchange, originally intended as a corn market but rejected by the council. The new meat market was placed between Grainger Street and Clayton Street with the new vegetable market on the north west side of Clayton Street.

Work began in 1834, with the filling in of the Lort Burn north of Dean Street in order to build Upper Dean Street (later named Grey Street). By late 1835, the new meat market, containing 180 butchers' shops, was finished, as well as the vegetable market on the other side of Clayton Street. The meat market was later named the 'Grainger Market'. The rest of the scheme was completed in 1839. It comprised nine streets, 10 inns, 12 public houses, 325 shops, with homes attached, and 40 private houses. The jewel of the scheme was Grey Street, which curves to the left as it sweeps downhill towards Dean Street. Part of the way down, the sweep is interrupted by the projecting portico of the Theatre Royal, built to replace the old Theatre Royal in Mosley Street and designed by John and Benjamin Green. At the top of Grey Street, Grainger placed the column of Grey's Monument as a focus for the whole scheme. Grainger had plans for a new Guildhall and Courts at the top of Grey Street, above the Theatre Royal, but these were rejected and he built a large bank there instead.

The whole scheme cost £646,000. The buildings were constructed of high quality materials and faced with stone. They were provided with water-closets and sewers, and Grainger had the streets lit with gas and the road surfaces macadamised.

John Dobson is given much of the credit for the detailed design, but other architects also made significant contributions, especially Thomas Oliver and John and Benjamin Green. In addition, much important work was done by two architects in Grainger's office, John Wardle and George Walker. John Dobson's nephew Gibson Kyle was Grainger's foreman when most of Grainger's and Dobson's major works were carried out.

== Subsequent career ==
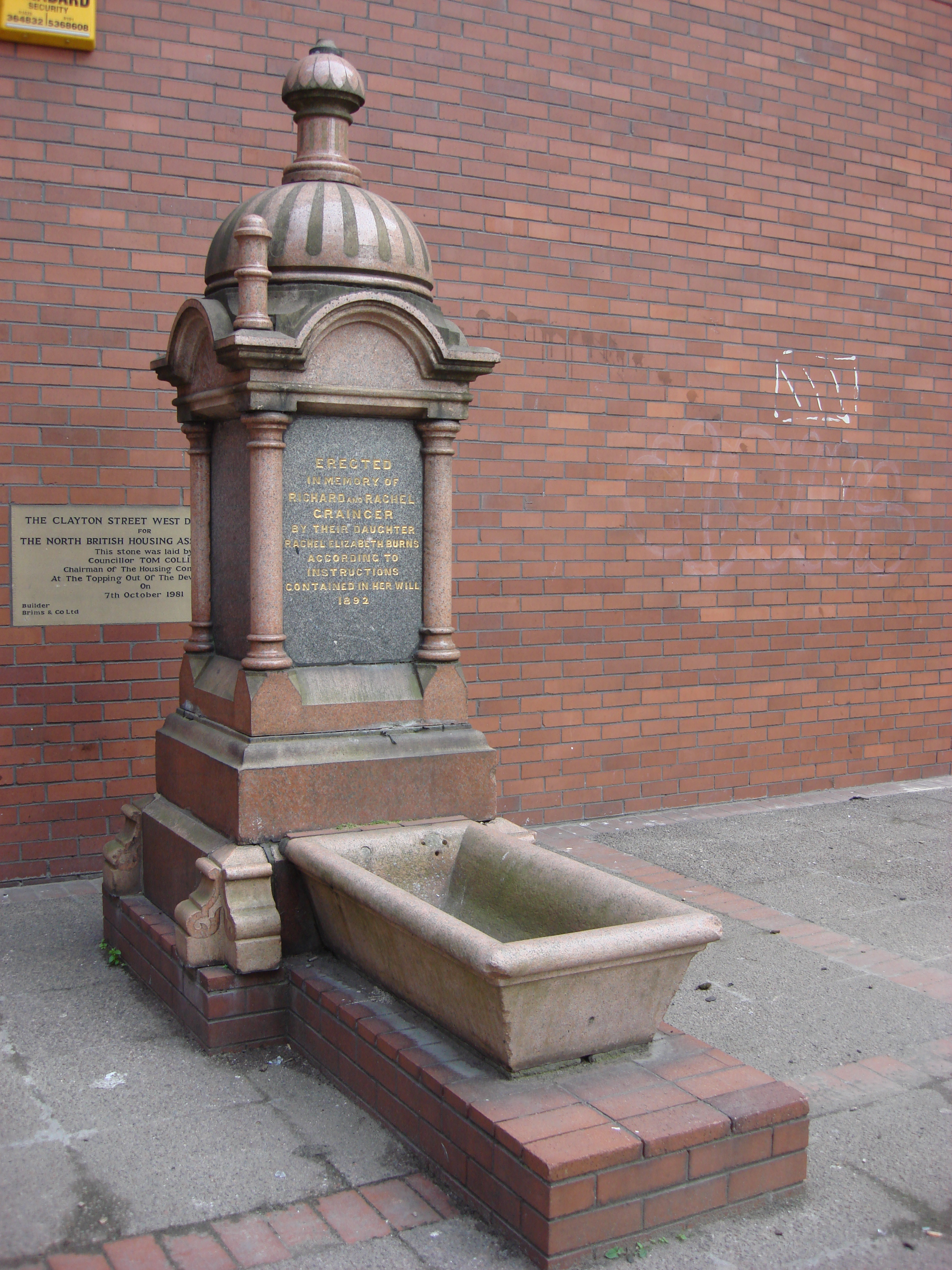
Memorial to Richard and Rachel Grainger in Newcastle.

With the completion of his major scheme for central Newcastle, Grainger looked around for another scheme to work on. In 1839 he paid £114,100 for the Elswick estate to the west of Newcastle intending to build a railway terminus there surrounded by factories and houses (see plan reproduced above). In this project he commissioned Thomas Sopwith (geologist). The project was stillborn and did not become the Newcastle Central station . The expense of buying the estate almost bankrupted Grainger and by 1841 his creditors were demanding payment. He was saved from bankruptcy by John Clayton, who persuaded Grainger's creditors to accept gradual repayment. Grainger was forced to live modestly. The riverside section of the Elswick estate was sold to William Armstrong, for a new armaments factory. Grainger built a number of streets of terraced houses, in Benwell and Elswick, for the workers at Armstrong's factory, and named several of them using the forenames of his thirteen children.

Grainger died in 1861 at his home at 5 Clayton Street West and is buried at St James Church, Benwell. At his death, his debts totalled £128,582 and his personal estate amounted to only £16,913. However, the sale of land in the Elswick estate helped to pay off these debts to such an extent that by 1901 the Grainger estate was worth over £1,200,000.

== Grainger's legacy ==
All three men, Grainger, Dobson and Clayton, deserve recognition for the creation of the centre of Newcastle in the Neoclassical style. Dobson provided much of the creative input to the scheme, whereas Grainger provided the essential drive to get the project completed. However, without Clayton's influence, the scheme would not have been accepted in the first place. It is ironic that Grainger's plan for a new commercial centre for Newcastle only lasted a short time as the building of the new railway terminal on Neville Street in 1849 drew trade away from Grey Street. The development of Northumberland Street as a new shopping centre further accelerated Grey Street's decline. Despite this, most of Richard Grainger's creation has lasted till this day. It is unfortunate that in the sixties, in the push for modernisation, most of Eldon Square and about a quarter of the original scheme were demolished to make way for modern buildings. However, much remains, including Grey Street, which was voted England's finest street in 2005 in a survey of BBC Radio 4 listeners.

== List of streets and buildings built by Grainger ==
- Higham Place, 1819–1820, partially demolished nos 6,7 & 8 remain
- Blackett Street, 1824, demolished
- Eldon Square, 1825–1831, partially demolished 1 terrace of 3 remains
- Leazes Crescent, 1829–1830, extant
- Royal Arcade, 1831–1832, demolished
- Leazes Terrace, 1829–1834, extant
- Grey Street, 1834–1839, extant
- Grainger Market, 1835, extant
- Grey's Monument, 1838, extant
- Graingerville South, 1839, extant
- Exchange Buildings, 1840, extant
