= Grade I listed buildings in Tyne and Wear =

Tyne and Wear shown within England

There are 75 Grade I listed buildings in Tyne and Wear, England.

In England and Wales the authority for listing is granted by the Planning (Listed Buildings and Conservation Areas) Act 1990 and is administered by English Heritage, an agency of the Department for Culture, Media and Sport. In Tyne and Wear, the councils of Gateshead, Newcastle upon Tyne, North Tyneside, South Tyneside and Sunderland each maintain a list of Grade I listed buildings.

In the United Kingdom the term listed building refers to a building or other structure officially designated as being of special architectural, historical or cultural significance. Grade I buildings are described as being "buildings of outstanding or national architectural or historic interest".

Several of the entries relate to more than one listed structure where these have been grouped together as part of the same geographical location or where ancillary structures (such as walls and gates in front of a building) are listed separately.

== Gateshead ==
Name	Location	Type	Completed (Note: The date given is the date used by Historic England as significant for the initial building or that of an important part in the structure's description.)	Date designated	Grid ref. (Note: The grid reference is based on the British national grid reference system, sometimes known as OSGB36, used by the Ordnance Survey.) Geo-coordinates	Entry number (Note: The "List Entry Number" is a unique number assigned to each listed building and scheduled monument by Historic England.)	Image
Banqueting House about 500 Metres East and 300 Metres South of Gibside	Gibside Estate, Gateshead	Banqueting House	1751	1 February 1950	NZ1816458634; 54°55′19″N 1°43′05″W	1355118	Banqueting House about 500 Metres East and 300 Metres South of Gibside More images
Monument to British Liberty	Gibside Estate, Gateshead	Column	1750–57	1 February 1950	NZ1794859132; 54°55′36″N 1°43′17″W	1025166	Monument to British Liberty More images
Chapel south-west of Gibside Hall	Gibside Estate, Gateshead	Chapel	Completed 1812	1 February 1950	NZ1718758250; 54°55′07″N 1°44′00″W	1185345	Chapel south-west of Gibside Hall More images
Chapel of St Edmund and Trinity Centre	Gateshead	Church	1837	26 April 1950	NZ2570563135; 54°57′44″N 1°36′00″W	1277874	Chapel of St Edmund and Trinity Centre More images
Church of Holy Cross	Ryton, Gateshead	Parish Church	13th century	21 January 1949	NZ1510064831; 54°58′40″N 1°45′56″W	1025160	Church of Holy Cross More images
Church of St Mary	Whickham, Gateshead	Sundial	1651	1 February 1950	NZ2097361358; 54°56′47″N 1°40′27″W	1185359	Church of St Mary More images
Church of St Mary	Gateshead	School	Early 19th century	26 April 1950	NZ2544563680; 54°58′02″N 1°36′15″W	1248544	Church of St Mary More images
High Level Bridge	River Tyne, Gateshead	Railway Bridge	1849	26 April 1950	NZ2518163634; 54°58′00″N 1°36′30″W	1248568	High Level Bridge More images
Old Hollinside	Gateshead	Fortified Manor House	13th century	1 February 1950	NZ1855759920; 54°56′01″N 1°42′43″W	1025137	Old Hollinside More images

== Newcastle upon Tyne ==
Name	Location	Type	Completed	Date designated	Grid ref. Geo-coordinates	Entry number	Image
Alderman Fenwick's House	Newcastle upon Tyne	House	c. 1987	14 June 1954	NZ2504364201; 54°58′18″N 1°36′37″W	1024793	Alderman Fenwick's House More images
Bessie Surtees House and Milbank House	Newcastle upon Tyne	House	17th century	14 June 1954	NZ2516863845; 54°58′07″N 1°36′30″W	1024779	Bessie Surtees House and Milbank House More images
Bishop's House	Newcastle upon Tyne	Bishops Palace	1942	14 June 1954	NZ1986765670; 54°59′07″N 1°41′28″W	1338212	Bishop's House More images
Blackfriars East Range	Newcastle upon Tyne	Workshop	1987	14 June 1954	NZ2446464196; 54°58′18″N 1°37′10″W	1086979	Blackfriars East Range More images
Blackfriars South Range	Newcastle upon Tyne	Bench	18th century	14 June 1954	NZ2444764182; 54°58′18″N 1°37′11″W	1087001	Blackfriars South Range More images
Blackfriars West Range	Newcastle upon Tyne	Workshop	1978–80	14 June 1954	NZ2442864200; 54°58′19″N 1°37′12″W	1355267	Blackfriars West Range More images
Cathedral of St Mary	Newcastle upon Tyne	Roman Catholic Cathedral	c. 1844	14 June 1954	NZ2447663908; 54°58′09″N 1°37′09″W	1024913	Cathedral of St Mary More images
Cathedral of St Nicholas	Newcastle upon Tyne	Cathedral	1882	14 June 1954	NZ2498964009; 54°58′12″N 1°36′40″W	1355309	Cathedral of St Nicholas More images
Central Railway Station; Passenger Buildings and Train Shed with Platforms	Newcastle upon Tyne	Booking Office	1845–50	14 June 1954	NZ2461363825; 54°58′06″N 1°37′01″W	1355291	Central Railway Station; Passenger Buildings and Train Shed with Platforms More images
Church of All Saints	Newcastle upon Tyne	Church	1954	14 June 1954	NZ2526064017; 54°58′12″N 1°36′25″W	1106329	Church of All Saints More images
Church of St Andrew	Newcastle upon Tyne	Parish Church	12th century	14 June 1954	NZ2454464396; 54°58′25″N 1°37′05″W	1104887	Church of St Andrew More images
Church of St Ann	Newcastle upon Tyne	Chapel of Ease	1764-8	14 June 1954	NZ2606164277; 54°58′21″N 1°35′40″W	1355222	Church of St Ann More images
Church of St George	Newcastle upon Tyne	Church	1888	14 June 1954	NZ2551466798; 54°59′42″N 1°36′10″W	1024784	Church of St George More images
Church of St John the Baptist	Newcastle upon Tyne	Parish Church	14th century	14 June 1954	NZ2470064011; 54°58′12″N 1°36′57″W	1024728	Church of St John the Baptist More images
Church of St Michael and All Angels	Newburn, Newcastle upon Tyne	Parish Church	11th century	21 October 1949	NZ1667965368; 54°58′57″N 1°44′27″W	1186036	Church of St Michael and All Angels More images
Corner Tower	Newcastle upon Tyne	Turret	Medieval	17 December 1971	NZ2530764148; 54°58′17″N 1°36′22″W	1024903	Corner Tower More images
Earl Grey Monument	Newcastle upon Tyne	Commemorative Monument	1838	14 June 1954	NZ2486164425; 54°58′26″N 1°36′47″W	1329931	Earl Grey Monument More images
East Front of Grainger Market	Newcastle upon Tyne	House	1835	14 June 1954	NZ2478664296; 54°58′22″N 1°36′52″W	1355243	East Front of Grainger Market More images
Grainger Market	Newcastle upon Tyne	Market Hall	1808	14 June 1954	NZ2474964311; 54°58′22″N 1°36′54″W	1024866	Grainger Market More images
Gunner Tower	Newcastle upon Tyne	Tower	late C13/early 14th century	30 March 1987	NZ2454163932; 54°58′10″N 1°37′05″W	1260201	Gunner Tower More images
Heron Pit Prison, Drawbridge Pit and other Under-buildings in Barbican	Newcastle upon Tyne	Privy House	Mid 13th century	14 June 1954	NZ2503463922; 54°58′09″N 1°36′38″W	1024937	Heron Pit Prison, Drawbridge Pit and other Under-buildings in Barbican More images
High Level Bridge	Newcastle upon Tyne	Bridge	1845-9	14 June 1950	NZ2513063702; 54°58′02″N 1°36′32″W	1355287	High Level Bridge More images
Moot Hall	Newcastle upon Tyne	Moot Hall	Late C19, after 1877	17 December 1971	NZ2511163866; 54°58′08″N 1°36′33″W	1116297	Moot Hall More images
Numbers 11 to 43 (west Front of Grainger Market)	Newcastle upon Tyne	House	1835	14 June 1954	NZ2471164329; 54°58′23″N 1°36′56″W	1320114	Numbers 11 to 43 (west Front of Grainger Market) More images
Numbers 1–59 including Lake House, Garnett House, Hodgkin House, Gurney House and Embleton House, (Leazes Terrace)	Newcastle upon Tyne	House	1954	14 June 1954	NZ2438364754; 54°58′36″N 1°37′14″W	1335857	Numbers 1–59 including Lake House, Garnett House, Hodgkin House, Gurney House and Embleton House, (Leazes Terrace) More images
Old Tyne Bridge	Newcastle upon Tyne	Bridge	Medieval	14 June 1954	NZ2516463790; 54°58′05″N 1°36′31″W	1323141	Upload Photo
Plummer Tower	Newcastle upon Tyne	House	Late 18th century	17 December 1971	NZ2520064416; 54°58′25″N 1°36′28″W	1024884	Plummer Tower More images
Roman Turret Opposite Number 800, Bishops House (Denton Hall) with Section of Hadrian's Wall	Newcastle upon Tyne	Wall	122	17 December 1971	NZ1985765549; 54°59′03″N 1°41′28″W	1355307	Roman Turret Opposite Number 800, Bishops House (Denton Hall) with Section of Hadrian's Wall More images
Sallyport or Wall Knoll Tower	Newcastle upon Tyne	Tower	14th century	17 December 1971	NZ2547464148; 54°58′17″N 1°36′13″W	1121526	Sallyport or Wall Knoll Tower More images
Salters' Bridge (Tyne and Wear Bridge Number 077)	Newcastle upon Tyne	Bridge	Medieval	30 March 1987	NZ2547968542; 55°00′39″N 1°36′11″W	1299417	Salters' Bridge (Tyne and Wear Bridge Number 077) More images
South Front of Grainger Market	Newcastle upon Tyne	Market Hall	1835	14 June 1954	NZ2472164263; 54°58′21″N 1°36′55″W	1355260	South Front of Grainger Market More images
South Postern Tower facing the River, and Curtain Wall adjoining	Newcastle upon Tyne	Curtain Wall	1168–78	14 June 1954	NZ2509863837; 54°58′07″N 1°36′34″W	1024939	South Postern Tower facing the River, and Curtain Wall adjoining
Temple of Antenociticus	Newcastle upon Tyne	Vicus	c180	17 December 1971	NZ2171164676; 54°58′34″N 1°39′44″W	1116382	Temple of Antenociticus More images
The Barbican Walls between North Gate of Castle and Black Gate	Newcastle upon Tyne	Wall	Mid 13th century	14 June 1954	NZ2502663917; 54°58′09″N 1°36′38″W	1116305	The Barbican Walls between North Gate of Castle and Black Gate
The Black Gate	Newcastle upon Tyne	Castle	Mid 13th century	14 June 1954	NZ2501363924; 54°58′10″N 1°36′39″W	1024936	The Black Gate More images
The Guildhall and Merchants' Court	Newcastle upon Tyne	Exchange	1655	14 June 1954	NZ2521363833; 54°58′07″N 1°36′28″W	1120877	The Guildhall and Merchants' Court More images
The Castle Keep	Newcastle upon Tyne	Keep	1168–78	14 June 1954	NZ2504363870; 54°58′08″N 1°36′37″W	1320005	The Castle Keep More images
The Tyne Theatre	Newcastle upon Tyne	Theatre	1919	31 May 1974	NZ2436264043; 54°58′13″N 1°37′16″W	1024741	The Tyne Theatre More images
The North Front of Grainger Market	Newcastle upon Tyne	Market Hall	1835	14 June 1954	NZ2477264365; 54°58′24″N 1°36′52″W	1024813	The North Front of Grainger Market More images
The Song School and Choir Vestry	Newcastle upon Tyne	Library and vestry	1736	30 March 1987	NZ2501764002; 54°58′12″N 1°36′39″W	1024769	The Song School and Choir Vestry More images
Theatre Royal	Newcastle upon Tyne	Booking Office	1837	14 June 1954	NZ2494264306; 54°58′22″N 1°36′43″W	1145840	Theatre Royal More images
Theatre Royal Lounge and Restaurant; the Royal Public House	Newcastle upon Tyne	House	c. 1837	14 June 1954	NZ2492464319; 54°58′22″N 1°36′44″W	1087023	Theatre Royal Lounge and Restaurant; the Royal Public House
Newcastle town wall	Newcastle upon Tyne	Town Wall	Late C13/early 14th century	30 March 1987	NZ2483263741; 54°58′04″N 1°36′49″W	1115451	Newcastle town wall More images
Town Wall North of the Close and Breakneck Stairs	Newcastle upon Tyne	Town Wall	Late C13/early 14th century	30 March 1987	NZ2486763633; 54°58′00″N 1°36′47″W	1320260	Town Wall North of the Close and Breakneck Stairs
Town Wall South of Numbers 74–80 Town Wall to Rear of Number 43	Newcastle upon Tyne	Town Wall	Late 13th century	17 December 1971	NZ2447664391; 54°58′25″N 1°37′09″W	1355308	Town Wall South of Numbers 74–80 Town Wall to Rear of Number 43
Town Wall to Rear of Numbers 1–25 Odd	Newcastle upon Tyne	Town Wall	Late 13th century	30 March 1987	NZ2455064433; 54°58′26″N 1°37′05″W	1355241	Town Wall to Rear of Numbers 1–25 Odd
Town Wall with Durham Tower	Newcastle upon Tyne	Tower	Late 13th century	30 March 1987	NZ2438264126; 54°58′16″N 1°37′14″W	1186222	Town Wall with Durham Tower More images
Town Wall, with Morden, Heber and Ever Towers	Newcastle upon Tyne	Tower	Late 13th century	17 December 1971	NZ2440064280; 54°58′21″N 1°37′13″W	1355301	Town Wall, with Morden, Heber and Ever Towers More images
Trinity House	Newcastle upon Tyne	House	Later than early 16th century	14 June 1954	NZ2534964008; 54°58′12″N 1°36′20″W	1024931	Trinity House More images
Trinity House Banqueting Hall and Board Room	Newcastle upon Tyne	Banqueting House	1721	14 June 1954	NZ2536963995; 54°58′12″N 1°36′19″W	1024930	Trinity House Banqueting Hall and Board Room
Trinity House Gate and Chapel	Newcastle upon Tyne	Courtyard	17th century	30 March 1987	NZ2537064009; 54°58′12″N 1°36′19″W	1116418	Trinity House Gate and Chapel
Northumberland Fusiliers Memorial	Newcastle upon Tyne	War Memorial	1923	17 December 1971	NZ2488464954; 54°58′43″N 1°36′46″W	1186201	Northumberland Fusiliers Memorial More images
28 and 30 Close	Newcastle upon Tyne	House	1954	14 June 1954	NZ2505263771; 54°58′05″N 1°36′37″W	1024915	28 and 30 Close More images

== North Tyneside ==
Name	Location	Type	Completed	Date designated	Grid ref. Geo-coordinates	Entry number	Image
Church of Holy Cross	Holy Cross, North Tyneside	Parish Church	12th century	18 August 1947	NZ3052067204; 54°59′55″N 1°31′28″W	1299638	Church of Holy Cross More images
Church of St George	Cullercoats, North Tyneside	Parish Church	1882-4	24 October 1950	NZ3644270837; 55°01′51″N 1°25′53″W	1355000	Church of St George More images

== South Tyneside ==
Name	Location	Type	Completed	Date designated	Grid ref. Geo-coordinates	Entry number	Image
Church of Saint Nicholas	West Boldon, South Tyneside	Church	Early 13th century	25 February 1949	NZ3510461129; 54°56′37″N 1°27′13″W	1355070	Church of Saint Nicholas More images
Church of St Paul	South Tyneside	Church	681-2	18 January 1949	NZ3387965216; 54°58′49″N 1°28′20″W	1355091	Church of St Paul More images
Ruins of Jarrow Monastery	South Tyneside	Church	post Norman	18 January 1949	NZ3388165183; 54°58′48″N 1°28′20″W	1025198	Ruins of Jarrow Monastery More images
Old Town Hall	South Tyneside	Market Cross	1768	27 February 1950	NZ3606467139; 54°59′51″N 1°26′16″W	1232158	Old Town Hall More images

== Sunderland ==
Name	Location	Type	Completed	Date designated	Grid ref. Geo-coordinates	Entry number	Image
Church of Holy Trinity	Sunderland	Parish Church	1719	8 May 1950	NZ4057557189; 54°54′28″N 1°22′07″W	1208056	Church of Holy Trinity More images
Church of St Andrew	Roker, Sunderland	Parish Church	1906-7	8 May 1950	NZ4040759380; 54°55′39″N 1°22′16″W	1207113	Church of St Andrew More images
Church of St Michael and All Angels	Sunderland	Parish Church	Late 12th century	26 April 1950	NZ3418149856; 54°50′32″N 1°28′09″W	1184780	Church of St Michael and All Angels More images
Church of St Peter	Monkwearmouth, Sunderland	Abbey	674-5	8 May 1950	NZ4016857781; 54°54′47″N 1°22′30″W	1217958	Church of St Peter More images
Earl of Durham's Monument	Penshaw, Sunderland	Commemorative Monument	1844	26 April 1950	NZ3340054386; 54°52′59″N 1°28′51″W	1354965	Earl of Durham's Monument More images
Hylton Castle	Castletown, Sunderland	Fortified House	c. 1400	25 February 1949	NZ3578358791; 54°55′21″N 1°26′36″W	1207073	Hylton Castle More images
Hylton Chapel	Castletown, Sunderland	Chapel	12th century	25 February 1949	NZ3583258826; 54°55′22″N 1°26′33″W	1293281	Hylton Chapel More images
Lodge to West of Washington Old Hall	Sunderland	House	Early 17th century	19 December 1947	NZ3107356538; 54°54′09″N 1°31′01″W	1185067	Upload Photo
Phoenix Lodge (freemason's Hall)	Sunderland	Freemasons Hall	1778	20 June 1975	NZ4039457228; 54°54′29″N 1°22′17″W	1279903	Phoenix Lodge (freemason's Hall) More images
Washington Old Hall	Washington, Sunderland	House	Medieval	19 December 1949	NZ3110256555; 54°54′10″N 1°30′59″W	1354971	Washington Old Hall More images
