= Grainger =

Grainger may refer to:

== Places ==
=== United States ===
- Grainger County, Tennessee, a county
- Grainger Stadium, a sports venue in Kinston, North Carolina
- Grainger Generating Station, a former coal-fired power plant located in Conway, South Carolina
- Graingers, North Carolina

=== Elsewhere ===
- Grainger, Alberta, a locality in Canada
- Grainger Falls, a waterfall in Chalky Inland, Fiordland, New Zealand
- Grainger Town, a historic centre of Newcastle upon Tyne, England
  - Grainger Market, a covered market in Newcastle upon Tyne, England

== People ==
- Grainger (surname)

== Companies ==
- Grainger Games, a British video game retailer
- Grainger Industrial Supply or W. W. Grainger, a Fortune 500 industrial supply company
- Grainger plc, a British residential property company

== Other ==
- Grainger College of Engineering, a part of the University of Illinois Urbana Champaign

== See also ==
- Granger (disambiguation)
- Grangier, a surname
