= Granger =

Granger may refer to:

== People and fictional characters ==
- Granger (surname), a list of people and fictional characters
- Granger (given name), a list of people and fictional characters
- Granger (Tourtechot) (c. 1680s–1734), French physician and traveller known as Granger, presumably his surname
- Granger, a person involved in the National Grange of the Order of Patrons of Husbandry (the Grange Movement)

== Places ==
=== United States ===
- Granger, Indiana, a census-designated place
- Granger, Iowa, a city
- Granger, Minnesota, an unincorporated community
- Granger, Missouri, a village
- Granger, New York, a town
- Granger, Ohio, an unincorporated community
- Granger, Texas, a city
- Granger Township, Ohio
- Granger, one of the two communities that formed Granger-Hunter, Utah, a former census-designated place
- Granger, Washington, a city
- Granger, Wyoming, a town
- Granger Lake, Texas
- Fort Granger, Franklin, Tennessee, a Union fort during the Civil War

=== Haiti ===
- Granger, Grand'Anse, a rural settlement

== Other uses ==
- Granger High School (disambiguation), three schools in the United States
- LaGrange Grangers, a minor league baseball team based in LaGrange, Georgia, from 1913 to 1917
- Granger and Advanced Granger, alien builder classes in the video game Tremulous

== See also ==
- Granger's Index to Poetry, a reference work
- Granger Archaeopteryx, a 1920s British monoplane
- Granger House (disambiguation), various American houses on the National Register of Historic Places
- Granger Cottage, Ontario County, New York, on the National Register of Historic Places
- Granger Building, San Diego, California, a historic building
- Granger Laws, a series of laws promoted by the Grange Movement in the late 1860s and early 1870s
- Granger causality, a statistical test
- Grainger (disambiguation)
