= Lester Hotel =

Historic hotel building, San Diego, California, U.S.

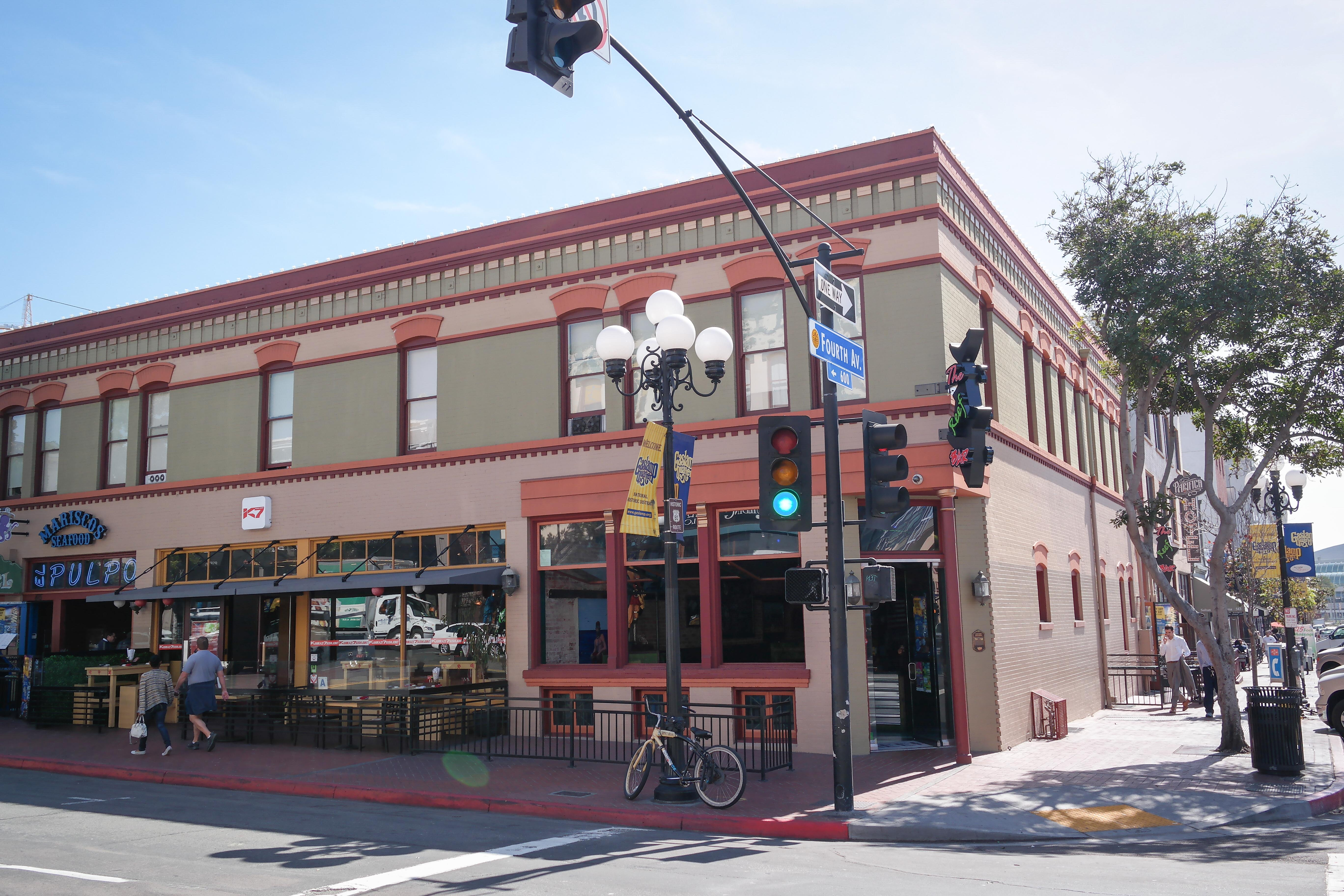
- The building's exterior in 2014
- Interactive map of the Lester Hotel area

General information
- Type: Hotel
- Location: 417 Market Street, San Diego, United States
- Coordinates: 32°42′41″N 117°09′39″W
- Opened: 1905

The Lester Hotel building is an historic structure located at 417 Market Street in the Gaslamp Quarter, San Diego, California.

Built in 1906, the original architect was William Quayle who also designed the Granger Building at 964 5th Avenue. This building was white pressed brick with a composition roof, basement and exterior stairway on the east side. The building was renovated and enlarged in 1914 by architects Charles and Edward Quayle, sons of William Quayle.

To the right of the entrance, the Gaslamp Quarter Historic Building marker inscription reads (marker number 5): "The first floor of this building has a colorful tenant history. The Goodwill Bar operated from 1906 to 1945. In 1945, Mike McIntosh and Sam Dini purchased the business. They were responsible for the 'McDini' corned beef sandwich of local fame. In 1923, Aurelis Abito opened the International Pool Hall. Abito was a pioneer member of San Diego's Filipino Community. The second floor was known as Hotel Lester from 1915 to 1984."

During the 1920s Bertha “Bonnie” White transformed the first floor into a "respectable" brothel within the Stingaree Red Light District. From 1930 to 1940, Bonnie was the proprietress of the Hotel Lester and operated the successful business. A wire or creaking mechanism under the 13th step alerted the ladies upstairs to police raids so they could escape down the back stairway. This ended in 1940 when a new police chief led to the closure of the brothel.

== See also ==
- List of Gaslamp Quarter historic buildings
