= Granger House =

Granger House may refer to:

in the United States (by state then town or city)

- Granger House (Marion, Iowa), listed on the National Register of Historic Places (NRHP) in Linn County
- Francis Granger House, Canandaigua, New York, NRHP-listed
- Granger Cottage, Canandaigua, New York, NRHP-listed
- Granger House and The Perch, Austin, Texas, NRHP-listed

== See also ==
- Granger Hall (historic place), National City, California, NRHP-listed
- Granger Station, Granger, Wyoming, NRHP-listed
- The Grange (disambiguation)
- List of Grange Hall buildings
