= Grangier =

Grangier is a surname. Notable people with the surname include:

- Gilles Grangier (1911–1996), French film director and screenwriter
- India Grangier (born 2000), French cyclist
- Michel Grangier (born 1948), French sport wrestler

== See also ==
- Granger (disambiguation)
