= Holy Jesus Hospital =

Historic building in Newcastle upon Tyne, England

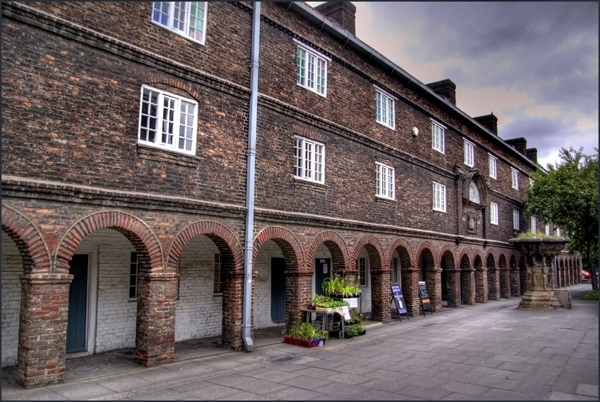
- Front of the Holy Jesus Hospital by David Ord
- Established: 2000 (in current form, see article)
- Location: Newcastle upon Tyne
- Coordinates: 54.9715°N 1.6078°W
- Type: Almshouse
- Website: NT Website

The Holy Jesus Hospital is a working office in Newcastle upon Tyne, England, in the care of the National Trust. It is a Grade II* listed building.

The site of the hospital has been in use for 700 years helping the townspeople. There was an Augustinian Priory on the site from the thirteenth century, then an almshouse for housing retired freemen, then a soup kitchen was built next to Almshouse in the nineteenth century, before the site acquired its current function as a working office. The building also serves as the base for the Inner City Project of the National Trust. This project takes people of ages 12–25 and over 50 out to the countryside in order to increase appreciation of the city's natural surroundings.

The building is of architectural interest because it still retains architectural elements from many previous centuries, including a 14th-century sacristy wall and 16th-century tower connected with the King's Council of the North. It is also one of only two intact 17th-century brick buildings that survive in the city, the other being Alderman Fenwick's House nearby.

== Augustinian Priory (1291–1539) ==
In the 13th century, Newcastle upon Tyne had a population of around 4,000; and it was difficult for the four parish churches to care for the needs of such a large population. The priests were expected to be educators, doctors and counsellors, as well as meeting the spiritual needs of their parishioners. Therefore, in 1291 land was donated by William Baron of Wark on Tweed to found an Augustinian priory on the land on which the museum now stands.

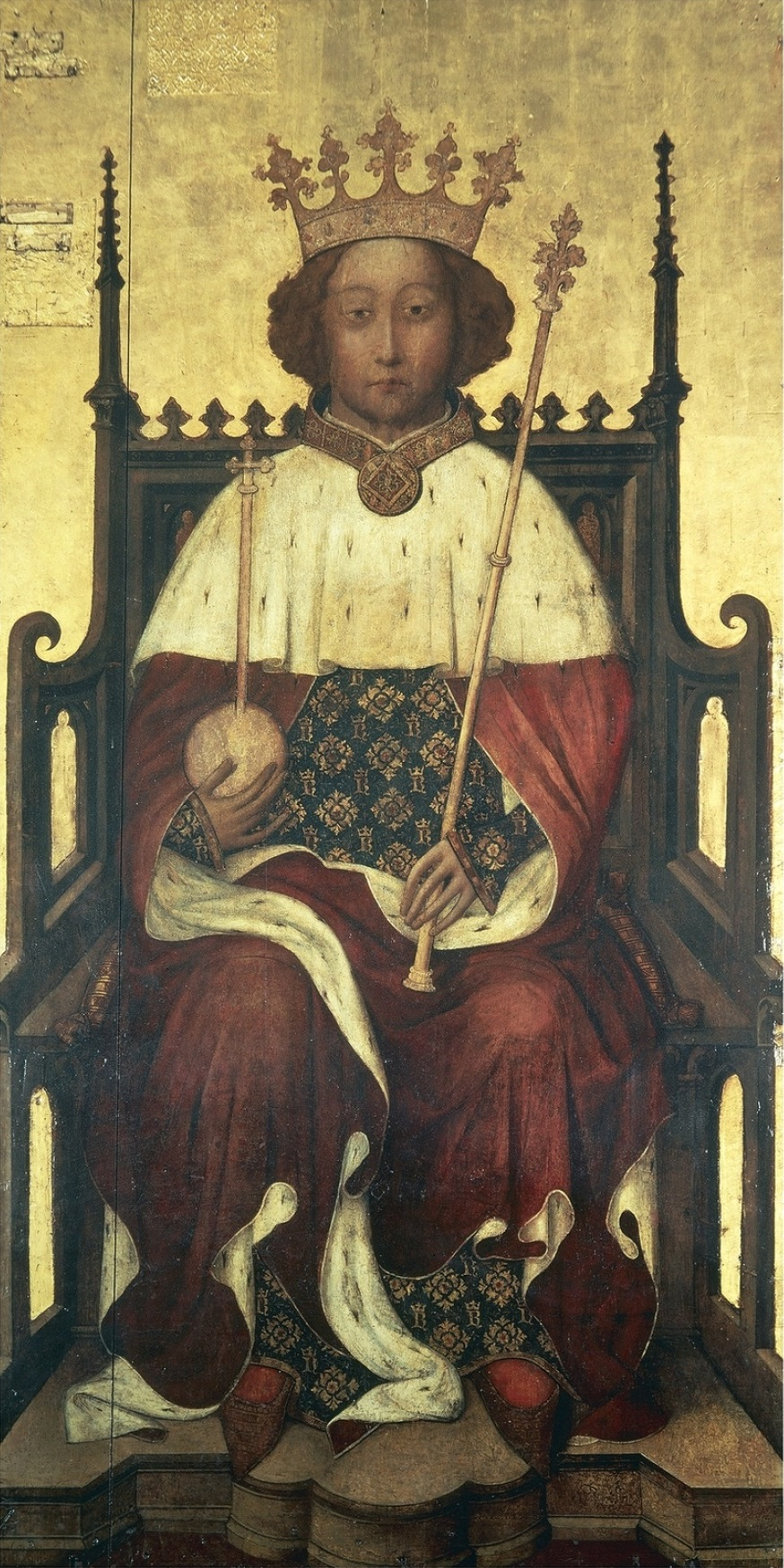
Richard II, who issued a proclamation banning the dumping of waste near the priory site

The Augustinian Friars were originally an order of hermits in northern Italy who Pope Alexander IV first congregated into a single body in 1256. The Order spread to France and then to England after being invited by Richard de Clare, 6th Earl of Hertford, to found Clare Priory in Suffolk, by the River Stour. On 3 September 1249, de Clare was able to obtain a writ of protection for the friars from the King. The brethren were clothed in black and observed the rule of St Augustine of Hippo. Augustianian friars had been in England since 1250 and they helped by preaching and healing in the community.

The priory was also used as a lodgings house because it was on one of the main roads to the north. On the day that King Edward I passed through Newcastle in December 1299 the brethren each received three shillings and four pence (3s. 4d). In 1306, the King also granted the monastery additional lands to enlarge the burial ground. Richard II directed the bailiffs of the city to issue a proclamation against dumping waste near the site. Apparently some local people threw "excrements, filth, and garbage, in a certain way that led near to the house of the Austin Friars, to their great annoyance and peril."

It is possible that the site was used by English kings before its later use as a temporary seat for the Council of the North after the Dissolution of the Monasteries. Henry Bourne, an 18th-century historian of Newcastle upon Tyne wrote of the site: "the Kings of England since the Conquest, kept house in it, whence they came with an Army Royal against Scotland, and since the Suppression of the Monasteries, made a Magazine and Store-house for the North Parts."

Bourne also suggests that the use of the site as a religious centre might predate the Augustinian priory. He wrote, "the same authority tells us also, that there was an ancient Religious House founded by the Kings of Northumberland and that several of them were buried here; but it cannot be true that they built any Thing for the St Austin Fryers, for they came not into England 'till long after the Conquest, in the year 1252."

== Dissolution of the Monasteries (1539) ==
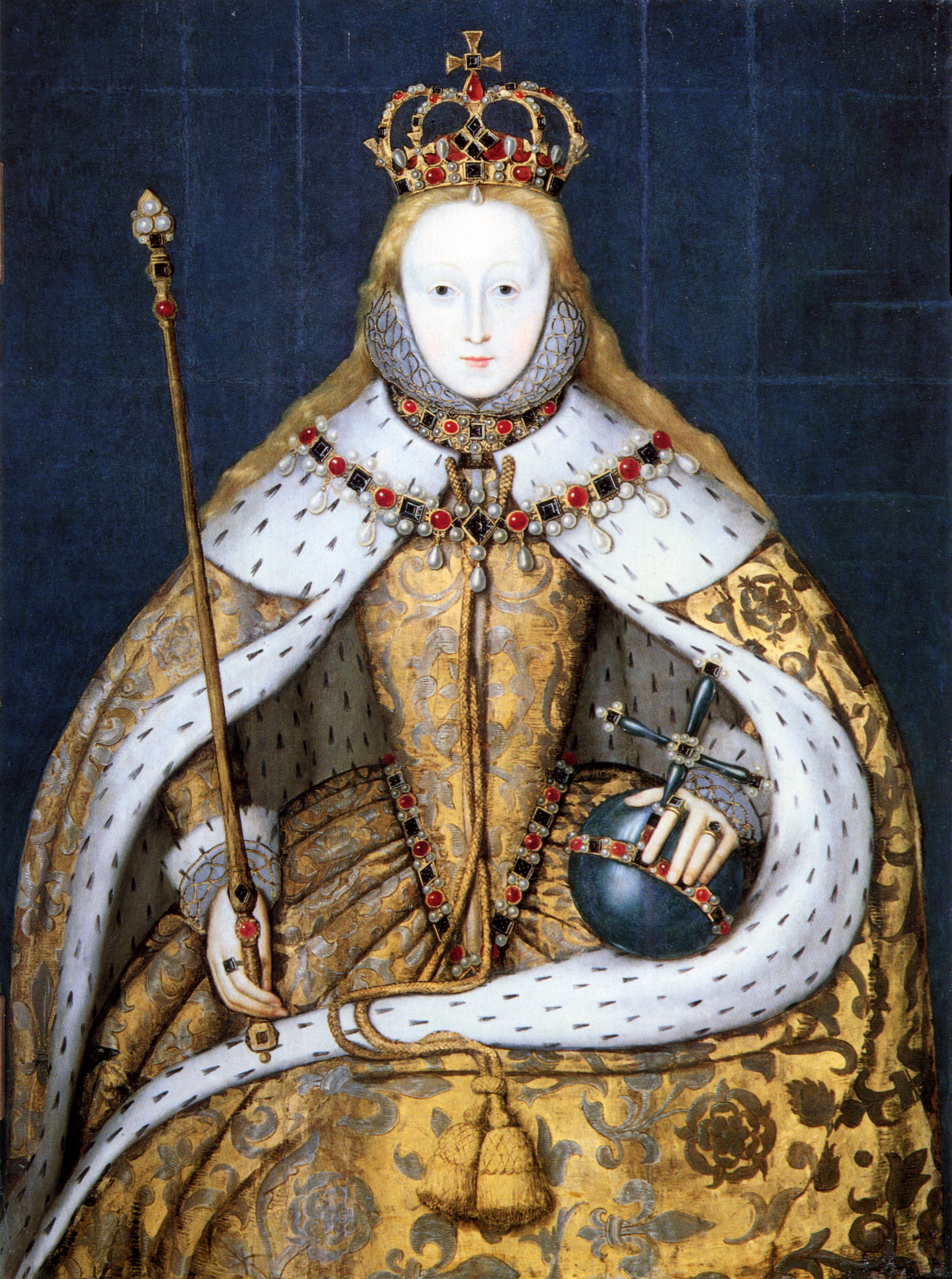
Elizabeth I decreed that the Kings Council of the North meet at the Priory site for 20 days of the year

In 1539, the priory was seized by the crown along with five others mendicant houses in the area including the Dominican or Blackfriars Priory. At the time of its capture the priory had seven brethren and three novices including the prior, Andrew Kell. The monks and nuns were pensioned and the friars received gratuities. Some took jobs as chantry priests or accommodation in parish livings. Those nuns who were of good birth returned to their families. The bells, lead plate and vestments were turned over to the crown. Most of the building and lands were sold to the lesser gentry, new nobility, and town merchants or to borough corporations.

In 1537, Thomas Cromwell was asked if the Austin Priory site could be left intact after the dissolution, to be used as northern headquarters of the King's Council of the North when it was not sitting at York. It was rarely used for this purpose (Elizabeth I decreed that the council spend 20 days a year there). It appears that in 1551 the site was granted to John Dudley, 1st Duke of Northumberland "as parcel of Tynemouth Monastery." In 1553, Richard Benson occurs as keeper of this house for the crown for a fee of 40s per annum. In the map of the city by John Speed in 1610, the site appears as 'Kings Manour'. It was much dilapidated by 1595. During the confused period of the English Civil War, it passed into the hands of the Corporation. The area became known as Kings Manor which was a short lived counterpart to the famous King's Manor at York. Military drills were performed by the townspeople at an area called the artillery ground. All that remains of the priory is part of the sacristy wall, though a model in the interpretation room gives a possible layout of some of the friary buildings.

=== The tower ===
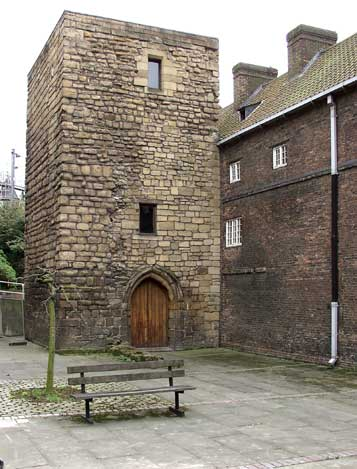
The Tower

The tower was constructed sometime between the Dissolution and the Union of the Crowns but the exact date is not known. It was probably constructed as a strong room to store munitions or provide a secure location if the city walls were breached. This turned the ground floor room into a lock-up where troublesome citizens would be thrown until they came before the law to be punished. Much about the tower has changed. The wall to the right of the door is 13th-century, while the dividing wall including the door is 18th-century.

== Private ownership (1605–1646) ==
In 1605, the tower and priory buildings were given by James I of England to George Home, 1st Earl of Dunbar. In the same year, Home was also made a Knight of the Garter and received his Earldom of Dunbar. Bourne quotes one of his sources as saying, "a Scot did beg it (the Hospital) of King James; after that took the lead off it and sold it; but it was cast away before it came to its market." Also in 1605, Home consolidated all the lands given to him into a free Earldom, Lordship of Parliament and Barony of Dunbar. The site was one of many Home acquired under the patronage of the king including the Manor and Castle of Norlan and the Castle of St Andrews. Home died in Whitehall, London, in 1611 without a male heir and thus his Earldom and Barony became extinct. A Captain Dykes became the next owner of the land. Bourne wrote 'He (George Home) sold also some stones to Sir Peter Riddel, who with them built the south end of his fine house; but now it belongs to Captain Dykes, and his posterity hath no right.' The site disappears from the historical record until 1646 when it is recorded as being owned by the council.

== The Hospital (1646–1825) ==
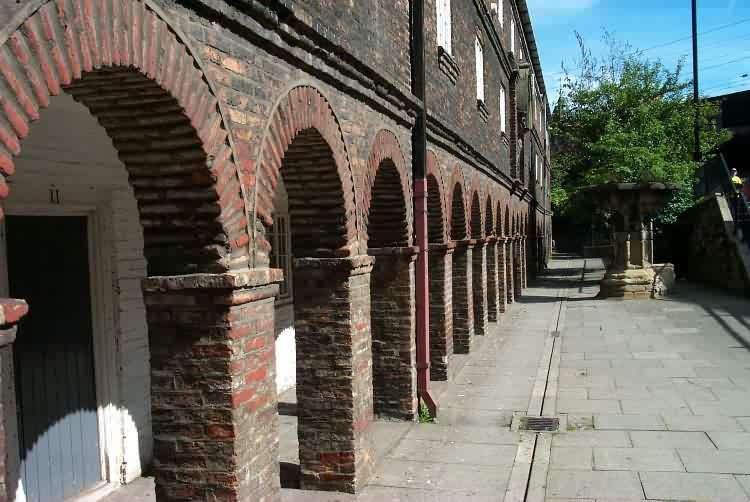
Entrance to the Holy Jesus Hospital

The Holy Jesus Hospital was built in 1681 by public subscription to house retired Freemen, their widows or unmarried sons or daughters. The hospital was commonly known by local people as the "Freeman's Hospital" and the "Town's Hospital" but on 26 March 1684 the building was incorporated by the name of the master, brethren, and sisters of the Hospital of the holy Jesus. The Mayor, alderman and Common Council of Newcastle were appointed as visitors and charged with setting the rules for the hospital. Shortly afterwards the founders bought a quay and garden, in the Close for £700 and an estate in Edderly, County Durham for £1610, and another estate at Whittle, Northumberland for £1300 and the master and brethren of the hospital were settled across these properties. The building itself was constructed using brick construction which was then a relatively new method (brick was usually used as an infill for timber-framed buildings). Indeed, the structure is one of only two 17th-century brick buildings in Newcastle upon Tyne, the other being nearby Alderman Fenwick's House in Pilgrim Street. To be allocated a room, one had to meet the committee's criteria and once were admitted one had to abide by the master's rules. It remained in use until 1937, when the new hospital was built at Spital Towers. Strict rules governed the "inmates" including being locked in their rooms at 9 pm and having their doors unlocked again at 6 am. There were no children allowed, and the inmates were instructed to attend church each week and take the sacrament. Each year the residents would have been given a free suit of clothing, a measure of coal and, if the charity allowed it, some pocket money (Alms).

The first master of the house was a man named Thomas Lewen, a merchant by trade. The master's seal had a cross engraved on it and bore the words "Sigillum Hospitalis Sancti Jesu in Novo Castro." The original allowance for the inmates of the hospital was 20 shillings per 'quarterly', while the master would get 30 shillings. On 2 January 1752, the council decreed that forty 'fothers' of coal be given to the hospital annually and, on 18 December 1769, the master was required to be paid £8, and each inmate sister £6 per annum. By the early 19th century this allowance had increased to £13 for each inmate per annum, four fothers of 'best Benwell' coals as well as providing clothing. In addition to this the inmates were required to see the Mayor at the Guildhall once each quarter where grievances would be heard. The inmates could also receive money from charities, and this was often called escutcheon money.

In 1705, the inmates of the Newcastle House of Correction were commissioned to produce 'purple and grey cloth' for the uniforms of the widows of the Holy Jesus Hospital.

There is an inscription in Latin on the front on the building. Roughly translated it reads;

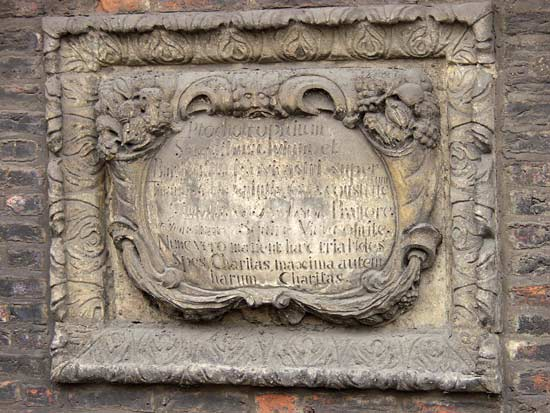
Plaque celebrating the creation of the Hospital

"Hospital for poor people by the expense of the citizens and leaders of Newcastle upon Tyne in the year of salvation 1683. Built by Timothy Robson, Mayor, John Squire Sheriff, but now only remains the three of Faith Hope and Charity, and the greatest of these is Charity."

In 1646, the council allowed the Barber Surgeons to build their hall just east of the site: this agreement was given on 15 March 1647. In 1648, the plot of land was leased to the barber surgeons on condition that they constructed their hall within two years and that part of the site was to be laid out as a garden for medicinal herbs. A second hall built in 1730 disappeared under the railway viaduct in the 1840s. The most aged claimants were preferred for placements at the Hospital and on 22 March 1779, the Mayor and common council of Newcastle ordered that several candidates produce certificates to prove their respective ages, to be filed in the town-clerk's office.

== Nineteenth century ==
St. Mary Magdalene Hospital, Newcastle-upon-Tyne Act 1867
- Act of Parliament
- Parliament of the United Kingdom
- Long title: An Act providing for the Management, Improvement, and better Government, and for extending the Objects and regulating the Appropriation of the Income, of the Hospital of Saint Mary Magdalene in the Town and County of Newcastle-upon-Tyne.
- Citation: 30 & 31 Vict. c. vii

Dates
- Royal assent: 12 April 1867
Other legislation
Repealed by	Tyne and Wear Act 1980

Status: Repealed

Text of statute as originally enacted

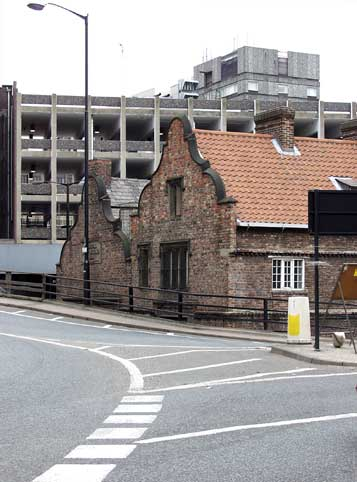
Today the site is surrounded by modern constructions

While the modern site is heavily enclosed by modern constructions, particularly Swan House roundabout, Mackenzie, in 1827, portrays a much more open space:

This hospital is finely situated on a small eminence, which is ascended by steps from the Manor Chare. It faces the south, and is a good brick building, three stories high. The under story is adorned with piazzas, which are 91 feet in length, and make a very agreeable walk, a small field being in front, which is separated from the street by a low stone wall and a light iron paling. About the middle of the piazza is the entrance to the second and third stories, each of which has a light gallery that extends the whole length of the building. At the foot of the stairs is a poor-box, and the figure of Charity; and, opposite to the entrance, an ornamented fountain for the use of the hospital. This building contains 42 rooms, each 13 feet by 12 feet; and every room has a small coal-house in the back-yard. They are now all rendered more comfortable than formerly; and some of the magistrates occasionally visit the hospital, as was the practice in former times.

A soup kitchen was built in 1880, replacing the police station which adjoined the hospital on the west side, by public subscription and dispensed soup to the ‘deserving poor’ until 1891. The soup was not free: it cost half a pence per pint. People who had donated each had a number of tickets which they could give to those people who they believed qualified for the ration. The deserving poor in Victorian times were those unable to work during the winter months. Those individuals classed as undeserving were those whose poverty was deemed to be caused by indolence and alcoholism. A recent article has suggested that the soup provided by the kitchen was highly nutritious. The kitchen was open from December to March, seven days a week, weather permitting. Advertisements were placed in local newspapers such as the Daily Chronicle and The Journal and Courant to solicit donations for the kitchen. The donations were used to pay the kitchen staff and buy the provisions for the soup. The names of prominent contributors were also listed in those newspapers and annual receipts and expenditures were also published in the press. The kitchen was run by a committee of prominent townsmen, including Thomas Pumphrey, Henry E Armstrong, James Joicey and the banker Thomas Hodgkin.

Lynn Redhead, customer services administrator at the Holy Jesus Hospital, has described what the kitchen would have looked like in the following way:

"People wanting soup came in through an 18-inch wide brick-lined corridor one at a time to be served from troughs. Nine copper boilers were on the first floor of the building with storage below where raw materials were weighed to be hoisted up. They were making 100 gallons of soup at a time, that’s 800 people all queuing at the back of the building."

In 1881, the committee from the Discharged Prisoner's Aid Society asked to use the building when it was not in use for discharged female convicts from the prison at Carliol Square (1828–1925) to do laundry work and the Society continued to use it for this purpose until the turn of the century. Between 1882 and 1883 City Road was built over the front lawn of the Hospital.

The soup kitchen closed in 1891. The building was leased to pork butcher F.G Thompson, who made alterations to the building presumably to separate his business from the laundry and ex-convicts. Urwins Chemical Factory operated on the site from 1913, producing industrial and domestic chemicals and pharmaceuticals as well as filing first aid boxes until 1961 when it moved to Stepney bank in Ouseburn. In 1937, the Council decided that the hospital was no longer fit to house people because the area around the almshouse was very unhealthy. Therefore, a new hospital was built at Spital Tongues. Some of the building's original fixtures were moved to the new site at this time.

=== The Peoples Kitchen ===
The 19th-century soup kitchen inspired 'The People's Kitchen', a 20th-century charity organization dedicated to helping Newcastle's homeless. The People's Kitchen was founded by 76-year-old Alison Kay who was moved to help the homeless after finding an unidentified man dead under a bush in Newcastle. First she held a "friendship picnic" attended by four homeless men in which she delivered flasks of tea and sandwiches prepared in her own kitchen. Then, after liaising with the police and social services she inaugurated The People's Kitchen. After occupying temporary premises in Blenheim Street, the people's hospital moved its headquarters to Bath Lane, Newcastle, in 1997 and distributes clothing and equipment to the homeless.

== The first museum: The John George Joicey Museum (1950–1993) ==
In the late 1960s, the Museum Board was looking to have more museums in Newcastle and thought the Holy Jesus Hospital could be used. The fact that the building had stood empty for decades meant that the condition of the building had suffered greatly. The restoration cost £67,000, the money coming from the John George Joicey bequest of 1968 and a new roof was needed. During the restoration some of the original fabric of the building such as door frames, doors and walls on the top floor were lost. In 1971 John George Joicey Museum opened. During this time the soup kitchens were joined to the Holy Jesus Hospital. The first floor rooms were used for teaching the history of Newcastle from the Roman period to the present date. There were period rooms illustrating living styles from the early Stuart to late Victorian periods. Much of the collection was donated by bequest by John George Joicey, a Gateshead businessman and owner of the mining company James Joicey & Co. Ltd, and after whom the museum was named. Joicey was also a prominent donor to the Laing Art Gallery. The tower of the hospital had the Alnwick Armoury and the Shotley Bridge Sword makers displays on the first and second floors. The Shotley Bridge Sword makers were sword makers and knifemakers from Solingen, Germany who settled in Shotley Bridge, Durham, in 1690. The soup kitchen was mainly used as a Victorian schoolroom where children were dressed and taught as Victorian children would have been. There were also audio-visual presentations that illustrated the Tyne Flood of 1771 and the Great Fire of 1854. Part of the museum was devoted to the Northumberland Hussars and the 15th and 19th Regiments of the King's Royal Hussars. The museum's location combined with the city's underpasses and roads system made access to the museum difficult and it was little visited. In 1993, the museum closed and all artifacts were taken to the Discovery Museum on Blandford Street. These included the effigy of a knight from the 15th century that was found next to the sacristy wall outside the tower.

== The Inner City Project (2000) ==
The Holy Jesus Hospital has been the centre of the National Trust's Inner City Project. By August 2004, £800,000 had been spent on renovating the building. Funds for the restoration of the site came from the Heritage Lottery Fund and the Tyne and Wear Partnership. The project had been running since 1987 in the east end of Newcastle working with young people from 12-25 and with the over 50s, taking them out to the countryside. The National Trust needed a central office to expand their work into other inner city areas, so a 25-year lease was negotiated with the council. The Exhibition Room on the site features touch screens and 3D models to help teach people about the site's history of helping the townspeople. In the book The Remains of Distant Times: Archaeology and the National Trust, Priscilla Boniface criticizes what she believes to be the National Trust's lack of interest in operating in urban environments but praises the Inner City Project as a step towards rectifying this. She wrote "Its occasional ventures - such as the Newcastle Inner City Project...by their frequent mention in National Trust communications, merely serve to underline how few of their type the Trust has to call on for report." She argues that although the aim of introducing town dwellers to the countryside is "laudable", the "respectful and serious suggestion might be made, though, that a person or person's might be usefully employed also with the objective of raising National Trust people's understanding of and confidence in their ability to visit and enjoy, or at least encounter, the city." However, Collins and Kay cite research suggesting that the scheme has been effective in promoting "social inclusion". They note, however, that the project has been limited by the funds made available to it.

== Notable visitors to the site ==
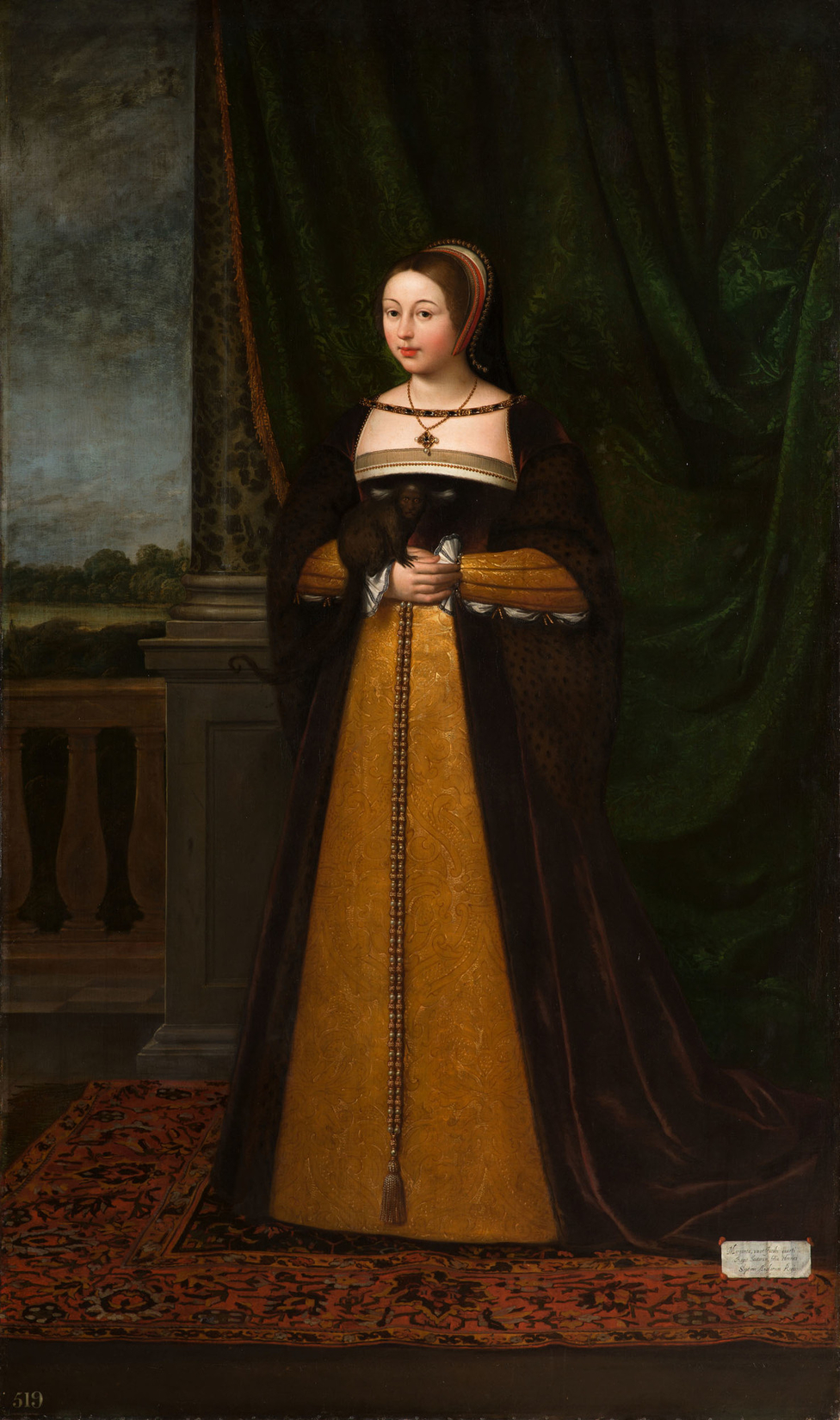
Queen Margaret by Daniel Mytens

- Princess Margaret Tudor – daughter of Henry VII spent four days there in 1503 on her journey north to marry James IV of Scotland
- Thomas Howard, 4th Duke of Norfolk, stayed there in 1560. As a result, £67 was spent on materials and repairs: the walls were re-pointed, roof lead re-laid, gutters and broken windows repaired, a chimney rebuilt, dining chamber on the Great Hall enlarged, two doors cut through a wall and the construction of a new stone window. Materials purchased included 4000 bricks and a considerable amount of glass from Hartlepool. Norfolk was imprisoned nine years later by Elizabeth I for plotting to marry Mary, Queen of Scots.
- Eric XIV of Sweden visited in 1561 for which the Great Hall was whitewashed and hung with borrowed tapestries for his visit.

== See also ==
- Augustinians
- Dissolution of the Monasteries
- Council of the North
- Blackfriars, Newcastle upon Tyne
- National Trust
- Discovery Museum
- Eric XIV of Sweden
- George Home, 1st Earl of Dunbar
- Thomas Howard, 4th Duke of Norfolk
- Princess Margaret Tudor
- History of Newcastle upon Tyne
