= Roy Gordon Grainger =

New Zealand physicist

- Born: 19 February 1962 (age 64); Thames, New Zealand
- Education: University of Auckland
- Known for: Aerosol and Cloud Remote Sensing
- Scientific career
- Fields: Remote Sensing, Atmospheric Physics
- Workplaces: University of Oxford, St Hugh's College

Roy Gordon Grainger (born 19 February 1962) is a New Zealand physicist. He is head of the Earth Observation Data Group in the Atmospheric, Oceanic and Planetary Physics Sub-Department at the University of Oxford and a Tutorial Fellow in Physics at St Hugh's College, Oxford.

== Education ==
Grainger was educated at Auckland Grammar School before attending the University of Auckland to read physics. He gained a Doctorate in Atmospheric Physics on the subject of remote sensing of cloud properties, where his supervisor was Stuart Bradley. The title of his doctoral thesis was The calculation of cloud parameters from AVHRR data. He worked for a short time in UV research at the New Zealand Meteorological Service before taking up a post-doctoral position in the Physics Department in Oxford, where his research was focused on measurement of stratospheric aerosols using the ISAMS satellite instrument designed at Oxford.

In 1998, he returned to New Zealand to accept a Lectureship at the University of Canterbury, where he conducted new instrumental work to measure aerosol properties.

== Research ==
Grainger is the Principal Investigator of the Optimal Retrieval of Aerosol and Cloud (ORAC) project, which is a community code to optimally estimate aerosol and cloud properties from satellite imagery, and was principally responsible for starting this project.

The Earth Observation Data Group which he heads is primarily interested in atmospheric trace gases and clouds (especially with regard to processes which control climate), and conducts satellite studies of atmospheric aerosols.

== Personal life ==
Grainger lives in Oxford, England, and is the great-grandson of Alfred Henry Grainger, after whom Grainger Falls is named.
