= Grainger Falls =

Waterfall in Fiordland National Park, New Zealand

- Interactive map of Grainger Falls
- Location: Fiordland National Park
- Coordinates: 45°59′09″S 166°31′55″E
- Watercourse: Grainger Stream

Grainger Falls is a waterfall in Fiordland, New Zealand. It is a combination of a tiered and fan type waterfall.

Grainger Falls was first recorded by Andreas Reischek, an Austrian who explored New Zealand in the 1880s. He named the waterfall after his friend Alfred Grainger. Its exact location was established on 6 February 2006, by David Richards and Roy Gordon Grainger. As the stream which drains Lake Hector and contains the waterfall was unnamed, the NZ Geographic Naming Board called it Grainger Stream. Grainger Falls and Stream are now recorded in the New Zealand Gazetteer of Official Geographic Names. They are shown on the West Cape (CF04) map which is part of the NZ Topo50 series.

== See also ==
- List of waterfalls,
- Waterfalls of New Zealand
