= Phoenix Lodge =

Masonic hall in Sunderland, England

Phoenix Lodge No. 94
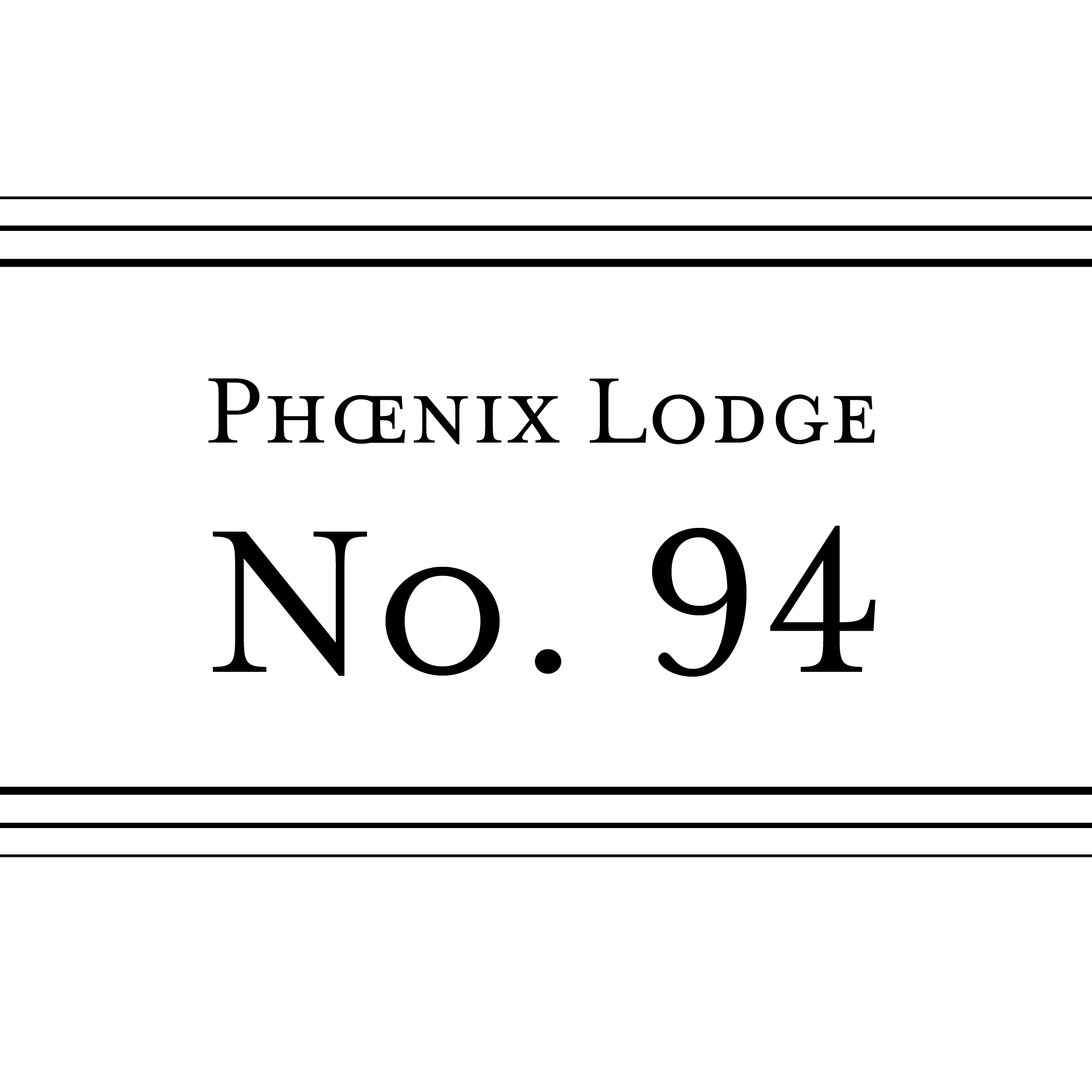

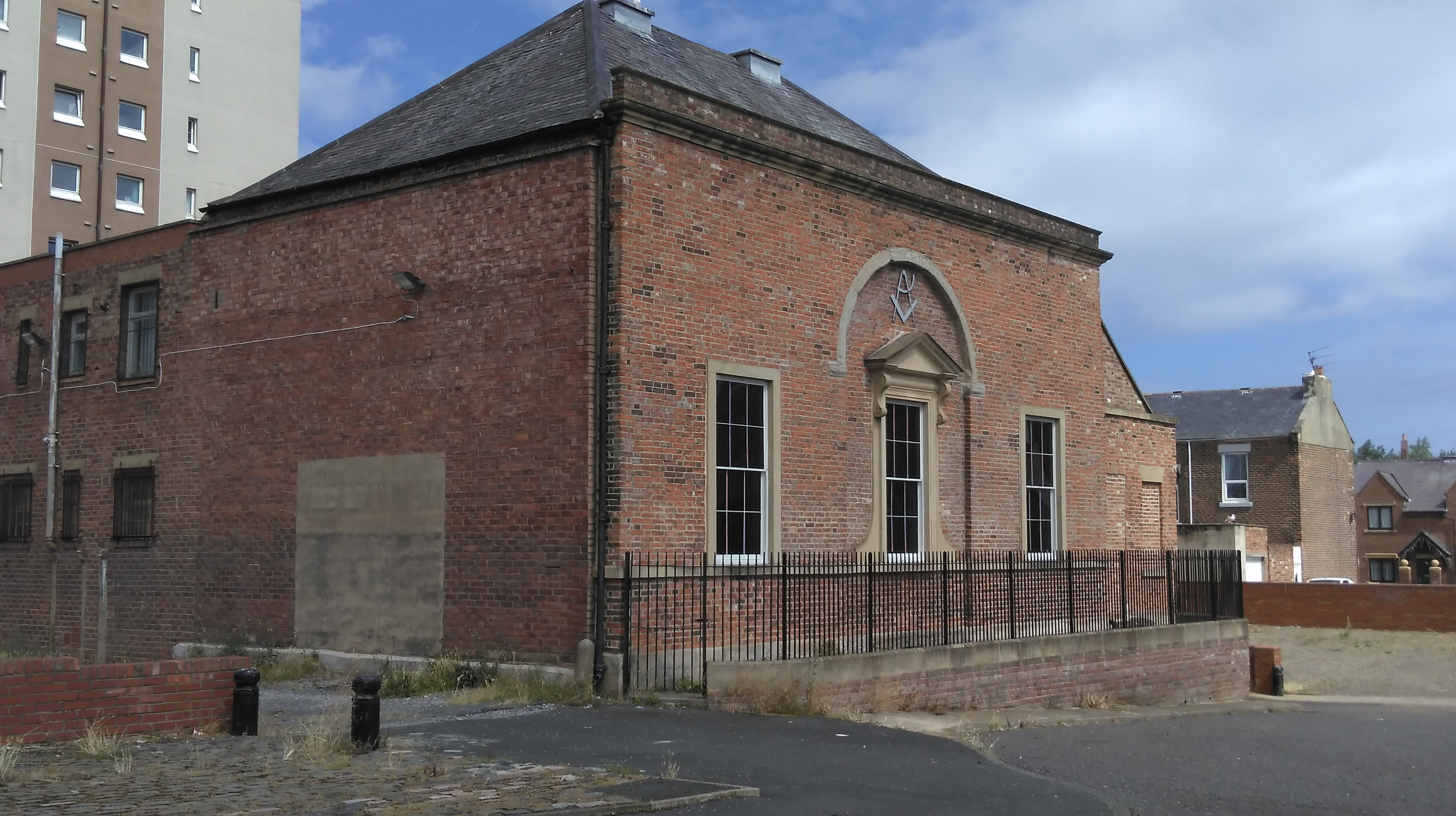
- Formation: October 7, 1755; 270 years ago
- Location: Sunderland
- Coordinates: 54.909°N 1.369°W
- Parent organization: United Grand Lodge of England
- Website: p94.uk

Phoenix Lodge No. 94 is a Craft Lodge in Freemasonry under the jurisdiction of the United Grand Lodge of England. Members of Phoenix Lodge built the Freemasons' Hall in Queen Street East, Sunderland, in 1785; it is considered to be the oldest purpose-built Masonic Temple in the world that has been in continuous use from its foundation and is still used as such today. The Hall is a Grade I listed building. Phoenix is also the oldest Lodge in the city of Sunderland and the second oldest in the Province of Durham.

== History ==
The Lodge was constituted on 7 October 1755 and is one of the 50 oldest craft lodges in the UK. Phoenix originally met in local inns and taverns before moving to the Masonic Hall in Vine Street, which was dedicated on 16 July 1778 but was destroyed by fire on 20 November 1783. It has met at its present Masonic Hall in Queen Street East since 1785. In April 1785, noting the celebrations for the dedication of this new hall, a local newspaper announced that Handel's Messiah would be:

"Performed [at St John's Chapel] by the whole Choir of Durham Cathedral, assisted by all the principal Musical Gentlemen of Durham, Newcastle, and Sunderland, under the Direction of Brother Ebdon, who will perform the full accompanyments [sic] on the Organ."

The original Institution Warrant was lost, believed to be destroyed by the fire that destroyed the Masonic Temple in Vine Street. The Lodge still has the Confirmation Warrant, dated 29 September 1821. It received the Bi-Centenary Warrant on 5 October 1955 and celebrated its 250th anniversary on 7 October 2005.

The lodge building contains a pipe organ by the north-east organ builder John Donaldson (died 1807), the only extant example of Donaldson's work in its original position; here high up on its own purpose-built gallery.

== Meeting Places ==
Although Phoenix Lodge has the longest continuous usage of a Masonic meeting place in the world today, the Lodge has in fact met at various locations throughout its history.

The Meeting Places of Phoenix Lodge No.94 (from foundation to present)
Year	Venue
1755	Golden Lion Inn
1756	Masons Arms
1764	Sign of the King
1766	Nag's Head, Church Street
1768	King's Arms
1770	Golden Lion Inn
1778	Freemasons' Hall, Vine Street
1783	Bro. Jowsey's George Hotel
1785	Freemasons' Hall, Queen Street East

== Lodge Number ==
Phoenix is numbered 94 on the register of the United Grand Lodge of England, a roll that totals nearly 10,000 lodges. Although there are 93 lodges with a lower number than Phoenix, some of them are of later date. This is because at the Union of the Grand Lodges in 1813, some were allocated new numbers by criteria other than that of "ancient rights". At the foundation of the Lodge, the number was 207, which changed at various points, finally to 94 in the year 1863.

== Ritual ==
Before the unification of the Grand Lodges to form the United Grand Lodge of England in 1813, Phoenix Lodge was a member of the Premier Grand Lodge (the Moderns) which pre-dated the Antient Grand Lodge (the Antients) by 34 years. In keeping with these traditional roots, the Lodge works Old Working of the Craft ritual, as opposed to the more modern Emulation Working, which has become common in Craft lodges throughout the English-speaking world. A unique feature of the Lodge's ritual is that the ceremonial contains singing and music accompaniment throughout.

== Masters of Phoenix Lodge ==
The records extant detail the Masters of the Lodge from 1775 to the present day - records from 1755 to 1774 have been lost.
The first recorded Master of Phoenix Lodge was John Thornhill, a local merchant in Sunderland. Phoenix Lodge has produced one Provincial Grand Master of Durham, George Thompson in 1778.
