= Granger House and The Perch =

Pair of historic homes in Austin, Texas

- Granger House and the Perch
- U.S. National Register of Historic Places
- Recorded Texas Historic Landmark
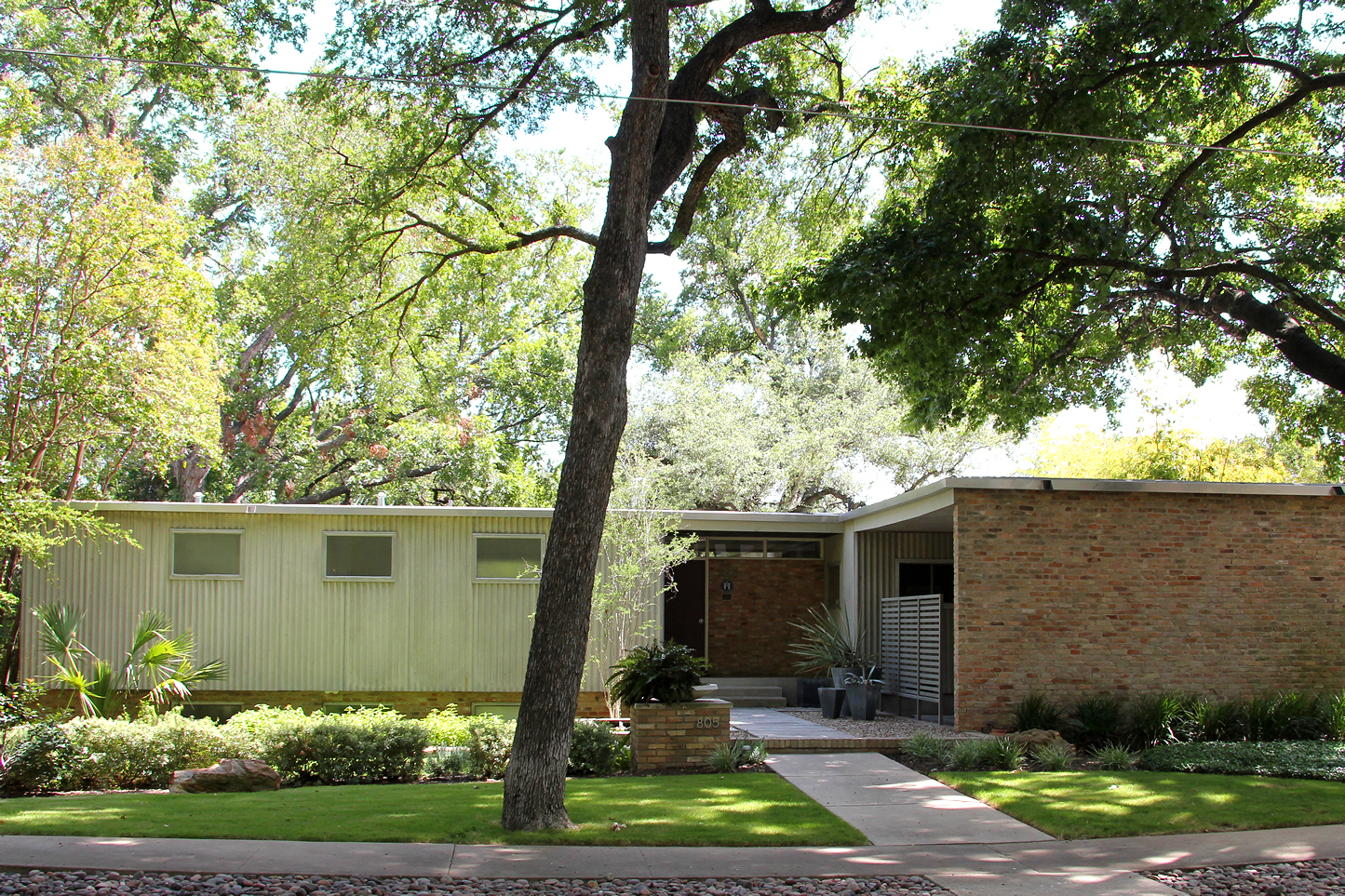
- The Granger House in 2011.

- Location within Texas Location within the United States
- Location: 805 West 16th Street; Austin, Texas
- Coordinates: 30°16′48″N 97°44′52″W
- Built: 1938
- Architect: Charles Thomson Granger
- Architectural style: International Style, Modern Movement, Ranch
- NRHP reference No.: 06001083
- RTHL No.: 16353

Significant dates
- Added to NRHP: November 29, 2006
- Designated RTHL: 2010

The Granger House and The Perch are a pair of historic homes in central Austin, Texas. The "Granger House" was built by local architect (and Austin native) Charles Granger in 1952, preceded by a smaller residence known as "The Perch" in 1945. Both buildings feature a distinctive boxy Mid-Century modern style, unique in the local neighborhood, that is today almost unaltered from their original appearance.

Granger was notable for starting the Fehr and Granger architectural firm, which produced many notable Austin buildings after World War II, including the award-winning Robert Mueller Municipal Airport.

Present owners Jeff Harper and Mark Seeger have undertaken a renovation of the buildings intent on preserving the mid-century style.

The homes are located at 805 West 16th Street. They were added to the National Register of Historic Places in 2006.
