= Blackfriars, Newcastle upon Tyne =

Grade I listed 13th-century friary in Newcastle-upon-Tyne

Blackfriars
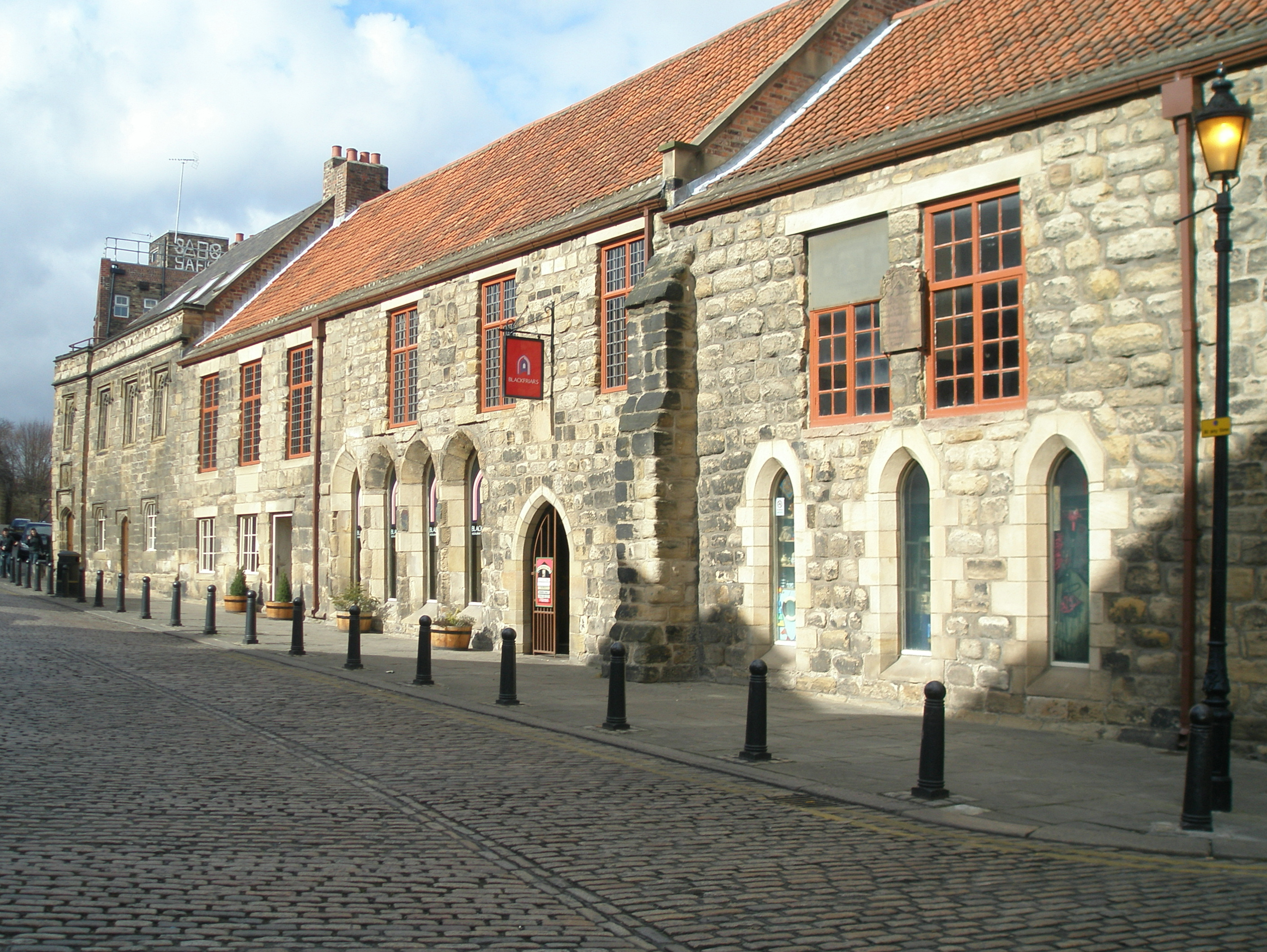
- Blackfriars

- Location within Newcastle-upon-Tyne
- 54°58′18″N 01°37′11″W

Site notes
- Architectural style: Medieval

Listed Building – Grade I
- Type: English Heritage
- Designated: 14 June 1954
- Reference no.: 1086979

Listed Building – Grade I
- Type: English Heritage
- Designated: 14 June 1954
- Reference no.: 1087001

Listed Building – Grade I
- Type: English Heritage
- Designated: 14 June 1954
- Reference no.: 1355267

Blackfriars is a restored Grade I listed 13th-century former priory in Newcastle upon Tyne, Tyne and Wear, England, located in the city centre, close to the city's Chinatown.

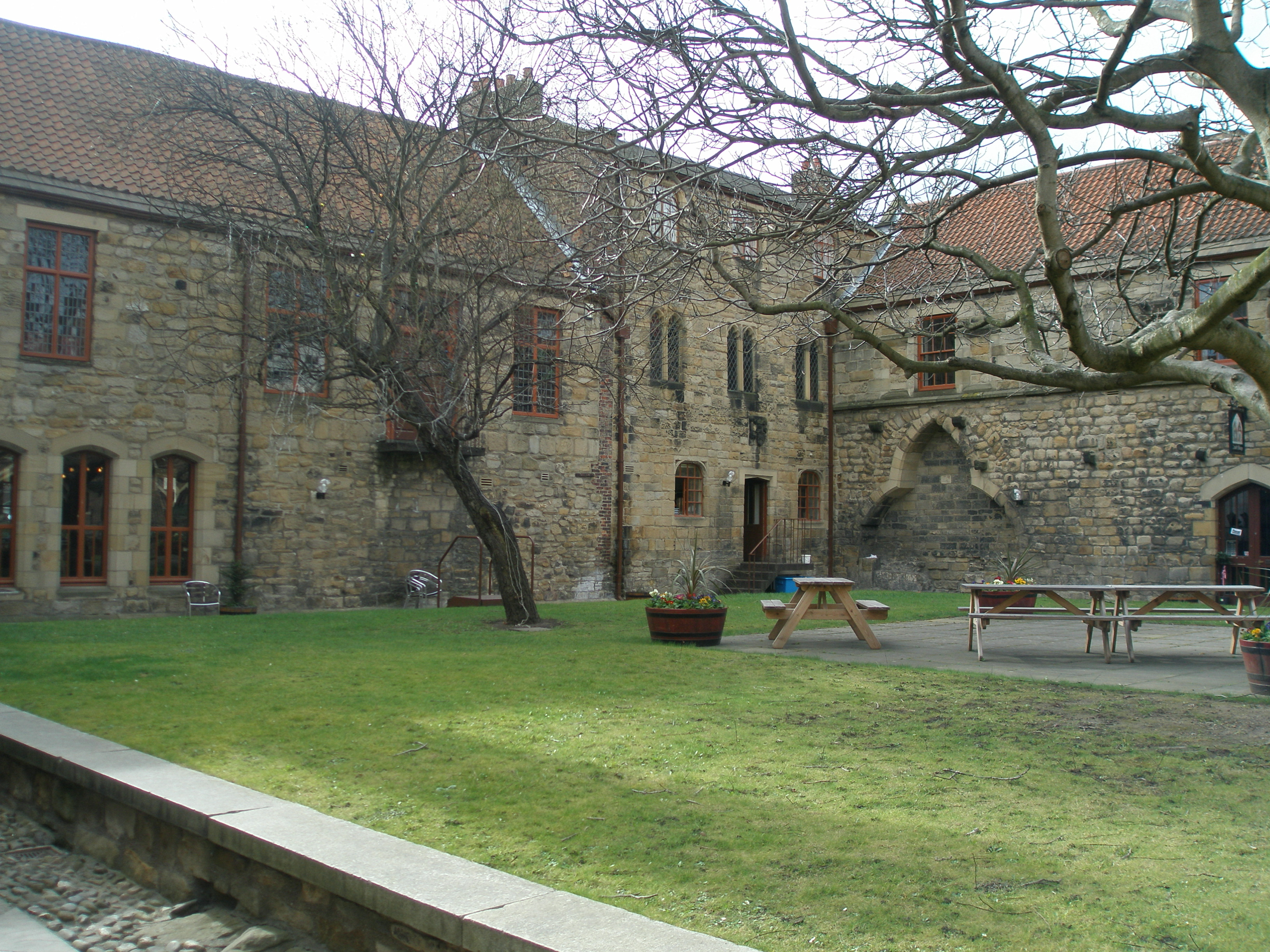
The cloisters area of Blackfriars

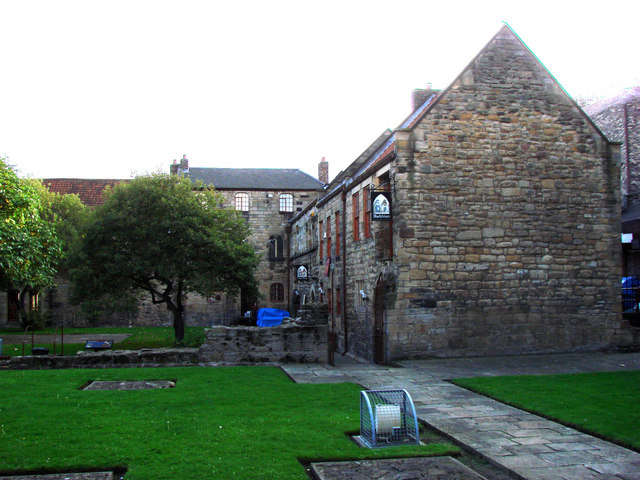
Blackfriars

== Early history ==
During the early years of the 13th century, orders of friars or mendicant brothers began to establish themselves in England. Newcastle upon Tyne came to have five mendicant communities within its walls: Blackfriars Priory (Dominican) established in 1239; Whitefriars Priory (Carmelite) established in 1262 (now Whitefriars Place); Austinfriars Priory (Augustinian) established in 1290 (now the site of the Holy Jesus Hospital); Greyfriars Friary (Franciscans) established in 1274 (now the site of New Place); and the Trinitarian Priory established in 1360. There was also the nunnery of St Bartholomew's founded in 1086 near the present Nun Street.

The Dominican priory was founded by a wealthy Newcastle merchant, Sir Peter Scott. Friars differed from monks in that liturgical worship was not the principle focus of their life. They were clerics who initially lived solely by begging, and they were mostly located in urban areas. The Dominican order was founded by St Dominic, also known as Dominic of Osma or Dominic de Gusman, shortly after 1200.

Dominicans were forbidden to own buildings and land, but such property could be held in trust for them. Such was the case with Blackfriars, which was situated in the north west of Newcastle upon Tyne just inside the city walls. The priory and its grounds covered seven acres (2.8 hectares), but also had two gardens and four small closes that provided a small income.

During the 14th century, the priory accommodated royalty on more than one occasion. In 1334 Edward III of England and Edward Balliol, the claimant to the Scottish throne, met there.

== Reformation ==
During the Reformation begun by Henry VIII in 1536, the five Newcastle mendicant communities and the nunnery were dissolved and the land was sold to the corporation and to rich merchants in 1539. The Church, sacristy, eastern half of the chapter house and cloister were all demolished. At this time there were fewer than 60 inmates of the religious houses in Newcastle. The convent of Blackfriars was sold to the Mayor and burgesses of Newcastle, who then leased it to nine of the town's craft guilds, to be used as their headquarters in 1552. This probably explains why it is the only one of the religious houses whose building survives to the present day.

The guilds carried out extensive changes to adapt the cloistered buildings to their own use. This was carried out in the late 16th and early 17th centuries. Between 1709 and 1739 many further alterations were made, such as providing new windows and altering floor levels. Some of the guilds, such as the Tailors and the Cordwainers, moved out of Blackfriars for a while and subsequently returned. The guilds' meeting houses in Blackfriars were well used until the 19th century. The guilds only met in them once a quarter, so that they were used for other purposes the rest of the time. Ground floor rooms often served as dwellings, either for people employed by the guilds, or for the needy, who lived there free of rent.

== Neglect and subsequent restoration ==
During much of the 19th century and into the 20th century, the buildings of Blackfriars were neglected and fell into an increasingly bad state of repair. In 1937 the Saddlers' property was declared as unfit for human habitation.

Newcastle Corporation acquired Blackfriars in the early 1950s. At one time there appeared to be a possibility that the Dominicans might return to occupy Blackfriars, but this did not happen. The guild of Tailors, among others, continued to meet at Blackfriars until 1974.

Between 1973 and 1981, the buildings of Blackfriars were restored.

== Blackfriars now ==
Only the buildings of the cloisters remain. In the Middle Ages the cloister consisted of an open garth, approximately 69 ft (21 m) square surrounded by a 10 ft (3.0 m) wide covered walk. The covered walk no longer exists. The priory church was at the north end of the cloister, but was demolished in the 16th century. The outline of the church can be made out in the grassy space that remains.

The buildings now house a range of craft workshops and a restaurant owned by Andy Hook with head chef Chris Wardale. Blackfriars also houses an exhibition, which describes the history of Blackfriars. The large grassed courtyard contrasts with the busy city life that surrounds it. The Tanners Guild still use the former Smiths Hall (referred to as the Freemen's Hall) in Blackfriars for their meetings.

The site is close to the most intact section of the medieval Newcastle town wall.

The Blackfriars (Order of Preachers) returned to Newcastle upon Tyne in the nineteenth century. St Dominic's Priory, the new Blackfriars, was opened by Cardinal Manning in 1873. It is situated on New Bridge Street. In 2020, the Dominicans left Newcastle, and the priory and church were handed to the Roman Catholic Diocese of Hexham and Newcastle.

== See also ==
- Holy Jesus Hospital
