= Granger House (Marion, Iowa) =

Historic house in Iowa, United States

- U.S. National Register of Historic Places
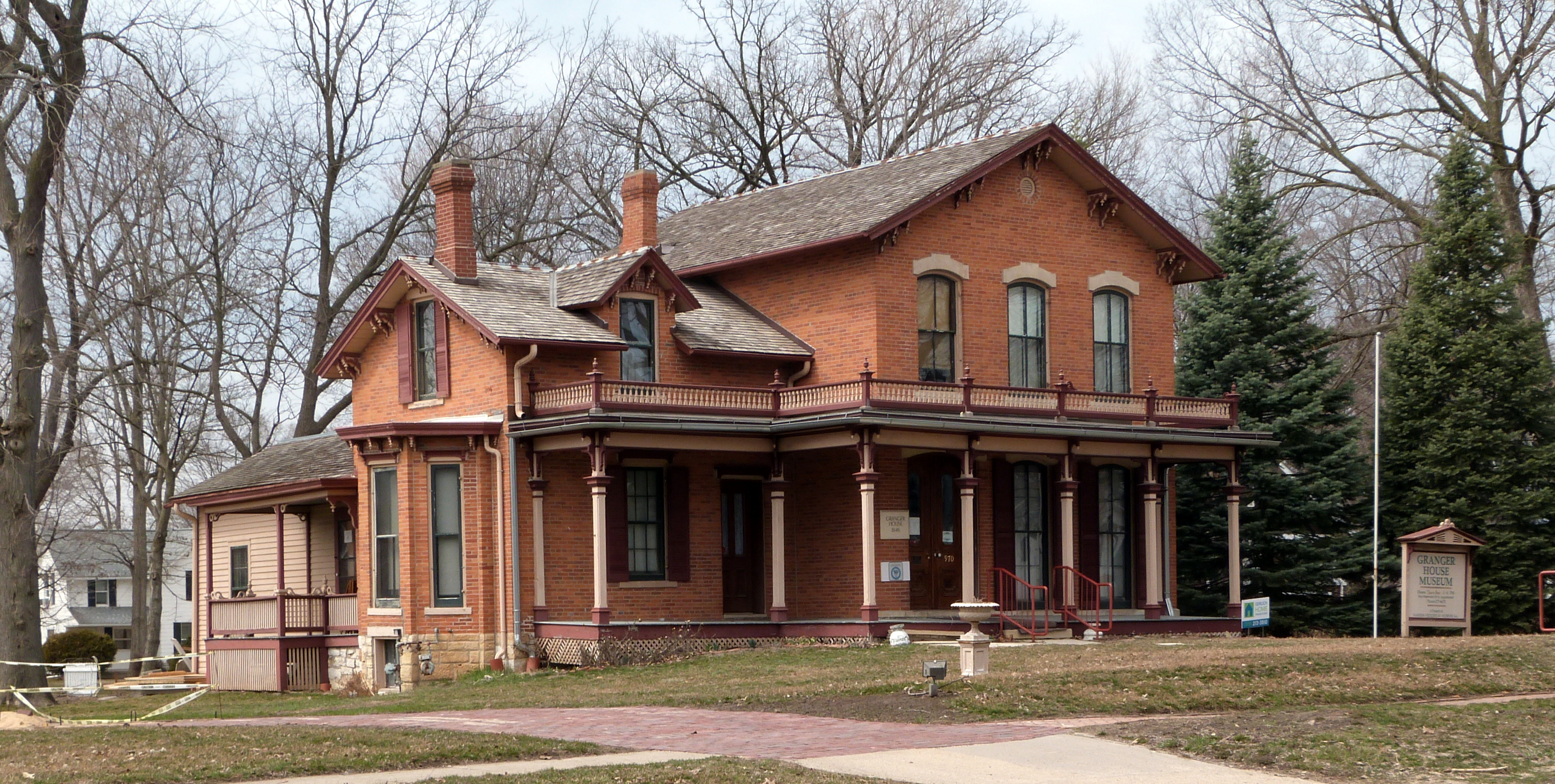

- Location within Iowa Location within the United States
- Location: 970 10th St. Marion, Iowa
- Coordinates: 42°02′09″N 91°35′59″W
- Area: less than one acre
- Built: 1860
- Built by: Charles Myers
- Architectural style: Italianate
- NRHP reference No.: 76000781
- Added to NRHP: August 13, 1976

The Granger House, also known as the Granger House Victorian Museum, is a historic heritage tourism site located in Marion, Iowa, United States. This Victorian Italianate house was built around 1860 by Charles Myers. Earl Granger bought the house in 1876 and it remained in his family until 1973. Granger built the carriage house in 1879, and built an addition onto the main house the following year, reflecting his growing wealth in livestock production and local banking investments. The two-story brick building features a 1 1/2-story ell, a gable roof, bracketed eaves, and arched stone lintels over the symmetrically arranged windows. The front porch is not the original. The house was listed on the National Register of Historic Places in 1976.
