= Granger (given name) =

Granger is a masculine given name which may refer to:

- Granger Boston (1921–1958), English cricketer
- Granger Cobb (1960–2015), American entrepreneur
- Granger K. Costikyan (1907–1998), American banker
- Granger Hall (basketball) (born 1962), American retired basketball player
- Granger Macfarlane (born 1929), American hotelier and politician
- Granger Smith (born 1979), American Southern Baptist minister and former country music singer and songwriter under the stage name Earl Dibbles Jr.
- Granger, a character in the multiplayer online battle arena game Mobile Legends: Bang Bang
