= St Edmund's Chapel, Tyne and Wear =

Church in Tyne and Wear, England

Coordinates: 54.9622°N 1.6001°W

St. Edmund's Chapel
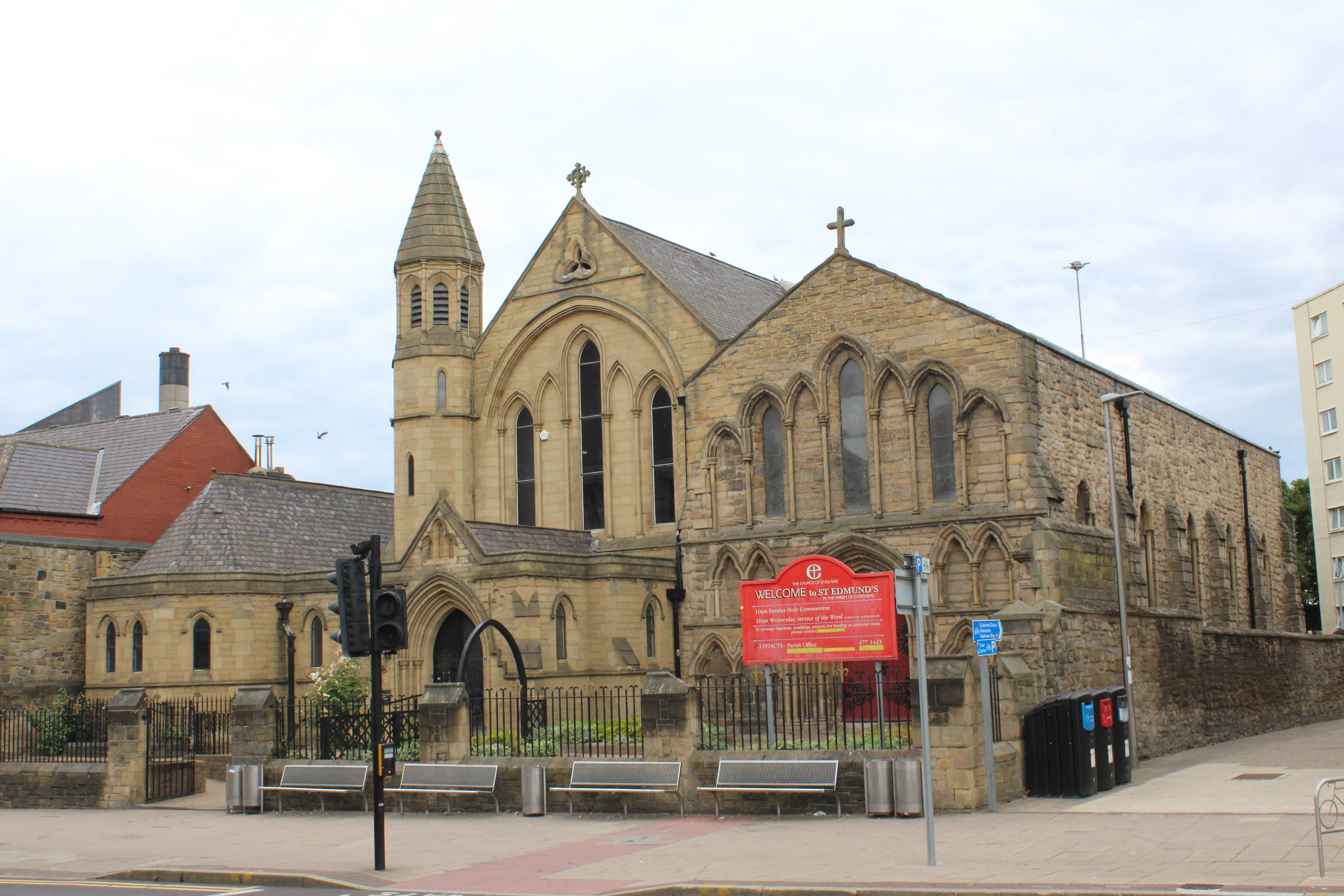
- Chapel of St Edmund's in 2018
- Interactive map of the St. Edmund's Chapel area

General information
- Type: Parish church
- Location: Gateshead, Tyne and Wear, England
- Completed: 13th century (original); 1837 (modern)
- Opened: c. 1200–1250

Design and construction
- Architect: John Dobson

Listed Building – Grade I
- Official name: Chapel of St Edmund and Trinity Centre
- Designated: 26 April 1950
- Reference no.: 1277874

St Edmund's Chapel is a Grade I listed parish church located on High Street, Gateshead, Tyne and Wear.

== Overview ==
Named for Edmund the Martyr, St Edmund's Chapel is a Church of England parish church for Gateshead located in the Diocese of Durham.

== History ==
St Edmund's Chapel was constructed between c. 1200 and 1250, and was established by Nicholas Farnham, Bishop of Durham. It was originally used as a pilgrim's hospital. Following the dissolution of the monasteries, it fell into disrepair. It was later repaired by John Dobson. From 1980, it was used as a parish church.

In 1950, St Edmund's Chapel and Trinity Centre became a Grade I listed building.
