= Granger High School =

Granger High School may refer to any of several high schools in the United States:

- Granger High School (Granger, Texas)
- Granger High School (Utah)
- Granger High School (Granger, Washington)

== See also ==
- Grainger High School, in Rutledge, Tennessee
