= Alderman Fenwick's House =

Historic building in England

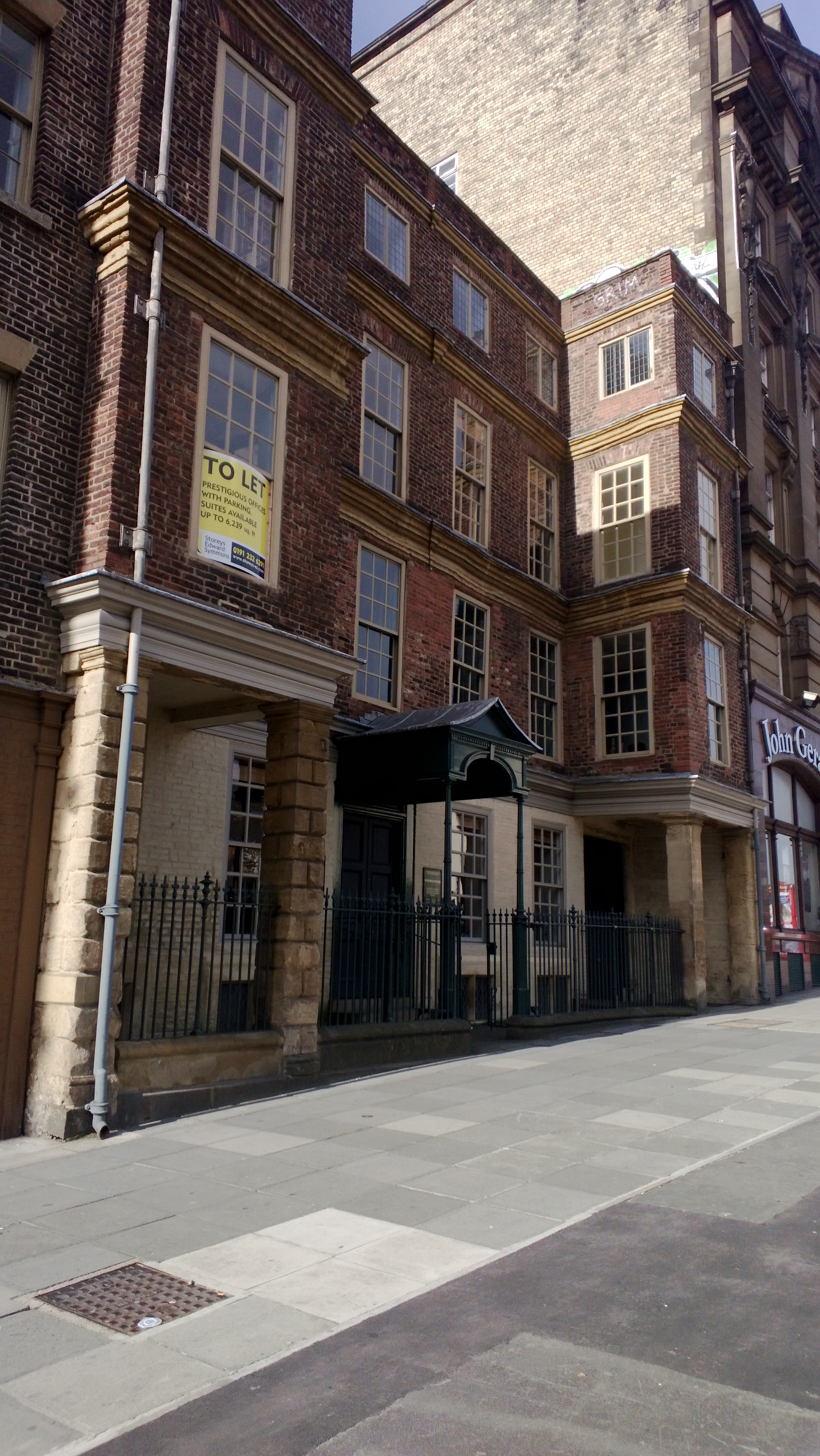
- (2013)

General information
- Type: House
- Architectural style: Georgian architecture
- Location: Pilgrim Street, Newcastle Upon Tyne, England
- Coordinates: 54.9718°N 1.6104°W
- Completed: 1670?
- Renovated: 1984–1997
- Owner: Central Space

Technical details
- Structural system: Brick

Alderman Fenwick's House is a grade one listed building of early Georgian appearance at 98–100 Pilgrim Street in Newcastle upon Tyne. As one of the few surviving merchant's houses it has both architectural and historic significance in the town.

== Location and construction ==
It is on the west side of the street, near the Swan House roundabout.

The building is mainly brick built, four stories high, with "closet wings" framing the front elevation. It is quite spacious – as well as the main floors there is a basement and attics. Horizontal sandstone bands mark each floor of the front wall. The roof is mainly pantile. An extensive restoration in the mid 1990s preserved the traditional appearance with sashed lattice windows and a porch.

Alderman Fenwick's House is one of only three significant brick built buildings of this age to survive in the locality (the others being the nearby Holy Jesus Hospital and The Keelmen's Hospital on City Road.

== History ==
Newcastle is noted for its elegant stone-faced streets in Grainger Town. Alderman Fenwick's House is about a hundred and sixty years older than these. It has been a survivor when much else was swept away.

Pilgrim Street was a significant south-facing entrance to Newcastle, up a steep hill from the River Tyne and the Quayside. ("The Side" and "Forth Banks" are others). The nature of the street has changed greatly over the centuries that Alderman Fenwick's house has stood. Gray's 'Chorographia' of 1649 described it as the 'longest and fairest street in the town'.

The original date for construction of Alderman Fenwick's house isn't known, but thought to be around 1670. According to some sources, in 1695 it was inherited by Sarah Winship, who had married the merchant Nicholas Fenwick. The Fenwicks were a large family in Northumberland. One branch owned Wallington Hall in Northumberland, and the extended family had numerous other properties at that time.

=== 18th century ===
Nicholas Fenwick improved the house around 1700. Pilgrim Street was then a desirable address as a townhouse for gentry. It was described as a "stylish residence – fit for an important family".

Nicholas remarried in 1716 to Elizabeth Clavering, which brought him an estate in Alnwick. Nicholas was mayor of Newcastle in 1720 as his father had been in 1708. He was mayor again in 1726. In 1727 he was Tory Parliamentary Candidate for Newcastle upon Tyne, serving until 1747. Nicholas Fenwick was a staunch opponent of Walpole's Excise Bill, which would have allowed Excise Men to search houses "on suspicion".

As the coal and metalwork trades developed, Newcastle became busier. Townhouses moved to newer locations like Charlotte Square (built 1770). The Fenwicks sold the house in 1753, a year after Nicholas died.

In 1781 the house was bought by Charles Turner and converted into the Queen's Head Inn. This coaching inn seems to have been a very successful business for over a century. Turner enlarged it to span the two buildings that still occupy the site today. Charles Dickens stayed at the Queen's Head when he visited Newcastle in 1850 to give performances of his works.

=== 19th century ===
Coaching inns declined when the railway network grew. Retail traffic moved to fashionable new developments like Grey Street and Grainger Street. The Royal Arcade aimed to revive this part of town but the Central Arcade outshone it. The area became a business district near Carliol Station.

Grey street was constructed in what had been the back gardens of the houses on Pilgrim Street in the 1830s. A few years later, in 1850, the High Level Bridge opened and the railway viaducts cut across the bottom end of the street. The new bridge meant a lot of traffic used St Nicolas Street and the Bigg Market instead of Pilgrim Street.

In 1883, the Newcastle upon Tyne Liberal Club leased the building. The Liberal party then represented the "industrial classes" and were a power on Tyneside. Winston Churchill (then a Liberal) attended the Club's Annual Luncheon in 1909.

The Conservative Club had premises further up Pilgrim Street, by then a business district more than a shopping street.

=== 20th century ===
Liberal fortunes went into decline with the rise of the Labour Party after the First World War. By 1962, the building was too large and the Liberals moved elsewhere.

In the 1930s, the Tyne Bridge was opened, redirecting the A1 London to Edinburgh road through Pilgrim Street. By the 1960s, traffic congestion caused the Central Motorway and Swan House roundabout to be built. Swan House is now part of the view from the frontage of Alderman Fenwick's house. To make way, the Royal Arcade which was opposite was demolished. In recent times traffic levels have fallen to just local activity. The Central Motorway running under Swan House has taken away the through-traffic. The A1 goes around the city to the West. This part of Newcastle now has a lot of hospitality businesses. Although the building had been a hotel for 100 years, it might be ill-suited to that now since alterations would conflict with the Grade one listed status.

The "Old Liberal Club", as it was then known, then stood empty for many years. Almost all of the area nearby was redeveloped. The east side of Pilgrim Street from Railway Lane down to the railway viaduct was demolished and replaced by Swan House – the roundabout, slip roads and subways leading to a plaza and fountains being designed as a celebration of 1960s architecture. Some of that has gone, the Swan House area has been redeveloped several times.

Alderman Fenwick's house remained empty and decaying. There were proposals to demolish and redevelop the building over the next decade. In 1974, Newcastle City Council bought the site, but no appropriate use for it was found.

== Preservation ==
Tyne and Wear Building Preservation Trust were set up in 1974. In 1984, they were invited to take on the building. It took another decade to arrange grants from the City Council and the Historic Buildings Council, so work on restoration completed in 1997.

Alderman Fenwick's house today is largely a restoration of former glory using appropriate materials. It is equipped as offices and was occupied for some time by a large employment agency. The site does have parking in Market Lane at the rear but the site is perhaps a bit tight for office staff and visitor parking.

In 2020, Central Space acquired the building, using it as a head office and as boutique offices and an events space.

== Bibliography ==
- Heslop, D.H.; McCombie, G. (1996). "Alderman Fenwick's House, A Late Seventeenth Century House in Pilgrim Street, Newcastle upon Tyne" (PDF). Archaeologia Aeliana. Series 5. 24: 129–169. doi:10.5284/1060977.
- Heslop, D.H.; Jobling, B.; McCombie, G. (2001). "Alderman Fenwick's House - The history of a seventeenth century house in Pilgrim Street, Newcastle upon Tyne, and its owners". Buildings of Newcastle (3). The Society of Antiquaries of Newcastle upon Tyne.
- Graham, Frank (1959). Old Inns and Taverns of Northumberland.
- Corbridge, James; Harris, J. (1723). Northumberland-Newcastle upon Tyne-1723 (Map). 1:1200.
