= Grainger Games =

Defunct video game retail chain

Grainger Games Limited

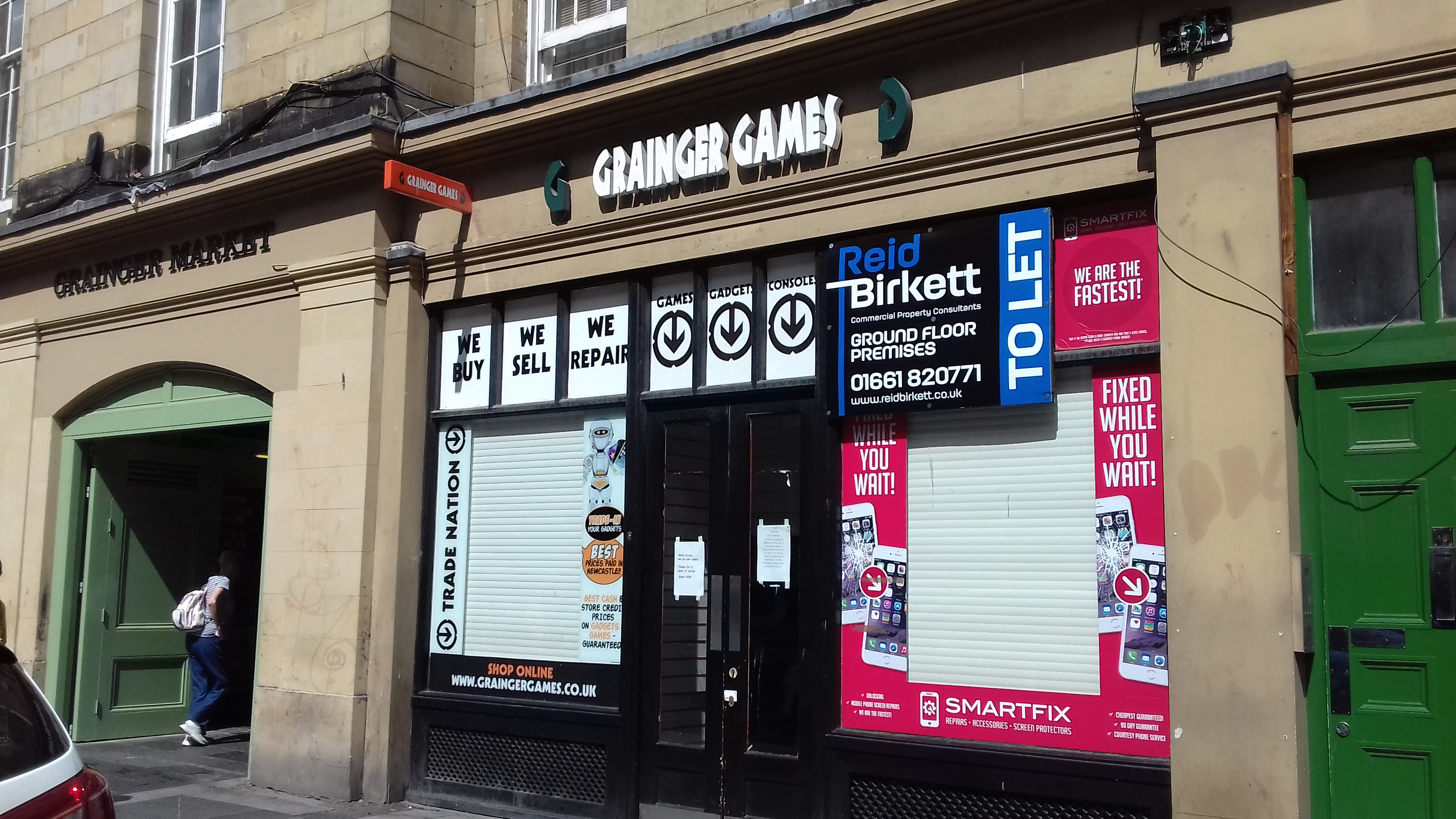
- Grainger Games, Market Street, Newcastle upon Tyne
- Company type: Private
- Industry: Retail
- Founded: 1996; 30 years ago
- Founder: Stephen Bowyer
- Defunct: 28 March 2018
- Fate: Dissolved
- Headquarters: Newcastle upon Tyne, England
- Number of locations: 67 stores (2018)
- Areas served: England (Northern); Scotland
- Key people: Stephen Bowyer (CEO); Keir Wells (COO); Jonathan Fellows (chairman)
- Number of employees: 400 (2018)

Grainger Games Limited was a British video game retail chain based in Newcastle upon Tyne, England. Founded by Stephen Bowyer in 1996, it operated shops across Northern England and Scotland. In March 2018, due to financial issues, the company ceased trading and closed all of its 67 shops, leading to the redundancy of 400 employees.

== History ==
Grainger Games began as a market stall run by Stephen Bowyer in 1996, located in the Grainger Market, Newcastle upon Tyne. The company planned to have a chain of between 75 and 100 shops by 2013, of which about 40 were expected to be in Yorkshire. Stores were opened in Grimsby, Hull, Chesterfield, Doncaster, Leeds, Derby, York and Sheffield, with the most recent being a concession in Fenwick, Newcastle.

By June 2014, the company had 419 employees. Grainger Games was named Independent Retailer of the Year by MCV in 2008 and 2010, respectively.

Grainger Games were the main sponsor for the Games Media Awards in 2011, however, its attendees were criticised for their behaviour during the event, which included heckling the compere and award winners' acceptance speeches. The company hired dwarves and booth models to present the awards, as well as littering the dinner tables with orange condoms.

On 21 March 2018, amid the closures of other retail chains, such as Toys "R" Us and Maplin, multiple investors pulled their credit offerings for Grainger Games, leaving the company in a financially critical situation. As a result of this, on 28 March, 21 of Grainger Games' 67 stores were told not to open as their store would not be included in any future bid for the company. The same message was delivered to the remaining 46 stores the following day. Additionally, the corporate website was taken down, displaying an HTTP 404 error page instead. All of Grainger Games' roughly 400 employees were made redundant, receiving payments for all working hours through to 31 March. The company ceased trading effective on 28 March 2018.
