= Grainger Market =

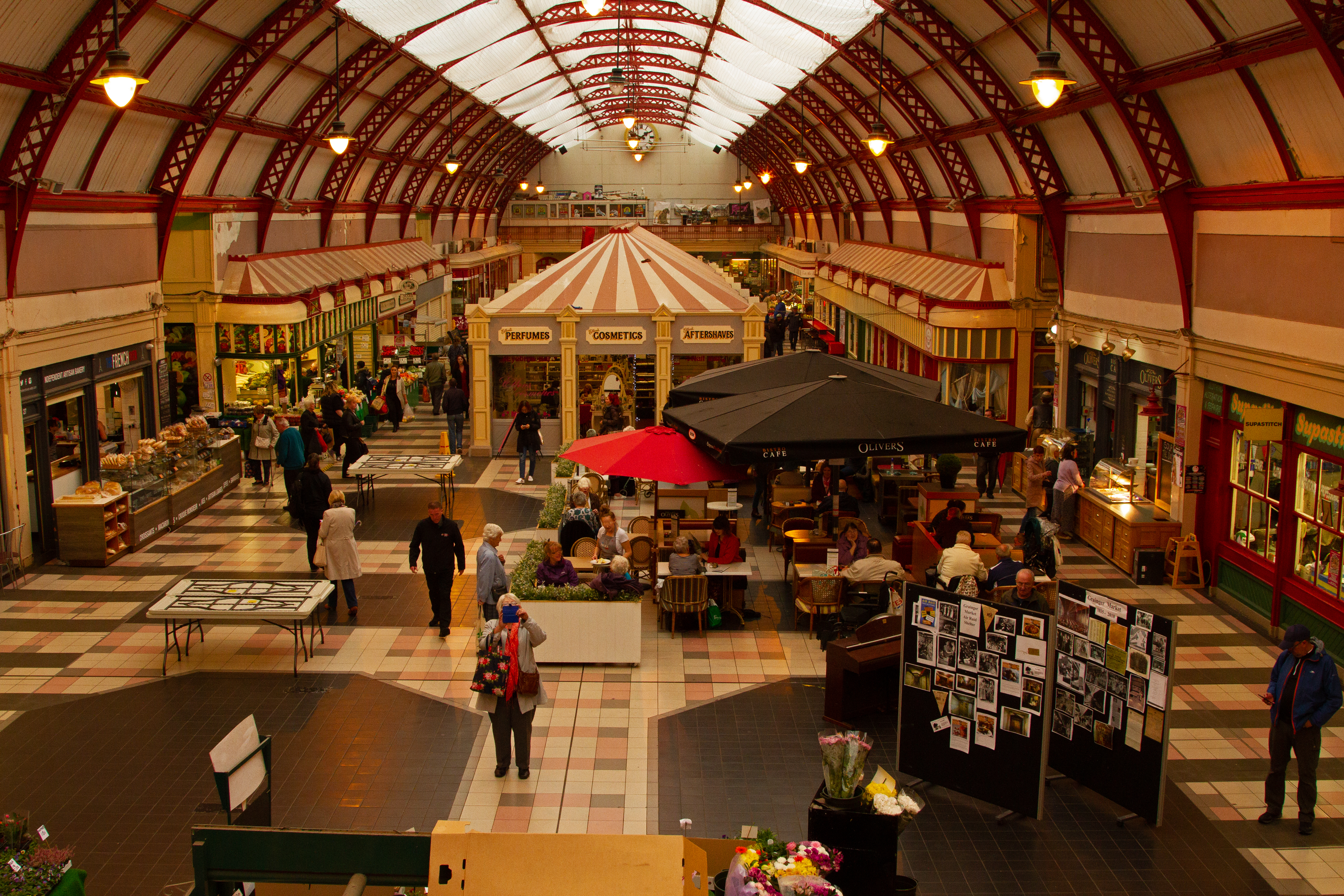
- Grainger Market in 2019

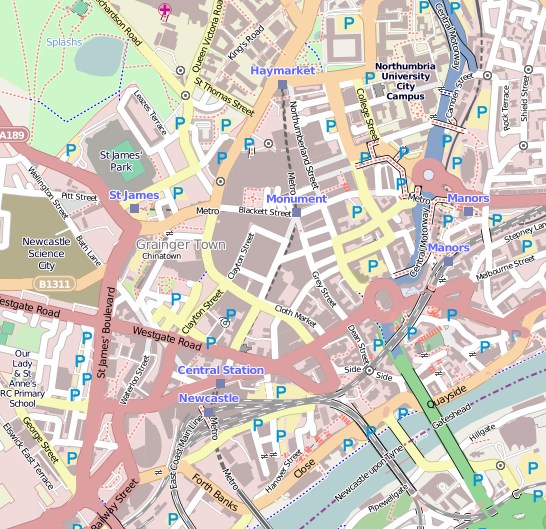
- Location within Newcastle upon Tyne

General information
- Location: Newcastle upon Tyne, England
- Coordinates: 54°58′22.08″N 1°36′53.68″W
- Completed: 24 October 1835
- Client: Richard Grainger

Design and construction
- Architect: John Dobson
- Designations

Listed Building – Grade I
- Designated: 14 June 1954
- Reference no.: 1024866

Website
- Official website

Grainger Market is a covered market in Newcastle upon Tyne. It opened in 1835 as part of the 19th-century Neoclassical redevelopment of the city, Grainger Town. Designed by architect John Dobson, the market replaced older markets that were demolished during the construction of Grey Street. The market is home to over 100 businesses. The Grade I listed market is situated in the heart of the Newcastle city centre, adjacent to Grainger street. The market originally consisted of two main sections: the Eastern section, which functioned as a meat market laid out in a series of aisles, and the Western section, a large open hall that served as the vegetable market.

The market is home to a small branch of Marks & Spencer, a market stall known as Marks and Spencer's Original Penny Bazaar, which opened in 1895.

== History ==
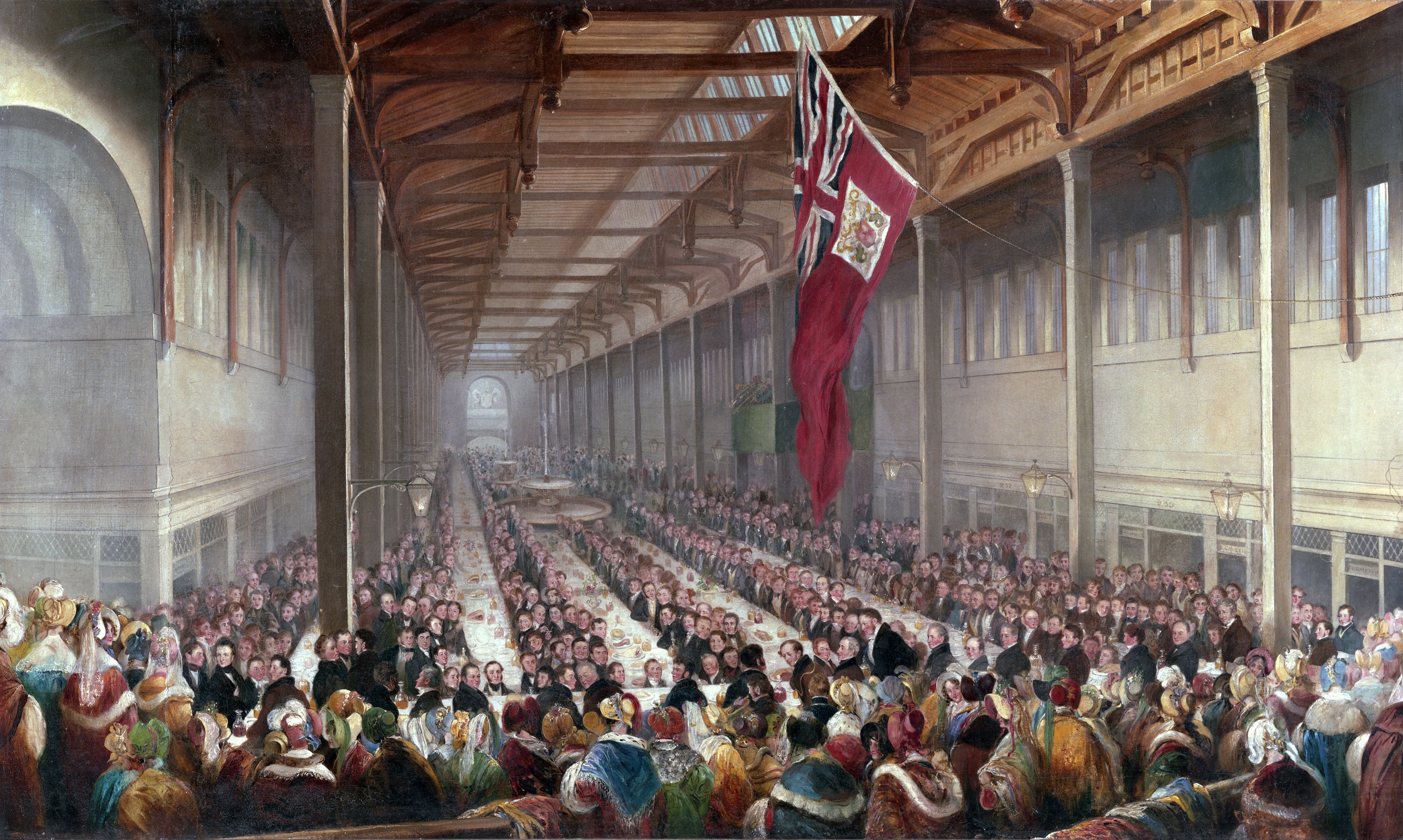
The Banquet at the opeing of Grainger Market

Grainger's plans for the redevelopment of Newcastle's centre involved the demolition of the existing Flesh Market. Grainger, therefore, offered to build a new meat market and vegetable market. In his contract with the Development Corporation, Grainger would pay £15,000 in compensation for the vegetable market, and the Corporation would pay £36,290 toward constructing a new one. The meat market was placed between two of the new streets, Grainger Street and Clayton Street, and the vegetable market was placed on the west side of Clayton Street. Both were designed by Dobson. The meat market four avenues each 338 feet (103 m) long had pilastered arcades, 360 windows, fanlights and wooden cornices, and . It contained 180 butchers' shops when it opened.

On 24 October 1835, to celebrate the opening of the markets, a grand dinner was held in the vegetable market, with 2,000 guests, and presided over by the mayor.

The vegetable market's foundations were made of local Kenton stone and were designed to resemble those of the Borghese Palace in Rome. The market was given an open-plan layout, 318 feet (97 m) long, 57 feet (17 m) wide and 40 feet (12 m) high, with a timber roof supported by iron pillars. Both markets, in total, formed a footprint of over two acres with 13,906 square yards (11,627 m^{2}) of retail space.

When opened, the Newcastle Journal said, "The New Markets, which are now finished, form at present the most attractive feature of Mr. Grainger's splendid improvements. They exceed two acres in area, [...] designed with a chaste and classic elegance, surpassing anything in street architecture hitherto witnessed in this neighbourhood."

The Grainger Arcade wooden-beamed roof burned down at the turn of the 20th century in 1901. In 1904, a new steel and glass roof was installed.

During World War II, air raid shelters were built under the market. In 2024, the poor condition of the shelters led to the council proposing to fill them with concrete, as part of a £9 million refurbishment of the market. The refurbishment, which began in September 2024, is expected to be complete by early 2026; it also includes roof repairs, two new pavilions in the arcade and new public toilets.

== See also ==
- Grainger Games
