= Granger Building =

Historic building in San Diego, California, U.S.

Granger Hotel Gaslamp Quarter
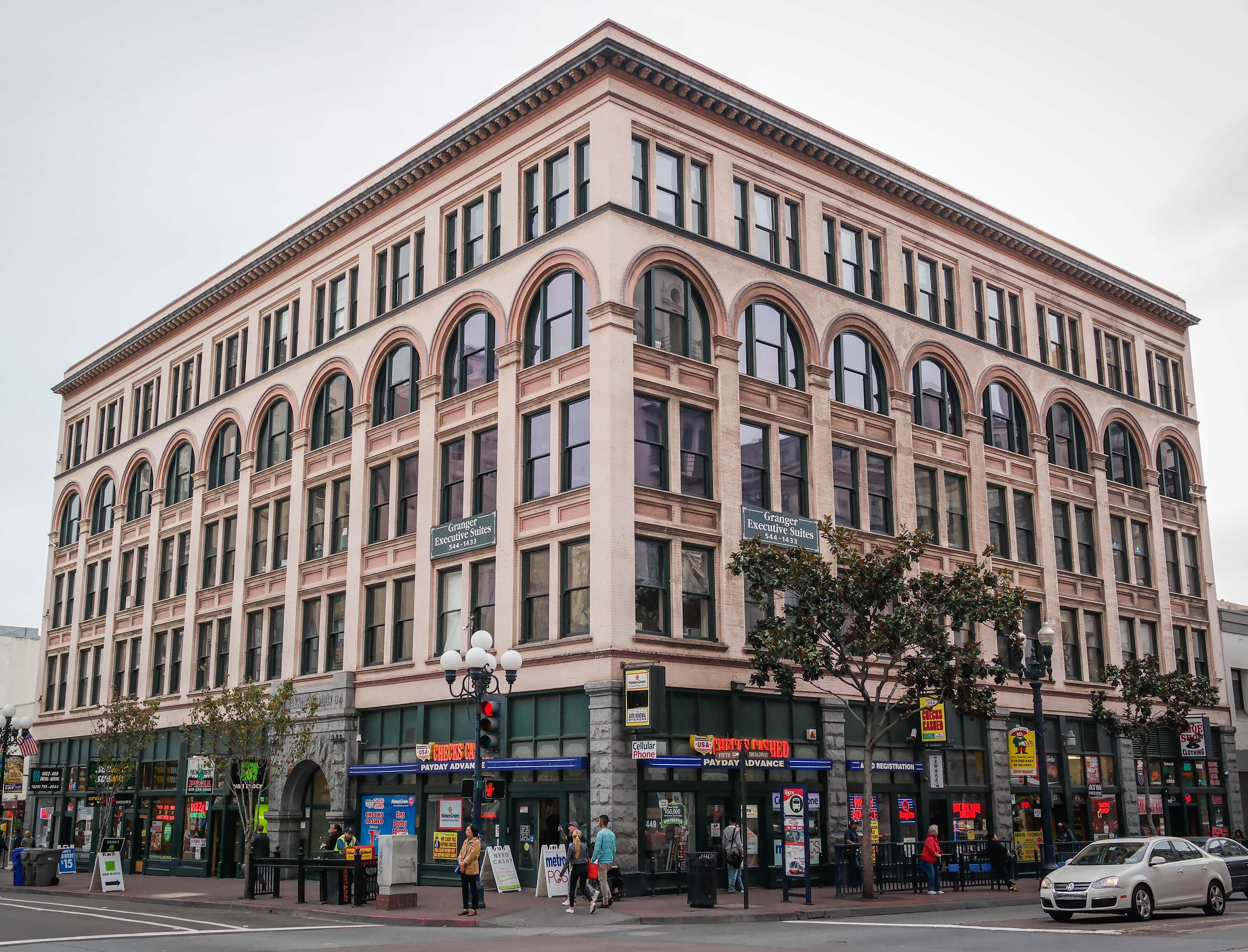
- The building in 2014
- Interactive map of the Granger Hotel Gaslamp Quarter area
- Former names: Granger Building
- Alternative names: Granger Block

General information
- Location: 964 5th Avenue, San Diego, United States
- Coordinates: 32.71548°N 117.16038°W
- Opened: 1904

The Granger Building is a historic structure located at 964 5th Avenue at Broadway in the Gaslamp Quarter, San Diego, in the U.S. state of California. It was built in 1904.

== History ==
Granger Building, designed in the Romanesque-style, opened in 1904. The building has housed numerous businesses over the years, including a bank, offices, and a hotel. The building also once housed animals for the San Diego Zoo.

== See also ==
- List of Gaslamp Quarter historic buildings
