= History of Newcastle upon Tyne =

Development of a city in North East England

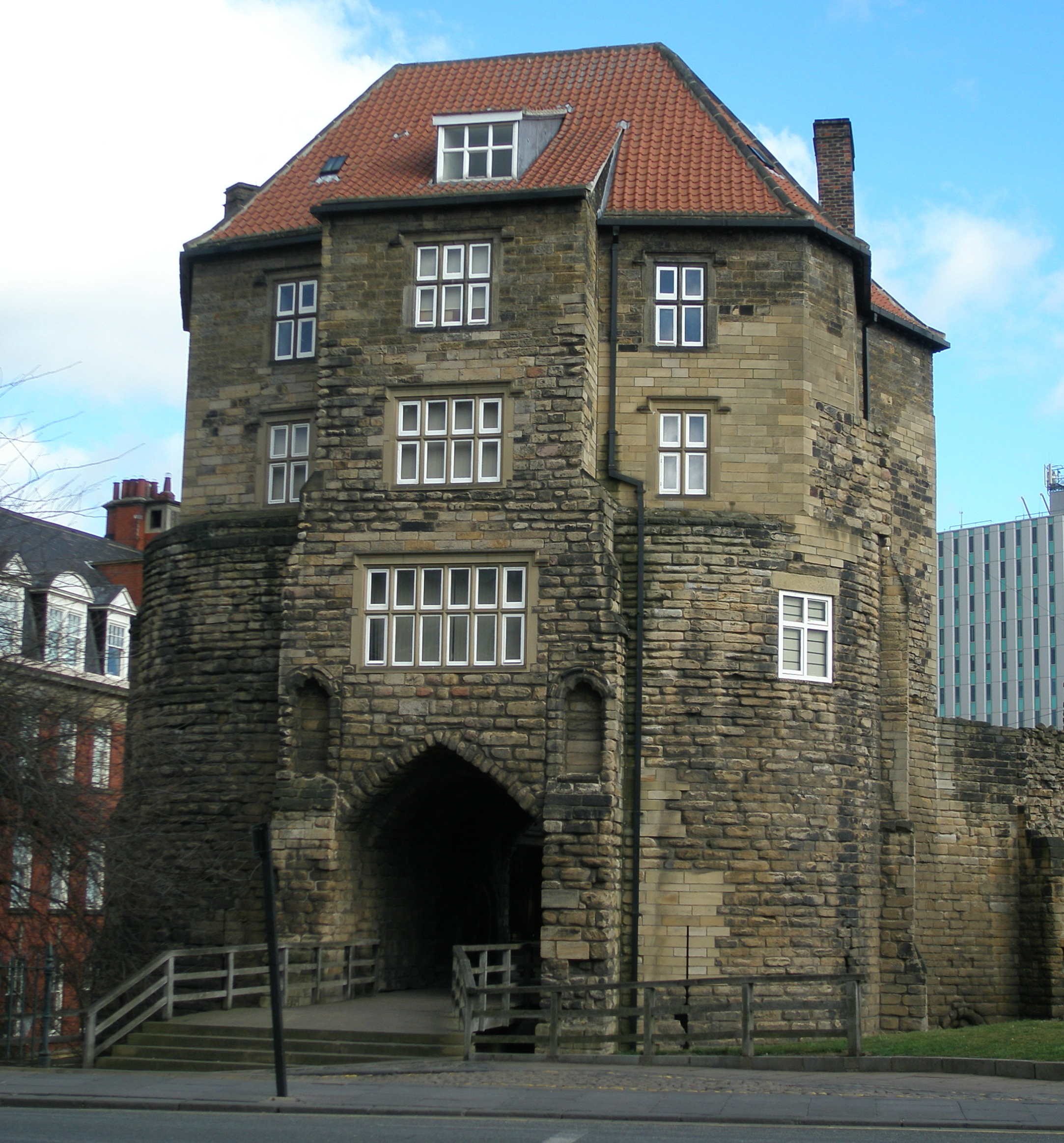
The Black Gate, part of Newcastle Castle.

The history of Newcastle upon Tyne dates back almost 2,000 years, during which it has been controlled by the Romans, the Angles and the Norsemen amongst others. Newcastle upon Tyne was originally known by its Roman name Pons Aelius. The name "Newcastle" has been used since the Norman Conquest of England. Due to its prime location on the River Tyne, the town developed greatly during the Middle Ages and it was to play a major role in the Industrial Revolution, being granted city status in 1882. Today, the city is a major retail, commercial and cultural centre.

== Roman settlement ==
The history of Newcastle dates from AD 122, when the Romans built the first bridge to cross the River Tyne at that point. The bridge was called Pons Aelius or 'Bridge of Aelius', Aelius being the family name of Roman Emperor Hadrian, who was responsible for the Roman wall built across northern England along the Tyne–Solway gap. Hadrian's Wall ran through present-day Newcastle, with stretches of wall and turrets visible along the West Road, and at a temple in Benwell. Traces of a milecastle were found on Westgate Road, midway between Clayton Street and Grainger Street, and it is likely that the course of the wall corresponded to present-day Westgate Road. The course of the wall can be traced eastwards to the Segedunum Roman fort at Wallsend, with the fort of Arbeia down-river at the mouth of the Tyne, on the south bank in what is now South Shields. The Tyne was then a wider, shallower river at this point and it is thought that the bridge was probably about 700 feet (210 m) long, made of wood and supported on stone piers. It is probable that it was sited near the current Swing Bridge, due to the fact that Roman artefacts were found there during the building of the latter bridge. Hadrian himself probably visited the site in 122. A shrine was set up on the completed bridge in 123 by the 6th Legion, with two altars to Neptune and Oceanus respectively. The two altars were subsequently found in the river and are on display in the Great North Museum in Newcastle.

The Romans built a stone-walled fort in 150 to protect the river crossing which was at the foot of the Tyne Gorge, and this took the name of the bridge so that the whole settlement was known as Pons Aelius. The fort was situated on a rocky outcrop overlooking the new bridge, on the site of the present Castle Keep. Pons Aelius is last mentioned in 400, in a Roman document listing all of the Roman military outposts. It is likely that nestling in the shadow of the fort would have been a small vicus, or village. Unfortunately, no buildings have been detected; only a few pieces of flagging. It is clear that there was a Roman cemetery near Clavering Place, behind the Central station, as a number of Roman coffins and sarcophagi have been unearthed there.

Despite the presence of the bridge, the settlement of Pons Aelius was not particularly important among the northern Roman settlements. The most important stations were those on the highway of Dere Street running from Eboracum (York) through Corstopitum (Corbridge) and to the lands north of the Wall. Corstopitum, being a major arsenal and supply centre, is thought to have been much larger and more populous than Pons Aelius.

== Anglo-Saxon development ==
The Angles arrived in the North-East of England in about 500 and may have landed on the Tyne. There is no evidence of an Anglo-Saxon settlement on or near the site of Pons Aelius during the Anglo-Saxon age. The bridge probably survived and there may well have been a small village at the northern end, but no evidence survives. At that time the region was dominated by two kingdoms, Bernicia, north of the Tees and ruled from Bamburgh, and Deira, south of the Tees and ruled from York. Bernicia and Deira combined to form the kingdom of Northanhymbra (Northumbria) early in the 7th century. There were three local kings who held the title of Bretwalda – 'Lord of Britain', Edwin of Deira (627–632), Oswald of Bernicia (633–641) and Oswy of Northumbria (641–658). The 7th century became known as the 'Golden Age of Northumbria', when the area was a beacon of culture and learning in Europe. The greatness of this period was based on its generally Christian culture and resulted in the Lindisfarne Gospels amongst other treasures. The Tyne valley was dotted with monasteries, with those at Monkwearmouth, Hexham and Jarrow being the most famous. Bede, who was based at Jarrow, wrote of a royal estate, known as Ad Murum, 'at the Wall', 12 miles (19 km) from the sea. It is thought that this estate may have been in what is now Newcastle. At some unknown time, the site of Newcastle came to be known as Monkchester. The reason for this title is unknown, as we are unaware of any specific monasteries at the site, and Bede made no reference to it. In 875 Halfdan Ragnarsson, the Danish Viking conqueror of York, led an army that attacked and pillaged various monasteries in the area, and it is thought that Monkchester was also pillaged at this time. Little more was heard of it until the coming of the Normans.

== Norman period ==
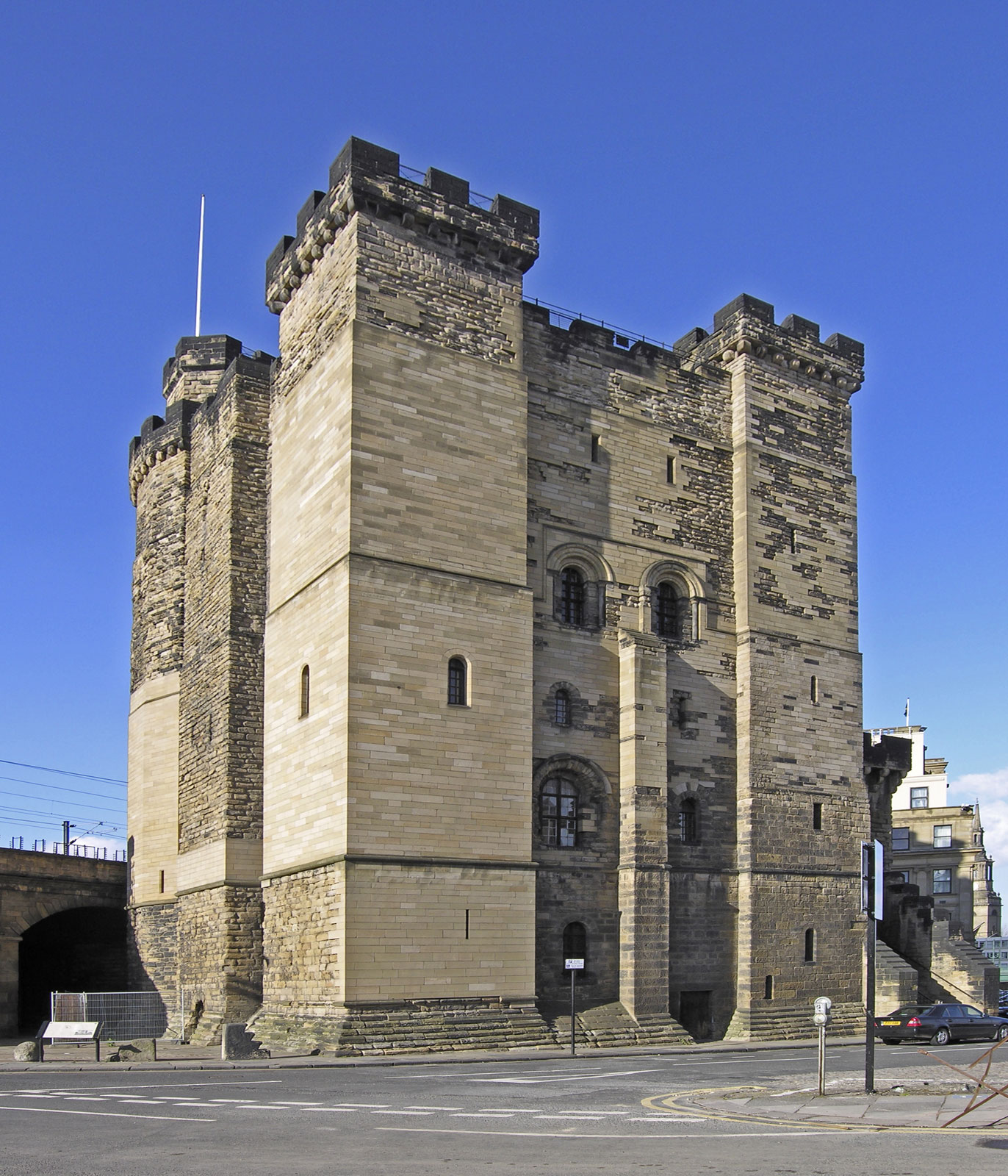
The Castle Keep

After the arrival of William the Conqueror in England in 1066, the whole of England was quickly subjected to Norman rule. However, in Northumbria there was great resistance to the Normans, and in 1069 the newly appointed Norman Earl of Northumbria, Robert de Comines and 700 of his men were killed by the local population at Durham. The Northumbrians then marched on York, but William was able to suppress the uprising. That same year, a second uprising occurred when a Danish fleet landed in the Humber. The Northumbrians again attacked York and destroyed the garrison there. William was again able to suppress the uprising, but this time he took revenge. He laid waste to the whole of the Midlands and the land from York to the Tees. In 1080, Walcher, the Norman bishop of Durham and his followers were brutally murdered at Gateshead. This time Odo, bishop of Bayeux, William's half brother, devastated the land between the Tees and the Tweed. This was known as the 'Harrying of the North'. This devastation is reflected in the Domesday Book. The destruction had such an effect that the North remained poor and backward at least until Tudor times and perhaps until the Industrial Revolution. Newcastle suffered in this respect with the rest of the North.

In 1080 William sent his eldest son, Robert Curthose, north to defend the kingdom against the Scots. After his campaign, he moved to Monkchester and began the building of a 'New Castle'. This was of the "motte-and-bailey" type of construction, a wooden tower on top of an earthen mound (motte), surrounded by a moat and wooden stockade (bailey). It was this castle that gave Newcastle its name. In 1095 the Earl of Northumbria, Robert de Mowbray, rose up against the king, William Rufus, and Rufus sent an army north to recapture the castle. From then on the castle became crown property and was an important base from which the king could control the northern barons. The Northumbrian earldom was abolished and a Sheriff of Northumberland was appointed to administer the region. In 1091 the parish church of St Nicholas was consecrated on the site of the present Anglican cathedral, close by the bailey of the new castle. The church is believed to have been a wooden building on stone footings.

Not a trace of the tower or mound of the motte and bailey castle remains now. Henry II replaced it with a rectangular stone keep, which was built between 1172 and 1177 at a cost of £1,444. A stone bailey, in the form of a triangle, replaced the previous wooden one. The great outer gateway to the castle, called 'the Black Gate', was built later, between 1247 and 1250, in the reign of Henry III. There were at that time no town walls and when attacked by the Scots, the townspeople had to crowd into the bailey for safety. It is probable that the new castle acted as a magnet for local merchants because of the safety it provided. This in turn would help to expand trade in the town. At this time wool, skins and lead were being exported, whilst alum, pepper and ginger were being imported from France and Flanders.

== Middle Ages ==
Throughout the Middle Ages, Newcastle was England's northern fortress, the centre for assembled armies. The Border war against Scotland lasted intermittently for several centuries – possibly the longest border war ever waged. During the civil war between Stephen and Matilda, David 1st of Scotland and his son were granted Cumbria and Northumberland respectively, so that for a period from 1139 to 1157, Newcastle was effectively in Scottish hands. It is believed that during this period, King David may have built the church of St Andrew and the Benedictine nunnery in Newcastle. However, King Stephen's successor, Henry II was strong enough to take back the Earldom of Northumbria from Malcolm IV.

The Scots king William the Lion was imprisoned in Newcastle, in 1174, after being captured at the Battle of Alnwick. Edward I brought the Stone of Scone and William Wallace south through the town and Newcastle was successfully defended against the Scots three times during the 14th century.

Around 1200, stone-faced, clay-filled jetties were starting to project into the river, an indication that trade was increasing in Newcastle. As the Roman roads continued to deteriorate, sea travel was gaining in importance. By 1275 Newcastle was the sixth largest wool exporting port in England. The principal exports at this time were wool, timber, coal, millstones, dairy produce, fish, salt and hides. Much of the developing trade was with the Baltic countries and Germany. Most of the Newcastle merchants were situated near the river, below the Castle. The earliest known charter was dated 1175 in the reign of Henry II, giving the townspeople some control over their town. In 1216 King John granted Newcastle a mayor and also allowed the formation of guilds (known as Mysteries). These were cartels formed within different trades, which restricted trade to guild members. There were initially twelve guilds. Coal was being exported from Newcastle by 1250, and by 1350 the burgesses received a royal licence to export coal. This licence to export coal was jealously guarded by the Newcastle burgesses, and they tried to prevent any one else on the Tyne from exporting coal except through Newcastle. The burgesses similarly tried to prevent fish from being sold anywhere else on the Tyne except Newcastle. This led to conflicts with Gateshead and South Shields.

In 1265, the town was granted permission to impose a 'Wall Tax' or Murage, to pay for the construction of a fortified wall to enclose the town and protect it from Scottish invaders. The town walls were not completed until early in the 14th century. They were two miles (3 km) long, 9 feet (2.7 m) thick and 25 feet (7.6 m) high. They had six main gates, as well as some smaller gates, and had 17 towers. The land within the walls was divided almost equally by the Lort Burn, which flowed southwards and joined the Tyne to the east of the Castle. The town began to expand north of the Castle and west of the Lort Burn with various markets being set up within the walls.

In 1400 Henry IV granted a new charter, creating a County corporate which separated the town, but not the Castle, from the county of Northumberland and recognised it as a "county of itself" with a right to have a sheriff of its own. The burgesses were now allowed to choose six aldermen who, with the mayor would be justices of the peace. The mayor and sheriff were allowed to hold borough courts in the Guildhall.

=== Religious houses ===
During the Middle Ages, a number of religious houses were established within the walls: the first of these was the Benedictine nunnery of St Bartholomew founded in 1086 near the present-day Nun Street. Both David I of Scotland and Henry I of England were benefactors of the religious house. Nothing of the nunnery remains now.

The friary of Blackfriars, Newcastle (Dominican) was established in 1239. These were also known as the Preaching Friars or Shod Friars, because they wore sandals, as opposed to other orders. The friary was situated in the present-day Friars Street. In 1280 the order was granted royal permission to make a postern in the town walls to communicate with their gardens outside the walls. On 19 June 1334, Edward Balliol, claimant to be King of Scotland, did homage to King Edward III, on behalf of the kingdom of Scotland, in the church of the friary. Much of the original buildings of the friary still exist, mainly because, after the dissolution of the monasteries the friary of Blackfriars was rented out by the corporation to nine of the local trade guilds.

The friary of Whitefriars (Carmelite) was established in 1262. The order was originally housed on the Wall Knoll in Pandon, but in 1307 it took over the buildings of another order, which went out of existence, the Friars of the Sac. The land, which had originally been given by Robert the Bruce, was situated in the present-day Hanover Square, behind the Central station. Nothing of the friary remains now.

The friary of Austinfriars (Augustinian) was established in 1290. The friary was on the site where the Holy Jesus Hospital was built in 1682. The friary was traditionally the lodging place of English kings whenever they visited or passed through Newcastle. In 1503 Princess Margaret, eldest daughter of Henry VII of England, stayed two days at the friary on her way to join her new husband James IV of Scotland.

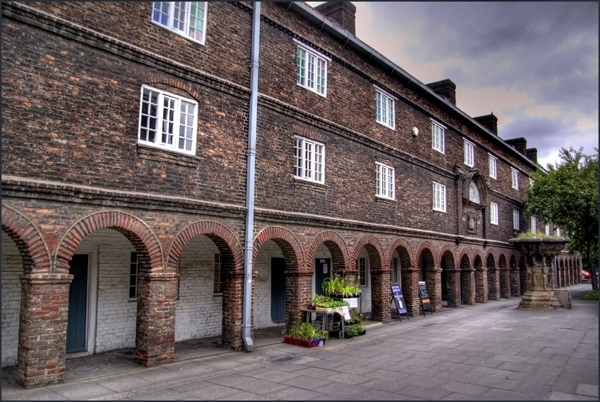
Front of the Holy Jesus Hospital

The friary of Greyfriars (Franciscans) was established in 1274. The friary was in the present-day area between Pilgrim Street, Grey Street, Market Street and High Chare. Nothing of the original buildings remains.

The friary of the Order of the Holy Trinity, also known as the Trinitarians, was established in 1360. The order devoted a third of its income to buying back captives of the Saracens, during the Crusades. Their house was on the Wall Knoll, in Pandon, to the east of the city, but within the walls. Wall Knoll had previously been occupied by the White Friars until they moved to new premises in 1307.

All of the above religious houses were closed in about 1540, when Henry VIII dissolved the monasteries.

An important street running through Newcastle at the time was Pilgrim Street, running northwards inside the walls and leading to the Pilgrim Gate on the north wall. The street still exists today as arguably Newcastle's main shopping street.

== Tudor period ==
The Scottish border wars continued for much of the 16th century, so that during that time, Newcastle was often threatened with invasion by the Scots, but also remained important as a border stronghold against them.

During the Reformation begun by Henry VIII in 1536, the five Newcastle friaries and the single nunnery were dissolved and the land was sold to the corporation and rich merchants. At this time there were fewer than 60 inmates of the religious houses in Newcastle. The convent of Blackfriars was leased to nine craft guilds to be used as their headquarters. This probably explains why it is the only one of the religious houses whose building survives to the present day. The priories at Tynemouth and Durham were also dissolved, thus ending the long-running rivalry between Newcastle and the church for control of trade on the Tyne. A little later, the property of the nunnery of St Bartholomew and of Grey Friars were bought by Robert Anderson, who had the buildings demolished to build his grand Newe House (also known as Anderson Place).

With the gradual decline of the Scottish border wars the town walls were allowed to decline as well as the castle. By 1547, about 10,000 people were living in Newcastle. At the beginning of the 16th century exports of wool from Newcastle were more than twice the value of exports of coal, but during the century coal exports continued to increase.

Under Edward VI, John Dudley, Duke of Northumberland, sponsored an act allowing Newcastle to annexe Gateshead as its suburb. The main reason for this was to allow the Newcastle Hostmen, who controlled the export of Tyne coal, to get their hands on the Gateshead coal mines, previously controlled by the Bishop of Durham. However, when Mary I came to power, Dudley met his downfall and the decision was reversed. The Reformation allowed private access to coal mines previously owned by Tynemouth and Durham priories and as a result coal exports increase dramatically, from 15,000 tons in 1500 to 35,000 tons in 1565, and to 400,000 tons in 1625.

The plague visited Newcastle four times during the 16th century, in 1579 when 2,000 people died, in 1589 when 1700 died, in 1595 and finally in 1597.

In 1600 Elizabeth I granted Newcastle a charter for an exclusive body of electors, the right to elect the mayor and burgesses. The charter also gave the Hostmen exclusive rights to load coal at any point on the Tyne. The Hostmen developed as an exclusive group within the Merchant Adventurers who had been incorporated by a charter in 1547.

== Stuart period ==
In 1636 there was a serious outbreak of bubonic plague in Newcastle. There had been several previous outbreaks of the disease over the years, but this was the most serious. It is thought to have arrived from the Netherlands via ships that were trading between the Tyne and that country. It first appeared in the lower part of the town near the docks but gradually spread to all parts of the town. As the disease gained hold the authorities took measures to control it by boarding up any properties that contained infected persons, meaning that whole families were locked up together with the infected family members. Other infected persons were put in huts outside the town walls and left to die. Plague pits were dug next to the town's four churches and outside the town walls to receive the bodies in mass burials. Over the course of the outbreak 5,631 deaths were recorded out of an estimated population of 12,000, a death rate of 47%.

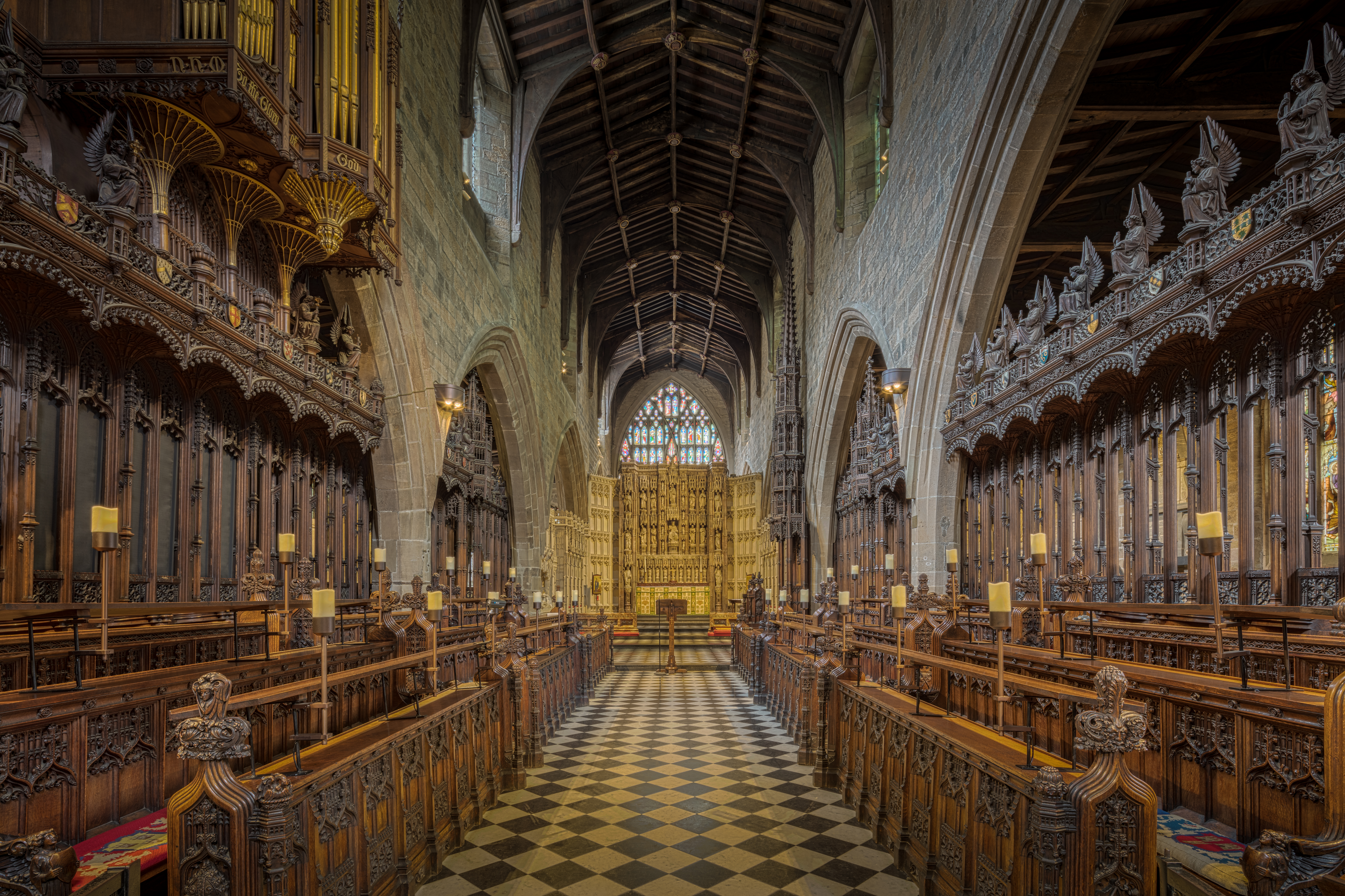
Chancel of Newcastle Cathedral

In 1637 Charles I tried to raise money by doubling the 'voluntary' tax on coal in return for allowing the Newcastle Hostmen to regulate production and fix prices. This caused outrage amongst the London importers and the East Anglian shippers. Both groups decided to boycott Tyne coal and as a result forced Charles to reverse his decision in 1638.

In 1640 during the Second Bishops' War, the Scots successfully invaded Newcastle. The occupying army demanded £850 per day from the corporation to billet the Scottish troops. Trade from the Tyne ground to a halt during the occupation. The Scots left in 1641 after receiving a Parliamentary pardon and a £4,000,000 loan from the town.

In 1642 the English Civil War began. King Charles realised the value of the Tyne coal trade and therefore garrisoned Newcastle. A Royalist was appointed as governor. At that time, Newcastle and King's Lynn were the only important seaports to support the crown. In 1644 Parliament blockaded the Tyne to prevent the king from receiving revenue from the Tyne coal trade. Coal exports fell from 450,000 to 3,000 tons and London suffered a hard winter without fuel. Parliament encouraged the coal trade from the Wear to try to replace that lost from Newcastle but that was not enough to make up for the lost Tyneside tonnage.

In 1644 the Scots crossed the border. Newcastle strengthened its defences in preparation. The Scottish army, with 40,000 troops, besieged Newcastle for three months until the garrison of 1,500 surrendered. During the siege, the Scots bombarded the walls with their artillery, situated in Gateshead and Castle Leazes. The Scottish commander threatened to destroy the steeple of St Nicholas's Church by gunfire if the mayor, Sir John Marley, did not surrender the town. The mayor responded by placing Scottish prisoners that they had captured in the steeple, so saving it from destruction. The town walls were finally breached by a combination of artillery and sapping. In gratitude for this defence, Charles gave Newcastle the motto 'Fortiter Defendit Triumphans' to be added to its coat of arms. The Scottish army occupied Northumberland and Durham for two years. The coal taxes had to pay for the Scottish occupation. In 1645 Charles surrendered to the Scots and was imprisoned in Newcastle for nine months. After the Civil War the coal trade on the Tyne soon picked up and exceeded its pre-war levels.

A new Guildhall was completed on the Sandhill next to the river in 1655, replacing an earlier facility damaged by fire in 1639, and became the meeting place of Newcastle Town Council. In 1681 the Hospital of the Holy Jesus was built partly on the site of the Austin Friars. The Guildhall and Holy Jesus Hospital still exist.

Charles II tried to impose a charter on Newcastle to give the king the right to appoint the mayor, sheriff, recorder and town clerk. Charles died before the charter came into effect. In 1685, James II tried to replace Corporation members with named Catholics. However, James' mandate was suspended in 1689 after the Glorious Revolution welcoming William of Orange. In 1689, after the fall of James II, the people of Newcastle tore down his bronze equestrian statue in Sandhill and tossed it into the Tyne. The bronze was later used to make bells for All Saints Church.

In 1689 the Lort Burn was covered over. At this time it was an open sewer. The channel followed by the Lort Burn became the present day Dean Street. At that time, the centre of Newcastle was still the Sandhill area, with many merchants living along the Close or on the Side. The path of the main road through Newcastle ran from the single Tyne bridge, through Sandhill to the Side, a narrow street which climbed steeply on the north-east side of the castle hill until it reached the higher ground alongside St Nicholas' Church. As Newcastle developed, the Side became lined with buildings with projecting upper stories, so that the main street through Newcastle was a narrow, congested, steep thoroughfare.

In 1701 the Keelmen's Hospital was built in the Sandgate area of the city, using funds provided by the keelmen. The building still stands today.

== Eighteenth century ==
In the 18th century, Newcastle was the country's largest print centre after London, Oxford and Cambridge, and the Literary and Philosophical Society of 1793, with its erudite debates and large stock of books in several languages predated the London Library by half a century.

In 1715, during the Jacobite rising in favour of the Old Pretender, an army of Jacobite supporters marched on Newcastle. Many of the Northumbrian gentry joined the rebels. The citizens prepared for its arrival by arresting Jacobite supporters and accepting 700 extra recruits into the local militia. The gates of the city were closed against the rebels. This proved enough to delay an attack until reinforcements arrived forcing the rebel army to move across to the west coast. The rebels finally surrendered at Preston.

In 1745, during a second Jacobite rising in favour of the Young Pretender, a Scottish army crossed the border led by Bonnie Prince Charlie. Once again Newcastle prepared by arresting Jacobite supporters and inducting 800 volunteers into the local militia. The town walls were strengthened, most of the gates were blocked up and some 200 cannon were deployed. 20,000 regulars were billeted on the Town Moor. These preparations were enough to force the rebel army to travel south via the west coast. They were eventually defeated at Culloden in 1746.

Newcastle's actions during the 1715 rising in resisting the rebels and declaring for George I, in contrast to the rest of the region, is the most likely source of the nickname 'Geordie', applied to people from Tyneside, or more accurately Newcastle. Another theory, however, is that the name 'Geordie' came from the inventor of the Geordie lamp, George Stephenson. It was a type of safety lamp used in mining, but was not invented until 1815. Apparently the term 'German Geordie' was in common use during the 18th century.

The city's first hospital, Newcastle Infirmary opened in 1753; it was funded by public subscription. A lying-in hospital was established in Newcastle in 1760. The city's first public hospital for mentally ill patients, Wardens Close Lunatic Hospital was opened in October 1767.

In 1771 a flood swept away much of the bridge at Newcastle. The bridge had been built in 1250 and repaired after a flood in 1339. The bridge supported various houses and three towers and an old chapel. A blue stone was placed in the middle of the bridge to mark the boundary between Newcastle and the Palatinate of Durham. A temporary wooden bridge had to be built, and this remained in use until 1781, when a new stone bridge was completed. The new bridge consisted of nine arches. In 1801, because of the pressure of traffic, the bridge had to be widened.

A permanent military presence was established in the city with the completion of Fenham Barracks in 1806. The facilities at the Castle for holding assizes, which had been condemned for their inconvenience and unhealthiness, were replaced when the Moot Hall opened in August 1812.

== Victorian period ==
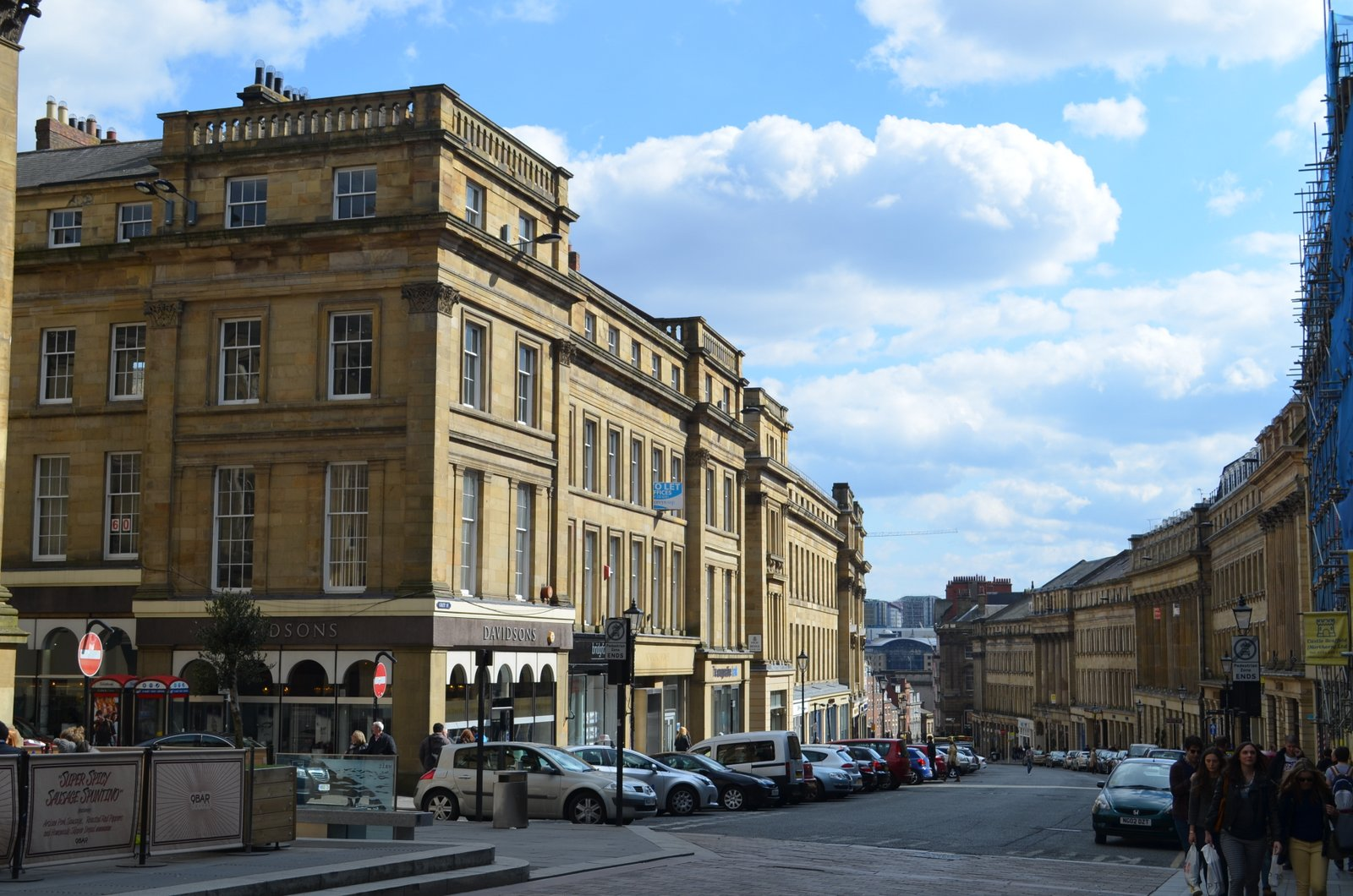
Newcastle Grey Street, built in the 1830s.

Present-day Newcastle owes much of its architecture to the work of the builder Richard Grainger, aided by architects John Dobson, Thomas Oliver, John and Benjamin Green and others. In 1834 Grainger won a competition to produce a new plan for central Newcastle. He put this plan into effect using the above architects as well as architects employed in his own office. Grainger and Oliver had already built Leazes Terrace, Leazes Crescent and Leazes Place between 1829 and 1834. Grainger and Dobson had also built the Royal Arcade at the foot of Pilgrim Street between 1830 and 1832. The most ambitious project covered 12 acres 12 acres (49,000 m^{2}) in central Newcastle, on the site of Newe House (also called Anderson Place). Grainger built three new thoroughfares, Grey Street, Grainger Street and Clayton Street with many connecting streets, as well as the Central Exchange and the Grainger Market. John Wardle and George Walker, working in Grainger's office, designed Clayton Street, Grainger Street and most of Grey Street. Dobson designed the Grainger Market and much of the east side of Grey Street. John and Benjamin Green designed the Theatre Royal at the top of Grey Street, where Grainger placed the column of Grey's Monument as a focus for the whole scheme. Grey Street is considered to be one of the finest streets in the country, with its elegant curve. Unfortunately most of old Eldon Square was demolished in the 1960s in the name of progress. The Royal Arcade met a similar fate.

The Northumberland Baths on Northumberland Road, also designed by Dobson and since demolished, were completed in 1838.

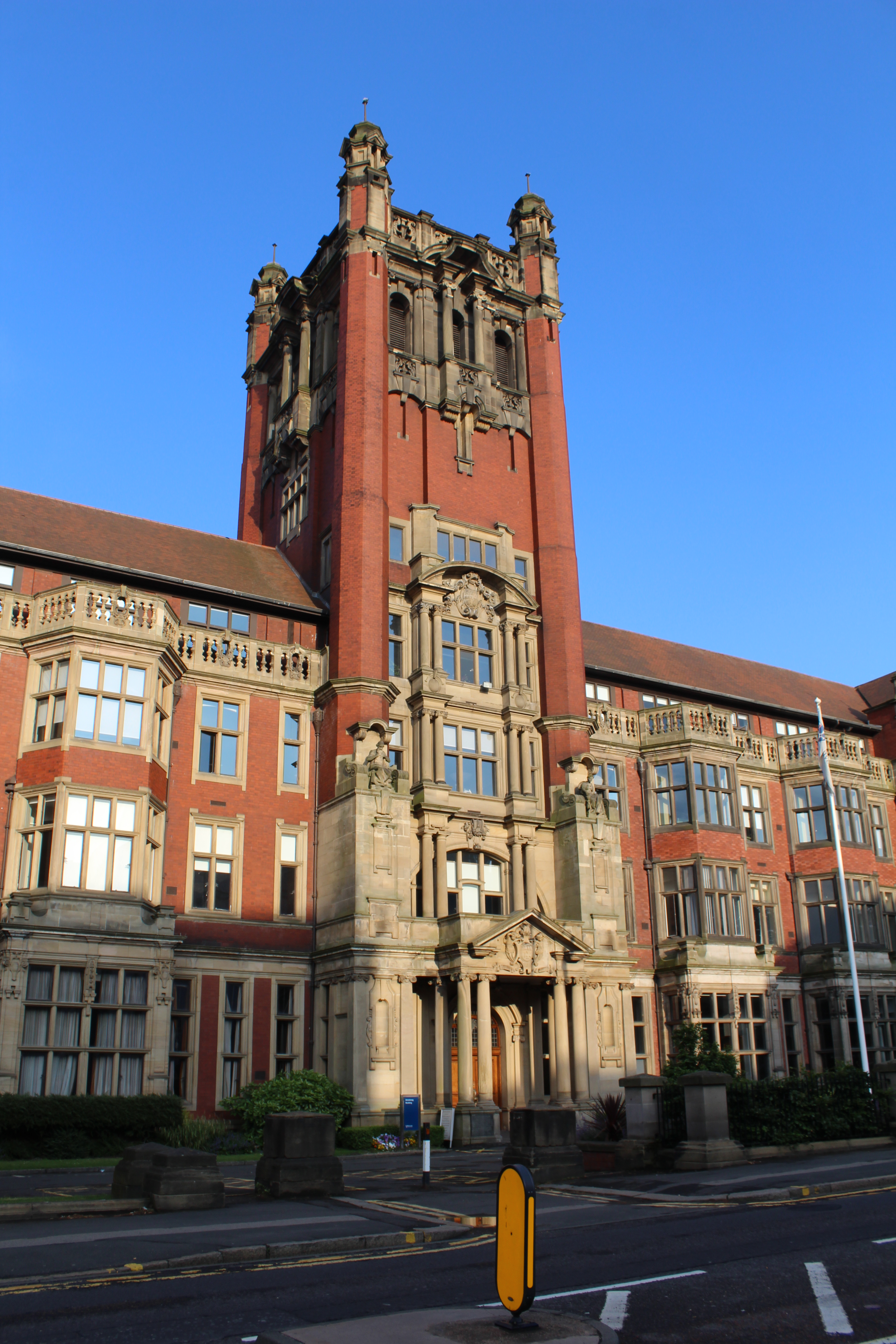
The Armstrong Building, now part of Newcastle University.

In 1849 a new bridge was built across the river at Newcastle. This was the High Level Bridge, designed by Robert Stephenson, and slightly up river from the existing bridge. The bridge was designed to carry road and rail traffic across the Tyne Gorge on two decks with rail traffic on the upper deck and road traffic on the lower. The new bridge meant that traffic could pass through Newcastle without having to negotiate the steep, narrow Side, as had been necessary for centuries. The bridge was opened by Queen Victoria, who one year later opened the new Central Station, designed by John Dobson. Trains were now able to cross the river, directly into the centre of Newcastle and carry on up to Scotland. The Army Riding School was also completed in 1849.

In 1854 a large fire started on the Gateshead quayside and an explosion caused it to spread across the river to the Newcastle quayside. A huge conflagration amongst the narrow alleys, or 'chares', destroyed the homes of 800 families as well as many business premises. The narrow alleys that had been destroyed were replaced by streets containing blocks of modern offices.

In 1863 the Town Hall in St Nicholas Square replaced the Guildhall as the meeting place of Newcastle Town Council.

In 1876 the low level bridge was replaced by a new bridge known as the Swing Bridge, so called because the bridge was able to swing horizontally on a central axis and allow ships to pass on either side. This meant that for the first time sizeable ships could pass up-river beyond Newcastle. The bridge was built and paid for by William Armstrong, a local arms manufacturer, who needed to have warships access his Elswick arms factory to fit armaments to them. The Swing Bridge's rotating mechanism is adapted from the cannon mounts developed in Armstrong's arms works. In 1882 the Elswick works began to build ships as well as to arm them. The Barrack Road drill hall was completed in 1890.

== Industrialisation ==
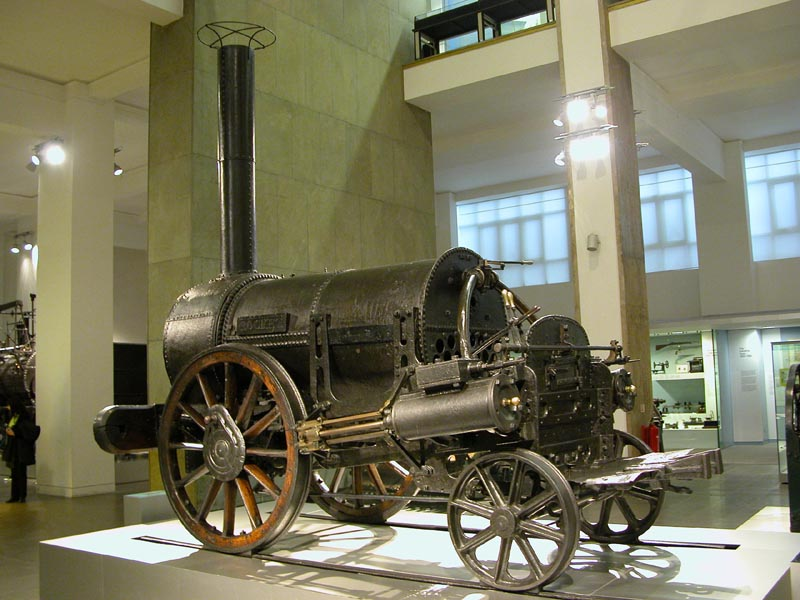
George Stephenson's Rocket, built in Newcastle, now in the Science Museum, London

In the 19th century, shipbuilding and heavy engineering were central to the city's prosperity; and the city was a powerhouse of the Industrial Revolution. Newcastle's development as a major city owed most to its central role in the production and export of coal. The phrase "taking coals to Newcastle" was first recorded in 1538; it proverbially denotes bringing a particular commodity to a place that has more than enough of it already.

=== Local innovation ===
Innovation in Newcastle and surrounding areas included the following:

- George Stephenson developed a miner's safety lamp at the same time that Humphry Davy developed a rival design. The lamp made possible the opening up of ever deeper mines to provide the coal that powered the Industrial Revolution.
- George and his son Robert Stephenson were hugely influential figures in the development of the early railways. George developed Blücher, a locomotive working at Killingworth colliery in 1814, whilst Robert was instrumental in the design of Rocket, a revolutionary design that was the forerunner of modern locomotives. Both men were involved in planning and building railway lines, all over this country and abroad.
- Joseph Swan demonstrated a working electric light bulb about a year before Thomas Edison did the same in the USA. This led to a dispute as to who had actually invented the light bulb. Eventually the two rivals agreed to form a mutual company between them, the Edison and Swan Electric Light Company, known as Ediswan.
- Charles Algernon Parsons invented the steam turbine, for marine use and for power generation. He used Turbinia, a small, turbine-powered ship, to demonstrate the speed that a steam turbine could generate. Turbinia literally ran rings around the British Fleet at a review at Spithead in 1897.
- William Armstrong invented a hydraulic crane that was installed in dockyards up and down the country. He then began to design light, accurate field guns for the British army. These were a vast improvement on the existing guns that were then in use.

The following major industries developed in Newcastle or its surrounding area:

=== Glassmaking ===
A small glass industry existed in Newcastle from the mid-15th century. In 1615 restrictions were put on the use of wood for manufacturing glass. It was found that glass could be manufactured using the local coal, and so a glassmaking industry grew up on Tyneside. Huguenot glassmakers came over from France as refugees from persecution and set up glasshouses in the Skinnerburn area of Newcastle. Eventually, glass production moved to the Ouseburn area of Newcastle. In 1684 the Dagnia family, Sephardic Jewish emigrants from Altare, arrived in Newcastle from Stourbridge and established glasshouses along the Close, to manufacture high quality flint glass. The glass manufacturers used sand ballast from the boats arriving in the river as the main raw material. The glassware was then exported in collier brigs. The period from 1730 to 1785 was the highpoint of Newcastle glass manufacture, when the local glassmakers produced the 'Newcastle Light Baluster'. The glassmaking industry still exists in the west end of the city with local Artist and Glassmaker Jane Charles carrying on over four hundred years of hot glass blowing in Newcastle upon Tyne.

=== Locomotive manufacture ===
In 1823 George Stephenson and his son Robert established the world's first locomotive factory near Forth Street in Newcastle. Here they built locomotives for the Stockton and Darlington Railway and the Liverpool and Manchester Railway, as well as many others. It was here that the famous locomotive Rocket was designed and manufactured in preparation for the Rainhill Trials. Apart from building locomotives for the British market, the Newcastle works also produced locomotives for Europe and America. The Forth Street works continued to build locomotives until 1960.

=== Shipbuilding ===
In 1296 a wooden, 135 ft (41 m) long galley was constructed at the mouth of the Lort Burn in Newcastle, as part of a twenty-ship order from the king. The ship cost £205, and is the earliest record of shipbuilding in Newcastle. However the rise of the Tyne as a shipbuilding area was due to the need for collier brigs for the coal export trade. These wooden sailing ships were usually built locally, establishing local expertise in building ships. As ships changed from wood to steel, and from sail to steam, the local shipbuilding industry changed to build the new ships. Although shipbuilding was carried out up and down both sides of the river, the two main areas for building ships in Newcastle were Elswick, to the west, and Walker, to the east. By 1800 Tyneside was the third largest producer of ships in Britain. Unfortunately, after the Second World War, lack of modernisation and competition from abroad gradually caused the local industry to decline and die.

=== Armaments ===
In 1847 William Armstrong established a huge factory in Elswick, west of Newcastle. This was initially used to produce hydraulic cranes but subsequently began also to produce guns for both the army and the navy. After the Swing Bridge was built in 1876 allowing ships to pass up river, warships could have their armaments fitted alongside the Elswick works. Armstrong's company took over its industrial rival, Joseph Whitworth of Manchester in 1897.

=== Steam turbines ===
Charles Algernon Parsons invented the steam turbine and, in 1889, founded his own company C. A. Parsons and Company in Heaton, Newcastle to make steam turbines. Shortly after this, he realised that steam turbines could be used to propel ships and, in 1897, he founded a second company, Parsons Marine Steam Turbine Company in Wallsend. It is there that he designed and manufactured Turbinia. Parsons turbines were initially used in warships but soon came to be used in merchant and passenger vessels, including the liner Mauretania which held the blue riband for the Atlantic crossing until 1929. Parsons' company in Heaton began to make turbo-generators for power stations and supplied power stations all over the world. The Heaton works, reduced in size, remains as part of the Siemens AG industrial giant.

=== Pottery ===
In 1762 the Maling pottery was founded in Sunderland by French Huguenots, but transferred to Newcastle in 1817. A factory was built in the Ouseburn area of the city. The factory was rebuilt twice, finally occupying a 14-acre (57,000 m^{2}) site that was claimed to be the biggest pottery in the world and which had its own railway station. The pottery pioneered use of machines in making potteries as opposed to hand production. In the 1890s the company went up-market and employed in-house designers. The period up to the Second World War was the most profitable with a constant stream of new designs being introduced. However, after the war, production gradually declined and the company closed in 1963.

== Expansion of the city ==
Newcastle was one of the boroughs reformed by the Municipal Corporations Act 1835: the reformed municipal borough included the parishes of Byker, Elswick, Heaton, Jesmond, Newcastle All Saints, Newcastle St Andrew, Newcastle St John, Newcastle St Nicholas, and Westgate. The urban districts of Benwell and Fenham and Walker were added in 1904. In 1935, Newcastle gained Kenton and parts of the parishes of West Brunton, East Denton, Fawdon, Longbenton. The most recent expansion in Newcastle's boundaries took place under the Local Government Act 1972 on 1 April 1974, when Newcastle became a metropolitan borough, also including the urban districts of Gosforth and Newburn, and the parishes of Brunswick, Dinnington, Hazlerigg, North Gosforth and Woolsington from the Castle Ward Rural District, and the village of Westerhope.

Meanwhile Northumberland County Council was formed under the Local Government Act 1888 and benefited from a dedicated meeting place when County Hall was completed in the Castle Garth area of Newcastle in 1910. Following implementation of the Local Government Act 1972, Northumberland County Council relocated to County Hall, Morpeth in April 1981.

== Twentieth century ==
The earliest surviving public baths in the city, the Gibson Street Baths and the Shipley Street Baths, both opened in 1907.

In 1925 work began on a new high-level road bridge to span the Tyne Gorge between Newcastle and Gateshead. The capacity of the existing High-Level Bridge and Swing Bridge were being strained to the limit, and an additional bridge had been discussed for a long time. The contract was awarded to the Dorman Long Company and the bridge was finally opened by King George V in 1928. The road deck was 84 feet (26 m) above the river and was supported by a 531 feet (162 m) steel arch. The new Tyne Bridge quickly became a symbol for Newcastle and Tyneside, and remains so today.

During the Second World War, Newcastle was largely spared the horrors inflicted upon other British cities bombed during the Blitz. Although the armaments factories and shipyards along the River Tyne were targeted by the Luftwaffe, they largely escaped unscathed. Manors goods yard and railway terminal, to the east of the city centre, and the suburbs of Jesmond and Heaton suffered bombing during 1941. There were 141 deaths and 587 injuries, a relatively small figure compared to the casualties in other industrial centres of Britain.

In 1963 the city gained its own university, the University of Newcastle upon Tyne, by act of parliament. A School of Medicine and Surgery had been established in Newcastle in 1834. This eventually developed into a college of medicine attached to Durham University. A college of physical science was also founded and became Armstrong College in 1904. In 1934 the two colleges merged to become King's College, Durham. This remained as part of Durham University until the new university was created in 1963. In 1992 the city gained its second university when Newcastle Polytechnic was granted university status as Northumbria University.

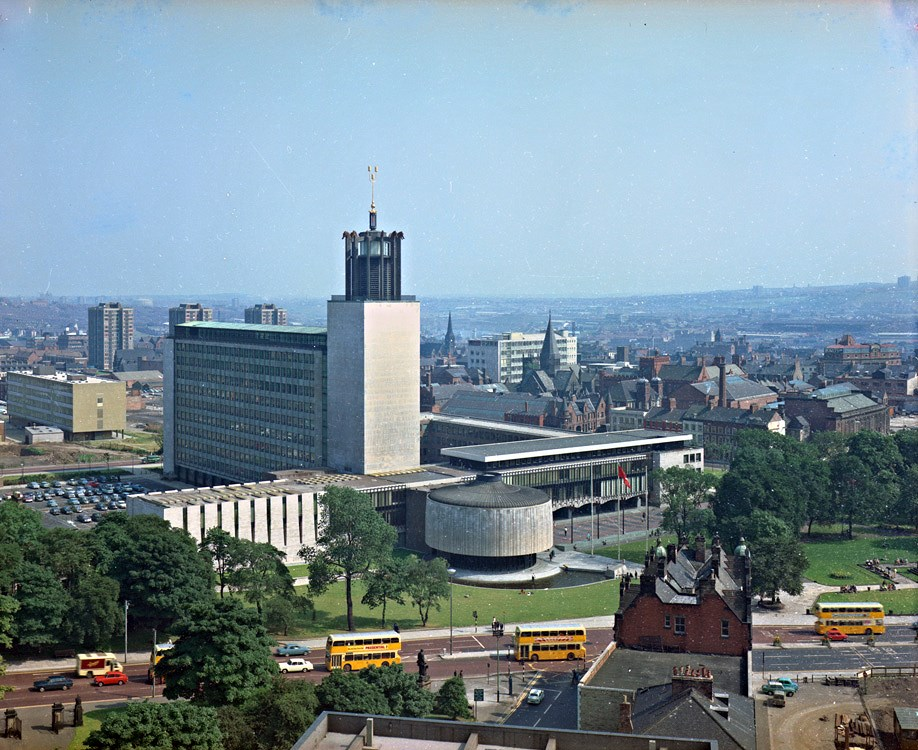
Newcastle Civic Centre, 1969

The Mansion House was gifted to the city in 1953, and Newcastle City Council moved to the new Newcastle Civic Centre in 1968.

As heavy industries declined in the second half of the 20th century, large sections of the city centre were demolished along with many areas of slum housing. The leading political figure in the city during the 1960s was T. Dan Smith who oversaw a massive building programme of highrise housing estates and authorised the demolition of a quarter of the Georgian Grainger Town to make way for Eldon Square Shopping Centre. Smith's control in Newcastle collapsed when it was exposed that he had used public contracts to advantage himself and his business associates and for a time Newcastle became a byword for civic corruption as depicted in the films Get Carter and Stormy Monday and in the television series Our Friends in the North. However, much of the historic Grainger Town area survived and was, for the most part, fully restored in the late 1990s. Northumberland Street, initially the A1, was gradually closed to traffic from the 1970s and completely pedestrianised by 1998.

In 1978 a new rapid transport system, the Metro, was built, linking the Tyneside area. The system opened in August 1980. A new bridge was built to carry the Metro across the river between Gateshead and Newcastle. This was the Queen Elizabeth II Bridge, commonly known as the Metro Bridge. Eventually the Metro system was extended to reach Newcastle Airport in 1991, and in 2002 the Metro system was extended to the nearby city of Sunderland.

As the 20th century progressed, trade on the Newcastle and Gateshead quaysides gradually declined, until by the 1980s both sides of the river were looking rather derelict. Shipping company offices had closed along with offices of firms related to shipping. There were also derelict warehouses lining the riverbank. Local government produced a master plan to re-develop the Newcastle quayside and this was begun in the 1990s. New offices, restaurants, bars and residential accommodation were built and the area has changed in the space of a few years into a vibrant area, partially returning the focus of Newcastle to the riverside, where it was in medieval times.

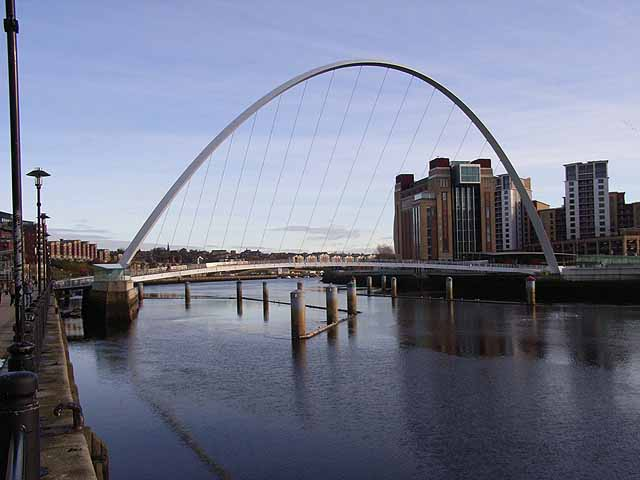
The Millennium Bridge, linking Newcastle and Gateshead (at right)

The Gateshead Millennium Bridge, a foot and cycle bridge, 26 feet (7.9 m) wide and 413 feet (126 m) long, was completed in 2001. The road deck is in the form of a curve and is supported by a steel arch. To allow ships to pass, the whole structure, both arch and road-deck, rotates on huge bearings at either end so that the road deck is lifted. The bridge can be said to open and shut like a human eye. It is an important addition to the re-developed quayside area, providing a vital link between the Newcastle and Gateshead quaysides.

== Recent developments ==
Today the city is a vibrant centre for office and retail employment, but just a short distance away there are impoverished inner-city housing estates, in areas originally built to provide affordable housing for employees of the shipyards and other heavy industries that lined the River Tyne. In the 2010s Newcastle City Council began implementing plans to regenerate these depressed areas, such as those along the Ouseburn Valley.

== See also ==
- Trolleybuses in Newcastle upon Tyne
- Timeline of Newcastle upon Tyne
