= County town =

County administrative centre

In Great Britain and Ireland, a county town is usually the location of administrative or judicial functions within a county, and the place where public representatives are elected to parliament. Following the establishment of county councils in England in 1889, the headquarters of the new councils were usually established in the county town of each county; however, the concept of a county town pre-dates these councils.

The concept of a county town is ill-defined and unofficial. Some counties in Great Britain have their administrative bodies housed elsewhere. For example, Lancaster is the county town of Lancashire, but the county council is in Preston. Owing to the creation of unitary authorities, some county towns in Great Britain are administratively separate from the county. For example, Nottingham is separated from the rest of Nottinghamshire. On a ceremonial level, such towns are in their own respective counties geographically.

== Great Britain, historic ==
=== England ===
This list shows towns or cities which held county functions at various points in time.

County	Named after or of same root	Places that held county functions
Bedfordshire	Bedford	
Berkshire	N/A	Reading or Abingdon (Note: Lent assizes were held at Reading, where the county gaol and house of correction were situated; summer assizes were held at Abingdon, which was the site of the county bridewell. Knights of the shire were nominated at Reading and elected at Abingdon.)
Buckinghamshire	Buckingham	Aylesbury (Note: Sir John Baldwin, Chief Justice of the Common Pleas, caused the county assizes to be moved to Aylesbury. Knights of the shire continued to be elected at Buckingham. The 1911 Encyclopædia Britannica considered Buckingham to be the county town.)
Cambridgeshire	Cambridge	Ely
Cheshire	Chester	
Cornwall	N/A	Truro, Bodmin or Launceston (Note: The county assize court sat at Bodmin, and the 1911 Britannica considered Bodmin to be the county town. Prior to 1835, it was Launceston.)
Cumberland	Carlisle (county later renamed)	Cockermouth or Penrith (Note: Knights of the shire were elected at Cockermouth; the assizes and quarter sessions courts were occasionally held at Penrith.)
Derbyshire	Derby	
Devon	N/A	Exeter
Dorset	Dorchester	Poole
County Durham	Durham	Bishop Auckland or Sadberge
Essex	N/A	Chelmsford
Gloucestershire	Gloucester	Bristol
Hampshire	Southampton	Winchester
Herefordshire	Hereford	
Hertfordshire	Hertford	
Huntingdonshire	Huntingdon	
Kent	Canterbury (name of same origin)	Maidstone (Note: East Kent and West Kent had separate administrations until 1814, with East Kent sessions meeting at Canterbury, and West Kent at Maidstone, the over-all county town.)
Lancashire	Lancaster	Preston (Note: In 1787 the Lancashire Quarter Sessions decreed that in future the annual general sessions for transacting all business for the county at large should be held at Preston as it was "a central place in the county." The magistrates of Lonsdale Hundred refused to accept the decision and would meet only at Lancaster. The matter was settled only when a local act of Parliament, the Lancaster Annual General Sessions Act 1798 (38 Geo. 3. c. 58), established that the principal administrative business of the county could be transacted only at Preston.)
Leicestershire	Leicester	
Lincolnshire	Lincoln (Note: Lindsey, Kesteven and Holland had separate administrations until 1974, with Holland sessions meeting at Boston, Kesteven at Sleaford, and Lindsey at Lincoln, the overall county town.)	
Middlesex	N/A	Brentford, Clerkenwell, London or Westminster (Note: Knights of the shire were elected at Brentford; sessions presided over by Middlesex Justices of the Peace were held at Clerkenwell; trials for persons accused of the most serious crimes took place in the Old Bailey before the Aldermen of the City prior to the committing of the accused to Newgate Prison (which functioned as the county gaol for Middlesex) if found guilty; while the county council had its headquarters at the Middlesex Guildhall in Westminster from its establishment in 1889 until its abolition in 1965.)
Norfolk	N/A	Norwich
Northamptonshire	Northampton	
Northumberland	N/A	Alnwick, Newcastle upon Tyne, Morpeth or Berwick upon Tweed (Note: Alnwick's position as the county town seems to have been based largely on its castle being the seat of the Duke of Northumberland, although knights of the shire were elected at the town too. Assizes for the county however were held mainly or exclusively in Newcastle upon Tyne. Morpeth Castle was used as the prison for Northumberland, and the county gaol was built there in 1824.)
Nottinghamshire	Nottingham (Note: Nottingham was constituted a county corporate separate from Nottinghamshire in 1449. The area containing the Shire Hall however remained an exclave of Nottinghamshire.)	
Oxfordshire	Oxford	
Rutland	N/A	Oakham
Shropshire	Shrewsbury (spellings diverged)	
Somerset	Somerton	Taunton, Ilchester, Bath or Wells (Note: Knights of the shire were elected at Ilchester. Somerton temporarily became the county town in the late thirteenth century, when the shire courts and county gaol were moved from Ilchester.)
Staffordshire	Stafford	Lichfield
Suffolk	N/A	Ipswich
Surrey	N/A	Guildford, Newington or Southwark (Note: Under the Surrey Gaol Act 1791 (31 Geo. 3. c. 22) the justices of the peace of the county of Surrey were empowered to build a new sessions house and county gaol at Newington adjacent to the borough of Southwark and in the suburbs of London. By 1799 the buildings were completed and the county administration was based there until 1893. Newington or Southwark (the ecclesiastical centre) were sometimes described as the county town thereafter, for instance in a school textbook of 1828.)
Sussex	N/A	Lewes, Chichester or Horsham (Note: Chichester was traditionally described as the capital city of Sussex and Lewes its county town. Horsham was occasionally described as the county town of Sussex due to the presence of the county gaol and the periodic holding of the county assizes and quarter sessions in the town. The last assizes were held there in 1830, while the gaol was closed in 1845.)
Warwickshire	Warwick	Coventry
Westmorland	N/A	Appleby or Kendal
Wiltshire	Wilton	Trowbridge, Salisbury or Devizes (Note: Wiltshire County Council note that Wiltshire "never had a well recognised county town". An 1870s gazetteer describes "Salisbury and Devizes" as the "county towns". The 1911 Encyclopædia Britannica names only Salisbury.)
Worcestershire	Worcester	
Yorkshire	York	Kingston upon Hull (Note: The county towns of the three "Ridings" are considered to be Beverley, Northallerton and Wakefield.)

=== Scotland ===
County	County town
Aberdeenshire	Aberdeen (Note: In 1900 Aberdeen became a county of a city and thus outside the remit of the county council.)
Angus (or Forfarshire)	Forfar
Argyll	Lochgilphead (formerly Inveraray) (Note: Inveraray (the seat of the Duke of Argyll) was regarded as the county town until 1890, when the Argyll County Council was created with headquarters in Lochgilphead.)
Ayrshire	Ayr
Banffshire	Banff
Berwickshire	Duns, Scottish Borders (formerly Berwick-upon-Tweed, formerly Greenlaw)
Bute	Rothesay
Caithness	Wick
Clackmannanshire	Alloa (formerly Clackmannan)
Cromartyshire	Cromarty
Dumfriesshire	Dumfries
Dunbartonshire	Dumbarton
East Lothian (or Haddingtonshire)	Haddington
Fife	Cupar
Inverness-shire	Inverness
Kincardineshire	Stonehaven (formerly Kincardine)
Kinross-shire	Kinross
Kirkcudbrightshire	Kirkcudbright
Lanarkshire	Lanark (Note: The headquarters of the Lanark County Council were established in 1890 in Glasgow. In 1893 Glasgow became a county of itself, and was therefore outside the council's area. The county council moved to Hamilton in 1964.)
Midlothian (or Edinburghshire)	Edinburgh (Note: Edinburgh was a county of itself, and therefore lay outside the remit of the county council.)
Morayshire (or Elginshire)	Elgin
Nairnshire	Nairn
Orkney	Kirkwall
Peeblesshire	Peebles
Perthshire	Perth
Renfrewshire	Renfrew (Note: The headquarters of Renfrew County Council were in Paisley from 1890.)
Ross-shire	Dingwall (also the county town of Ross and Cromarty)
Roxburghshire	Jedburgh (formerly Roxburgh) (Note: Newtown St Boswells was the administrative headquarters of the county council established in 1890.)
Selkirkshire	Selkirk
Shetland	Lerwick
Stirlingshire	Stirling
Sutherland	Dornoch (Note: The headquarters of Sutherland County Council were at Golspie from 1890.)
West Lothian (or Linlithgowshire)	Linlithgow
Wigtownshire	Wigtown (Note: Stranraer became the administrative headquarters of the Wigtown county council in 1890, and was sometimes described as the "county town" thereafter.)

=== Wales ===
Following the Norman invasion of Wales, the Cambro-Normans created the historic shire system (also known as ancient counties). Many of these counties were named for the centre of Norman power within the new county (Caernarfonshire named for Caernarfon, Monmouthshire named for Monmouth) others were named after the previous medieval Welsh kingdoms (Ceredigon becomes Cardigan, Morgannwg becomes Glamorgan). The 1535 Laws in Wales Act established the historic counties in English law, but in Wales they were later replaced with eight preserved counties for ceremonial purposes and the twenty two principal areas are used for administrative purposes. Neither of these subdivisions use official county towns, although their administrative headquarters and ceremonial centres are often located in the historic county town.

Name in English	Name in Welsh	County town in English	County town in Welsh
Anglesey	Ynys Môn	Beaumaris	Biwmares
Brecknockshire	Brycheiniog	Brecon	Aberhonddu
Caernarfonshire (formerly Carnarvonshire)	Sir Gaernarfon	Caernarfon	Caernarfon
Cardiganshire	Ceredigion	Cardigan	Aberteifi
Carmarthenshire	Sir Gaerfyrddin	Carmarthen	Caerfyrddin
Denbighshire	Sir Ddinbych	Ruthin (formerly Denbigh)	Rhuthun (formerly Dinbych)
Flintshire	Sir y Fflint	Mold (formerly Flint)	Yr Wyddgrug (formerly Y Fflint)
Glamorgan	Morgannwg	Cardiff	Caerdydd
Merioneth or Merionethshire	Meirionnydd or Sir Feirionnydd	Dolgellau	Dolgellau
Montgomeryshire	Sir Drefaldwyn	Welshpool (formerly Montgomery)	Y Trallwng (formerly Trefaldwyn)
Monmouthshire	Sir Fynwy	Monmouth	Trefynwy
Pembrokeshire	Sir Benfro	Haverfordwest (formerly Pembroke)	Hwlffordd (formerly Penfro)
Radnorshire	Sir Faesyfed	Presteigne (formerly New Radnor)	Llanandras (former Maesyfed)

== Great Britain, post 19th-century reforms ==
With the creation of elected county councils in 1889, the administrative headquarters in some cases moved away from the traditional county town. Furthermore, in 1965 and 1974 there were major boundary changes in England and Wales and administrative counties were replaced with new metropolitan and non-metropolitan counties. The boundaries underwent further alterations between 1995 and 1998 to create unitary authorities, and some of the ancient counties and county towns were restored. (Note: not all headquarters are or were called 'county hall' or 'shire hall' e.g.: Cumbria County Council's HQ up until 2016 was called The Courts and has since moved to Cumbria House.) Before 1974, many of the county halls were in towns and cities that had the status of a county borough i.e. a borough outside the county council's jurisdiction.

=== England, from 1889 ===
County council	Date	Headquarters
Bedfordshire	1889 to 2009	Bedford
Berkshire	1889 to 1998	Reading (county borough until 1974)
Buckinghamshire	1889 onwards	Aylesbury
Cambridgeshire	1889 to 1965 and 1974 onwards	Cambridge (until 2021); Alconbury Weald (after 2021)
Cheshire	1889 to 2009	Chester
Cornwall	1889 onwards	Truro
Cumberland	1889 to 1974	Carlisle (county borough from 1914)
Derbyshire	1889 onwards	Matlock (moved from Derby, county borough 1958)
Devon	1889 onwards	Exeter (county borough until 1974). In 1963 the Devon County Buildings Area was transferred from the county borough of Exeter to the administrative county of Devon, of which it formed an exclave until 1974.
Dorset	1889 onwards	Dorchester
Durham	1889 onwards	Durham
Essex	1889 onwards	Chelmsford
Gloucestershire	1889 onwards	Gloucester (county borough until 1974)
Hampshire	1889 onwards	Winchester
Herefordshire	1889 to 1974 and 1998 onwards	Hereford
Hertfordshire	1889 onwards	Hertford
Huntingdonshire	1889 to 1965	Huntingdon
Isle of Ely	1889 to 1965	March
Isle of Wight	1890 onwards	Newport
Kent	1889 onwards	Maidstone
Lancashire	1889 onwards	Preston (county borough until 1974)
Leicestershire	1889 onwards	Leicester
Lincolnshire, Parts of Lindsey	1889 to 1974	Lincoln (county borough)
Lincolnshire, Parts of Holland	1889 to 1974	Boston
Lincolnshire, Parts of Kesteven	1889 to 1974	Sleaford
London	1889 to 1965	Spring Gardens, Westminster until 1922, County Hall at Lambeth thereafter
Middlesex	1889 to 1965	Middlesex Guildhall at Westminster in County of London
Norfolk	1889 onwards	Norwich (county borough until 1974)
Northamptonshire	1889 onwards	Northampton (county borough until 1974)
Northumberland	1889 onwards	County Hall Newcastle upon Tyne 1889 – 1981; County Hall Morpeth since 1981
Nottinghamshire	1889 onwards	West Bridgford (moved from county borough of Nottingham in 1959)
Oxfordshire	1889 onwards	Oxford (county borough until 1974)
Soke of Peterborough	1889 to 1965	Peterborough
Rutland	1889 to 1974 and 1997 onwards	Oakham
Shropshire	1889 onwards	Shrewsbury
Somerset	1889 onwards	Taunton
Staffordshire	1889 onwards	Stafford
East Suffolk	1889 to 1974	Ipswich (county borough)
West Suffolk	1889 to 1974	Bury St Edmunds
Surrey	1889 onwards	Inner London Sessions House, Newington (until 1893); County Hall, Kingston upon Thames (1893–2020); Woodhatch Place, Reigate (2021 onwards)
East Sussex	1889 onwards	Lewes
West Sussex	1889 onwards	Chichester (originally jointly with Horsham)
Warwickshire	1889 onwards	Warwick
Westmorland	1889 to 1974	Kendal
Wiltshire	1889 onwards	Trowbridge
Worcestershire	1889 to 1974 and 1998 onwards	Worcester (county borough until 1974)
Yorkshire, East Riding	1889 to 1974 and 1996 onwards	Beverley (later HQ of Humberside)
Yorkshire, North Riding	1889 to 1974	Northallerton
Yorkshire, West Riding	1889 to 1974	Wakefield (county borough from 1915)

=== England, from 1965 ===
County council	Date	Headquarters
Avon	1974 to 1996	Bristol
Bristol	1996 onwards	Bristol
Cambridgeshire and Isle of Ely	1965 to 1974	Cambridge
Cleveland	1974 to 1996	Middlesbrough
Cumbria	1974 to 2023	Carlisle
Greater London	1965 to 1986 and 2002 onwards	County Hall, Lambeth (Greater London Council) (1965–1986); City Hall, Southwark (Greater London Authority) (2002–2021); City Hall, Newham (Greater London Authority) (2021 onwards)
Greater Manchester	1974 to 1986	Manchester
Hereford and Worcester	1974 to 1998	Worcester
Humberside	1974 to 1996	Beverley
Huntingdon and Peterborough	1965 to 1974	Huntingdon
Lincolnshire	1974 onwards	Lincoln
Merseyside	1974 to 1986	Liverpool
Suffolk	1974 onwards	Ipswich
Tyne and Wear	1974 to 1986	Newcastle upon Tyne
West Midlands	1974 to 1986	Birmingham
North Yorkshire	1974 onwards	Northallerton
South Yorkshire	1974 to 1986	Barnsley
West Yorkshire	1974 to 1986	Wakefield

=== Wales ===
County council	Date	Headquarters
Anglesey	1889 to 1974	Beaumaris^{1}
Brecknockshire	1889 to 1974	Brecon
Caernarvonshire	1889 to 1974	Caernarfon
Carmarthenshire	1889 to 1974; 1996 onwards	Carmarthen
Cardiganshire	1889 to 1974	Aberystwyth^{2}
Ceredigion	1996 onwards	Aberaeron
Clwyd	1974 to 1996	Mold
Denbighshire	1889 to 1974	Denbigh
Dyfed	1974 to 1996	Carmarthen
Flintshire	1889 to 1974	Mold
Glamorgan	1889 to 1974	Cardiff (county borough)
Gwent	1974 to 1996	Newport (1974–78), Cwmbran (1978–96)
Gwynedd	1974 onwards	Caernarfon
Mid Glamorgan	1974 to 1996	Cardiff (extraterritorial)
Merionethshire	1889 to 1974	Dolgellau
Montgomeryshire	1889 to 1974	Welshpool
Monmouthshire	1889 to 1974	Newport (county borough from 1891)
Radnorshire	1889 to 1974	Presteigne^{3}
Pembrokeshire	1889 to 1974; 1996 onwards	Haverfordwest
Powys	1974 onwards	Llandrindod Wells
South Glamorgan	1974 to 1996	Cardiff
West Glamorgan	1974 to 1996	Swansea
Isle of Anglesey	1996 onwards	Llangefni

1. Due to its better transport links and more central location, some administrative functions were moved to Llangefni.
2. Cardigan was often still referred to as 'the county town' due to the name link. However, assizes were held at Lampeter while Aberystwyth housed the administration of the county council. Aberystwyth was therefore the de facto county town.
3. Due to its better transport links and more central location, some administrative functions were moved to Llandrindod Wells.

== Republic of Ireland and Northern Ireland ==
=== Republic of Ireland ===
The follow lists the location of the administration of each of the 31 local authorities in the Republic of Ireland, with 26 of the traditional counties.

County	Councils	County town	Notes
County Carlow	Carlow County Council	Carlow	
County Cavan	Cavan County Council	Cavan	
County Clare	Clare County Council	Ennis	
County Cork	Cork County Council	Cork city	
County Cork	Cork City Council	Cork city	
County Donegal	Donegal County Council	Lifford	
County Dublin	Dublin City Council	Dublin city	
County Dublin	Dún Laoghaire–Rathdown County Council	Dún Laoghaire	Until 1994, formed Dublin County Council, with its administrative offices in Dublin city
County Dublin	Fingal County Council	Swords	Until 1994, formed Dublin County Council, with its administrative offices in Dublin city
County Dublin	South Dublin County Council	Tallaght	Until 1994, formed Dublin County Council, with its administrative offices in Dublin city
County Galway	Galway City Council	Galway city	
County Galway	Galway County Council	Galway city	
County Kerry	Kerry County Council	Tralee	
County Kildare	Kildare County Council	Naas	
County Kilkenny	Kilkenny County Council	Kilkenny city	
County Laois	Laois County Council	Portlaoise	Called Maryborough until 1929
County Leitrim	Leitrim County Council	Carrick-on-Shannon	
County Limerick	Limerick City and County Council	Limerick	
County Longford	Longford County Council	Longford	
County Louth	Louth County Council	Dundalk	
County Mayo	Mayo County Council	Castlebar	
County Meath	Meath County Council	Navan	previously Trim was the administrative town
County Monaghan	Monaghan County Council	Monaghan	
County Offaly	Offaly County Council	Tullamore	Prior to 1883, the county town was Daingean, then known as Philipstown
County Roscommon	Roscommon County Council	Roscommon	
County Sligo	Sligo County Council	Sligo	
County Tipperary	Tipperary County Council	Clonmel/Nenagh	Until the Local Government Reform Act 2014, these were respectively the administrative towns of South Tipperary County Council and North Tipperary County Council
County Waterford	Waterford City and County Council	Waterford	Prior to the merger of Waterford County Council with Waterford City Council in 2014, Dungarvan was the county town and administrative centre of County Waterford.
County Westmeath	Westmeath County Council	Mullingar	
County Wexford	Wexford County Council	Wexford	
County Wicklow	Wicklow County Council	Wicklow	

=== Northern Ireland ===
County	County town
County Antrim	Antrim
County Armagh	Armagh
County Down	Downpatrick
County Fermanagh	Enniskillen
County Londonderry	Coleraine
County Tyrone	Omagh

Note – Despite the fact that Belfast is the capital of Northern Ireland, it is not the county town of any county. Greater Belfast straddles two counties – Antrim and Down.

== See also ==
- Administrative centre
- County seat
