= Austin Friars (disambiguation) =

Austin Friars, formerly Austin Friars St Monica's School, is an independent day school, located in Carlisle, Cumbria.

Austin Friars may also refer to:

- Austin Friars, London, a former friary in London
- Austin Friars, Newcastle-upon-Tyne, a friary in Tyne and Wear, England
- Austin Friars, King's Lynn, a friary in Norfolk, England
- Dutch Church, Austin Friars, City of London

== See also ==
- Augustinians, a Christian order based on the rules of St. Augustine of Hippo
- Order of Saint Augustine (Augustinian Friars or Austin Friars), a Catholic religious order
