= County Hall, Morpeth =

County building in Morpeth, Northumberland, England

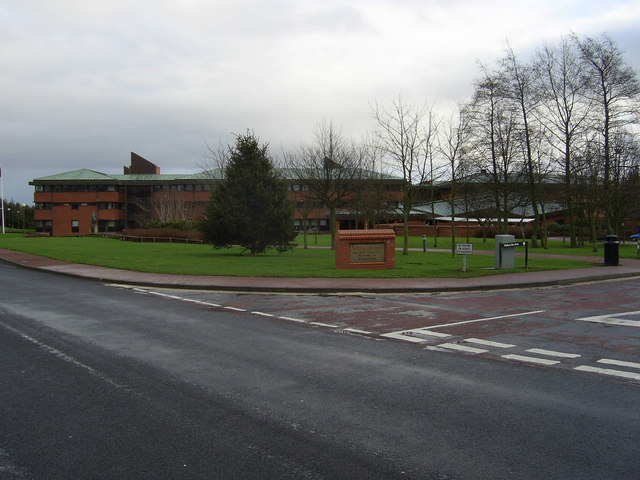
- County Hall

- Location within Northumberland

General information
- Location: Morpeth, Northumberland, United Kingdom
- Coordinates: 55.1536°N 1.6841°W
- Completed: 1981

Design and construction
- Architect: Modern style

County Hall is a municipal building in Morpeth, Northumberland, United Kingdom. It is the offices and meeting place of Northumberland County Council. The current building was completed in April 1981, after the county hall was moved from the old county hall in Newcastle. A statue of a Viking Warrior stands outside the building and was moved there from Doxford Hall.

== History ==
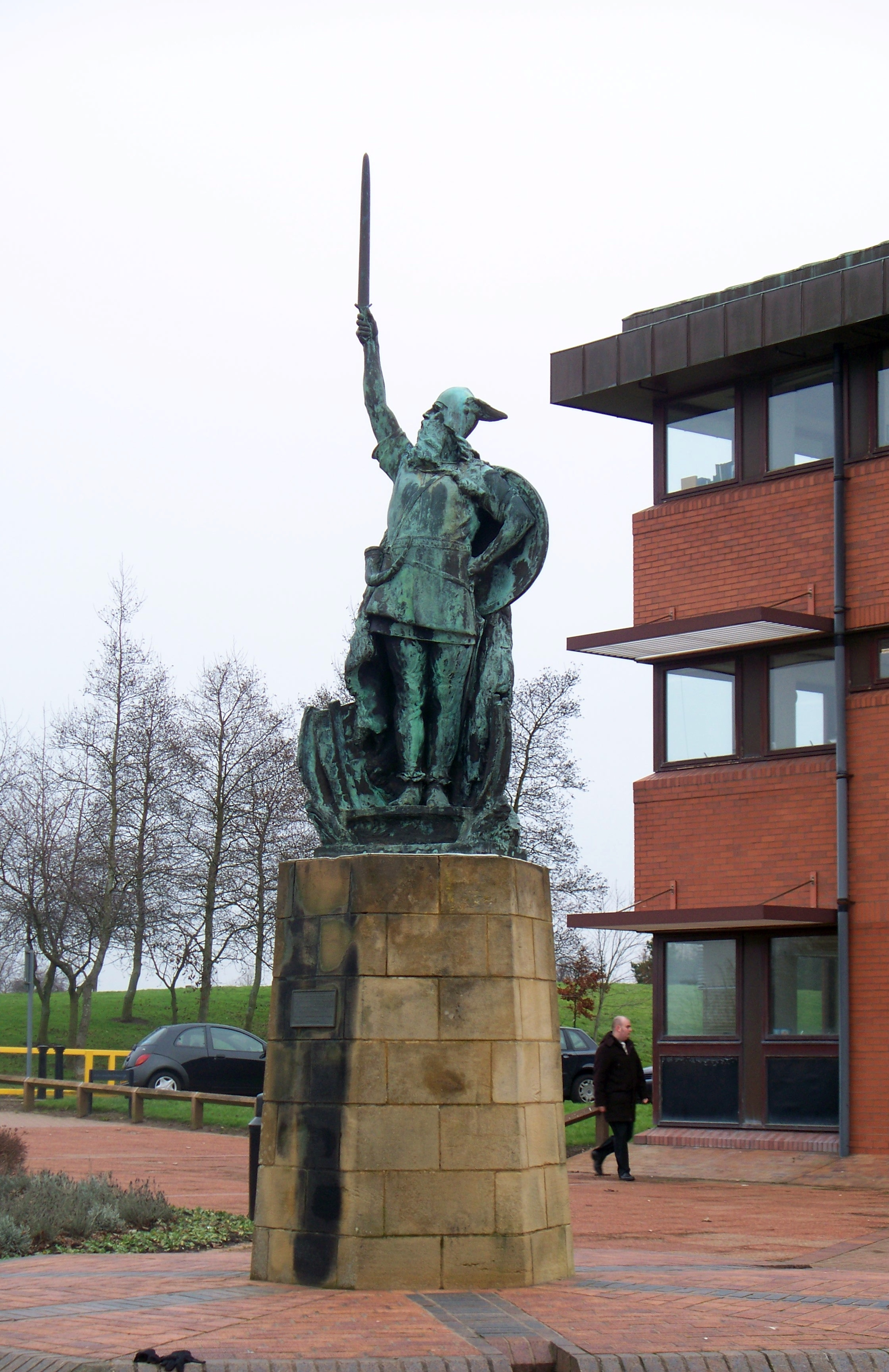
Statue of Viking warrior

For much of the 20th century County Hall was situated within an exclave of Northumberland (in the Moot Hall precincts) within the county borough of Newcastle upon Tyne; the area became part of the county of Tyne and Wear in 1974 and was thus extraterritorial to the county of Northumberland. After deciding that this arrangement was unsatisfactory, county leaders chose to procure a new purpose-built county headquarters within the territorial limits of the county: the site selected in Morpeth had previously been agricultural land.

The foundation stone for the new building was laid by Queen Elizabeth The Queen Mother on 6 April 1979. It was designed in the modern style and was opened on 21 April 1981. The design for the three-storey building involved continuous bands of glazing with red brick above and below: Nikolaus Pevsner described it as a "spreading building of informal style in brick".

A statue of a Viking Warrior, which had been sculpted by Margaret Wrightson in 1925 and placed in the grounds of Doxford Hall, was relocated to Morpeth at that time of the construction of County Hall. Queen Elizabeth II, accompanied by the Duke of Edinburgh and the Duchess of Northumberland had lunch at County Hall on 26 July 2001.

In October 2014 county leaders announced proposals to move the county headquarters to Ashington. However, after a change in political leadership, the new county leaders announced, in May 2017, that the proposals would be abandoned. Instead a phased programme of refurbishment works were announced with a project to repair the external fabric of the building approved in February 2018, a project to repair back-of-house office areas approved in November 2018 and a project to repair the reception area approved in March 2020.
