= Northumberland County Council =

Local authority in North East England

Coordinates: 55°09′13″N 1°41′03″W

Type
- Type: Unitary authority

History
- Founded: 1 April 1889 (Note: Became unitary authority 1 April 2009.)

Leadership
- Chair: John Beynon, Conservative since 1 May 2024
- Leader: Glen Sanderson, Conservative since 23 September 2020
- Chief Executive: Helen Paterson since 6 February 2023

Structure
- Seats: 69 councillors
- Graph of the party split among 69 seats.
- Political groups: All parties (69) Conservative (28) Reform (17) Labour (10) Liberal Democrats (3) Green (2) Independent (9)
- Joint committees: North East Combined Authority

Elections
- Voting system: First past the post
- Last election: 1 May 2025
- Next election: 3 May 2029

Meeting place
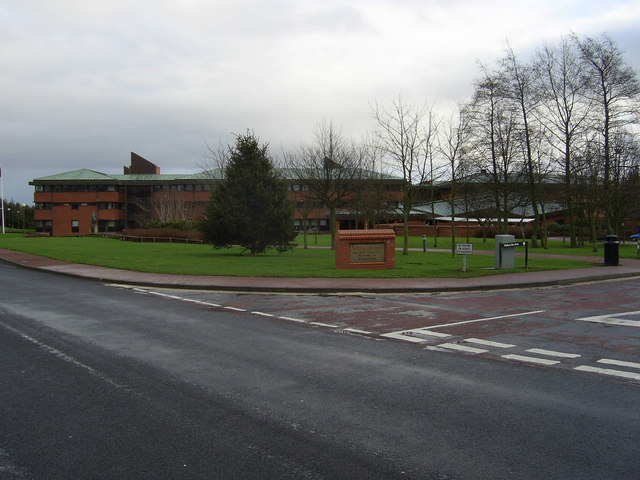
- County Hall, Morpeth, NE61 2EF

Website
- www.northumberland.gov.uk

Northumberland County Council is the local authority for the non-metropolitan county of Northumberland in North East England. Since 2009 it has been a unitary authority, having also taken over district-level functions when the county's districts were abolished.

The council has been under no overall control since 2021, being led by a Conservative minority administration. It is based at County Hall, Morpeth. Since 2024 the council has been a member of the North East Mayoral Combined Authority.

== History ==
Elected county councils were established in 1889 under the Local Government Act 1888, taking over administrative functions previously carried out by unelected magistrates at the quarter sessions. The city of Newcastle upon Tyne had been a county corporate since 1400 with its own quarter sessions, and Newcastle's independence from the county was maintained by making it a county borough. The county council was elected by and provided services to the remainder of the county, which area was termed the administrative county. Berwick-upon-Tweed was also a county corporate, but was not considered large enough to provide its own county-level services. It was therefore included in the administrative county of Northumberland. Tynemouth subsequently also became a county borough in 1904, removing it from the administrative county.

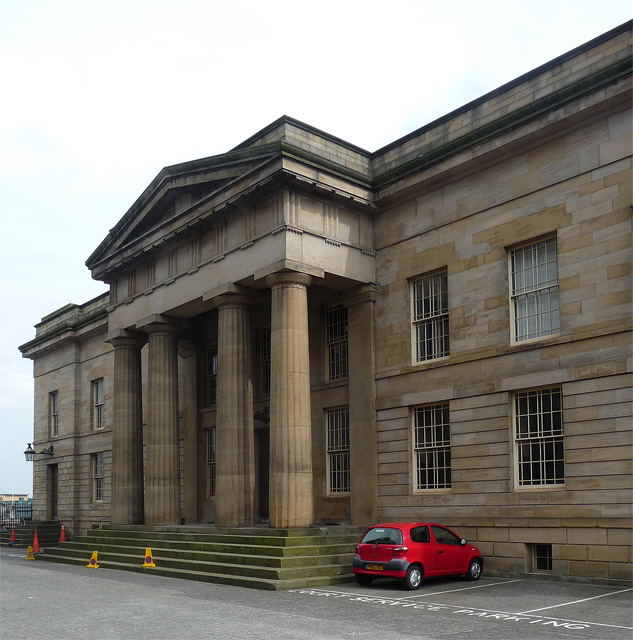
Moot Hall, Newcastle upon Tyne: Council's meeting place 1889–1981

The first elections were held in January 1889. The council formally came into being on 1 April 1889, on which day it held its first official meeting at the Moot Hall, Newcastle upon Tyne, the courthouse (built 1811) which had served as the meeting place of the quarter sessions which preceded the county council. The first chairman of the council was Matthew White Ridley, who was also the Conservative MP for Blackpool (in Lancashire).

The county was reformed in 1974, becoming a non-metropolitan county and ceding further territory around the Newcastle conurbation to the new metropolitan county of Tyne and Wear. Until 1974 the lower tier of local government comprised numerous boroughs, urban districts and rural districts. In 1974 the lower tier was reorganised and Northumberland was left with six districts: Alnwick, Berwick-upon-Tweed, Blyth Valley, Castle Morpeth, Tynedale and Wansbeck.

Until 1981 the county council met at the Moot Hall in central Newcastle, and had its main administrative offices at the adjoining County Hall. The Moot Hall area formed an exclave of the administrative county. The exclave became part of the city in 1974 and therefore outside the county council's territory. The council moved to Morpeth in 1981.

As part of the 2009 structural changes to local government in England, Northumberland's six districts were abolished and their functions were taken over by the county council. As part of the 2009 changes the council was given the option of changing its name to "Northumberland Council". After consultation with the public the council decided to keep the name "Northumberland County Council".

In 2024 a combined authority was established covering Northumberland, County Durham, Gateshead, Newcastle upon Tyne, North Tyneside, South Tyneside and Sunderland, called the North East Mayoral Combined Authority. The combined authority is chaired by the directly elected Mayor of the North East and oversees the delivery of certain strategic functions across the area.

Comparison of districts within Northumberland, 1974-2009 (left), and from 2009 (right)

== Governance ==
Since 2009, Northumberland County Council has provided both county-level and district-level services. The whole county is also covered by civil parishes, which form an additional tier of local government.

=== Political control ===
The council has been under no overall control since 2021, being led by a minority Conservative administration. At the 2021 election the Conservatives won a majority of the seats, but they lost their majority later that year following a Liberal Democrat gain in a December 2021 by-election. A Conservative minority administration continues to run the council following the 2025 election.

Political control of the council since the 1974 reforms has been as follows:

Two-tier non-metropolitan county

Party in control	Years
No overall control	1974–1981
Labour	1981–1985
No overall control	1985–1989
Labour	1989–2008
No overall control	2008–2009

Unitary authority

Party in control	Years
No overall control	2009–2021
Conservative	2021–2021
No overall control	2021–present

=== Leadership ===
Until 1979, the chairman of the council was also its political leader. In 1979 the separate position of leader of the council was created, and the chair became a more ceremonial position. The leaders since 1979 have been:

Councillor	Party	From	To
John Baxter	Conservative	1979	May 1981
Jack Thompson	Labour	20 May 1981	May 1983
Robin Birley	Labour	May 1983	12 Oct 1984
Keith Robinson	Labour	21 Nov 1984	May 1988
Ian McArthur	Liberal Democrats	May 1988	May 1989
Ian Swithenbank	Labour	May 1989	May 1998
Michael Davey	Labour	May 1998	May 2005
Bill Brooks	Labour	May 2005	2007
Peter Hillman	Labour	2007	2008
Jeff Reid	Liberal Democrats	21 May 2008	May 2013
Grant Davey	Labour	22 May 2013	May 2017
Peter Jackson	Conservative	24 May 2017	2 Sep 2020
Glen Sanderson	Conservative	23 Sep 2020	

=== Composition ===
Following the 2025 election and subsequent by-elections and changes of allegiance up to October 2026, the composition of the council was:

Party	Seats
Conservative	28
Reform	18
Labour	10
Liberal Democrats	3
Green	2
Independent	8
Total	69

Seven of the independent councillors form the "Independent Group" and the other is not aligned to any group. The next election is due in 2029.

=== Ombudsman investigations ===
Between 2022 and 2025 the Local Government and Social Care Ombudsman (LGSCO) issued annual review letters to Northumberland County Council. For the year ending 31 March 2023 the Ombudsman received 19 complaints about the council and upheld 16 of them (an 84 % uphold rate); the council complied with 100 % of the recommendations and provided a satisfactory remedy before the complaint reached the Ombudsman in four cases (25 %).

For the year ending 31 March 2024 there were 26 investigations and 18 complaints (69 %) were upheld; the council again complied with all recommendations but only two cases (11 %) were remedied before the Ombudsman’s involvement. The Ombudsman’s letter for 2024–2025, sent in May 2025 and followed up in July 2025, welcomed that the council agreed and implemented recommendations in 12 cases but expressed concern that four of those remedies were completed late and highlighted ongoing delays and poor-quality responses to Ombudsman enquiries.

== Elections ==
Since the last review of boundaries took effect for the 2025 election, Northumberland has had 69 electoral divisions, each of which elects one councillor. Elections are held every four years.

== Premises ==
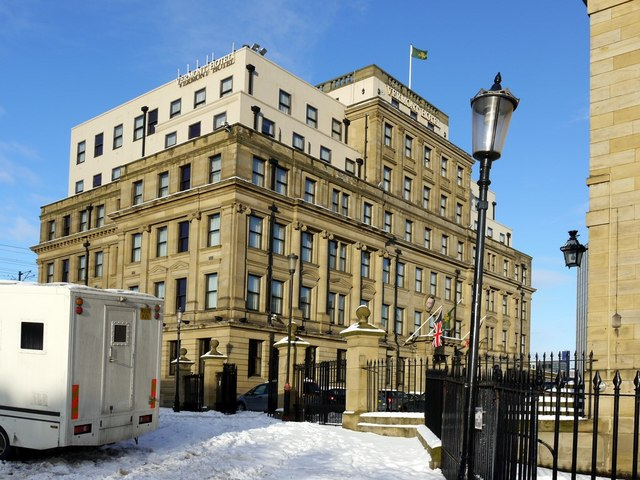
County Hall, Newcastle upon Tyne: Council's main offices 1910–1981

The council is based at County Hall on the southern outskirts of Morpeth, which was purpose-built for the council and opened in 1981. Proposals to move the council's headquarters to Ashington were considered between 2014 and 2017, with building work starting on the new site in Ashington. In 2017 work on the new site was aborted after the proposed sale of the Morpeth site fell through. The council subsequently decided to stay in Morpeth and renovate County Hall instead.

Prior to 1981 the council was based in Newcastle. Meetings were held at the Moot Hall. A large office building called County Hall was built opposite the Moot Hall in 1910 to serve as the council's main offices.
