= Gibson Street Baths =

Public baths in Newcastle upon Tyne

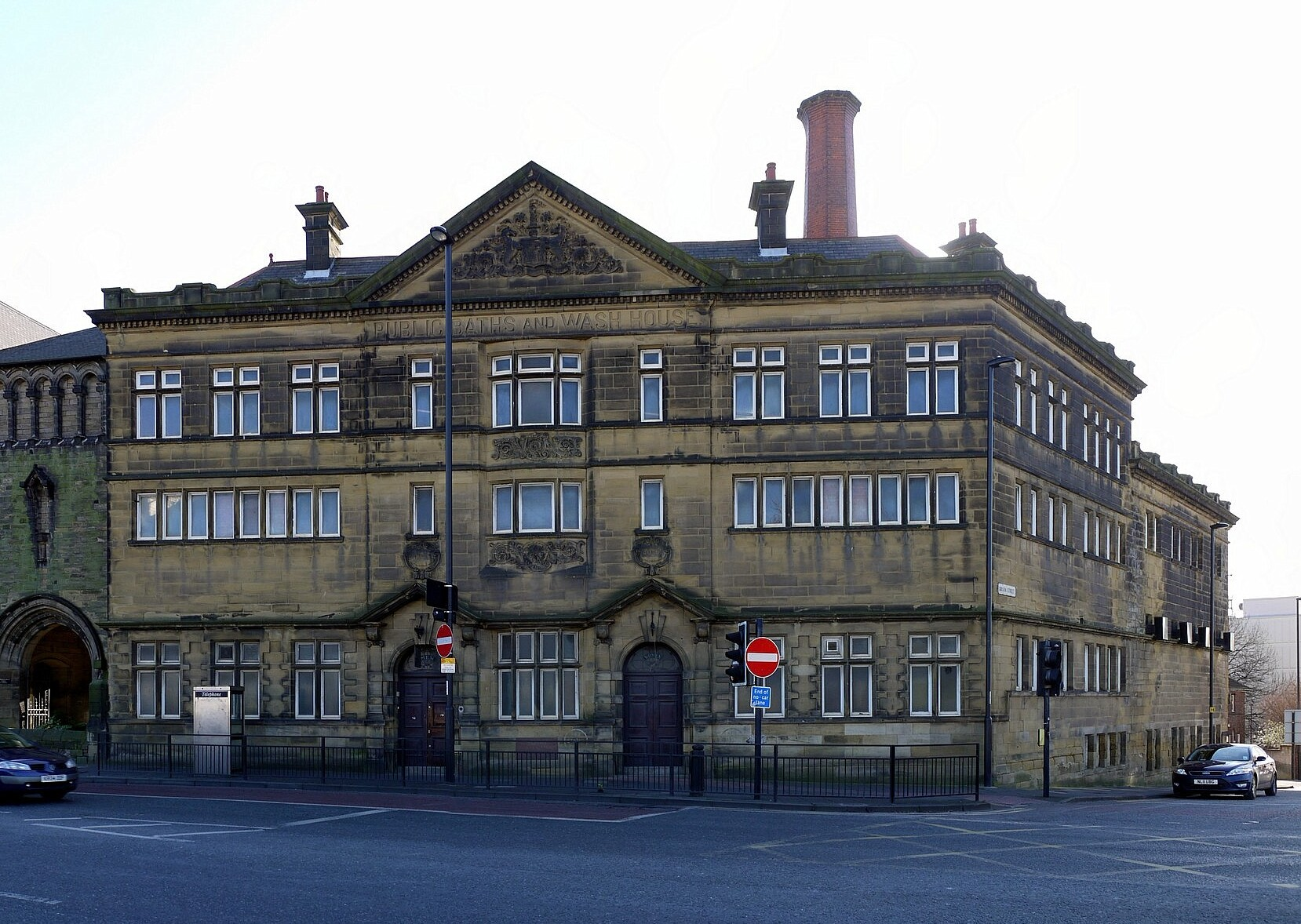
- The building in February 2012
- Interactive map of Gibson Street Baths
- Location: New Bridge Street, Newcastle upon Tyne
- Coordinates: 54.9742°N 1.5985°W
- Facilities: Swimming pool

Construction
- Opened: 1907
- Architect: Frederick H. Holford

Listed Building – Grade II
- Official name: Gibson Street Baths
- Designated: 30 March 1987
- Reference no.: 1355292

The Gibson Street Baths is a swimming and sports facility located in Newcastle upon Tyne, England. The building, which is vacant and deteriorating, is a Grade II listed building.

== History ==
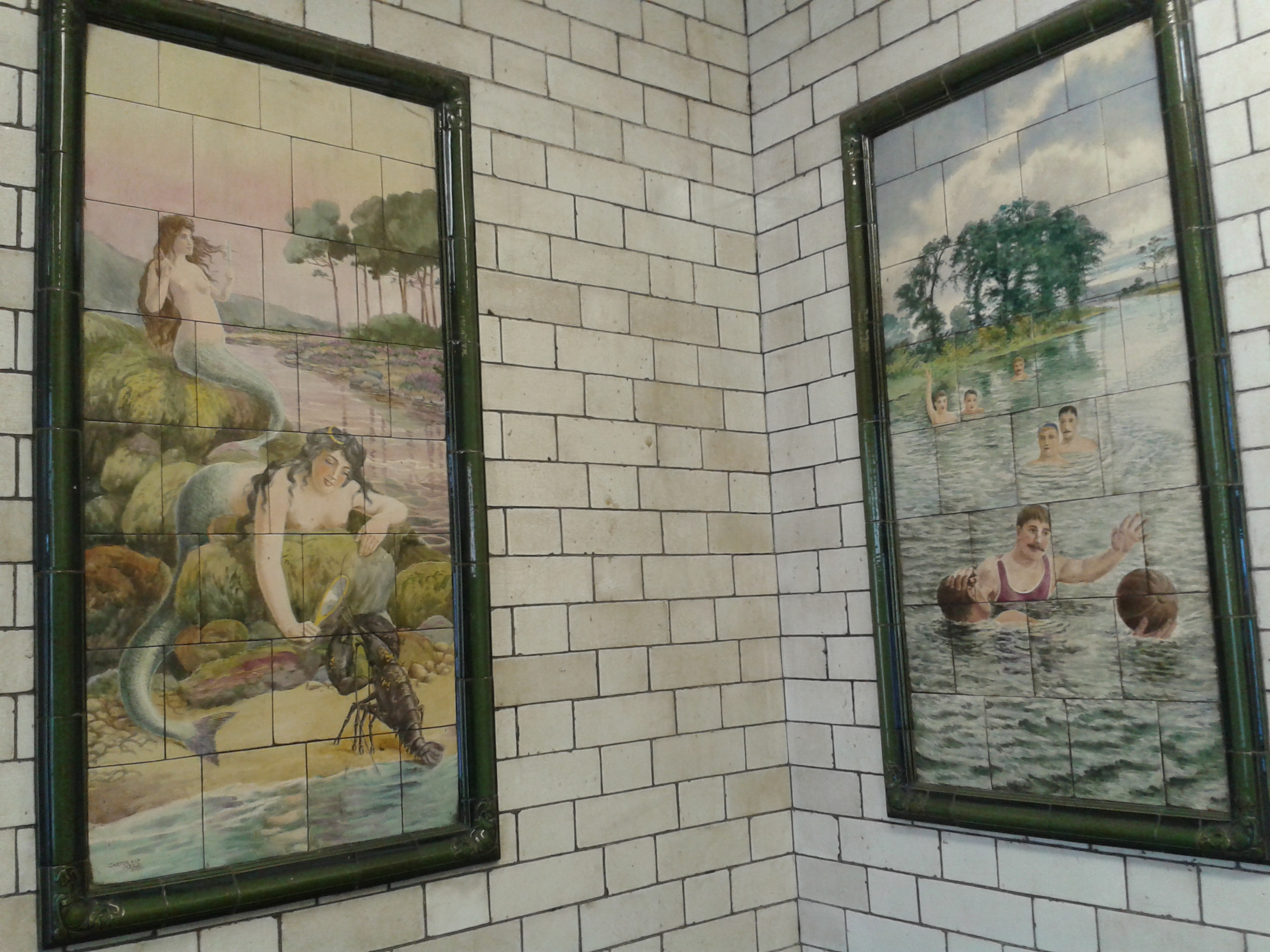
Murals inside the building

The earliest public baths in the city, the Bath Lane Baths, designed by William Craneson and since demolished, were completed in 1781. The Northumberland Baths on Northumberland Road, designed by John Dobson and also since demolished, opened in 1838, and the Gallowgate Baths, designed by Gibson Kyle and also since demolished, were completed in 1896.

Following significant population growth in the east end of the city, largely associated with the shipbuilding and armaments industry, there was demand for public baths to be erected in that area. The Gibson Street Baths and the Shipley Street Baths were both commissioned in the early 20th century, erected around the same time, and remain the oldest surviving examples of public baths in the city. While the Gibson Street Baths survive intact, the Shipley Street Baths have since been integrated into the perimeter block of the Byker Wall.

The site selected for the Gibson Street Baths was on the corner of New Bridge Street and Gibson Street on the opposite side of the road to the East Coast Main Line. The building was designed by the city surveyor, Frederick H. Holford, in the neoclassical style, built ashlar stone and was officially opened in the presence of the Olympic swimmer, John Arthur Jarvis, in 1907.

The design involved a symmetrical main frontage of nine bays facing onto New Bridge Street. The central bay featured a four-part window on the ground floor, and shallow-curved oriel windows on the first and second floors. The adjacent bays incorporated doorways (men on the left, women on the right) with mounded surrounds, keystones and triangular pediments on the ground floor, and single sash windows on the first and second floors. The outer bays were fenestrated by cross-windows on the ground floor, rows of eight windows on the first floor and cross-windows on the second floor. At roof level, there was a modillioned cornice and a central pediment with the city coat of arms in the tympanum. Internally, the main rooms were the main swimming bath and the changing rooms which incorporated murals created using finely decorated titles made by Carter & Co. depicting mermaids in the female changing area and men in swimming costumes in the male changing area. The decoration has been described by the historian, Lynn Pearson, as "without parallel".

During the Second World War, the baths were used by the fire service to provide water to extinguish fires caused by German bombing. After the war, in the context of declining use of the baths, the building was used as a badminton court.

In May 2025, the Victorian Society included the building in its list of the 10 most endangered buildings in the country.
