= County Hall, Newcastle upon Tyne =

County building in Newcastle upon Tyne, Tyne and Wear, England

County Hall
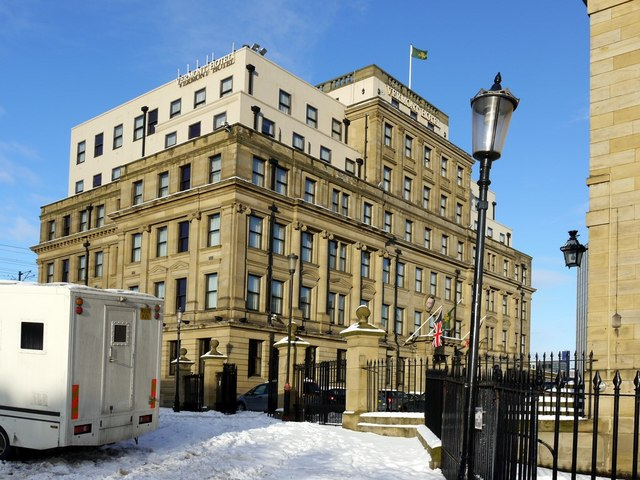

- Location within Tyne and Wear
- 54.96912°N 1.60964°W
- Location: Newcastle upon Tyne

History
- Built: 1910

Site notes
- Architect: J.A. Bain
- Architectural style: Classical style

Listed Building – Grade II
- Designated: 30 March 1987
- Reference no.: 1024938

County Hall is a former municipal building, now a hotel, in Castle Garth, in Newcastle upon Tyne, England. The county hall, which was the headquarters and meeting place of Northumberland County Council from 1910 to 1981, is a Grade II listed building.

== History ==
In the early 20th century the Moot Hall in Newcastle upon Tyne had been the local facility for dispensing justice and the meeting place of Northumberland County Council. After deciding that the old Moot Hall was inadequate for their needs, county leaders chose to procure a new county headquarters: the site selected for the new building was within the Moot Hall precincts which formed an exclave of Northumberland County inside the City and County of Newcastle upon Tyne.

The new building was designed by J. A. Bain in the classical style and completed in 1910. The design involved an asymmetrical main frontage of thirteen bays facing south east; the central section of five bays featured a porch with Doric order columns supporting a triglyph frieze on the ground floor and sash windows on each of five floors above; the left and right sections of had sections of three bays which slightly projected forwards.

An extension down to the Side and the top storeys were designed by Cackett, Burns Dick and McKellar and completed in 1933. Following the creation of the county of Tyne and Wear in 1974 the County Hall still remained extraterritorial to the county of Northumberland, and in the late 1970s Northumberland County Council decided to re-establish County Hall in Morpeth, to provide them with a meeting place within the actual territorial limits of the Northumberland county; the county council completed the move to Morpeth in April 1981.

The building in Newcastle was converted into a hotel, becoming the "Vermont Hotel" under the management of Lincoln Group in 1993. Visitors to the hotel at that time included the singer, Engelbert Humperdinck, in 2001. Meanwhile, the film, School for Seduction, starring the actress, Kelly Brook, was filmed in the hotel in 2004. After Lincoln Group went into administration in January 2012, the hotel changed ownership and was acquired by Gainford Hotels in April 2012. The television presenters, Ant & Dec, visited the hotel for a charity event in May 2015.
