= Austin Friars, Newcastle-upon-Tyne =

Friary in Newcastle upon Tyne, England

Coordinates: 54.9708°N 1.6032°W

Austin Friars, Newcastle-upon-Tyne was an Augustinian friary established in Newcastle upon Tyne, England

The friary is believed to have been founded by William Lord Ros, Baron of Wark on Tweed. In 1290 they erected a house on the east bank of the Eric Burn in Newcastle. In January 1539, the friaries of Newcastle were closed as part of the dissolution of the monasteries under Henry VIII and taken over by the Crown. In 1551, the land was granted to John Dudley, 1st Duke of Northumberland.

By 1648, the land had passed to the city council, and a series of institutions built on the site, including hospitals, prisons and guild houses. In 1681 the Holy Jesus Hospital was built partly on the site.

In the 1820s, the site was occupied by the Newcastle Gas Company, local hospitals, and the Barber Surgeon's Company, who had leased part of the land since 1648.

== Sources ==
- Charleton, Robert John (1899). A History of Newcastle upon Tyne from the earliest records to its formation as a city. London: Walter Scott Ltd.
- Middlebrook, Sydney (1968). Newcastle upon Tyne. Its Growth and Achievement. Wakefield: S.R. Publishers ltd.
- Newton, Diana; Pollard, AJ (2009). Newcastle and Gateshead before 1700. Chichester: Phillimore & Co Ltd. ISBN 978-1-86077-579-6.
