= Moot Hall, Newcastle upon Tyne =

Moot Hall
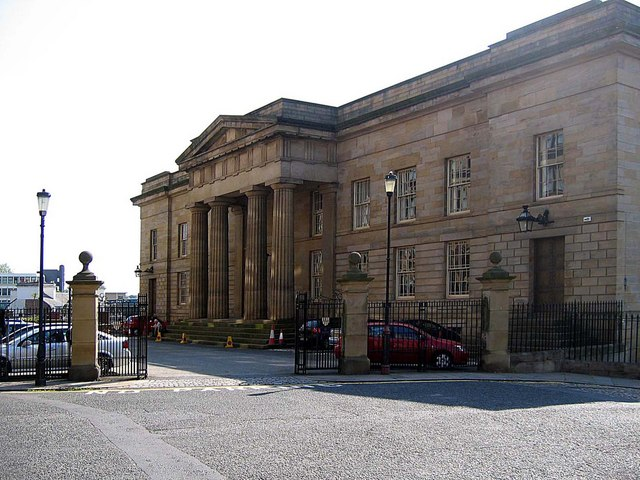

- Location within Tyne and Wear
- 54.96880°N 1.60932°W
- Location: Castle Garth, Newcastle upon Tyne NE1 1RQ

History
- Built: 1812

Site notes
- Architect: John Stokoe
- Architectural style: Greek Revival style

Listed Building – Grade I
- Designated: 17 December 1971
- Reference no.: 1116297

The Moot Hall is a former courthouse at Castle Garth in Newcastle upon Tyne, England. The structure, which overlooks the Tyne Bridge, is a Grade I listed building.

== History ==
The building was commissioned as a courthouse to replace the facilities at the Castle which were used for holding assizes and which had been condemned for their inconvenience and unhealthiness. The site selected had formed part of Pons Aelius in Roman times and two copper coins from the time of the Emperor Antoninus Pius and two Roman altars were found during preparatory work on site.

The foundation stone for the new building was laid by Earl Percy on 22 July 1810. It was designed by John Stokoe in the Greek Revival style and completed in August 1812. The design involved a symmetrical main frontage of eleven bays facing north west with the end bays slightly projected forwards; the central section of three bays featured an tetrastyle portico with Doric order columns supporting a pediment. Internally, the principal rooms were the Grand Jury room (straight ahead from the entrance), the nisi prius court (on the left) and the crown court (on the right). A significant number of cells for prisoners were created in the basement. Alterations were carried out to a design by William Crozier, Durham County Architect, in 1877.

The building continued to be used as the county facility for dispensing justice but, following the implementation of the Local Government Act 1888, which established county councils in every county, the building was also used as a meeting place for Northumberland County Council until it moved to County Hall in 1910.

An inquiry in to the loss of SS Ina Mactavish was held at the Moot Hall in December 1907 and February 1908. The trial of the then 11 year old Mary Bell for the murder of two young boys took place at Newcastle Assizes in 1968. Other notorious court cases held at the Moot Hall included the trial of Robert Black for the murder of four young girls committed between 1981 and 1986 and the trial of Albert Dryden for the murder of Harry Collinson in June 1991. The Moot Hall heard all Crown Court cases before the new combined court complex was completed on the Quayside in 1990.

== Post court use ==
After becoming licensed as a venue for civil weddings, the Moot Hall hosted its first civil wedding in September 2005.

In March 2019 Her Majesty's Courts Service decided that the building was surplus to requirements and instructed estate agents Avison Young to market it for sale. It was announced in October 2019 that the building had been acquired by the property business, Gainford Group, which also owned the Vermont Hotel, located immediately to the north of the Moot Hall. As of April 2026, Courts 1 and 2 at the Moot Hall were once again being used to hear Crown Court cases as an over-spill from new combined court complex.
