= Goodiepal =

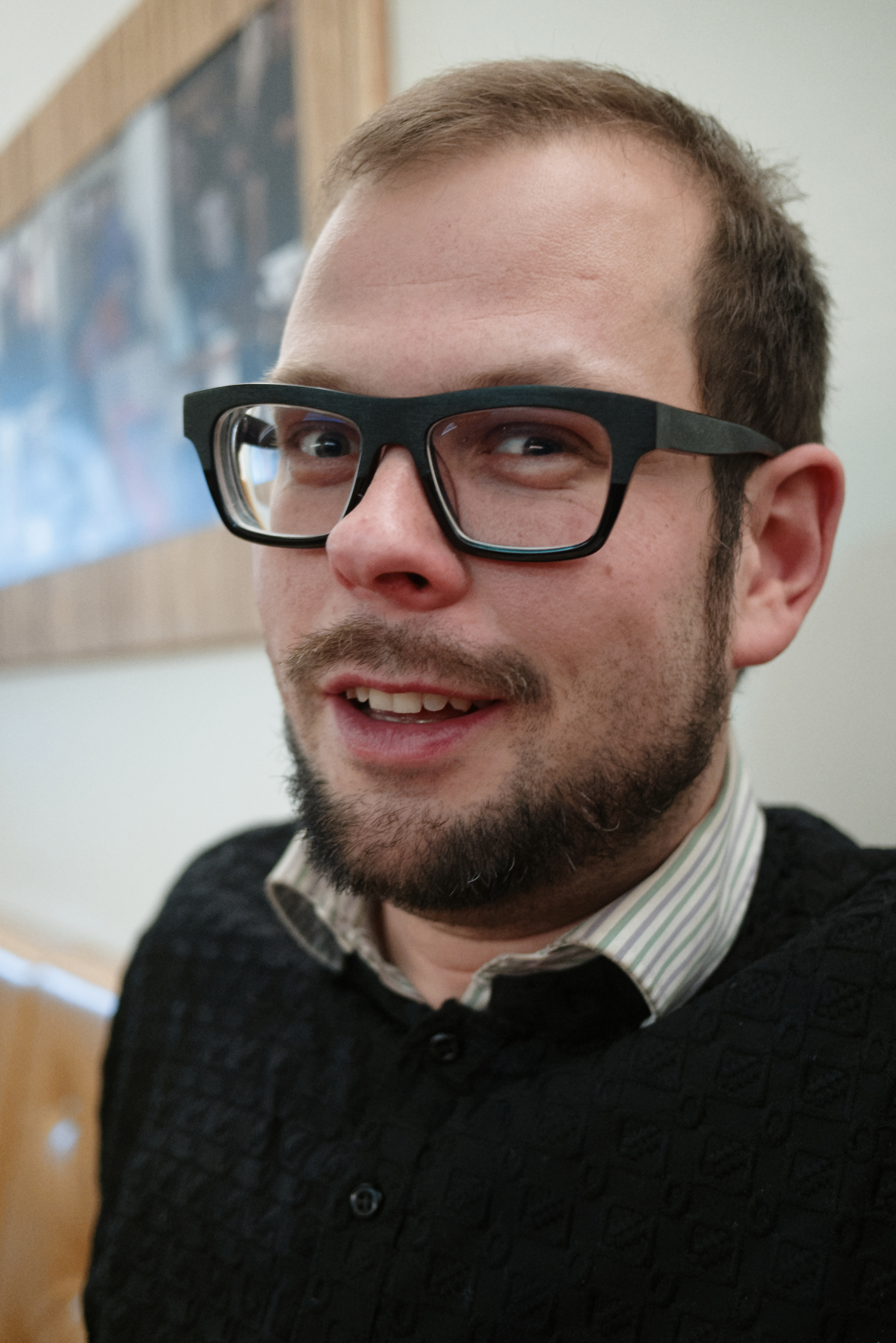

Background information
- Also known as: Gæoudji SYGNOK, Circulation of Events, DEN ÅRHUS TEKNO KRIGER, Mainpal Inv.
- Born: Parl Kristian Bjørn Vester; 1977 (age 48–49)
- Origin: Faroe Islands
- Genres: Computer music; sound art; experimental; avant-garde; protest music
- Occupations: horologist, composer, Musician, lecturer
- Years active: 1988–present
- Labels: V/Vm Test Records, Editions Mego, Fonal Records, Alku, Endless Void Surf Club
- Website: https://komponistbasen.dk/node/8812

Goodiepal or Gæoudjiparl van den Dobbelsteen, whose given name is Parl Kristian Bjørn Vester, is a Danish/Faroese experimental electronic musician, performance artist, composer and lecturer, as well as a fully educated horologist. His work engages with the past, present, and future of computer music, compositional practices and resonance computing, and his idea of Radical Computer Music. His tours have included 150 universities internationally.

In 2014, Goodiepal sold Kommunal Klon Komputer 2, a DIY velomobile that he used for personal transport, to the National Gallery of Denmark, where it is now on display.

== Biography ==
=== Early life ===
Goodiepal went to a Steiner School, where electronics were prohibited. This led to Goodiepal's participation in secret demo groups releasing demos on floppy discs for Commodore and Amiga computers, as well as experiments with UNIX and general computer coding. Goodiepal departed from the Steiner school after eight years and embarked on various activities with hacker groups in computer software programming and distribution. He began seriously making and performing music in the winter of 1986.

=== Teaching and lecturing ===
In 2002, Goodiepal gave his first lectures in the US, among other places at CalArts, Brown University and University of Iowa, on the subjects of Radical Computer Music and, similarly, radical software. In 2004 Goodiepal was hired as professor of History and Aesthetics of Electronic Music at DIEM (Danish Institute of Electro-acoustic Music), The Royal Danish Academy of Music in Aarhus, Denmark, and served as head of the electronic music department. Goodiepal also eventually taught composition at DIEM. In 2008, Goodiepal left The Royal Danish Academy of Music. Upon his resignation, he produced the declaration Five steps in a Gentleman's War on the stupidity of modern computer music and media based art, released as a supplement to the audio piece The Official Mort Aux Vaches Ekstra Extra Walkthrough and the series of images called Snappidaggs explaining the methodology behind Goodiepal's concept of Radical Computer Music. In between releases, projects, and installations, Goodiepal lectures extensively all over the world.

Since 2016 Goodiepal has been performing in a performance group, under the name GP&PLS, which includes a diverse set of members including his partner Nynne Roberta Pedersen, Danish actress Rosalinde Mynster, poet Lars Skinnebach, and the American artist Jeffrey Alan Scudder. Their intent as a group is to create protest music, while helping and donating to refugees during the ongoing European migrant crisis.

== Selected works ==
=== Mort Aux Vaches Ekstra Extra ===
In 2002, Goodiepal created a compositional musical language, based around 'musical bricks'. This language was then developed into the Mort Aux Vaches Ekstra Extra compositional game scenario.

Mort Aux Vaches Ekstra Extra was performed as a lecture at Gallery Andersen Contemporary, Copenhagen, Denmark in 2007 and the 5th Berlin Biennale for Contemporary Art, 2008. The game scenario of the lecture is an exercise in the creation of musical scores to challenge the mindset of 'other' intelligences, considering issues such as utopia, time, notation techniques, language, artificial intelligence, 'unscannability' (being undetected by technology), and the role of the composer.

=== Circus Pentium ===
Goodiepal went on to participate in the installation Circus Pentium by Danish artist Henrik Plenge Jakobsen opening at Statens Museum for Kunst, Copenhagen, Denmark, also in 2004. The work comprised a circus installation with Goodiepal playing the lute alongside other actors and was also shown at Art Basel, Switzerland, and Stedelijk Museum in Amsterdam, Netherlands.

=== EuroBOT ===
Goodiepal has consistently kept up performances of a game piece titled 'EuroBOT', as well as classes on 'EuroBOT mythology'. In practice, EuroBOT is akin to a board game or a tabletop role-playing game, with polygonal shapes and figures representing planets. Performances of EuroBOT are characterized by Goodiepal whistling the musical score. In 2008, he performed EuroBOT on the Danish talkshow Den 11. time, which he also composed the opening theme for.

=== The Autonomous Music School ===
In 2007, Goodiepal opened an autonomous school on the first floor of The Blue House in London, designed by FAT Architecture, for people interested in Radical Computer Music and other of his arts. The school, open from 9 am to 10:10 am every weekday, was free of charge.

=== EMEGO 211 ===
In 2016, Goodiepal released an album on Editions Mego entitled EMEGO 211, using the Wikimedia Commons as the device of dissemination, which also thereby released the album into the public domain.

== Books ==
- Goodiepal & ALKU. El Camino del Hardcore - Rejsen Til Nordens Indre. 2012.
- Radical Computer Music & Fantastisk Medie Manipulation. Co-published with Pork Salad Press. 2009. ISBN 978-1-934399-12-5.

== Audio releases ==
- Goodiepal - Morx Aux Vaches, CD, Morx Aux Vaches, 2005
- Goodiepal/Misaki Kawai - 24 Advertisements - CD, Pork Salad press, 2012
- Goddiepla - Battlefleet Gothic/Live at Roskilde 200, 2xLP, Fonal, 2014
- Goodiepal - Morendo Morendo/My Paris Is Called Colchester, 3xLP, Editions Mego, 2014
- Goodiepal - Untitled, LP, EMEGO, 2016
- GP&PLS - Pro-monarkist Extratone, LP, Goodiepal, 2017
- Goodiepal - The Goodiepal Equation Original Soundtrack With Appendix, 4xLP, Fonal, 2018
- Jonathan Meese/Family Fodder/Kommissar Hjuler/Mama Baer/GP&PLS - Die Aberkennung als Beleuchtungstraeger, LP, Psych.KG, 2019
- Kommissar Hjuler/Goodiepal and GP&PLS - Jemand vergraebt Erdaushub, LP, Psych.KG, 2019
- Kommissar Hjuler/Mama Baer/GP&PLS - The European Impro Fascism, LP, Psych.KG, 2019
- Kommissar Hjuler/Mama Baer/GP&PLS - Osteskære SIF / Hujan Putting, MC, Bawah Tanah Rekod, 2020
- Kommissar Hjuler/Mama Baer/GP&PLS - Kommissar Hjuler wird belohnt, 7inch, (SHMF), 2022
- Kommissar Hjuler/Mama Baer/GP&PLS - Das Snorkfräulein wird bestraft, 7inch, (SHMF), 2022
- Kommissar Hjuler/Mama Baer/GP&PLS - Arwen Gold, 7inch, (SHMF), 2022
- Kommissar Hjuler/Mama Baer/GP&PLS - Arwen Gold (II), 7inch, (SHMF), 2022
- Kommissar Hjuler/Mama Baer/GP&PLS - Jessa Rhodes, 7inch, (SHMF), 2022
- Anny Franny - S.V.H.O.N., 2023
- Kommissar Hjuler/Mert Akyürek/Bananskolen - Alex Grey, 7inch, (SHMF), 2023
- Kommissar Hjuler/Mama Baer/Bananskolen - Loren Minardi, 7inch, (SHMF), 2023
- Kommissar Hjuler/Mama Baer/GP&PLS - Anita Bellini, 7inch & porn magazine, (SHMF), 2023
- Kommissar Hjuler & Lt. Caramel/Goodiepal - Tiffani Tatum -zwei-, 7inch & porn magazine, (SHMF), 2023
- Kommissar Hjuler/Family Fodder/Goodiepal & Bananskolen - ... play Deathcrush (by Mayhem), 12inch, (SHMF), 2023
- Kommissar Hjuler/Mama Baer & Lt. Caramel/W. Kasahara/Goodiepal - Tiffani Tatum -drei-, 7inch & porn magazine, (SHMF), 2023
- Kommissar Hjuler/Goodiepal - Anal Sex no. 1 - the kitchen, 7inch & porn magazine, (SHMF), 2023
- Kommissar Hjuler/Goodiepal - Anal Sex no. 3 - the kitchen, 7inch & porn magazine, (SHMF), 2023
- Mama Baer/Goodiepal - Anal Sex no. 4 - the cow girl, 7inch & porn magazine, (SHMF), 2023
- Kommissar Hjuler/Mama Baer & Lt. Caramel/Goodiepal - Lorena Garcia/Sabrisse Aaliyah, 7inch & porn magazine, (SHMF), 2023
- Kommissar Hjuler/Mama Baer/Goodiepal - Leyla Peachbloom, 7inch & porn magazine, (SHMF), 2024
- Kommissar Hjuler/Goodiepal - Anal Sex no. 5 - the kitchen, 7inch & porn magazine, (SHMF), 2024
- Kommissar Hjuler/Mama Baer/Goodiepal - Lina Luxa, 7inch & porn magazine, (SHMF), 2024
- Kommissar Hjuler/Goodiepal - Malmlund Outtakes, 7inch & porn magazine, (SHMF), 2024
- Kommissar Hjuler/GP+Pls - red fox Michelle H., 7inch & porn magazine, (SHMF), 2024
- Kommissar Hjuler/GP+Pls - Myra Glasford, 7inch & porn magazine, (SHMF), 2024
- Kommissar Hjuler/Goodiepal - Evelyn Neill, 7inch & porn magazine, (SHMF), 2024
- Kommissar Hjuler/Goodiepal - double penetration, 7inch & porn magazine, (SHMF), 2024
- Kommissar Hjuler/Goodiepal - Susan Ayn, 7inch & porn magazine, (SHMF), 2024
- Kommissar Hjuler/Goodiepal - blowjob +/-, 7inch & porn magazine, (SHMF), 2024
- Kommissar Hjuler/Goodiepal - Shrima Malati, 7inch & porn magazine, (SHMF), 2024
- Mama Baer/Goodiepal - Anna Taylor, 7inch & porn magazine, (SHMF), 2025
- Kommissar Hjuler/Mama Baer/Lt. Caramel & J. Kruml/Goodiepal & Galls - WOMAN 12, 7inch, Ed. Amt Eisenberg, 2025
- Kommissar Hjuler/Mama Baer/Goodiepal - Alex Grey, 7inch & porn magazine, (SHMF), 2025
- Kommissar Hjuler/Mama Baer/Goodiepal - Cayenne Klein & Alexis Crystal, 7inch & porn magazine, (SHMF), 2024
- Mama Baer/Goodiepal - Alexis Crystal & Cayenne Klein, 7inch & porn magazine, (SHMF), 2025
- Mama Baer/Goodiepal - Total Sex, 10inch & artwork by Kommissar Hjuler, (SHMF), 2025
- Goodiepal & Galls + Mainpal Inv. - Skype, 7inch (Endless Void Surf Club), 2025
- Goodiepal & Gal(l)s / Various - Danske Folk Pytel: 100th Flea Special, 2CD set (Flea Market), 2025

== Honors ==
- Narc Beacon was awarded an honourable mention at the Ars Electronica Festival in Linz, Austria, in 2002.
- In 2005, Goodiepal was commissioned by the Nordic Council of Ministers to create a sound piece representing Norway, Denmark, Sweden, Iceland, and Greenland at the World Expo 2005 in Aichi, Japan. The result was a generative computer music program playing Goodiepal music through countless speakers in three exhibition spaces in the exhibition's Nordic pavilion.
- Mort Aux Vaches Ekstra Extra was presented at the 5th Berlin Biennale for Contemporary Art, 2008.
- On 27 October 2008, Goodiepal received a first class merit certificate at StoryTellerScotland. He is now officially allowed to call himself a Master Storyteller of the highest accord in the UK.
- In November 2010, Goodiepal received the Danish Heinrich Prize at Den Grå Hal, Christiania, for his war on the Royal Academy of Music.
