= Briggflatts =

1966 long poem by Basil Bunting

Briggflatts is a long poem by Basil Bunting published in 1966. The work is subtitled "An Autobiography". The title "Briggflatts" comes from the name of Brigflatts Meeting House (spelled with one "g" in Quaker circles), a Quaker Friends meeting house near Sedbergh in Cumbria, England. Bunting visited Brigflatts as a schoolboy when the family of one of his schoolfriends lived there, and it was at this time that he developed a strong attachment to his friend's sister, Peggy Greenbank, to whom the poem is dedicated. It was first read in public on 22 December 1965 in the medieval Morden Tower, part of Newcastle town wall, and published in 1966 by Fulcrum Press. Bunting also wrote another poem with "Briggflatts" in its title, the short work "At Briggflatts meetinghouse" (1975).

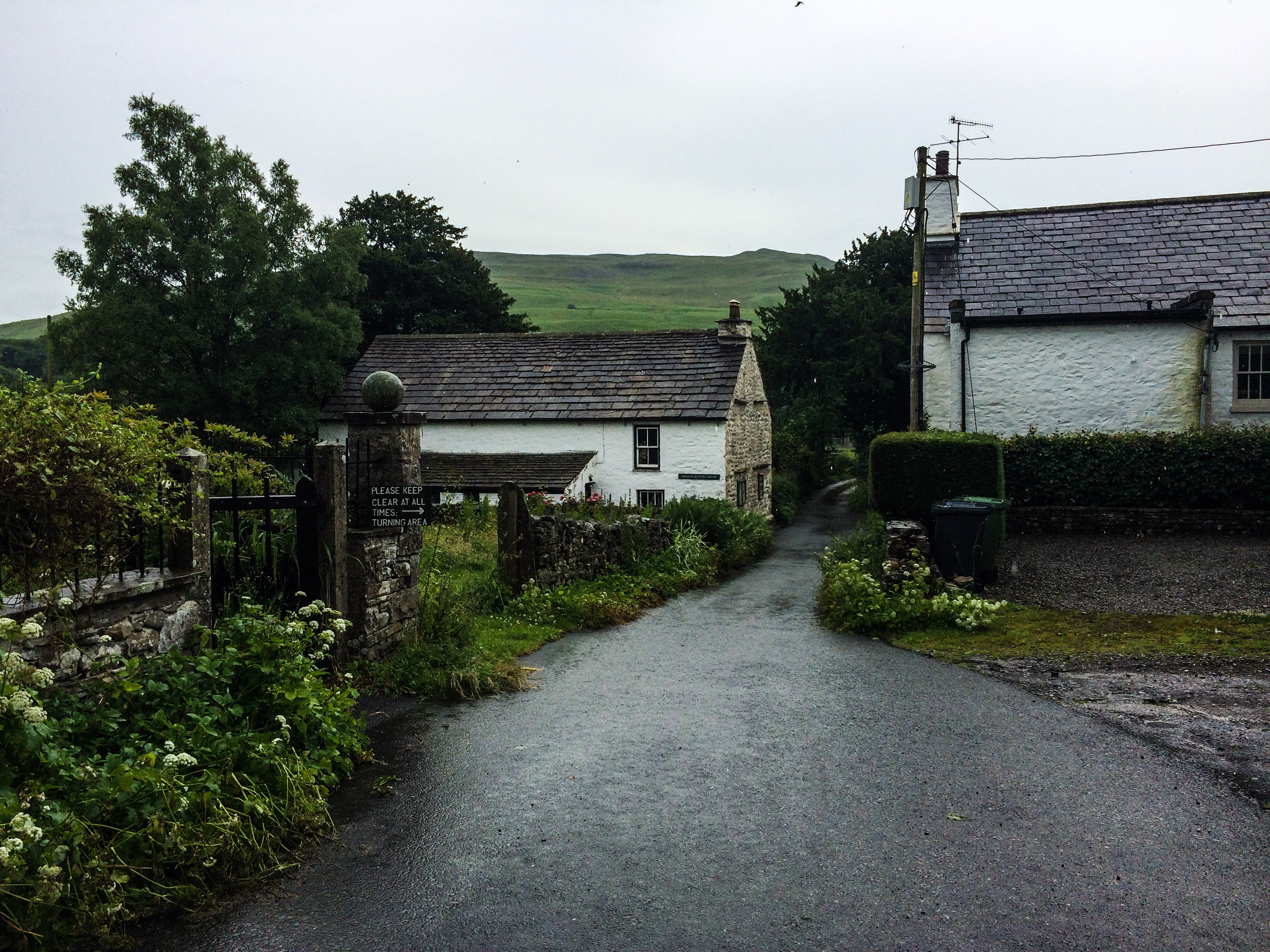
Looking south down Brigflatts Lane. The Quaker Meeting House is the building on the left.

== The poem ==
The poem begins with an epigraph reading: "The spuggies are fledged". The text contains a note explaining that the word means "little sparrows" in a north-east dialect. The poem itself has a five-part structure. The first part has a regular structure of 12 stanzas each containing 13 lines. In the following four parts the stanzas vary in length from couplets to quatrains to stanzas of more than 20 lines. The rhyme scheme also changes throughout the poem as the bulk of the text appears in free verse while other lines do contain rhyming patterns.

The poem is noted for its use of sound. Bunting believed that the essential element of poetry is the sound, and that if the sound is right, the listener will hear, enjoy and be moved; and that there may be no need for further explanation:

Poetry, like music, is to be heard. It deals in sound—long sounds and short sounds, heavy beats and light beats, the tone relations of the vowels, the relations of consonants to one another which are like instrumental colour in music. Poetry lies dead on the page until some voice brings it to life, just as music on the stave is no more than instructions to the player. A skilled musician can imagine the sound, more or less, and a skilled reader can try to hear, mentally, what his eyes see in print: but nothing will satisfy either of them till his ears hear it as real sound in the air. Poetry must be read aloud.

== Critical response ==
The poem was hailed as the successor to Ezra Pound’s Cantos and T.S. Eliot’s Four Quartets by influential critics, including Thom Gunn and Cyril Connolly, and in the US it was taken up by a younger generation of poets, such as Robert Creeley and Allen Ginsberg. However, the positive reviews did not immediately translate to more general recognition by the wider reading public.

Mark Rudman suggests that Briggflatts is an example of how free verse can be seen as an advance on traditional metrical poetry. He cites the poem to show that free verse can include a rhyme scheme without following other conventions of traditional English poetry. To Rudman, the poem allows the subject to dictate the rhyming words and argues that the "solemn mallet" is allowed to change the patterns of speech in the poetry to meet with the themes discussed in the text.

In 2009 Bloodaxe published an edition of Briggflatts that included an audio recording Bunting made in 1967, and a DVD of Peter Bell's 1982 film portrait of the poet. Faber and Faber published the first critical edition in 2016, marking the poem's fiftieth birthday.

== Reviews ==
Nicholson, Colin E. (1980), review of Basil Bunting reads Briggflatts, in Cencrastus No. 4, Winter 1980–81, p. 45, ISSN 0264-0856
