= Chinatown, Newcastle =

Neighbourhood in Newcastle upon Tyne, England

Coordinates: 54.9723°N 1.6202°W

Newcastle Chinatown
- Traditional Chinese: 紐卡素唐人街
- Simplified Chinese: 纽卡素唐人街
Transcriptions
Standard Mandarin
- Hanyu Pinyin: Niǔkǎsù Tángrénjiē
Yue: Cantonese
- Yale Romanization: náu kā sòu tòhng yàhn gāai
- Jyutping: nau^{2} kaa^{1} sou^{3} tong^{4} jan^{4} gaai^{1}

Alternative Chinese name
- Traditional Chinese: 紐卡斯爾唐人街
- Simplified Chinese: 纽卡斯尔唐人街
Transcriptions
Standard Mandarin
- Hanyu Pinyin: Niǔkǎsī'ěr Tángrénjiē
Yue: Cantonese
- Yale Romanization: náu kā sī yíh tòhng yàhn gāai
- Jyutping: nau^{2} kaa^{1} si^{1} ji^{5} tong^{4} jan^{4} gaai^{1}

The Chinatown in Newcastle is a district of Newcastle upon Tyne, located in the west of the city, on the edge of the shopping and commercial centre, along Stowell Street. It is one of five Chinatowns in England, with the other four being in London, Birmingham, Manchester, and Liverpool.

== Location ==
The Chinatown lies within the historic heart of Newcastle, Grainger Town, on land that was once part of Blackfriars monastery. The main street of the Chinatown is Stowell Street, with 唐人街 ("Chinatown") written on street signs to indicate this. Stowell Street and one of the few still extant stretches of Newcastle town wall mark the northeast boundary of the district. At the north end of Stowell Street on St Andrew's Street is the Chinese arch, facing St James' Park. South and west of Stowell Street, on the streets and passages around Blackfriars and The Gate including Charlotte Square and Low Friar Street, are a number of other businesses including restaurants, food shops and cafés.

== History ==
The first Chinese restaurant in Newcastle, the Marlborough Café, opened on Scotswood Road in 1949. Another fourteen restaurants opened up to 1962, but none on Stowell Street. The first business to open there was a Chinese supermarket, now the Wing Hong store, which moved to Stowell Street from Westgate Road in 1978, to be followed by many other businesses. In 1988 businesses along Stowell Street were allowed to have signs in Chinese as well as English. 22 Chinese style lanterns were installed in Stowell Street to replace the existing street lights in 2008.

The arch at Chinatown, Newcastle, looking out towards St James' Park

== Chinese arch ==
A Chinese arch, built in 2004 by Shanghai craftsmen, stands 11m tall on St. Andrews Street, at the northernmost extent of the Chinatown, flanked by two Chinese guardian lions and facing St James' Park football stadium.

== Events ==
Lunar New Year is celebrated in and around Chinatown every year, usually on a day in late January or early February. In 2015 this took place on 22 February.

== Gallery ==
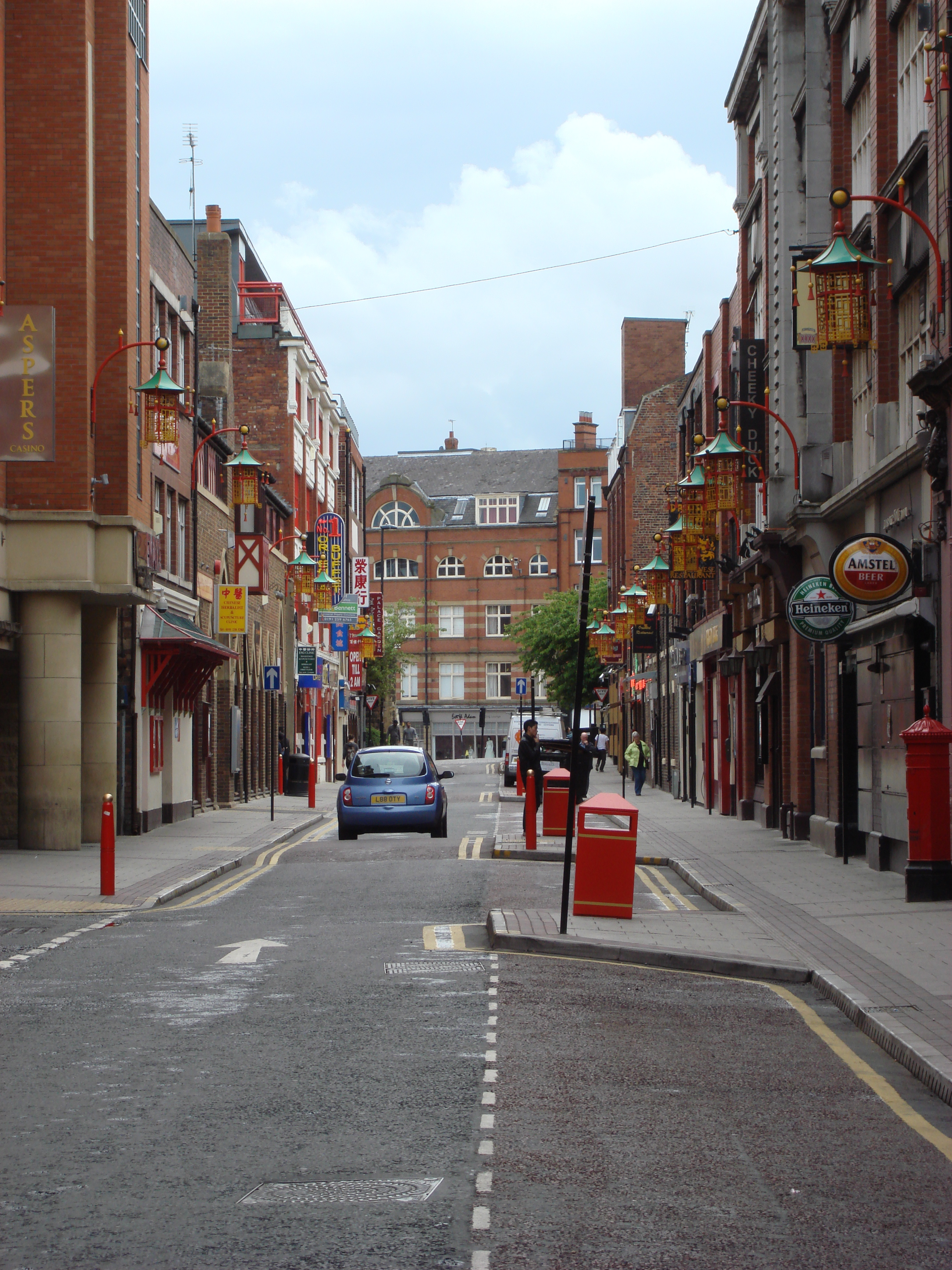
Looking along Stowell Street.

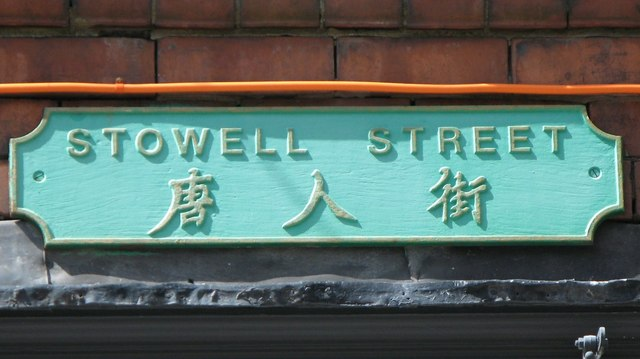
A street sign.

== See also ==
- Morden Tower
