= Ryan Choi (musician) =

- Born: December 2, 1984 (age 41); Honolulu, Hawai'i, United States
- Genres: Experimental, Free improvisation, Avant garde, Contemporary classical
- Occupations: Composer, musician, producer
- Instruments: Ukulele, bass, percussion, piano, computer
- Years active: 2010s–present
- Website: www.ryanckchoi.com

Ryan Choi (born December 2, 1984, in Honolulu, Hawai'i) is a composer and multi-instrumentalist.

== Biography ==
Choi was classically trained on the double bass from an early age and took up the ukulele in high school. Self-taught as a composer, he first came to international recognition for a series of releases for the baritone ukulele that were among the first to showcase the instrument's avant-garde potential. His debut album, Three Dancers, created after a years-long absence from music, won the 2016 Independent Music Award for Best Instrumental EP and featured the composer on prepared baritone ukulele, percussion and electronics. His work, favoring improvisation and experimentation, is often dense, intricate, and mathematically complex, utilizing advanced harmony and drawing on a range of visual, literary, and musical sources. He also makes extensive use of preparations and alternative tunings. He has collaborated with Kommissar Hjuler and Mama Baer. He lives and works in Honolulu, Hawai'i.

== Discography ==
=== Solo ===
- "Three Dancers" (2016)
- "Whenmill" (2016)

=== Collaborations ===
- "Company / Arbors" (2016) with Kommissar Hjuler and Mama Baer
- "IT-FIGURES" (2017) with Kommissar Hjuler and Mama Baer

=== Compilations ===
- "30" (2015)
- "I Never Meta Guitar Four" (2017), compiled by Elliott Sharp, on Clean Feed Records
- "Various - FLUXUS" (2017), Psych.KG
