= Cuddly Toys =

English rock band

- Also known as: Raped
- Origin: Ireland / London
- Genres: Post-punk; glam rock; new wave; art punk
- Years active: 1977–1992
- Labels: Parole, Teichiku, Orinoko, CDS Eire Fresh, Jungle Records
- Past members: Sean Purcell; Faebhean Kwest; Billy Surgeoner; Tony Baggett; Paddy Phield; Kassy Andrews; Terry Noakes; Robert Barker; S. Paul Wilson; David Kovacevic

Cuddly Toys were a rock band from London that grew out of the band Raped.

== History ==
The punk band Raped formed in 1976 with a line-up of Sean Purcell (vocals), Faebhean Kwest (guitar), Tony Baggett (bass), and Paddy Phield (drums). They released the Pretty Paedophiles EP and the "Cheap Night Out" single in 1978 on Parole Records. Their last gig as 'Raped' was in Belfast with the punk band Rudi at Christmas 1978. In January 1979 they changed their name to 'Cuddly Toys'.

The band's first release was the single "Madman", a song written by Steve Harley and Marc Bolan (with contributions from David Bowie), which reached No. 19 in the UK Indie Chart in 1980. Bolan offered to manage the band but died before doing so. They were eventually managed by Kendo Nagasaki.

On the first recording sessions as Cuddly Toys (later to appear on the album Guillotine Theatre), they were augmented by Alig Fodder and Nicky Brockway (piano). Billy Surgeoner then joined the band for further album sessions as well as live appearances, playing keyboard synthesisers.

They next released the Guillotine Theatre album in 1979 on Japanese label Teichiku, and a remixed version issued in the UK in 1980 on Fresh Records, which reached No. 1 in the indie album chart and 8 in the main billboard charts. The album was described by Dave Thompson, in a review for AllMusic, as "one of the underrated classics of the late 1970s, as delivered by one of the most underrated bands". The band continued with various personnel changes through until 1987.

The line-up of Cuddly Toys started evolving at the time of the sessions for the "Someone's Crying" 7" & 12" EP. They then recorded the Trials and Crosses album, initially still with original bassist Tony Baggett, but he left almost immediately being replaced by Paul Wilson on bass, completing the full line-up change. Sean who was half Irish died in Ireland in 1996 from a brain tumour.

Guillotine Theatre has been reissued on CD with extra tracks together with a DVD including video promos. Trials and Crosses has been reissued on CD together with an extra disc of previously unreleased recordings. Both releases are on Jungle Records.

== Later projects ==
- Fodder went on to form Family Fodder.
- Sean Purcell released a single together with Phil Pickering of Webcore under the name Goat.
- Billy Surgeoner played in Pink Fraud, a Pink Floyd tribute band, from 2003 to 2009.
- In 2016 Paddy Phield returned to Japan and formed Cuddly ToyZ to mark the 20th anniversary of Sean Purcell's death. The band only intended to play one show but were encouraged to continue. They have supported Doctors of Madness and Sylvain Sylvain amongst others.
- David Kovacevic went on to record with Killing Joke and Then Jerico.
- Kassy Andrews has continued to perform, including with Brian Connolly formerly of The Sweet.

== Discography ==
=== Raped ===
==== Albums (compilations) ====
- Philes and Smiles (1984) Iguana
- The Complete Raped Collection (1994) Anagram

==== Singles ====
- Pretty Paedophiles EP (1978) Parole
- "Cheap Night Out" (1978) Parole

=== Cuddly Toys ===
==== Albums ====
- Guillotine Theatre (1979) Teichiku (Japan)/(1980) Fresh (UK Indie No. 11)
- Trials and Crosses (1982) Fresh
- The Best of the Cuddly Toys (compilation) (2001) Cherry Red

==== Singles ====
- "Madman" (1979) Teichiku (Japan)
- "Madman" (1980) Fresh (UK Indie No. 19)
- "Astral Joe" (1980) Fresh
- "Someone's Crying" (1981) Fresh
- "It's a Shame" (1982) Fresh
