= Fresh Records =

Fresh Records has been the name of at least two different record labels in the 20th century:

- Fresh Records (US) - a US-based company
- Fresh Records (UK) - a UK-based company

== See also ==
- Minty Fresh Records
