= Monkey Banana Kitchen =

Studio album by Family Fodder
- Released: 1980
- Length: 45:39
- Language: English, French, German
- Label: Fresh

Family Fodder chronology
Sunday Girls (1979)	Monkey Banana Kitchen (1980)	All Styles (1983)

Monkey Banana Kitchen is an album by English rock band Family Fodder, released in 1980 by record label Fresh Records.

== Critical reception ==
Professional ratings
Review scores
Source	Rating
AllMusic	3/5 stars
Record Collector	4/5 stars
Trouser Press	favourable

Trouser Press wrote: "Remarkable and great fun, it's a record that will keep you on the edge of your seat."

== Legacy ==
Monkey Banana Kitchen was included on The Wire's list "100 Records That Set the World on Fire (While No One Was Listening)".

== Track listing ==
Side A (Monkey Banana Kitchen)
No.	Title	Music	Length
1.	"Darling"	Hill, Pearce, Carter	1:23
2.	"Symbols"	Harrison, Pearce, Fiedorowicz	5:28
3.	"Savoir Faire"	Pearce, Levillain	3:16
4.	"Cold Wars"	Pearce	3:42
5.	"Monkey"	Hill, Pearce, Carter, Wilson, Hobbes	6:18
6.	"Wrong"	Pearce	2:00

Side B (Vulnerable Moments)
No.	Title	Music	Length
1.	"Organ Grinder" (an adaptation of "Der Leiermann" from Schubert's Winterreise)	Franz Schubert (arranged by Fiedorowicz)	4:50
2.	"Love Song"	Pearce	2:00
3.	"Bass Adds Bass"	Hill, Harrison	5:22
4.	"Philosophy"	Pearce	3:04
5.	"Cerf Volant"	Pearce, Levillain	5:06
6.	"Banana"	Hill, Pearce, Carter, Wilson, Hobbes	3:10
Total length:			45:39
