= Madman (Cuddly Toys song) =

1979 song by Cuddly Toys

Single by Cuddly Toys

from the album Guillotine Theatre
- B-side: "Join the Girls"
- Released: 1979
- Length: 3:13
- Label: Fresh
- Songwriter(s): David Bowie; Marc Bolan; Steve Harley (uncredited)
- Producer(s): Cuddly Toys

Cuddly Toys singles chronology
"Madman" (1979)	"Astral Joe" (1980)

"Madman" is a song by the new wave band Cuddly Toys, which was released in Japan in 1979 and in the UK in 1980 as the lead single from their debut studio album Guillotine Theatre. The song, dating to 1976–77, originated as a composition by Steve Harley and Marc Bolan, with later contributions by David Bowie. Cuddly Toys' version of the song reached number 19 in the UK Independent Singles Chart in July 1980.

== Writing ==
"Madman" originated as one of a number of unfinished informal collaborations between Steve Harley and Marc Bolan in 1976–77. The pair met in 1975 and were close friends up until Bolan's death in 1977. On a number of occasions, Bolan would visit Harley at his flat in Landward Court, London, and they would spend the evening and early hours of the morning writing and playing. Harley recalled in 2019, "I have cassettes of us together, just writing, playing – 3am, guitars, cocaine and Rémy Martin. One of the songs we were working on was called 'Madman'." According to Harley, Bolan came up with the song's riff.

In early March 1977, David Bowie was on a UK tour with Iggy Pop when he stayed at Bolan's house at Upper Richmond Road West, London for a few days. The pair worked on new material together, including "Madman", and recorded some rough demos of the tracks. In September 1977, prior to Bowie's appearance on an episode of Bolan's TV series Marc, the pair spent some more time working on some of their tracks, but they were never completed and Bolan then died in a car crash later in the month. In regards to Bolan and Bowie's work on the song, Harley told Smiler in 1997, "David didn't hear mine and Marc's work, but Marc clearly went away and did it with David, as well as with me." He added in 2019, "David probably visited and Marc would have said, 'Hey, listen man, I've got this new song!' He wouldn't have said I started it. He wasn't dishonest, [just] always living on Fantasy Island. He had no sense of reality, bless him."

== Recording ==
At a time when Cuddly Toys were called Raped, the band's guitarist Faebhean Kwest was sharing a flat in London with the two men responsible for running the original T. Rex fan club. They introduced the band to Bolan and in turn he expressed an interest in managing them. He also gave them a demo tape containing rough recordings of him, Bowie and Gloria Jones. Kwest recalled in 2000, "[The tape] is truly dreadful but me and [vocalist] Sean Purcell took a few of the numbers, polished them and hence the single 'Madman'." Cuddly Toys recorded their version of the track at Kingsway Recorders in March 1979.

== Critical reception ==
On its release as a single in the UK in 1980, Paul Du Noyer of New Musical Express praised "Madman" as a "good song" with "stark, sombre drama". He felt Cuddly Toys "handle [the song] adequately, if rather derivatively", with its treatment "leaning heavily towards Bowie". As the band's UK debut, Du Noyer considered it "something of a coup" and an "impressive start" for the Cuddly Toys, but questioned whether their own material would live up to "Madman". Simon Ludgate of Record Mirror wrote, "Peter Poser and Marion Mental clash head on... David Bowie appears clutching a copy of Aladdin Sane. I am sick. Everyone laughs at bozos who go by the name of Cuddly Toys."

== Track listing ==
7-inch single (Japan, 1979)

1. "Madman" – 3:13
2. "Guillotine Theatre" – 3:58

7-inch single (UK, 1980)

1. "Madman" – 3:04
2. "Join the Girls" – 3:52

== Personnel ==
Credits are adapted from the sleeve notes of Guillotine Theatre vinyl LP.

"Madman"

- Sean Purcell – lead vocals
- Faebhean Kwest – guitar
- Alig "Fodder" – keyboards
- Tony Baggett – bass
- Paddy Phield – drums

Production

- Cuddly Toys – producers, mixing
- Bob Broglia – engineer, mixing
- Sean Purcell, Tony Baggett – remixing

== Charts ==
Chart (1980)	Peak position
UK Independent Singles Chart	19
