= Ryan Choi =

Ryan Choi may refer to:

- Atom (Ryan Choi), a fictional superhero in DC Comics
- Ryan Choi (fencer) (born 1997), Hong Kong fencer
- Ryan Choi (musician) (born 1984), American musician
