= Family Fodder =

British post-punk rock band

Background information
- Origin: London
- Genres: Post-punk, indie rock, psychedelic
- Years active: 1970s–present
- Labels: The state51 Conspiracy, Jungle Records, Fresh Records, Parole Records, Staubgold Records, Dark Beloved Cloud, Psych.KG
- Website: www.familyfodder.co.uk

Family Fodder is an English post-punk group revolving around songwriter, multi-instrumentalist, composer/producer, and guitarist/keyboard player Alig Fodder. Formed in London in the 1970s, it has had a sporadic existence ever since, disbanding in the 1980s then reforming. NME described their song "Dinosaur Sex" as a "forgotten post-punk classic".

The first Family Fodder single, "Playing Golf (With My Flesh Crawling)", a joint release between Parole Records and Fresh Records, was released in 1979. In the same year a 12" single was released on Small Wonder Records by the same musicians as Frank Sumatra and the Mob.

A series of Family Fodder singles and 12" EPs followed on Fresh together with the album Monkey Banana Kitchen, often featuring French singer Dominique Levillain. The best-known singles were the indie chart entries "Debbie Harry", "Savoir Faire" and "Film Music". Also released were the mini-albums Sunday Girls and Schizophrenia Party on Fresh, and later the All Styles double-LP on Jungle Records, which Trouser Press hailed as "consistently enjoyable and infused with invention, cleverness, talent and a totally open outlook"

Alig Fodder continued to record and perform as Family Fodder over the years with evolving line-ups as well as under various alter-egos such as DJ Katface, Johnny Human, Vox Humana and The Lo Yo Yo.

Following the release of compilation Savoir Faire: The Best Of on US label Dark Beloved Cloud, in 2000 an early Family Fodder line-up including Levillain reformed to record the album Water Shed for that label. Allmusic called it "one of the better reunion albums of the post-punk generation."

In 2010 Family Fodder released Classical Music, featuring the singing of Darlini, daughter of original vocalist Dominique Levillain. It was followed in 2013 by Variety.

In 2014 German label Staubgold started a series of vinyl and CD reissues, the first being Family Fodder's debut album, 'Monkey Banana Kitchen', followed by 'Schizophrenia Party' and 'Sunday Girls', most featuring bonus tracks. To coincide, original members of the band reformed with a new singer Bee Ororo, and played live dates in Germany, France and Switzerland.

In 2016 an EP titled 'Sex Works' was announced by Jungle Records, followed by a 'lost' album, 'Foreverandever'. In 2018 a brand new album 'Easy Listening (Not)' with new singer Mae Karthauser was issued on CD on Furniture Records. In 2020 the 'Savoir Faire - the best of' album, first issued in the US by Dark Beloved Cloud in 1998, was reissued as a revamped and remastered vinyl 'Director's Cut' LP for Record Store Day.

Family Fodder songs have been covered by Zion Train, Unrest, and YACHT, amongst others.

Family Fodder appeared with Kommissar Hjuler on several projects for the series FLUXUS +/-, on the German label Psych.KG. He has also collaborated with Psapp, and the artist David Shrigley alongside David Byrne, Hot Chip, Franz Ferdinand and others on Shrigley's album 'Worried Noodles'

== Discography ==
=== Albums ===
- Sunday Girls (A Tribute to Blondie by Family Fodder and Friends), Parole Records, Fresh Records, 1979
- Monkey Banana Kitchen, Fresh Records, 1980 (reissued 2014, LP/CD, Staubgold Records)
- All Styles, Jungle Records, 1983
- The Lo Yo Yo (Steve Wright, Alig, Annie Hunt, Carrie Brooks, Mick Hobbs), id., Calypso Now, 1984
- The Lo Yo Yo, Extra Weapons, Floppy Discs, 1985
- Water Shed, Dark Beloved Cloud, 2000
- Idol Fodder, Bäbytalk, Slender Means Society, States Rights Records, 2008
- DJ Katface / Kommissar Hjuler und Frau (John Pearce, Kommissar Hjuler, Mama Baer), Pragmatix, Asylum Lunaticum (Germany) / Nagranie Brutalnie Domowy (Poland), 2010
- Classical Music, The state51 Conspiracy Ltd, 2010
- Variety, The state51 Conspiracy Ltd, 2013
- Easy Listening (Not), Furniture Records, 2018
- Play Kommissar Hjuler, Domestic Violence Recordsings, 2019
- The Bundt Cake Man by Kommissar Hjuler, SHMF, 2026
- Hjulercare (The Bundt Cake Man), SHMF, 2026

=== Compilations/split albums ===
- Greatest Hits, 33 rpm, Compañía Fonográfica Española, 1981 and Crammed Discs, 1981
- The Lo Yo Yo / Look De Bouk - Double Dog Dare, Summer '84, cassette-album, Calypso Now, 1984
- Savoir Faire : The Best Of, CD, Dark Beloved Cloud/Jungle Records, 1998
- More Great Hits!, 2xCD, Jungle Records, 2008
- Fluxus in the Bathroom, split-LP with Kommissar Hjuler, Psych.KG, 2017
- Arme Nuesse (Vol. 2), split-LP by Family Fodder & Kommissar Hjuler (collaboration) / Bladder Flask & B.P.O. (collaboration), Psych.KG, 2019
- Fluxus Im Hoch-Kasten split-LP by Family Fodder & Kommissar Hjuler (collaboration) / Kommissar Hjuler & Frau & KH12 / Jonathan Meese, Psych.KG, 2019
- The Inevitable Krystal "Belle" Boyd Record, split-LP by Family Fodder & Kommissar Hjuler & Mama Baer (collaboration) / Faust, Psych.KG, 2020
- Savoir Faire: The Best of Family Fodder (Director's Cut), vinyl LP Jungle Records, 2020
- Play Deathcrush (by Mayhem), LP, (Family Fodder/Kommissar Hjuler/Goodiepal & Bananskolen (collaboration)), (SHMF), 2023

=== Singles ===
- "Frank Sumatra and the Mob"/"Te Deum", maxi 45 rpm, Small Wonder Records, 1979
- "Playing Golf (With My Flesh Crawling)", 45 rpm, Parole Records, Fresh Records, 1979
- "Savoir Faire", 45 rpm, Fresh Records, 1980 and Crammed Discs, 1980
- "Debbie Harry", 45 rpm, Fresh Records, 1980
- "Warm"/"Desire", 45 rpm, Parole Records, Fresh Records, 1980
- "ScHiZoPhReNiA pArTy !", maxi 45t, Fresh Records, 1981
- "Film Music", 45 rpm, Fresh Records, 1981
- "The Big Dig", 45 rpm, Fresh Records, 1982
- "Coral", 45 rpm, Jungle Records, 1982
- "Professor Zoom" (Alig=Johnny Human, Mick Hobbs, Sam Alexander, Rick Wilson, Graham Painting, Professor Zoom), Urban Menace/1965, Alligator Discs, 1994
- "Tender Words", CD single, Dark beloved cloud, 2002
- "Alig Fodder"/"Alphabet Series Q", 45 rpm, Tomlab, 2007
- "Singularity 1"/"Love Is Like a Goat", CD limited edition, The state51 Conspiracy Ltd, March 2011
- "Singularity 2"/"Sitting in a Puddle", CD limited edition, The state51 Conspiracy Ltd, April 2011

=== Compilation appearances ===
- "Savoir Faire" appeared on A Fresh Selection compilation LP, Fresh Records, 1980
- "Debbie Harry" on Rough Trade: Post Punk 01, 2CD, 2003
- "Monkey", "Banana", and "Darling" appeared on Jonathan Meese & Tim Berresheim/Mama Baer/Family Fodder Fluxus in the Kitchen LP, Psych.KG, 2014
- "Symbols", and "Philosophy" appeared on Jonathan Meese/Mama Baer/Family Fodder Fluxus in the Kitchen #3 LP, Psych.KG, 2018
