= The Gate, Newcastle =

The Gate
- The exterior of the Gate.

General information
- Status: Completed, in use
- Type: Leisure, Entertainment
- Location: Newcastle upon Tyne, United Kingdom
- Coordinates: 54.973°N 1.618°W
- Current tenants: See venues
- Opened: 28 November 2002
- Cost: £80 million
- Client: Land Securities
- Owner: Crown Estate

Technical details
- Floor area: 19,235 m^{2} (207,040 sq ft)

Website
- www.thegatenewcastle.co.uk

The Gate is a retail and leisure complex in Newcastle upon Tyne, England.

== History ==
The venue takes its name from the street on which it stands, Newgate Street. It is part of the historic Grainger Town area of Newcastle. The noted concert hall the Mayfair Ballroom was among the buildings demolished to make way for The Gate.

The Gate has 19 venues spread across three floors, including a 16-screen Cineworld cinema and Aspers Casino. The Gate is also next to Newcastle's Chinatown; there is an entrance on Stowell Street. Mood Bar opened on 28 November 2002, the same time as The Gate. The 19,235 m^{2}, £80 million venue was built by Land Securities and the 12-metre-tall (39 ft) sculpture outside, "Ellipsis Eclipses", was designed by Danny Lane. The 24-metre-high (79 ft) glass façade was designed by Space Decks Limited. It was opened on 28 November 2002.

In 2003, The Gate won the Property Week award for Best Commercial UK Mixed-Use Leisure Scheme.

In 2004, BDP Lighting won a Lighting Design award for their work at The Gate.

In 2010, Jamie Ritblat's property company, Delancey, bought The Gate in a £900 million package of properties from PropInvest Group, in partnership with the Royal Bank of Scotland. In 2012 The Gate was sold to the Crown Estate for £60 million.

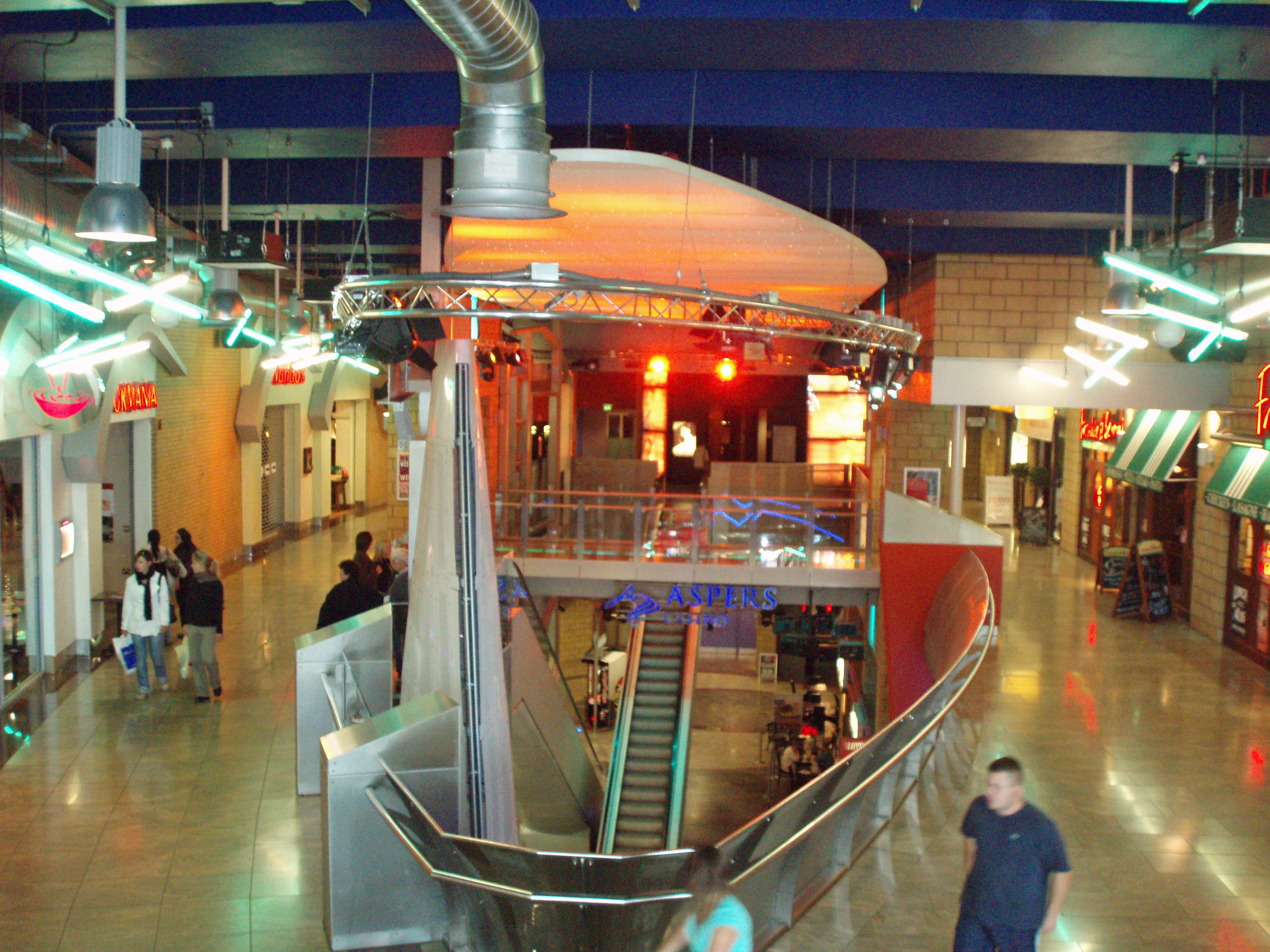
A view of the inside of the Gate showing the escalator from the ground floor to the first floor.
