= The Three Dancers =

Painting by Pablo Picasso

- Artist: Pablo Picasso
- Year: 1925
- Medium: Oil on canvas
- Dimensions: 215.3 cm × 142.2 cm (84.8 in × 56 in)
- Location: Tate Gallery; London

The Three Dancers (French: Les Trois Danseuses) is a painting by Spanish artist Pablo Picasso, painted in June 1925. It is an oil on canvas and measures 84.8 in x 56 in (215.3 cm x 142.2 cm).

== Description ==
The painting shows three dancers, the one on the right being barely visible. A macabre dance takes place, with the dancer on the left having her head bent at a near-impossible angle. The dancer on the right is usually interpreted as being Ramon Pichot, a friend of Picasso who died during the painting of Three Dancers (some critics believe it could well be Picasso's wife Olga Khokhlova.) The one on the left is claimed to be Pichot's wife Germaine Gargallo, with the one in the centre being Gargallo's boyfriend Carlos Casagemas, also Picasso's friend. Casagemas shot himself after failing to shoot Gargallo, twenty-five years before Pichot's death, and the loss of two of his best friends spurred Picasso to paint this chilling depiction of the love triangle.

== Background ==
Picasso painted The Three Dancers in Paris after a trip to Monte Carlo with his wife, ballet dancer Olga Khokhlova. At this time, Picasso was attracted to André Breton's Surrealism movement. In 1926 the painting appeared in Breton's work Le surréalisme et la peinture (Surrealism and Painting). Others link The Three Dancers to Picasso's failing marriage to Khokhlova.

Its caption at the Tate Gallery gives some insight into the background of the painting:

The jagged forms of Three Dancers convey an explosion of energy. The image is laden with Picasso's personal recollections of a triangular affair, which resulted in the heart-broken suicide of his friend Carlos Casagemas. Love, sex and death are linked in an ecstatic dance.

It is owned by the Tate Gallery, London, having been purchased by it in 1965, and is currently on display as part of the Tate Modern's 'Poetry and Dream' exhibition. The purchase was facilitated by Picasso's friendship with Roland Penrose who was a trustee of the Tate at that time.

== Related works ==
Composer and ukulele player Ryan Choi's debut album Three Dancers was named after the painting.

== Notes ==
1. Picasso called it Les Trois Danseuses (French) despite being a Spanish citizen, and the painting is occasionally called this, the original title (see ), as well as its English translation. Picasso lived in France and French titles for his paintings were not uncommon (see Garçon à la pipe and Les Demoiselles d'Avignon, for instance).
2. Three Dancers at Artchive
3. Three Dancers at everything2.com
4. The Guardian's Arts Feature, 7 July 2001
5. The Guardian's Arts Feature, 7 July 2001
6. Tate Gallery: The Three Dancers
7. Tate Gallery: The Three Dancers
8. web.org.uk - The Three Dancers
