= Alku =

Alku may refer to:

- 3037 Alku, an asteroid
- Alanya Alaaddin Keykubat University, a university in Turkey
- Alku, Iran, a village
- Alku and Alku Toinen, an apartment building in New York City
