= Danny Lane =

American artist (born 1955)

- Born: Malcolm Daniel Lane; 27 January 1955 (age 71); Urbana, Illinois, United States
- Education: Central School of Art and Design
- Known for: public art, mostly in glass
- Website: dannylane.co.uk

Malcolm Daniel Lane (born 27 January 1955), known professionally as Danny Lane, is an American sculptor working mainly in glass and associated with public art in the United Kingdom.

== Early life ==
Lane was born in 1955 in Urbana, Illinois, United States. He left school early and became involved in the American counterculture, distributing anti-Vietnam War leaflets from the age of 14 and attending protests in Washington, D.C., where he was arrested.

A subsequent six-month jail sentence for marijuana-related offences was the catalyst for his departure from the United States and move to the United Kingdom in 1975.

He later attended a summer school at the Ruskin School of Art and a foundation course at the Byam Shaw School of Art, before studying at the Central School of Art and Design.

== Work ==
Lane's work includes sculpture in glass and steel, as well as glass furniture, examples of which were shown in the 1999 exhibition Breaking Tradition at Mallett in London.

Lane has received commissions for public art. These include installations at Gateshead Interchange, the Victoria and Albert Museum in London, and The Gate, Newcastle. His work has also been installed near the Civic Centre in Southampton and outside the Senedd in Cardiff.

He has also worked with Skidmore, Owings & Merrill on commissions at Canary Wharf in London and the Renaissance Center in Detroit.
