= Variety (Family Fodder album) =

Studio album by Family Fodder
- Released: 29 July 2013
- Genre: Alternative
- Length: 37:55
- Label: The state51 Conspiracy

Family Fodder chronology
| Classical Music (2010) | Variety (2013) | Easy Listening (2018) |

Variety is the tenth album by Family Fodder and was released by London indie label The state51 Conspiracy in July 2013.

== Track listing ==
| No. | Title | Writer(s) | Length |
|---|---|---|---|
| 1. | "Déjà Déjà Vu" | Family Fodder | 3:56 |
| 2. | "The Pain Won't Go" | Family Fodder | 4:07 |
| 3. | "Love is Like a Goat" | Family Fodder | 3:23 |
| 4. | "Blue Puppies" | Family Fodder | 3:33 |
| 5. | "Vampyre on My Mind" | Family Fodder | 3:56 |
| 6. | "It's 1965" | Family Fodder | 5:24 |
| 7. | "Hippy Bus to Spain" | Family Fodder | 4:23 |
| 8. | "Backstreets of Infinity" | Family Fodder | 4:16 |
| 9. | "Sitting in a Puddle" | Family Fodder | 3:54 |
| 10. | "The Moon Told Me So" | Family Fodder | 3:40 |
| 11. | "Pluperfect" | Family Fodder | 0:56 |
| Total length: | | | 37:55 |
