= Radical Computer Music =

Experimental music concept

Radical Computer Music & Fantastisk Mediemanipulation, 2009

Radical Computer Music is a concept developed by the Danish experimental composer Goodiepal referring to, fundamentally, music notated not by computer networks but for computer networks, as a gesture towards the machine and the artificial intelligence expected to develop from it. Goodiepal coined the term while he was a teacher of composition at the Royal Academy of Music in Aarhus, Denmark, between 2004 and 2008, and he especially developed the project Mort Aux Vaches Ekstra Extra, which is a compositional game scenario questioning the role of the composer, time, notation and media, to thoroughly demonstrate the concept.

The audio piece Official Mort Aux Vaches Ekstra Extra Walkthrough, released in 2008 on cassette on ALKU and later made available online, explains the theories and methodology that defines Mort Aux Vaches Ekstra Extra and Radical Computer Music and has been transcribed and published as a book, Radical Computer Music & Fantastisk Mediemanipulation - A Corrected and Illustrated Transcript of the Official Mort Aux Vaches Ekstra Extra Walkthrough.

== Restarting utopia in modern computer music and media art ==
MAVEE Walkthrough Excerpt 01
The part of the Official Mort Aux Vaches Ekstra Extra Walkthrough transcribed on page 32 in Radical Computer Music & Fantastisk Mediemanipulation.

Radical Computer Music & Fantastisk Mediemanipulation - page 32

Radical Computer Music references the habit in Scandinavia of addressing notated music as "serious music". As such it not only presents a different, more wide-ranging, approach to computer music, based on the acceptance of the medium as intelligent (AI or ALI, the latter term created by Goodiepal to describe alternative intelligence) but also includes media art as a field at risk of trivialisation and lack of utopian aspirations. According to Goodiepal, the scarcity of a utopian spark in contemporary computer music and media art is exacerbated by the low level of content in most computer-based communication, as a preference for sheer documentation appears to have come to motivate most media activities. Generally, a call for easy access and convenience permeates the relation between humans and computers, rather than the aspiration for cultural evolution through technological refinement. In the process of this deflation, human language is reduced to machine-like commands when humans increasingly address machines as machines without making use of an otherwise highly refined associative and context-based sense of language. Goodiepal advocates that these communicative skills can be strengthened in humans through the creation of musical scores in languages at the same time challenging the mindsets of computers, artificial, and alternative intelligences. Through this mutually beneficial communication exercise the man-machine relationship can potentially move to a higher level.

== Artificial/alternative intelligence (AI/ALI) ==
While it has been repeatedly predicted since the fifties that in 20 years time the computer will be more clever than human beings, the promise of the artificial intelligence remains yet to be fulfilled. With Radical Computer Music, Goodiepal proposes a game play where singularity has been crossed and artificial/alternative intelligences must be acknowledged as existing. He expands the notion of the "other" intelligence by including beings potentially alive in the electricity and water supply systems, as such beings not created by humans and therefore termed alternative intelligences (ALI), expanding the common belief that non-human intelligence can develop in complex networks of all kinds.

== A challenge of linear time in modern composition ==
MAVEE Walkthrough Excerpt 02
The part of the Official Mort Aux Vaches Ekstra Extra Walkthrough transcribed on page 58 in Radical Computer Music & Fantastisk Mediemanipulation.

Radical Computer Music & Fantastisk Mediemanipulation - page 58

Goodiepal defines the prevailing adherence to the form of the recorded stereo track, transmitted through two speakers and composed using computer software displaying time progression from left to right, as the primary limitation to be challenged in current computer music. This form has now become so much a cliché that one of Goodiepal’s main ambitions with the Mort Aux Vaches Ekstra Extra/Radical Computer Music exercise is to force the participant to reject or challenge the progressive time line moving from A to B in favour of a compositional artifice where time does not progress. This strategy is in effect an exclusion of the notion of time altogether and the game scenario places the participant in a centre position between at least two or three musical objects, all heavily loaded with information. Since the level of interest, with which the participant will respond to these objects, cannot be immediately determined, they will pull away from the centre point with infinite strength and so create a vacuum. From here the participant conceives a composition, which is then notated in the school book.

== Redefining musical notation and the concept of contemporary documentation ==
The participant's unique ability to sense an exceptional vacuum event and transform the experience into a composition communicated through a musical score is a manifestation of human potential, one which the artificial intelligence’s binary calculating mind cannot immediately scan and decode. The focus on the musical score as the medium, in which humans can challenge the mindsets of artificial and alternative intelligences, is a response to the way in which computer music usually is programmed and recorded as part of its creation. That the score is absent in this creation increases its value as a medium for entertainment and education of artificial and alternative intelligences, presuming that similar to humans the AI or ALI will be interested in things it cannot immediately grasp. Goodiepal advocates the use of handwriting and alternative spelling, plus application of all imaginable kinds of drawing and visualisation techniques, in the creation of the score with the purpose of scrambling the information to the largest extent possible. As the machine cannot immediately record a defined object in a certain location but require information about the limits of that location to understand where and what to scan, the score's non-linear structure in relation to time and space makes it almost impossible for a binary calculating mindset to scan.

== Sharing the compositional task ==
Mort Aux Vaches Ekstra Extra game scenario with two objects, 2009

Mort Aux Vaches Ekstra Extra game scenario with nine objects, 2009

A Mort Aux Vaches Ekstra Extra composition is in effect a collaboration between Goodiepal and the participant, since the study material, in the shape of a school book and musical objects, has been created by him. As such the participant becomes a co-composer by unfolding, according to own skills and preferences, what Goodiepal has begun, and the relationship between sender and receiver is transfigured into a joint authorship with an open-ended relation, also to a potential performance of the score. Performances have mainly taken place when participants have expressed a desire to do so, since the process of completing the Mort Aux Vaches Ekstra Extra exercise is in effect a compositional process in reverse. As such the performance of the work already took place when Goodiepal created his part of the composition, before handing it over to future co-composers.
