= Newcastle town wall =

Medieval defensive wall in England

- Newcastle upon Tyne, England
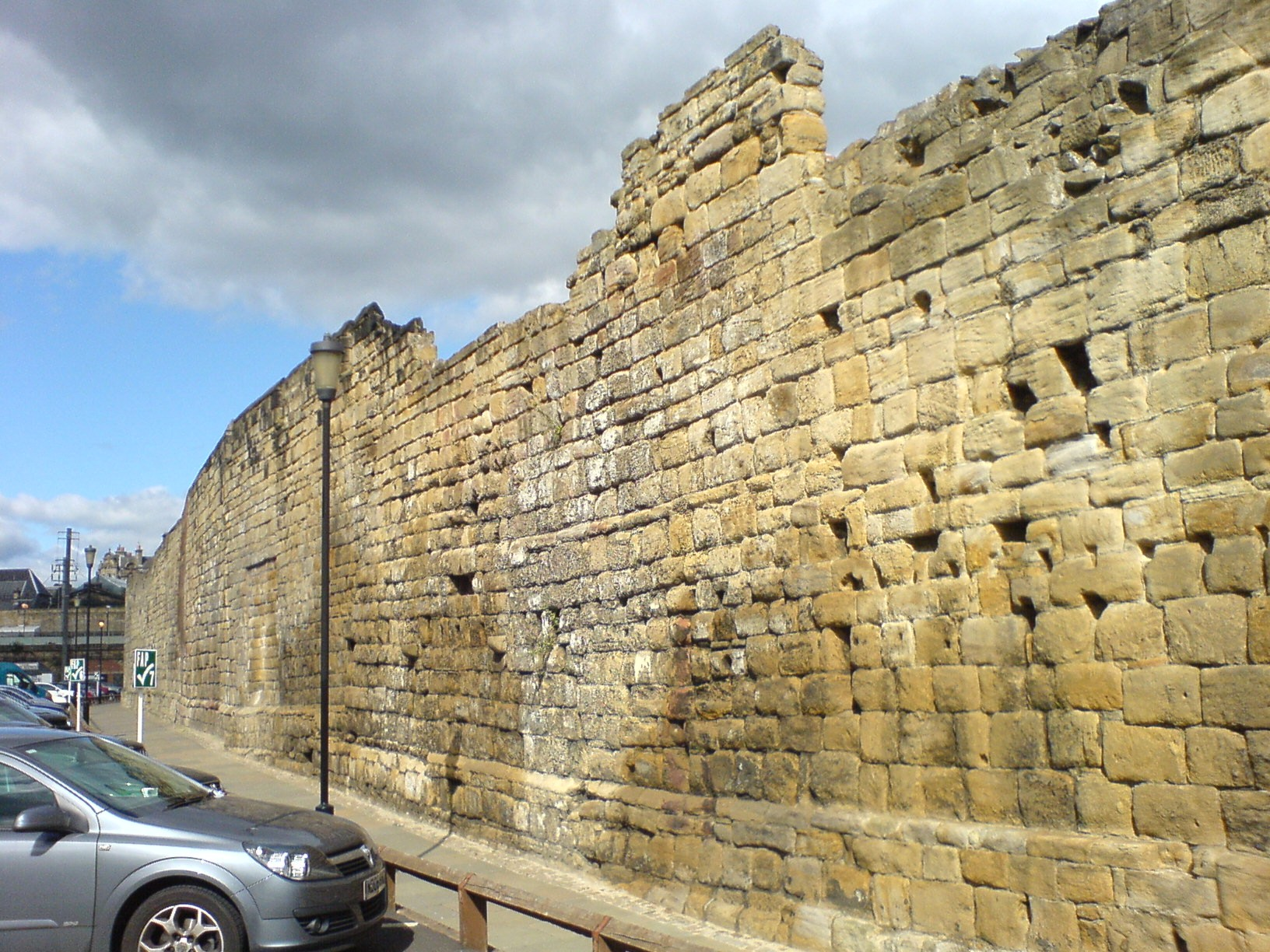
- The Newcastle town wall at Orchard Street, running south towards the River Tyne

Location
- Coordinates: 54°58′18″N 1°37′17″W
- Height: Up to 7.6 metres (25 ft) high.

Site history
- Built: 13th and 14th century
- Materials: Stone

The Newcastle town wall is a medieval defensive wall, and Scheduled Ancient Monument, in Newcastle upon Tyne, northern England. It was built during the 13th and 14th centuries, and helped protect the town from attack and occupation during times of conflict. It was approximately 3 kilometres (2 mi) long, at least 2 metres (6.5 ft) thick, up to 7.6 metres (25 ft) high, and had six main gates: Close Gate, West Gate, New Gate, Pilgrim Gate, Pandon Gate and Sand Gate. It also had seventeen towers, as well as several smaller turrets and postern gates. The town wall was kept in good repair whilst there was a threat of invasion from Scottish armies, and the town was successfully defended on at least two occasions; but with the decline of the border wars between England and Scotland, the wall was allowed to deteriorate.

During the English Civil War, the Scots were able to breach the wall using mines and artillery. By the mid-18th century the wall had become obsolete and, as the town was redeveloped, large sections were demolished leaving only parts standing. The most substantial remains are the West Walls, on the western side of the city.

== Construction ==
The town wall was constructed during the 13th and 14th centuries to repel Scottish invaders. Newcastle is about 100 kilometres (60 mi) from the River Tweed, which then marked the border between England and Scotland. At that time there was a power struggle between England and Scotland, that eventually led to the Wars of Scottish Independence. The Scottish kings were always ready to take advantage of any weakness in English rule to invade the North of England. An example of this is David I of Scotland, who took advantage of the civil war between Stephen and Matilda to invade Northumberland in three successive years—1136–8. In the Treaty of Durham (1139), David's son Henry was given the earldom of Northumberland. Newcastle was not included in this grant but the Scots ignored this clause and occupied Newcastle until 1157. Although the town had a strong castle, built by Robert Curthose in 1080, and improved by Henry II between 1172 and 1177, it did not provide sufficient protection for the local merchants' properties, and so it was decided that a fortified town wall was needed.

A special tax, or "murage", was levied by the borough to pay for the construction, murus being Latin for wall. It was first levied in 1265, so it can be assumed that construction began soon after that date. The payment of murage continued for the next hundred years, so construction was probably not finished until at least the mid-14th century.

The plans for the route of the wall changed somewhat during construction. In the original plan, the castle was to be included in the wall as a strongpoint. However, the castle was set on high ground above the river bank and there were strong objections to this route, as it would miss out the area by the river where many of the principal burgesses lived, leaving their residences without protection. The route was therefore changed so that the wall turned southward at the Neville Tower and ran down to the river. A similar adjustment to the route was made to the east of the city. In 1299 the village of Pandon was formally incorporated as part of the city, and so the wall made a sharp turn to the east to skirt around Pandon until it reached the river. From Pandon, the wall ran westward along the river, separating the town from the quay. Here, the wall was pierced by a number of water gates that allowed access to the river for loading and unloading of ships. In 1616 it was ordered that these gates were to be closed at night to prevent servants from throwing rubbish into the river. One or two were left open to allow seamen to return to their ships, but these were watched all night.

"the strength and magnificens of the waulling of this town far passeth al the waulles of the cities of England, and most of the townes of Europe."

— John Leland

When completed, the wall was approximately 3 kilometres (2 mi) long, at least 2 metres (6.5 ft) thick and up to 7.6 metres (25 ft) high. It had six main gateways and seventeen towers as well as several smaller turrets and postern gates. The towers projected out from the walls and were within bowshot of each other, so that attackers trying to scale the walls were exposed to fire from both sides (i.e., from the towers), as well as from the front (i.e., from the walls). The postern gates were provided for institutions, such as the Dominican Order of Blackfriars and the Hospital of St Mary the Virgin (which still exists as an almshouse charity), so that they could access their property outside the walls. Even before the walls were complete, they were supplemented by an outer ditch, known as the King's Dyke. The ditch was over 11 metres (36 ft) wide and 4.5 metres (15 ft) deep in front of the Herber and Morden Towers. It was completed by 1317.

== Subsequent history ==
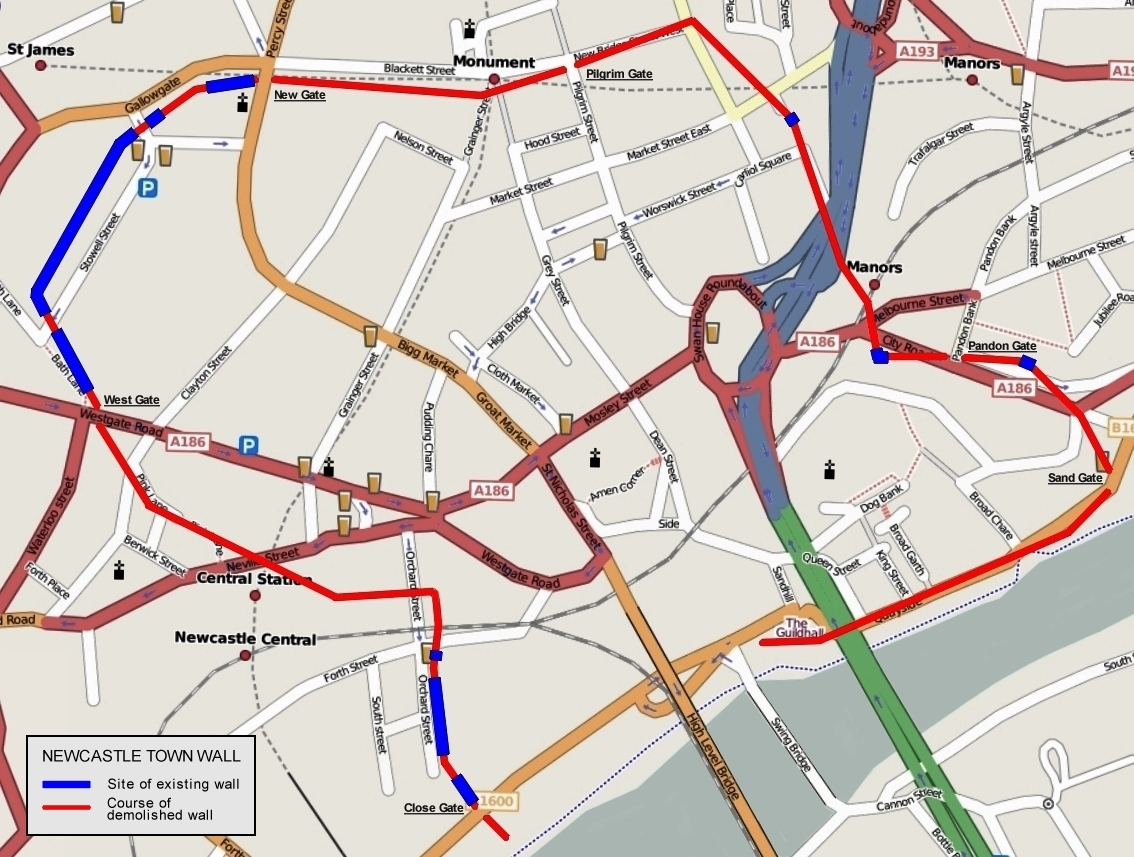
A modern map of Newcastle showing the approximate course of the town wall in red; extant sections of the wall are in blue.

The town wall was kept in good repair whilst there was a threat of invasion from the Scots. In 1342, David II of Scotland invaded Northumberland and laid siege to Newcastle, without success. In 1388, another Scottish army under the Earl of Douglas assaulted the town, but was repulsed. As the border wars between England and Scotland became less frequent, and in particular following the union of the two crowns in 1603, the wall was allowed to deteriorate.

In 1640, during the Bishops' Wars and in 1644, during the English Civil War, Scottish armies were able to invade Newcastle despite the presence of the town wall. In 1648 the Parliamentarian governor had the wall repaired. Further repairs were carried out in 1667. During the Jacobite rebellions of 1715 and 1745, it was substantially strengthened in preparation for an invading Jacobite army, but there were no attacks on those occasions. A long decline then began, during which the wall was demolished piecemeal to make way for new developments and to create better access to the town centre. The last repairs to the wall were made in the early 19th century, during the Napoleonic Wars. After this it was thought that the town no longer needed a defensive barrier.

The first part of the wall to be demolished was the stretch on the quayside, as it was regarded as "a very great obstacle to carriages and a hindrance to the despatch of business". The quayside section was pulled down in 1763 and the Sand Gate followed in 1798.

== Gates ==
There were six main gateways through the wall, they were (clockwise from western end):

Close Gate – This gate was situated at the end of Close, the street that ran west from Sandhill, parallel with the river. In early times, Close was the principal residence of the wealthy traders of the town, and was lined with merchants’ houses backing on to the river, with their own wharves. It is believed that the town wall ran only a short distance eastwards along the river from the Close Gate. On the north side of the Close Gate was the Whitefriars Tower, and it was the section of wall near there that the Scottish forces under General Leven broke through in the siege of 1644, after breaching the wall by use of mines and artillery fire. Close Gate was demolished in 1797.

West Gate – This gate led to the West Road which followed the line of the old Roman Wall. It had large oak gates and iron doors, and was described by the antiquary, John Leland, as "a mightye strong thinge." It was, at one time, used as a prison, and later became the hall of the incorporated company of House Carpenters. 17 prisoners were held there during the Civil War, but they managed to escape. It was demolished in 1811.

New Gate – This gate had heavy fortifications, and from 1399, these were used as the town gaol. Condemned prisoners would be taken from there along Gallowgate to the gallows on the Town Moor. East and west wings were constructed in 1702 and 1706, respectively; a north gate was later added. By 1820, the gaol was considered to be in a poor state of repair and insecure. A new gaol was built in Carliol Square, and the demolition of New Gate began in June 1823. The east wing was pulled down first, followed by the west wing and the north gate; the oldest part of the structure remained standing but, despite opposition, it was removed the following September. New Gate is believed to have replaced an earlier gateway known as Berwick Gate.

Pilgrim Gate or Pilgrim Street Gate – This gate, at the north end of Pilgrim Street, led out towards Jesmond. Pilgrims would use this gate when travelling to St Mary's Chapel, which was situated overlooking what is now Jesmond Dene; the chapel's ruins survive. A room above the Gate was used by the Joiners' Company. It was demolished in 1802.

Pandon Gate – This gate led northeast from the village of Pandon and had folding iron gates, but no portcullis. Until 1648, it was used as a hall for the Barber Chirurgeons. It was demolished in 1795.

Sand Gate – This gate led to the riverbank to the east of the town. It was demolished in 1798.

Until 1695 the Gates were closed at night.

== Preservation ==
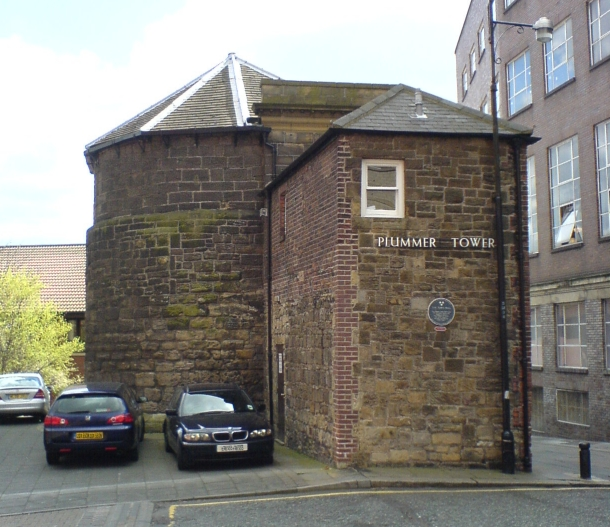
Plummer Tower to the south of the Laing Art Gallery

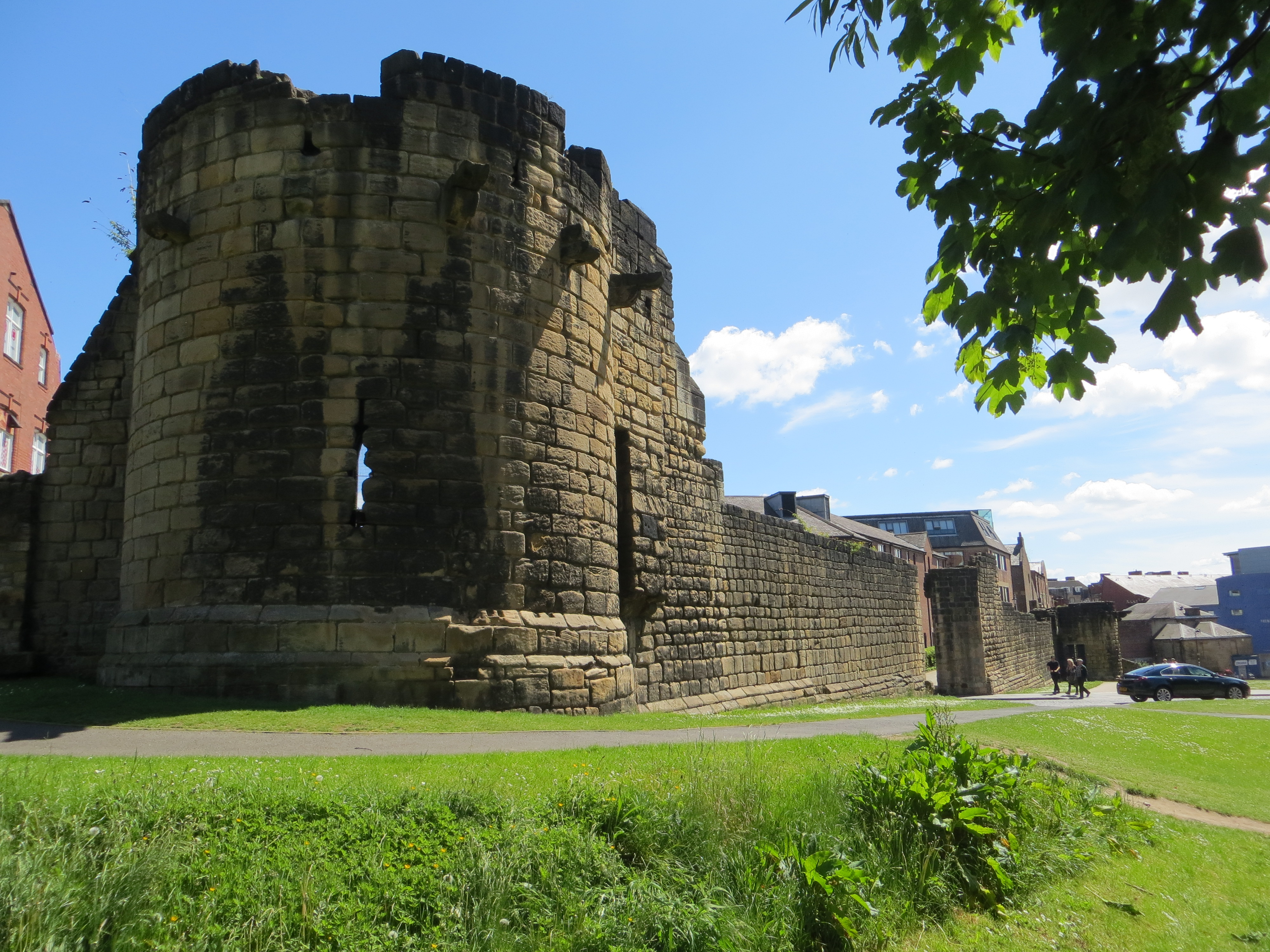
Herber Tower looking towards Durham Tower

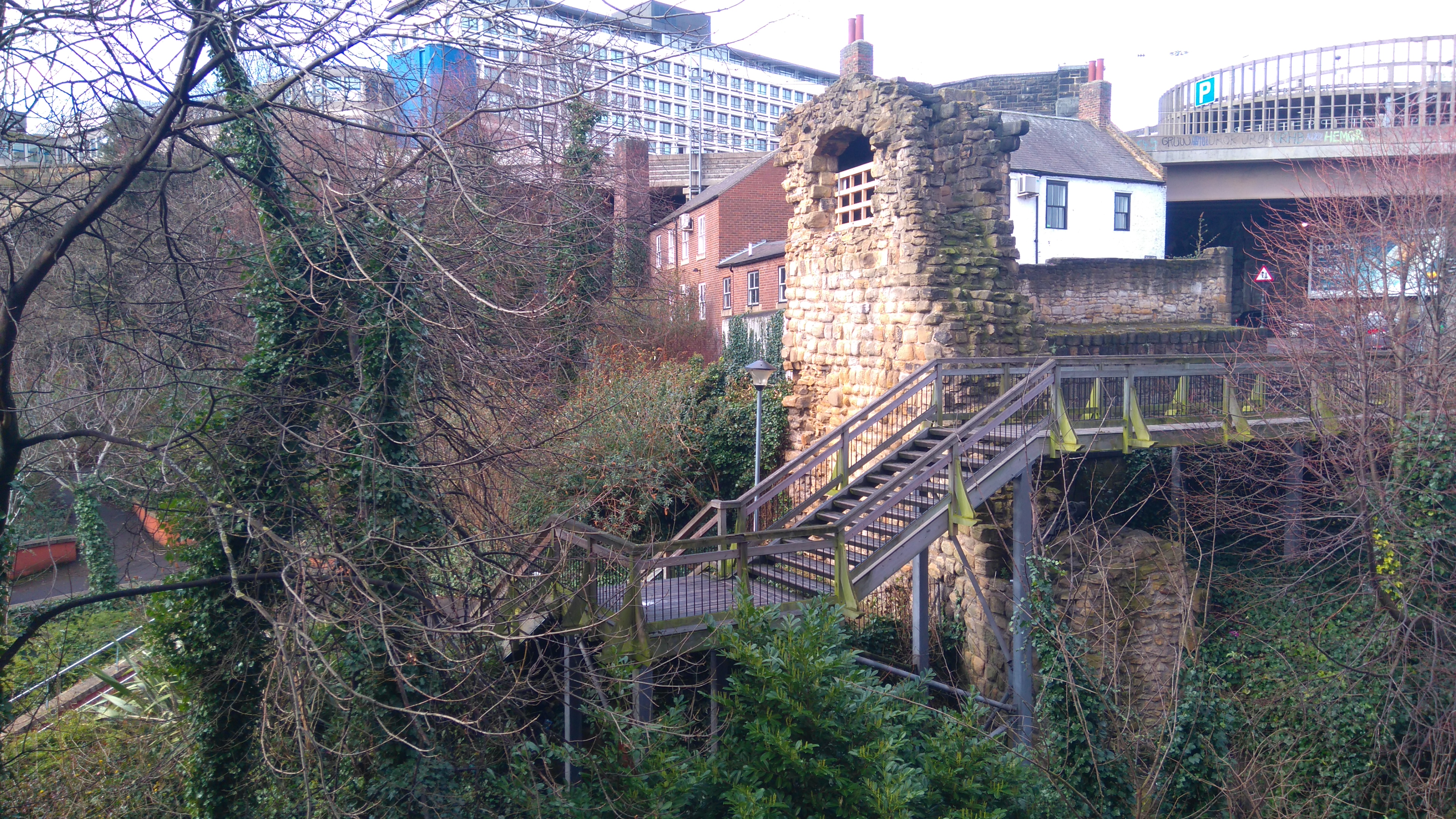
Corner Tower to the north of the Millennium Bridge

Large amounts of the wall were demolished during the 18th and 19th centuries; the most substantial remains are on the western side of the city. The longest continuous section runs the length of Back Stowell Street, in the Chinatown area. It includes three towers: Herber Tower, Morden Tower and Ever Tower; since 1964, Morden Tower has been used as a venue for poetry readings. At the northern end of this section, the wall has been cut through by St Andrew's Street, with fragmentary remains in St Andrew's churchyard, opposite; at the southern end, Stowell Street cuts through onto Bath Lane. The outer ditch has been recreated along this part of the wall. From Stowell Street, a complete section of wall, which includes Durham Tower, stretches southeast along Bath Lane, ending close to Westgate Road. The walls between Westgate Road and St Andrew's Street are known as the West Walls. Near the river, a partially demolished section of wall is visible on the steep bank between Hanover Street and Close which, between the 1840s and the 1980s, was covered by warehouses. Another substantial portion of the wall stands north of Hanover Street, adjacent to Orchard Street, and the excavated foundations of Gunner Tower can be seen in Pink Lane. On the eastern side of the city stand three towers: Plummer Tower in Croft Street, Corner Tower at the junction of City Road and Melbourne Street, and Sallyport Tower in Tower Street. Plummer Tower was modified by the Company of Cutlers in the 17th century, and the Company of Masons, who added an upper storey and a new western facade, in the 18th century. Sallyport Tower was altered by the addition of a banqueting hall on the first floor in 1716 which was used by the Shipwrights' Company. The walls are a Scheduled Ancient Monument.

== See also ==
- List of town walls in England and Wales
