= Aligav =

Aligav علي گاو
- Village
- Location within Iran
- Coordinates: 37°36′26″N 46°54′50″E
- Country: Iran
- Province: East Azerbaijan
- County: Bostanabad
- Bakhsh: Tekmeh Dash
- Rural District: Abbas-e Gharbi

Population (2006)
  - Total: 115
- Time zone: UTC+3:30 (IRST)
  - Summer (DST): UTC+4:30 (IRDT)

Aligav (Persian: علي گاو, also Romanized as ‘Alīgāv; also known as ‘Alīgū and Alkū) is a village in Abbas-e Gharbi Rural District, Tekmeh Dash District, Bostanabad County, East Azerbaijan Province, Iran. At the 2006 census, its population was 115, in 26 families.
