= Morden Tower =

Tower in Newcastle upon Tyne, England

- Tyne and Wear, England, UK
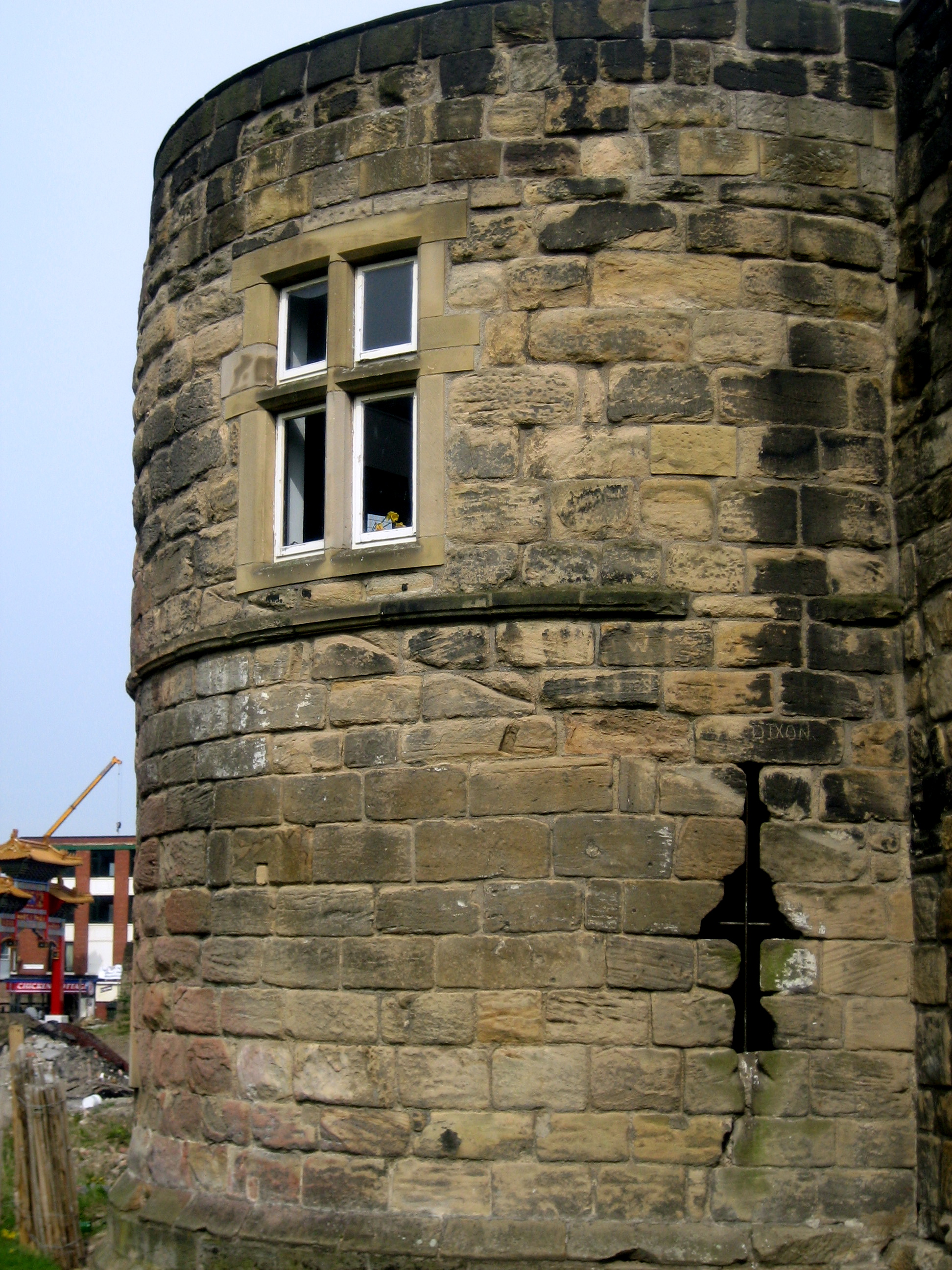
- Morden Tower, Newcastle

Location
- Location in Tyne and Wear
- Coordinates: 54.97256°N 1.62036°W
- Grid reference: NZ244642

The Morden Tower in Back Stowell Street on the West Walls of Newcastle upon Tyne, England, is a Scheduled Ancient Monument and a Grade I listed building. Since June 1964, Connie Pickard has been custodian of Morden Tower, and has made it a key fixture of Newcastle's alternative cultural life, with the building hosting music and poetry events often funded by Pickard.

Currently (October 2021), there are no cultural events running at the Morden Tower space, and the status of the custodianship is not known publicly. The official website is inactive.

== History ==
The Tower was built about 1290. It is one of five Drum towers that remain of the sixteen that were built as part of the medieval town wall enclosing the city of Newcastle. The tower and wall were built on ground sloping towards the south, which formed part of the precinct of the Dominican Blackfriars, Newcastle, many of the buildings of which still survive. From the 16th century the Morden Tower housed the Company of Plumbers, Plasterers and Glaziers.

== Poetry centre ==
The Morden Tower has been a major centre for poetry readings in the North East since 1964 when Tom Pickard and Connie Pickard took out the lease. It has developed a national and international reputation for attracting significant British and American literary figures working during this period. It has been particularly noted for its association with many Beat and Black Mountain poets.

Tom and Connie Pickard were instrumental in bringing about the Newcastle's Poetry Revival. During this time they amassed a collection of books and pamphlets not obtainable in bookshops at the time. Using the Morden Tower as a venue for poetry readings and a book room they ensured Tower audiences were kept in touch with writing from Edinburgh, Paris, San-Francisco, Greenwich Village, Liverpool and Ladbroke Grove.

During the 1960s and 1970s, the Tower was an inspiration and catalyst for other counter culture ventures, in particular an outpost for Alexander Trocchi project.

Basil Bunting gave the first reading of Briggflatts in the Morden Tower, on 22 December 1965. The intimate, simple space of the Tower's upper room has been recognised by poets and audiences as an ideal location for voiced poetry, with Bob Cobbing describing it as "simply the most congenial place in the world in which to perform poetry".

Other poets to have read there include Allen Ginsberg, Ted Hughes, Lawrence Ferlinghetti, Gregory Corso, Seamus Heaney, Tom Raworth, Carol Ann Duffy, Fleur Adcock and Liz Lochhead. Despite a lack of funding Morden Tower is still a popular venue for poets and experimental musicians, such as John Hegley and A Hawk and a Hacksaw.

== Significant literary events ==
- Pete Brown gave the first reading on 16 June 1964: Bloomsday
- Basil Bunting gave his first public reading of Briggflatts in 1965
- Allen Ginsberg gave his first European reading of Kaddish
- Ed Dorn gave his first European Reading of Gunslinger

== Publications ==
- King Ida's Watch Chain - 1965: A collection of Poems by Basil Bunting. A new format magazine designed by Richard Hamilton
- The Spoils – Basil Bunting 1965: Cover design and photographs by Richard Hamilton, distributed by Migrant Press
- High on the Wall: a Morden Tower Anthology, published by Morden Tower in association with Bloodaxe Books to commemorate the tower's first 25 years in 1990. Edited by Gordon Brown.

== Music at Morden Tower ==
Morden Tower has a history of providing a platform for new and experimental music. Musicians who have played at the Tower include Alan Hull of Lindisfarne, Grayson Capps, Les Cox Sportifs, Paul Smith of Maxïmo Park, Richard Dawson, Teitur, John Power, Chris Corsano, Mecca Normal, Sir Richard Bishop, Jack Rose, Cath & Phil Tyler, Burning Star Core, Prurient, Jakob Olausson, Mama Baer & Kommissar Hjuler, Jozef Van Wissem, C Joynes, Keith Fullerton Whitman, Jazzfinger, Peter Walker, Alasdair Roberts, James Ferraro, Monopoly Child Star Searchers, Calvin Johnson A Hawk and a Hacksaw, Tonstartssbandht, Silver Fox, Rachel Lancaster, Viv Albertine, Stuart Moxham, Wrest, Funeral Danceparty, Metgumbnerbone, Morgellons, Big Fail and Matt "Black Pudding" Bovingdon on knife and fork.

A Better Noise, Subterranean, Jumpin' Hot Club, NO-FI and A Glimpse of Paradise have all promoted semi regular gigs at Morden Tower over the last ten years.

The band Whitehouse performed at the Tower in 1983, supported by Ramleh and The New Blockaders. Whitehouse's set has become notorious because William Bennett slapped a female audience member in the face which caused most of the audience to leave in protest.
