= Kommissar Hjuler =

German experimental musician

Kommissar Hjuler (born Detlev Hjuler; 1967) works as a sound recordist in the field of Noise and Post-industrial music, visual artist, film maker and police officer at Flensburg, a town on the German border with Denmark. He often works together with his wife Mama Baer as Kommissar Hjuler und Frau. As a self-taught artist he began making music in 1999 and visual art in 2006. He is considered to work in the field of neo dada, whereas his output also contains elements of fluxus, art brut.

== Work ==
Kommissar Hjuler und Frau performed at several festivals like Colour out of Space Festival at Brighton, Zappanale, UND #6/ART Karlsruhe, Festival Bruit de la Neige at Annecy, Avantgarde Festival Schiphorst, Blurred Edges Hamburg, Incubate Festival Tilburg, Rapid Ear Movement Festival by Projektgruppe Neue Musik e. V. Bremen, Brise°3 festival Flensburg, and at artists' venues like Morden Tower, Cafe Oto, Z33 Kunstencentrum, MS Stubnitz, Weserburg, iLLUSEUM Amsterdam, Gängeviertel Hamburg, Upper Church Gallery Edinburgh, Centre For Contemporary Art Warsaw/Ujazdów Castle, Museum of Modern Fine Art on Dmitrovskaya (Rostov on Don), KM Music Conservatory, Boekie Woekie Amsterdam, Lokaal01 Breda, Grambacht Mechelen, Extrapool, Künstlerhaus Sootbörn, or Mary Bauermeister's performance space.

His visual art has been exhibited in solo and groups shows at locations like the Institute of Contemporary Arts, Schloss Liedberg (Korschenbroich), Museum Obere Saline (Bad Kissing), Neues Museum Weserburg, Haus der Kleinen Künste (München), Kunstverein Harburger Bahnhof (Hamburg), Hamburger Bahnhof (Berlin), Atelierhaus & Galerie A24 (Bergisch-Gladbach), Jan van Eyck Academie, Sallis Benny Theatre (Brighton), VAC Gallery (Northwich), Museum Huelsmann Bielefeld, Museum of Contemporary Art Australia, Museum Brasileiro da Escultura (São Paulo) and at several galleries like Kunstraum Winterthur, Galerie Cross Art (Berlin), Itami City Gallery (Japan), fzkke Euskichen, kunsTTempel (Kassel), The Box (Düsseldorf), ARTpool (St. Petersburg), Fabbrica Immagine (Rome), Flux Factory (Long Island City), Chicago Cultural Center, 6028 Gallery (Chicago), Eyedrum. Selected art works are part of collections like Artpool Art Research Center, Avant Writing Collection by the Ohio State University, Fondazione Bonotto, the VAC Archive Northwich, the Jan van Eyck Academie, the Wolf Vostell Archive, and the ZKM Karlsruhe.

Short films by Kommissar Hjuler have been presented at European festivals like 12. Internationales Kurzfilmfestival Muenchen 2010, Vienna Independent Shorts 2011, Leeds International Film Festival 2011, and at Museum of Contemporary Art, Chicago.

Since November 9, 2009 he has been a member of the NO!art movement, founded by Boris Lurie, Stanley Fisher and Sam Goodman at March gallery New York in 1960.

The German novelist Peter Rathke, who works under the pseudonym FOLTERGAUL, represented Kommissar Hjuler as a character at his novel Im Knast mit Kommissar Hjuler und Mama Baer.

End of July 2025 he published his novel "Der Napfkuchenmann", and end of November 2025 "Der Napfkuchenmann 2" together with his wife. Summer 2026, an English translation "The Bundt Cake Man" got published by Editions Cox, Canada/Germany.
