= Fresh Records (UK) =

British record label

Fresh Records was a British independent record label, and distributor based in the United Kingdom. Most popular (and successful) in the early 1980s, the label once supported punk groups like The Wall, UK Decay, Play Dead, Family Fodder, Cuddly Toys, The Dark, Wilko Johnson and Big Hair and competed with labels such as 4AD.

The sleeve-notes from Anagram's Fresh Records Punk Singles Collection reads: "The seeds of Fresh Records were sown in Alex Howe's Wretched Records stall in London's Soho Market in 1978. Alex also ran a mail-order service, and demand from other shops for the Buzzcock's 'Spiral Scratch' EP led him to start Fresh Distribution. Bands such as the Art Attacks, Second Layer, UK Decay and Manufactured Romance came to the stall looking for an outlet for their records. Alan Hauser joined Alex in 1979 bringing his Parole Records label with Family Fodder, Cuddly Toys, The Wall and Bernie Torme to set up the Fresh Records label, and the roster quickly took shape."

The label ran out of cash and went bankrupt in 1982. Staff at the label formed Jungle Records and bought the rights to the label recordings.

A dance label of the same name began in the UK in 1992, supporting artists such as Lovestation, Strike and Serious Danger.

== See also ==
- List of record labels
- Fresh Records (US)
