= Mama Baer =

German sound recordist

- Born: 29 October 1981 (age 45); Andrea Katharina Ingeborg Göthling
- Citizenship: German
- Occupations: sound recordist in the field of Noise and Post-industrial music, visual artist, and filmmaker

Mama Baer (born Andrea Katharina Ingeborg Göthling; 29 October 1981) is a German sound recordist of noise music and post-industrial music. She is a filmmaker and visual artist in Flensburg. She has had solo and group art exhibitions around the world, and her short films have been presented at several film festivals.

== Early life ==
Mama Baer was born Andrea Katharina Ingeborg Göthling on October 29, 1981.

== Career ==
She works as a sound recordist in the field of Noise and Post-industrial music, visual artist, and filmmaker in Flensburg. She often works together with her husband Kommissar Hjuler as Kommissar Hjuler und Frau. A self-taught artist, she began making music in 1999 and visual art in 2006. Her art is in the field of neo dada and art brut.

Mama Baer has a huge amount of music releases available at independent labels like Ultra Eczema, Intransitive Recordings, Nihilist Records, Obskyr Records and others. She shares albums with Bomis Prendin, Franz Kamin, Philip Krumm, Wolf Vostell, and others.

== Performance ==
Kommissar Hjuler und Frau performed at festivals such as Colour out of Space Festival, Brighton, 2009, Zappanale, Bad Doberan, 2010, Incubate (festival) Nijmegen, 2010, and at artists' venues like Morden Tower, Café Oto or Mary Bauermeister's performance space. They performed live with Jan van den Dobbelsteen and Danielle Lemaire, Eugene Chadbourne, John Wiese, Heather Leigh Murray, Clive Graham, and others.

== Art ==
She has presented in solo and group art exhibitions around the world. On 9 November 2009 she joined the NO!art movement.

German novelist, Peter Rathke presented Mama Baer as a character in his novel Im Knast mit Kommissar Hjuler und Mama Baer.

Mama Baer was played by Kathleen Gregory in an incomplete short film by Fred Wilder. Kommissar Hjuler and Mama Baer wrote most of the film's music.
