= Grainger Town =

Historic centre of Newcastle-upon-Tyne, England

Coordinates: 54.9725°N 1.6114°W

Grainger and Nelson streets, in Grainger Town.

Grainger Town is the historic commercial centre of Newcastle upon Tyne, England. It covers approximately 36 ha (89 acres). Almost all of Grainger Town is in Newcastle's Central Conservation Area, one of the first designated in England. The area includes a medieval 13th-century Dominican priory, pieces of the historic Town Walls, and many fine Georgian and Victorian buildings.

The area is named after Richard Grainger, a developer who built several classical streets between 1824 and 1841, including Grey Street, Grainger Street, and Clayton Street. Richard Grainger was said to “have found Newcastle of bricks and timber and left it in stone” (echoing what Augustus claimed to have done for Rome).

Some of Newcastle's finest buildings are in Grainger Town, including Grainger Market and Theatre Royal. These buildings are predominantly four stories, with vertical dormers, domes, turrets, and spikes. The architecture is dubbed “Tyneside Classical”. Grainger Town has 450 buildings, and 244 are listed (29 at grade I and 49 at grade II*). The majority of buildings remain in private ownership.

Sir Nikolaus Pevsner described Grey Street as “one of the finest streets in England”. The area around it and Grey's Monument is expanding quickly, with high-quality shopping, including designer fashions and jewelry. The Central Exchange, containing the Edwardian Central Arcade, is located in Grainger Town.

== Grey Street ==
Grey's monument

Grey Street

Grainger built Grey Street in the 1830s. Several architects, including John Dobson, were involved. The street’s entire western side was designed by two architects from Grainger's office, John Wardle and George Walker. Grey Street contains the Theatre Royal designed by John and Benjamin Green, the southern entrance to Monument Metro station, and the Central Arcade. BBC Radio 4 listeners voted it “Best street in the UK” in 2010.

Initially named Upper Dean Street, Grey Street runs south from Grey's Monument, following the route of the Lorke or Lort Burn, which formerly flowed openly into the Tyne and is now enclosed, curving slowly to the east and descending to the river. It ends after the Mosley Street junction, where Dean Street, constructed in 1749, begins.

Sir John Betjeman said:

As for the curve of Grey Street, I shall never forget seeing it to perfection, traffic-less on a misty Sunday morning. Not even Regent Street, even old Regent Street London, can compare with that descending subtle curve.

53 Grey Street

The Exchange buildings

Turk's Head Hotel

The Central Arcade

== Grainger Market ==
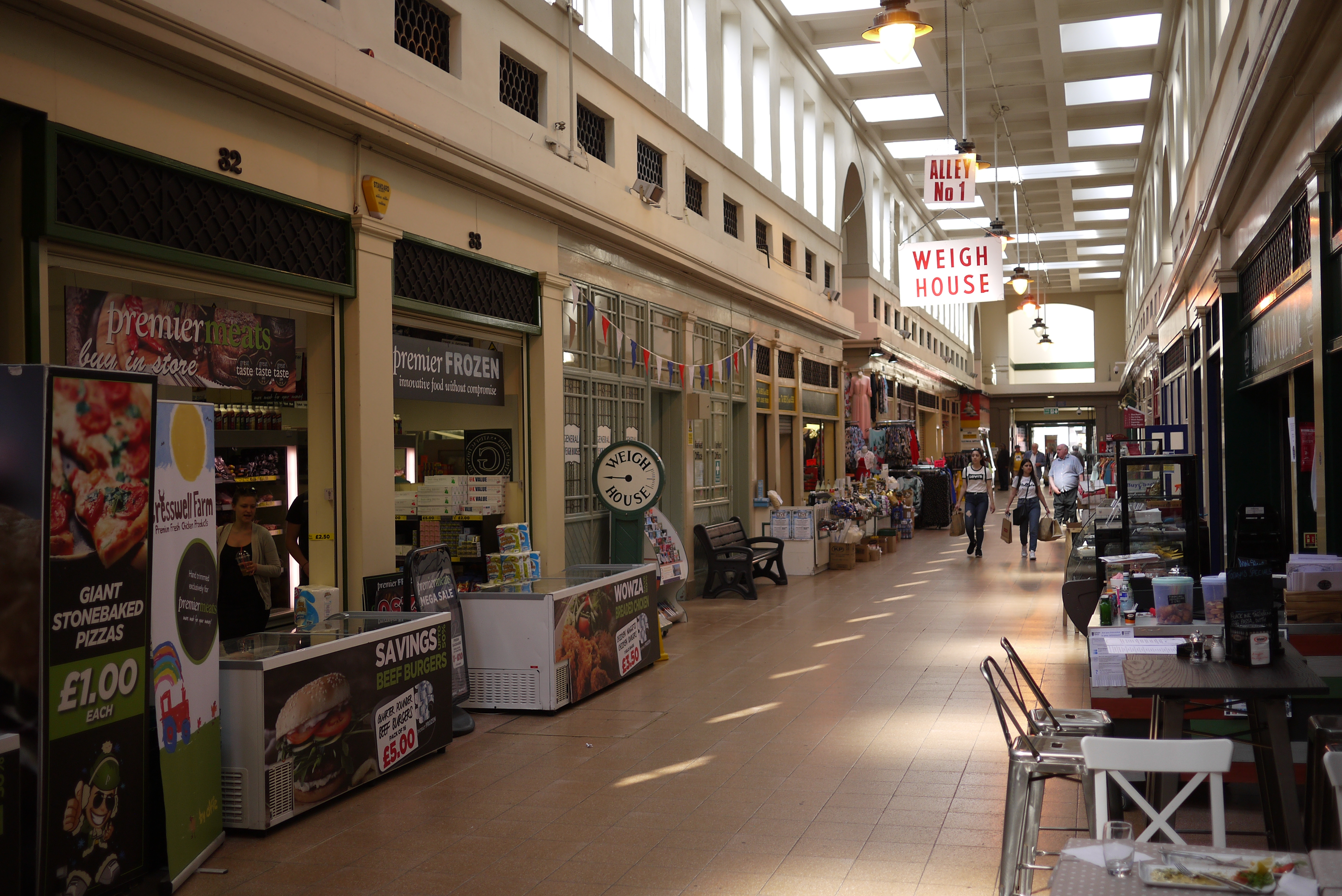
The vegetable market inside Grainger Market

Grainger Market is a Grade I listed covered market, constructed as part of the 19th-century urban renewal replacing markets on the site of Grey Street. Designed by John Dobson, it opened in 1835. The market has two sections: The Eastern, which was a meat market laid out in a series of aisles; and the Western, which was a vegetable market with a large open hall. The vegetable market's roof was in ill-repair by 1898, and the current roof was installed in 1901. While the principal uses of the market have since changed, it still houses a number of butchers' stalls.

The market is home to a small branch of Marks & Spencer, a market stall known as Marks and Spencer's Original Penny Bazaar.

During World war 2 air raid shelters were built under the market. In 2024 redevelopment plans and the poor condition of the shelters lead to the council proposing to fill it with concrete.

== Decay ==
In the 1960s and 1970s, parts of Grainger Town, constituting about a quarter of Grainger's original scheme, were demolished to make way for projects such as the Eldon Square Shopping Centre.

In the 1980s and early 1990s, the area was overtaken by new retail and commercial centres.

By the early 1990s, Richard Grainger's legacy was in poor shape, as shops and offices moved to other locations. The area’s residential population fell rapidly to 1,200. Around 100,000 m^{2} (1.1 million square feet) was vacant, and the area exhibited all the classic symptoms of urban decay. Structural problems were evident, with 47% of its 244 listed buildings classed as being “at risk” and 29% as “vulnerable.” There were calls for listed properties and whole streets to be razed, and investor confidence was low.

== Grainger Town project ==
=== Project information ===
In 1993, a property development and environmental enhancement program was started by Newcastle City Council and English Heritage. In 1996, Newcastle City Council, English Heritage and English Partnerships commissioned EDAW to produce a regeneration strategy for Grainger Town, intended to align the town with other major European regional capitals. The proposed project commenced in April 1997 and ended in March 2003, attracting over £174 million in funding, including £146 million from the private sector, which exceeded the estimated £74 million budget.

=== Major achievements ===
==== Union Rooms ====
JD Wetherspoons, a U.K. pub chain, spent 13 months restoring the French Renaissance style of the former Union Club opposite Newcastle station. When completed, the pub was renamed The Union Rooms. As a result of the restoration, architectural features, such as a 15 ft (4.6 m) high stained glass window and a large stained glass dome, were added to replace the original features that had fallen beyond repair.

==== 33-41 Grey Street ====
The building was built in 1835 by Grainger for the Bank of England and the Northumberland and Durham District Bank. The Grade II* listed building was restored with the help of a grant in 1997. Following extensive repairs, the building hosts a bar on the ground floor, and offices above.

==== The Gate ====
Land Securities developed a new 19,235 m^{2} (207,040 sq ft) retail and leisure complex, which opened in 2002. The Gate is a covered multi-level centre, with a glass facade, housing a multiplex cinema, a sky bar with views over the city, restaurants and a casino.

=== Other achievements ===
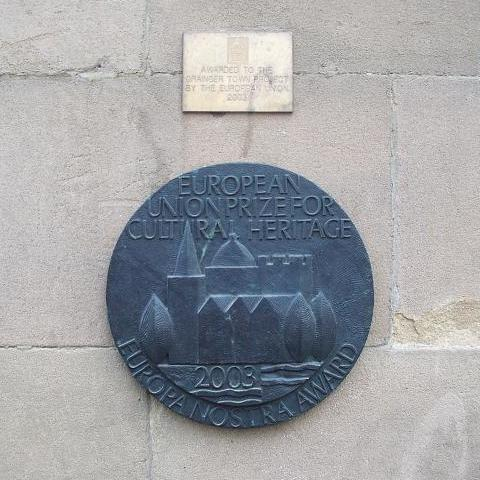
The Europa Nostra Award in 2003

- 1506 jobs created as well as a further 800 in Grainger Town from the increased confidence in the area.
- 286 new businesses.
- 80,900 m^{2} (871,000 sq ft) of new and/or improved commercial floor space.
- 121 buildings, many of them listed properties and classified as 'buildings at risk', restored for use.
- Grey's Monument repaired and cleaned.
- 289 flats and apartments completed with many located within the Grainger Street and Clayton Street areas.
- Westgate House, which was an eleven-story office block, was acquired by ONE North East and demolished between late 2006 and early 2007.
