= Central Arcade (disambiguation) =

Central Arcade is a shopping centre in Newcastle upon Tyne, England.

Central Arcade may also refer to:

- Central Arcade, Leeds, a shopping centre on Briggate in Leeds
- Central Arcade, Wolverhampton
