= The Victoria, Durham =

Historic public house

Coordinates: 54.772458°N 1.570865°W

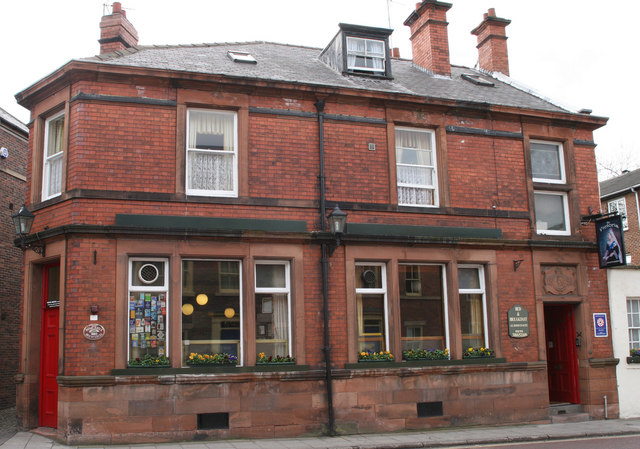
The Victoria

The Victoria is a Grade II listed public house at 86 Hallgarth Street, Durham DH1 3AS.

It was built in 1899 by the Newcastle architect Joseph Oswald. It is on the Campaign for Real Ale's National Inventory of Historic Pub Interiors.
