= Demolition (TV series) =

2005 British television series

Demolition is a 2005 television series from Channel 4, which can be seen as being the reverse of the BBC's 2003 series Restoration. The public were encouraged to vote for buildings which they want demolished and replaced, with 12 buildings making The Dirty Dozen.

The show was shown on four days, 17 to 20 December 2005, with the "Dirty Dozen" covered along with other buildings which did not make the final 12, two of which were actually demolished either during or for filming. The show on the 20th dealt almost entirely with Cumbernauld town centre. The show was presented and narrated by Kevin McCloud, with a Demolition Troubleshooter of Janet Street-Porter, and a team of architectural and heritage experts.

Since the program aired, 6 of the buildings have been demolished, while 3 have been renovated. One of the latter, Park Hill, Sheffield, is a grade II* listed building.

== The "Dirty Dozen" ==
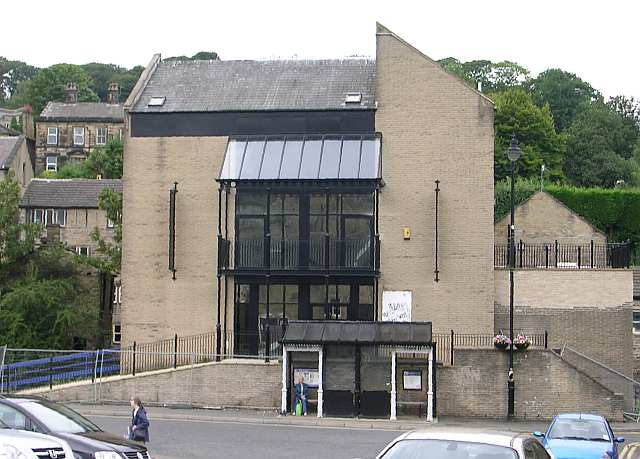
Lodge's supermarket

1. Cumbernauld town centre
2. The Waterfront, Bournemouth (demolished in 2013)
3. Northampton Greyfriars bus station (demolished in 2015)
4. Crown House, Kidderminster (demolished 2019–20)
5. Park Hill, Sheffield (under renovation 2009–present)
6. Rugby Cement works
7. Trinity Centre Multi-Storey Car Park, Gateshead (featured in the film Get Carter, demolished in 2010)
8. The Scottish Parliament Building
9. The Colliers Wood Tower (renovated 2014–16)
10. Lodge's Supermarket, Holmfirth (was derelict, but was renovated and reopened in 2008)
11. Number One, Westminster Bridge (demolished in 2006 and replaced by Park Plaza Westminster Bridge)
12. Westgate House, Newcastle upon Tyne (demolished in 2006–07)

Eight of the twelve buildings were built with brutalist architecture.
