= The Waterfront, Bournemouth =

Demolished leisure complex in Bournemouth, UK

The Waterfront
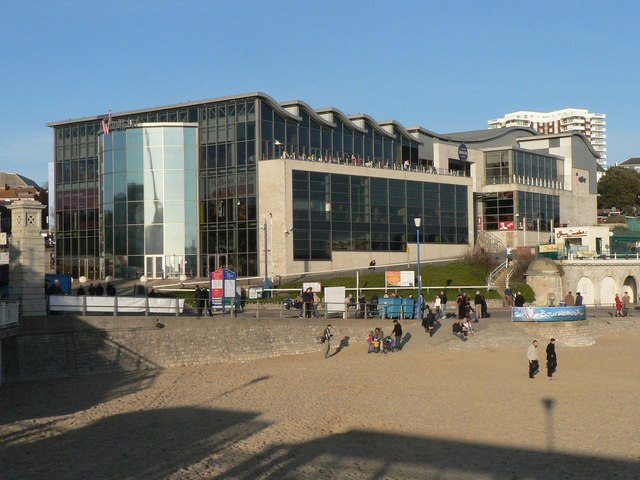
- Interactive map of the The Waterfront area

General information
- Status: Demolished
- Location: Bournemouth, UK
- Coordinates: 50°43′0.1″N 1°52′28.06″W
- Opened: 1999
- Demolished: 2013

The Waterfront was a leisure complex on the seafront in Bournemouth, England. It contained an IMAX cinema and restaurants.

== History ==
In January 1997, the Sheridan Group was awarded a contract to develop and operate the complex. The leaseholder was the Northern Ireland Local Government Officers' Superannuation Committee (Nilgosc).

The building opened in 1999 with several restaurants, however, the opening of the cinema was delayed.

The cinema opened in 2002, three years later than anticipated. It was designed to show 3D films but technical problems resulted in only 2D films being shown. By 2003, it only opened three days per week out of season. In March 2005, it was closed for renovations. However, in October 2005 it was announced that it would not reopen and that the landlord was looking for a new tenant. Sheridan subsequently launched a legal challenge against Nilgosc and the council discussed purchasing the building, but decided it was too expensive. In early 2010, the council purchased the building for around £7 million, approximately half the cost it would have been previously.

=== Criticism and demolition ===
The building was criticised for its large size which resulted in it blocking views of the seafront. In 2005, the TV series Demolition included the building in the top twelve buildings in the UK that viewers would like demolished.

In December 2010, plans to reduce the height of the building were announced. The council later stated it received no suitable bids for the work. In March 2012, the council announced plans to demolish the building. The following month, councillors voted in favour of demolition. Seats from the building were donated to the Shelley Theatre in Boscombe. Demolition began in February 2013.

The site was initially used as an outdoor events venue. On 31 July 2019, a crazy golf course called Smuggler's Cove opened on the site.
