= Westgate House, Newcastle upon Tyne =

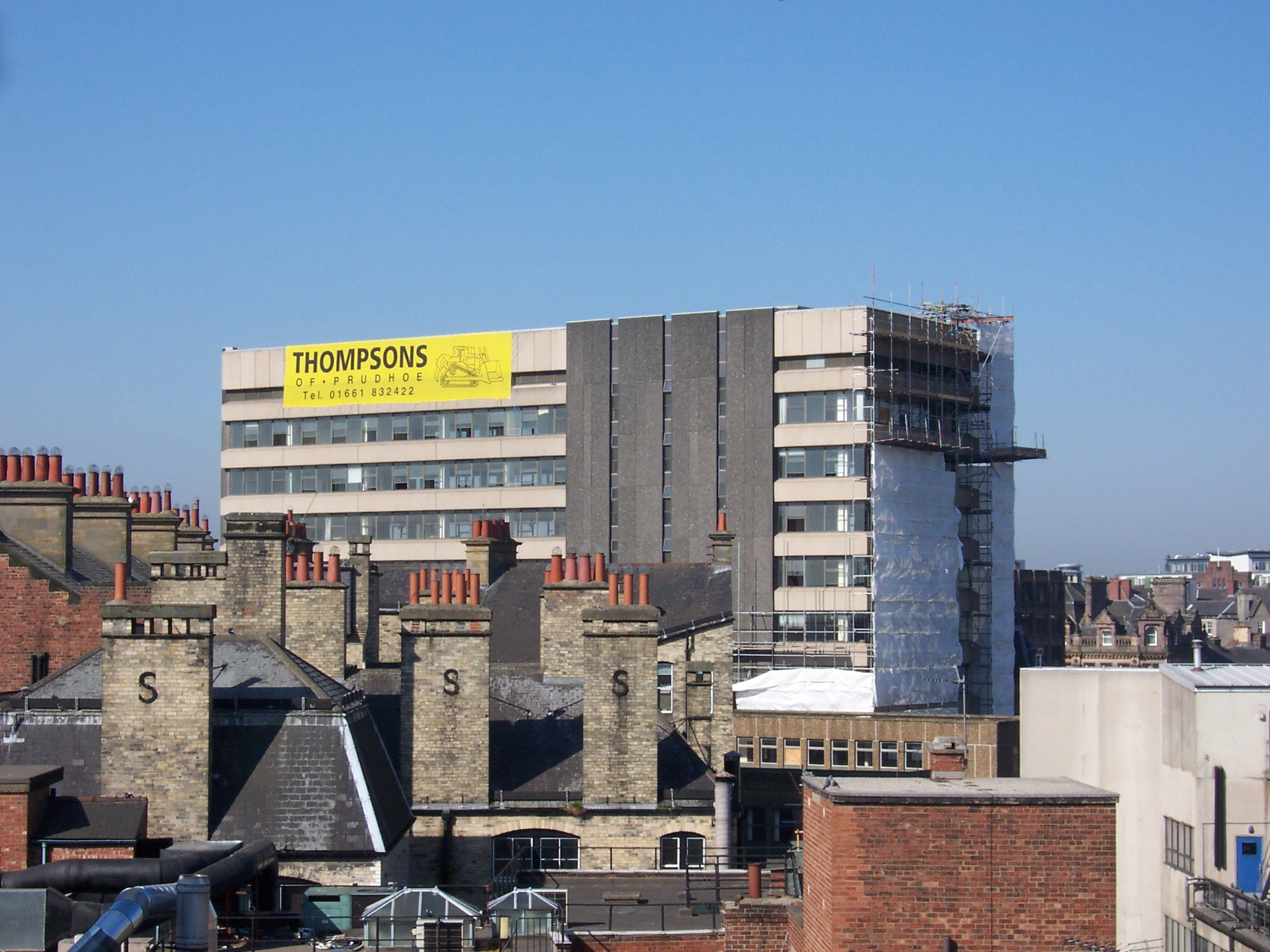

- Location within Tyne and Wear

General information
- Location: Grainger Town, Newcastle upon Tyne, England
- Coordinates: 54.969°N 1.615°W
- OS grid reference: NZ247639

Westgate House was a 46-metre (150 ft) office block that was situated on Westgate Road opposite Newcastle station in the Grainger Town of Newcastle upon Tyne, England. The 12-storey Brutalist building was completed in 1972 and was demolished in 2006–07.

The building straddled the eastern end of Westgate Road, and was designed to have the appearance of a "gateway" to the city centre. After being completed, it housed several government agencies. The last to use the building was the Citizens Advice Bureau, who were based on the ground floor until 2001.

According to the Evening Chronicle, by 2001 "it was well-established as one of the ugliest and most unpopular buildings on Tyneside". The vast concrete structure was particularly criticised for being out of place with the Victorian buildings around it. Westgate House was featured on the Channel 4 television series, Demolition, where it was voted as one of twelve buildings that deserved to be demolished. However, in BBC News Magazine, it was nominated as an 'unsung landmark'.

Developers OneNorthEast acquired the building in 2001 and initially considered renovating it as a hotel. In 2005, they and Newcastle City Council instead announced that the building would be demolished, with the work beginning in late 2006 and finishing in January 2007 allowing for the site's redevelopment. Westgate House had to be taken down piece by piece as neighbouring buildings were too close to allow for a controlled explosion. Demolition started off slowly at first as a result of the unique construction method used on the 11th floor, which was a plant room, and the 12th floor which was stronger than other floors because of the roof slab. Demolition was completed upon the removal of the 'stilts' at the base of the building.
