= Joseph Oswald =

English architect

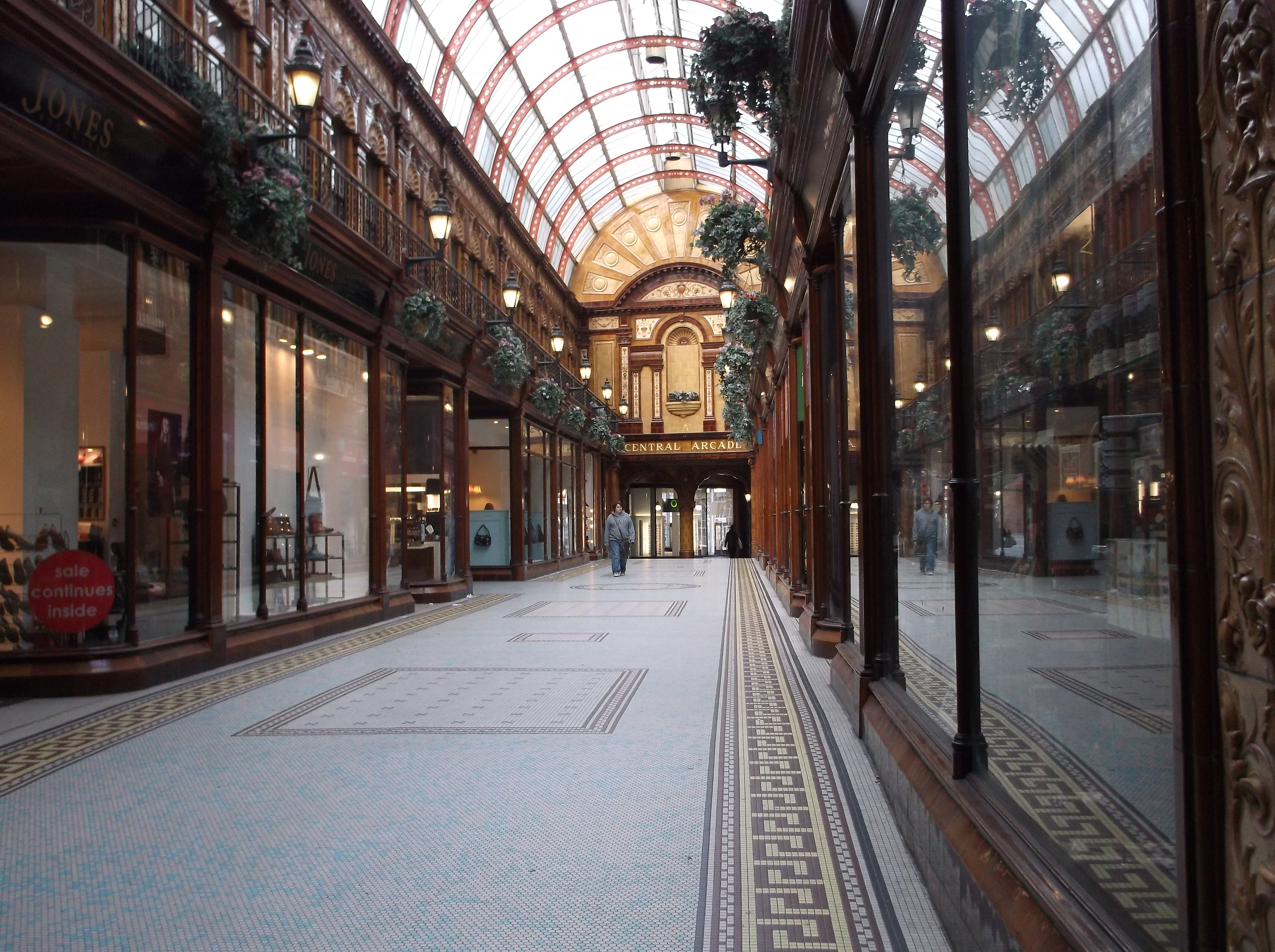
Central Arcade, Newcastle upon Tyne

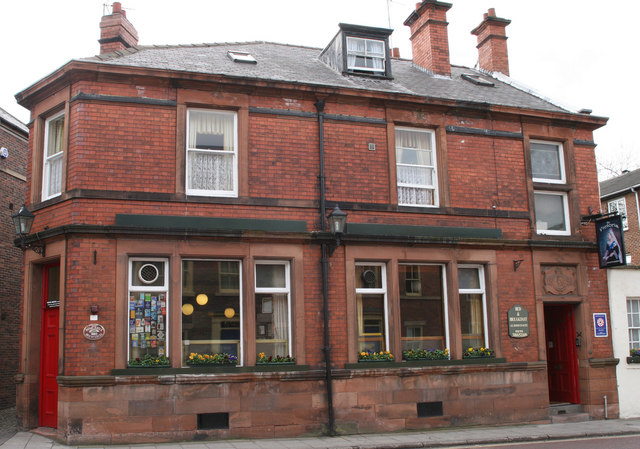
The Victoria, Durham

Joseph Oswald (19 March 1852, Carlisle – 15 January 1930, Newcastle upon Tyne) was an English architect.

== Early life ==
He was the son of fellow architect Septimus Oswald. He was educated at The Royal Grammar School, and then articled to his father, before becoming his assistant.

== S. Oswald & Son ==
From 1876 to 1891, he was in partnership with his father as S. Oswald & Son, and later with his son Harold Oswald (1874–1938).

His son Gilbert Oswald later joined the practice. After the death of Harold in 1938 and Gilbert in 1945, the practice was continued by various other partners including James Reid. The firm designed a number of public houses, and Harold Oswald specialised in designing race courses.

== Buildings ==
He was the architect of The Victoria, an 1899 Grade II listed public house at 86 Hallgarth Street, Durham DH1 3AS. It is on the Campaign for Real Ale's National Inventory of Historic Pub Interiors.

As well as designing pubs for Newcastle Breweries, he was the architect of their plush offices there in Haymarket in 1901, their stores and stables, and the city's Central Arcade.
