= Central Arcade, Newcastle upon Tyne =

Edwardian-era covered shopping centre

Central Arcade
- Interior of the arcade

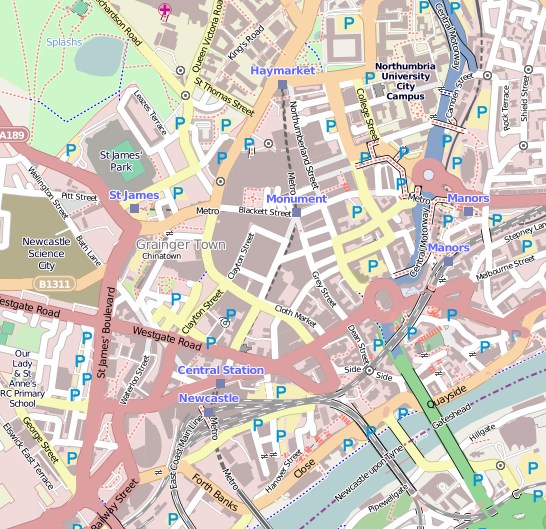
- Location within Newcastle-upon-Tyne

General information
- Location: Newcastle upon Tyne, England
- Coordinates: 54°58′24″N 1°36′48″W
- OS grid reference: NZ248643
- Year built: 1906

Listed Building – Grade II*
- Official name: Central Arcade
- Designated: 14 June 1954
- Reference no.: 1355247

The Central Arcade is a small shopping centre in Newcastle upon Tyne, England.

== History ==
The building is an Edwardian shopping arcade built in 1906 and designed by Oswald and Son, of Newcastle. It is in the Central Exchange building, which was built by Richard Grainger in 1836–38 to the designs of John Wardle and George Walker. The Central Arcade is Grade II* listed.

The Central Exchange is a triangular building which was intended to be a corn exchange but became a subscription newsroom. In 1870 the Institution for Promoting the Fine Arts converted the newsroom into an art gallery, concert hall and theatre.

This was replaced by a Vaudeville theatre in 1897, but in 1901 the interior was destroyed by fire, after which the current Central Arcade was built within the walls of the original building. The original flooring was executed by Rust's Vitreous Mosaics of Battersea, but has since been replaced. The faience tiles on the walls were manufactured by Burmantoft's of Leeds.

== Gallery ==
Interior of Central Arcade

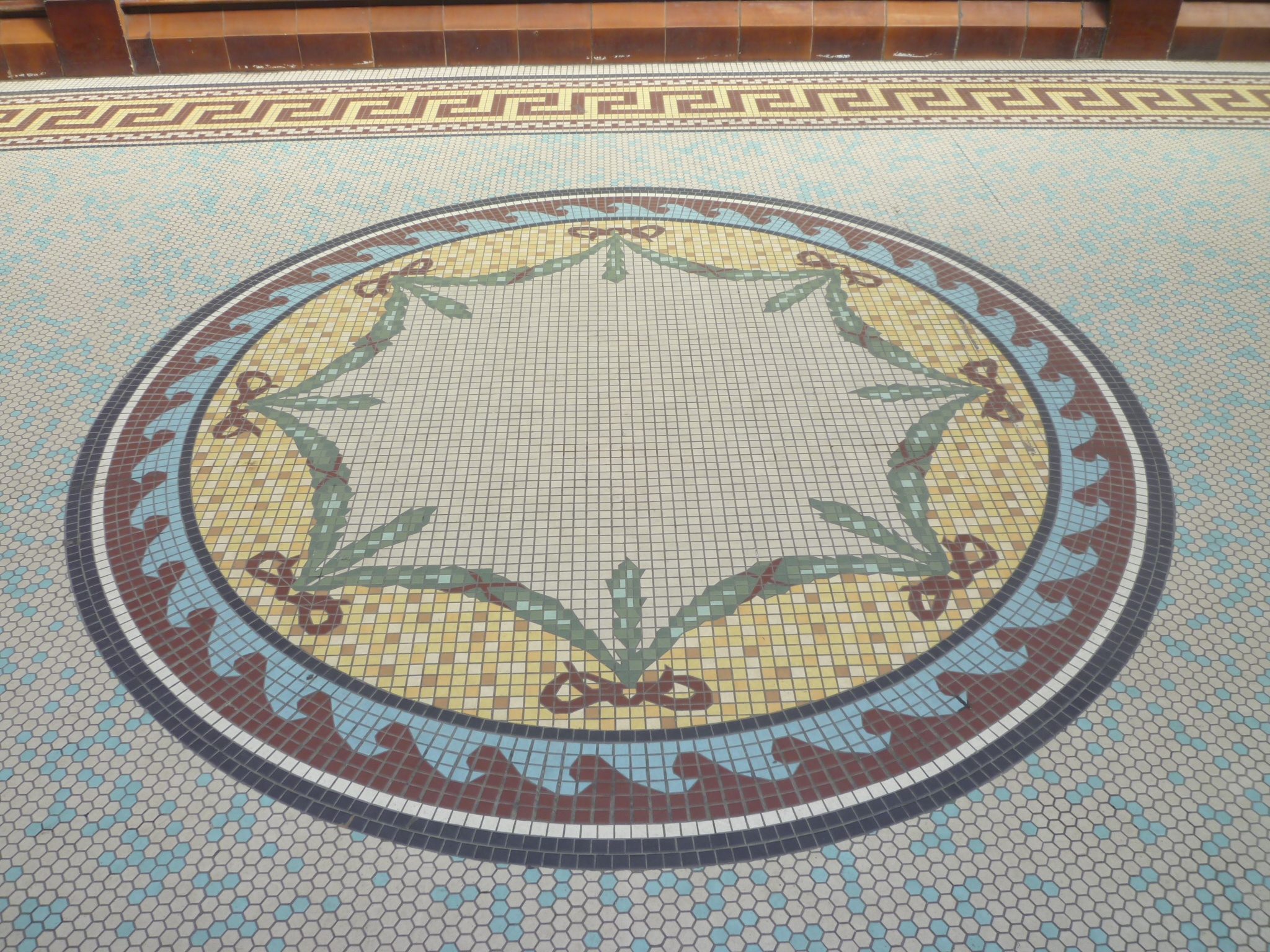
Floor of Central Arcade

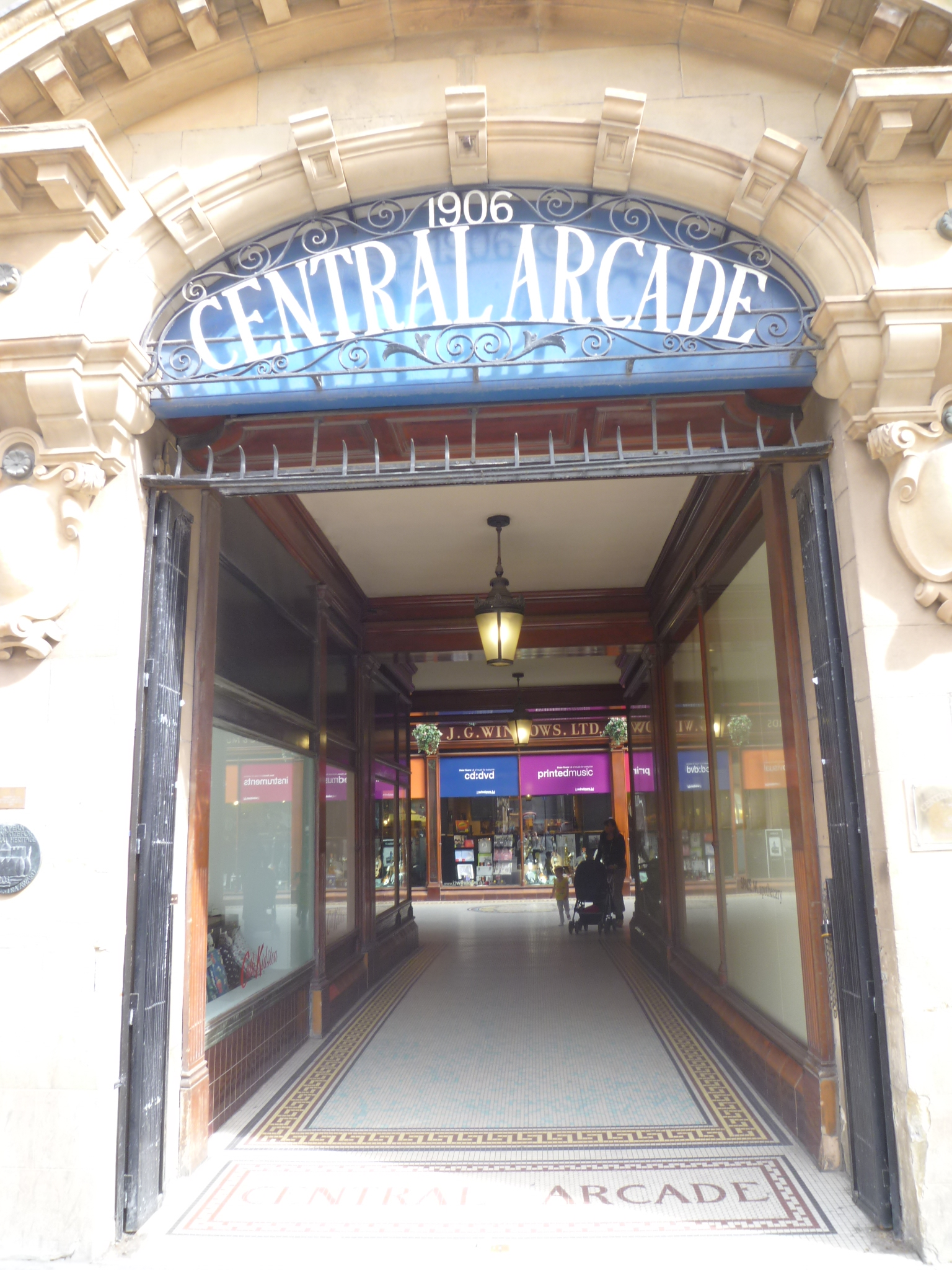
Entrance to Central Arcade

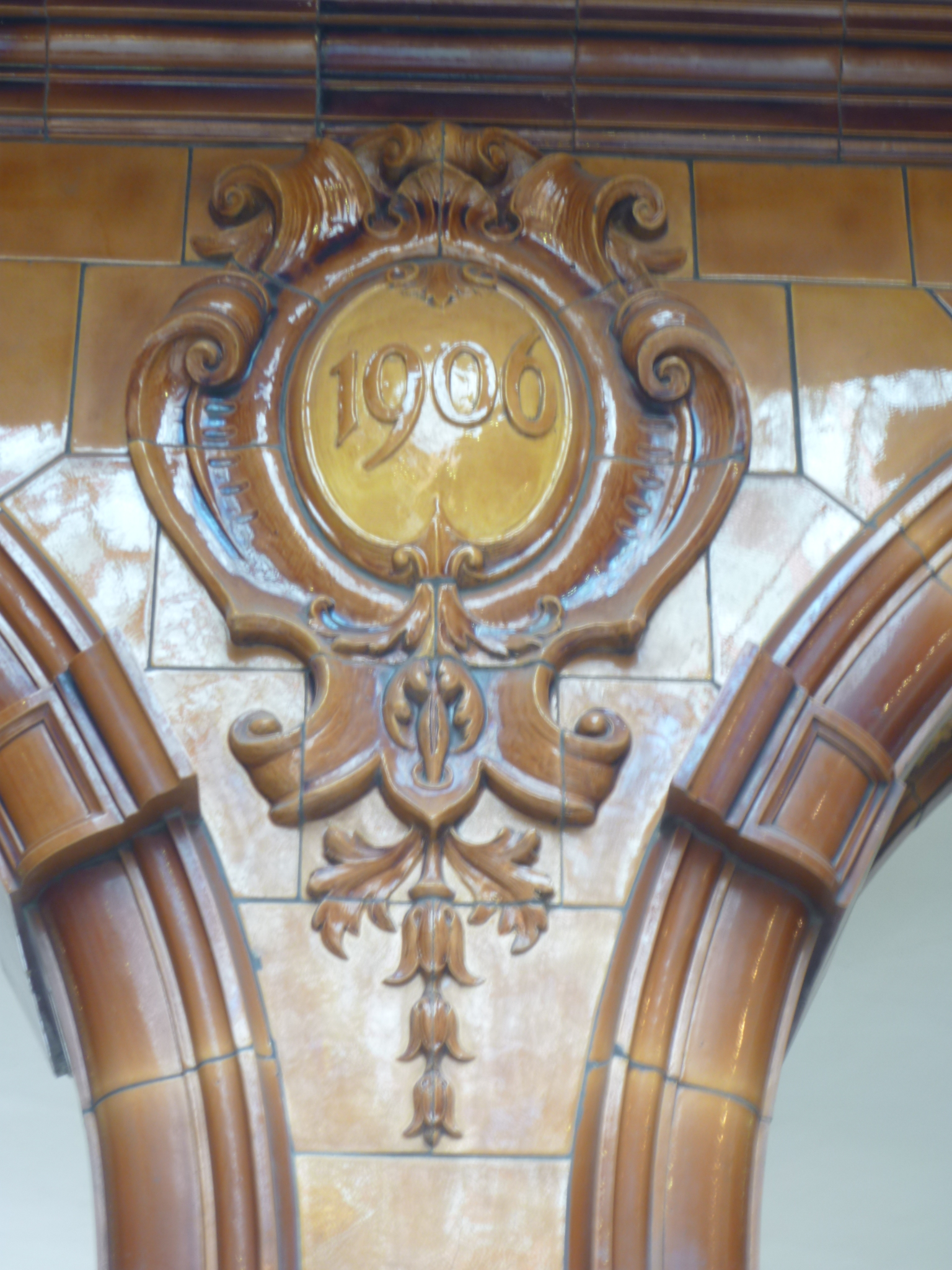
Date plaque in the Central Arcade

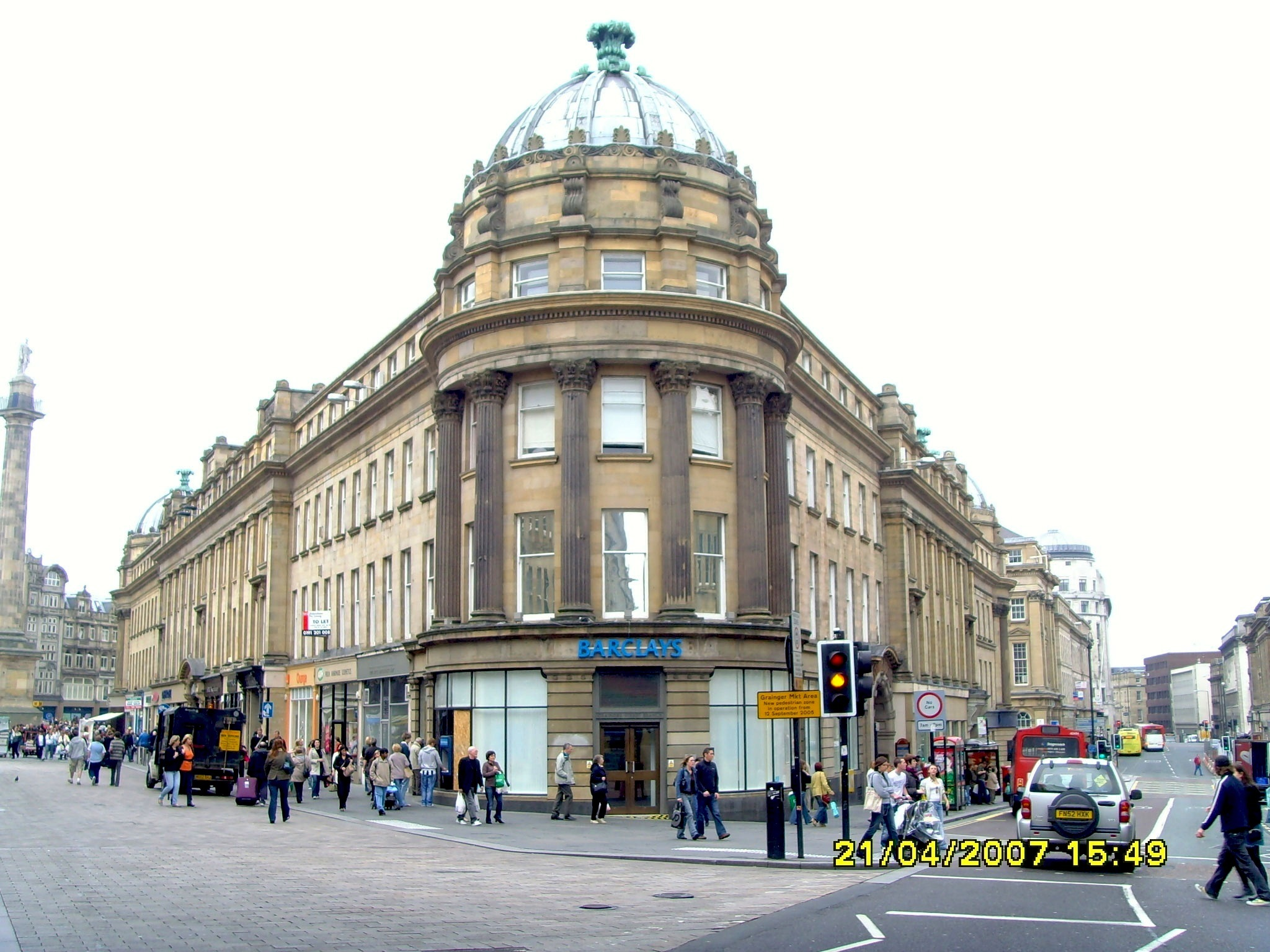
Central Exchange building on Grainger Street with Monument on left and Market Street on right.

== See also ==
- Grade II* listed buildings in Tyne and Wear
