= Grade II* listed buildings in Tyne and Wear =

Tyne and Wear shown within England

There are 208 Grade II* listed buildings in Tyne and Wear, England. Over a third of these are constituent parts of the Byker Wall housing estate, which is given its own sub-heading below.

== Gateshead ==
Name	Location	Type	Completed (Note: The date given is the date used by Historic England as significant for the initial building or that of an important part in the structure's description.)	Date designated	Grid ref. (Note: The grid reference is based on the British national grid reference system, sometimes known as OSGB36, used by the Ordnance Survey.) Geo-coordinates	Entry number (Note: The "List Entry Number" is a unique number assigned to each listed building and scheduled monument by Historic England.)	Image
Ravensworth Castle	Lamesley, Gateshead	Castle	1808	18 November 1985	NZ2321759094; 54°55′34″N 1°38′21″W	1025151	Ravensworth Castle More images
Ravensworth Castle	Lamesley, Gateshead	Tower	12th century	1 February 1967	NZ2327259118; 54°55′34″N 1°38′18″W	1025190	Ravensworth Castle More images
Axwell Park and steps and balustrades to south	Gateshead	House	1758	18 November 1985	NZ1911262042; 54°57′10″N 1°42′11″W	1025206	Axwell Park and steps and balustrades to south More images
Axwell Park Dower House	Gateshead	House	c. 1770–80	17 September 1984	NZ1962162444; 54°57′23″N 1°41′43″W	1184875	Upload Photo
Bradley Hall	Gateshead	Country House	c. 1760	21 January 1949	NZ1239163339; 54°57′52″N 1°48′29″W	1355110	Bradley Hall More images
Bridge over River Derwent (Tyne and Wear bridge No. 761)	Swalwell, Gateshead	Road Bridge	1779	18 November 1985	NZ1979462322; 54°57′19″N 1°41′33″W	1355119	Upload Photo
Church of St Chad	Gateshead	Church	1900–03	13 January 1983	NZ2497161700; 54°56′58″N 1°36′42″W	1277841	Church of St Chad More images
Church of St Helen	Gateshead	Parish Church	1876	13 January 1983	NZ2555960319; 54°56′13″N 1°36′09″W	1248532	Church of St Helen More images
Crow Hall	Felling, Gateshead	House	Early 18th century	26 April 1948	NZ2788461605; 54°56′54″N 1°33′58″W	1355083	Upload Photo
Dunston Hill Hospital	Gateshead	House	1667–1739	18 November 1985	NZ2208061254; 54°56′44″N 1°39′25″W	1366097	Upload Photo
Gibside	Gibside Estate, Gateshead	House	1603–20	1 February 1950	NZ1761558911; 54°55′28″N 1°43′36″W	1299730	Gibside More images
Haddon Tomb 6.5 metres north of transept of Church of St Mary	Heworth, Gateshead	Canopied Tomb	c. 1717	18 November 1985	NZ2867261941; 54°57′05″N 1°33′14″W	1355086	Haddon Tomb 6.5 metres north of transept of Church of St Mary
Heworth Constitutional Club, formerly Nether Heworth Hall	Gateshead	House	Early 18th century	26 April 1984	NZ2877661993; 54°57′06″N 1°33′08″W	1355084	Upload Photo
Orangery about 300 metres west and 260 metres south of Gibside	Gibside Estate, Gateshead	Orangery	Late 18th century	1 February 1950	NZ1728458606; 54°55′19″N 1°43′55″W	1299709	Orangery about 300 metres west and 260 metres south of Gibside More images
Stables to south east of Gibside	Gibside Estate, Gateshead	Stable	1746	1 February 1950	NZ1785658763; 54°55′24″N 1°43′23″W	1185328	Stables to south east of Gibside
Stephens Hall	Ryton, Gateshead	House	1653	18 November 1985	NZ1562062871; 54°57′37″N 1°45′27″W	1355113	Upload Photo
Swing Bridge over River Tyne	Gateshead	Gate	1868–76	30 July 2004	NZ2520663703; 54°58′02″N 1°36′28″W	1390930	Swing Bridge over River Tyne More images
The Rectory	Ryton, Gateshead	House	Post Medieval	21 January 1949	NZ1512464777; 54°58′39″N 1°45′55″W	1185232	The Rectory
Underhill	Gateshead	House	1860s	2 June 1976	NZ2622160626; 54°56′23″N 1°35′32″W	1248562	Underhill More images
Walker Terrace	Gateshead	Terrace	Early 19th century	26 April 1950	NZ2538062985; 54°57′39″N 1°36′19″W	1277835	Walker Terrace

== Newcastle upon Tyne ==
=== The Byker Wall development ===
Name	Location	Type	Completed	Date designated	Grid ref. Geo-coordinates	Entry number	Image
Nos. 1, 2 and 3 and attached ramps	Brinkburn Close, Byker, Newcastle upon Tyne	Flats	1972–75	22 January 2007	NZ2690864494; 54°58′28″N 1°34′52″W	1392123	Nos. 1, 2 and 3 and attached ramps
Nos. 1, 2 and 3, with attached fences, kerbs and seating	Fairless Garden, Byker, Newcastle upon Tyne	House	1974–76	22 January 2007	NZ2731864615; 54°58′31″N 1°34′29″W	1392176	Upload Photo
Nos. 1, 2 and 3, with attached walls and fences, and electric substation to rear of No. 1 Nos. 1–6, with attached walls and fences	Headlam Garden, Byker, Newcastle upon Tyne	House	1974–76	22 January 2007	NZ2730064620; 54°58′32″N 1°34′30″W	1392175	Upload Photo
Nos. 1, 3 and 5 and attached fences	Headlam Street, Byker, Newcastle upon Tyne	House	1974–76	22 January 2007	NZ2725564617; 54°58′32″N 1°34′33″W	1392173	Nos. 1, 3 and 5 and attached fences
Nos. 1–11 and attached garden walls Nos. 1–5 and attached garden walls Nos. 2–6 and attached garden walls Garages	Gordon Square, Byker, Newcastle upon Tyne	Housing Estate	1974–76	22 January 2007	NZ2681064359; 54°58′23″N 1°34′58″W	1392127	Upload Photo
Nos. 1–11 with kerbs to front and fences to rear	Winship Terrace, Byker, Newcastle upon Tyne	Housing Estate	1974–76	22 January 2007	NZ2735864654; 54°58′33″N 1°34′27″W	1392178	Nos. 1–11 with kerbs to front and fences to rear
Nos. 1–115, with attached fences, steps and timber heating ducts	Cheviot Mount, Byker, Newcastle upon Tyne	Flats	1978–80	22 January 2007	NZ2717564546; 54°58′29″N 1°34′37″W	1392162	Nos. 1–115, with attached fences, steps and timber heating ducts
Nos. 1–12, Felton House, with attached walls, fences and pergolas Nos. 1–8 (including shop), Headlam House with attached walls, fences and pergolas Nos. 1–43 Long Headlam Nos. 1–81 Felton Walk with attached walls, fences and pergolas St Lawrence RC Church, Spires Lane and attached church hall, Byker Crescent Nos. 1–28 Byker Crescent with attached walls, fences and pergolas	Byker, Newcastle upon Tyne	Flats	1972–75	22 January 2007	NZ2730564676; 54°58′33″N 1°34′30″W	1392166	Nos. 1–12, Felton House, with attached walls, fences and pergolas Nos. 1–8 (including shop), Headlam House with attached walls, fences and pergolas Nos. 1–43 Long Headlam Nos. 1–81 Felton Walk with attached walls, fences and pergolas St Lawrence RC Church, Spires Lane and attached church hall, Byker Crescent Nos. 1–28 Byker Crescent with attached walls, fences and pergolas
Nos. 1–13 Brock Street with attached steps and fences Nos. 2–8 Dibley Street with attached steps and fences	Byker, Newcastle upon Tyne	House	1974–76	22 January 2007	NZ2686864366; 54°58′23″N 1°34′54″W	1392129	Upload Photo
Nos. 1–15 with attached garden fences	Laverock Court, Byker, Newcastle upon Tyne	Flats	1976–78	22 January 2007	NZ2710864179; 54°58′17″N 1°34′41″W	1392139	Upload Photo
Nos. 1–17 (odd) and Nos. 2–30 (even), with attached walls, fences, pergola and steps Nos. 130 and 132, with attached walls, fences, pergola and steps	Michaelgate, Byker, Newcastle upon Tyne	Flats	1978–80	22 January 2007	NZ2724464510; 54°58′28″N 1°34′33″W	1392170	Upload Photo
Nos. 1–17 and attached fences and curbs	Brinkburn Street, Byker, Newcastle upon Tyne	Terrace	1972–75	22 January 2007	NZ2695564517; 54°58′28″N 1°34′50″W	1392114	Nos. 1–17 and attached fences and curbs
Nos. 1–17 with attached walls, steps and entry walkway	Bolam Coyne, Byker, Newcastle upon Tyne	Flats	1976–78	22 January 2007	NZ2711164104; 54°58′15″N 1°34′41″W	1392141	Upload Photo
Nos. 1–18 with attached garden fences	Ruddock Square, Byker, Newcastle upon Tyne	Flats	1976–78	22 January 2007	NZ2711064007; 54°58′12″N 1°34′41″W	1392143	Upload Photo
Nos. 1–20 The Brow with attached fences and bin stores	St Peter's Road, Byker, Newcastle upon Tyne	Flats	1978–81	22 January 2007	NZ2734664060; 54°58′13″N 1°34′28″W	1392146	Upload Photo
Nos. 1–20, with car porch and attached timber fences	Merle Gardens, Byker, Newcastle upon Tyne	Flats	1976–78	22 January 2007	NZ2710464026; 54°58′12″N 1°34′41″W	1392142	Upload Photo
Nos. 1–35 including attached walls, fences and gates	Low Fold, Byker, Newcastle upon Tyne	Housing Estate	1975–78	22 January 2007	NZ2649664486; 54°58′27″N 1°35′15″W	1392111	Upload Photo
Nos. 1–39 Mount Pleasant House and attached walls and fences	Headlam Street, Byker, Newcastle upon Tyne	Fence	1978–80	22 January 2007	NZ2721264629; 54°58′32″N 1°34′35″W	1392167	Nos. 1–39 Mount Pleasant House and attached walls and fences
Nos. 1–42 Headlam Green, including Chirton House, bowling green pavilion, garages, entrance gates, retaining walls and attached fences	Byker, Newcastle upon Tyne	Flats	1976–78	22 January 2007	NZ2733564469; 54°58′27″N 1°34′28″W	1392182	Upload Photo
Nos. 1–7 (odd) and Nos. 2–8 (even) with attached fences to the rear	Jane Street, Byker, Newcastle upon Tyne	Terrace	1978–80	22 January 2007	NZ2722564587; 54°58′31″N 1°34′34″W	1392169	Upload Photo
Nos. 1–7 Thornborrow House with fences to rear	Spires Lane, Byker, Newcastle upon Tyne	Flats	1974–76	22 January 2007	NZ2740564700; 54°58′34″N 1°34′24″W	1392179	Upload Photo
Nos. 1–8 and attached fences	Cushat Close, Byker, Newcastle upon Tyne	House	1976–78	22 January 2007	NZ2708964110; 54°58′15″N 1°34′42″W	1392140	Upload Photo
Nos. 18–22 with attached fences and garages to the rear Nos. 4, 5 and 6 with attached fences Nos. 7–21, with attached community centre to corner	Spires Lane, Byker, Newcastle upon Tyne	Flats	1974–76	22 January 2007	NZ2730064563; 54°58′30″N 1°34′30″W	1392174	Nos. 18–22 with attached fences and garages to the rear Nos. 4, 5 and 6 with attached fences Nos. 7–21, with attached community centre to corner
Nos. 2–38 with retaining walls	Kendal Street, Byker, Newcastle upon Tyne	Flats	1972–75	22 January 2007	NZ2684964481; 54°58′27″N 1°34′56″W	1392121	Nos. 2–38 with retaining walls
Nos. 2–46 and Nos. 62–92 Whickham Gardens	Byker, Newcastle upon Tyne	Flats	1978–81	22 January 2007	NZ2716364114; 54°58′15″N 1°34′38″W	1392150	Upload Photo
Nos. 2–64 with attached fences	Carville Rise, Byker, Newcastle upon Tyne	Flats	1978–80	22 January 2007	NZ2713064530; 54°58′29″N 1°34′40″W	1392161	Upload Photo
Nos. 66–84, with retaining walls, timber fences and steps to front	Carville Rise, Byker, Newcastle upon Tyne	House	1978–80	22 January 2007	NZ2715364470; 54°58′27″N 1°34′38″W	1392165	Upload Photo
Substation attached to No. 82 Raby Street Nos. 66–92 Raby Street Nos. 2–6 Priory Place No. 15 Priory Green	Byker, Newcastle upon Tyne	Terrace	1972–75	22 January 2007	NZ2704264504; 54°58′28″N 1°34′45″W	1392116	Upload Photo
Nos. 1–75 Dunn Terrace, including Graham House, Wolseley House, The Cabin and YMCA Byker Neighbourhood Youth Project. Includes: Nos. 1–66 Northumberland Terrace, including Salisbury House. Attached brick walls, timber fencing and dustbin shelters, and covered timber shelters outside No. 1 Dunn Terrace	Byker Estate, Newcastle upon Tyne	House	1975–78	22 January 2007	NZ2659664507; 54°58′28″N 1°35′10″W	1392611	Nos. 1–75 Dunn Terrace, including Graham House, Wolseley House, The Cabin and YMCA Byker Neighbourhood Youth Project. Includes: Nos. 1–66 Northumberland Terrace, including Salisbury House. Attached brick walls, timber fencing and dustbin shelters, and covered timber shelters outside No. 1 Dunn Terrace
Avondale House with attached fences, walls and steps	Raby Way, Byker, Newcastle upon Tyne	Flats	1979–82	22 January 2007	NZ2712564390; 54°58′24″N 1°34′40″W	1392156	Upload Photo
Byker Neighbourhood Estate Office	Brinkburn Street, Byker, Newcastle upon Tyne	Drawing Office	1969	22 January 2007	NZ2694564461; 54°58′27″N 1°34′50″W	1392128	Byker Neighbourhood Estate Office More images
Electricity sub-station	Brinkburn Street, Byker, Newcastle upon Tyne	Sub-station	1974–76	22 January 2007	NZ2694164386; 54°58′24″N 1°34′50″W	1392135	Electricity sub-station
Fixed seating and tables, and shelters No. 3 with attached walls, fences, table and seats Nos. 11 to 19 (odd), with attached walls and fences Nos. 12 to 18 (even), with attached walls and fences Nos. 20 and 21, with attached walls, fences and pergola to front	Benson Place, Byker, Newcastle upon Tyne	Bungalow	1976–78	22 January 2007	NZ2746064565; 54°58′30″N 1°34′21″W	1392190	Upload Photo
Lychgate in front of St Lawrence's School	Byker, Newcastle upon Tyne	Lych Gate	1969	15 September 2009	NZ2733664513; 54°58′28″N 1°34′28″W	1393440	Upload Photo
No. 1, with attached walls and fences	Old Vicarage Walk, Byker, Newcastle upon Tyne	Detached House	1976–78	22 January 2007	NZ2751064575; 54°58′30″N 1°34′18″W	1392189	Upload Photo
No. 6, attached walls, steps, seats, table and fences Nos. 1–9, with attached walls, steps and fences	Old Vicarage Walk, Byker, Newcastle upon Tyne	Terrace	1976–78	22 January 2007	NZ2744064567; 54°58′30″N 1°34′22″W	1392191	Upload Photo
No. 100, with attached fences to rear	Headlam Street, Byker, Newcastle upon Tyne	House	1978–80	22 January 2007	NZ2723264613; 54°58′31″N 1°34′34″W	1392168	Upload Photo
No. 32, with attached fence, walls and steps to churchyard	Michaelgate, Byker, Newcastle upon Tyne	Detached House	1978–80	22 January 2007	NZ2731264514; 54°58′28″N 1°34′29″W	1392171	Upload Photo
Nos. 1–17, with kerbs to front and attached fences	Spires Lane, Byker, Newcastle upon Tyne	House	1974–76	22 January 2007	NZ2737464629; 54°58′32″N 1°34′26″W	1392177	Nos. 1–17, with kerbs to front and attached fences
Nos. 1 and 2 St Lawrence Court, with attached fences and seats	Spires Lane, Byker, Newcastle upon Tyne	House	1974–76	22 January 2007	NZ2736364697; 54°58′34″N 1°34′27″W	1392180	Nos. 1 and 2 St Lawrence Court, with attached fences and seats
Nos. 11–25 (odd), with stone retaining wall to front and fences to rear	Chirton Wynd, Byker, Newcastle upon Tyne	House	1976–78	22 January 2007	NZ2744364463; 54°58′27″N 1°34′22″W	1392184	Upload Photo
Nos. 1–14 (consec), with attached fences, pergolas and seats Nos. 1–7 (consec), with attached fences, pergolas and seats Nos. 18–28 (consec), Jubilee Terrace Nos. 1–9 (odd), with attached fences, pergolas and seats	Manor House Close, Byker, Newcastle upon Tyne	House	1976–78	22 January 2007	NZ2747164446; 54°58′26″N 1°34′21″W	1392183	Upload Photo
Nos. 1–14 with attached meeting hall and garages	The Chevron, Byker, Newcastle upon Tyne	Flats	1974–76	22 January 2007	NZ2686964431; 54°58′26″N 1°34′54″W	1392126	Upload Photo
Nos. 1–17 (consec), with attached walls, fences, seats and pergolas	Jubilee Terrace, Byker, Newcastle upon Tyne	Fence	1976–78	22 January 2007	NZ2752564587; 54°58′31″N 1°34′17″W	1392187	Upload Photo
Nos. 1–18 (link blocks) with attached garden walls	Kendal House, Byker, Newcastle upon Tyne	Flats	1971–74	22 January 2007	NZ2680364556; 54°58′30″N 1°34′58″W	1392120	Nos. 1–18 (link blocks) with attached garden walls
Nos. 1–33, with attached walls, fences and pergolas	Bamburgh Terrace, Byker, Newcastle upon Tyne	Flats	1972–75	22 January 2007	NZ2746264665; 54°58′33″N 1°34′21″W	1392181	Upload Photo
Nos. 1–9 (odd) and Nos. 2–10 (even) with attached walls, fences, pergolas and seats Nos. 2 and 4 with attached walls, fences, pergolas and seats	Benson Place, Byker, Newcastle upon Tyne	Housing Estate	1976–78	22 January 2007	NZ2748264526; 54°58′29″N 1°34′20″W	1392188	Upload Photo
Nos. 2–28 (even), including shop, pergola and fences	Chirton Wynd, Byker, Newcastle upon Tyne	House	1976–78	22 January 2007	NZ2745964484; 54°58′27″N 1°34′21″W	1392185	Upload Photo
Nos. 239–251 with attached steps, walls and fences Nos. 1–13, with attached steps, ramps, walls and fences Nos. 187–205 with attached steps, ramps, walls and fences Nos. 2–18, with attached steps ramps, walls and fences Nos. 228–252 with attached steps, ramps, walls and fences	Janet Street, Byker, Newcastle upon Tyne	Flats	1970–71	22 January 2007	NZ2745763973; 54°58′11″N 1°34′22″W	1392145	Upload Photo
Nos. 30–40 (even), with retaining walls and fences	Chirton Wynd, Byker, Newcastle upon Tyne	House	1976–78	22 January 2007	NZ2741464512; 54°58′28″N 1°34′24″W	1392186	Upload Photo
Nos. 52–72, and attached fences and shed	Raby Way, Byker, Newcastle upon Tyne	Housing Estate	1979–82	22 January 2007	NZ2713064339; 54°58′23″N 1°34′40″W	1392158	Upload Photo
Nos. 10–22, including fences Nos. 8 and 10, including fences Nos. 1–12, including fences	Dibley Street, Byker, Newcastle upon Tyne	Bungalow	1974–76	22 January 2007	NZ2684864322; 54°58′22″N 1°34′56″W	1392132	Upload Photo
Nos. 1–14, with attached archway and ramp, and walls and fences to rear	Raby Crescent, Byker, Newcastle upon Tyne	Flats	1978–79	22 January 2007	NZ2705364592; 54°58′31″N 1°34′44″W	1392153	Nos. 1–14, with attached archway and ramp, and walls and fences to rear
Nos. 1–15, and attached fences	Houlet Grath, Byker, Newcastle upon Tyne	Flats	1976–78	22 January 2007	NZ2703064229; 54°58′19″N 1°34′45″W	1392152	Upload Photo
Nos. 1–23, and attached fences Nos. 2–12, and attached fences	Oban Gardens, Byker, Newcastle upon Tyne	House	1978–81	22 January 2007	NZ2722264160; 54°58′17″N 1°34′35″W	1392151	Upload Photo
Nos. 1–27, with attached garden fences and retaining brick walls and pergola Nos. 15 and 17, with attached garden fences and retaining brick walls and pergola	Dibley Street, Byker, Newcastle upon Tyne	Flats	1974–76	22 January 2007	NZ2691264368; 54°58′24″N 1°34′52″W	1392131	Upload Photo
Nos. 14–50 (even) with attached walls, archway and fences Nos. 23–53, with attached walls, archway and fences	Commercial Road, Byker, Newcastle upon Tyne	Housing Estate	1978–81	22 January 2007	NZ2726864158; 54°58′17″N 1°34′32″W	1392147	Upload Photo
Nos. 1–52, and attached walls, seats, fences, pergolas and steps Nos. 1–55, and attached walls, seats, fences, pergolas and steps Structure housing district heating system	Raby Gate, Byker, Newcastle upon Tyne	Flats	1971–74	22 January 2007	NZ2709064627; 54°58′32″N 1°34′42″W	1392154	Nos. 1–52, and attached walls, seats, fences, pergolas and steps Nos. 1–55, and attached walls, seats, fences, pergolas and steps Structure housing district heating system
Nos. 1–59, with attached walls and fences	Ayton Rise, Byker, Newcastle upon Tyne	House	1978–81	22 January 2007	NZ2726764098; 54°58′15″N 1°34′32″W	1392149	Upload Photo
Nos. 1–63, with attached walls, pergolas and fences	Avondale Rise, Byker, Newcastle upon Tyne	Flats	1979–82	22 January 2007	NZ2715164423; 54°58′25″N 1°34′39″W	1392164	Upload Photo
Nos. 2–44, with attached wall, pergola and fences to front and rear, including No. 26a (Byker photographic workshop)	Raby Way, Byker, Newcastle upon Tyne	Detached House	1978–79	22 January 2007	NZ2706864569; 54°58′30″N 1°34′43″W	1392160	Upload Photo
Nos. 2–92, with attached walls, fences and steps	St Michael's Mount, Byker, Newcastle upon Tyne	Flats	1979–82	22 January 2007	NZ2719364430; 54°58′25″N 1°34′36″W	1392163	Nos. 2–92, with attached walls, fences and steps
Nos. 39–79, with attached bin stores and sheds, and walls and fences to rear	Raby Street, Byker, Newcastle upon Tyne	Flats	1978–79	22 January 2007	NZ2705964495; 54°58′28″N 1°34′44″W	1392155	Nos. 39–79, with attached bin stores and sheds, and walls and fences to rear More images
Nos. 46 and 48 and attached fences to back	Raby Way, Byker, Newcastle upon Tyne	Detached House	1979–82	22 January 2007	NZ2711064429; 54°58′25″N 1°34′41″W	1392159	Upload Photo
Nos. 85–105, with attached fences	Raby Street, Byker, Newcastle upon Tyne	House	1979–82	22 January 2007	NZ2710364350; 54°58′23″N 1°34′41″W	1392157	Nos. 85–105, with attached fences More images
Swimming baths	Shipley Street, Byker, Newcastle upon Tyne	Bath House	1907	15 September 2009	NZ2697864627; 54°58′32″N 1°34′48″W	1393439	Swimming baths
Tom Collins House	Dunn Terrace, Byker, Newcastle upon Tyne	Flats	1976–78	22 January 2007	NZ2670464461; 54°58′27″N 1°35′04″W	1392110	Tom Collins House More images
Nos. 2–18 Garmondsway Nos. 2–14 Lilburn Close Nos. 1–9 Glanton Close Nos. 1–12 Finchale Terrace No. 1 Raby Street No. 1 Harbottle Street (all with attached walls and fences)	Byker, Newcastle upon Tyne	Housing Estate	1976–79	22 January 2007	NZ2717164045; 54°58′13″N 1°34′38″W	1392144	Upload Photo
Nos. 1–13 Shipley Place	Byker, Newcastle upon Tyne	Garage	1972–75	22 January 2007	NZ2694864601; 54°58′31″N 1°34′50″W	1392113	Upload Photo
Nos. 2–10 Brinkburn Lane Nos. 1–9 Brinkburn Lane	Byker, Newcastle upon Tyne	Flats	1972–75	22 January 2007	NZ2693464526; 54°58′29″N 1°34′51″W	1392125	Upload Photo
No. 61 Ayton Rise	Byker, Newcastle upon Tyne	House	1978–81	22 January 2007	NZ2736164160; 54°58′17″N 1°34′27″W	1392148	Upload Photo
Nos. 2, 4 and 6 Brock Street	Byker, Newcastle upon Tyne	Flats	1974–76	22 January 2007	NZ2683264344; 54°58′23″N 1°34′57″W	1392130	Upload Photo
Nos. 1–7 Brinkburn Place Nos. 1–5 Kendal Green	Byker, Newcastle upon Tyne	Flats	1972–75	22 January 2007	NZ2688864546; 54°58′29″N 1°34′53″W	1392124	Upload Photo
No. 94A Raby Street Nos. 94–142 Raby Street Nos. 1–11 Priory Place	Byker, Newcastle upon Tyne	Flats	1976–78	22 January 2007	NZ2705764397; 54°58′24″N 1°34′44″W	1392118	Upload Photo
Nos. 29–37 Dibley Street Nos. 1–9 Brinkburn Square Nos. 12–18 Brock Street	Byker, Newcastle upon Tyne	Bungalows	1974–76	22 January 2007	NZ2690364323; 54°58′22″N 1°34′53″W	1392134	Upload Photo
Nos. 1–25 Kendal Street	Byker, Newcastle upon Tyne	Flats	1972–75	22 January 2007	NZ2688564502; 54°58′28″N 1°34′53″W	1392122	Upload Photo
Nos. 10–14 Raby Cross	Byker, Newcastle upon Tyne	Flats	1976139212278	22 January 2007	NZ2712264197; 54°58′18″N 1°34′40″W	1392138	Upload Photo
Nos. 24–28 Dibley Street	Byker, Newcastle upon Tyne	Flats	1974–76	22 January 2007	NZ2689964290; 54°58′21″N 1°34′53″W	1392133	Upload Photo
Nos. 1–7 Kendal Place	Byker, Newcastle upon Tyne	Flats	1972–75	22 January 2007	NZ2685264501; 54°58′28″N 1°34′55″W	1392119	Upload Photo
Nos. 1–89 Gordon Road	Byker, Newcastle upon Tyne	Flats	1972–75	22 January 2007	NZ2692564446; 54°58′26″N 1°34′51″W	1392117	Nos. 1–89 Gordon Road More images
Nos. 1, 2 and 3 Grace Street	Byker, Newcastle upon Tyne	Flats	1974–76	22 January 2007	NZ2726564603; 54°58′31″N 1°34′32″W	1392172	Nos. 1, 2 and 3 Grace Street
Nos. 2–8 Raby Cross	Byker, Newcastle upon Tyne	Post Office	1976–78	22 January 2007	NZ2711364219; 54°58′19″N 1°34′41″W	1392137	Upload Photo
Nos. 1–7 Raby Cross	Byker, Newcastle upon Tyne	Flats	1978–81	22 January 2007	NZ2714264217; 54°58′19″N 1°34′39″W	1392136	Nos. 1–7 Raby Cross More images
Nos. 1–37 Clive Place	Byker Estate, Newcastle upon Tyne	Terrace	1975–78	22 January 2007	NZ2659764474; 54°58′27″N 1°35′10″W	1392112	Upload Photo
Nos. 56–64 Raby Street Nos. 1–19 Norfolk Square Nos. 1–14 Priory Green	Byker, Newcastle upon Tyne	Flats	1972–75	22 January 2007	NZ2698764535; 54°58′29″N 1°34′48″W	1392115	Upload Photo

=== Newcastle (except Byker) ===
Name	Location	Type	Completed	Date designated	Grid ref. Geo-coordinates	Entry number	Image
Border Minstrel Public House to north west of Brandling House	North Gosforth, Newcastle upon Tyne	Country House	1757	27 August 1952	NZ2482671290; 55°02′08″N 1°36′47″W	1024715	Border Minstrel Public House to north west of Brandling House More images
Caretaker's flat, Brandling House	Gosforth Park, North Gosforth, Newcastle upon Tyne	House	1757	27 August 1952	NZ2488771280; 55°02′08″N 1°36′44″W	1355322	Caretaker's flat, Brandling House
Gosforth House, now Brandling House, part of High Gosforth Park Club	Gosforth Park, North Gosforth, Newcastle upon Tyne	Country House	1755–64	27 August 1952	NZ2485171251; 55°02′07″N 1°36′46″W	1121859	Gosforth House, now Brandling House, part of High Gosforth Park Club
North Gosforth Chapel	North Gosforth, Newcastle upon Tyne	Chapel	1296	30 March 1987	NZ2463370108; 55°01′30″N 1°36′58″W	1355323	North Gosforth Chapel More images
Woolsington Hall and wall attached to north west	Woolsington, Newcastle upon Tyne	House	Mid to late 17th century	27 August 1952	NZ1994570831; 55°01′54″N 1°41′22″W	1123737	Woolsington Hall and wall attached to north west More images
Austin Friary Tower attached to the John George Joicey Museum	Newcastle upon Tyne	Friary	13th century	14 June 1954	NZ2524764191; 54°58′18″N 1°36′26″W	1355203	Austin Friary Tower attached to the John George Joicey Museum More images
Central Arcade	Newcastle upon Tyne	Lamp Bracket	1906	14 June 1954	NZ2485464347; 54°58′23″N 1°36′48″W	1355247	Central Arcade More images
Chapel of St Mary	Newcastle upon Tyne	Chapel	Early to mid-12th century	14 June 1954	NZ2593466524; 54°59′33″N 1°35′46″W	1325172	Chapel of St Mary More images
Christ Church and hall attached	Shieldfield Green, Newcastle upon Tyne	Church Hall	1859–61	14 June 1954	NZ2554064599; 54°58′31″N 1°36′09″W	1024748	Christ Church and hall attached More images
Church of St James with Hall, Sunday School and house attached	Newcastle upon Tyne	Church Hall	1882–84	30 March 1987	NZ2512464839; 54°58′39″N 1°36′32″W	1024820	Church of St James with Hall, Sunday School and house attached More images
Church of St Matthew	Newcastle upon Tyne	Parish Church	1877	14 June 1954	NZ2383864141; 54°58′17″N 1°37′45″W	1024757	Church of St Matthew More images
Church of St Michael and presbytery attached	Newcastle upon Tyne	Priests House	1889–91	17 December 1971	NZ2314763509; 54°57′56″N 1°38′24″W	1024743	Church of St Michael and presbytery attached More images
Church of St Thomas the Martyr	Newcastle upon Tyne	Church	1825–30	14 June 1954	NZ2487764909; 54°58′41″N 1°36′46″W	1024952	Church of St Thomas the Martyr More images
Church of the Holy Trinity	Newcastle upon Tyne	Parish Church	1908	17 December 1971	NZ2614666023; 54°59′17″N 1°35′35″W	1024942	Church of the Holy Trinity More images
Civic Centre	Newcastle upon Tyne	Banqueting House	1956	16 November 1995	NZ2505864947; 54°58′43″N 1°36′36″W	1242692	Civic Centre More images
Customs House	Quayside, Newcastle upon Tyne	Custom House	1766	17 December 1971	NZ2540063913; 54°58′09″N 1°36′17″W	1325530	Customs House More images
Derwent Water Chambers	Newcastle upon Tyne	Jettied House	17th century	14 June 1954	NZ2518863868; 54°58′08″N 1°36′29″W	1120904	Derwent Water Chambers More images
Education Committee Distribution Centre office (Ouseburn Schools)	Newcastle upon Tyne	School	1893	17 December 1971	NZ2651764248; 54°58′20″N 1°35′14″W	1024947	Education Committee Distribution Centre office (Ouseburn Schools)
Emerson Chambers	Newcastle upon Tyne	Shop	c. 1903	30 March 1987	NZ2482964466; 54°58′27″N 1°36′49″W	1024923	Emerson Chambers More images
Entrance archway, pair of chapel lodges, walls and gates to Jesmond Cemetery	Newcastle upon Tyne	Gate	1836	14 June 1954	NZ2569865562; 54°59′02″N 1°36′00″W	1186766	Entrance archway, pair of chapel lodges, walls and gates to Jesmond Cemetery
Exchange Buildings	Newcastle upon Tyne	Exchange	c. 1840	14 June 1954	NZ2487564338; 54°58′23″N 1°36′47″W	1138984	Exchange Buildings More images
Hancock Museum of Natural History	Newcastle upon Tyne	Museum	1878	17 December 1971	NZ2485765169; 54°58′50″N 1°36′47″W	1024951	Hancock Museum of Natural History More images
La Sagesse School, Jesmond Towers	Newcastle upon Tyne	House	Early 19th century (before 1817)	17 December 1971	NZ2549167122; 54°59′53″N 1°36′11″W	1024954	Upload Photo
Lemington Cone	Lemington, Newcastle upon Tyne	Glass Works	Early 17th century	4 June 1976	NZ1836164572; 54°58′32″N 1°42′53″W	1299389	Lemington Cone More images
Literary and Philosophical Society	Newcastle upon Tyne	Library	1822	14 June 1954	NZ2481363925; 54°58′10″N 1°36′50″W	1121954	Literary and Philosophical Society More images
Lloyd's Bank	Newcastle upon Tyne	House	c. 1839	14 June 1954	NZ2491864355; 54°58′23″N 1°36′44″W	1024880	Lloyd's Bank More images
Neville Hall and Wood Memorial Hall	Newcastle upon Tyne	Library	1869–72	12 November 1965	NZ2479363932; 54°58′10″N 1°36′51″W	1024739	Neville Hall and Wood Memorial Hall More images
No. 20 and building to rear (No. 18 now demolished)	South Street, Newcastle upon Tyne	Boiler House	c. 1849–59	30 September 1983	NZ2472863678; 54°58′02″N 1°36′55″W	1120815	No. 20 and building to rear (No. 18 now demolished) More images
Old Assembly Rooms	Newcastle upon Tyne	Assembly Rooms	1774–76	14 June 1954	NZ2460764061; 54°58′14″N 1°37′02″W	1355256	Old Assembly Rooms More images
Ouseburn Viaduct with accommodation arch	Newcastle upon Tyne	Railway Viaduct	1837–39	12 November 1965	NZ2614664720; 54°58′35″N 1°35′35″W	1120788	Ouseburn Viaduct with accommodation arch More images
George Stephenson Memorial	Newcastle upon Tyne	Statue	1862	12 November 1965	NZ2474763955; 54°58′11″N 1°36′54″W	1338572	George Stephenson Memorial More images
South African War Memorial	Newcastle upon Tyne	War Memorial	1907	12 November 1965	NZ2481164862; 54°58′40″N 1°36′50″W	1024847	South African War Memorial More images
South lodge, gateway, walls and gates to Jesmond Cemetery	Newcastle upon Tyne	Gate	1836	14 June 1954	NZ2578265485; 54°59′00″N 1°35′55″W	1024860	South lodge, gateway, walls and gates to Jesmond Cemetery
St Mary's Training College administration block and chapel	Newcastle upon Tyne	House	1748	17 December 1971	NZ2211065418; 54°58′58″N 1°39′22″W	1320395	St Mary's Training College administration block and chapel
St Mary's Training College lecture room block	Newcastle upon Tyne	Courtyard	1907	17 December 1971	NZ2203865398; 54°58′58″N 1°39′26″W	1024897	St Mary's Training College lecture room block
Statue of Queen Victoria	Newcastle upon Tyne	Statue	c. 1900	30 March 1987	NZ2496164031; 54°58′13″N 1°36′42″W	1024771	Statue of Queen Victoria More images
Statue of Queen Victoria on front lawn of Royal Victoria Infirmary	Newcastle upon Tyne	Terrace	1906	30 March 1987	NZ2443664939; 54°58′42″N 1°37′11″W	1024801	Statue of Queen Victoria on front lawn of Royal Victoria Infirmary More images
The John George Joicey Museum (formerly Holy Jesus Hospital)	Newcastle upon Tyne	Museum	1987	14 June 1954	NZ2522564177; 54°58′18″N 1°36′27″W	1116207	The John George Joicey Museum (formerly Holy Jesus Hospital) More images
The Keelmen's Hospital	Newcastle upon Tyne	Courtyard	1701	14 June 1954	NZ2554564178; 54°58′18″N 1°36′09″W	1024902	The Keelmen's Hospital More images
The Red House	Newcastle upon Tyne	House	17th century	14 June 1954	NZ2519263877; 54°58′08″N 1°36′29″W	1024778	The Red House More images
The Turk's Head Hotel	Newcastle upon Tyne	House	c. 1837	12 November 1965	NZ2490464262; 54°58′20″N 1°36′45″W	1329950	The Turk's Head Hotel More images
Tiffany's Club (west part)	Newcastle upon Tyne	House	c. 1825	14 June 1954	NZ2517164528; 54°58′29″N 1°36′30″W	1024815	Tiffany's Club (west part)
Trinity House	Newcastle upon Tyne	House	1954	14 June 1954	NZ2535363993; 54°58′12″N 1°36′20″W	1116390	Trinity House
Trinity House No. 12 (school) and wall and railings attached	Newcastle upon Tyne	Gate	1753	30 March 1987	NZ2537063982; 54°58′11″N 1°36′19″W	1116373	Trinity House No. 12 (school) and wall and railings attached
Nos. 11 and 13 Shakespeare Street	Newcastle upon Tyne	House	1837	17 December 1971	NZ2497864313; 54°58′22″N 1°36′41″W	1024783	Nos. 11 and 13 Shakespeare Street
Nos. 1 and 3 Grey Street	Newcastle upon Tyne	House	c. 1835	12 November 1965	NZ2501064102; 54°58′15″N 1°36′39″W	1024871	Nos. 1 and 3 Grey Street More images
Nos. 61–67 Grey Street	Newcastle upon Tyne	House	c. 1837	14 June 1954	NZ2491164245; 54°58′20″N 1°36′45″W	1024876	Nos. 61–67 Grey Street
No. 32 Close	Newcastle upon Tyne	Jettied House	15th century	14 June 1954	NZ2503863762; 54°58′04″N 1°36′38″W	1024916	No. 32 Close More images
Nos. 33–41 Grey Street	Newcastle upon Tyne	Office	1954	14 June 1954	NZ2495064173; 54°58′18″N 1°36′42″W	1024873	Nos. 33–41 Grey Street More images
Nos. 55–59 Grey Street	Newcastle upon Tyne	House	c. 1837	12 November 1965	NZ2491964235; 54°58′20″N 1°36′44″W	1024875	Nos. 55–59 Grey Street More images
Nos. 1 and 3 Market Street	Newcastle upon Tyne	House	c. 1837	14 June 1954	NZ2497064333; 54°58′23″N 1°36′41″W	1087018	Nos. 1 and 3 Market Street
Nos. 86–90 Grainger Street	Newcastle upon Tyne	House	c. 1837	12 November 1965	NZ2478664218; 54°58′19″N 1°36′52″W	1115146	Nos. 86–90 Grainger Street More images
Nos. 19–31 Grey Street	Newcastle upon Tyne	House	c. 1835	12 November 1965	NZ2497064146; 54°58′17″N 1°36′41″W	1139024	Nos. 19–31 Grey Street More images
No. 53 Grey Street	Newcastle upon Tyne	House	c. 1837	12 November 1965	NZ2492264216; 54°58′19″N 1°36′44″W	1138998	No. 53 Grey Street More images
Nos. 5–13 Grey Street	Newcastle upon Tyne	House	c. 1835	12 November 1965	NZ2499364121; 54°58′16″N 1°36′40″W	1139021	Nos. 5–13 Grey Street More images
Nos. 108 and 110 Grainger Street	Newcastle upon Tyne	House	c. 1836	12 November 1965	NZ2480864262; 54°58′21″N 1°36′50″W	1320572	Nos. 108 and 110 Grainger Street
Nos. 52–78 Grey Street	Newcastle upon Tyne	House	c. 1836	12 November 1965	NZ2496464216; 54°58′19″N 1°36′42″W	1318917	Nos. 52–78 Grey Street More images
Nos. 39 and 40 Sandhill	Newcastle upon Tyne	Jettied House	17th century	14 June 1954	NZ2517763853; 54°58′07″N 1°36′30″W	1323105	Nos. 39 and 40 Sandhill More images
Nos. 43 and 45 Grey Street	Newcastle upon Tyne	House	c. 1837	12 November 1965	NZ2493564195; 54°58′18″N 1°36′43″W	1329921	Nos. 43 and 45 Grey Street
Nos. 1–4 Eldon Square	Newcastle upon Tyne	House	1825–31	14 June 1954	NZ2478764487; 54°58′28″N 1°36′51″W	1355254	Nos. 1–4 Eldon Square More images
Nos. 80–96 Grey Street	Newcastle upon Tyne	House	c. 1836	12 November 1965	NZ2494364262; 54°58′20″N 1°36′43″W	1355249	Nos. 80–96 Grey Street More images
Nos. 15 and 17 Grey Street	Newcastle upon Tyne	House	c. 1835	12 November 1965	NZ2498164133; 54°58′16″N 1°36′41″W	1024872	Upload Photo
Nos. 112–118 Grainger Street	Newcastle upon Tyne	House	c. 1836	12 November 1965	NZ2481464276; 54°58′21″N 1°36′50″W	1024869	Nos. 112–118 Grainger Street More images
Nos. 47–51 Grey Street	Newcastle upon Tyne	House	c. 1837	12 November 1965	NZ2493164203; 54°58′19″N 1°36′43″W	1024874	Nos. 47–51 Grey Street More images
Nos. 12, 14 and 16 Cloth Market	Newcastle upon Tyne	House	Late 16th century	30 March 1987	NZ2493664088; 54°58′15″N 1°36′43″W	1355229	Nos. 12, 14 and 16 Cloth Market More images
Nos. 36 and 38 Sandhill	Newcastle upon Tyne	House	17th century	17 December 1971	NZ2518263862; 54°58′07″N 1°36′29″W	1355313	Nos. 36 and 38 Sandhill
Nos. 55 and 57 Westgate Road	Newcastle upon Tyne	House	c. 1750	17 December 1971	NZ2461063986; 54°58′12″N 1°37′02″W	1024740	Nos. 55 and 57 Westgate Road More images
No. 35 Close	Newcastle upon Tyne	House	Later than 16th century	29 June 1976	NZ2505663705; 54°58′02″N 1°36′37″W	1024918	No. 35 Close More images
Nos. 68–72 Grainger Street	Newcastle upon Tyne	House	c. 1836	12 November 1965	NZ2477064171; 54°58′18″N 1°36′53″W	1115411	Nos. 68–72 Grainger Street More images
Newcastle and District War Memorial	Newcastle upon Tyne	War memorial	1923	12 November 1965	NZ2472664491; 54°58′28″N 1°36′55″W	1115605	Newcastle and District War Memorial More images

== North Tyneside ==
Name	Location	Type	Completed	Date designated	Grid ref. Geo-coordinates	Entry number	Image
Accumulator tower in Albert Edward Dock	North Tyneside	Machinery	1882	19 February 1986	NZ3530266941; 54°59′45″N 1°26′59″W	1354990	Accumulator tower in Albert Edward Dock More images
British Gas Research Station including attached restaurant block to south	Killingworth, North Tyneside	Workshop	1966–67	27 January 1997	NZ2684671409; 55°02′11″N 1°34′53″W	1259313	British Gas Research Station including attached restaurant block to south More images
Chapel and crematorium at Whitley Bay Cemetery	North Tyneside	Cemetery Chapel	1913	9 May 2003	NZ3456674468; 55°03′49″N 1°27′37″W	1096121	Chapel and crematorium at Whitley Bay Cemetery
Church of St Peter	North Tyneside	Parish Church	1809	18 August 1947	NZ3097466708; 54°59′38″N 1°31′03″W	1025326	Church of St Peter More images
Cliff House	Cullercoats, North Tyneside	House	c. 1768	23 December 1971	NZ3641871461; 55°02′11″N 1°25′54″W	1299734	Cliff House More images
Clifford's Fort south and east wall facing river	North Tyneside	Wall	1672	19 February 1986	NZ3636368553; 55°00′37″N 1°25′59″W	1185263	Clifford's Fort south and east wall facing river
Clifford's Fort west and south west wall	North Tyneside	Wall	1672	19 February 1986	NZ3628868461; 55°00′34″N 1°26′03″W	1025359	Upload Photo
Collingwood Monument and guns	Tynemouth, North Tyneside	Cannon	1845	19 February 1986	NZ3718169069; 55°00′53″N 1°25′12″W	1355011	Collingwood Monument and guns More images
Dial Cottage	North Tyneside	House	1986	27 February 1950	NZ2747270427; 55°01′39″N 1°34′18″W	1025392	Dial Cottage More images
Tynemouth station main and subsidiary buildings with canopies and footbridge	Tynemouth, North Tyneside	Footbridge	c. 1882	2 November 1978	NZ3664269343; 55°01′02″N 1°25′43″W	1185168	Tynemouth station main and subsidiary buildings with canopies and footbridge More images

== South Tyneside ==
Name	Location	Type	Completed	Date designated	Grid ref. Geo-coordinates	Entry number	Image
Bede Cottage and Bede House and attached outbuilding	Monkton, South Tyneside	House	Early to mid-17th century	18 January 1949	NZ3212463751; 54°58′02″N 1°29′59″W	1186029	Bede Cottage and Bede House and attached outbuilding
Cleadon House	Cleadon, South Tyneside	House	1738 (possibly)	25 February 1949	NZ3707161738; 54°56′56″N 1°25′22″W	1025212	Cleadon House More images
Monkton Farmhouse	Monkton, South Tyneside	Farmhouse	Mid-18th century	18 January 1949	NZ3202163669; 54°58′00″N 1°30′05″W	1355094	Monkton Farmhouse More images
Scots House	West Boldon, South Tyneside	House	Early 18th century	25 February 1949	NZ3271960973; 54°56′32″N 1°29′27″W	1185728	Upload Photo
Souter Point Lighthouse and attached buildings	Whitburn, South Tyneside	Workers Cottage	1871	26 February 1985	NZ4080764169; 54°58′14″N 1°21′51″W	1185593	Souter Point Lighthouse and attached buildings More images
West Boldon Hall	West Boldon, South Tyneside	House	1709	25 February 1949	NZ3505960982; 54°56′32″N 1°27′15″W	1025226	Upload Photo

== Sunderland ==
Name	Location	Type	Completed	Date designated	Grid ref. Geo-coordinates	Entry number	Image
Chimney to west of boiler house at Ryhope Pumping Station	Ryhope, Sunderland	Water Pumping Station	1866–69	19 June 1974	NZ4036252454; 54°51′55″N 1°22′22″W	1207133	Chimney to west of boiler house at Ryhope Pumping Station
Church of St George with Trinity and St James with hall, walls and gates	Sunderland	Church	1888–90	17 October 1994	NZ3955256279; 54°53′59″N 1°23′05″W	1279916	Church of St George with Trinity and St James with hall, walls and gates More images
Church of St Michael	Sunderland	Minster	c. 1807	10 November 1978	NZ3928556953; 54°54′21″N 1°23′20″W	1207993	Church of St Michael More images
Doxford House, Sunderland Polytechnic hall of residence with conservatory	Silksworth, Sunderland	House	c. 1820	25 February 1949	NZ3753552785; 54°52′06″N 1°25′00″W	1279879	Doxford House, Sunderland Polytechnic hall of residence with conservatory More images
Engine house and boiler house at Ryhope Pumping Station	Ryhope, Sunderland	Boiler House	1866–69	19 June 1974	NZ4038052462; 54°51′55″N 1°22′21″W	1218116	Engine house and boiler house at Ryhope Pumping Station
Fulwell Mill	Fulwell, Sunderland	Windmill	Earlier	10 November 1978	NZ3919159469; 54°55′42″N 1°23′24″W	1207109	Fulwell Mill More images
Houghton Hall Young Mens Christian Association	Houghton-le-Spring, Sunderland	Manor House	Early 17th century	26 April 1950	NZ3443649814; 54°50′31″N 1°27′55″W	1184920	Upload Photo
Houghton-le-Spring area offices of Sunderland District Council	Houghton-le-Spring, Sunderland	Vicarage	Early 17th century	26 April 1950	NZ3408249832; 54°50′32″N 1°28′15″W	1184817	Upload Photo
Kepier Grammar School	Houghton-le-Spring, Sunderland	Flats	1950	26 April 1950	NZ3424749885; 54°50′33″N 1°28′06″W	1025443	Upload Photo
Monkwearmouth Museum of Land Transport with walls, footbridge, waiting room	Sunderland	Station Masters House	1848	8 May 1950	NZ3961057671; 54°54′44″N 1°23′01″W	1209029	Monkwearmouth Museum of Land Transport with walls, footbridge, waiting room More images
Mountain Daisy Public House	Sunderland	Public House	1901	2 February 1994	NZ3835457033; 54°54′24″N 1°24′12″W	1279894	Upload Photo
Old South Pier Lighthouse in Roker Cliff Park	Sunderland	Lighthouse	1856	10 November 1978	NZ4071759796; 54°55′52″N 1°21′58″W	1218440	Old South Pier Lighthouse in Roker Cliff Park More images
The Empire Theatre	Sunderland	Statue	1906–07	10 November 1978	NZ3926957047; 54°54′24″N 1°23′21″W	1279891	The Empire Theatre More images
Victoria Railway Bridge	Sunderland	Railway Bridge	1838	15 July 1985	NZ3201454540; 54°53′05″N 1°30′09″W	1354978	Victoria Railway Bridge More images
No. 10 Church Street East	Sunderland	House	Early 18th century	8 May 1950	NZ4050357307; 54°54′32″N 1°22′11″W	1279470	No. 10 Church Street East More images
No. 11 Church Street East	Sunderland	House	Early 18th century	8 May 1950	NZ4050957298; 54°54′32″N 1°22′11″W	1207069	Upload Photo

== Former listed buildings ==
Name	Location	Type	Completed	Date designated	Grid ref. Geo-coordinates	Notes	Entry number	Image
Giant crane at former Nem Works	Wallsend on Tyne, North Tyneside	Crane	1909	22 February 1989	NZ3122266171; 54°59′21″N 1°30′49″W	De-listed and demolished in the early 1990s following a public enquiry.	1253566	Giant crane at former Nem Works
