= Doxford =

Doxford may refer to:

- Doxford Park, a suburb of Sunderland, Tyne and Wear, England; also the name of a wooded area of land located within the suburb
- Doxford House, mansion in the Silksworth area of Sunderland
- Doxford International Business Park in Sunderland
- William Doxford & Sons, a British shipbuilding company and maker of marine diesel engines

== See also ==
- Duxford
