= Peter Yates (disambiguation) =

Peter Yates (1928–2011) was a film director.

Peter Yates may also refer to:

- Peter W. Yates (1747–1826), colonel in the Continental Army and New York legislator
- Peter Yates (architect) (1920–1982), English artist and architect
- Peter Yates (athlete) (born 1958), English athlete
