= HM Customs =

Former customs department of the UK

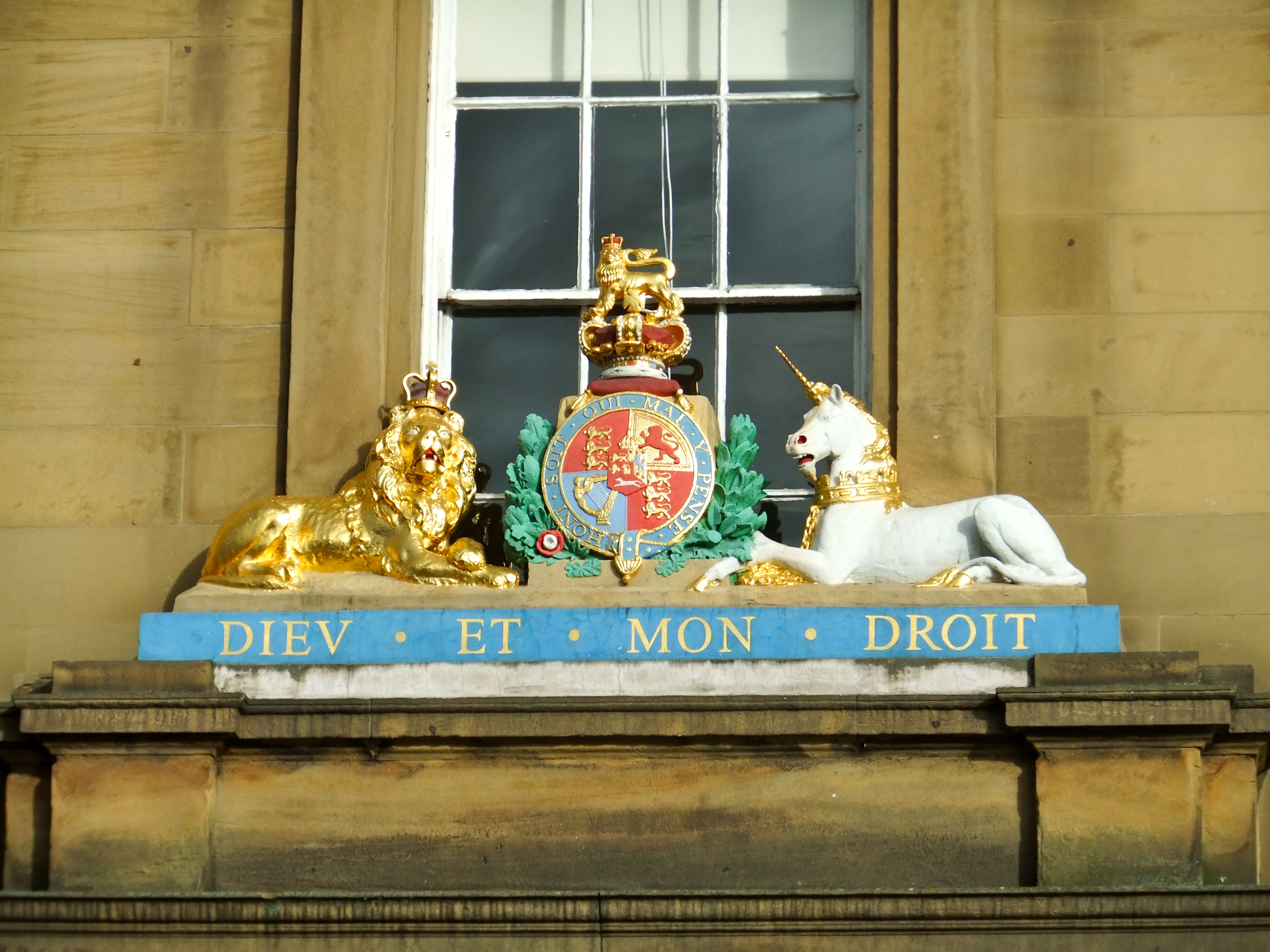
- Hanoverian royal coat of arms displayed on Newcastle's Custom House.

Non-ministerial government department overview
- Formed: 13th century
- Dissolved: 1909
- Superseding Non-ministerial government department: HM Customs and Excise
- Jurisdiction: England, Great Britain, United Kingdom
- Headquarters: Custom House, City of London

HM Customs (His or Her Majesty's Customs) was the national Customs service of England (and then of Great Britain from 1707, the United Kingdom from 1801) until a merger with the Department of Excise in 1909. The phrase 'HM Customs', in use since the Middle Ages, referred both to the customs dues themselves and to the office of state established for their collection, assessment and administration.

The payment of customs duty (i.e. a levy on imported or exported goods) has been recorded in Britain for well over a thousand years. A centralised system for their collection has been in place since the 13th century, overseen since the 17th century by a Board of Commissioners (the Board of Customs). In 1909, HM Customs was merged with the Excise department (responsible for raising revenue from inland taxes) to create HM Customs and Excise (HMCE), responsible for all forms of indirect taxation. Just under a century later, HMCE was itself merged with the Inland Revenue (responsible for direct taxation) to create HM Revenue and Customs.

== Operation ==
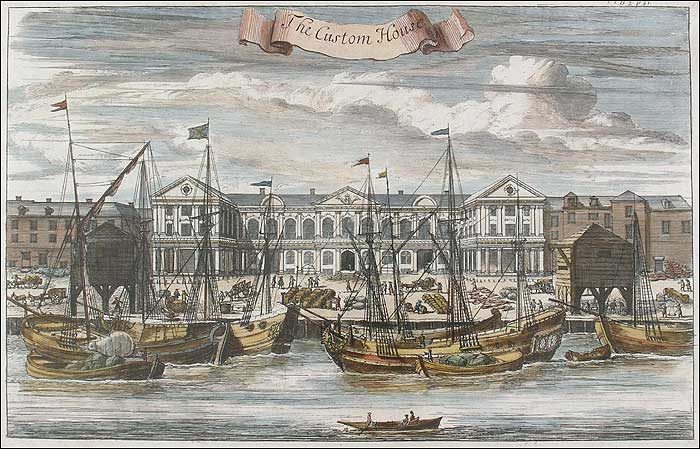
Vessels moored at London's Custom House in 1755

HM Customs officers operated almost exclusively in and from the coastal ports of England and Wales (and later Scotland and Ireland). By the start of the 19th century HM Customs had Custom Houses in 75 ports in England and Wales; each Custom House was staffed by a pair of Collectors, who received payments and supervised the other local officers, who focused mainly on the examination of cargo, its assessment for duty and the prevention of evasion (e.g. smuggling).

While revenue collection and protection was the Customs officers' principal task, several other responsibilities were accrued over centuries in relation to maritime law enforcement. As the principal government representatives in England's (later Britain's) ports, customs officers were involved in the regulation of salvage, quarantine, immigration, emigration, fisheries, trade and embargoes, as well as in the collecting of statistics and various other activities.

The Port of London was Britain's (for some time the world's) largest port and its Custom House in Lower Thames Street served as the headquarters of HM Customs. Alongside large numbers of local officers, the building accommodated officials and clerks responsible for national administration and oversight; the Board of Customs was based there from the time of its establishment in the 17th century.

The main public space in each Custom House, known as the Long Room, was where traders and others presented themselves to make the required payment of duties and fees on cargo destined for export or import. (The concept of a 'Long Room' dates from Sir Christopher Wren's rebuilding of London's Custom House in 1668-71). Prior to the establishment of shipping exchanges, the Long Room was, by default, the prime meeting place in each port where the owners and masters of ships could negotiate on trade and other matters with local merchants and others.

== History ==
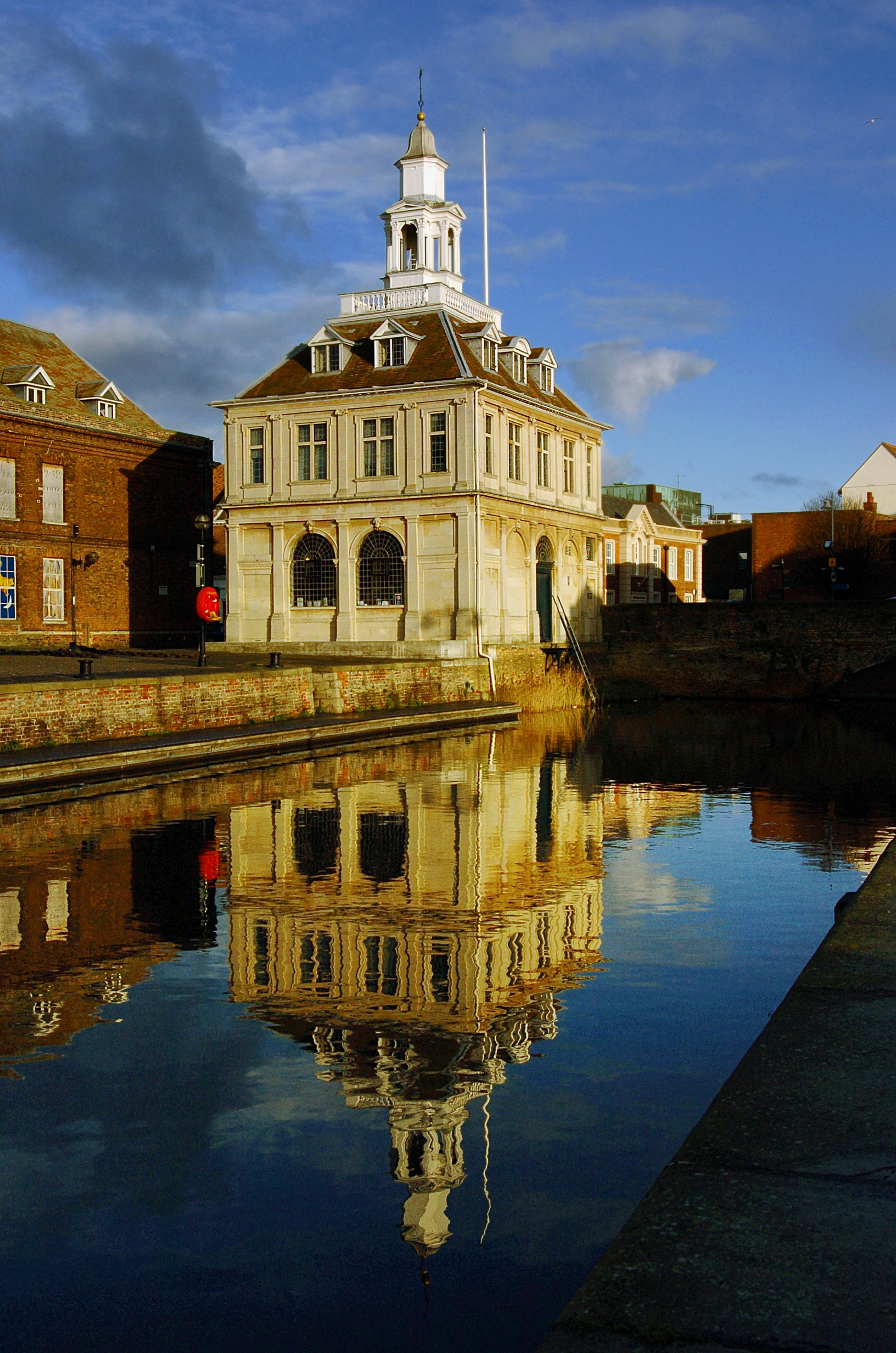
The Custom House, King's Lynn. It served as the port's customs office from 1683-1989.

The levying of Customs duties in Britain (by officers appointed to the task) has been part of national life for many centuries. In 1215 Magna Carta asserted that merchants travelling to and from England should expect to pay the rectae et antiquae consuetudinae ('ancient and rightful customs').

=== Origins ===
The first written reference to a Customs-type payment in England is found in a charter of King Aethelbald of Mercia issued in AD 743 to Worcester Abbey, granting them the dues of two ships collected at the Hythe of London. There is evidence from as early as AD 979 of import duties being collected at what was then the City of London's principal wharf at Billingsgate (close to what would later be the site of London's Custom House); variable rates of duty are listed, based on the size of vessel and its port of origin as well as on its cargo: at this time, duty appears to have been payable on imported wood, wine and fish, as well as on cloth, cheese, butter and eggs. Subsequently, there are references to various Customs-like duties, including lastage, scavage and cornage, the details of which are unclear. The tax on imported wine called Prise initially involved a proportion of the beverage itself being surrendered for use at the King's table; it subsequently developed into a financial payment.

Originally, the term customs meant any customary payments or dues of any kind (for example, to the king, or a bishop, or the church), but later became restricted to duties payable to the king on the import or export of goods. The beginnings of a centralised English customs system can be traced to the Winchester Assize of Customs of 1203, in the reign of King John, which established procedures by which customs duty (at the rate of one fifteenth on all goods imported or exported) would be collected and paid direct to the State Treasury (rather than to local sheriffs or feudal lords) and accounted for by the Exchequer. Between 1203 and 1205 this duty was collected at thirty-five English ports; however there is no evidence of its collection continuing after 1210.

=== The Middle Ages ===
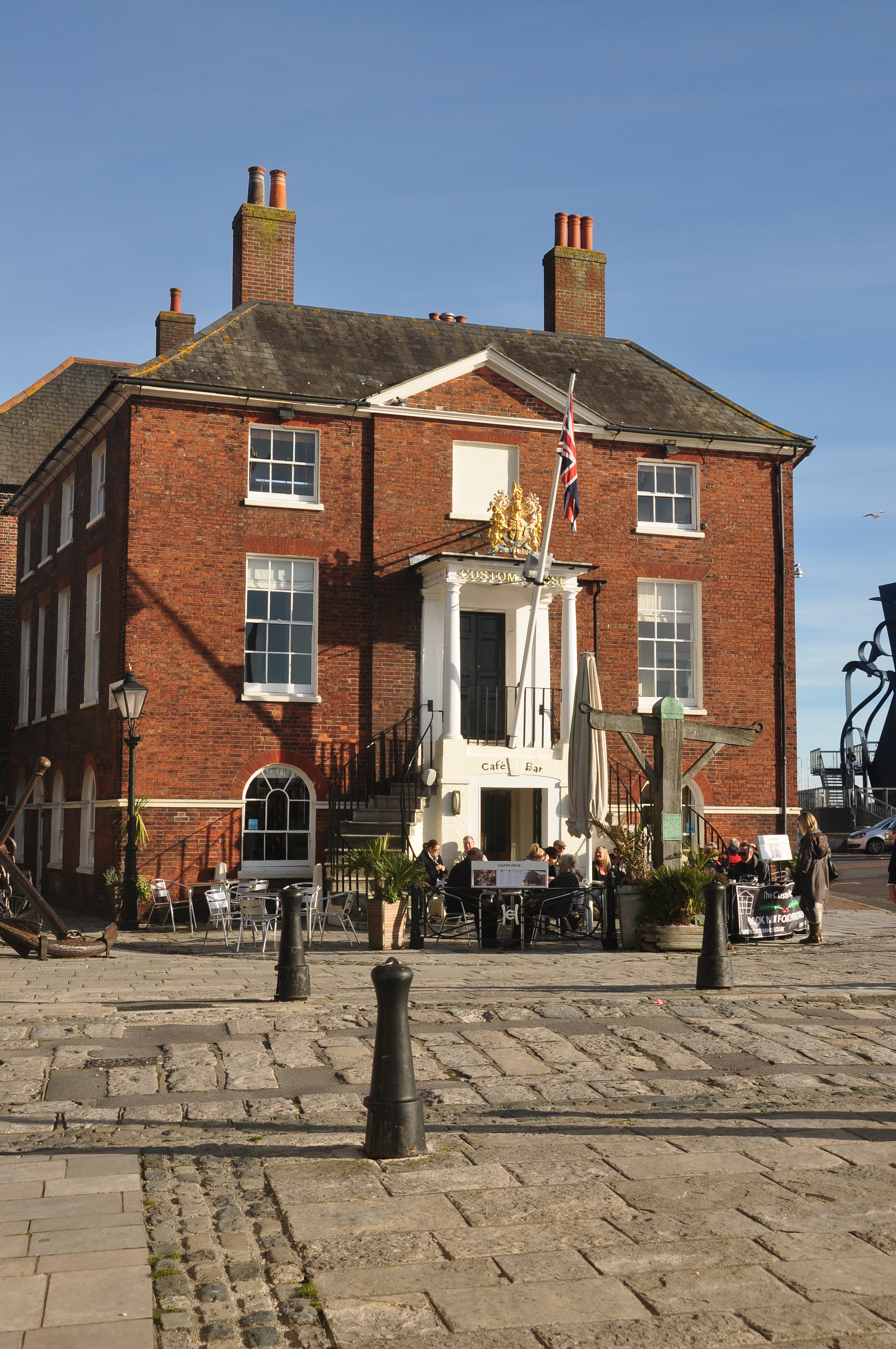
A medieval 'King's Beam' for weighing wool is still in place outside the former Custom House, Poole.

Legislation establishing a more permanent system of customs can be traced to an Act of Parliament of King Edward I known as the nova custuma or 'new customs' of 1275 (more formally: the Grant of Custom on exported Wool, Woolfells and Hides). Under the Act, in any port so designated by the King, two Collectors of Customs were to be appointed by Royal patent, along with a Controller to maintain a counter-roll (to exercise financial control). Their authority was signified by the cocket: a two-part seal which certified payment of duty, one half of which was held by the Collectors, the other by the Controller. For any sizeable port, the grant of a cocket to its appointed Customs officers was important as it signified that it was a legitimate place for the landing and loading of goods for international trade. Merchants were required to present themselves at a designated office (known as a Custom House) to make the required payments; at each Custom House a large set of scales (known as the 'King's Beam') was installed for weighing wool in order to calculate the duty owed (in the 13th-14th century some 98% of customs revenue came from the export duty on wool).

In 1297 'Customers' (custodes custumae) were appointed in certain ports (viz. Boston, Bristol, Hull, Ipswich, London, Newcastle, Southampton and Yarmouth); they had overall responsibility for receiving and safeguarding money from the Collectors, ensuring its safe transfer from the ports to the City of London and making payments locally where instructed to do so by the Exchequer. Two years later, officers called Searchers were appointed in each port to arrest anyone dealing in counterfeit money, to examine all goods for import or export and to ascertain that the correct duty had been paid. In 1303 the first 'Surveyor' was appointed, having oversight of several ports; the Surveyors supervised the work of the Searchers, to ensure parity of practice across different locations. In each port, the Collectors, Controller and Searchers were required to render individual accounts to the Exchequer. Thus, by the end of the 13th century, a principle was established which has remained in force (with some modifications) to the present day: that of separation between the assessment of goods, the collection of revenue and the checking of accounts.

During this period (through until the mid-17th century) customs dues were farmed (i.e. leased to speculators in return for an annual rent). The 'farmers' usually appointed the Collectors (often from among the local merchants in each port) whereas the Controller was the King's officer (and had usually served as a minor official in the King's court). One of the local landed gentry would often serve as Customer, as they possessed the staff and vehicles required to ensure the safe transport of money received; however, with these appointments being made by Letters Patent, often for life (and sometimes with rights of inheritance), the patentee was able to employ a deputy to do the work while still collecting the (often substantial) fees associated with the post. In this way, the office of Customer soon developed into something of a sinecure; it was eventually abolished (along with various other 'patent' posts) in 1798.

Alongside the nova custuma, levied on exported wool and leather, there were two notable forms of duty on imported goods: 'tonnage', dating from 1347 (a fixed rate payable on each cask or 'tun' of imported wine) and 'poundage', dating from 1302 (an ad valorem tax of one shilling in the pound (i.e. 5%) levied on other imported or exported goods). These were initially raised as a temporary measure (for defence of the realm) by agreement with the merchants, but in 1373 legislation was passed making them permanent; from 1414 the associated revenue was granted directly to the Crown. Tonnage and poundage was the largest source of Customs revenue until its abolition in 1787.

=== Early Modern period ===
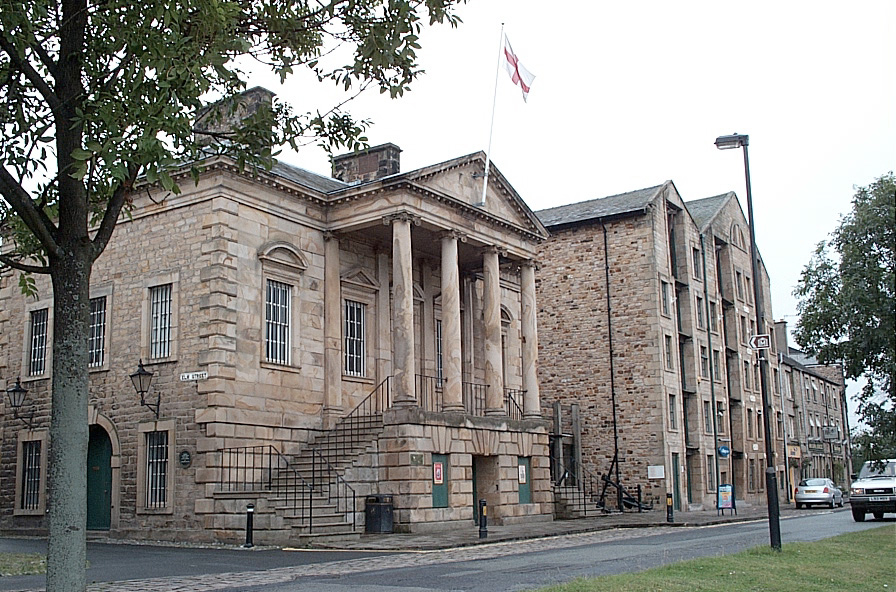
Lancaster's former Custom House (left) dates from 1764: customs dues were received upstairs in the Long Room, while the ground floor contained a weigh-house where dutiable goods were received prior to being transferred to the adjacent bonded warehouse.

In the early 16th century an official Book of Rates was published: an early form of standardized tariff assigning official valuations to various imported goods. (Prior to this, Collectors had had to rely on a sworn statement from the importer as to the likely market value of their goods).

The Pool of London was the main centre of international trade in the country; the majority of revenue was received there and its administrative systems were well established. Elsewhere in the country, though, Customs procedures were much more variable both in their details and their effectiveness. In the second half of the century William Paulet as Lord High Treasurer instituted a number of reforms in an attempt to standardize procedures. The Customs Act 1558 instituted shipping controls that formed the basis of procedures that have been followed ever since: it regulated the hours during which cargoes could be loaded and unloaded and restricted this activity to named Legal Quays; it required the Master of any vessel arriving from a foreign port to give an account of their cargo at the Custom House before unloading and required all cargoes destined for foreign ports to be reported (along with their intended destinations) before loading. Coastwise traffic between English ports was also regulated by the Act.

During the 17th century a more centralised system of customs administration was developed, culminating in the end of 'farming' and the establishment of a permanent Board of Customs in 1671. This led to new appointments being made at a national level to oversee operations: a Receiver General was appointed to receive all monies from the Collectors, a Comptroller General was appointed to check and tally all the various accounts and three Surveyors General were appointed to ensure uniformity of practice across the country.

Excise duty began to be levied in England in 1643 and a permanent Board of Excise was established forty years later. The Board of Customs and the Board of Excise remained separate and independent bodies for the next two-and-a-quarter centuries, but their purposes and activities frequently overlapped and their respective officers often worked in close co-operation (or, at times, in close rivalry).

By the 18th century the variety and complexity of Customs duties had greatly increased, as had the number of associated laws, fees, exemptions and regulations: there were over a hundred different types of duty, governed by eighteen different statutes, with different rules of application in each case. Eventually it was William Pitt the Younger who, as Prime Minister, rose to the challenge of rationalizing the revenue system. In 1780, a Commission of Inquiry reported on the proliferation of lucrative 'patent' posts associated with HM Customs; by the end of the century these sinecures were being abolished. Another committee looked into the complex matter of fees (it was not unusual for merchants to have to make payments to several different officials in order to clear a single consignment of goods); these were also abolished not long afterwards. The most ambitious change, however, was the passing of an Act of Parliament in 1787 which sought to simplify the vastly complicated profusion of Customs laws and levies which had accrued over time. The Act repealed all the existing legislation and abolished the existing varieties of duty, replacing them with one single duty for each article (this required 2,615 separate resolutions to be passed by Parliament). Furthermore, the Act abolished the various different Exchequer funds into which different duties had been paid, creating in their place a single account known as the Consolidated Fund.

=== Nineteenth century ===
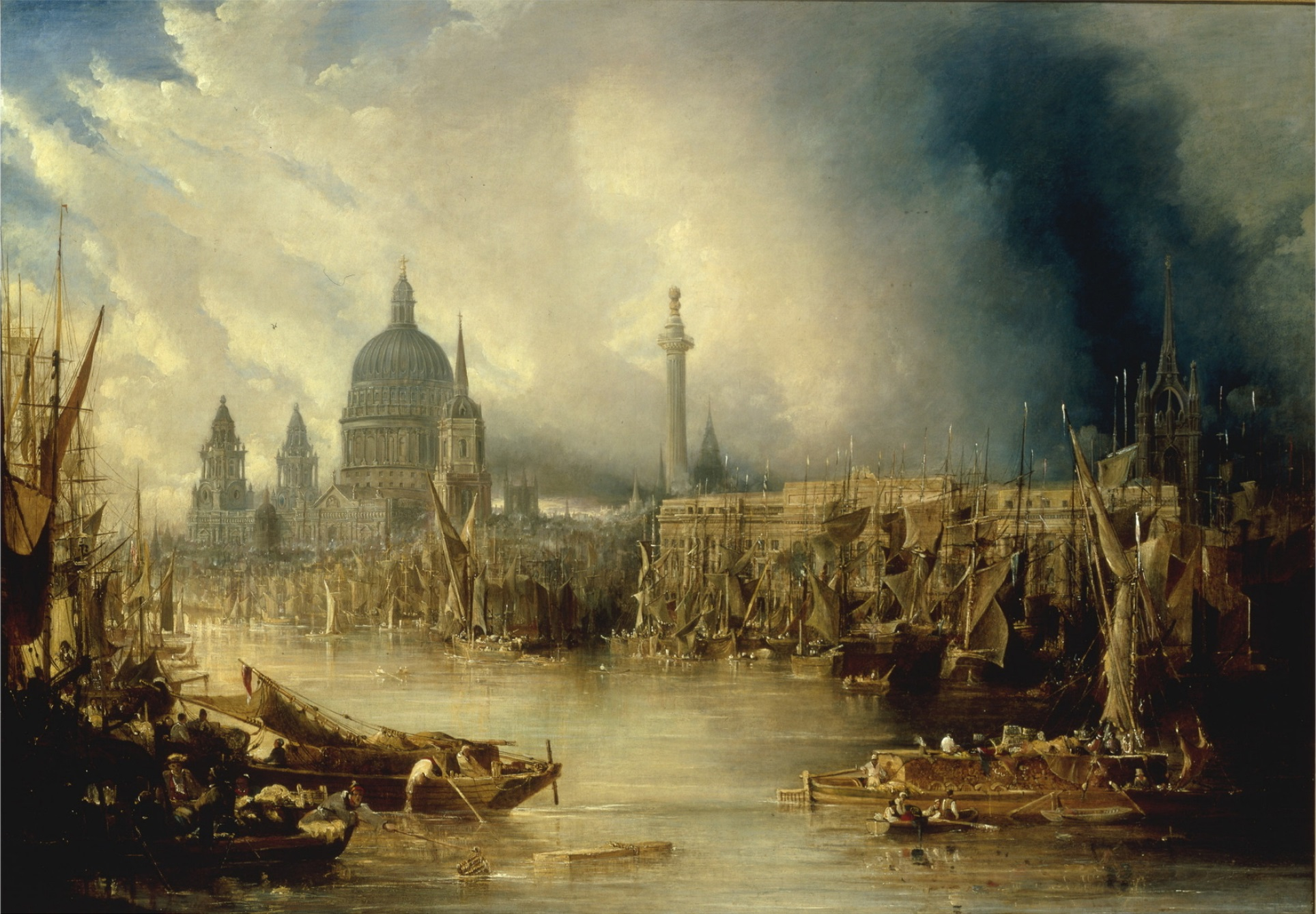
Shipping on the Thames in the early 19th century; the Custom House is on the right of the picture, almost hidden behind a profusion of masts and sails.

In 1796 a committee examining the state of trade and shipping in the Port of London concluded that the provision of legal quays was vastly inadequate and was causing frequent delays and congestion on the river. The widespread incidence of theft from unguarded wharves was also noted. As a result, the decision was taken to construct enclosed docks further downriver (following the example of those that had been developed in Liverpool). West India Docks were opened in 1802, London Docks in 1805 and East India Docks in 1806. The Customs Commissioners were closely involved in the design of these new docks, ensuring that facilities for importing were kept separate from those for exporting, insisting on the proper provision of customs facilities on site and requiring the new dock complexes to be enclosed behind high boundary walls to prevent illicit removal of cargoes. Similar commercial docks were constructed elsewhere around the country, beginning with Bristol Docks in 1809; the process of construction and expansion of docks continued throughout the century.

A significant change of scene came about for HM Customs with the liberalisation of trade that took place under Sir Robert Peel and others from the 1840s onwards. A series of Acts of Parliament (in 1842, 1845 and 1846) led to the abolition of no fewer than 1,200 tariffs (including all export duty) and those that remained were reduced to a maximum of 10%. The pattern continued under William Gladstone with a further 140 items being freed from duty, leaving just 48 on the tariff (most notably rice, tea, coffee, sugar, wine, timber and tobacco). Nevertheless, Customs revenues continued to grow because the volume of trade greatly increased.

=== Amalgamation ===
The feasibility of combining HM Customs with the Excise Department (part of the Inland Revenue since 1849) had been explored since 1862 (if not earlier). In 1866, proposals were made for a more extensive amalgamation: combining HM Customs and the General Post Office with the Inland Revenue to form a new government department headed by a Secretary of State. Neither this nor other proposals resulted in any change. In 1888 a Royal Commission was set up to explore the options; but it concluded that the negative effects of enforcing such changes would outweigh the advantage of any cost-savings.

Nevertheless, the case for amalgamation was strong due to the overlap between Customs work and Excise work, both of which required officers to be stationed in ports and both of which included the receipt of revenue on wines, spirits, tea and tobacco. Thus, in his preamble to the 1908 Finance Bill, H. H. Asquith announced his intention 'to transfer the Excise Department from the Inland Revenue to the Customs' citing 'administrative economy and efficiency' as the reason. The 'Excise Transfer Order' came into effect on 1 April 1909, creating a new Board of Customs and Excise. It took two and a half years for the effects of the amalgamation to be worked out at a local level: various jobs were combined, with the new grade of Officer of Customs and Excise encompassing both the indoor and outdoor work of the two former departments. At regional level posts were likewise amalgamated as the 57 (coast-based) Customs Collections were combined with the 60 Excise Collections to form 92 new Collections (or administrative areas).

== Border enforcement ==
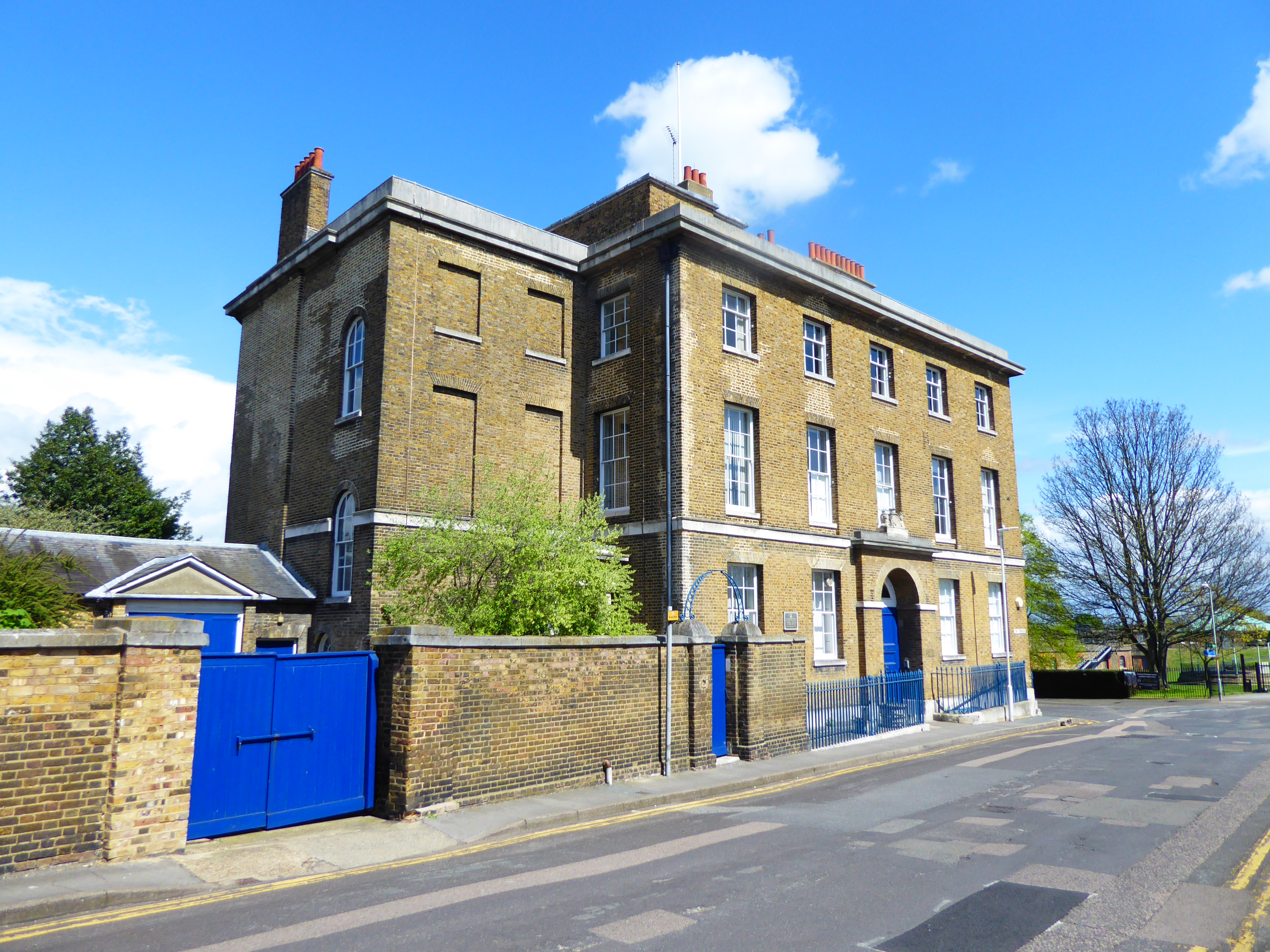
Custom House, Gravesend (built in 1815 and still in HMRC service two centuries later). By the 15th century, ships entering the Port of London were required to take a Tide Waiter on board at Gravesend. Later it served as a principal base of the Waterguard and the Cutter service.

In the late 17th century, a concerted effort was made to combat the growing problem of smuggling. Hitherto, the main preventive officers had been those involved in monitoring vessels coming in and out of the ports; (these officers were known as Waiters). Each Custom House also had use of one or more small 'preventive boats' for carrying out harbour duties and patrolling nearby creeks and coves.

This, however, left large areas of the coast unguarded; so to supplement the port officers, the Board of Customs and the Board of Excise both began to employ land-based Riding Officers and sea-going Revenue Cruisers to help patrol more effectively along the coastline. Later, in the early 19th century, the organisation of the boats and cruisers (previously under local administration) was consolidated under the oversight of a new body called the Preventive Water Guard; this in turn was amalgamated together with the Riding Officer establishment to form the Coast Guard.

Before the establishment of the Preventive Water Guard, the term 'waterguard' had been in use generically for many years to describe customs officers operating from any sort of vessel (as opposed to land-based officers). Its use was later formalised as the title of the branch of the service dedicated to preventive work. The Riding Officers, by association, were sometimes called the 'land guard'.

Since at least the 17th century, the practice of preventive officers systematically searching a vessel for illicit goods has been called 'rummaging'.

=== Land-waiters and Tide-waiters ===
Since the early days of HM Customs, the junior officers stationed in a port had been called Waiters. By the 17th century, there was a distinction between Land-waiters, who had largely taken over from the Searchers the job of supervising the unloading of imported goods and then examining them, and Tide-waiters, tasked with boarding ships 'on the tide' prior to landing, to ensure that no imported goods were unloaded prematurely. (Tide Waiters were routinely required to remain on board until all cargo had been correctly discharged). Both were involved in checking for smuggled goods; the Land-Waiters would provide the Tide-Waiters with a list of all goods due to be discharged from their ship; at the quayside, each would monitor the transit of the goods listed (identified in advance by the Tide Waiters on board); then, after unloading, a check would be made that both lists tallied and the ship would be rummaged before being cleared to depart.

The Searchers, in turn, focused on goods being loaded on to out-bound ships for export: having checked the cargo against the ship's manifest, they would ensure that both the manifest and the cargo on board tallied with the record of duties paid.

In the 18th century, officers involved in boarding vessels entering the Thames were being called the 'water guard'. Parliamentary papers list 'the Officers that constitute the Water Guard' in 1785 as 'the Tide Surveyors, the Tide Waiters, the Watermen, and the Watchmen, and the Coast Waiters at Gravesend'. They were overseen by four 'Inspectors of the River' who served in rotation at different locations: one at Gravesend, one at 'the Office' and two on 'River Duty'. The Tide Surveyors not only had oversight of the Tide Waiters, they were directed to board 'every ship from foreign parts' (along with the Tide Waiters) 'to take an Account of them'; they would then continue to make regular visits to the vessel until all cargo was discharged, the vessel was cleared and the Tide Waiters withdrawn. At each stage, the Tide Surveyor was directed to 'rummage wherever he finds Occasion'. In this and in other duties he was assisted by the Watermen, while the Watchmen were employed to guard ships at the quayside against unlawful removal of cargo. Each Tide Surveyor was provided with a pinnace with which to undertake his duties.

=== Preventive boats ===
By the late 18th century the design of the rowing boats used in preventive work was more or less standardised: they were between 20 & 24 ft in length, beam on average 6 ft, and were propelled with three pairs of oars (some were also provided with a sail). They were painted black with a red trim and with the royal arms displayed on the transom; from 1721 they were required to wear the distinguishing flag of the relevant revenue service when on duty. Each boat had a permanent crew of three boatmen, who would assist the officers on board as well as manning the oars. The boats were locally built, but an official oar-maker in London (first appointed by HM Customs in 1728) provided the oars.

=== The Riding Officers ===
The first Riding Officers were appointed in Kent in 1690. Initially eight in number, based in the notorious owling towns of Folkestone, Hythe, Lydd and Romney, their task was to patrol on horseback the stretches of open coastline between the ports. Following the passage of the Wool Act 1699, their numbers were expanded and they were stationed at regular intervals along the coast from Sheppey to Chichester. Each officer was expected to cover around a 10-mile length of coastline (with additional officers allocated to difficult areas); but they often found themselves greatly outnumbered by the smugglers.

=== The Revenue Cruisers ===
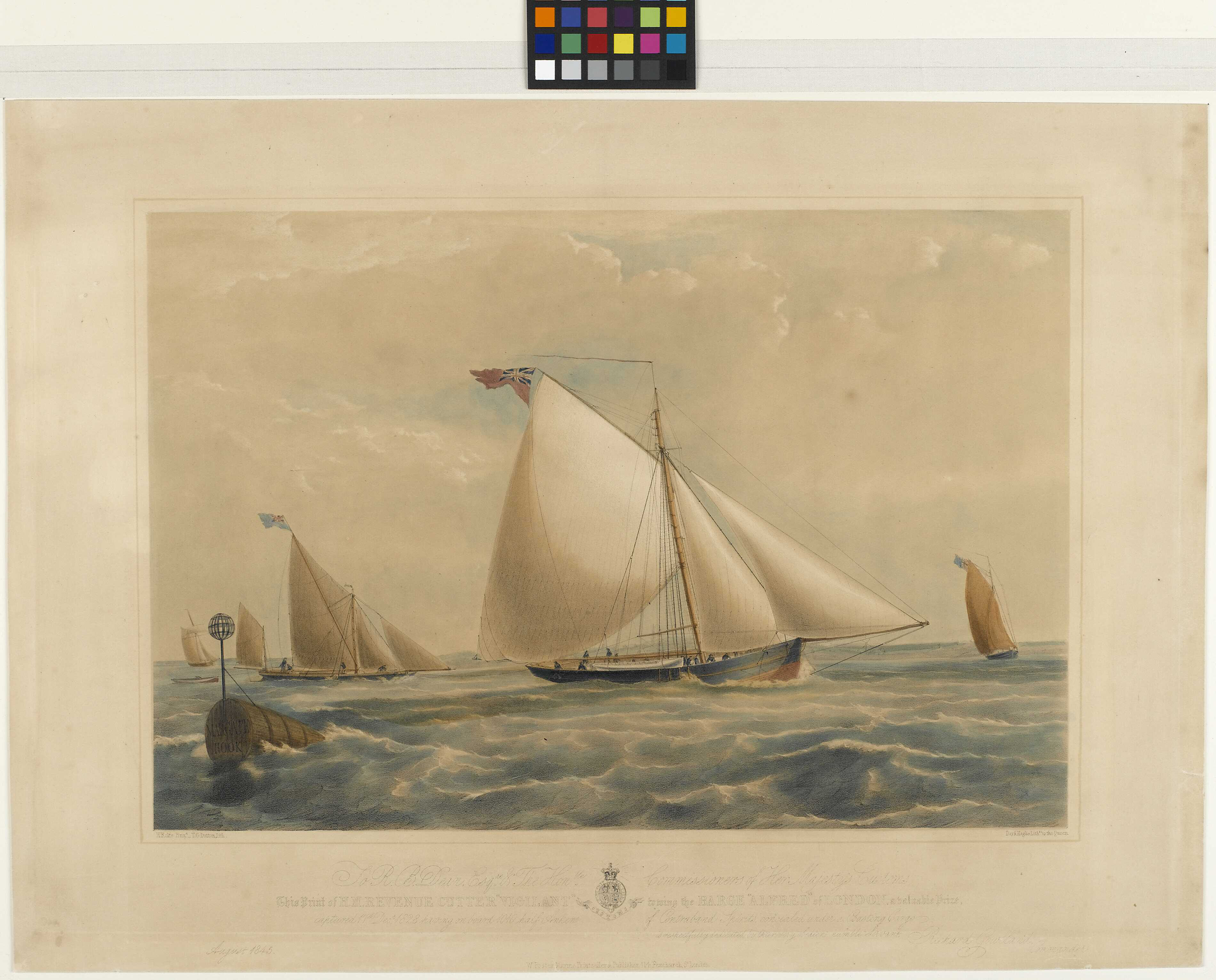
H.M. Revenue Cutter Vigilant towing the Barque Alfred of London (captured 17th Dec 1828 having contraband spirits on board).

In November 1661 a yacht (referred to as a 'smack') was acquired for use by HM Customs. Named the Industry, it seized a cargo of 'quicksilver and drugs' from a merchant ship the following year (the first recorded seizure of illicit goods by a Customs vessel). By 1666 there were four Customs smacks, operating out of Dover, Southampton and London; in 1685 there were ten, based in Gravesend, Bristol and a series of ports along the south coast. In 1690, however, all these vessels were disposed of in deference to the newly-established Riding Officers (partly in acknowledgement that these smacks, which had been acquired from various sources, were no match for the fast new vessels now employed by the smugglers). Very soon, though, it became clear that the Riding Officers could not cope alone, and seven new vessels (now termed 'sloops') were acquired, to be based at Leigh, Gravesend, Dover, Rye, Shoreham, Cowes and Poole. Later, in 1698, Charles Godolphin (one of the Commissioners of Customs) instigated a plan to combat the growth of smuggling in other parts of England by placing a further fourteen sloops in ports around the rest of the coast of England, from Newcastle to Whitehaven; thus there were 21 sloops in service by the end of the century.

By 1797 HM Customs was operating a flotilla of 33 sea-going cutters stationed all round the coast of Britain. The Excise Board also had cutters: fewer, but faster; there were seven of these in 1784, operating around the south and east coasts. Furthermore, Revenue vessels could call on the Royal Navy to assist in apprehending a non-compliant vessel; indeed, in the 18th century the Royal Navy designated a number of its own vessels to smuggling prevention duties, and HM Customs also worked closely with the Royal Navy's Fishery Protection Squadron.

Then again, the Admiralty was itself able to commandeer Revenue vessels for naval use at times of war, leaving the revenue services severely under-resourced in terms of deployable cutters during wartime (when smuggling was often rife).

=== The Preventive Water Guard ===
In 1809-10, control of the cutters and the smaller preventive boats was taken away from the local Collectors and placed under a new national administration named the Preventive Water Guard. It was arranged in three geographical divisions, covering the east coast, south coast and west coast of England and Wales, with each division overseen by an Inspecting Commander. The west coast division was provided with 10 cutters and 13 boats, the south coast division (which included Kent and London) had 23 cutters and 42 boats, while the east coast division had 9 cutters and 13 boats. Those employed in the Preventive Water Guard were remarkably well-remunerated: pay for the 'mariners' of the Water Guard was well above that of seamen in the Navy, and the Inspecting Commanders received almost as much as a Rear-Admiral.

In 1816 however, after a post-war review, the Treasury Commissioners took the decision to place the Revenue cutters under direct Admiralty control for greater efficiency (though the crew's pay and victuals were still provided by HM Customs). At the same time they sought to foster naval discipline and practices within the preventive boat service. A Captain (RN) was appointed to the new post of Controller General of the Waterguard (on a salary close to that of a full Admiral) and he reported directly to the Lords of the Treasury themselves (bypassing the Customs Commissioners); subsequently, the Water Guard provided a much-needed employment opportunity for ex-naval officers and men.

As newly-constituted, the Preventive Water Guard consisted of 140 coastal stations, each provided with an officer, a team of boatmen and a preventive boat for patrolling shallower coastal waters (while the Admiralty's Revenue cutters patrolled further out to sea). At times when the sea was too rough for the boats, officers were expected to patrol the coast on foot. Officers of the Preventive Water Guard were generally stationed away from their homes (to try to prevent collusion with local smugglers), so at various points along the shoreline 'watch houses' were built to provide them with accommodation (and to serve as a shore base). In time, operating from these watch houses, the Preventive Water Guard was also given responsibility for providing assistance in the event of shipwrecks.

HM Customs, meanwhile, was left with just two cutters of its own: Vigilant (which functioned as a Yacht for the Commissioners) and her tender Fly. With a large number of other naval vessels lying idle after the Napoleonic Wars, the Admiralty did not find much use for its newly-inherited Revenue Cutters, and most of them were soon scrapped.

=== The Coast Guard ===
By 1820 the preventive services of the United Kingdom included Riding Officers, the boats of the Preventive Water Guard, the Admiralty's Revenue cutters (plus half a dozen more cutters retained by the Customs Commissioners and the Excise Commissioners): all of which were overseen by different management structures with little co-ordination between them. It was recognised that this situation could not be allowed to persist, and in 1822 all these different branches were amalgamated, placed once more under the oversight of HM Customs and named the Coast Guard. The number of revenue vessels, which had been allowed to dwindle, was again increased: there were 33 such vessels in service in 1823 and by 1839 there were fifty. The organisation of the Riding Officers (now renamed the Mounted Guard) was also strengthened; older officers (some in their 80s) were pensioned off, and new personnel were recruited (with former service in a cavalry regiment a requirement).

As the Mounted Guard gained a more military character, so the other branches of the Coast Guard were given an increasingly naval emphasis, with naval officers now commanding the boats, as well as the Revenue cruisers, and training provided at Royal Naval establishments. In 1831, the formal decision was taken to ensure that all those serving in the Coast Guard should be made available to serve on naval vessels if and when required; and so the Coastguard (as it began to be styled after 1839) began to function more as a sort of naval reserve. This came to a head at the outbreak of the Crimean War, whereupon over 3,000 men were drafted into the Royal Navy from the Coastguard.

After the war, in 1856, the reality of this situation was recognised by the passing of the Coast Guard Service Act, which removed responsibility for the Coast Guard from HM Customs and transferred it to the Admiralty. It was primarily tasked with defence of the coastline against military attack, though revenue protection remained as a secondary duty. (Eventually, in the 20th century, the Coast Guard would be reconstituted as a life-saving organisation under the auspices of the Board of Trade.)

=== The Waterguard ===
In the early 1860s a process of reorganisation was undertaken which led to an amalgamation of the remaining preventive services, removing the distinction between those engaged in 'landing duties' and 'waterguard duties'. This followed a reduction in the amount of smuggling taking place (due in no small part to the effects of free trade). Among other changes, the old titles of 'Land-waiter' and 'Tide-waiter' disappeared, with these officers being redesignated as 'examining officers' and 'outdoor officers' respectively.

In 1891, however, a specialist Waterguard service was once more re-established within HM Customs, dedicated to rummaging vessels and combatting smuggling. The Waterguard continued to operate following the amalgamation of Customs and Excise in 1909, becoming the uniformed preventive service of HM Customs and Excise.

== See also ==
- HM Excise
- HM Customs and Excise
- HM Revenue and Customs
