= Gordon Ryder =

English architect

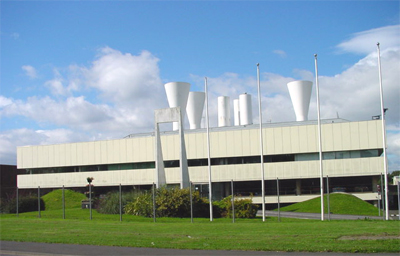
Gas Council Engineering Research Station in Killingworth, designed by Ryder & Yates

Gordon Ryder (1919–2000) OBE was an English modernist architect and co-founder with Peter Yates of Ryder and Yates, described by Historic England as "the most important post-war architectural practice in the north-east of England" for their modernist buildings in the 1960s.

Ryder studied architecture at Newcastle University School of Architecture, Planning & Landscape (then King's College, Durham) then in 1948 began working for Berthold Lubetkin on the designs for Peterlee new town. In 1953, he formed Ryder and Yates with Peter Yates, who had also worked with Lubetkin at Peterlee, one of the first multi-disciplinary practices that integrated architecture and engineering. Key projects were two buildings for Northern Gas in Killingworth; the Northern Gas Board offices built in 1963 and subsequently the Gas Council Engineering Research Station (1966-7), "a cool Corbusian building of white concrete", which won the Financial Times' industrial architecture award in 1968, and a Royal Institute of British Architects award the following year. The offices had fallen into disrepair by 2012, having been vacant for 5 years, and were set to be demolished.

The Research Station was Grade II* listed on 27 January 1997 by English Heritage (Historic England since 2015).

Other projects included social housing at North Kenton and major buildings for the Salvation Army, Tyne Tees Television and Vickers Armaments. 'Trees', a private house built in Woolsington, Newcastle upon Tyne in 1967–68, was listed Grade II in 2010. In 2015, MEA House and Ryder & Yates' own offices in Killingworth were listed Grade II, with the architects offices subsequently being removed from the register after a change of heart by the government minister in 2016.
