= Newcastle University School of Architecture, Planning and Landscape =

Architecture school in Newcastle upon Tyne, England

Coordinates: 54.979802°N 1.61516°W

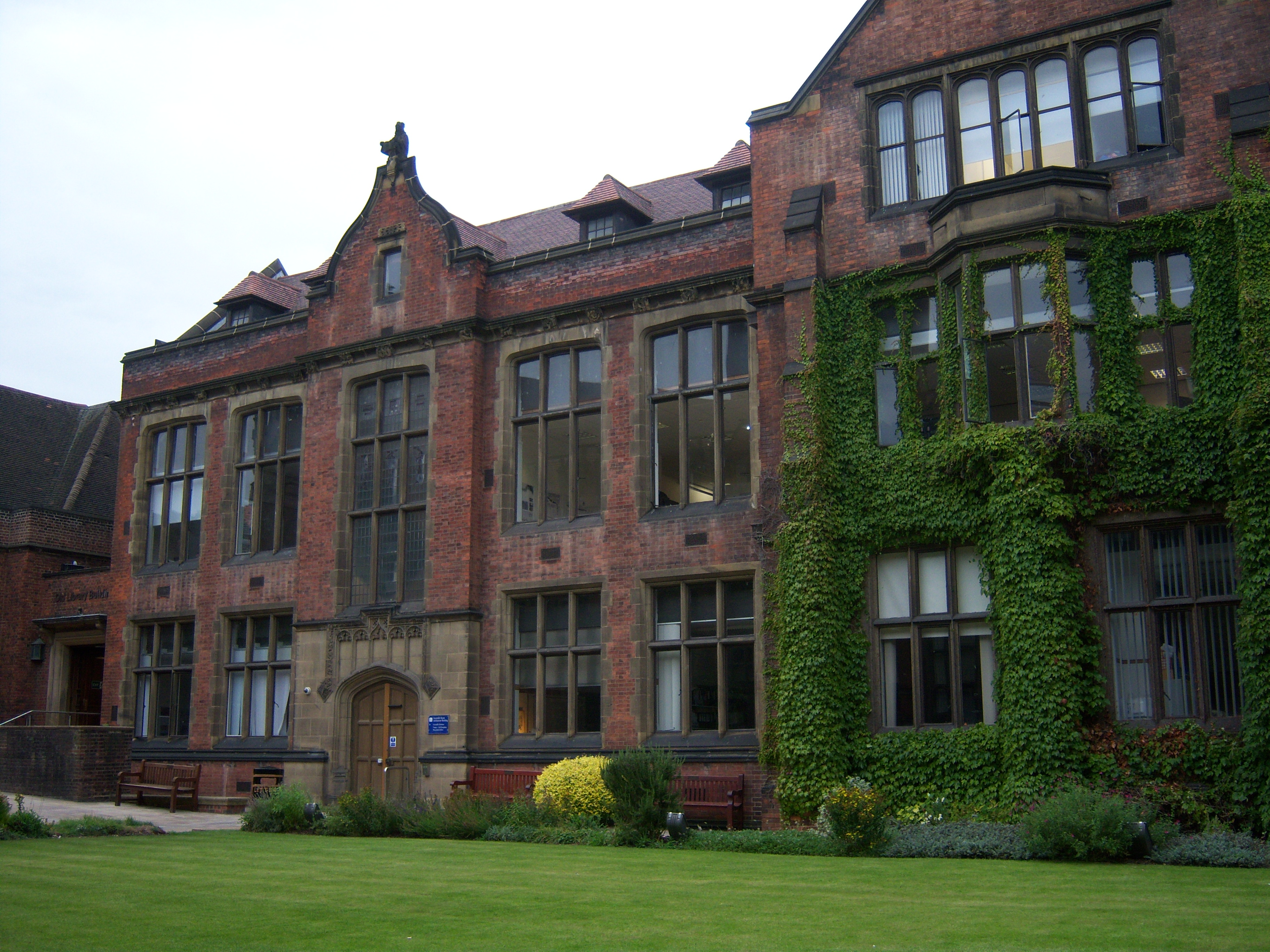
School of Architecture, Newcastle University

Newcastle University School of Architecture, Planning and Landscape is a school of architecture belonging to Newcastle University in Newcastle upon Tyne, England.

The school's operation was initially a part of a Kings College, a college belonging to Durham University, before an Act of Parliament incorporated it with Newcastle University.

== Notable staff ==
- Bruce Allsopp
- Thomas Sharp, town planner, academic in the school 1937–1945, devised the world's first degree in town planning 1943, president of the Town Planning Institute 1945.

== Notable alumni ==
- Harry Faulkner Brown, MC
- Jack Lynn
- Gordon Ryder
- Alison & Peter Smithson
- William Whitfield
- David Rock, RIBA President 1997-99.
- Alan Plater, playwright
- Terry Farrell
- Richard Murphy
- Eric Parry
- Peter Exley, AIA President 2021
- Mark Dytham, inventor of PechaKucha
- George Clarke
