= William Beckwith =

British Army general

General William Beckwith KCH
- Born: c. 1795; Trimdon, County Durham
- Died: 23 February 1871
- Burial place: Houghton-le-Spring cemetery
- Military career
- Allegiance: United Kingdom
- Branch: British Army
- Rank: General
- Conflicts: Napoleonic Wars
- Awards: KCH
- Other work: Colonel of the 14th King's Hussars

General William Beckwith, KCH (c. 1795 – 23 February 1871) was a general in the British Army.

He was the eldest son of William Beckwith of Trimdon, County Durham.

== Career ==
In 1813 he enlisted as a cornet in the 16th Light Dragoons and served with the regiment in the Peninsular War, where he was involved in the battles of Nivelle, Nive and Bayonne. In 1815 he was present at the battles of Quatre Bras and Waterloo and in December of that year was promoted lieutenant.

In 1822 he transferred to the 14th Kings Dragoons as a captain, rising to major in 1828. The regiment was posted to India in 1822 and took part in the Siege of Bharatpur. Back in England he was responsible for the quelling of reform riots in Bristol in 1831. In 1833 he was retired on half pay with the rank of lieutenant-colonel, rising to the rank of colonel in 1846, major general in 1854, lieutenant-general in 1861 and general in 1869.

He was given in 1860 the colonelcy of the 14th King's Hussars, previously the 14th Kings Dragoons, which he held until his death.

== Private life ==
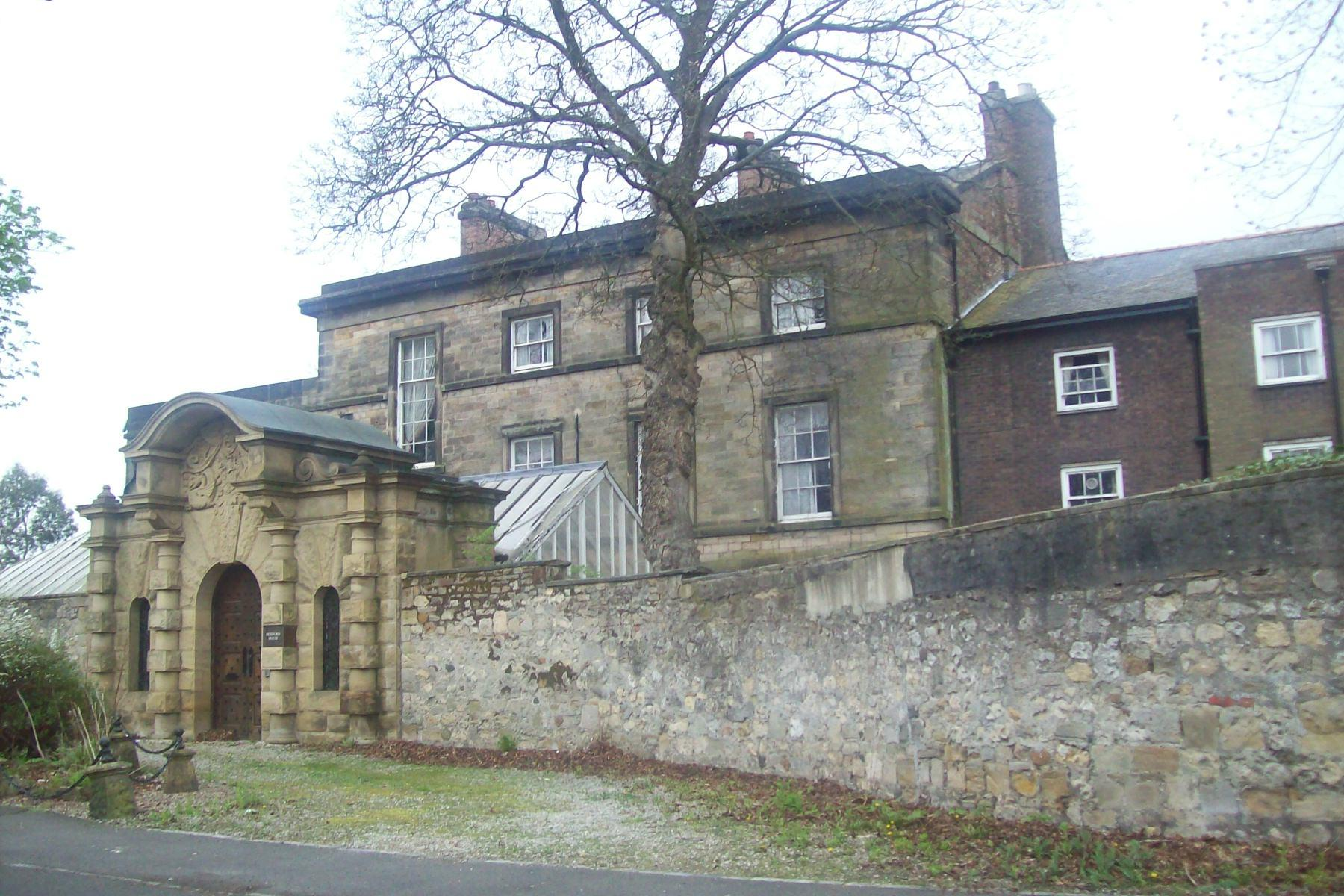
Silksworth House (now Doxford House

He married the heiress Priscilla Maria Hopper of Silksworth, County Durham in 1821, who went on to inherit Silksworth House from her father. Beckwith was appointed High Sheriff of Durham for 1857.

On his death in 1871 he was buried in Houghton Hillside Cemetery, Houghton-le-Spring.
