= David Rock (architect) =

English architect (1929–2025)

David Annison Rock (27 May 1929 – 15 November 2025) was an English architect, graphic designer, illustrator and painter, who was twice RIBA vice-president (1986–1987 and 1995–1997) and RIBA president from 1997 to 1999.

== Life and career ==
Rock was born in Sunderland on 27 May 1929. After school, he went to the Newcastle University School of Architecture, Planning and Landscape (then part of Durham University) from 1947 to 1952, leaving with a first-class honours. He studied under Lord Holford and Peter Smithson who described him as "the most naturally gifted and talented architect he'd ever met". He then worked for Basil Spence for five years.

He joined Grenfell Baines & Hargreaves in 1959 as Associate Partner to open its first London office; this office initially operated out of Rock's flat in Earls Court. Rock was responsible for expanding Building Design Partnership's (BDP) London office during the 1960s, becoming an equity partner in 1964.

He resigned from BDP in 1971 and went into partnership with another former BDP architect, John Townsend, an expert on bürolandschaft. In 1972, Rock Townsend opened Workspace, developing the idea of multidisciplinary working by providing office space for small design businesses; a former Sanderson wallpaper factory in Chiswick, west London was converted into the Barley Mow Centre, providing workspaces for craftspeople, designers and architects. In the 1980s, Rock Townsend designed the postmodern Angel Square development in Islington (partially demolished in the 2020s).

Rock was a supporter of the radical architecture group Archigram in the 1960s and 1970s. He nominated them for the RIBA Royal Gold Medal, which they received in 2002, describing the group as "a necessary irritant".

Rock left Rock Townsend in 1993, and, after two separate terms as RIBA vice-president (1986–87 and 1995–97), was RIBA president between 1997 and 1999. During his presidency, he oversaw the handover of over one million items from the RIBA archive to the V&A, and chaired the Stirling Prize panel that awarded the 1998 Building of the Year title to the Imperial War Museum Duxford in Cambridgeshire.

Chair of the Scottish Society of Architect Artists, an exhibition of Rock's paintings, including early student and postgraduate drawings through to more recent works, was held at the Eleven Spitalfields Gallery in east London in 2022.

Rock died on 15 November 2025, at the age of 96.
