= Robert Appleby Bartram (shipbuilder) =

British shipbuilder (1835–1925)

Sir Robert Appleby Bartram, JP (23 March 1835 – 8 August 1925) was a British shipbuilder.

Bartram was born in South Hylton, County Durham (now part of Sunderland), and was the son of the shipbuilder George Bartram (1800–1891) and his wife Margaret, née Appleby (1809–1870). On 28 December 1859, he married Ann Naizby (1837–1870) at St Mary's Church, South Hylton. They had four children: George (1860–1910), William Naizby (1862–1923), Margaret Appleby (1865–1906) and Robert Appleby (1867–?). After his wife's death, he married Margaret Agnes Rhind (1833–1900) in 1878 at Woodhaven, Fife. On his father's retirement in 1871, Bartram took over the family company, Bartram & Sons.

On 7 February 1889, he laid the foundation stone of St George's Presbyterian Church in Ashbrooke, Sunderland. In the late 19th century, Bartram gave £10,500 (approximately £800,000 in 2007) to Sunderland Town Council for the establishment of technical scholarships. The scholarships led to the founding of Sunderland Technical College in 1901, one of the forerunners of the University of Sunderland. On 2 June 1922, Bartram was gazetted a Knight Bachelor as "[o]ne of the Senior JP's of Sunderland. Leading educationalist from 1870. A generous benefactor to charitable, religious and educational bodies in Sunderland" and knighted at Buckingham Palace by George V on 8 July 1922.

Bartram died in Harrogate, North Riding of Yorkshire, in 1925 and was buried in Bishopwearmouth Cemetery, Sunderland, on 11 August 1925. His namesake grandson was Colonel Robert Appleby Bartram.
