= Woolsington Hall =

Listed building in Newcastle, England

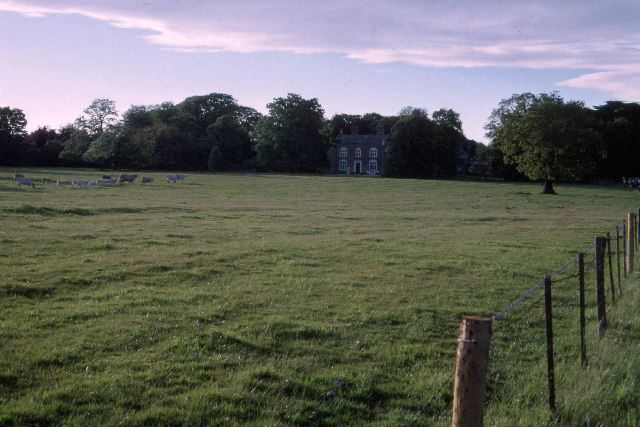
- Woolsington Hall (pre-fire)

- Location within Tyne and Wear

General information
- Location: Woolsington, Newcastle upon Tyne, England
- Coordinates: 55°1′55.41″N 1°41′20.68″W
- Year built: Third quarter 17th century
- Renovated: Late 18th and early 19th century (wings added)

Listed Building – Grade II*
- Official name: Woolsington Hall and wall attached to north west
- Designated: 27 August 1952
- Reference no.: 1123737

Woolsington Hall is a Grade II* listed country house in a 92-acre (37 ha) estate, in the village of Woolsington, in Newcastle upon Tyne, England, north-west of the city centre, and immediately south of Newcastle Airport. In addition to the hall, the stables, coach house, orangery, walled garden and east wing are Grade II listed.

The hall is not habitable and requires full restoration. It has been on Historic England's Heritage at Risk Register since 2002.

== Design ==
The hall is built of stone, with painted ashlar dressings and edged by quoins. The roof is made of slate from the Lake district with stone gables. The house is two storeys tall, divided into three bays and a single bay wing.

== History ==
Woolsington Hall was the seat of the Bell family, landowners in Dinnington. In 1828 Matthew Bell, MP for Northumberland and Deputy Lieutenant of Northumberland was listed as living at the hall. All four battalions of the 103rd (Tyneside Irish) Brigade camped briefly at Woolsington Hall in May 1915. Conditions were so bad at Woolsington Hall that many soldiers who lived locally went home rather than stay there. The brigade trained in trench fighting at nearby Ponteland, and paraded through Newcastle city centre before departing from Woolsington for Salisbury Plain.

== Recent history ==
Woolsington Hall was bought by businessman Sir John Hall's Cameron Hall Developments for £1.32 million in 1994. Since 1994, Hall has proposed several developments of the Woolsington site including a football academy for Newcastle United F.C., which was later built in Little Benton. A luxury hotel and golf course was later planned for the Woolsington Hall estate. Hall was threatened with legal action by Newcastle City Council in 2005 unless he carried out repairs to Woolsington Hall.

The hall was put up for sale for £2 million in October 2012, but was withdrawn from sale in May 2013. At that time, due to the dereliction of the hall it was described by the Daily Telegraph as a "distressed asset". In 2013 the councillor for the Woolsington ward, George Pattison, said that "It is a complete waste for it to be standing empty. It is a beautiful building and has a lot of historical significance...If it could be restored to something of the calibre of the Mansion House in Jesmond then it would be a great asset to the ward." The house was made weather tight in 2008.

Since 2002 the Woolington Hall estate has been on Historic England's Heritage at Risk Register. The register said that the hall "...is vacant and showing signs of roof failure." It was rated Category C by the register, defined as "Slow decay, no solution agreed". On the night of 30 December 2015, Woolsington Hall was gutted by a fire which destroyed its floors and roof. It was described as an arson attack by Northumbria Police who appealed for information to identify the perpetrators. The Heritage at Risk Register now categorises it as in 'category F, very bad condition'.

The Leazes Gates, a set of two-tonne monumental gates from Newcastle United's St James' Park stadium, were stored in the grounds of Woolsington Hall until their restoration in August 2013. It had been hoped that they would form the entrance to a new football training centre at the hall.

It was announced on 20th August 2026 that Newcastle United had entered into an agreement to acquire a 190 acre site including the hall to build a new training facility.

== See also ==
- Grade II* listed buildings in Tyne and Wear
