= Castles in Tyne and Wear =

Group of four castles in England

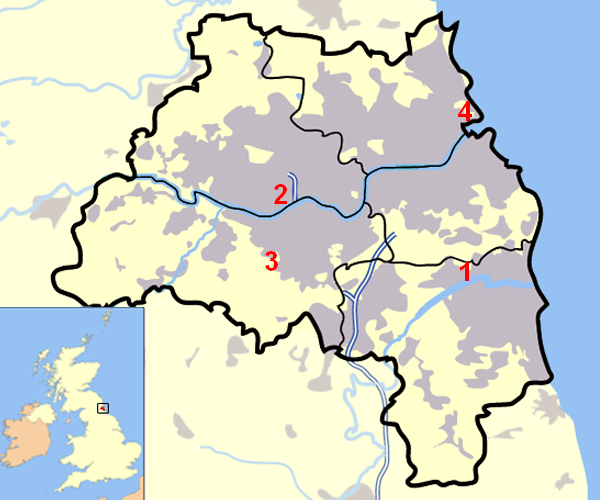
Image of Tyne and Wear with the general position of castles. 1. Hylton Castle 2. Newcastle Castle Keep 3. Ravensworth Castle 4. Tynemouth Castle

There are four castles in Tyne and Wear, a metropolitan county in North East England. One is a gatehouse, one is a keep, one is an enclosure and one is an artillery fort.

All four of Tyne and Wear's castles are scheduled monuments. A scheduled monument is a "nationally important" archaeological site or historic building, given protection against unauthorised change.

The purpose of a castle was not simply militaristic, but was also considered to be a stamp of authority over the population of an area and a status symbol. Some would have acted as centres of trade and administration for a manor. The earliest castle in Tyne and Wear is Tynemouth Castle.

== List of castles ==
Castle	Location	Type	Constructed	Scheduled	Coordinates
Hylton Castle	North Hylton, Sunderland	Gatehouse	1390s–1400s	Yes	54.9225°N 1.4432°W
Newcastle Castle Keep	Newcastle-upon-Tyne	Keep	1168–1178	Yes	54.9688°N 1.6104°W
Ravensworth Castle	Lamesley, Gateshead	Enclosure	14th century (or earlier)	Yes	54.9266°N 1.6380°W
Tynemouth Castle	North Shields, Tynemouth	Artillery fort	1095	Yes	55.0177°N 1.4197°W
