= Woolsington =

Coordinates: 55.022°N 1.689°W

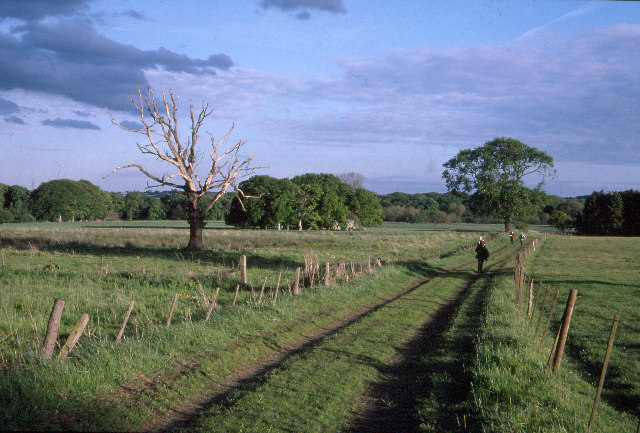
- Woolsington Park

- Location within Tyne and Wear
- Population: 11,160 (2011)
- OS grid reference: NZ199697
- Civil parish: Woolsington
- Metropolitan borough: Newcastle upon Tyne
- Metropolitan county: Tyne and Wear
- Region: North East
- Country: England
- Sovereign state: United Kingdom
- Post town: NEWCASTLE UPON TYNE
- Postcode district: NE13
- Dialling code: 0191
- Police: Northumbria
- Fire: Tyne and Wear
- Ambulance: North East
- UK Parliament: Hexham

Woolsington is a village in, and civil parish of, Newcastle upon Tyne, England. It is located north-west of the city centre, covering a large geographical area. It was also formerly an electoral ward, although the ward was slightly larger than the civil parish, extending slightly further south. The parish also includes Newbiggin Hall, Woolsington village and Newcastle Airport. It had a population of 11,160 as of the 2011 Census.

The place-name 'Woolsington' is first attested in Charter Rolls of 1204, where it appears as Wlsinton. The name means 'the town or settlement of Wulfsige's people'.

The Grade II* listed Woolsington Hall and its 92-acre estate are located in the parish. The hall is on English Heritage's Heritage at Risk Register. In December 2015 the hall was severely damaged by fire.

There are four primary schools as well as a nursery and creche. There is also a children's centre. Other community facilities include Simonside Community Centre, Newbiggin Hall library, Gala Field Youth Centre and Chevyside Learning First. Newbiggin Hall Library has computers with free internet access. Gala Field Youth Centre provides activities and support to children and young people in the area. Simonside Community Centre on Bedeburn Road offers rooms to hire for events or meetings and a fitness suite.

House prices in Woolsington average at £154,500. However, property prices within the boundaries of the village itself range from £250,000 to £1,100,000.
