= Doxford House =

Mansion in Sunderland, England

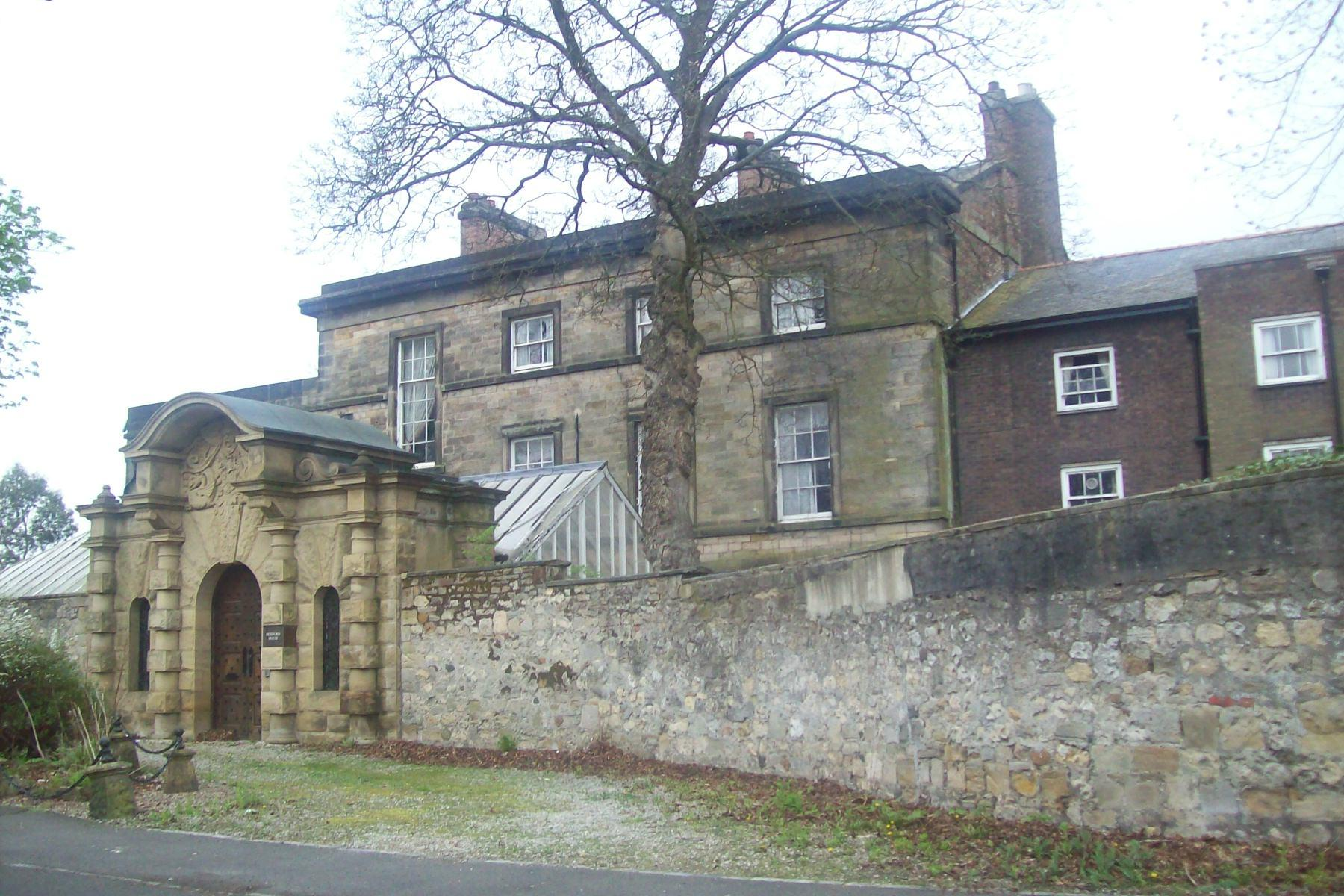
- Front of Doxford House in 2008

- Location within Tyne and Wear
- Former names: Silksworth House

General information
- Location: Silksworth, Sunderland, England
- Coordinates: 54.86844°N 1.41686°W
- Year built: 1775–80
- Renovated: c. 1900 (altered)

Listed Building – Grade II*
- Official name: Doxford House with conservatory
- Designated: 25 February 1949
- Reference no.: 1279879

Doxford House is an 18th-century mansion in the Silksworth area of Sunderland, Tyne and Wear, England. It is a Grade II* listed building.

Formerly known as Silksworth House, it was constructed in 1775–80 by William Johnson, (Note: Historic England states the building is probably c. 1820.) who on his death in 1792 bequeathed the property to his friend Hendry Hopper. In 1831 Priscilla Hopper, then heiress to the estate, married William Beckwith of Thurcroft. He was High Sheriff of Durham in 1857. The Beckwiths moved to Shropshire in about 1890 and the house was let out.

In 1902 Charles David Doxford of William Doxford & Sons, brother of Theodore Doxford, took out a 99-year lease on the 24-acre (97,000 m^{2}) estate. On his death in 1935, his daughter, Aline, bought out the lease. On her death in 1968, she bequeathed the house and estate to Sunderland Corporation who gave the house its present name and turned the gardens into Doxford Park.

In 1989 the house became a students' hall of residence for Sunderland University and from about 2000 to 2006 was occupied by the Lazarus Foundation, a drug rehabilitation charity. It was later converted into a private home.

== See also ==
- Grade II* listed buildings in Tyne and Wear
