= Gas Council Engineering Research Station =

Listed building in Tyneside, England

- ERS
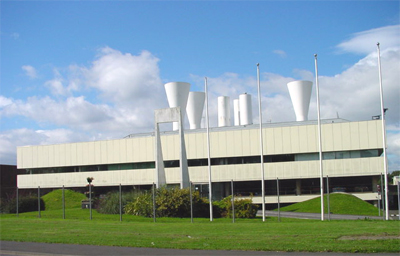

- Location within Tyne and Wear
- Former names: Gas and Engineering Research Station
- Alternative names: British Gas Engineering Research Station

General information
- Type: Engineering Research Centre
- Location: Killingworth, Tyne & Wear, NE12 0SB
- Coordinates: 55.036°N 1.58°W
- Elevation: 60 m (197 ft)
- Current tenants: North Tyneside Planning Dept
- Construction started: 1966
- Completed: 1968
- Inaugurated: 13 December 1968
- Cost: £900,000
- Client: Gas Council
- Owner: British Gas, Northern Gas Board

Technical details
- Structural system: Pre-cast reinforced concrete
- Floor count: 3
- Floor area: 50,000 square feet (4,600 m^{2})

Design and construction
- Architect: Peter Yates
- Architecture firm: Ryder & Yates & Partners
- Main contractor: Brims & Co

Listed Building – Grade II*
- Official name: British Gas Research Station including attached restaurant block to south
- Designated: 27 January 1997
- Reference no.: 1259313

The Gas Council Engineering Research Station (ERS) was a former engineering research institute on Tyneside in England, situated in a distinctively-shaped and Grade II* listed building, now occupied by the Metropolitan Borough of North Tyneside.

== History ==
The nearby £750,000 glass-fronted Norgas House had been officially opened in Killingworth on 16 July 1965 by the wife of Sir Henry Jones, the chairman of the Gas Council. It was the headquarters of the Northern Gas Board. The computer could churn out two gas bills per second. There were 705,000 customers, 6,200 employees, and a turnover of £2.7 million.

Sir Henry Jones combined the twelve gas boards into British Gas in 1973. The Northern Gas Training Centre was also in Killingworth.

The Gas Council also built a main national control centre on Coventry Road in Hinckley, Leicestershire in 1972. Construction of the £650,000 natural gas control centre had begun in January 1969, being announced in 1968. It was operated with microwave radio, with a 275-foot (84 m) radio mast built at the Hinckley site.

The north of England would take seven years to be adapted to North Sea gas, starting with Cumberland in 1969. It would cost £1.3 billion to convert the UK to North Sea gas.

=== Design ===
The building was designed by Ryder & Yates in 1965, who also designed the Television Centre, Newcastle upon Tyne. Ryder and Yates had formed in 1953 in Newcastle.

It was first announced in November 1965. It was built in anticipation of North Sea gas. Killingworth was a north-east new town, known as Killingworth Township. It was planned to open in the summer of 1968. It was built on the site of Killingworth Colliery. The modernist architecture is developed from Le Corbusier and Berthold Lubetkin.

=== Construction ===
It was built from 1966–67 on a 10-acre (4.0 ha) site. It was built under the former Northumberland County Council by Brims & Co. Construction, who started in August 1966, and cost £900,000.

On 13 December 1968, it was to be officially opened by Roy Mason, the Minister of Power, who would arrive by helicopter. Mr Mason could not attend, so his place was taken by Reg Freeson, a junior minister.

Afterwards Mr Freeson was taken by helicopter along the route of the new gas pipeline to Yorkshire. When natural gas was first imported, an initial natural gas pipeline was built by 1963, terminating at West Yorkshire. This was extended to Newcastle by March 1969, by William Press Group of Darlington.

An extension was added to the building from 1975–76 to contain a restaurant. The School of Engineering opened in 1977.

It was designated a Grade II* listed building on 27 January 1997 by English Heritage (Historic England since 2015).

== Structure ==
It is situated directly between the B1505 to the east and the East Coast Main Line (ECML) to the west, in the west of Killingworth. Nearby to the south was the former distinctively-designed headquarters, Norgas House, of the Northern Gas Board, also designed by Ryder & Yates, until North Tyneside agreed its demolition in 2012.

Block A housed the Engineering Research Station and Block B housed the School of Engineering.

== Function ==
It housed the main engineering research function of British Gas, where the National Transmission System (NTS) was designed, although British Gas also operated a Midlands Research Station (MRS) and a London Research Station (LRS). The research centre's first function was to design the pipeline system around the UK. It researched metallurgy and pipeline technology, including avoiding any cracks in the UK's pipelines.

=== Research ===
It spent £1 million a year on research, for the conversion to North Sea gas. It exchanged information with gas research institutes around the world.

In 1968 it developed pipeline technology known as a 'Super Mole', to eliminate the cut-and-cover method. The leader of the project was the assistant director Gerald Clerehugh, of Wheelwright Grammar School, in Dewsbury, a maths graduate of Durham University. He later led the online inspection unit from 1978, and was the director of research for British Gas in the 1980s, awarded the OBE in the 1989 New Year Honours.

Another means of building underground pipelines was developed by Newcastle University engineering lecturer Daniel Hettiaratchi.

== Closure ==
Loughborough was chosen for a new £50 million British Gas research centre in October 1989, to be built by the summer of 1993. The 12-acre (4.9 ha) Science and Business Park would be built as a joint venture between British Gas and Loughborough University. Loughborough was chosen, as it was central. The Loughborough site would employ 800 British Gas staff. The two London research sites and the Midland Research Station would close. It was built by Costain, and was officially opened by Michael Heseltine in July 1994.

In October 1994, it was announced that the site would close by the end of 1995. Pipeline Integrity International in Cramlington would remain.

British Gas left the site in 1995 when it brought its research stations onto a single site at Loughborough. The leader of North Tyneside Council at the time, Brian Flood, was also a senior manager at the Research Station, and he facilitated the sale of the site to the Council.

In April 1997, North Tyneside bought the 20-acre (8.1 ha) site for £2.1 million.

However in 2008, North Tyneside moved most of its functions to Cobalt Park close to the A19.

== Directors ==
- 1966, Jan van der Post (1928–1984), the son of Sir Laurens van der Post, who had worked at the London Research Centre from 1964, at Watson House in Fulham. His daughter married in September 1998, and his wife died aged 84 in April 2019
- 1978, Les Mercer, had been assistant director from 1970
- Late 1980s, Ernest Shannon CBE (1937–2011), later the President from 1996–97 of the IMechE, awarded the CBE in the 2001 Birthday Honours

== Visits ==
- 23 May 1980, in the afternoon, Margaret Thatcher and husband, with Denis Rooke, there were 400 staff. Later she visited the On Line Inspection Centre in Cramlington, built in 1979, which had moved from Killingworth, at a cost of £2.5m
- 29 June 1988, British Gas Northern arranged a conference about technology in schools, attended by John Banham, Director General of the CBI
- 10 April 1991, the Duke of Kent visited, where he met Colin Braithwaite, a project leader on pipeline inspection technology, and visited the Nissan factory in the afternoon

== See also ==
- Dunelm House, another brutalist concrete building in the North East built around the same time
- Grade II* listed buildings in Tyne and Wear
- Sunbury Research Centre, equivalent BP institution
