= Customs House, Newcastle upon Tyne =

Listed building in Newcastle upon Tyne, England

Customs House
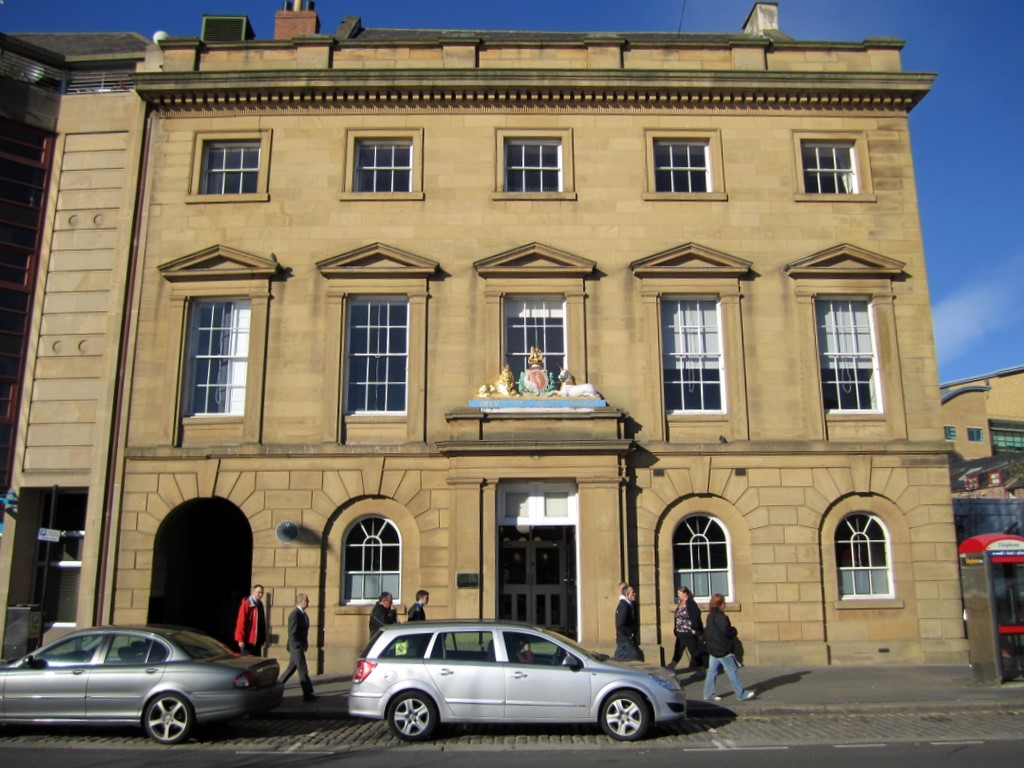

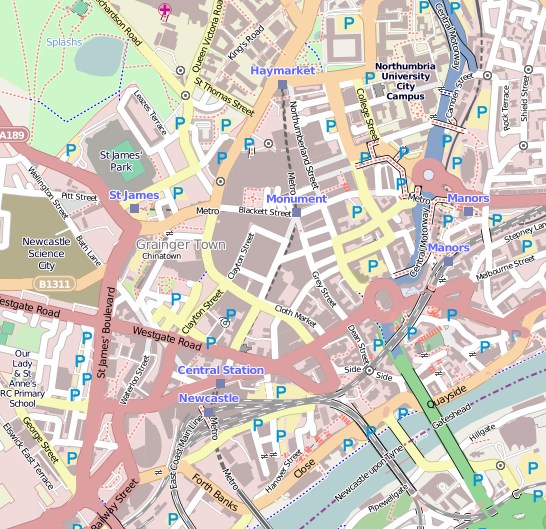
- Location within Newcastle-upon-Tyne

General information
- Location: Quayside, Newcastle upon Tyne, England
- Coordinates: 54.96921°N 1.60470°W
- Year built: 1766
- Renovated: 1833 (refronted)

Renovating team
- Architect: Sydney Smirke (1833)

Listed Building – Grade II*
- Official name: Customs House
- Designated: 17 December 1971
- Reference no.: 1325530

The Customs House is a Grade II* listed building on the Quayside in Newcastle upon Tyne, England.

== History ==
The building was built in 1766 and then altered and re-fronted by Sydney Smirke in 1833. It replaced an earlier facility for the collection of customs duties at the west end of Quayside. The royal coat of arms above the front door dates to the late Georgian era. The building is now occupied by barristers' offices.

== See also ==
- Grade II* listed buildings in Tyne and Wear
