= Peter Yates (architect) =

British architect and artist (1920–1982)

Peter Yates (19 July 1920 – 16 November 1982) was a British born artist and architect. He was best known for his partnership with Gordon Ryder in the North of England architectural firm, Ryder and Yates.

== Biography ==
=== Early life and education ===
Peter Yates was born in Leytonstone, East London in 1920. He was attracted to the visual arts at an early age, winning a painting competition as a 5 year-old in Chicks' Own (1925). Whilst at Wanstead School from September 1934 to July 1936, he painted the mural, Events at Sea.

He worked as a furniture and model maker during 1937 before attending the London Polytechnic School of Architecture, studying under Sir Hubert Bennett, Peter Moro and Robin Day from January 1938 to April 1941.

=== Career ===
==== War years ====
Yates served as a fireman on the St Paul's Watch in early 1941. It was during the London Blitz, that he painted the Wren’s churches. He met the antiquary and architectural historian, Gerald Cobb, while drawing in Ludgate Circus and they became lifelong friends. He joined the Royal Air Force in July 1941 and was stationed in Wales and Ireland before going to Versailles in 1944 with the Supreme Headquarters Allied Expeditionary Forces.

He lived in Paris following the war, where he met many artists and writers, including Georges Braque, Édouard Pignon, Jaime Sabartes, Juliette Gréco, Leon Gischia, Gertrude Stein, Alice Toklas, Andre L'Hote, Sylvia Beach and Le Corbusier.

==== Early practice ====
Yates was invited, with Clive Entwistle, to work on plans for a new United Nations building in New York by Le Corbusier. He worked on the Pyramid Project for the New Crystal Palace with Entwhistle at Ove Arup's office in Soho during 1947.

He completed a masterplan for Peterlee new town with Berthold Lubetkin in 1948, where he first met his subsequent business partner, Gordon Ryder.

Yates returned to Paris in 1950 as a Chief Designer of Unité d’Informations Visuelles, a commercial art studio located in the Old Alhambra night club in the gardens of the Champs Élysées. From there, he contributed to exhibitions across Europe, including Europa Zug and Atoms for Peace. In Paris, he collaborated with Pierre Boucher (photographer) from whom Ryder and Yates later commissioned murals for Norgas House, Killingworth.

==== Ryder and Yates ====
In 1953, after a chance meeting in London, Yates moved to Newcastle upon Tyne to form an architectural practice with Gordon Ryder. Initial work included exhibition design, which progressed onto a series of private domestic architectural commissions. A new multidisciplinary approach which included engineers fueled their progress. Their buildings were highly regarded by the public and opened opportunities of large scale commissions of industrial complexes for British Gas, Sterling Organics and others. The company designed buildings for social projects in Newcastle and Sunderland for the Salvation Army, a large social housing project in Kenton, as well as various local government and healthcare projects.

Ryder and Yates' extensive portfolio of acclaimed buildings won numerous architectural awards over the following three decades from their inception in 1953. John Allan, director of Avanti Architects, said that 'Ryder and Yates were Lubetkin's sole professional heirs – a legacy mutually recognised. Their work is a compelling reminder of Lubetkin's lesson that the poetic and the rational were inextricable impulses in modern architecture's original vision.'

A book about their partnership was published as part of the RIBA 20th Century Architects series.

=== Personal life and death ===
In 1958, Yates married musician Helen Maud Southgate, from New Zealand, with whom he had five children. Helen died in 1972. He married his second wife, Gillian Jessica Eden, in 1976. She died in 2015.

Yates died in 1982.

== Influences ==
Peter's main influences were Le Corbusier and Berthold Lubetkin. In 1976, he curated an exhibition of Le Corbusier Lithographs at the Ferens Art Gallery, Hull. He nominated and successfully campaigned for Lubetkin to be awarded the Royal Gold Medal for Architecture in 1982.

Other influences were though his friendships with Austin Wright, Kenneth Rowntree and Diana Rowntree, Dennis Flanders and others.

== Ryder and Yates buildings ==
Notable Ryder and Yates buildings include:

- R H Patterson, a Ford dealer, Newcastle upon Tyne, 1964
- North Kenton Housing Scheme (subsequently known as the Kenton Bar Estate), Newcastle upon Tyne, 1964
- Norgas House, Killingworth, 1965
- Engineering Gas Research Station (ERS), 1967
- The Citadel, Killingworth, 1967
- Sterling Organics, Dudley, 1972
- Northern Gas Computer Centre, Killingworth, 1974
- Salvation Army 'Men's Palace', Newcastle upon Tyne, 1974
- MEA House, Newcastle upon Tyne, 1976
- The On-line Inspection Centre (OLI), Cramlington, 1979
- Studio 5, Tyne Tees Television, Newcastle upon Tyne, 1981
- Swan Lodge, for the Salvation Army, Sunderland, 1982
- Vickers, Newcastle and Leeds, 1982

== Murals ==
Like Le Corbusier before him, Yates hand painted murals in many buildings. Printed murals also appeared in several commercial interiors.

=== Public ===
- Bevin Court, London
- Lake with Dragonflies, Lloyds Bank, The Citadel, Killingworth
- Northern Rock Building Society, Newcastle upon Tyne
- Martin's Bank (now Lloyds Bank) interior, Priestpopple, Hexham
- Lettering in grey, white and black, R.H. Patterson, Ford Main Dealer
- Nonsuch Palace, Linden Hall, Northumberland
- Miner's Cafeteria, Peterlee
- Time, The Golden Egg Restaurant, Newcastle upon Tyne
- The Italian Mural, Castle Eden
- Shadows on the Wall, Tyneside Cinema, Newcastle upon Tyne
- Carbon Molecular Structures, Sterling Organics Reception, Dudley
- Origins of Gas, Gas Rig, Norgas House (Pierre Boucher)
- Processions of Shells, Beacon House Lobby, Whitley Bay
- Flags, Tynemouth Sailing Club, Tynemouth.

=== Domestic ===
- Grand Parade, Tynemouth
- Trees, Woolsington
- Scotby, Cumbria.

== Exhibitions ==
=== One man exhibitions ===
- Ultramarinos, Colbert Gallery, Durham (1975)
- England! Colbert Gallery, London (1976)
- England 2, Downstairs Gallery, Newcastle upon Tyne (1978)
- Central Sea Paintings of the Mediterranean, Downstairs Gallery, Newcastle upon Tyne (1979)
- Paris! Pen Gallery, Blackheath, London (1982)
- The Lakes Bridge House Gallery, Coniston (1982)
- Cyclops Rock, Paintings of England, France, Spain, Italy and Greece Hatton Gallery, Newcastle upon Tyne (1982)
- Peter Yates Retrospective, Durham Light Infantry, Durham (1983)
- England, France and Cyclops Rock, RIBA, London (1985)
- Peter Yates British Landscapes, Margaret Howell, London (2010)
- Peter Yates Paintings 1939-1982, Hatton Gallery, Newcastle upon Tyne (2015)

=== Group exhibitions ===
- Whitechapel Art Gallery (1942, 1943)
- The Essex Art Club (1944, 45, 46, 47, 48, 49)
- Royal Academy (1943)
- Royal Society of Painters in Water Colours / Royal Watercolour Society (1943, 1944, 1946, 1982)
- Shipley Art Gallery, Gateshead
- Royal Institute of British Architects (1946)
- Durham Images. Colbert Gallery, Durham
- Wallsend Arts Centre
- Hatton Gallery, Newcastle upon Tyne
- RIBA NE Reinvigorating the Region (2010)

His works are also held in private collections in Great Britain, Europe, USA and New Zealand.
