= Stockton Road United Reformed Church =

St George's Church
- St George's with Trinity and St James
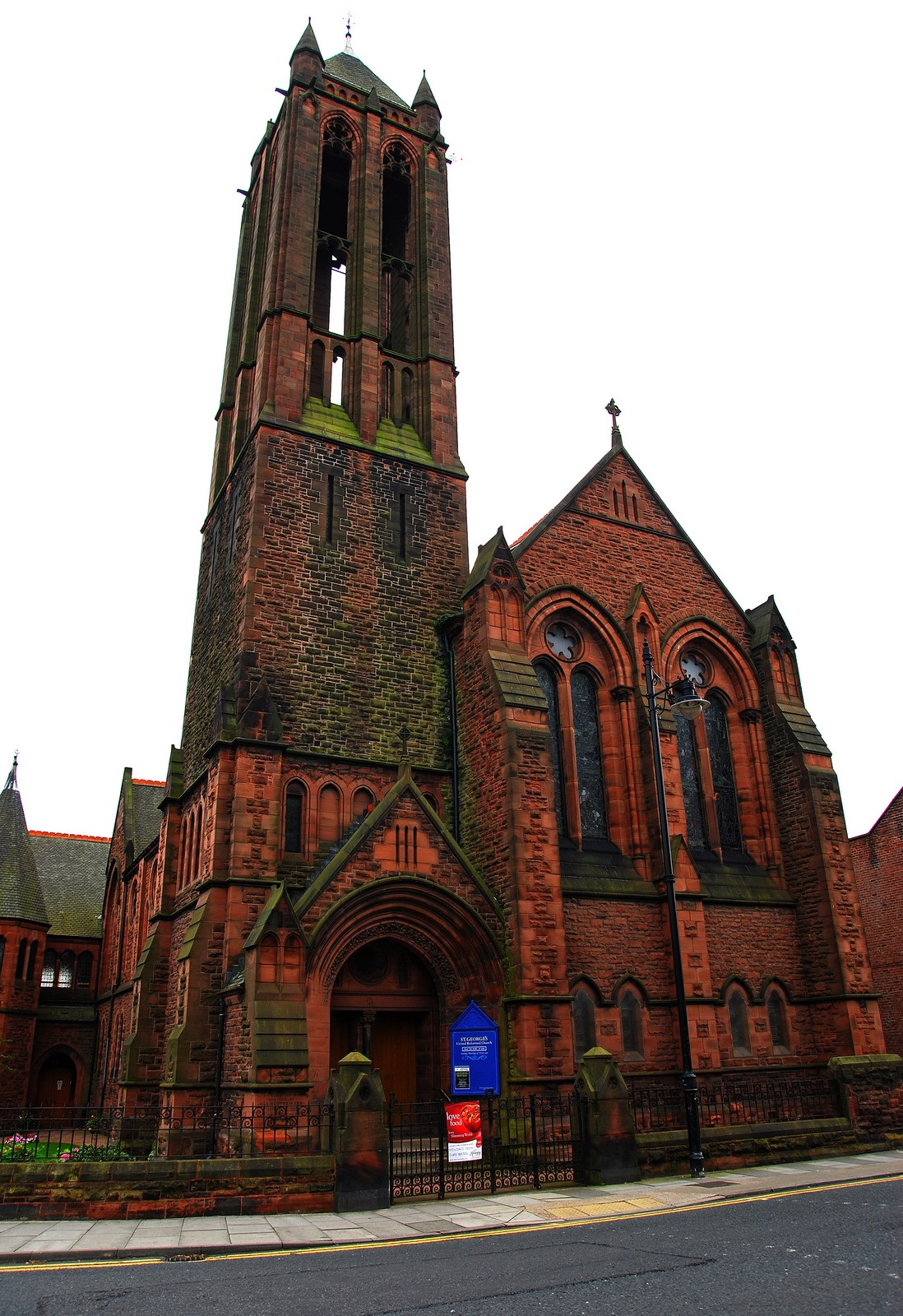

- St George's Church shown within Tyne and Wear
- 54.900°N 1.385°W
- OS grid reference: NZ395562
- Location: Sunderland, Tyne and Wear
- Country: England
- Denomination: United Reformed Church

History
- Status: Parish church

Architecture
- Functional status: Active
- Architect: John Bennie Wilson

Administration
- Diocese: Durham

Stockton Road United Reformed Church (formerly St George's with Trinity and St James Church (abbreviated to St George's)) is a United Reformed church in the Ashbrooke area of Sunderland, Tyne and Wear, England.

Originally a Presbyterian church, it was constructed by John Bennie Wilson of Glasgow in 1888–90, to replace a former chapel on Villiers Street which was too small for the congregation. Much of the funding was provided by a local shipowner, (later Sir) Robert Appleby Bartram, who laid the foundation stone on 7 February 1889. The church was constructed of red sandstone from Dumfries and modelled upon Crescent Church, Belfast.

In 2007 the congregation merged with the former West Park United Reformed Church, and from 2014 chose to use the St. George's building and sell the West Park building.
