= List of schools in Newcastle upon Tyne =

This is a list of schools in Newcastle upon Tyne in Tyne and Wear, England.

== State-funded schools ==
=== Primary and first schools ===
- Archbishop Runcie CE First School
- Archibald First School
- Atkinson Road Primary Academy
- Beech Hill Primary School
- Benton Park Primary School
- Bridgewater Primary School
- Broadway East First School
- Broadwood Primary School
- Brunton First School
- Byker Primary School
- Canning Street Primary School
- Central Walker CE Primary School
- Cheviot Primary School
- Chillingham Road Primary School
- Christ Church CE Primary School
- Cragside Primary School
- Dinnington First School
- English Martyrs RC Primary School
- Excelsior Academy
- Farne Primary School
- Grange First School
- Hawthorn Primary School
- Hilton Primary Academy
- Hotspur Primary School
- Kenton Bar Primary School
- Kingston Park Primary School
- Knop Law Primary School
- Lemington Riversde Primary School
- Milecastle Primary School
- Moorside Primary School
- Mountfield Primary School
- Newburn Manor Primary School
- North Fawdon Primary School
- Our Lady and St Anne's RC Primary School
- Ravenswood Primary School
- Regent Farm First School
- Sacred Heart RC Primary School
- St Alban's RC Primary School
- St Bede's RC Primary School
- St Catherine's RC Primary School
- St Charles' RC Primary School
- St Cuthbert's RC Primary School, Kenton)
- St Cuthbert's RC Primary School, Walbottle
- St George's RC Primary School
- St John Vianney RC Primary School
- St John's Primary School
- St Joseph's RC Primary School
- St Lawrence's RC Primary School
- St Mark's RC Primary School
- St Michael's RC Primary School
- St Oswald's RC Primary School
- St Paul's CE Primary School
- St Teresa's RC primary school
- St Vincent's RC Primary School
- Simonside Primary School
- South Gosforth First School
- Stocksfield Avenue Primary School
- Thomas Walling Primary Academy
- Throckley Primary School
- Tyneview Primary School
- Walbottle Village Primary School
- Walkergate Community School
- Waverley Primary School
- Welbeck Academy
- West Denton Primary School
- West Jesmond Primary School
- West Newcastle Academy
- West Walker Primary School
- Westerhope Primary School
- Westgate Hill Primary Academy
- Wingrove Primary School
- Wyndham Primary School

=== Middle schools ===
- Gosforth Central Middle School
- Gosforth East Middle School
- Gosforth Junior High Academy

=== Secondary and upper schools ===
- Benfield School
- Callerton Academy
- Excelsior Academy
- Gosforth Academy
- Great Park Academy
- Jesmond Park Academy
- Kenton School
- North East Futures UTC
- Sacred Heart RC High School
- St Cuthbert's RC High School
- St Mary's RC School
- Studio West
- Walbottle Academy
- Walker Riverside Academy

=== Special and alternative schools ===
- Hadrian School
- Mary Astell Academy
- Newcastle Bridges School
- Sir Charles Parsons School
- Thomas Bewick School
- Trinity Academy Newcastle

=== Further education ===
- Newcastle College
- Newcastle Sixth Form College

== Independent schools ==
=== Primary and preparatory schools ===
- Newcastle Preparatory School

=== Senior and all-through schools ===
- Bahr Academy
- Dame Allan's School
- Newcastle High School for Girls
- Newcastle School for Boys
- Royal Grammar School
- Westfield School

=== Special and alternative schools ===
- Northern Counties School
- Talbot House School
