= Gosforth School =

Gosforth School may refer to various schools in Gosforth, Newcastle upon Tyne, England:

- Gosforth Academy, formerly Gosforth High School
- Gosforth Junior High Academy, formerly Gosforth West Middle School
- Gosforth East Middle School

For a list of Schools in Gosforth see Education in Gosforth
