= Gosforth West =

Gosforth West may refer to:

- West Gosforth, an electoral ward, Newcastle upon Tyne, England
- Gosforth West Middle School, the former name of Gosforth Junior High School in Gosforth, Newcastle upon Tyne, England
