= Cragside (disambiguation) =

Cragside may refer to:

== Places ==
- Cragside, Rothbury, Northumberland, England, UK; a Victorian Era country house
- Cragside, Cold Spring, New York State, USA; a Reconstruction Era estate home
- Cragside Station, Amberley Museum Railway, Amberley, West Sussex, Sussex, England, UK; a train station
- Cragside Primary School, Newcastle upon Tyne, Tyne and Wear, England, UK; see List of schools in Newcastle upon Tyne

== Ships ==
- MV Cragside, a RO-RO ship that was launched in 2010
- Cragside, a British ship that was launched in 1887
- SS Cragside, a British cargo steamer that sank in 1923
- SS Cragside, a British coastal steamer that sunk in 1935

== Arts, entertainment, media ==
- "Cragside", an 1887 musical composition by Emma Marcy Raymond
- Cragside, a 2017 mystery novel in the DCI Ryan series, by LJ Ross

== Other uses ==
- Baron Armstrong of Cragside, the Baron of Cragside, a title held by the Armstrong baronial family
- Cragside, an Australian racehorse, winner of the 1948 Festival Stakes (ATC)

== See also ==
- Kragsyde, Manchester-by-the-Sea, Massachusetts, USA; a Shingle-style mansion
- Crag (disambiguation)
- Side (disambiguation)
