= Gosforth Middle Schools =

Middle schools in Newcastle upon Tyne, England

The Gosforth area of Newcastle upon Tyne, Tyne and Wear, England, has three main Middle Schools. They are Central, East and Junior High (formerly West). Students from all three middle schools usually transfer to Gosforth Academy.

== Gosforth Central Middle School ==
Gosforth Central Middle School badge

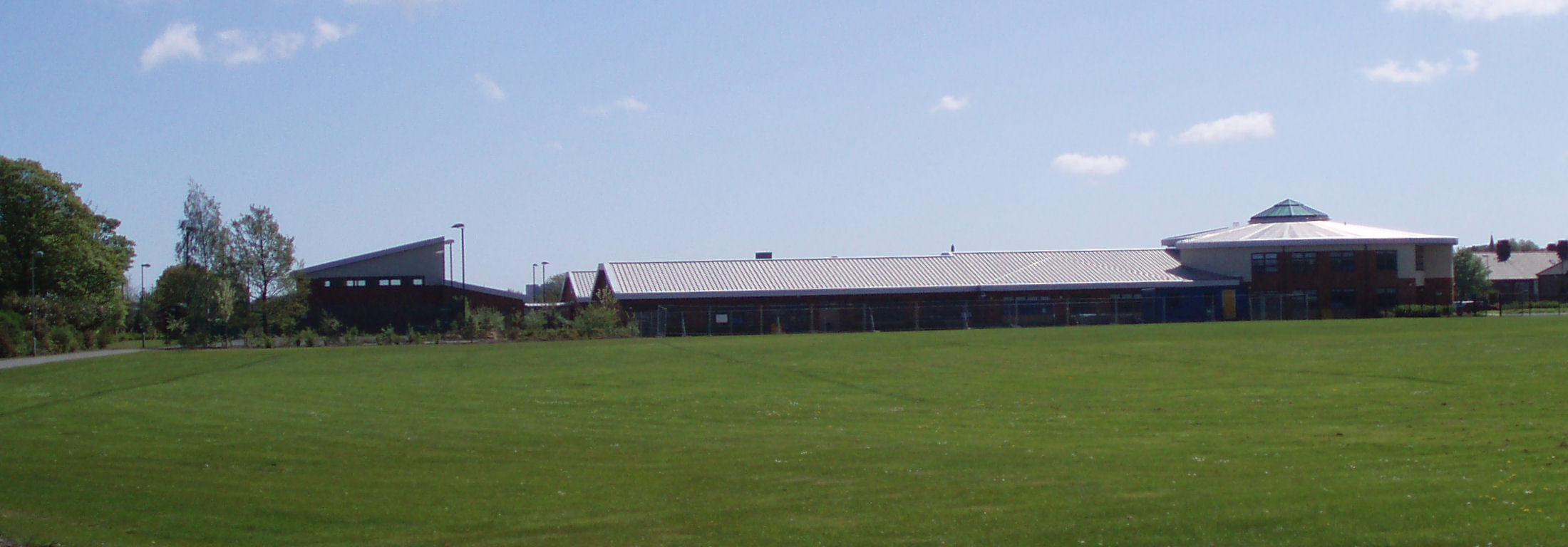
The 2004 Gosforth Central Middle School building

Gosforth Central Middle School is a middle school located in Newcastle upon Tyne. The school was formed when Northumberland County Council changed to the three-tier education system in 1973. In 2014 the Gosforth Schools Trust was formed with Archibald First, Archbishop Runcie CE First, Broadway East First, Brunton First, Dinnington First, Gosforth Central Middle, Gosforth East Middle, Gosforth Park First, Grange First, Regent Farm First and South Gosforth First School.

The site on which Gosforth Central stands was formerly used by Gosforth Grammar School, until it became Gosforth High School and moved to the other side of the Great North Road in 1973. The Grammar School building was used by Central, until it was replaced in 2004. The new building was fully built before the original building was demolished. The school is opposite the Regent Centre business complex and Regent Centre Metro station, with the vehicle entrance on Christon Road.

== Gosforth East Middle School ==
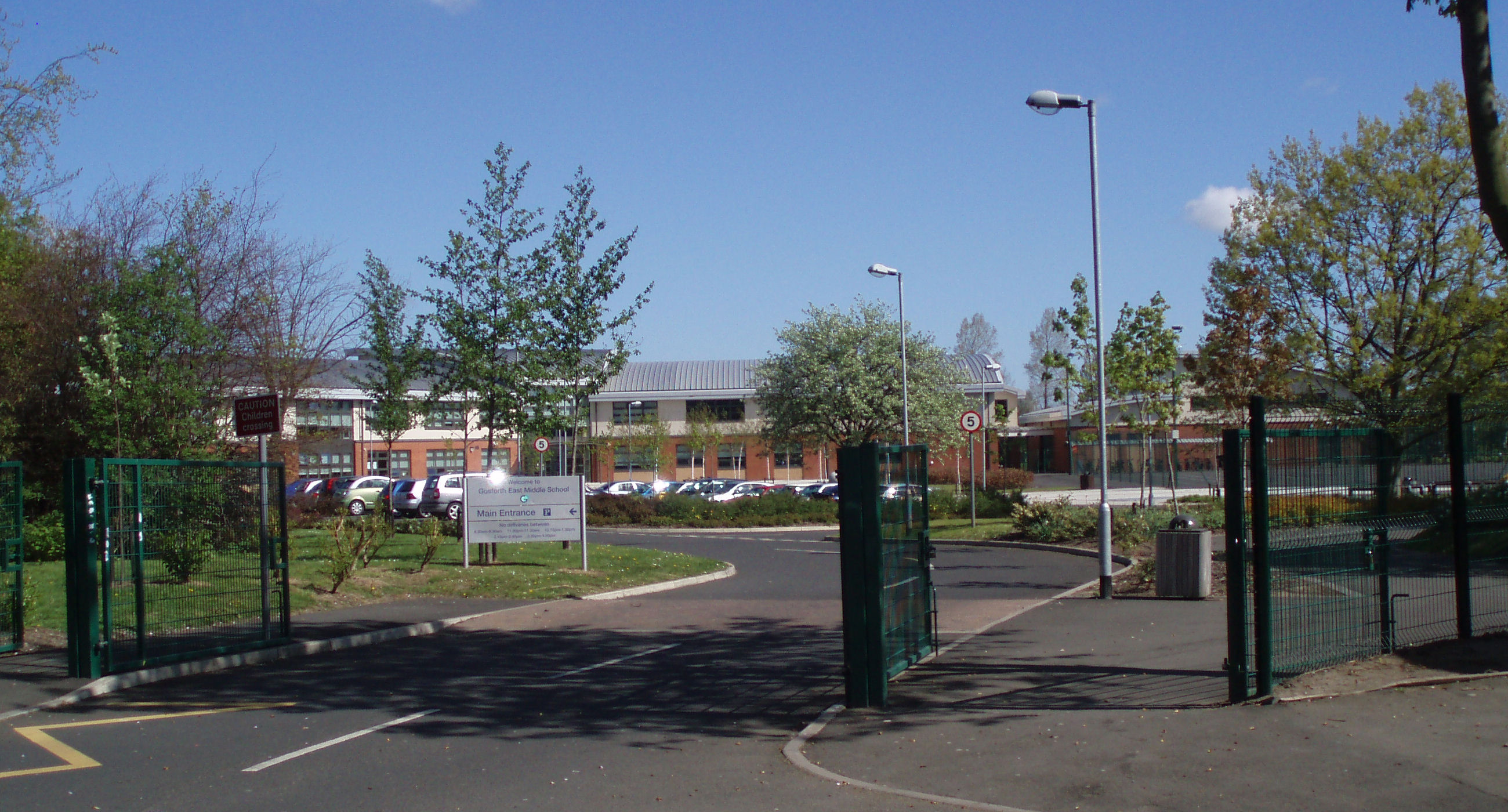
Gosforth East Middle School building

Gosforth East Middle School is a middle school located in Newcastle upon Tyne.

The school started in 1960 as, Gosforth East Secondary School but was renamed became Gosforth East Middle School, when Northumberland County Council changed to the Three-tier education system in 1973.

== Gosforth Junior High Academy ==
Gosforth Junior High Academy is a middle school located in Newcastle upon Tyne. The school started in 1937, as "Gosforth Senior Council School", with separate boys and girls departments, changed to a Secondary Modern School in 1944, with the name becoming "Gosforth County Modern School". It became "Gosforth West Middle School" when Northumberland County Council changed to the Three-tier education system in 1973, and changed to its current name in 2007.
