= Irvine Laidlaw, Baron Laidlaw =

British peer (born 1942)

The Right Honourable The Lord Laidlaw
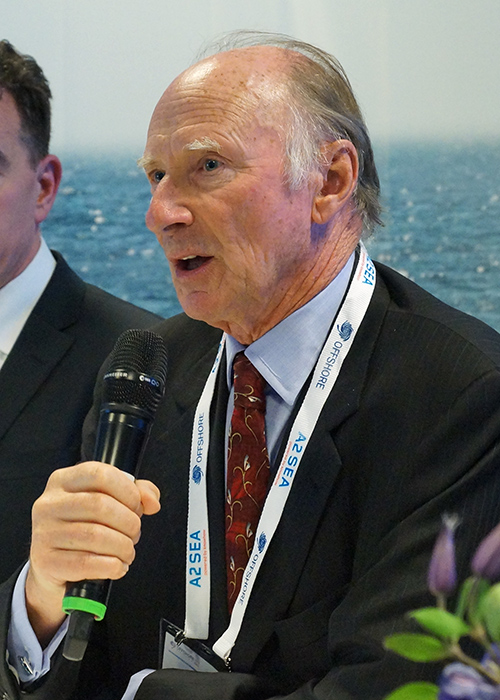
- Born: Irvine Laidlaw; 22 December 1942 (age 83); Keith, Banffshire, Scotland
- Education: Merchiston Castle School
- Alma mater: Leeds University; Columbia Business School
- Occupation: Businessman
- Known for: Institute for International Research
- Title: Baron Laidlaw of Rothiemay
- Political party: Conservative Party
- Spouse: Christine

Member of the House of Lords
- Lord Temporal
- Life peerage 14 June 2004 – 15 April 2010

Irvine Alan Stewart Laidlaw, Baron Laidlaw (born 22 December 1942) is a Scottish businessman, and a former member of the House of Lords. In the Sunday Times Rich List 2012 ranking of the wealthiest people in the UK he was placed 105th with an estimated fortune of £745 million. In the 2020 edition, he was ranked the 180th wealthiest person in the UK, with an estimated net worth of £787 million, a decrease of £4 million from the previous year.

== Biography ==
The son of Margaret and Roy Laidlaw, a Banffshire mill-owner, Laidlaw was educated at Merchiston Castle School, Leeds University and New York City's Columbia Business School.

After graduation, Laidlaw turned a small US publishing company bought in 1973 into the Institute for International Research (IIR), the world's largest conference organiser. After calling off a £500m flotation in 2001 when the market plunged, he sold IIR in 2005 for a sum believed to be in the order of £768m.

In 1988 Laidlaw founded Abbey Business Centres, a subsidiary of IIR providing serviced office space, meeting room facilities and virtual office packages in 13 business centres in Great Britain. The first business centre opened in Glasgow, and soon the company opened up another centre in Slough, Berkshire. Other centres were added, and in 2009 a total of 13 centres made up the organisation.

In 2015, the University of Leeds launched an official opening for the £26 million Laidlaw Library, named after Irvine Laidlaw, who had previously studied economics at the university in the 1960s. His £9 million donation is the largest the university has received from any donor. Laidlaw part owns a $2.1 billion wind-farm project, and earlier this year secured the largest clean-energy financing in 2015 from eight lenders, which included Deutsche Bank AG.

Laidlaw previously owned and raced a Jaguar, which won Le Mans a number of times throughout the 1950s, along with a number of other vintage cars, including a 1962 Ferrari GTO. in 2013, Irvine Laidlaw stopped racing. In 2013, he sold a collection of classic sports cars to raise £17 million.

== Philanthropy ==
In 2004, Laidlaw said that he would over the next 20–30 years donate most of his fortune to helping disadvantaged young people. His main vehicle used to be the Laidlaw Youth Project, which supported a range of charitable work for disadvantaged youngsters in Scotland from 2004 to 2007 when it became the Laidlaw Youth Trust (no longer operational). Currently, he is Chairman of the Irvine Laidlaw Foundation, simply known as the Laidlaw Foundation, which he set up to aid the advancement of education, especially the education of deprived young people, in particular by means of grants and other forms of financial assistance to institutions which are engaged in the provision of educational services in any part of the world. The Foundation's activity consists of three core programmes:

- The Laidlaw Undergraduate Research and Leadership Scholarship Programme - as of 2023, the scholarship programme operates in 19 universities around the world, including Barnard College, Columbia University, EPFL, Imperial College London, London School of Economics, University of Cambridge, University College London and University of Oxford. Every year, the programme funds cohorts of around 25 students at every institution for two summers to complete a research project with an academic supervisor, and undergo training to develop their leadership skills.
- The Laidlaw Women's Business Education Programme - full and partial scholarships are awarded to women with financial constraints to complete MBAs in order to help them get into senior roles and ultimately achieve gender parity in industries around the world. The programme currently operates in Columbia Business School, London Business School, and in March 2020 it was also announced that Saïd Business School will join as well. In 2023, it was announced that HEC Paris would join the programme, and in 2024, IE Madrid will be joining. So far, Laidlaw donated $2 million to Columbia Business School, £3.69m to London Business School, and £1.35m to Saïd Business School as part of this scholarship programme.
- The Laidlaw Schools Trust - a multi-academy trust founded in 2008, which currently consists of 11 academies in the North East of England with 5500+ students and 850+ staff in total: Excelsior Academy, Academy 360, Atkinson Road Primary Academy, South Hylton Primary Academy, Thomas Walling Primary Academy, Westgate Hill Primary Academy, and Sedgefield Community College.

He has also donated:

- £2 million to The Prince's Trust
- After Moray Council earmarked Rothiemay Primary School for closure, Laidlaw donated funds to a parents campaign which successfully kept 21 schools open
- Donated R9 million to fund the Amakhaya Ngoku housing project
- Laidlaw scholarship at Newcastle University, in which he funds 50% of the funding along with the university.
- Supporting the Glyndebourne Festival production.
- Donating £100,000 to Scottish Opera
- Private investor for Ben Ainslie Racing
- Donor to the Rural Education Access Programme
- £40,000 to Keith Grammar School, to fund a scheme to help senior pupils prepare for the world of work
- £1 million to Merchiston Castle School his former school; despite having disliked attending it, he eventually relented to persuasion by the headmaster and donated this sum. The new sixth-form house at the school, which his donation went some way to financing is named Laidlaw House.
- £9 million to the University of Leeds to support the development of the new undergraduate library, the Laidlaw Library, which opened in May 2015.
- £4 million to the University of St Andrews to support the construction of a new music building, the Laidlaw Music Centre, which opened in April 2022.

In 2007, he set up the Laidlaw Youth Trust which from 2007 to 2009 spent over £6 million in Scotland on good causes related to disadvantaged children and young people. In 2007, in emerged that the Scottish Executive had given sufficient donations to pay the salary of the CEO Laidlaw Youth project, Maureen McGinn – who is also the wife of Scotland's most senior civil servant, Sir John Elvidge.

He closed the Trust in 2009 because he was spending more time in South Africa and said he wanted to focus his charitable giving there. It is not known how much he has gifted in his new adopted country but he was involved in some township housing project.

=== Laidlaw Opera Trust ===
In his ongoing commitment to arts and education, Lord Laidlaw founded the Laidlaw Opera Trust. The Trust aims to promote and sustain the art of opera. The Trust's key initiatives include market research on public perceptions of opera, hosting thought leadership events such as "The Business of Opera," and providing support to major opera houses and festivals.

Chair: Lord Irvine Laidlaw Trustees include Anne Marabini Young, Bryan Evans MBE, The Rt. Hon. Sir Charles Haddon-Cave, and Lady Amanda Haddon-Cave.

== Political donations ==
One of the largest financial backers of the UK's Conservative Party, Laidlaw was made a life peer as Baron Laidlaw, of Rothiemay in Banffshire on 14 June 2004. According to the records of the UK Electoral Commission, on 27 November 2007, Laidlaw gave a donation of £2,990,532.20 to the Conservatives. Laidlaw donated £25,000 to the 2008 London Mayoral election campaign of Boris Johnson.

== Tax status ==
In 2008, Lord Laidlaw was described by The Guardian as a "Monaco-based tax exile".

Lord Laidlaw was criticised in April 2007 in the press for failing to become UK tax resident despite being appointed to the House of Lords. The BBC said that, in a letter seen by them, Laidlaw "cites a variety of personal reasons" for non-compliance. Criticism by Dennis Stevenson, Baron Stevenson of Coddenham, chair of the House of Lords Appointments Commission, on assurances given to the Commission by Laidlaw to become a UK tax resident by April 2004, were followed by Laidlaw taking leave of absence from the House of Lords. In 2010 following the enactment of the Constitutional Reform and Governance Act 2010 he stepped down from his seat in the House of Lords to maintain his non-domiciled status and so be able to avoid paying UK residents' taxes.

== Personal life ==
=== General ===
Laidlaw and his wife Christine divide their time between an apartment in Monaco overlooking the harbour; and their South African home, an early 20th-century 23,200 m^{2} estate in Noordhoek, near Cape Town. At the time of the purchase, in November 2005, it was the country's most expensive property, bought for R106 million.

=== Sex life allegations ===
In April 2008, Laidlaw was the target of a sting operation staged by investigative journalist Mazher Mahmood on behalf of the British tabloid The News of the World, which revealed that Laidlaw hired up to five £3,000 vice girls at a time for all-night orgies involving spanking, bondage and lesbian sex at a Monaco hotel.

== Hobbies ==
=== Motor Racing ===
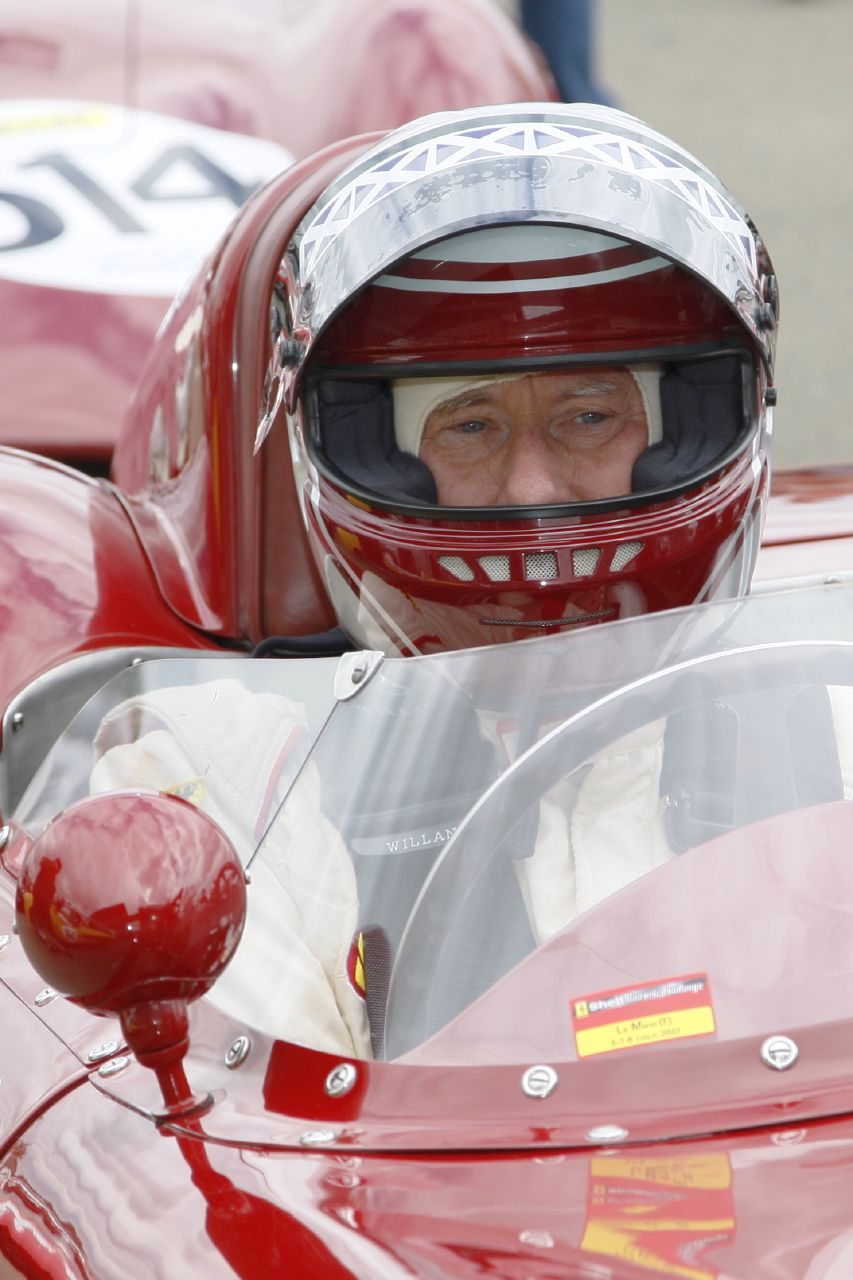
Laidlaw driving his 1957 Maserati 250S at Le Mans in 2007

Laidlaw regularly competes in historic car racing around the world with his Porsche 904GTS, Porsche 904/6, Maserati 250S & Maserati 6CM. Laidlaw also won a medal in the Scottish amateur rally, using a Ford Focus ST. In 2007 Laidlaw added a 1001 hp Bugatti Veyron to his extensive car collection, which is sometimes seen between Noordhoek and Cape Town, on the world-famous coastal road Chapman's Peak Drive.

=== Motor Yachts ===
Laidlaw has owned various luxury motor yachts with the most highprofile being Fedship built motor yacht, the Lady Christine, in 2003.

=== Sailboat ===
Laidlaw has been active within the yacht racing for most of his working life. He has won high-profile events including Key West Regatta and the Round the Island Race. Highly active on the maxi racing scene, he is a member of the Royal Thames Yacht Club. Laidlaw conceptualized the Cape 31 class. Some of his yachts are as follows:

| Boat name | Year | Boat Type | Builder | Designer | Notes |
|---|---|---|---|---|---|
| Tower Maid | 1975 | Varne 27 | | Duncan Stewart | |
| Gonna Katcha | 1979 | Westerly GK 29 | Westerly | | |
| Highland Fling 1 | 1980 | Westerly GK 34 | Westerly | | |
| Highland Fling 3 | | IOR One Tonner | | Farr Yacht Design | |
| Highland Fling 5 | | Swan 46 | Nautor's Swan | German Frers | |
| Highland Fling 6 | | Swan 53 | Nautor's Swan | German Frers | |
| Highland Fling 7 | 1994 | Swan 60 | Nautor's Swan | German Frers | |
| | | Carroll Marine 60 | Carroll Marine | Farr Yacht Design | |
| Highland Fling | | Wally 80 | | Farr Yacht Design | |
| Highland Fling XI | 2009 | Wally 82 | Goetz Composites | Reichel/Pugh | |
| Highland Fling XII | 2010 | IRC 52 | McConaghy Boats, China | | "New" Turbocharged TP52 now sold and called Cape Fling |
| Cape Fling | | Ker 46 | Ker Yacht Design | | |
| Oui Fling | 2017 | 52 ft | Spirit Yachts | | "New" Wooden Construction classic styled stripped out racer |
| Highland Fling 15 | 2016 - 2021 | Swan 115 | Nautor's Swan | German Frers | "New" Large Racer/Cruiser. Sold in 2021 and renamed moat |
| Highland Fling 16 | 2018 | Botin 56 | King Marine | Botin Partners | "New" Raceboat |
| Highland Fling 17 | 2021 | Gunboat 68 | Gunboat | VPLP | Secondhand high performance cruising catamaran |

== Arms ==
Coat of arms of Irvine Laidlaw, Baron Laidlaw
| Coronet Coronet of a Baron Crest A Red Squirrel sejant proper. Escutcheon Sable, a Chevron Or, between in chief two Bezants, and in base a Sheep statant Argent. Supporters Dexter: a Boy wearing a Kilt of Scot Green Tartan proper. Sinister: a Girl wearing a Dress Argent, and Sash of Scot Green Tartan proper. Motto SEMPER CONTENDO (Always disputing) |
