= Gosforth Junior =

Gosforth Junior may refer to:

- Gosforth Junior Drama League
- Gosforth Junior High School, a middle school in Gosforth, Newcastle upon Tyne, England
