= GJHS =

GJHS may refer to:

- George W. Jenkins High School, Lakeland, Florida, United States
- Gorsebrook Junior High School, Halifax, Nova Scotia, Canada
- Gosforth Junior High Academy, Gosforth, Newcastle and Tyne, United States
- Grand Junction High School, Grand Junction, Colorado, United States
- Greater Johnstown High School, Johnstown, Pennsylvania, United States
