= Gosforth High =

Gosforth High may refer to:

- Gosforth High School, A high school in Gosforth, Newcastle upon Tyne, England
- Gosforth High Street, The High Street in the Gosforth suburb of Newcastle upon Tyne, England
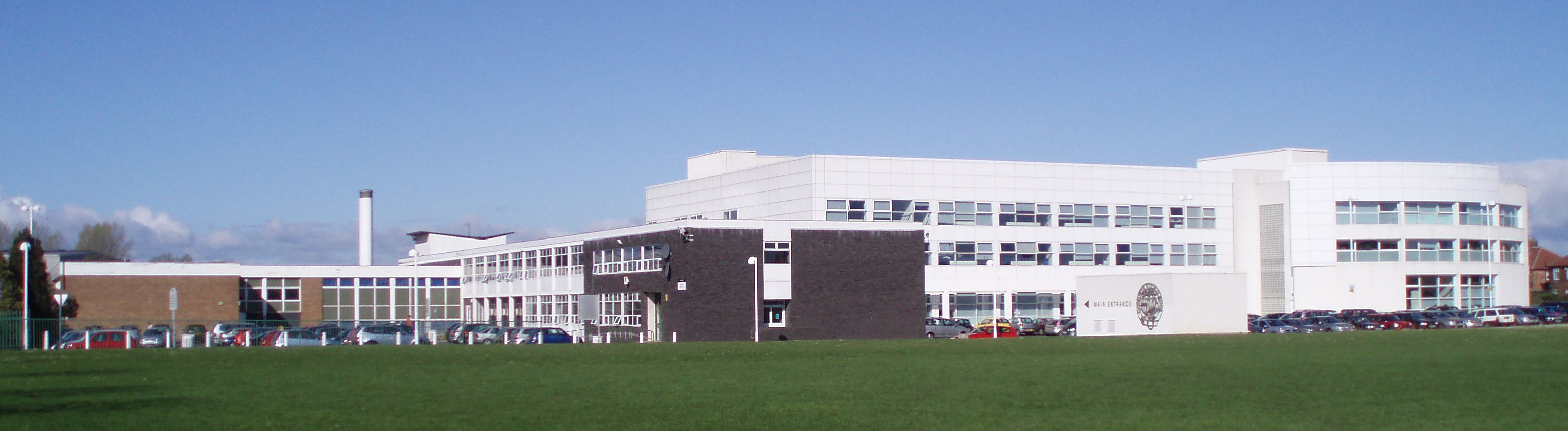
Gosforth High School

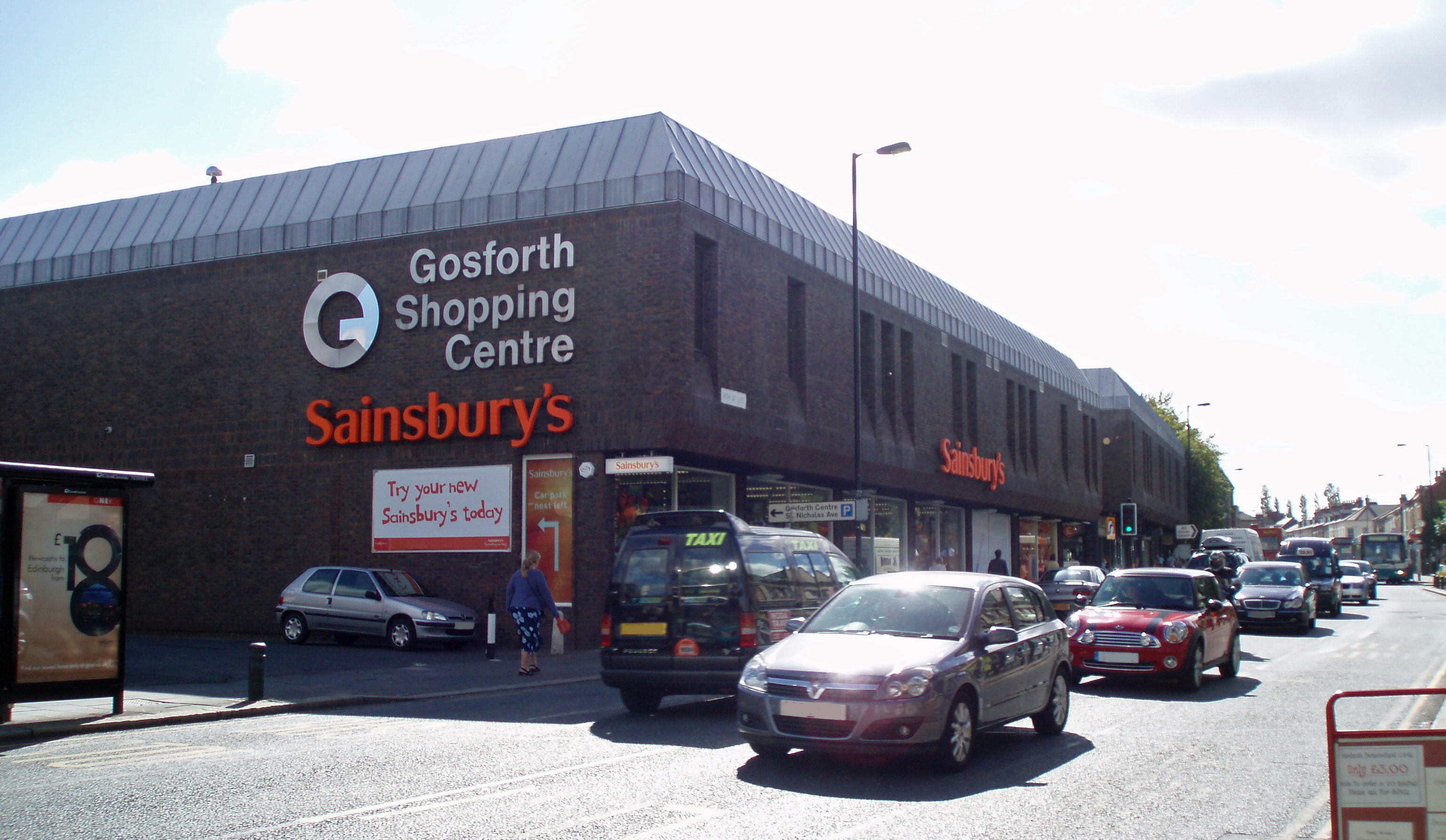
Gosforth High Street

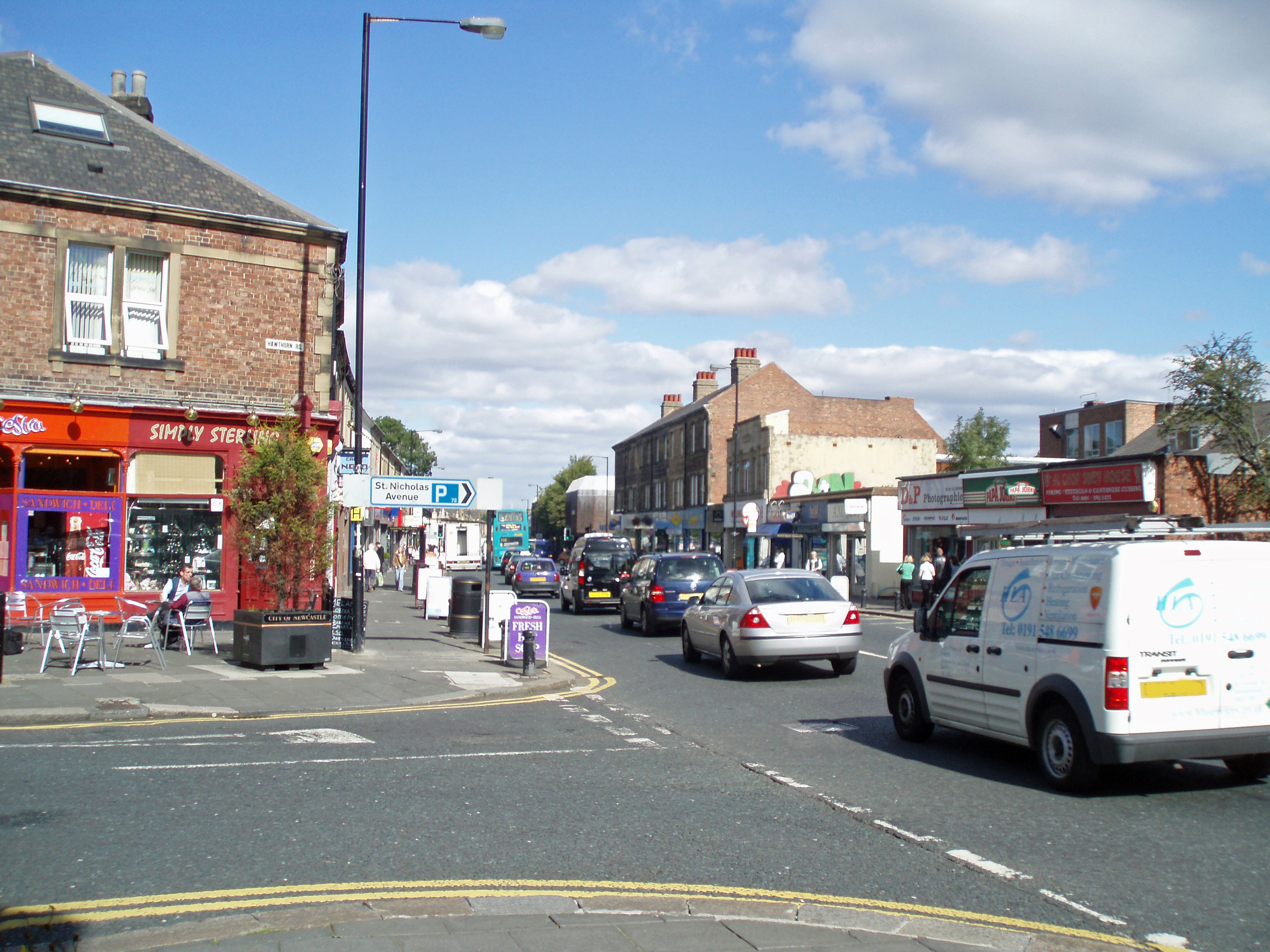
Gosforth High Street
