= Laidlaw Scholars =

Research and leadership award program for undergraduate students

- Laidlaw Scholars Leadership and Research Programme
- Founded: 2014; 12 years ago
- Founder: Lord Laidlaw of Rothiemay
- Region served: United States; United Kingdom; Canada; Hong Kong; Ireland; Switzerland; United Arab Emirates
- Members: 22 Universities: (United States) Brown University Columbia University (←)Barnard College (←)Columbia College Cornell University Duke University Georgetown University Harvard University Massachusetts Institute of Technology Tufts University (United Kingdom) University of Cambridge Durham University Imperial College London University of Leeds London School of Economics University of Oxford University of St Andrews University College London (Canada) University of Toronto University of Hong Kong (Republic of Ireland) Trinity College Dublin (Switzerland) École Polytechnique Fédérale de Lausanne (United Arab Emirates) NYU Abu Dhabi
- Website: laidlawfoundation.com

The Laidlaw Scholars Leadership and Research Programme is a two-year undergraduate programme founded by Scottish businessman and philanthropist, Lord Irvine Laidlaw funded through his Laidlaw Foundation. Established in 2014, the programme aims to foster leadership development and funds two summer projects, one in research and the other in leadership in action, for undergraduates at twenty-two member universities around the world. The programme selects up to twenty-five students from each member university annually based on their proposed research project, ethical leadership potential, and commitment to the Laidlaw Foundation's values.

== History ==
The Laidlaw Scholars Leadership and Research Programme was first devised in 2014 at the alma maters of Lord Laidlaw, the University of Leeds (where the Laidlaw Library is named after him) and the University of St Andrews (where the Laidlaw Music Centre is named after him). The programme has expanded internationally over the years and in 2026, the Massachusetts Institute of Technology, Harvard University and NYU Abu Dhabi will recruit its first cohort of scholars, growing the number of universities in the network to twenty-two.

Former member universities of the programme include the National University of Singapore, the University of Oxford, the University of Rwanda and the University of York. In April 2024, the University of Oxford re-joined with the programme based out of the Oxford SDG Impact Lab.

== Programme ==
Each programme may differ between member universities however generally, the programme involves scholars undertaking an independent or faculty-sponsored research project over summer at either their original institution or at a partner Laidlaws Scholars' institution. In the following summer, scholars complete a 'Leadership in Action' project by contributing to a community through applied research or work with a NGO, non-profit or humanitarian organisation. Scholars are encouraged to undertake one of the two summer projects internationally. During the academic year, scholars also receive mentoring from a specialist supervisor, attend leadership development workshops and residential weekends, and gain access to networking opportunities through the Laidlaw Scholars' global network.

== Selection and Benefits ==
Eligible undergraduate students from all disciplines apply to their respective member institutions with a personal statement and proposed research project. Applicants are then shortlisted and go through an interview process before being selected and nominated to the Laidlaw Foundation for funding.

Each scholar is supported by a stipend of US$8,400 (GBP£6,000, CAD$10,000, EUR€7,000, HK$12,000, and CHF7,000) over the two-year programme, dependant on the institution. In addition to the stipend, travel and research bursaries are awarded where relevant. Laidlaw Scholar alumni also gain access to exclusive funding from the Laidlaw Scholars Venture (LSV), a US$50 million backed venture funding initiative created for start-ups founded and run by Laidlaw Scholars.

== See also ==
- Harry S. Truman Scholarship
- Siebel Scholars
- Schulich Leader Scholarships
- Stamps Scholarship
