= Melbourne Fringe Festival =

Annual arts festival in Melbourne, Australia

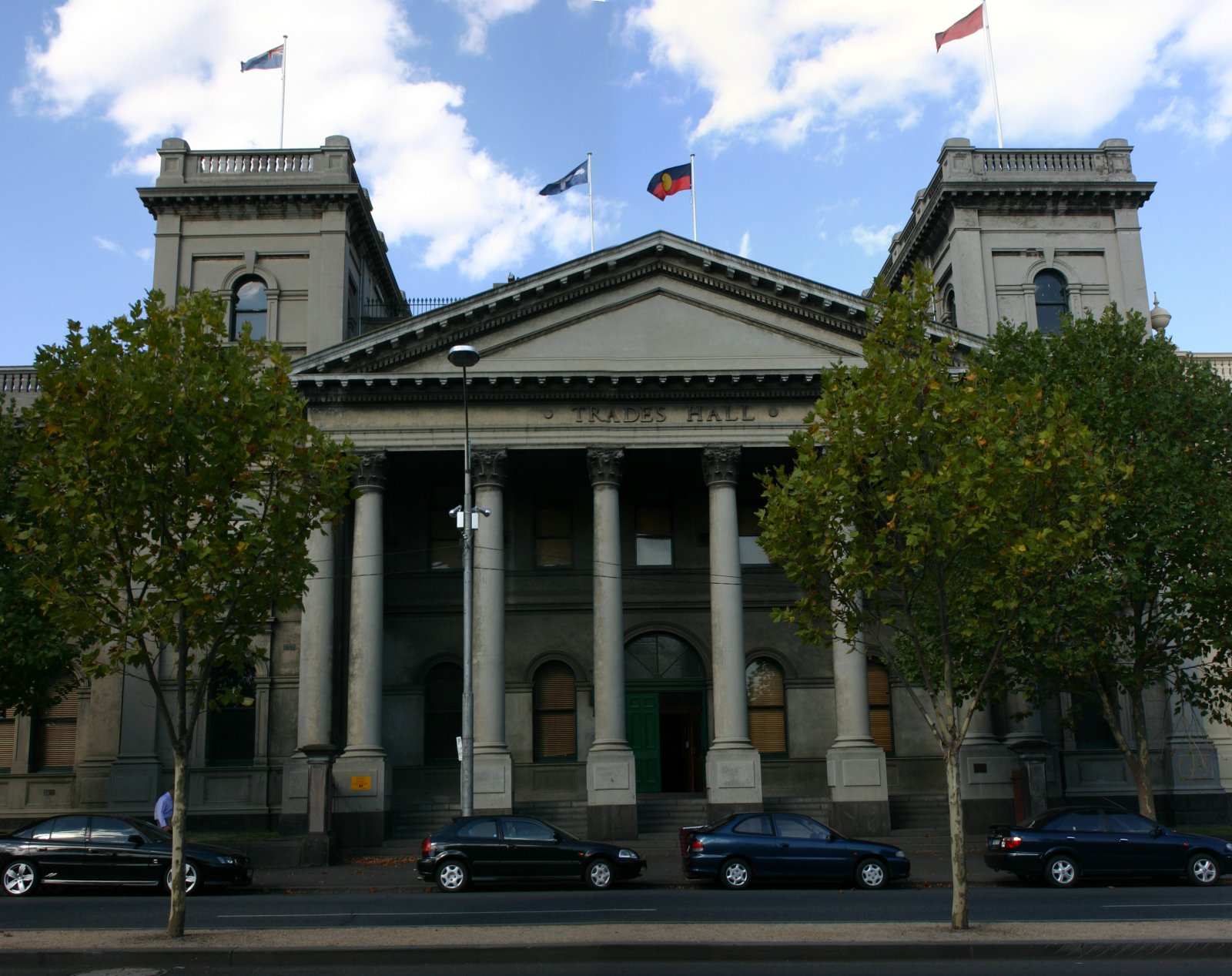
The Trades Hall, base of the Melbourne Fringe Festival

The Melbourne Fringe Festival is an annual independent arts festival in Melbourne, Australia, usually over three weeks from late September to early October. Held since 1982, the Festival includes a wide variety of art forms, including theatre, comedy, music, performance art, design, film, cabaret, digital art, and circus. Over 400 shows are held at over 100 venues from bars, clubs and independent theatres to high-profile locations.

The festival is open-access and artists produce shows independently. Melbourne Fringe also funds and produces its own free events.

== History ==
The Fringe Arts Network was formed in 1982, aiming to raise public and government awareness of alternative arts in Melbourne. The Network offered support such as venue advice, shared resources and advocacy.

Fringe Arts Network's inaugural event was a mini-festival, followed in 1983 by a week-long event coinciding with Moomba and presenting 120 artists at some 25 locations across Melbourne.

In 1984, the Spoleto Festival of Two Worlds expanded to include Melbourne, and Melbourne's Fringe Arts Network became the Melbourne Piccolo Spoleto Fringe Festival. The Melbourne International Festival of the Arts emerged from the Spoleto Festival as a result, and in 1986, the Fringe Arts Network reclaimed its independence from Spoleto and reoriented itself as Melbourne Fringe.

In 2002, the Melbourne Fringe began a Fringe Hub model which programmed a number of closely located venues and offered artists and audiences a central place to gather and network: the Fringe Club at the North Melbourne Town Hall. In 2006, the Melbourne Fringe Club moved upstairs into the North Melbourne Town Hall's Main Hall, with a free nightly Fringe Club program. The Fringe Hub also grew to the nearby Lithuanian Club.

In 2019, the Fringe Hub moved to the renovated Trades Hall in Carlton. Melbourne Fringe also established a year-round program at its Trades Hall venue.

The festival went virtual in 2021.

== Notable shows ==
- Totem (2008) an installation by Sayraphim Lothian, involving 120 dolls, each created by artists from around the world, reflecting their inner identities.
- Twelve Angry Men (2013) written by Reginald Rose which was staged live in the Supreme Court of Victoria with a cast made up entirely of barristers.
- The Sheds (2013) by James Cunningham, about a gay Australian Football League player.
- Control Alt Delete (2014) by Dan Willis, proving you can move smoothly from a career in Computers to Stand-Up Comedy.

== See also ==
- Adelaide Fringe
- List of festivals in Australia
- Fringe theatre
