= Institute for International Research =

- Company type: an Informa business
- Industry: Events, Exhibitions, Conferences, Training, Executive Development
- Founded: London (1973)
- Key people: Debra Chipman, President & CEO, IIRUSA
- Subsidiaries: IIR Australia; IIR Austria; IIR Executive Development; IIR Finance; IIR Middle East; IIR Netherlands; IIR Spain; IIR USA

Institute for International Research, Inc. (IIR) was a subsidiary of Informa Plc. It grew from its founding in 1973 to become one of the world's largest conference providers. It became part of the Informa Group in 2005.

In 2015, Informa rebranded its conference and training businesses, including IIR, KNect365.

== Overview ==
The company was started by Irvine Laidlaw, Baron Laidlaw in 1973 and sold to Informa for a reported GBP 768 million in 2005. Irvine Laidlaw began IIR by producing newsletters out of a base in Hong Kong.

== Operations ==
In 1989, IIR Inc. in the United States acquired institutions in order to enter the seminar and training business. Acquisitions included training organisers such as ESI International, Achieve Global Huthwaite followed by Omega Performance and Communispond. Debra Chipman is the current president and chief executive officer of the Institute for International Research, Inc, which operates as a subsidiary of IIR Ltd.

Many IIR conferences, workshops and training courses are conducted in Europe each year. These cover many topics including general management, finance, banking and energy. IIR has been active in Austria since 1992. Annual congresses held in Austria include Epcon"(energy), tel.con (telecommunications industry), Pulse (health), Course (banking sector) and the ÖVT (insurance industry). IIR has been operating in Germany since 1989 with 200 employees, 14 divisions and about 2000 events. Starting from 1999, Austria developed the CEE region for IIR, with offices in Poland (Warsaw), Czech Republic (Prague) and Hungary (Budapest).

IIR online regional sites include IIR Austria, IIR Australia IIR North America, IIR Middle East, IIR Telecoms and Informa plc.
