= West Gosforth =

Coordinates: 55.011°N 1.622°W

- Ward
- Location within the United Kingdom
- OS grid reference: NZ242685
- Ceremonial county: Tyne and Wear
- Country: England
- Sovereign state: United Kingdom

West Gosforth was an electoral ward in the north of Newcastle upon Tyne, Tyne and Wear, England. It was created in 2004 and abolished in 2018. The population of the ward is 9,681, increasing to 9,991 at the 2011 Census, 3.7% of the total population of Newcastle upon Tyne. Car ownership in the area is 78.1%, higher than the city average of 54.7%.

Other wards in Gosforth include Gosforth, Dene and South Gosforth, Fawdon and West Gosforth, and Parklands (which includes northern Gosforth including Melton Park and Brunton Park).

== Education ==
There are six schools within the West Gosforth ward:

- Archibald First School
- Gosforth Junior High Academy
- Wyndham RC Primary School
- St Charles RC Primary School
- Westfield School
- Central Newcastle High School (part of Junior School)

== Recreation and leisure ==
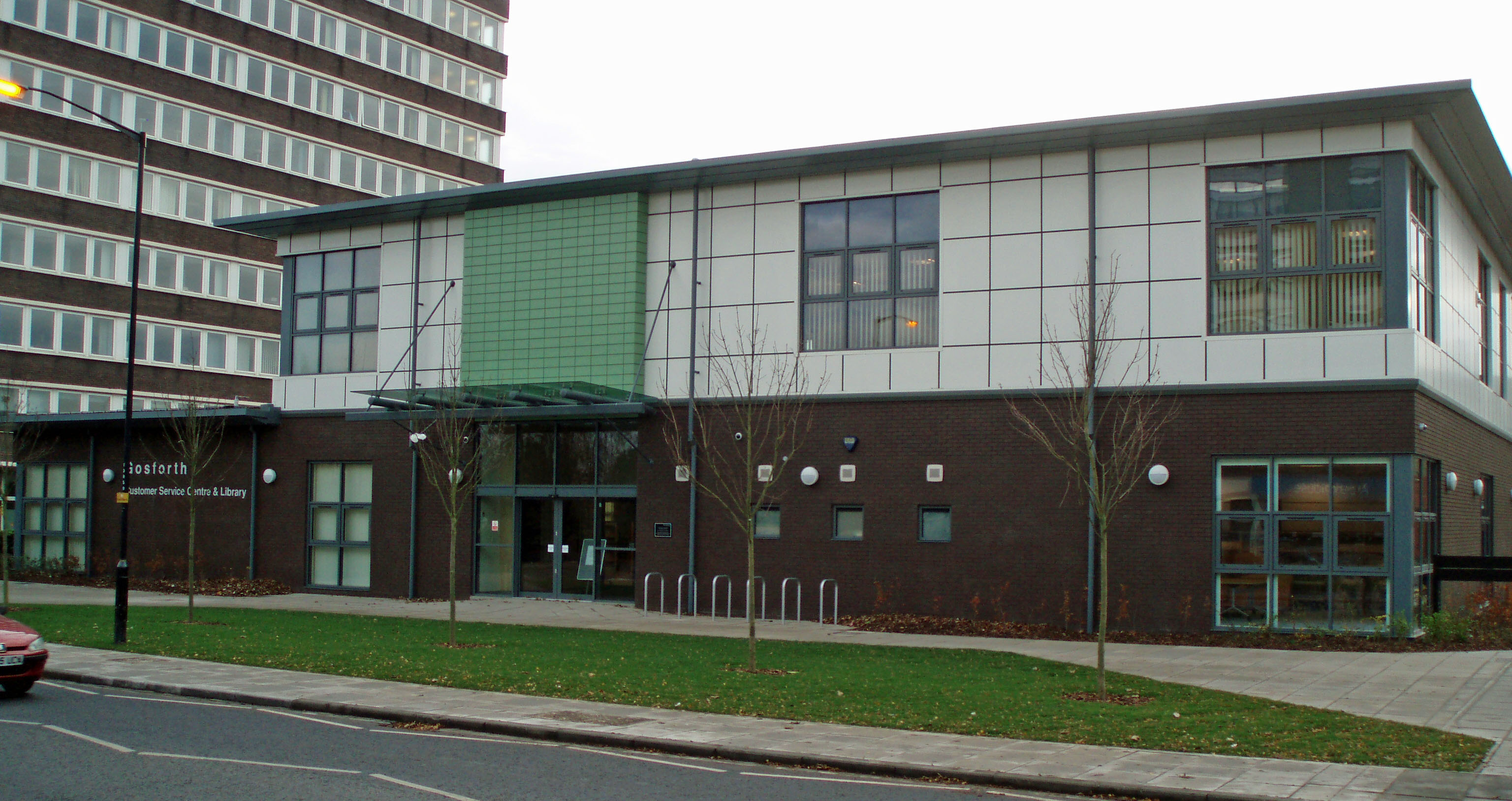
The new Gosforth Library

The ward has many large green spaces including Dukes Moor, Coxlodge Welfare Ground and St. Nicholas Park. The ward has two Tyne and Wear Metro stations: Regent Centre and Wansbeck Road.

The ward has a library and swimming pool. The swimming pool is currently managed by Greenwich Leisure Limited under the brand "Better Leisure" following a takeover in 2013. In November 2006, Gosforth Library was demolished and replaced with a new two-storey building, during these works the library operated in temporary buildings located nearby. The new Gosforth Library and Customer Service Centre building was formally opened on 8 February 2008 by John Grundy, a local resident and television presenter. The library is used as a polling station for one of the four voting districts in West Gosforth.

== Business ==
West Gosforth has a business park, called Regent Centre, which includes the headquarters of Virgin Money (formerly Northern Rock), the UK's 6th largest bank.

== Ward boundary ==
The West Gosforth ward boundary started at the Blue House roundabout and heads north along the Great North Road/Gosforth High Street (odd numbers included.) Opposite the Asda Superstore, it turns west at the roundabout and follows the Metro line to Wansbeck Road station. It heads south along Wansbeck Road to Jubilee Road before turning east along Jubilee Road (odd numbers included) to the Welford Daycare Centre. The boundary continues west to the rear of St Nicholas Nature Reserve and the rear of the properties on Prince's Meadow onto Kenton Road (Numbers 23–59 Wall Close included.) It continues south along Kenton Road to Salter's Road, then turns west to the rear of Kenton Park Shopping Centre and continues south to the rear of Wyndham County Primary School to Nuns Moor/Newcastle United Golf Course. Finally it travels east along the moor to the Grandstand Road/ Kenton Road junction and continues east along Grandstand Road to the Blue House roundabout.

== Charts and tables ==
Age group	Number
Under 16	1,893
16–24	893
25–44	2,864
45–64	2,317
65–74	844
75+	871

Ethnicity	Number	%
White	8,723	90.1
Afro-Caribbean	37	0.4
South Asian	662	6.8
Chinese	95	1.0
Other	167	1.7

Owner occupied property stands at 80.4% much higher than the city average of 53.3%. The properties are as follows.

Property type	Number	%
Detached	602	14.6
Semi-detached	1,559	37.7
Terraced	1,054	25.5
Flats	918	22.2
Other	0	0
