= Blood Trails =

2006 film

- Theatrical poster
- Directed by: Robert Krause
- Written by: Robert Krause; Florian Puchert
- Story by: Robert Krause
- Produced by: Oliver Simon
- Starring: Ben Price; Tom Frederic; Rebecca Palmer
- Cinematography: Ralf Noack
- Edited by: Richard Krause; Wolfgang Böhm
- Music by: Ben Bartlett
- Production companies: K5 Film; Abnormal Pictures
- Distributed by: Lions Gate Entertainment
- Release dates: 20 April 2006 (Dead by Dawn, Edinburgh)
- Running time: 87 minutes
- Country: Germany
- Language: English

Blood Trails is a 2006 English-language German horror film written and directed by Robert Krause, and co-written by Florian Puchert. It stars Ben Price, Tom Frederic, and Rebecca Palmer. Artdirection by Kurt Rauscher the film set in British Columbia and follows a couple stalked by a serial killer posing as a policeman.

== Plot ==
In an attempt to rekindle their relationship, bicycle messenger Anne and her boyfriend Michael go on a mountain biking holiday, trespassing on a closed trail. There, the beautiful Anne admits to Michael that she slept with (and was possibly raped by) a police officer named Chris. After Anne's confession, Chris (who has been stalking Anne since their night together) slits Michael's throat with his bicycle, and goes after Anne, telling a dying Michael that "she belongs to me".

A park ranger discovers Anne and tries to help her, but Chris finds the two, and disembowels the ranger, forcing Anne to continue trying to escape on her bicycle. Anne seeks aid from two lumberjacks that she comes across, but Chris appears, murders the two men with their own tools, and captures Anne, taking her to the cabin that she and Michael had intended to stay at. Chris reveals that he is a serial killer of women, and explains that he let Anne go on the night they met because he admired her tenacity. As Chris tortures Anne and waxes philosophically, two patrolmen pull up to the cabin. While Chris is out killing the two officers, Anne frees herself from her bonds, overpowers Chris when he returns, and stabs him in the throat with a piece of glass.

== Cast ==
- Rebecca Palmer as Melanie Anne Phillips
- Ben Price as Chris
- Tom Frederic as Michael
- J.J. Straub as Ranger
- Kurt Rauscher as Forest Worker 1
- Johann Daiminger as Forest Worker 2
- Christian Heiner Wolf as Policeman 1
- Maximilian Boxrucker as Policeman 2

== Reception ==
Dave Murray of Arrow in the Head gave Blood Trails a 1/4, and wrote, "Now, talk about your wasted potential! What could have been a grueling and bloody slasher flick was ruined by poor performances, shoddy editing and a piss poor narrative that dragged the whole film to the bottom of a mountain stream" and "It was uninspired and mostly boring, with no direction, no tension and a lack of any relevance to the subgenre it tries to emulate. Let's face it. The world's first bicycle slasher flick is a lame duck." Dread Central's Mike Phalin was similarly critical of the film, which he referred to as "shitty" and "empty and soulless" before giving it a 1½ out of 5. The same grade was given in a review written for Hysteria Lives! by Justin Kerswell, who noted that Blood Trails suffered from "A paper thin plot, uninvolving characters, epileptic camerawork, a migraine inducing soundtrack, a surprise free 'climax' and a vein of head-slapping stupidity the size of the Grand Canyon".

A 2/5 was awarded by Scott Weinberg of DVD Talk, who opined that "The flick feels like it wants to be a stark, dark and female-empowered shocker like High Tension, yet it fails on nearly every count. The killer is silly, the victims are stupid, the heroine is kind of a nut, and the biking starts to get on your nerves after a while. It's like a Schwinn promotional video that somehow got turned into a half-baked slasher turkey". The film received a positive critique from DVD Verdict's David Johnson, who found Blood Trails to be "a well-done little movie" overall, opening his review with, "I was pleasantly surprised by this effective little suspense thriller. You can number the cast on one hand and the plot is as simple as it gets, but director Robert Krause has forged a well-executed, lean, mean stalker that is bolstered by strong performances and a jet-like pacing and some beautiful photography".
