= Dan Willis (comedian) =

Australia-based English comedian

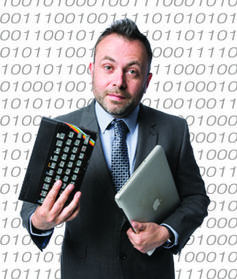
- Dan Willis (Comedian) in a publicity shot for the comedy show "Control Alt Delete: The Funny Side Of Computers".
- Born: Dan Hull; 11 March 1973 (age 53); York, England

Comedy career
- Medium: Comedian, actor, Computer Programmer, presenter
- Genres: Comedy, Information Technology
- Website: danwillis.net

Dan Willis (born Dan Hull; 11 March 1973) is an Australia-based English comedian, originally studying and then working in information technology for over 12 years before moving into live stand-up comedy after the IT crash of 2002. Since then, Willis has performed over 2,000 times at comedy venues and festivals throughout the world, as well as live stand-up. He also performs 2 specialist computer comedy shows "Control-Alt-Delete" and "PC Mac and me".

== Early life ==
Willis was born Dan Hull in York in 1973, he took the stage name "Dan Willis" as a homage to the show Diff'rent Strokes. At the age of 3 his parents divorced and he moved to Newcastle Upon Tyne where he attended St Catherines First School, Gosforth Central Middle and Gosforth High School. Willis then studied at Liverpool University where he gained degrees in Computer Sciences and American History.

== Information technology career ==
Gaining an initial love of computers after being bought a ZX Spectrum 48k at the age of 9, Willis chose to study Computer Sciences as part of his degree at Liverpool University. After graduating he first worked as a computer support technician at the head office of Meyer cookware in Liverpool. He then switched to computer programming for FI group, Eagle Star Insurance, Unisys, Coutts & Co and Alchemy Data Migration.

Initially starting as a Visual Basic programmer, he quickly retrained in COBOL, PL1, Easytrieve and DB2 to work on Y2K projects. After Y2K he retrained in ETL tools ACTA, Informatica and Ab Initio, working for 2 years at Alchemy Data Migration prior to the IT crash of 2002.

== Comedy career ==
Whilst still a programmer Willis won the Time Out Comedy Awards to be a punters representative on the Perrier Panel. Watching over 80 shows at the 2001 Edinburgh Festival inspired him to become a comedian.

Starting out in 2002, Willis made his Edinburgh Debut with The Amused Moose Hot Starlets (in a line up with Nina Conti, Greg Davies, Rhod Gilbert and Patrick Monahan). From there he has now performed at over 90 international comedy festivals, specializing in solo shows about specific subject matters.

== Specialized solo shows ==
=== Information technology (computer) comedy shows ===
"Control-Alt-Delete: The Funny Side Of Computers". Performed at Melbourne Comedy Festival, Edinburgh Festival, Adelaide Fringe, Melbourne Fringe and Perth Fringe World.

"PC MAC and Me" has been performed at the Edinburgh Festival and was also featured on BBC Click on 7 September 2013, with Dan discussing iPhones, Mac Books, PC's, ZX Spectrum's, Commodore 64's and the humour inherent within them.

As well as performing on the international stand-up circuit, Willis also performs specialized shows at corporate events. His shows "PC Mac and Me" and "Control Alt Delete" have been performed for companies such as Hewlett Packard and Microsoft.

=== Ferris Bueller's Way Of... ===
Ferris Bueller's Day Off Love the movie, live the life. Dan Willis looks for life answers in a 1986 feel good movie. Performed at Edinburgh Festival, Adelaide Fringe, Melbourne Fringe, New Zealand Comedy Festival and Melbourne Comedy Festival

=== The Walking Dead ===
The Beginners Guide To Surviving a Zombie Apocalypse. Based on The Walking Dead TV series. Performed at Melbourne Comedy Festival, Edinburgh Festival, Adelaide Fringe, New Zealand Comedy Festival, Melbourne Fringe and Perth Fringe World.

=== Radiohead ===
A comedic journey into feel-good music. Performed at Leicester Comedy Festival, Edinburgh Festival, Melbourne Comedy Festival and Adelaide Fringe.

=== Australia: A Whinging Poms Guide ===
The funny side of Australia. "Dan Willis moved to Australia six years ago. Now he’s got a bag of jokes, experiences and hangovers to share". Performed at Adelaide Fringe.

=== Comedy world record holder ===
In August 2012, Willis became the first comedian in history to perform six shows a day at the Edinburgh Festival, each show being an hour long and performed without repeating material.
