= Cape 31 =

2025 one-design racing keelboat

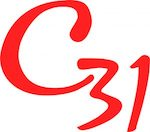

Development
- Designer: Mark Mills
- Location: South Africa
- Year: 2017
- No. built: 83 (October 2026)
- Builder: Cape Performance Sailing
- Role: One design racer

Boat
- Displacement: 3,902.18 lb (1,770 kg)
- Draft: 8.04 ft (2.45 m)

Hull
- Type: monohull
- Construction: glassfibre
- LOA: 31.36 ft (9.56 m)
- LWL: 28.97 ft (8.83 m)
- Beam: 10.17 ft (3.10 m)
- Engine: Yanmar 2YM 15 hp (11 kW) diesel engine with saildrive

Hull appendages
- Keel: Bulb keel
- Ballast: 1,565.28 lb (710 kg)
- Rudder: Spade-type rudder

Rig
- Rig type: Bermuda rig
- I foretriangle height: 40.88 ft (12.46 m)
- J foretriangle base: 11.81 ft (3.60 m)
- P mainsail luff: 41.01 ft (12.50 m)
- E mainsail foot: 14.27 ft (4.35 m)

Sails
- Sailplan: Fractional rigged sloop
- Mainsail area: 292.61 sq ft (27.184 m^{2})
- Jib/genoa area: 241.40 sq ft (22.427 m^{2})
- Total sail area: 534.01 sq ft (49.611 m^{2})

Rating
- Rating: 1.135 (IRC)

The Cape 31 is a South African planing sailboat that was designed by Mark Mills as a one design racer and first built in 2017.

== Production ==
The design has been built by Cape Performance Sailing in South Africa, since 2017. A total of 80 boats had been completed by January 2025. As of 2025 it remains in production.

== Design ==
The boat was conceived by Irvine Laidlaw, Baron Laidlaw as a "highly technical" boat to boost the Cape Town, South Africa yachting community. The boat was intended for production there and was designed to entice young sailors to get into keelboat sailing.

The Cape 31 is a racing keelboat, built predominantly of glassfibre and carbon fibre. The hull is made from vacuum-bagged E-glass with a core of cellular foam. The design has a fractional sloop rig with a square-topped mainsail, a bowsprit, two sets of swept spreaders, a carbon fibre two-piece mast and aluminum boom, with steel rod standing rigging. The hull has a plumb stem and transom, an internally mounted spade-type rudder controlled by a carbon tiller and a fixed carbon fibre fin keel with a weighted lead bulb. It displaces 3,902.18 lb (1,770 kg) and carries 1,565.28 lb (710 kg) of ballast.

The engineering was completed by Steve Koopman of composite engineering company SDK, with sails designed and made by North Sails, South Africa.

The boat has a draft of 8.04 ft (2.45 m) with the standard keel and is fitted with a Japanese Yanmar 2YM diesel engine of 15 hp (11 kW) with a saildrive for docking and manoeuvring.

For sailing downwind the design may be equipped with a large gennaker, flown from the bowsprit. The design has a hull speed of 7.21 kn (13.35 km/h), although it will plane at speeds in excess of 25 kn (46 km/h).

One of the design constraints was that it was made to fit inside a standard high-cube container for global transport.

The boat's class rules specify that it is helmed by the owner, with a minimum crew of five sailors, with a combined weight of 1,124 lb (510 kg) minimum to 1,311 lb (595 kg) maximum. No more than three of the crew may be professional sailors. Boats are often sailed with a crew of seven or eight.

== Operational history ==
The boat is supported by an active class club that organizes racing events, the Cape 31 International Class Association.

The first ten boats were all located in South Africa and attracted teams from other parts of the world to come and try them out.

By April 2023 there were racing fleets in South Africa and Europe, with moves underway to establish it in North America as well. It was first raced in the United States at the Southernmost Regatta in Key West, Florida in January 2023, where Lucas Masiello of Yachting World reports that "the class stole the show."

Cape 31 owner Sandra Askew stated, "They're technical boats—not hard to sail—but you do need to know what you're doing. They definitely get up and go, so it's good to have people on board that know what they're doing. It's challenging but just really, really fun. Fast and easy to manage downwind, and it goes upwind nicely."

Veteran ocean racer Dave Swete said of the design, "you can get this boat straight out of the box and go and win races. The Cape 31 won overall in Les Voiles de St Tropez last year, as well as a whole host of local events in the Solent ... We can take this boat out in 25 knots wind against tide in the Solent and have a really nice day, then come back in and the boat's in one piece, it's not full of water. We haven't been broaching out and nosediving all day, we've just been bow-up, doing 20 knots downwind and 7.5 knots upwind. It's fair to say it's a proper yacht."
