= Hannah Thompson =

British scholar

Hannah Jane Thompson (born 1973) is a British academic and professor of French and critical disability studies at Royal Holloway, University of London. Her research focuses primarily on 19th and 20th century French literature, especially the novel.

== Education ==
Thompson attended Gosforth High School (1986-1991) and studied Modern and Medieval Languages at Newnham College, Cambridge before completing an MPhil and a PhD in nineteenth-century French literature at the University of Cambridge. She was Adrian Research Fellow at Darwin College, Cambridge (2000-2003).

== Career ==
Thompson has worked at Royal Holloway, University of London since 2003.

She is interested in how markers of identity such as gender, sexuality and disability are represented in French realist and naturalist texts. Her first book Naturalism Redressed (2004) explores the relationship between costume and identity construction in the Rougon-Macquart novels by Emile Zola. Thompson argues that Zola's metaphors of clothing operate as a subversive network of references to fabric and flesh which undermines Zola's Naturalist project. According to Laurey Martin-Berg, "Thompson's 'use of clothing to illustrate how far Naturalism's chief spokesman strayed from his literary theories breaks new ground, and her well-documented and convincing analyses make an important contribution to the ongoing demystification of Zola as a "Naturalist" novelist as well as to a critical re-examination of the implications of Naturalism in and for the novel."

Her second book, Taboo: Corporeal Secrets in Nineteenth-Century France (2013), extends her scope to include works by George Sand, Rachilde, Octave Mirbeau, Jules Barbey d'Aurevilly, Guy de Maupassant and Victor Hugo, as well as Emile Zola's late novels. A review in the Forum for Modern Language Studies explains the book's premise: "In spite of their frank depictions of the human form, Realist and Naturalist writers held clear anxieties with regard to certain prohibited and illicit subjects that complicated the supposed transparency of their work. From unruly erotic desire and sexual violence to bodily breakdown and masculine weakness, taboo bodies, however, served a key purpose by further energizing the tension in the Realist enterprise between what could and what could not be represented." Thompson's analysis combines insights from leading nineteenth-century French scholars including Henri Mitterand, Peter Brooks, Naomi Schor and Emily Apter with work by French and Anglo-American theorists such as Roland Barthes, Michel Foucault, Cathy Caruth, Georges Bataille and Judith Butler to argue that French novelists use references to the ill, damaged or deformed body to stand in for a series of even more unspeakable bodily taboos. According to Tammy Berberi, "Thompson's study places itself squarely within studies of the body while also relying upon the tenets of newer arenas of inquiry such as disability studies."

In her third book, Reviewing Blindness in French Fiction (2017), Thompson expands the disability studies work began in Taboo by using the work of disability studies scholars, including Rosemarie Garland-Thomson, Cathy Kudlick and Zina Weygand, to argue that the most interesting depictions of blindness in French literature are those which do not subscribe to the "metanarrative of blindness" theorized by British academic David Bolt. According to Sherri Rose, '"the pun in the title, Reviewing Blindness, serves both as an invitation to the reader to rethink the origins of myths linked to blindness, and as a playful critique intended to draw awareness to the prevalence of ocularcentric rhetorical devices, such as visual metaphors (re-viewing), embedded in language. Through close readings of novels by writers including Honoré de Balzac, Lucien Descaves, Jean Giono and Hervé Guibert, Thompson argues that literary accounts of blindness can lead to a rich, multi-sensory experience which dismantles the hierarchy of the senses found in Western culture and celebrates the positive effects of blindness on both blind and non-blind readers and writers.

Her most recent work is on the value of audio description for both blind and non-blind audiences.

== Selected works ==
=== Books ===
- Naturalism Redressed: Identity and Clothing in the Novels of Emile Zola (2004)
- Taboo: Corporeal Secrets in Nineteenth-Century France (2013)
- Reviewing Blindness in French Fiction 1789-2013 (2017)

=== Edited volumes ===
- Blindness Arts (co-edited with Vanessa Warne), Disability Studies Quarterly (2018).
- 'Cécités et Créations' (co-edited with Maria Fernanda Arentsen), Canadian Journal of Disability Studies 8.6 (2019)

=== Scholarly articles ===
- Thompson, Hannah (1 September 1998). "'Une Perversion Du Désir, Une Névrose Nouvelle': Female Sexuality in Zola's Au Bonheur des Dames". Romance Studies. 16 (2): 81–92. doi:10.1179/026399098786543812. ISSN 0263-9904.
- Thompson, Hannah (2001). "Berthe's "dessous douteux": the Body Stripped in Pot-Bouille". Australian Journal of French Studies. 38 (3): 336–348. doi:10.3828/ajfs.38.3.336. ISSN 0004-9468.
- Thompson, Hannah (2003). "Rewriting the Perverse: Rachilde and the Erotic Body". Nottingham French Studies. 42 (2): 26–34. doi:10.3366/nfs.2003-2.003. ISSN 0029-4586.
- Thompson, Hannah (2003). "Ornamental Desires: The Scandal of the 'Détail Inutile' in Émile Zola's Le Docteur Pascal". Romance Studies. 21 (2): 91–99. doi:10.1179/026399003786543168. ISSN 0263-9904.
- Thompson, Hannah (2010). "Savage Poetry: Torture and Cruelty in Mirbeau and Barbey d'Aurevilly". French Studies. 64 (4): 410–422. doi:10.1093/fs/knq106. ISSN 0016-1128. PMID 21114062. S2CID 21888275.
- Thompson, Hannah (2013). "Dirt, Disintegration, and Disappointment: Sex and the City of Paris". Dix-Neuf. 17 (2): 183–196. doi:10.1179/1478731813z.00000000033. ISSN 1478-7318. S2CID 191455699.
- Thompson, Hannah (2016). ""De simple malade j'étais devenu un handicapé": Interrogating the Construction of 'Disability' in Jean-Dominique Bauby's Le scaphandre et le papillon". L'Esprit Créateur. 56 (2): 79–92. doi:10.1353/esp.2016.0015. ISSN 1931-0234. S2CID 163725417.
- Thompson, Hannah (2017). "French and Francophone Disability Studies". French Studies. 71 (2): 243–251. doi:10.1093/fs/knx019. ISSN 0016-1128. S2CID 164774039.
