= Ben Price =

British actor (born 1971)

- Born: 30 June 1971 (age 55); Newcastle upon Tyne, England
- Education: Royal Central School of Speech and Drama
- Occupation: Actor
- Years active: 1993–present
- Spouse: Alexandra Wheeler (m. 2005)
- Children: 2

Ben Price (born 30 June 1971) is an English actor. He has played the role of Nick Tilsley in the ITV soap opera Coronation Street since 2009 and has made four films as a writer/director, the first of which, I'm Sorry To Tell You, was BAFTA-shortlisted.

== Early life ==
Price grew up in Newcastle upon Tyne, where he attended Gosforth East Middle School and Gosforth High School before taking acting classes at the Live Theatre. He then attended London's Drama Centre and graduated from the Central School of Speech and Drama in 1996.

== Career ==
Price started his career at the Manchester Royal Exchange, and went on to appear at the Bush in London, the Gate in Dublin and Sheffield Crucible among others. He made his first appearance on television, in a 1996 episode of Casualty, before guest roles in Soldier Soldier, Heartbeat, Peak Practice, and an episode of the Australian soap opera, Home and Away, in 1998, when the show filmed a storyline in the United Kingdom.

After starring in Wire in the Blood, he played Conrad Gates, captain of Earl's Park football team and England, in the British television series Footballers' Wives. After leaving the show at the end of the fourth series, he went on to appear in Dancing at Lughnassa at the Gate theatre, Dublin.

He co-stars in the horror film Blood Trails, which won the audience award for best feature at the Dead by Dawn International Horror Film Festival 2006 in Edinburgh.

He returned to Casualty and starred as corporate director Nathan Spencer between 2005 and 2007, and was recently voted one of the ten actors most likely to succeed in Hollywood by Stage and Screen magazine. Price appeared on the July 2006 cover of Out magazine.

In 2009 he appeared in the third season of showtimes hit show The Tudors, playing the martyr John Lambert.

Price joined Coronation Street as Nick Tilsley in 2009. He began filming on 19 October 2009 and was seen on screen for the first time on 21 December 2009.

Ben's first 4 films have played at over 60 International Film festivals, 25 of which were BAFTA- or Academy-qualifying. His first short, "I'm Sorry To Tell You", was shortlisted at BAFTA and is distributed worldwide by Shorts International. His second film, "Taubman", was shown at the Oscar-qualifying Athens Film Festival, opened the Manchester film festival and was shown as part of a special section at the BAFTA qualifying Jewish Film Festival. His latest film, “Hope Dies Last”, is part of the British Film Council short support scheme. BAFTA- and Oscar-qualified, it is currently touring the international festival circuit. In 2020 he filmed "3 Minutes of Silence" funded by the BFI and starring Bella Ramsey and Molly Wright. It's gone onto International recognition and has formed the basis for a Feature Film funded by the BFI.

On 27 January 2017 it was announced he would be leaving the role of Nick Tilsley in Coronation Street later in 2017. On 23 April 2018 it was announced Price would be returning to Coronation Street in summer 2018 and would appear on screen from autumn 2018 following a year away from the role.

Price has a podcast called On the Sofa with Colson, Jack and Ben with Coronation Street co-stars Jack P. Shepherd and Colson Smith.

== Personal life ==
Price married Alexandra Wheeler in 2005. They have two children together. He is a fan of Newcastle United.

=== Films ===
Year	Film	Role	Notes
2002	Flyfishing	James	
2006	Blood Trails	Chris	
2015	I'm Sorry To Tell You	Director/Writer	Finalist for Best Short Film at One Shot Movie Festival
2016	Taubman	Director/Writer	
2017	Hope Dies Last	Director/Writer	Won Best Period Piece at HollyShorts Film Festival Nominated for Best Short Film at Manhattan Short Film Festival Nominated for Best Short Film at Cambridge Film Festival
2020	3 Minutes of Silence	Director/Writer	Supported by the BFI

=== Television ===
Year	Show	Role	Notes
1996	Casualty	Jimmy Sellars	Episode: "Flesh and Blood"
1997	Soldier Soldier	Fus Chris Howden	Episode: "The Road to Damascus"
1997	Underworld	Runner	Episode No. 1.4
1998	Supply & Demand	Jonathon	
1998	Home and Away	Geoffrey Burns	Series 11, Episode 56 (Episode No. 2351)
1998	Heartbeat	John Fraser	Episode: "Where There's a Will"
1999	Peak Practice	Tom Wise	Episode: "Fighting Chance"
1999	Hope & Glory	Mr. Jakes	Episodes No. 1.1 and No. 1.2
1999	Bugs	Wymark	Episodes: "Money Spiders" and "The Enemy Within"
2000	Badger	Dion	Episodes: "The Price of a Daughter" and "Cock o' the Walk"
2001	Table 12	David	Episode: "Guess Who's Not Coming to Dinner"
2002	Wire in the Blood	Michael Jordan	Episode: "The Mermaids Singing"
2004–2005	Footballers' Wives	Conrad Gates	Series regular
2005	The Bill	Greg Webster	Episode No. 343
2005–2007	Casualty	Nathan Spencer	Series regular
2009	The Tudors	John Lambert	Season 3 Episode 6 : "Search for a New Queen"
2009–2017, 2018–	Coronation Street	Nick Tilsley	Series regular, 1,000+ episodes
2013	Driven to Extremes	Narrator	

=== Stage ===
Year	Title	Role	Notes
1996	All's Well That Ends Well	Matthew Lloyd	Manchester Royal Exchange
1997	Shoe Shop of Desire	James Christopher	Critics up for review, BAC
1998	Entertaining Mr Sloane	Richard Beecham	Bolton Octagon
1999	Svejk	Dhalia Ibelhauptatie	The Gate Theatre
1999	The Backroom	Jonathon Lloyd	The Bush
2001	On the Razzle	Peter Wood	Chichester Festival Theatre
2003	Iphegenia	Anna Mackmin	Sheffield Crucible
2010	Dancing at Lughnasa	Joe Dowling	The Gate Dublin

== Awards and nominations ==
Year	Award	Category	Work	Result	Ref.
2006	12th National Television Awards	Most Popular Newcomer	Casualty	Nominated	
2010	The British Soap Awards	Sexiest Male	Coronation Street	Nominated	
2010	TV Choice Awards	Best Soap Newcomer	Coronation Street	Shortlisted	
2011	All About Soap Bubble Awards	Best Love Triangle (shared with Jane Danson and Chris Gascoyne)	Coronation Street	Nominated	
2013	Inside Soap Awards	Best Actor	Coronation Street	Nominated	
2014	19th National Television Awards	Serial Drama Performance	Coronation Street	Nominated	
2014	The British Soap Awards	Best Actor	Coronation Street	Nominated	
2015	TV Choice Awards	Best Soap Actor	Coronation Street	Nominated	
2016	21st National Television Awards	Serial Drama Performance	Coronation Street	Nominated	
2016	The British Soap Awards	Best Actor	Coronation Street	Nominated	
2016	Inside Soap Awards	Best Actor	Coronation Street	Nominated	
2017	22nd National Television Awards	Serial Drama Performance	Coronation Street	Nominated	
2017	Inside Soap Awards	Best Exit	Coronation Street	Nominated	
2019	Inside Soap Awards	Best Bad Boy	Coronation Street	Nominated	
2021	Inside Soap Awards	Best Partnership (shared with Danson)	Coronation Street	Nominated	
