= Robert Sherlaw Johnson =

British composer, pianist and music scholar (1932 - 2000)

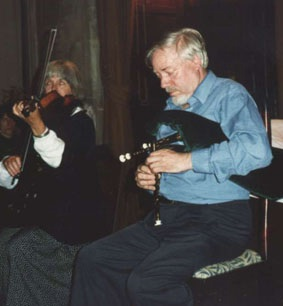
Robert Sherlaw Johnson playing the Northumbrian smallpipes

Robert Sherlaw Johnson (21 May 1932 – 3 November 2000), was a British composer, pianist and music scholar. Sherlaw Johnson was one of that group of post-war British musicians whose work reflected wider European interests in new ideas, techniques and aesthetics. While his work and influence were wide-ranging, he is particularly noted for his advocacy and performance of the music of Olivier Messiaen.

== Biography ==
Sherlaw Johnson was born in Sunderland. He was educated at Gosforth Grammar School in Newcastle-upon-Tyne, at King's College, Durham, and at the Royal Academy of Music, London, where he was the recipient of a Charles Black award. He used this to travel to Paris, where he studied piano with Jacques Février and composition with Nadia Boulanger, and attended Olivier Messiaen's classes at the Conservatoire de Paris. In 1971 he was awarded the degree of DMus by the University of Leeds for a doctoral thesis on Messiaen's use of birdsong and in 1984 was elected to a Fellowship of the Royal Academy of Music. He also received a DMus from Oxford in 1990 in recognition of his work as a composer.

Sherlaw Johnson taught at the University of Leeds (1961–3), Bradford Girls' Grammar School (1963–5), the University of York (1965–70) and Oxford University (1970–1999), where he succeeded Kenneth Leighton as music Fellow at Worcester College. In 1985 he was visiting professor of composition at the Eastman School of Music, University of Rochester. Notable pupils include Stephen Oliver, Charles Bodman Rae, Caroline Rae, Rachel Portman and Robert Saxton (who succeeded Sherlaw Johnson at Worcester College).

Sherlaw Johnson was to the last an enthusiastic campanologist. He died while ringing bells at the historic tower of Appleton, south-west of Oxford.

He married the painter Rachael Clarke in 1959. They had two daughters and three sons, one of whom, Austin, is married to the television writer, producer, and director Sally Wainwright.

== Influences and interests ==
Sherlaw Johnson's time in Paris exerted its mark on his professional development. He came to be known for his performances and recordings of Messiaen's piano and (as accompanist) vocal music. The insight this gave him is evident in his monograph on the composer, which remains a standard English-language text on its subject. Some of his own earlier compositions show the influence of Messiaen, Varèse and Boulez. His work subsequently moved in a more individual direction, but his continuing sympathy with the European musical avant garde is evident in his interest in serialism, fractal music and extended performance techniques. These interests can be seen in works such as Green Whispers of Gold and Praise of Heaven & Earth, for voice, piano and tape. He also wrote and lectured on mathematics and music, and founded the Electronic music Studio at Oxford University.

Religion was another significant influence on Sherlaw Johnson's work. A convert to Roman Catholicism, he wrote a number of functional liturgical works. Several of these were for Spode Music Week, an annual Catholic music course which he directed for many years.

The continuing influence of Sherlaw Johnson's geographical origins is evident in compositions, such as the Northumbrian Symphony and his opera, The Lambton Worm, that utilise material from the North-East of England. He also gained much personal satisfaction from playing the Northumbrian pipes.

Sherlaw Johnson's interest in bells and bell-inspired music (he rang regularly at his local church at Stonesfield) is also evident in some of his own compositions.

== Sources and external links ==
- "Obituary". Times. Archived from the original on 5 June 2011.
- "Obituary: Robert Sherlaw-Johnson". the Guardian. 16 November 2000.
- "The Musical Times: Robert Sherlaw Johnson 1932-2000". Archived from the original on 15 September 2005.
