= Parklands and North Gosforth =

Coordinates: 55.034°N 1.630°W

- Ward
- Parklands and North Gosforth highlighted within Newcastle upon Tyne
- OS grid reference: NZ237711
  - London: 251 miles (404 km)
- Metropolitan borough: Newcastle upon Tyne
- Metropolitan county: Tyne and Wear
- Region: North East
- Country: England
- Sovereign state: United Kingdom
- Post town: NEWCASTLE UPON TYNE
- Postcode district: NE3
- Dialling code: 0191
- Police: Northumbria
- Fire: Tyne and Wear
- Ambulance: North East
- UK Parliament: Newcastle upon Tyne North
- Councillors: Pauline Allen (Liberal Democrats); Christine Morrissey (Liberal Democrats); David Partington (Liberal Democrats)

Parklands and North Gosforth is an electoral ward of Newcastle upon Tyne in North East England. It encompasses the northern edge of the suburb of Gosforth, north of the Metro line and bisected north–south by the Great North Road to the northern boundary of the City of Newcastle, bounded to the west by the A1 road and to the east by the A189.

It possesses large areas of green space, including Gosforth Park Race Course, Gosforth Wood and Gosforth Lake, plus a number of golf courses. Melton Park contains the remains of a medieval chapel which is a scheduled ancient monument.

== Component parts ==
Parklands and North Gosforth is represented by three councillors on Newcastle City Council.

For electoral purposes, following boundary changes in 2018, the incorporation of Garden Village and fields to the north on which North Gosforth Park housing is being built, Parklands Ward is divided into 6 polling districts

- UO1 – Grange Estate/Park
- UO2 – Brunton Park, North Brunton and Great Park east of A1 (Melbury and Warkworth Woods)
- UO3 – North Gosforth Park
- UO4 – Melton Park north to Sandy Lane and east to Salters Lane
- UO5 – Whitebridge Park and Halls Estate
- UO6 – Garden Village

The electorate grew from 8,639 (2019) to 8,848 (2020)

== Education ==
There are five schools within the Parklands and North Gosforth ward:

- Grange First School
- Gosforth East Middle School
- Gosforth Park First School
- Gosforth Academy, formerly Gosforth High School
- St Oswald's Primary School

== Other facilities ==
- Gosforth Nature Reserve
- Gosforth Park
- Gosforth Golf Club
- City of Newcastle Golf Club
- Parklands Golf Club
- Newcastle Racecourse
- Northumberland Golf Club
- Northern RUFC
- Gosforth Sports Association (rugby, cricket, baseball, Australian Rules)
- Red House Farm Juniors Football Club
- Benson Park (tennis, Bohemians football)
- St Aidan's Church
- Allotments (inc Three Mile, Woodlea Gardens)
- Local shopping at Brunton Park, Melton Park and Grange (Great North Road)
- Doctors' surgeries (Brunton Park, Great North Road)
