= Sunday Times Rich List 2012 =

Annually published UK list

The Sunday Times Rich List 2012 is the 24th annual survey of the wealthiest people in the United Kingdom, published by The Sunday Times on 29 April 2012.

== Top 17 fortunes ==
2012		Name	Citizenship	Source of wealth	2011	
Rank	Net worth £ bn	Name	Citizenship	Source of wealth	Rank	Net worth £ bn
1	£12.70 ▼	Lakshmi Mittal and family	India	Steel	1	£17.50
2	£12.31 ▼	Alisher Usmanov	Russia	Mining and Investment	2	£12.40
3	£9.50 ▲	Roman Abramovich	Russia	Oil and industry	3	£7.40
4 ▲	£8.60 ▲	Sri and Gopi Hinduja	India	Industry and Finance	9	£6.00
5 ▲	£7.58 ▲	Leonard Blavatnik	United States	Industry	6	£6.24
6 ▼	£7.40 ▲	Ernesto and Kirsty Bertarelli	Switzerland & United Kingdom	Pharmaceuticals	5	£6.87
7 ▼	£7.35 ▲	The Duke of Westminster	United Kingdom	Inheritance, Property	4	£7.00
8	£7.08 ▲	David and Simon Reuben	United Kingdom	Property and internet	8	£6.18
9 ▼	£6.60 ▲	John Fredriksen and family	Cyprus	Shipping and oil services	7	£6.20
10 ▼	£5.90 ▼	Galen Weston, George Weston and family	Canada	Retailing (George Weston Limited)	9	£6.00
11	£5.49 ▲	Charlene de Carvalho-Heineken and Michel Carvalho	Netherlands	Inheritance, banking, brewing (Heineken)	11	£5.40
12 ▲	£4.30	Hans Rausing and family	Sweden	Packaging	13	£4.20
13	£4.10	Joseph Lau	China	Property		
14	£4.30	Nicky Oppenheimer	South Africa	Mining, diamonds		
15	£3.90	Kirsten & Jörn Rausing	Sweden	Inheritance, investment		
16	£3.40	Sir Richard Branson	United Kingdom	Internet, transport, finance (Virgin Group)		
17	£3.30	Sir Philip and Lady Green	United Kingdom	Retailing		

== See also ==
- Forbes list of billionaires
