= Excelsior Academy =

School in Newcastle-on-Tyne, United Kingdom

Excelsior Academy Newcastle
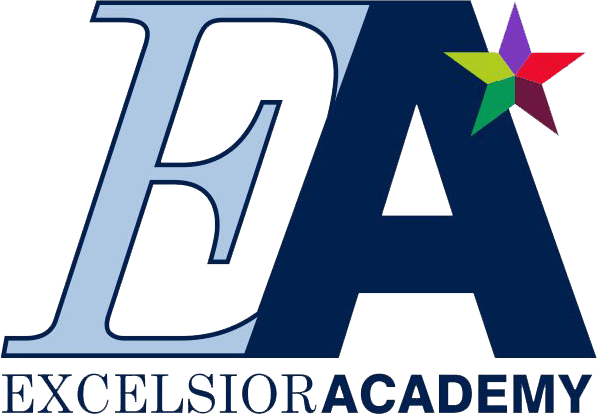

Location
- Denton Road; Newcastle Upon Tyne, Tyne and Wear, NE15 6AF; United Kingdom; 54.97487°N 1.69021°W

Information
- Type: Academy
- Motto: Think Differently
- Religious affiliation: None
- Established: 1 September 2008
- Closed: Saturday and Sunday
- Local authority: Newcastle
- Department for Education URN: 135423 Tables
- Ofsted: Reports
- Head Teacher: Mark Foster
- Gender: Mixed
- Age: 3 to 19
- Colours: Grey (main colour); Blue (logo); Dark Green (Hadrian); Burgundy (Milburn); Purple (Collingwood); Light Green (College)
- Website: excelsioracademy.laidlawschoolstrust.com

Excelsior Academy is a mixed all-through school and sixth form. It was opened in September 2008 as a replacement for the Westgate Community College and is situated in the west end of Newcastle upon Tyne, United Kingdom.

The academy was originally for secondary school pupils aged 11 to 18 including a sixth form. It had four sections to the school, which were Jefferson, Milburn, Hadrian and Armstrong.

In mid-2013, Armstrong and Jefferson merged into one large school named Collingwood. In 2012 it was announced that the school would create a primary school called Rainbird, and have an age range of 3 to 19.

The three main secondary schools are based on their own specialist subjects individually:

Schools	Date	Specialism	Headteacher(s)
Milburn	2008–Present	Health and Fitness	Claire Goodwill (2018–Present) David Hughes (2008 - 2018)
Hadrian	2008–Present	Environment and Technology	Kirsty Ruffle (2016–Present) Craig Taylor (2008 - 2016)
Collingwood	2013–Present	Art and Creativity	Michael Connolly (2013–Present)
Rainbird	2013–Present	N/A	Charlotte De Oliveira (2013–2023)
College	2012–Present	N/A	Sara Massingham (2018–Present) Deon Krishnan (Acting, 2018) Claire Goodwill (2015 - 2018) Martin Farrar (Former) Lynn Aitchison (Former)
Former Schools	Date	Specialism	Headteacher(s)
Jefferson	2008 - 2013	Dance and Performing Arts	Michael Connolly (2008 - 2013)
Armstrong	2008 - 2013	Business and Enterprise	Lynn Aitchison (2008 - 2013)

The school is currently part of the Laidlaw Schools Trust and is sponsored by Lord Laidlaw.

The academy has also been listed in the 200 most improved schools nationally identified by the Department for Education.

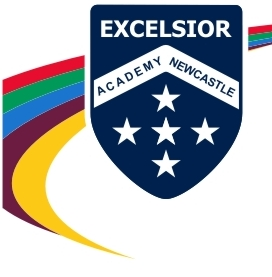
Logo from 2008-2015

== Notable people ==
- Irvine Laidlaw, Baron Laidlaw – founder and sponsor

== Alumni ==
- Michael Hoganson - professional footballer for Newcastle United and Derby County.
- Kema Sikazwe - Actor in I, Daniel Blake
