= List of shipwrecks in February 1923 =

The list of shipwrecks in February 1923 includes ships sunk, foundered, grounded, or otherwise lost during February 1923.

== 1 February ==
List of shipwrecks: 1 February 1923
Ship	State	Description
Poseidon	Germany	The cargo ship ran aground in the Paraná River, Argentina. She was refloated on 4 February.

== 2 February ==
List of shipwrecks: 2 February 1923
Ship	State	Description
Alroy	United Kingdom	The auxiliary sailing vessel came ashore at Camber Sands, Sussex and was wrecked. Her crew were rescued by the Rye Lifeboat.
Garouda	France	The cargo ship was wrecked at Pulo Bintang, Netherlands East Indies. Her crew were rescued.
Marguerite Ryan	United Kingdom	The schooner was abandoned in the Atlantic Ocean. Her crew were rescued by Corinthic (United Kingdom).
No. 2	United Kingdom	The bucket dredger capsized and sank in the River Humber at Hull, Yorkshire with the loss of six of her eight crew.

== 3 February ==
List of shipwrecks: 3 February 1923
Ship	State	Description
Arfeld	Germany	The cargo ship collided with Lacuna (United Kingdom) in the Mississippi River at New Orleans, Louisiana, United States and was beached.

== 5 February ==
List of shipwrecks: 5 February 1923
Ship	State	Description
Padova	Italy	The cargo ship ran aground at Fordeiro, A Coruña, Spain. Her crew were rescued. She was a total loss.

== 6 February ==
List of shipwrecks: 6 February 1923
Ship	State	Description
Tamara 12	Germany	The sailing ship departed Leith, Lothian, United Kingdom for Hamburg. Presumed later foundered in the North Sea with the loss of all hands. A lifeboat with the body of a crew member washed up at Start Point, Sanday, Orkney Islands on 20 February.

== 7 February ==
List of shipwrecks: 7 February 1923
Ship	State	Description
Frank M. Deering	United States	The schooner came ashore on Cobb Island, Maryland and was wrecked.
Goodwin	United Kingdom	The cargo ship collided with Maid of Orleans (United Kingdom) in the North Sea off the Girdler Lightship (United Kingdom). She was beached on the West Girdler Sands off Herne Bay, Kent. She was refloated on 12 February and towed to Greenhithe, Kent.
Slievenamon	Ireland	The coaster came ashore in Ballycotton Bay. She was refloated on 12 February.
Centaurus	Denmark	The barquentine sailed from Harbour Buffett, Newfoundland for Málaga, Spain. No further trace, presumed foundered in the Atlantic Ocean with the loss of all hands.

== 8 February ==
List of shipwrecks: 8 February 1923
Ship	State	Description
Figueira	Portugal	The cargo ship was driven ashore at Leixões and was wrecked. She was refloated in early June.
Rhona	Portugal	The tug ran aground at Lisbon and sank with the loss of five of her seven crew.

== 9 February ==
List of shipwrecks: 9 February 1923
Ship	State	Description
Adolf Vinnen	Germany	Adolf Vinnen wrecked off Cornwall on her maiden voyage The five-masted barquentine was driven onto rocks at Bass Point, Cornwall, United Kingdom on her maiden voyage. All 24 crew were saved by means of rocket apparatus from the cliffs.
Romanitza	France	The cargo ship ran aground at Bessaker, Norway. She was refloated on 16 February.

== 10 February ==
List of shipwrecks: 10 February 1923
Ship	State	Description
Sarah Latham	United Kingdom	The auxiliary schooner was abandoned in the Atlantic Ocean. Her crew were rescued by Olympia (United Kingdom), which towed Sarah Latham to Liverpool, Lancashire.
Scotia Maiden	Canada	The auxiliary sailing vessel caught fire and was abandoned in the Mediterranean Sea (40°00′N 1°15′E). All crew were rescued by Fenchurch (United Kingdom).

== 13 February ==
List of shipwrecks: 13 February 1923
Ship	State	Description
Esperanza	Spain	The four-masted schooner ran aground on the Luna Shoals off the coast of the Dominican Republic and was a total loss.

== 14 February ==
List of shipwrecks: 14 February 1923
Ship	State	Description
Good Partner	United States	The 13-gross register ton motor vessel was lost at Metlakatla, Territory of Alaska, when the dolphin she was moored to collapsed while no one was on board.
Lukkos	Netherlands	The cargo ship passed Dungeness, Kent, United Kingdom bound for a port in Spanish Morocco. Presumed foundered in the English Channel with the loss of all hands. Wreckage washed up at Bexhill-on-Sea and Beachy Head, Sussex on 20 February.
Regina	United Kingdom	The tug struck a submerged object and sank in the River Thames at Rainham, Essex. She was refloated on 18 February.

== 15 February ==
List of shipwrecks: 15 February 1923
Ship	State	Description
Moncenisio	Italy	The cargo ship foundered in the Atlantic Ocean (36°35′N 65°22′W) with the loss of all hands.
Tuscan Prince	United Kingdom	The cargo ship was wrecked on the coast of Washington, United States.

== 16 February ==
List of shipwrecks: 16 February 1923
Ship	State	Description
Dorin	United Kingdom	The auxiliary sailing vessel was abandoned in the Atlantic Ocean (39°54′N 73°30′W). She was set afire by her crew, who were rescued by Vasari (United Kingdom). Dorin was towed into New York by USCGC Seneca (United States Coast Guard), arriving on 19 February.
Giulio Cesare	Italy	The cargo ship struck a rock and foundered off Cape Trafalgar, Spain. Her crew were rescued.
Sagua	United States	The cargo ship caught fire and sank at Hoboken, New Jersey.
Wasa	Finland	The cargo ship was sunk by ice in the Gulf of Finland off the Kallbadan Lighthouse. Her crew were rescued.
West Hematite	United States	The Design 1013 cargo ship ran aground in the Weser, Germany.

== 17 February ==
List of shipwrecks: 17 February 1923
Ship	State	Description
Dotterel	United Kingdom	The coaster ran aground at Rhue Point, Ross and Cromarty. Her crew were rescued.
Lawrence	United Kingdom	The cargo ship ran aground off Seaton Delaval, Northumberland and was wrecked. Her crew survived.
Radium	Yugoslavia	The cargo ship was wrecked at Speeton, Yorkshire. Her 28 crew were rescued by rocket apparatus.
Trefusis	United Kingdom	The coaster collided with Grace (United Kingdom) in the North Sea off Spurn Point, Yorkshire and sank. Her crew were rescued. She was refloated on 10 March.

== 18 February ==
List of shipwrecks: 18 February 1923
Ship	State	Description
Domingo	Italy	The cargo ship was driven ashore at Peniche, Portugal. Her crew were rescued.
Jacobus	United Kingdom	The coaster came ashore at Garton, Yorkshire and was severely damaged.
Porpoise	United States	The 8-gross register ton, 28-foot (8.5 m) motor vessel sank without loss of life in Southeast Alaska 2 nautical miles (3.7 km; 2.3 mi) north of Wrangell, Territory of Alaska.
Valur	United Kingdom	The coaster foundered in the Atlantic Ocean west of the Orkney Islands with the loss of two crew. Survivors were rescued by a trawler.
Woodburn	United Kingdom	The cargo ship foundered off the Isle of Whithorn, Wigtownshire with the loss of all hands.

== 19 February ==
List of shipwrecks: 19 February 1923
Ship	State	Description
Fenella	United Kingdom	The passenger ferry collided with Clan Cumming in the River Mersey and was beached at Tranmere, Cheshire. She was refloated on 22 February and drydocked.
Laumur	France	The cargo ship came ashore at Hardelot, Pas-de-Calais. She broke in two and was a total loss.
Santino	United States	The five-masted auxiliary schooner sprang a leak off Nantucket, Massachusetts and was abandoned.
Sapporo Maru No.3	Japan	The cargo ship ran aground on the Noto Peninsula. She was declared a total loss.
Toyo Maru No.3	Japan	The cargo ship ran aground at Kokusanto, Korea. She sank on 27 February. Her crew were rescued.

== 20 February ==
List of shipwrecks: 20 February 1923
Ship	State	Description
Otto Fischer	Germany	The cargo ship foundered in the Mediterranean Sea 90 nautical miles (170 km) north of Cape Villano, Algeria (48°56′N 9°18′W). Her 39 crew were rescued by Hakozaki Maru (Japan) and Older (Norway).
Utopia	United Kingdom	The cargo liner sprang a leak in the Indian Ocean. She was beached at Antalaha, Madagascar and sank. All on board were rescued.

== 21 February ==
List of shipwrecks: 21 February 1923
Ship	State	Description
T. H. Skogland	Norway	The cargo liner ran aground off Bayona, Galicia, Spain. All 36 people on board were rescued but she was a total loss.

== 22 February ==
List of shipwrecks: 22 February 1923
Ship	State	Description
Empress	United Kingdom	The sailing ship was driven ashore at Bibette Head, Alderney, Channel Islands and sank. Her crew were rescued.
Wynor	United Kingdom	The cargo ship foundered in the North Sea north east of Lossiemouth, Morayshire. Her crew survived.

== 23 February ==
List of shipwrecks: 23 February 1923
Ship	State	Description
Bourbancy	France	The cargo ship sank at Marseille, Bouches-du-Rhône whilst laid up.
Cragside	United Kingdom	The cargo ship was driven on the breakwater at Portland Harbour, Dorset. Her crew were rescued before she capsized and sank.
Helen M. Coolen	United Kingdom	The schooner was abandoned in the Atlantic Ocean (39°02′N 66°25′W). Her crew were rescued.
Elwick	United Kingdom	The cargo ship collided with Lisbon Maru (Japan) in the North Sea off Cuxhaven, Germany. She was towed in to Cuxhaven and beached.

== 24 February ==
List of shipwrecks: 24 February 1923
Ship	State	Description
Heim	Norway	The cargo ship departed Cardiff, Glamorgan, United Kingdom for Barcelona, Spain. No further trace, presumed foundered with the loss of all hands.
Villaodrid	Spain	The cargo ship departed from the River Clyde, United Kingdom for Bilbao. No further trace, presumed foundered with the loss of all hands.

== 25 February ==
List of shipwrecks: 25 February 1923
Ship	State	Description
Eslington Firth	United Kingdom	The cargo ship ran aground 2 nautical miles (3.7 km) north of Cushendun, County Antrim. Her crew were rescued. She was a total loss.
Sabina	Spain	The cargo ship ran aground in Fleshwick Bay, Isle of Man. She was refloated later that day and taken to Port Erin, Where she was beached 27 February.

== 26 February ==
List of shipwrecks: 26 February 1923
Ship	State	Description
China Maru	Japan	The cargo ship ran aground at Kara Point, Greece. She was refloated on 3 March.
Echo	United Kingdom	The cargo ship collided with Coimbra (Portugal) in the North Sea off Terschelling, Netherlands and sank. Her eighteen crew were rescued by Yainville (France) and the trawler Richmond (United Kingdom).
Storaker	Norway	The cargo ship sprang a leak in the Atlantic Ocean and was abandoned (46°02′N 43°23′W). Her crew were rescued by City of Flint (United Kingdom).

== 27 February ==
List of shipwrecks: 27 February 1923
Ship	State	Description
Blairlogie	United Kingdom	The cargo ship was abandoned in the Irish Sea 25 nautical miles (46 km) off the Smalls Lighthouse.
Bustard	United Kingdom	The cargo ship sank at Milford Haven, Pembrokeshire. She was refloated on 3 March.
Frank H. Adams (schooner)	United Kingdom	The schooner sprang a leak and was abandoned in the Atlantic Ocean. Her crew were rescued by the trawler William Brady (United Kingdom).
Southwark	United Kingdom	The cargo ship was beached at Porthfawr, Caernarfonshire. Her crew were rescued.
Watson A. West	United States	The schooner came ashore at San Francisco, California and was wrecked. Her crew were rescued.

== 28 February ==
List of shipwrecks: 28 February 1923
Ship	State	Description
Heimdal	Denmark	The schooner was abandoned in the Baltic Sea with the loss of two of her crew. Survivors were rescued by the trawler Vidette, which took her in tow She sank the next day (57°33′N 11°00′E).
Nicolao Tommaseo	Italy	The cargo ship ran aground near the Karabournou Lighthouse, Turkey. She was refloated on 3 March.

== Unknown date ==
List of shipwrecks: Unknown date 1923
Ship	State	Description
Majken	Sweden	The schooner was abandoned in the North Sea 155 nautical miles (287 km) east of Aberdeen, United Kingdom. Five crew were rescued by the trawler Strath Moray (United Kingdom) and landed at Aberdeen on 10 February.
