= Gosforth Academy =

Location
- Great North Road; Newcastle upon Tyne, Tyne & Wear, NE3 2JH; England; 55.0131°N 1.6237°W

Information
- Type: Academy
- Motto: Create Your Future
- Established: 1921; 1973 (as Gosforth High School); 2010 (as Gosforth Academy)
- Local authority: Newcastle upon Tyne (391)
- Specialist: Language College
- Department for Education URN: 136352 Tables
- Ofsted: Reports
- Chairman: George Snaith
- Principal: Preit Chahal
- Gender: Coeducational
- Age: 13 to 18
- Enrolment: 2000 (700+ in sixth form)
- Colours: Navy Blue, White.
- Junior High Academy: Gosforth Junior High Academy
- Post-16 College: Gosforth Academy Sixth Form College
- Community College: Gosforth Community Education College
- Website: http://www.ga.newcastle.sch.uk/

Gosforth Academy (formerly Gosforth High School) is an English secondary school in Gosforth, Newcastle upon Tyne. As well as having a sixth form department it is a specialist Language College. Many of its mainstream students come from three large feeder middle schools: Gosforth Central Middle School, Gosforth East Middle School and Gosforth Junior High Academy.

It also houses a large sixth form college, where the majority of the lower school students continue their studies. There is a Special education centre within the school to aid students who need it. The school houses 'Gosforth Community Education', which provides courses for adults within the local community. The school is also a regional centre for young people with visual impairment.

Both Gosforth Academy and Gosforth Junior High Academy are managed under a single company, Gosforth Federated Academies Limited (A.K.A 'Gosforth Group'), incorporated 5 November 2010.

== History ==
The school was founded in 1973 through the merger of two local comprehensive schools with Gosforth Grammar School.

=== 1921–1944 ===
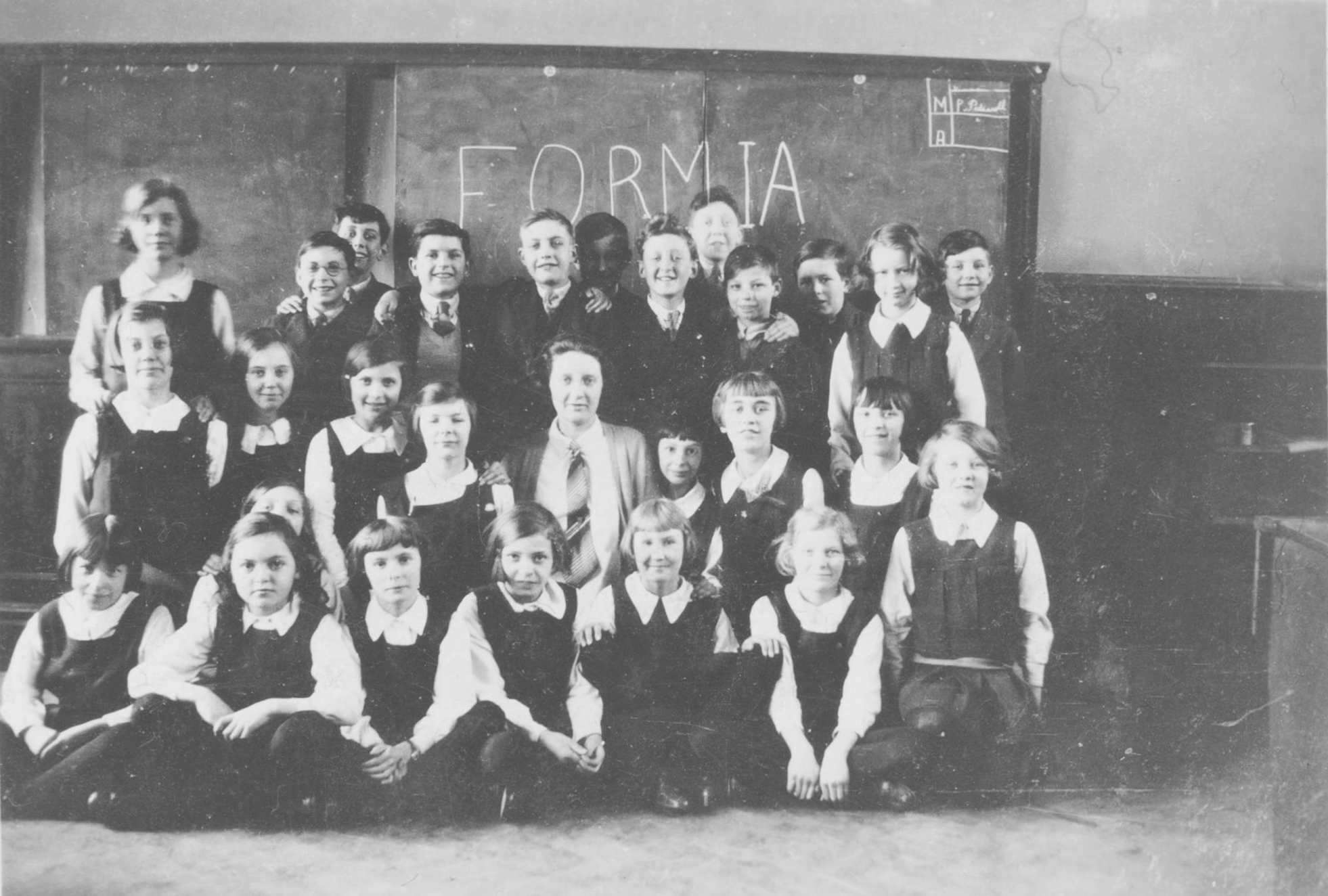
A form at Gosforth Secondary School in 1929

In 1921 Gosforth Secondary School opened. The first permanent buildings were built in the late 1920s. The site was on the opposite side of the Great North Road, to the current site.

=== 1944–1973 ===
Due to the Education Act 1944 the school became Gosforth Grammar School in 1944. In the early 1960s the current site of the School began to be used.

=== 1973–2000 ===
The old logo

In 1973 the local council adopted the three-tier education system. Following this, the Grammar school was combined with Gosforth County Secondary School and Gosforth East County Secondary School, and Gosforth High School was born. The high school moved permanently to the 1960s site.

The site on which Gosforth Grammar stood is now used by Gosforth Central Middle School. The Grammar School building was used by Central Middle, until it was replaced in 2004.

=== 2000–2010 ===
Between 2000 and 2002 the school buildings were renovated, and the new facilities were opened by the prime minister Tony Blair on 29 November 2002. This visit took place at the time of strike action by firefighters, who jeered Blair outside the school, gaining media attention. This new building cost a total of £9 million, of which £6.3 million came from a government grant, "New Deal for Schools", £1.85 million from "Newcastle Great Park" and £800,000 from Newcastle City Council. After the completion of the new buildings, which bear a striking resemblance to airport architecture, the old 'West Wing' was demolished in 2004.

Keith Nancekievill left the school to take up the head teachers post at Hinchingbrooke School, Cambridgeshire, in February 2003 after being head at Gosforth for 15 years. Nancekievill was succeeded by Hugh Robinson who served as head teacher/principal between 2003 and 2020.

In September 2006, a new discipline system was introduced, known as the 'PRAISE Code' (Perform, Reward, Achieve, Inspire, Succeed, Excel).

==== Junior School ====
In September 2006, Gosforth High took over the administration duties of Gosforth West Middle School, in a Federation style agreement. The Federation came into action on 1 January 2007 and Gosforth West was later renamed Gosforth Junior High School after the 2007 Easter break.

=== The future as an Academy ===
In December 2010, the high school became an academy, known as Gosforth Academy, as did the Junior School, now Gosforth Junior High Academy. The Junior Academy building was replaced with a new building which opened in September 2011, replacing the 1930s buildings. The Academy also opened its long anticipated sports facilities.

In 2015 the academy unveiled a bid to build an additional 1,200-place secondary school in Newcastle Great Park as potential plan to meet the demand for school places from the expanding residential community in the area that is adjacent to Gosforth.

In 2018 Seaton Burn College became part of Gosforth Federated Academies and was renamed North Gosforth Academy. In November 2020 Preit Chahal succeeded Hugh Robinson as Principal; Robinson remains as CEO of the Academy.

== Controversies ==
In 2024, A lottery system was used to decide which students would get a place in the school and which would get a place in the Great Park Academy, which was at the time under construction. One of the major reasons for upset was that students were not given as many opportunities in Great Park Academy, and that many would have to start again with subjects they had never taken before. Because of these issues, many parents of children that did not get a place at Gosforth Academy would protest the school's actions. Eventually, over the summer, the school would give places to all the students who had not gotten in, although this was only after protests and a possible lawsuit. However, it would cause further scrutiny when it happened again in 2025.

== Achievements ==
Gosforth Academy is currently the only school with DFES "Training School" status in Newcastle and has been a specialist Language College since 1996. In 1999, the school gained Investors in People accreditation.

In 2008 at the first gathering of the High Performing Schools group, Gosforth High School was recognised as being ranked in the top 10% of schools nationally and the highest performing school in Newcastle. In March 2008, Ofsted inspected the school and rated it 'outstanding'. Coupled with the improved 2008 exam results the school has been classified as a high performing specialist school for the next four years.

== Emblem ==
The school's emblem has 3 main parts: the tree of growth and knowledge, the badge of Newcastle city and the Northumberland coat of arms. For a period of time the school's motto had been "High Achievers".

== Facilities ==
Gosforth Academy's present building is actually two buildings; one building has 2 floors and the other 3 and a half floors (the half being a Mezzanine Level which is currently used as an art gallery and a computer suite). This difference in buildings can be clearly seen when you are crossing between the two via stairs. The room numbers for the bottom floor begin with a zero; the middle floor room numbers begin with a one; and the top floor room numbers begin with two.

The 2002 building cost a total of £9 million. Companies that assisted with the construction of the 2002 building included Newcastle City Design Department, Multicare and Desco. Desco handled the Mechanical and Electrical services for Phase 3, costing £3 million. The school is also part of the "Building Schools for the Future" Initiative.

In 2009 plans to extend the back of the school with a new sports hall were accepted. Building commenced soon after, and was unaffected by the change in the Building Schools for the Future policy. A multimillion-pound gym full of P.E. equipment was built ready for use by September 2011. This is accompanied by a 9-court sports hall.

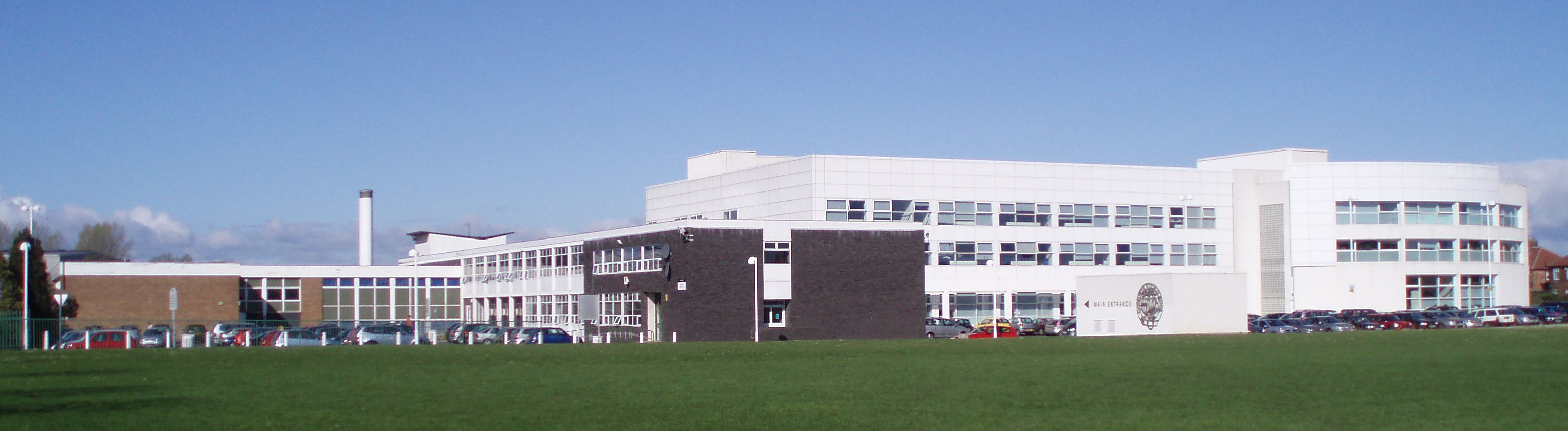
Gosforth High's buildings as they appeared in 2007. The white 2002 building is on the right side, and an additional structure has since been built to the rear-left.

=== Facility list ===
The school has:

- 15 Science laboratories
- 12 ICT rooms (some assigned to a particular subject)
- 2 large libraries (Goodfellow and Cousins)
- A large art department
- A sixth form common room
- A smaller year 11 common room
- A fully equipped Drama studio
- 3 small Music practice rooms
- A dance studio
- One Gym
- One Indoor Sports Court (badminton, basketball & football)
- One Indoor 9 court Sports Hall (badminton, basketball, hockey & football)
- 2 Outdoor Sports Courts (tennis, hockey, basketball, netball, football)
- One Weight-Training room.
- A Student Support Base, which also contains a police base for the area.

The school also has facilities for young people with visual impairment. The two libraries are the Cousins Library, a new library which opened on 8 September 2008 a library for years 9, 10 and 11, and the Old Library, known as the Learning Resource Centre or LRC for sixth form.

The school is able to teach many languages; their mainstream teaching for Modern European languages is concentrated in French, German, Italian and Spanish, and also offer Mandarin as a GCSE or A-Level subject.

=== Computer facilities ===
There are over 50 computers in total in the libraries and 12 dedicated computer rooms. Most of the classrooms have interactive whiteboards. A combination of wired and wireless networks allowing teachers to use their laptops anywhere.

The register in the school is taken via computer, using a Student information system, called SIMS.net, which uses the main PC system. The school also utilises a Virtual learning environment, under the Frog platform.

In the past the school had used a Bromcom hand-held student information system for taking register and had computer workstations provided by Elonex Systems.

=== Sports department ===
The current Sport@Gosforth building was officially opened by former students Alan Shearer and Kathryn Tickell on 3 October 2011.

The school had been planning to replace the previous indoor sports courts with a modern sports facility for many years. The previous indoor sports courts which had earned the nickname "The Shed" by students and teachers alike in the school was demolished in early 2010.

Some of the plans were to have 8 new sports courts within the new building and provision for "all-weather pitches". The current building is a 2-storey sports hall, activities suite and classroom extension to south and west elevation to existing school, with a synthetic turf pitch and 6 × 15 m high lighting columns. The planning application was submitted on 25 November 2008 by AURA Ltd, a local education partnership company in which the council has a 10% share, and was conditionally granted on 5 March 2009. Building work by contractors Sir Robert McAlpine commenced late in the summer of 2009, on the all-weather pitch, and the all-new sports facilities were completed by summer 2011. The synthetic turf pitch was first used on 2 December 2009, and is available for lettings out of school hours. In total the new facilities include a 6 court Sports Hall, new changing rooms, a Fitness Suite, a Climbing wall, a master classroom and a large flexible learning space. These new facilities have been given the name Sport@Gosforth.

The Newcastle Falcons rugby team and their Academy have linked up with the School in an apprenticeship scheme; in 2007 eight students joined the rugby academy for two years. As of 17 May 2025 the Falcons Ace scheme has had a Newcastle Falcons intake of 12. England and Newcastle Falcons player Jamie Blamire was a product of this scheme.

== Post-16 sixth form ==
Gosforth Academy's Sixth Form College offers a larger array of subjects, which its students can study. Not only can students study traditional AS and A-Level subjects, but the 6th form also offers newer qualifications such as BTEC First Diplomas, BTEC National Certificates and GCSE re-sits.

== Location ==
Gosforth Academy is located on Knightsbridge, connecting to a section of the Great North Road in the Parklands electoral ward.

The edge of the back field, next to the 'West Wing' is the location of Grange First School.

== Results ==
In 2013, the school achieved the highest GCSE results in the city of Newcastle upon Tyne. 78% of its students achieved the Goldmark 5 GCSE Passes (A*-C) including English and Maths.

The GCSE Goldmark and A-Level results score by year for 2006 to 2011 are listed below:

Year	GCSE score (local schools' average) (in %)	A-Level score (local schools' average) (in points)
2006	56 (33.5)	736.6 (625.3)
2007	64 (38)	739.6 (633.5)
2008	59 (39.2)	739.1 (684.9)
2009	59 (41.9)	767.7 (735.8)
2010	69	769.2
2011	71	780.6
2012	70	
2013	78	
2014	79	805.5

== Ofsted reports ==
In March 2008, Gosforth High School was rated as outstanding by Ofsted. Ofsted noted that "students of all backgrounds often make outstanding progress in all aspects of their development because they are exceptionally well cared for and supported". Guidance at key points in their school career and with health, social or personal problems was seen to be very good, particularly the personal and academic were seen as excellent. The management and leadership were noted as being outstanding. Ofsted also highlighted that the behaviour within the school, both in and out of class was excellent, enabling a safe environment. The overall teaching quality was marked as "usually good" with some "inspirational" lessons. The school was deemed to have made good progress since the last inspection. Ofsted outlined two main items needed to be improved in the future which were that lesson observations had to focus on the effectiveness of learning and that work given was matched better to the ability of the student.

In April 2011, Ofsted conducted an interim assessment on the school. This was because, as part of the 2011 Education Bill, schools previously assessed to be outstanding, were inspected to ensure they had maintained their standard. If they had done so, they would no longer be inspected, until Ofsted received any concerning information. Gosforth Academy was deemed to have maintained the "outstanding" rating previously given in March 2008.

The last Ofsted report was published in September 2022 and the Academy was rated as 'Good'.

== Feeder schools ==
There are three middle schools in Gosforth, one of which is federated with the Academy (High School), that act as feeder schools to the Academy (High School):

- Gosforth Central Middle School
- Gosforth East Middle School
- Gosforth Junior High Academy

== Notable alumni ==
See Category:People educated at Gosforth Academy

=== Gosforth Grammar School ===
Name	Profession
Derek Chinnery	Controller of BBC Radio 1 from 1978 to 1985.
Noel Forster	Artist.
Carol Galley	Businesswoman, worth over £80 million.
Prof Russell Hindmarsh	Professor of Atomic Physics at Newcastle University from 1961 to 1973.
Robert Sherlaw Johnson	composer, pianist and music scholar.
David Knopfler	Dire Straits guitarist, singer and songwriter.
Mark Knopfler	Guitarist and lead singer of Dire Straits.
Prof Arthur Jones CBE	Principal of the Royal Agricultural College from 1990 to 1997, and of the North of Scotland College of Agriculture from 1986 to 1990.
Prof Edward Potts	Professor of Mining at Newcastle University from 1951 to 1980.
Sir William Ryland CB	Chairman and chief executive of the Post Office Corporation from 1971 to 1977.
Anthony Thomson	Co-founder of Metro Bank UK.

=== Gosforth High School ===
Name	Profession
Donna Air	Actress and television presenter.
Michelle Bass	Reality television star in Big Brother 5.
Michael Chopra	Centre forward for Ipswich Town F.C.
M. W. Craven	Award-winning crime writer
Robbie Elliott	Retired footballer, who notably played for Newcastle United, and currently works as a coach.
Shivani Ghai	Actress.
Shaun Hutchinson	Footballer at Millwall F.C.
Brighid Lowe	Artist who has exhibited at Tate Britain and Jerwood Space and one of the first winners of the Paul Hamlyn Award for visual arts.
Ben Price	Actor, known for roles in Casualty, Coronation Street and Footballers' Wives.
Alan Shearer	Former Striker and manager for Newcastle United F.C. Also former England captain.
Hannah Thompson	Professor of French and Critical Disability Studies at Royal Holloway University of London
Kathryn Tickell	Folk singer.
Dan Willis	Comedian (born Dan Hull) who has performed many times at Edinburgh Festival.
Kim McGuinness	Mayor of the North East

=== Gosforth Academy ===
Name	Profession
Jamie Blamire	Rugby union player.
