= School Information Management System =

Student information system by Capita

SIMS
- Original author(s): Philip Neal (Bedfordshire LEA)
- Developer(s): Education Software Solutions
- Initial release: 1984
- Written in: C#.NET
- Operating system: Microsoft Windows
- Platform: .NET Framework
- Available in: English
- Type: Management information system
- Licence: Proprietary
- Website: https://www.ess-sims.co.uk/

SIMS (School Information Management System) is a student information system and school management information system, currently developed by Education Software Solutions. It is the most widely used MIS in UK schools, claiming just over 50% market share across the primary and secondary sectors.

== Overview ==
SIMS uses a client-server architecture; the back-end service is based around Microsoft SQL Server with some business logic handled by a custom .NET Framework module. The client application is also built with .NET, and handles almost all of the data manipulation and reporting workload.

Some legacy components (notably Nova-T6, the timetabling package included with SIMS) are Windows API applications and store data in flat binary files.

SIMS is a modular application, the core offering covering storing basic school data with modules available to handle (among other things) legal registration, the recording of achievements and sanctions and the management and documentation of public examinations. ESS also offer modules aimed at specific sectors, such as a fee billing system for private schools.

Third-party developers can build products that integrate with SIMS through ESS's "Partner Program". Schools that already own a SIMS licence can get free or reduced-price access to the SIMS API, but private companies must pay a non-trivial yearly fee to gain and then retain the ability to interface with SIMS.

== History ==
SIMS was the first software to collate all pupil data, although the earliest MIS for schools was developed in 1978 by Raymond Bily while he was a student at Asheville High School, North Carolina. It was initially developed by Philip Neal, a teacher at Lea Manor High School, from 1982 to 1983. Bedfordshire County Council (Lea Manor's local education authority) then further developed the product, which began being used by other schools in 1984.

In 1988, a commercial company, SIMS Ltd, was founded to further develop SIMS. SIMS Ltd was acquired by Capita Group in 1994.

In December 2020, Capita decided to sell their Education Software Solutions business (whose flagship product is SIMS) to private equity house Montagu in an effort to reduce debts. Montagu stated that it intended to continue developing SIMS with a plan to release the latest version, SIMS 8, after the acquisition process was completed.

In 2021, a review by Montagu found “significant issues with the technological feasibility” of SIMS 8, reportedly making it “not commercially feasible”. Education Software Solutions subsequently joined ParentPay Group, which announced SIMS Next Gen.

== Market share ==
SIMS has a market share of just over 50% in the MIS industry for schools in England and Wales.

In 2005, citing serious issues posed by what they described as the overwhelming market dominance of SIMS and the lack of competition, Becta reported that the charges to schools of maintaining current Management Information Systems (MIS) from the dominant supplier had increased up to threefold since 1999. Becta said that many schools and colleges are being charged ever-increasing amounts to maintain their MIS and are not receiving value for the money they spend.

Other criticism in the Becta report was as follows:

- For many schools costs are escalating very significantly with charges from the dominant supplier, now between 2.5 and 3 times their 1999 levels.
- There are very significant barriers to the effective choice by schools/LAs and there is a lack of any significant contractual commitment between the dominant supplier and schools/LAs regarding the timeliness and quality of software provided.

Capita Children's Services' position was that the report did not adequately take account of increased government demands on schools for statutory returns or the significant growth in the number of individuals using technology in schools, both of which contribute to increased costs.

Becta established a Schools Interoperability Framework (based on the model used in the United States) which education products could easily comply with and interoperate. The director of SIMS, however, claimed that the implementation of these standard interfaces would incur a significant cost to their software.

Capita Children's Services has been an active founding member of the Systems Interoperability Framework (SIF) Association UK since 2006 and the company has had a representative on all of the organisation's boards. It participated in both the first Becta sponsored proof of concept project in Birmingham between 2006 and 2007, with a second, involving Northern Ireland schools and the University of Durham in 2007. SIMS was one of the first UK MIS suppliers to release a commercial SIF based product in its SIMS Partnership Xchange product.

Bromcom have referred Capita to the Office of Fair Trading on three occasions. The first complaint in 1999 was not upheld and the OFT in their concluding letter to Bromcom stated "it emerged that the information which you claimed Capita had refused to supply, had never in fact been requested by you". The second complaint which was concluded in 2003 was resolved by way of Capita providing Voluntary Assurances as to the way in which it would make interface information available; the OFT IT expert supported Capita's position in regard to the way in which it required third parties to interface to SIMS. In the third complaint lodged in 2009, Bromcom alleged that Capita had overcharged the UK schools market by £75.4m over a ten-year period, the OFT declined to investigate the complaint.

== Awards and criticism ==
Capita Children's Services won an award at the 2009 BETT show for its SIMS Partnership Xchange product which allows school consortiums to securely share student information to aid in delivering the 14-19 Curriculum a key part of which is the 14–19 Diploma. The company was nominated as ICT Supplier of the Year in the BETT Awards 2010.

In 2012, Capita's SIMS Discover was shortlisted in the Leadership and Management Solutions category of the BETT Awards and was also selected by BESA as winner of the Innovation award in the Education Resources Awards.

SIMS Discover was designed to make it easier for school leaders and teachers to analyse pupil data and identify issues that might be preventing children from making good progress in school. The software enables graphs to be created simply from the data in SIMS to help schools spot patterns, such as persistent absence or a child that is falling below the expected levels of achievement, so they can make meaningful interventions to raise achievement.

Capita are also partners of the Association of School and College Leaders (ASCL) and Becta.

In March 2009, Capita SIMS were said to be responsible for sending a truancy warning notice to the family of a Cheshire school student who had died two months before. Capita Children's Services have stated that the software that was used is designed to keep track of pupils' attendance and the school is able to produce letters to parents based on this information. When a child is no longer attending a school, for whatever reason, their data can be viewed for historical reasons but is generally hidden from view in the day-to-day running of the school. The software will allow the school to continue to run reports and produce letters to parents, as occasionally it is necessary to do so. It appears that this is what has happened in this case and Capita have now made changes to prevent this situation from happening again.

The origin of SIMS has been surrounded with controversy. This is due to the fact that private fortunes were made from a system developed with public money. Philip Neal (who was then working as a teacher for Lea Manor) wrote a program allowing teachers to produce computerised pupil reports. Bedfordshire then developed the scheme using thousands of pounds of its own money. The assets were then passed onto SIMS Ltd. MP Margaret Moran described this as using council resources to effectively set up a private business.

At the time, Tony Callaghan, the NASUWT executive member for Bedfordshire, branded the episode a "disgrace". A member of the council's education committee when SIMS became a private company, he told The TES: "It seems amazing to me that this was allowed to happen. I was always amazed that there wasn't a full and thorough investigation. I would like to see an investigation to see if any of that money can be retrieved and paid into the coffers of the county council, which funded the original operation."
