= Bromcom =

Software company in United Kingdom

Bromcom Computers plc
- Formerly: Shoebox Ltd. (July–Nov 1986)
- Company type: Public
- Industry: Technology company
- Founded: 24 July 1986; 39 years ago
- Founder: Ali Guryel
- Headquarters: Bromley, Greater London, England
- Website: bromcom.com

Bromcom Computers plc is a British technology company, based in Bromley. It provides schools, colleges, local authorities and multi academy trusts with Cloud MIS (management information software) and Finance software.

== History ==
Bromcom was founded in 1986 by computer scientist Ali Guryel as a private company serving business-to-business alongside sister company Frontline Technology Ltd.

Bromcom's first product in the early 1990s was the EARS (Electronic Attendance Registration System), a software package designed to replace paper registers, which was shown on the BBC's Tomorrow's World in January 1994.

In 1999, consultancy firm Capita did not cooperate with Bromcom's request for improved interoperability with their SIMS system: Bromcom complained to the now defunct Office of Fair Trading (OfT), who sided Bromcom in that Capita was required to offer interoperability. Later in 2020, it was also involved in legal disputes with United Learning over claims of a breach of correct procurement process, and the High Court ultimately ruled in Bromcom's favor whilst confirming no rule breaches were “deliberate” or in “bad faith”.

In June 2000, Bromcom launched a 'Parent Portal', MyChildAtSchool.com, to enable pupil's parents to access information about their child's academic performance via the internet.
