= Gosforth East Middle School =

School in Newcastle upon Tyne, England

Location
- Harewood Road; Newcastle Upon Tyne, Tyne & Wear, NE3 5JT; England; 55.0155°N 1.6166°W

Information
- Type: Foundation school
- Motto: In the pursuit of excellence
- Established: 1960; 1973 (as Gosforth East Middle)
- Local authority: Newcastle upon Tyne (391)
- Department for Education URN: 108521 Tables
- Ofsted: Reports
- Head teacher: Tim J Stout
- Gender: Coeducational
- Age: 9 to 13
- Enrolment: 474
- Website: http://www.gosfortheast.newcastle.sch.uk/

Gosforth East Middle School is a middle school in Gosforth, Newcastle upon Tyne, England. Students usually transfer to Gosforth Academy. The school is in the Parklands electoral ward. As of August 2025 the current headmaster is Mr. Stout.

== History ==
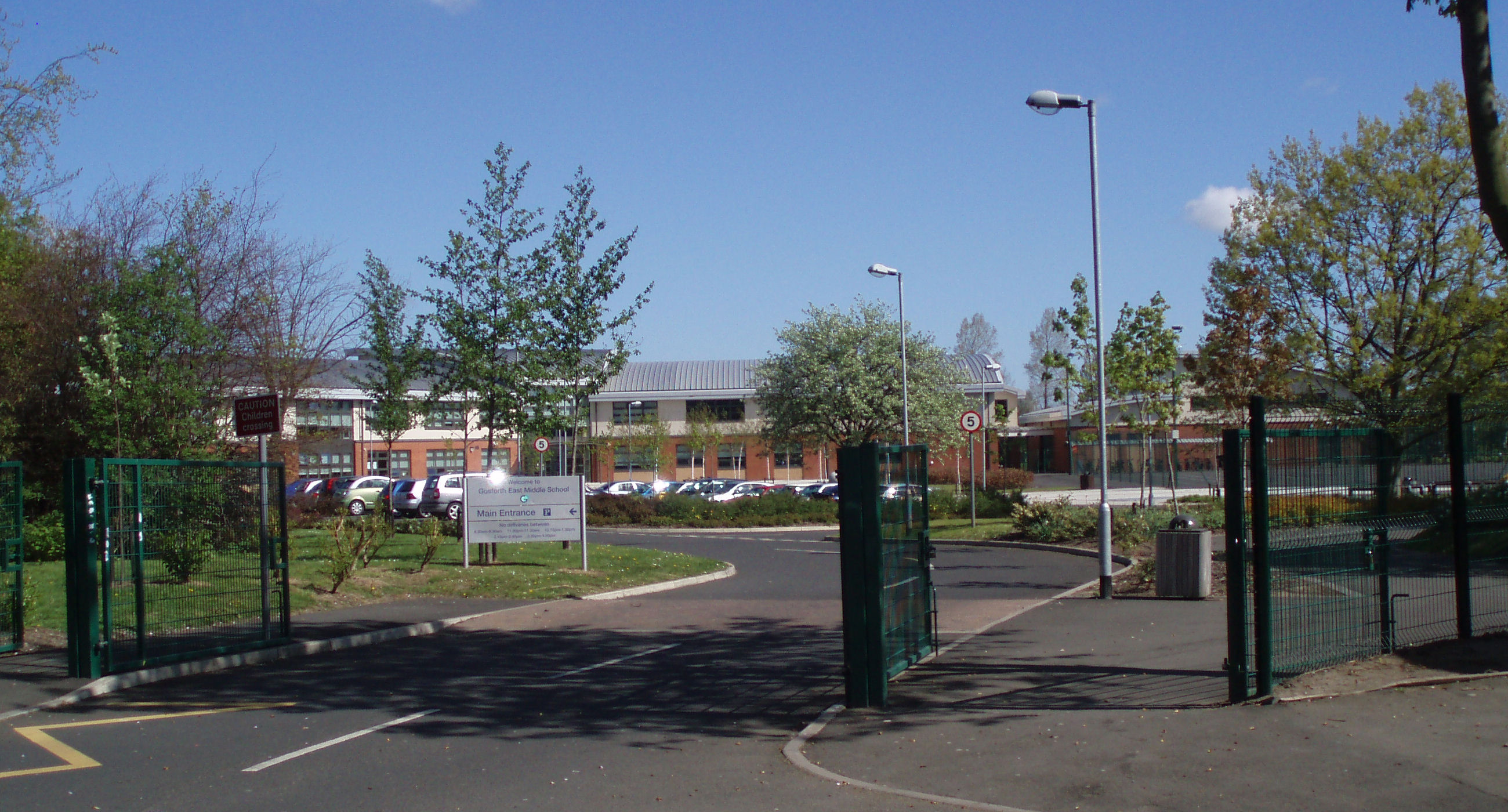
Gosforth East Middle School building

The school started in 1960 as Gosforth East Secondary School and became Gosforth East Middle School, known as GEMS when Northumberland County Council changed to a three-tier education system in 1973.

In 2003, Gosforth East had a new building erected. This building costing £4 million was officially opened on 12 September 2003 by David Bell, who then was Chief Inspector of Schools.

Gosforth East was inspected by Ofsted in 2009; the report noted, "this is a good and improving school."

In 2014 the Gosforth Schools Trust was formed with Archibald First, Archbishop Runcie CE First, Broadway East First, Brunton First, Dinnington First, Gosforth Central Middle, Gosforth East Middle, Gosforth Park First, Grange First, Regent Farm First and South Gosforth First School.

== Results ==
The KS2 SATs results score by year are listed below:

Year	Results score
2005	250
2006	260
2007	269
2008	284

The latest Ofsted report was published in June 2024 and Gosforth park Middle School was rated as Good.

== Feeder schools ==
- Broadway East First School
- Dinnington First School
- Gosforth Park First School

== Notable alumni ==
- Robbie Elliott, retired footballer notably for Newcastle United.
- Ben Price, Actor, known for roles in Casualty and Footballers' Wives.
- M. W. Craven, award-winning crime writer
