= Gosforth Junior High Academy =

Junior High Academy

Location
- Regent Avenue; Newcastle Upon Tyne, Tyne & Wear, NE3 1DY; England; 55.0080°N 1.6269°W

Information
- Type: Academy
- Motto: Create your future
- Established: 1937; 2007 (as Gosforth Junior High)
- Local authority: Newcastle upon Tyne
- Department for Education URN: 136348 Tables
- Ofsted: Reports
- Principal: Denise Waugh
- Gender: Coeducational
- Age: 9 to 13
- Enrolment: 757
- Federated with: Gosforth Academy
- Website: http://www.juniorhighacademy.org.uk

Gosforth Junior High Academy, formerly known as Gosforth West Middle School is a middle school in Gosforth, Newcastle upon Tyne, England. It is the Junior School of Gosforth Academy.

It is one of three middle schools where students usually transfer to Gosforth Academy. The school is in the West Gosforth electoral ward. It is one of Newcastle's "Special Educational Needs" centres for Visual Impairment, along with Regent Farm First School and Gosforth Academy.

== History ==
=== 1937–2005 ===
The logo of Gosforth West Middle

The school started in 1937, as Gosforth Senior Council School, with separate Boys and Girls Departments.

The school changed into a Secondary Modern School in 1944, due to the Education Act 1944. The school name became Gosforth County Modern School / Gosforth County Secondary School.

The school became Gosforth West Middle School, when Northumberland County Council changed to the Three-tier education system in 1973.

=== 2005–present ===
By March 2005, Gosforth West was experiencing some problems and was placed under "Special Measures" by Ofsted. In July 2006 the school had vastly improved and was removed from special measures.

In September 2005, Kathryn Thomas (seconded from Gosforth High School) became the schools Acting Headteacher, replacing Paul Hugall. David Sheppard (also seconded from Gosforth High School) became Assistant Headteacher.

In September 2006, Gosforth High took over the administration duties of Gosforth West Middle School, in a Federation style agreement. The federation came into action on 1 January 2007. Gosforth West was also renamed as Gosforth Junior High School after the Easter break. The uniform was set to change in September 2007, this included the removal of the tie from the uniform. The PRAISE Code which was introduced at the High School is also in practice at the Junior High School. In March 2009 planning applications to create a new school building were accepted, and later that year building work commenced.

By 2011 the school had become an Academy along with the High School, now Gosforth Academy.

== Facilities ==
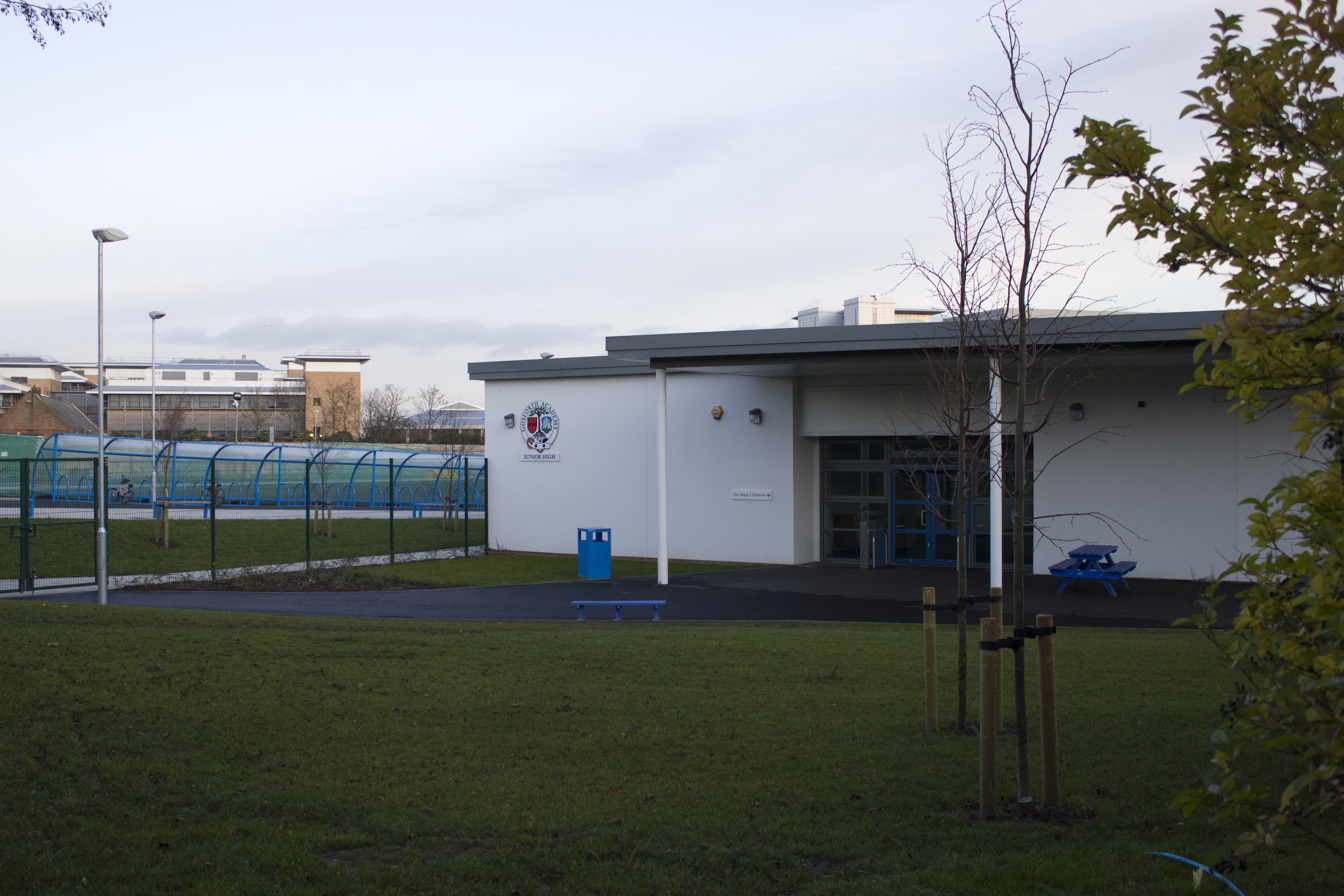
The Key Stage 2 entrance of the 2011 buildings of Gosforth Junior High Academy. A section of the 1930s buildings can still be seen in the middle-right. The Virgin Money banking headquarters can be seen in the background.

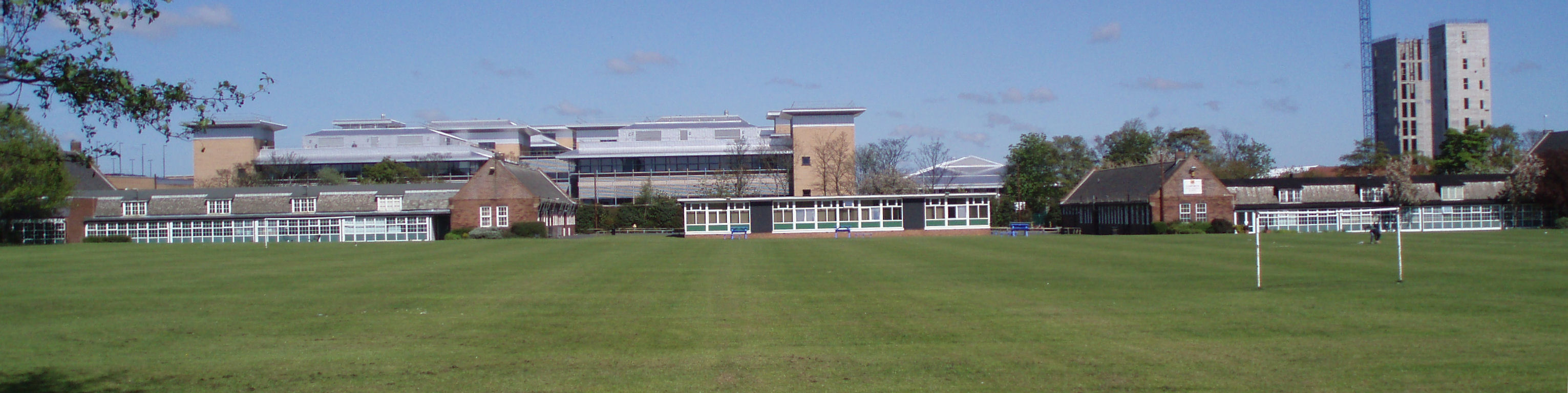
The former Gosforth West Middle School buildings are in the foreground, and the headquarters of the Northern Rock bank in the background.

As of 2011 Gosforth Junior High is using a new building; this followed East and Central's moves to new facilities. Previously the school had been using the 1930s building as well as some temporary buildings, and the new building was a part of the "Building Schools for the Future" Initiative. A new building is currently being developed.

Gosforth Junior High had concrete tennis courts, until in around 2003 the area of land on which it was situated, was used for an additional building for Archibald First School.

On 6 June 2007, David Bellamy opened the school's re-built wildlife garden, in one of the buildings' quadrangles, which has had contributions from local organisations, such as Northern Rock, The Gosforth Round Table and the school's pupils.

=== New buildings ===
A planning application which was submitted on 18 December 2008 by AURA Ltd, a local education partnership company in which the council has a 10% share, was conditionally granted on 20 March 2009. This application was for the "Erection of two-storey school (Class D1) with associated outdoor play areas and 2 hard surfaced games courts, 114 space car park with access and egress onto Regent Avenue, covered cycle parking, pedestrian access onto Jubilee Road and hard and soft landscaping". Building work began in November 2009 and the new school buildings were in use by September 2011.

== Ofsted report 2008 ==
Gosforth Junior High was inspected by Ofsted in June 2008, and they remarked that it "is a good and improving school with outstanding features." Other remarks Ofsted had were "The outstanding leadership of the federation, principal and senior managers is continuing to steer the school in the right direction." and The quality of teaching and learning is good and some is outstanding."

== Results ==
The KS2 SATs results score by year are listed below:

Year	Results score
2005	241
2006	253
2007	238
2008	233

== Notable alumnus ==
=== Gosforth West Middle School ===
- Michael Chopra, centre forward for Ipswich Town F.C.

== See also ==
- Gosforth
- Gosforth Academy
- Gosforth East Middle School
