= Civil parishes in Tyne and Wear =

English local government subdivision

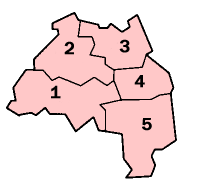
A map of Tyne and Wear, showing the Metropolitan Boroughs: (1) Gateshead; (2) Newcastle upon Tyne; (3) North Tyneside; (4) South Tyneside; and (5) Sunderland

There are 10 civil parishes in the ceremonial county of Tyne and Wear, most of the county being unparished; North Tyneside and South Tyneside are completely unparished. It is the county of England with the lowest number of civil parishes. At the 2001 census, there were 41,044 people living in the 10 parishes, accounting for 3.8 per cent of the county's population. A civil parish is the lowest unit of local government in England.

== History ==
Parishes arose from Church of England divisions, and were originally purely ecclesiastical divisions. Over time they acquired civil administration powers.

The Highways Act 1555 made parishes responsible for the upkeep of roads. Every adult inhabitant of the parish was obliged to work four days a year on the roads, providing their own tools, carts and horses; the work was overseen by an unpaid local appointee, the Surveyor of Highways.

The poor were looked after by the monasteries, until their dissolution. In 1572, magistrates were given power to 'survey the poor' and impose taxes for their relief. This system was made more formal by the Poor Law Act 1601, which made parishes responsible for administering the Poor Law; overseers were appointed to charge a rate to support the poor of the parish. The 19th century saw an increase in the responsibility of parishes, although the Poor Law powers were transferred to Poor Law Unions. The Public Health Act 1872 grouped parishes into Rural Sanitary Districts, based on the Poor Law Unions; these subsequently formed the basis for Rural Districts.

Parishes were run by vestries, meeting annually to appoint officials, and were generally identical to ecclesiastical parishes, although some townships in large parishes administered the Poor Law themselves; under the Divided Parishes and Poor Law Amendment Act 1882, all extra-parochial areas and townships that levied a separate rate became independent civil parishes.

Civil parishes in their modern sense date from the Local Government Act 1894, which abolished vestries; established elected parish councils in all rural parishes with more than 300 electors; grouped rural parishes into Rural Districts; and aligned parish boundaries with county and borough boundaries. Urban civil parishes continued to exist, and were generally coterminous with the Urban District, Municipal Borough or County Borough in which they were situated; many large towns contained a number of parishes, and these were usually merged into one. Parish councils were not formed in urban areas, and the only function of the parish was to elect guardians to Poor Law Unions; with the abolition of the Poor Law system in 1930 the parishes had only a nominal existence.

The Local Government Act 1972 retained civil parishes in rural areas, and many former Urban Districts and Municipal Boroughs that were being abolished were replaced by new successor parishes; urban areas that were considered too large to be single parishes became unparished areas.

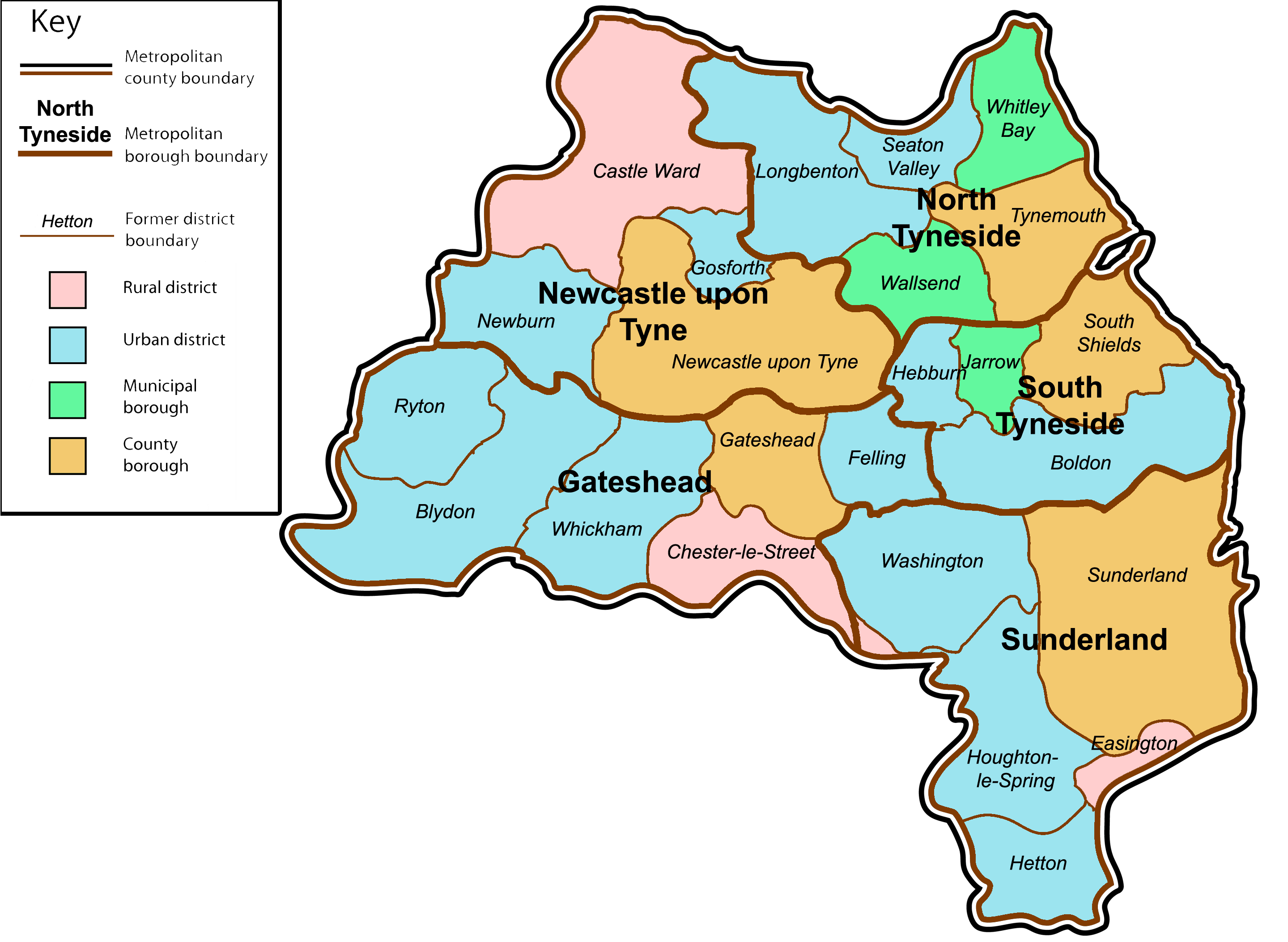
Tyne and Wear showing the former local authorities

== The current position ==
Recent governments have encouraged the formation of town and parish councils in unparished areas, and the Local Government and Rating Act 1997 gave local residents the right to demand the creation of a new civil parish.

A parish council can become a town council unilaterally, simply by resolution; and a civil parish can also gain city status, but only if that is granted by the Crown. The chairman of a town or city council is called a mayor. The Local Government and Public Involvement in Health Act 2007 introduced alternative names: a parish council can now choose to be called a community; village; or neighbourhood council.

Civil parishes with town status

== List of civil parishes and unparished areas ==
Image	Name	Status	Population	District	Former local authority	Refs
	Birtley	Unparished area	11,377	Gateshead	Chester le Street; Rural District	
	Blaydon	Unparished area	27,552	Gateshead	Blaydon; Urban District	
	Felling	Unparished area	35,490	Gateshead	Felling; Urban District	
	Gateshead	Unparished area	62,338	Gateshead	Gateshead; County Borough	
	Lamesley	Civil parish	3,928	Gateshead	Chester le Street; Rural District	
	Ryton	Unparished area	16,626	Gateshead	Ryton; Urban District	
	Whickham	Unparished area	33,840	Gateshead	Whickham; Urban District	
	Blakelaw and North Fenham	Civil parish	6,468	Newcastle upon Tyne	Newcastle upon Tyne; County Borough	
	Brunswick	Civil parish	1,024	Newcastle upon Tyne	Castle Ward; Rural District	
	Dinnington	Civil parish	1,710	Newcastle upon Tyne	Castle Ward; Rural District	
	Gosforth	Unparished area	22,297	Newcastle upon Tyne	Gosforth; Urban District	
	Hazlerigg	Civil parish	1,053	Newcastle upon Tyne	Castle Ward; Rural District	
	Newburn	Unparished area	41,294	Newcastle upon Tyne	Newburn; Urban District	
	Newcastle upon Tyne	Unparished area	174,235	Newcastle upon Tyne	Newcastle upon Tyne; County Borough	
	North Gosforth	Civil parish	3,527	Newcastle upon Tyne	Castle Ward; Rural District	
	Woolsington	Civil parish	7,928	Newcastle upon Tyne	Castle Ward; Rural District	
	Earsdon	Unparished area	10,129	North Tyneside	Seaton Valley; Urban District	
	Longbenton	Unparished area	47,414	North Tyneside	Longbenton; Urban District	
	Tynemouth	Unparished area	55,759	North Tyneside	Tynemouth; County Borough	
	Wallsend	Unparished area	42,842	North Tyneside	Wallsend; Municipal Borough	
	Whitley Bay	Unparished area	35,515	North Tyneside	Whitley Bay; Municipal Borough	
	Boldon	Unparished area	46,508	South Tyneside	Boldon; Urban District	
	Hebburn	Unparished area	21,820	South Tyneside	Hebburn; Urban District	
	Jarrow	Unparished area	16,046	South Tyneside	Jarrow; Municipal Borough	
	South Shields	Unparished area	68,411	South Tyneside	South Shields; County Borough	
	Burdon	Civil parish	971	Sunderland	Easington; Rural District	
	Hetton	Town	14,402	Sunderland	Hetton; Urban District	
	Houghton le Spring	Unparished area	33,179	Sunderland	Houghton le Spring; Urban District	
	Sunderland	Unparished area	176,768	Sunderland	Sunderland; County Borough	
	Warden Law	Civil parish	33	Sunderland	Easington; Rural District	
	Washington	Unparished area	55,454	Sunderland	Washington; Urban District	

== See also ==
- List of civil parishes in England
