= East Gosforth =

Coordinates: 54.988°N 1.593°W

- Ward
- Location within the United Kingdom
- OS grid reference: NZ261660
- Ceremonial county: Tyne and Wear
- Country: England
- Sovereign state: United Kingdom

East Gosforth also known as Gosforth East is a former electoral ward in Newcastle upon Tyne, Tyne and Wear, UK. It was created in 2004. The population of the ward is 8,981, increasing to 10,145 at the 2011 Census, 3.5% of the total population of Newcastle upon Tyne. Car ownership in the area is 68.8%, higher than the city average of 54.7%. It was formerly one half of Gosforth's wards, along with the West Gosforth ward.

== Education ==
There are four schools within the East Gosforth ward:

- Archbishop First School
- South Gosforth First School
- Newcastle School for Boys, formally known as Newlands Preparatory School

== Recreation and leisure ==
The ward has two parks, Quarry Park and the 2004 Green Flag Award winner, Gosforth Central Park. The ward has many large green areas including parts of Jesmond Dene.

The Brandling Arms pub on the High Street has its own local edition of My Monopoly, using Gosforth locations. Other pubs on Gosforth High Street within the ward are the Queen Victoria (known for a short time as Northern Lights), the Blacksmith's Arms, Barca (formally Earl Grey) and the Job Bulman, a branch of Wetherspoons located in the former 1920s post office building on St Nicholas Avenue, and named after the founder of Bulman Village. The County Hotel, towards the southern end of the centre of Gosforth, is the southernmost High Street pub.

== Ward boundary ==
The boundary of the East Gosforth ward starts at the Blue House roundabout. It continues by heading east along Jesmond Dene Road to the Ouseburn and then north along the Ouseburn to Haddricksmill Bridge. The boundary continues north to the rear of the properties on Ridgewood Crescent and across the Metro line to continue north along the course of the Ouseburn. At the footbridge across the Ouseburn, it heads west around the perimeter of Gosforth Golf Course and continues west along Links Green Walk. It then leads west to the Asda Superstore on the Great North Road. The ward boundary continues south on Great North Road/Gosforth High Street along to the Blue House roundabout, where it ends.

== Political ==
East Gosforth was formerly represented by 3 Liberal Democrat councillors, Cllr Henry Gallagher, Cllr David Slesenger and Cllr Dominic Raymont . It was also part of Newcastle North Constituency and represented by Labour MP, Catherine Mckinnell.

== Charts and tables ==
Age group	Number
Under 16	1,549
16–24	1,112
25–44	2,865
45–64	1,930
65–74	646
75+	882

Ethnicity	Number	%
White	8,398	93.2
Afro-Caribbean	58	0.6
South Asian	282	3.1
Chinese	55	0.6
Other	212	2.4

The ward has 4,118 housing spaces of which 4.1% are vacant this is lower than the city average of 5.3%. Owner occupied property stands at 73.9% much higher than the city average of 53.3%. The properties are as follows.

Property type	Number	%
Detached	170	4.1
Semi-detached	1,404	34.1
Terraced	1,304	31.6
Flats	1,244	30.2
Other	0	0
