= Gosforth Central =

Gosforth Central may refer to:

- Gosforth Central Academy, a school; see Building Schools for the Future
- Gosforth Central Park, a park near to Gosforth High Street in Gosforth, Newcastle upon Tyne, England
