= Gosforth East =

Gosforth East may refer to:

- East Gosforth
- Gosforth East Middle School, a middle school in Gosforth, Newcastle upon Tyne, England
