= Monkwearmouth Hospital =

- Cumbria, Northumberland, Tyne and Wear NHS Foundation Trust
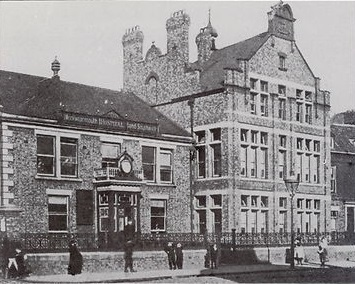
- The old Monkwearmouth and Southwick Hospital on Roker Road

- Shown in Tyne and Wear

Geography
- Location: Sunderland, Tyne and Wear, England, United Kingdom
- Coordinates: 54.9239°N 1.3864°W

Organisation
- Care system: Public NHS
- Type: Mental health

Services
- Emergency department: No Accident & Emergency

History
- Founded: 1873

Links
- Lists: Hospitals in England

Monkwearmouth Hospital is a mental health facility on Newcastle Road, Monkwearmouth, Sunderland, England. It is managed by the Cumbria, Northumberland, Tyne and Wear NHS Foundation Trust.

== History ==
The hospital has its origins in the Monkwearmouth and Southwick Dispensary which was established on Roker Road in July 1873 through the efforts of the Reverend Canon Miles, the local parish vicar, and financial support from Samuel Tyzack, a local businessman. Two additional wards were added in February 1896. It became the Monkwearmouth and Southwick Hospital in 1896.

The foundation stone for a new hospital in Newcastle Road was laid by the Prince of Wales on 2 July 1930. The new hospital in Newcastle Road was opened in July 1932, and it joined the National Health Service as the Sunderland Orthopaedic and Accident Hospital in 1948. A new ward for patients with mental health difficulties known as the Cleadon Ward opened at the hospital in October 2016.
