= Sanderson Hospital =

- Newcastle upon Tyne Hospitals NHS Foundation Trust
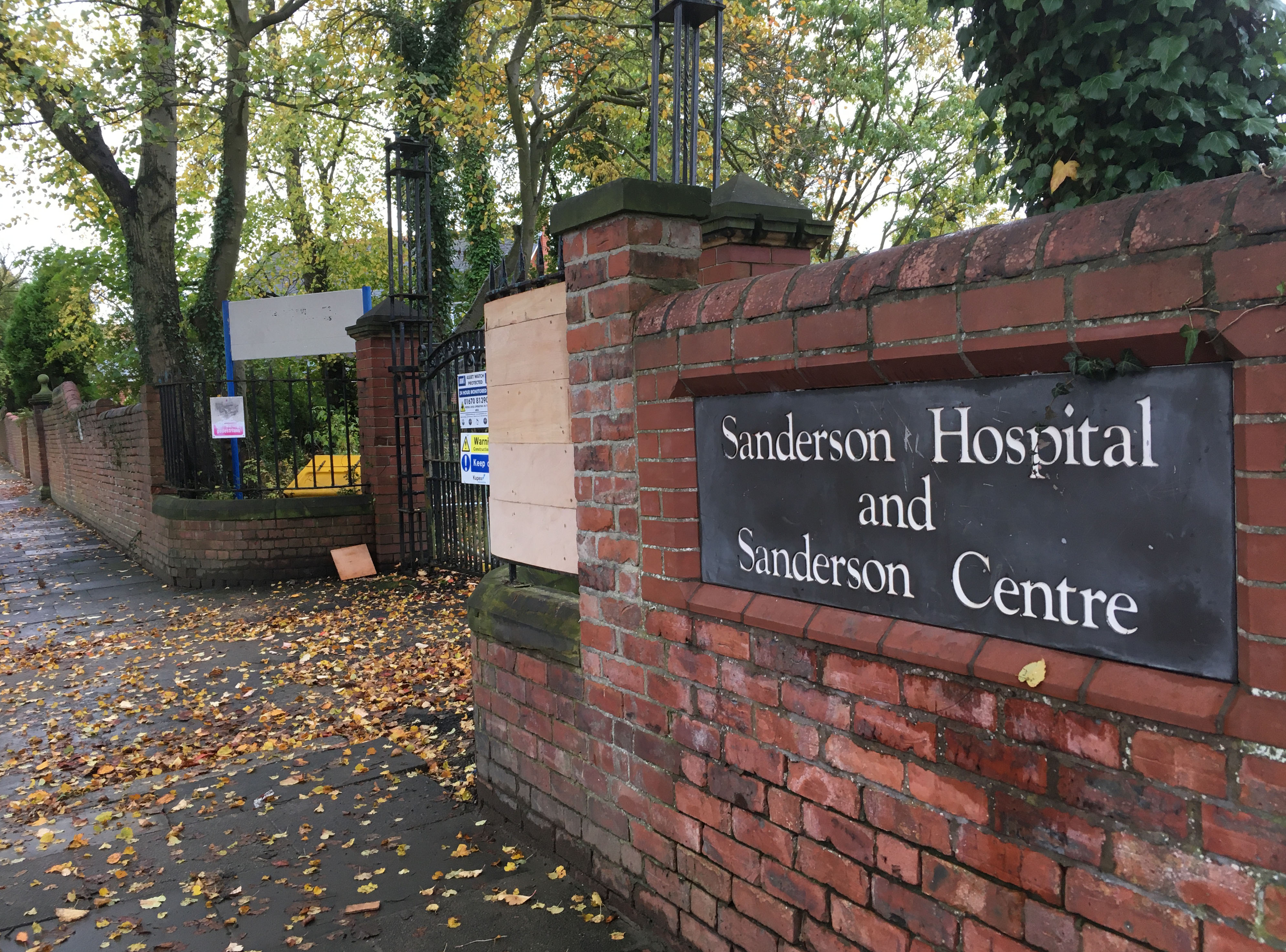
- The former signage of Sanderson Hospital and Sanderson Centre, 2020.

- Location in Newcastle upon Tyne Location in Tyne and Wear

Geography
- Location: Gosforth, Newcastle upon Tyne, England, United Kingdom
- Coordinates: 55.005°N 1.629°W

Organisation
- Care system: NHS England
- Type: Orthopaedic hospital

History
- Founded: 1888 (Whickham); 30 September 1897 (Gosforth)
- Closed: May 2005

Links
- Lists: Hospitals in England

Sanderson Hospital was an orthopaedic hospital for children and an elderly care facility used by the NHS in Gosforth, Newcastle upon Tyne, UK.

== History ==
The WJ Sanderson Home for Destitute and Crippled Children was established in Whickham in 1888 by William John Sanderson, a local philanthropist. Its purpose was to care for destitute children who couldn't be housed in workhouses due to physical disabilities. Shortly after opening it moved to larger premises at Red House in Wallsend on 1 June 1889, before opening its Gosforth site in 1897. The Gosforth site was opened by a Mrs. Hilton Philipson on 30 September 1897.

In 1914 the hospital buildings was extended to allow for the treatment of more patients. Until the implementation of the National Health Service Act 1946 the hospital operated independently, and in July 1948 it came under the control of a Hospital Management committee as part of the National Health Service. While independent the hospital also had its own school based on-site. The site was used as the long-stay orthopaedic hospital for the area. In 1974 the hospital given over to the care of the elderly during NHS reforms.

The hospital had various subtle name changes over the years: in 1929 it became the WJ Sanderson Home for Crippled Children; around 1935 it was renamed the WJ Sanderson Orthopaedic Hospital and School for Children; around 1950 it became known as the Sanderson Orthopaedic Hospital; and in 1964 it became known as Sanderson Hospital.

=== Closure ===
The services provided by the hospital were steadily reduced as they were moved to the larger hospitals such as the Freeman and General Hospitals. Services for the elderly were closed in 1996. By 2003 only community out-patient services remained (then known as the Sanderson Centre in an annex) and there were plans to move those too, bringing the site's use by the NHS to an end.

Since finally closing in May 2005 the site had been disused for more than 15 years, and the hospital buildings, some of which were Victorian, were later demolished. In 2006 plans existed to turn the site, by now blighted by vandals, into housing which sparked protests from the local community. In 2011 there was an attempt to build housing on the site with Taylor Wimpey having planning permission, but later pulled out of the scheme in 2013. There had also been an attempt to build a new health facility with the Malhotra Group on the site that was abandoned in 2018.

As of 2020, the site on Salters Road is currently being redeveloped into 37 dwellings, known as Sycamore Square. The planning that was approved by Newcastle City Council in February is for 23 large houses and 14 apartments centred around a large green area. The development is headed by Lok, part of Newcastle-based Morton Group, who bought the plot in June 2019 from Newcastle upon Tyne Hospitals NHS Foundation Trust.

== See also ==
- List of hospitals in England
