= Andrew Leslie (shipbuilder) =

Scottish shipbuilder

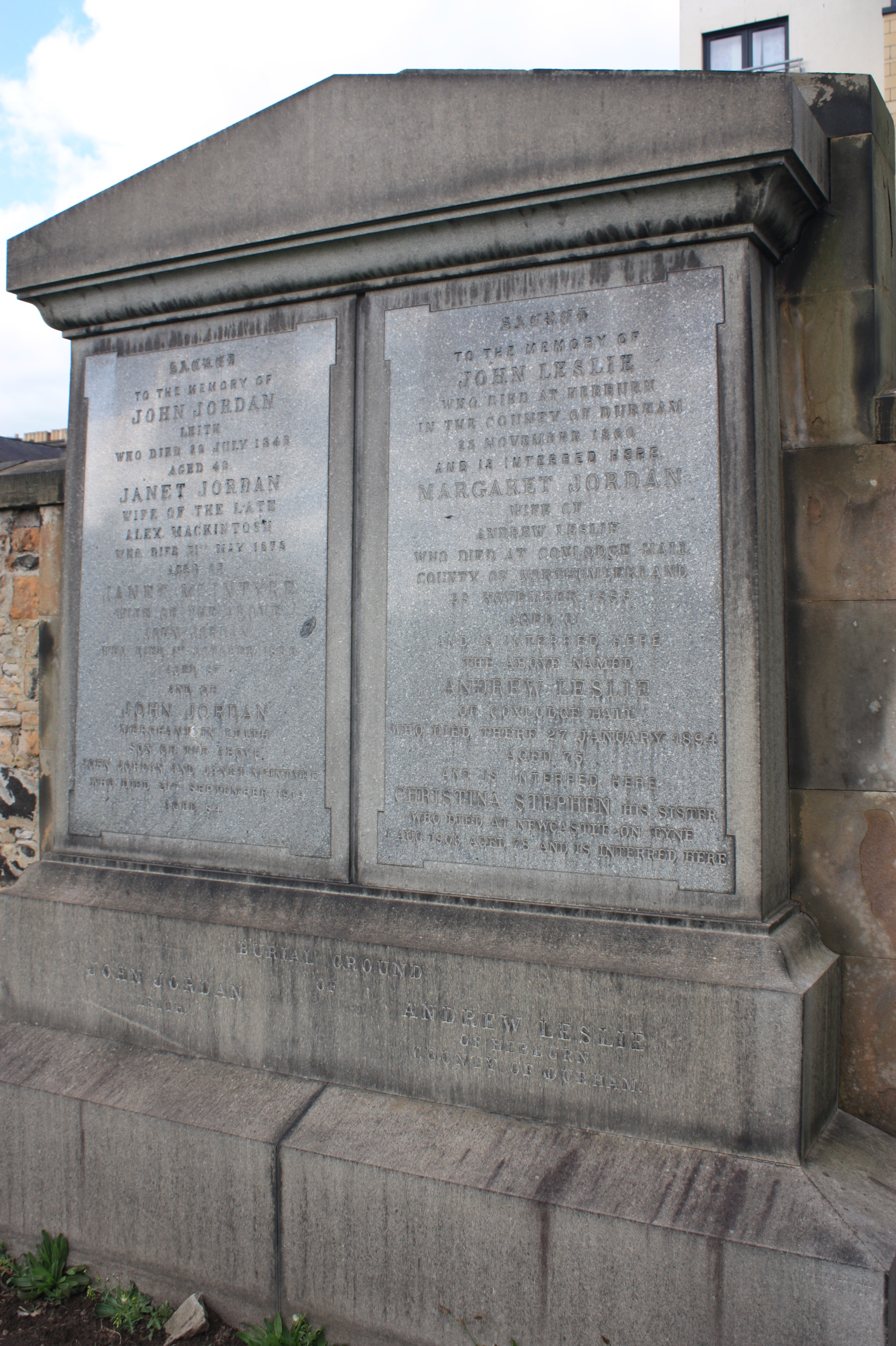
The grave of Andrew Leslie of Coxlodge, Rosebank Cemetery

Andrew Leslie (1818–1894) was a Scottish shipbuilder.

Born in 1818 in Garth, Dunrossness, Shetland to Christian Allison and Robert Leslie, Leslie later moved to Aberdeen. In 1853 Leslie relocated to Hebburn in North-East England where he founded the shipbuilding company A. Leslie and Company. When Andrew Leslie retired in 1886, A. Leslie and Company merged with the locomotive manufacturer R and W Hawthorn to create Hawthorn Leslie and Company.

In Hebburn, Leslie largely funded St. Andrew's Presbyterian Church, which opened in 1873, and built other buildings including homes for his workers, schools for their children. He was married to Margaret Leslie. Leslie also lived at Coxlodge Hall in Gosforth

He died on 27 January 1894 aged 75. He is buried in a family plot at Rosebank Cemetery in Edinburgh, against the west wall, near the north-west corner.
