= Jubilee Theatre =

Theatre in Newcastle upon Tyne, England

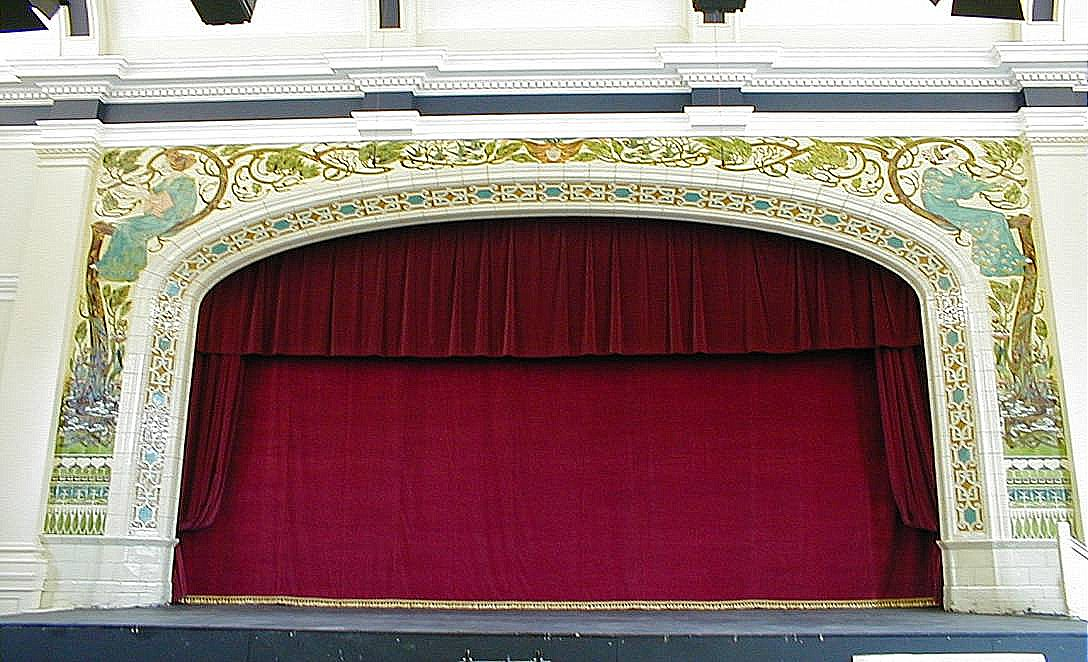
- Interactive map of Jubilee Theatre
- Address: St Nicholas Hospital, Gosforth; Newcastle upon Tyne; UK
- Coordinates: 55.006°N 1.634°W
- Current use: Theatre and meetings

Construction
- Opened: 30 May 1900; 126 years ago

Website
- web.archive.org/web/20110930051613/http://www.juniperproductions.org.uk/

The Jubilee Theatre, is a grade II listed building theatre. It opened in 1899 in St Nicholas Hospital, Gosforth, Newcastle upon Tyne, England.

== History ==
The Victorian theatre was opened on 30 May 1900 and features a plaque at the main entrance to mark the event. It features a proscenium arch of Art Nouveau Doulton tiles by W.J. Neatby, depicting two pre-Raphaelite figures which face east and west, as the theatre faces true north and south.

Originally, the theatre had a sprung dance floor made from maple and a full sized orchestra pit, and was used for both shows and dances.

So that films could be shown in the theatre a projection room was added to the back of the building in 1920 housing at least two movie projectors.

Two doors lead into the theatre from the main corridor. The male and female patients at the hospital were constantly separated; men would enter using the door on the left, and women the right door. Rules dictated that men stayed on the left of the auditorium and women on the right, and were only allowed together for dancing. On the men's side there is a door out to a corridor which was previously used as the 'Gentlemen's Smoking Promenade' and is now used as a fire corridor.

== Current usage ==
Currently the theatre is primarily used by four groups: Juniper Productions a drama group for sufferers of mental health difficulties, which was founded in 1998; First Act Theatre, a youth theatre company, who have operated from the theatre since 1991; Stepping Out A drama group and Newcastle University Medical School's Musical Medics Society who perform a yearly charity show.

== Notable actors ==
The Jubilee Theatre has been a stage to a number of actors during their early career, including:

- Jill Halfpenny
- Donna Air
- Dale Meeks
- Cheryl Tweedy
- Michael O'Riordan
