= Gosforth Council Offices =

Municipal building in Gosforth, Tyne and Wear, England

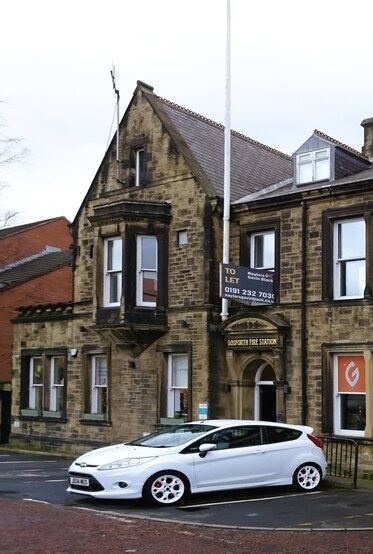
- The building in 2024

- Shown in Tyne and Wear
- 55.0076°N 1.6195°W
- Location: High Street, Gosforth

History
- Built: 1895

Site notes
- Architectural style: Neoclassical style

Gosforth Council Offices is a former municipal building in the High Street in Gosforth, Tyne and Wear in England. The building, which served as the offices of Gosforth Urban District Council, is now in commercial use.

== History ==
Following significant population growth, largely associated with its status as a residential suburb of Newcastle upon Tyne, a local board was established in Gosforth in 1872. In anticipation of the local board being succeeded by Gosforth Urban District Council in 1894, civic leaders decided to commission council offices for meetings of the new council. The site they selected was open land on the east side of Gosforth High Street.

Construction of new building started in 1894. The building was designed in the neoclassical style, built in rubble masonry with ashlar stone dressings and was completed in 1895. The design involved an asymmetrical main frontage of four bays facing onto the High Street. The first bay on the left, which was single storey, was fenestrated with a pair of sash windows, while the second bay contained two sash windows on the ground floor, a prominent oriel window on the first floor, and a lancet window in the gable above. The third bay featured a doorway flanked by pilasters and brackets supporting an entablature and a segmental pediment containing a date stone. The fourth bay was fenestrated by pairs of sash windows on both floors. Internally, the principal room was the council chamber.

In the early 20th century, a single storey fire station was erected behind the council offices. The fire brigade was equipped with a horse-drawn fire engine from 1905 and with a motorised fire engine from 1912. The fire station was later augmented by a second storey, and an arched carriageway entrance was built between the council offices and the properties to the south, so as to maintain vehicle access for fire engines to their garaging behind. A memorial, in the form of a brass plaque intended to commemorate the lives of former employees of the council who had died in the First World War, was unveiled by the chairman of the council, Councillor Thomas Nixon Arkle, in October 1921.

The building continued to serve as the offices of Gosforth Urban District Council for much of the 20th century, but ceased to be the local seat of government when the enlarged Newcastle City Council was formed in 1974. It continued to serve as the local offices of the housing department of the city council until 2015, when, with the fire station, it was deemed surplus to requirements and was sold for commercial use.
