= Olga and Betty Turnbull =

Olga and Betty Turnbull were child entertainers in the 1930s. Born in Chester-le-Street, County Durham, the sisters trained at the Dorrillian Dancing Academy and performed in their first dancing display at the Church Institute, Chester-le-Street, in April 1929.

From 1930 to 1932 Olga and Betty performed in local dance shows, before touring provincial theatres across England and Scotland as the Turnbull Sisters in the mid-1930s. On 1 December 1936 they gave a special performance for the King and Queen. By May 1937 they had completed two tours of every principal town in England and Scotland and had been contracted for a third.

The sisters both joined the Women's Royal Air Force when World War II broke out, where they met their future husbands. After the war they both moved to Gosforth, Newcastle-upon-Tyne, and raised families. Betty married twice during her life and died in the 1990s, leaving a son and two daughters. Olga married Fred Canham and had two sons. She died in 1987. Neither Betty nor Olga performed professionally after the war, although the sisters formed "Gosforth Jolly Girls" in the 1960s, performing Old Time Music Hall acts at homes for the elderly.
