= Cumbria, Northumberland, Tyne and Wear NHS Foundation Trust =

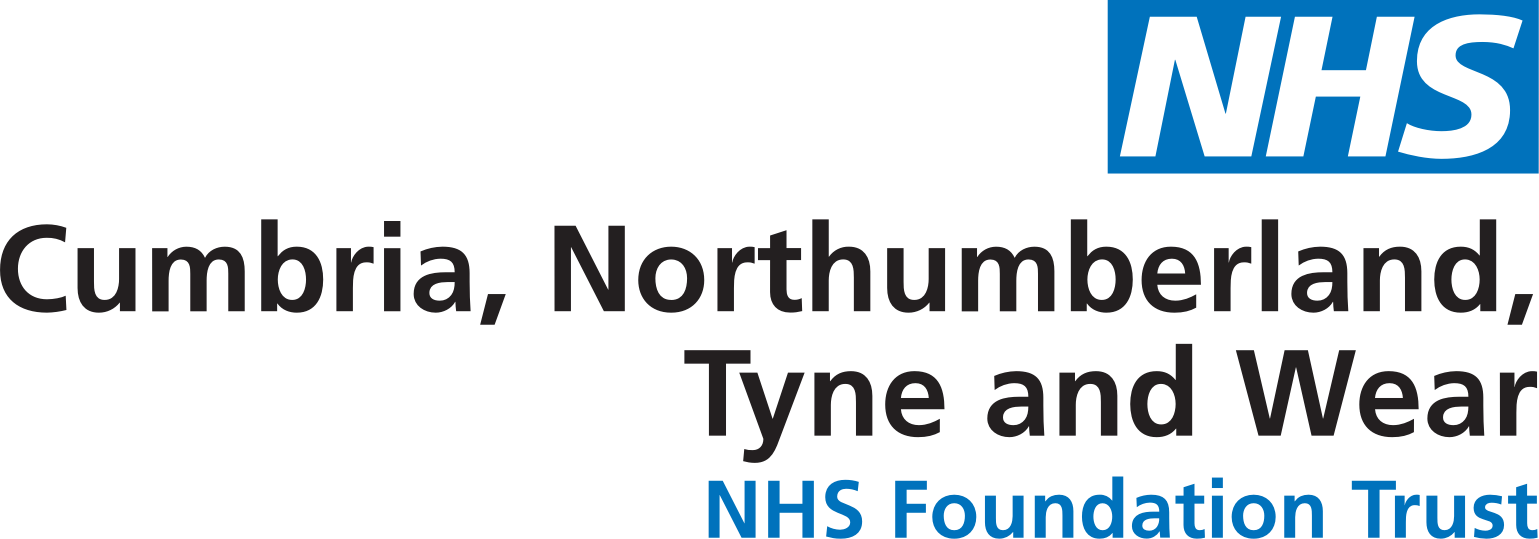
- Former name: Northumberland, Tyne and Wear NHS Foundation Trust
- Type: Mental health trust
- Established: 1 April 2006
- Headquarters: St Nicholas Hospital, Newcastle upon Tyne
- Budget: £537 million
- Chair: Darren Best
- Chief executive: James Duncan
- Staff: 9,000+
- Website: www.cntw.nhs.uk

Cumbria, Northumberland, Tyne and Wear NHS Foundation Trust is one of the largest mental health and disability Trusts in England employing more than 9,000 staff, serving a population of approximately 1.7 million, providing services across an area totalling 4,800 square miles. It works from over 70 sites across Cumbria, Northumberland, Newcastle, North Tyneside, Gateshead, South Tyneside and Sunderland. It also has a number of regional and national specialist services.

== History ==
The trust changed its name from Northumberland, Tyne and Wear NHS Foundation Trust to Cumbria, Northumberland, Tyne and Wear NHS Foundation Trust in October 2019.

== Role ==
The trust's main sites are:

- St Nicholas Hospital, Newcastle upon Tyne
- St George's Park, Morpeth, Northumberland
- Northgate, Morpeth, Northumberland
- Walkergate Park, Newcastle upon Tyne
- Monkwearmouth Hospital, Sunderland
- Carleton Clinic, Carlisle
- Hopewood Park Hospital, Ryhope, Sunderland

The trust also provide services from a number of smaller units.

In April 2018 it announced plans to establish a nursing academy in partnership with the University of Sunderland which will train up to 20 existing staff in degree level mental health and learning disability nursing apprenticeship courses.

== Finance ==
John Lawlor the chief executive warned in June 2015 that "grey to black clouds" are looming as cuts force the trust to make savings of between £9m and £12m every year because changes in NHS cash allocation had led to a shift towards distributing money on the basis of "age" rather than "deprivation".

The trust set up NTW Solutions, a subsidiary wholly owned by the trust, in March 2017. It will have 25-year lease on Monkwearmouth Hospital, Hopewood Park Hospital, Ferndene Hospital, St Nicholas' Hospital, and Northgate Hospital, employ most of the trust's 600 estates staff and manage the maintenance. It plans to save £3 million a year, about 10% of the budget of the transferred departments, through more efficient operation.

== Performance ==
It was named by the Health Service Journal as one of the top hundred NHS trusts to work for in 2015. At that time it had 5580 full-time equivalent staff and a sickness absence rate of 5.82%. 61% of staff recommend it as a place for treatment and 53% recommended it as a place to work. In August 2016 it was rated outstanding by the Care Quality Commission.

Chief executive James Duncan said it was important to "welcome" issues of abuse being highlighted after the publication of several damning reports into other mental health trusts.

== See also ==
- List of hospitals in England
- List of NHS trusts
