= St Nicholas Hospital, Newcastle upon Tyne =

St Nicholas Hospital
- Cumbria, Northumberland, Tyne and Wear NHS Foundation Trust
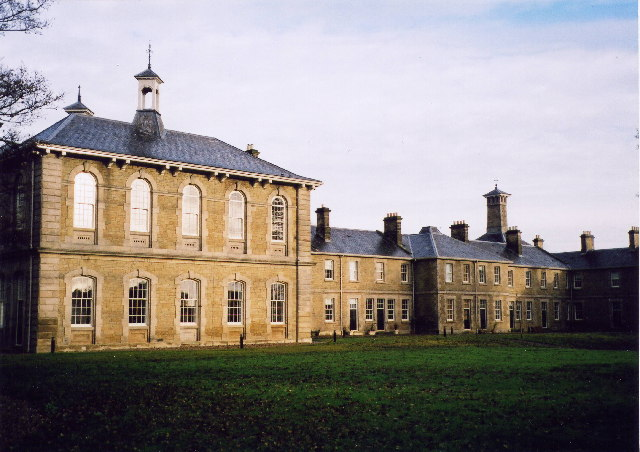
- St Nicholas Hospital

- Location in Newcastle upon Tyne Location in Tyne and Wear

Geography
- Location: Gosforth, Newcastle upon Tyne, England
- Coordinates: 55.006344°N 1.634747°W

Organisation
- Care system: NHS England
- Type: Psychiatric hospital

History
- Founded: 1864

Links
- Website: www.ntw.nhs.uk
- Lists: Hospitals in England

St Nicholas Hospital is an NHS psychiatric hospital located in Gosforth, Newcastle upon Tyne, England. The entrance is located on Jubilee Road. The buildings range from Victorian-era to modern facilities and occupy 12 hectares (30 acres) of land. The hospital is managed by Cumbria, Northumberland, Tyne and Wear NHS Foundation Trust.

== History ==
=== Early history ===
As Newcastle upon Tyne did not have a hospital of its own for mentally ill patients, a new asylum was proposed in Coxlodge, where a 50-acre (20 ha) farmstead known as Dodd's Farm was purchased. In 1864 initial plans were drawn up, and William Lambie Moffatt was appointed architect. The facility opened as Newcastle upon Tyne Borough Lunatic Asylum in July 1869 and became the Newcastle upon Tyne City Lunatic Asylum in 1882. Some of the first patients were transferred from Bensham Asylum as Durham County Magistrates had refused to renew the contract of that facility.

In 1884 permission was granted to extend the hospital, and the East and West Pavilions were completed in 1887. These allowed an additional 80 patients to be admitted. The asylum steadily grew, with more buildings erected. During the First World War the patients were evacuated and the hospital became Northumberland No. 1 War Hospital for wounded soldiers, who were brought there by train. The facility reverted to an asylum in 1921. In 1948 the National Health Service took over the hospital and changed the name to St Nicholas Hospital.

A new admissions unit called the Collingwood Clinic was opened in 1956. The site of the former Collingwood Clinic was sold in the 1990s and is now used by Virgin Money. Part of the original asylum was sold in the late 1990s and converted into housing, now known as Lanesborough Court.

In 1986 a church that had been located within the hospital grounds burned down. The area used by the church is now occupied by the 1994-built Ashgrove Nursing Home.

=== Recent history ===
Work to build an extension, the Bamburgh Clinic, on the site of a former fish factory, at a cost of £22 million started in November 2004 and was completed in April 2006. The new clinic is bordered by residential properties and a Northumberland Wildlife Trust wildlife centre and office.

In 2009 the Greentrees unit and the Lennox Ward were renovated at a cost of circa £8 million. The renovation of these Victorian hospital buildings was one of eight projects short-listed from 20 entries for the Best Design in the Community Benefit category of the Royal Institution of Chartered Surveyors North-East Renaissance Awards.

== Jubilee Theatre ==
The hospital also includes the Jubilee Theatre, a theatre which opened in 1899. Currently the theatre is primarily used by two groups: Juniper Productions (founded 1998) a drama group for sufferers of mental health difficulties, and since 1992, an external theatre company, First Act Theatre.

== Bibliography ==
- Ewing, Logan (2009). A History of St. Nicholas Hospital, Newcastle-upon-Tyne, England 1869-2001. AuthorHouse. ISBN 978-1438937540.

== See also ==
- List of hospitals in England
