= All Saints' Church, Gosforth =

Coordinates: 55.0038°N 1.6246°W

All Saints' Church, Gosforth, Newcastle upon Tyne
- Church of All Saints
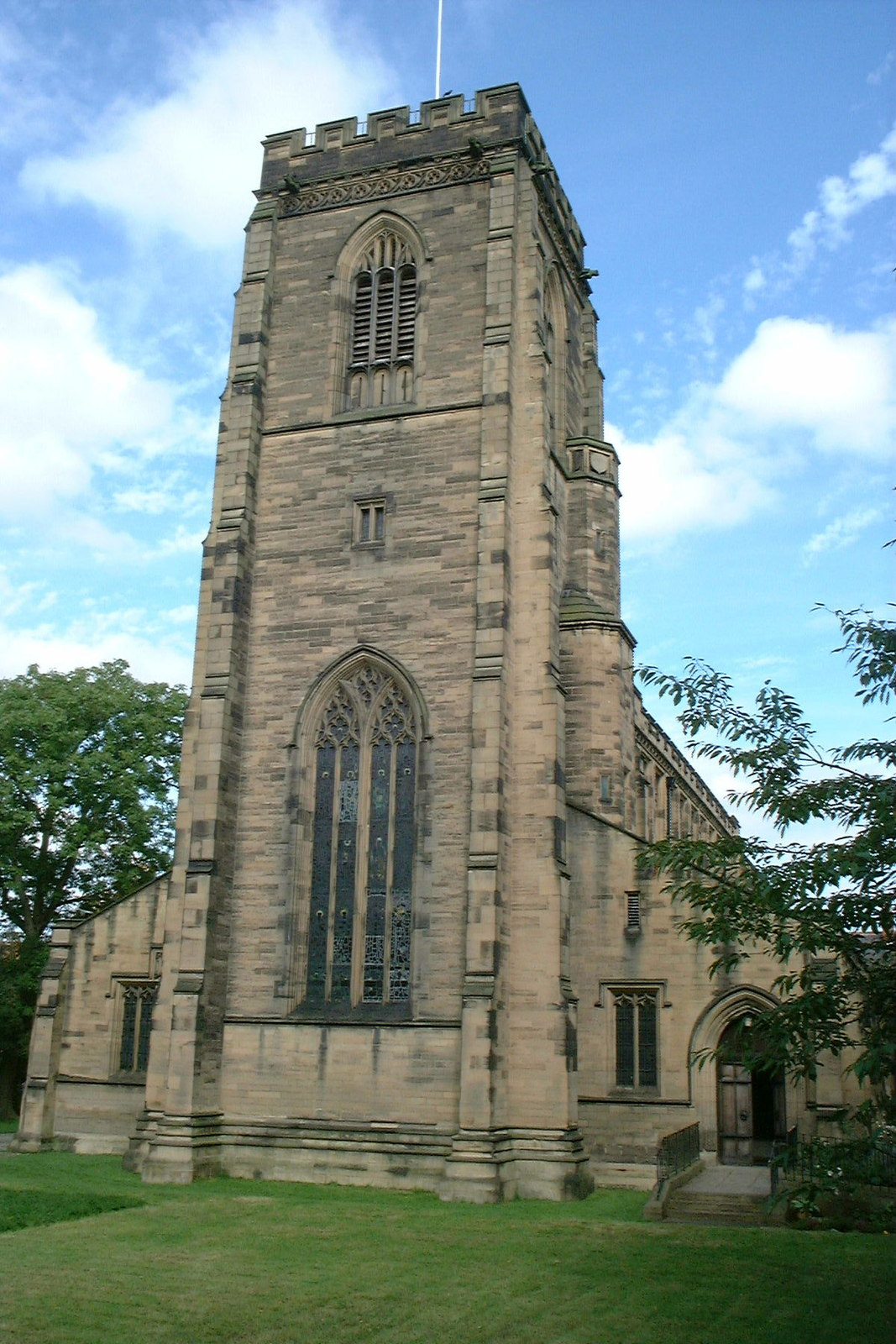
- The entrance and tower

- Location in Tyne and Wear
- Location: Gosforth, Newcastle upon Tyne
- Country: England
- Denomination: Church of England

History
- Status: Parish church
- Dedication: All Saints
- Consecrated: 1887

Architecture
- Functional status: Active
- Heritage designation: Grade II
- Designated: 10 November 1949
- Architectural type: Church
- Groundbreaking: 1885
- Completed: 1887

Administration
- Diocese: Newcastle
- Deanery: Newcastle Central
- Parish: Gosforth

Clergy
- Vicar: Revd Canon Andrew Shipton

All Saints’ Church, Gosforth is a Church of England (Anglican) parish church in the suburb of Gosforth, which lies to the north of the City of Newcastle upon Tyne. All Saints’ is part of the Diocese of Newcastle and within the Newcastle Central Deanery. It has served the community of Gosforth since being consecrated in 1887. Alongside the church building is an Edwardian church hall, a garden of remembrance and church green.

== History ==
Various historians have indicated that the parish church of St. Nicholas in South Gosforth was built on the remains of a Saxon Church and is the earliest church in the district. In 1882, the Revd Frederick Wood Bindley, the new vicar of St. Nicholas began major restoration on the church, prompting questions about the size of the parish church. In the nineteenth century the population of the original parish increased from just over a thousand to an estimated six thousand, with the development of farming, mining and trading communities to the west of the Great North Road. A committee was formed to plan the construction of a new church, and William Cochrane, a mining engineer, was appointed as honorary secretary.

The church was designed by the diocesan architect Robert J. Johnson in the Gothic Revival style and the press claimed that the people of Gosforth could now boast that they possessed "one of the finest modern churches in the north of England". The church was consecrated as All Saints on 2 October 1887. The tower is later, of 1896, and has a ring of ten bells. The interior has Victorian wood carvings by Ralph Hedley, an organ by Harrison & Harrison and stained glass windows depicting the saints throughout the ages. In later years, All Saints became the mother church of four more churches in Gosforth. The architectural historian Nikolaus Pevsner described All Saints as "a good, competent example of the large late Victorian ecclesiastical building". The church has a Grade II listing.

== Sources ==
- Pevsner, Nikolaus; Richmond, Ian (2002). Northumberland. The Buildings Of England. New Haven, US and London: Yale University Press. ISBN 978-0-300-09638-5.
