= Gosforth Central Park =

Park in Gosforth, Newcastle upon Tyne, England

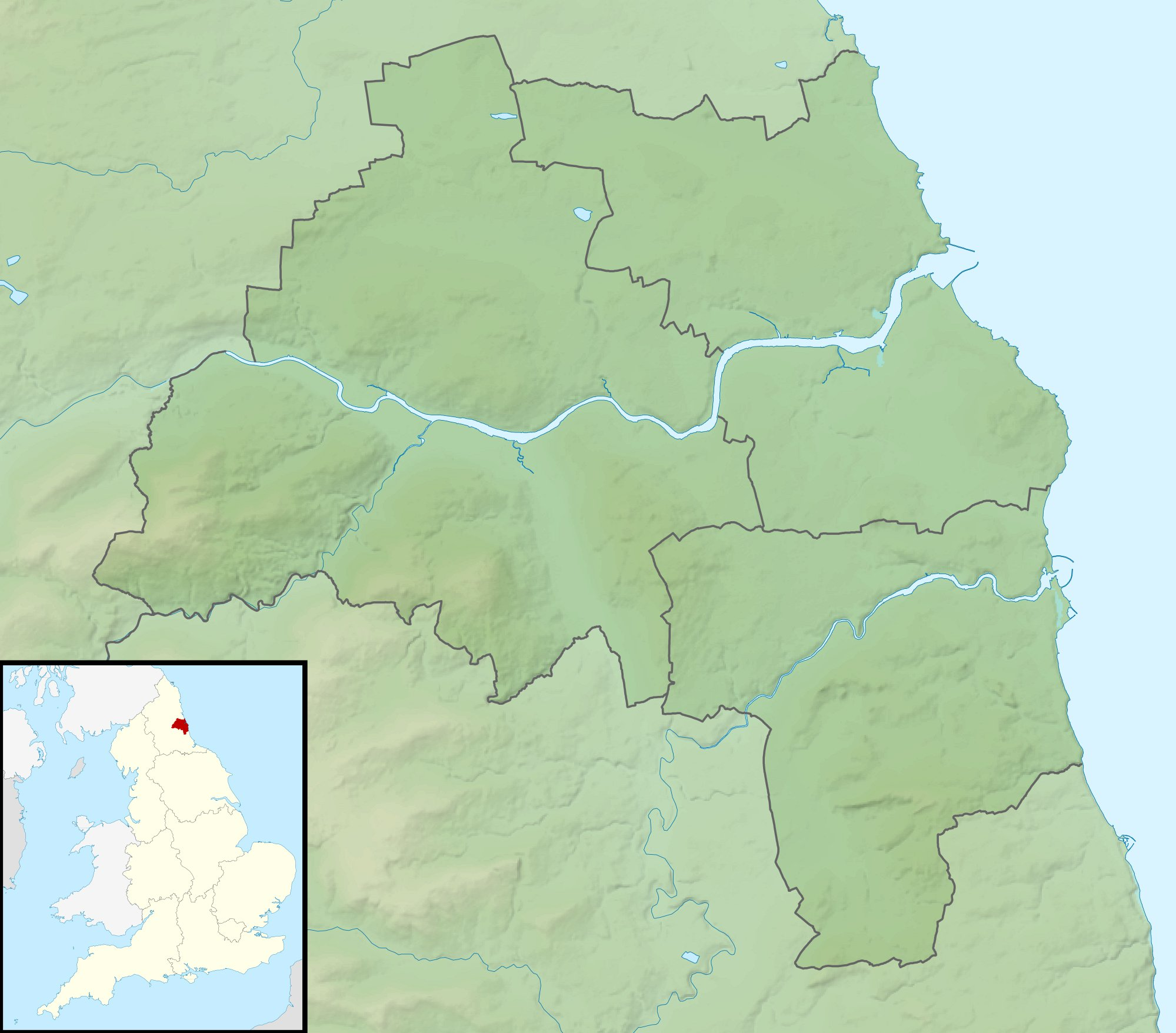
- Location within Tyne and Wear
- Type: Urban park
- Location: Gosforth
- OS grid: NZ245680
- Coordinates: 55.006°N 1.618°W
- Area: 7 acres (2.8 ha)
- Opened: 6 August 1932
- Owner: Newcastle City Council
- Operator: Urban Green Newcastle
- Open: 24 hours
- Awards: Green Flag Award
- Website: urbangreennewcastle.org/find-your-park/gosforth-central-park

Gosforth Central Park is a small public park in Gosforth, north of Newcastle City Centre, Tyne and Wear, England.

== History ==
The park was opened by Councillor C. Mossop, Chairman of Gosforth Urban District Council on 6 August 1932, and is about 7 acres (2.8 ha) in extent. It cost more than £10,000 and included a bandstand, bowling green, and tennis courts.

The south bowling green was opened by Mrs Blenkinsop, wife of the Chairman of Gosforth UDC, on 15 June 1934 and the bowling club was formed on 17 July 1934. 1 May 1937 saw the introduction of play area facilities.

The park was originally within Gosforth Urban District but is now in the Gosforth (Ward) of Newcastle upon Tyne.

== Memorials ==
The main memorial in the park is the War Memorial. The Memorial was moved from the north edge of the park to its current central location, on the site of the former bandstand. It is an octagonal column about 12 feet (3.7 m) high, and was unveiled on 28 January 1925 by the Duke of Northumberland. In April 2016 the original brick plinth was resurfaced with red sandstone.

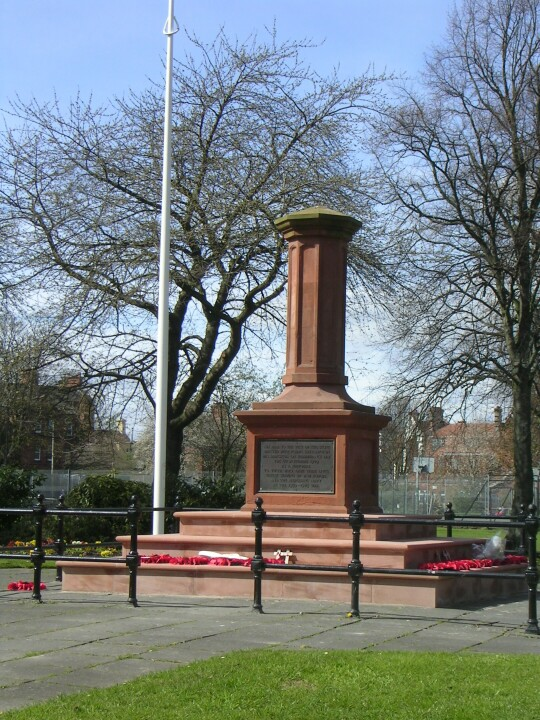
Gosforth Central Park, war memorial

== Voluntary organisations ==
=== Gosforth Central Park User Group ===
The Gosforth Central Park User Group was set up to support the Local Authority in the day-to-day management and longer-term development of the Park. The inaugural meeting took place 16 February 1993 at the suggestion of a local resident. The group is now (2013) defunct.

=== The Friends of Gosforth Central Park ===
The Friends of Gosforth Central Park was formed in 2013 for the encouragement of local participation in the promotion, management, maintenance and improvement of the Park and its facilities, including environmental conservation and education. The group has been supported by local businesses.
