= Castle Ward Rural District =

Rural district in Northumberland, England

- Area
  - 1901: 85,124 acres (344.5 km^{2})
  - 1961: 82,827 acres (335.2 km^{2})
  - Coordinates: 55.05°N 1.75°W
- Area transferred
  - 1935: 1,597 acres (6.5 km^{2}) to Newcastle upon Tyne
  - 1935: 687 acres (2.8 km^{2}) to: Gosforth Urban District and; Newburn Urban District
  - 1969: 456 acres (1.8 km^{2}) to Seaton Valley Urban District
- Population
  - 1901: 9,252
  - 1961: 24,856
- History
  - Preceded by: Castle Ward Rural Sanitary District
  - Origin: Local Government Act 1894
  - Created: 1894
  - Abolished: 31 March 1974
  - Succeeded by: Castle Morpeth; City of Newcastle upon Tyne
- Status: Rural district
- Government
  - HQ: Ponteland
  - Motto: Onward
- Contained within
  - County: Northumberland
  - Police force: Northumberland Constabulary

External image
- Coat of Arms of Castle Ward Rural District Council

Castle Ward was a rural district of the administrative county of Northumberland, England, from 1894 to 1974, covering an area north-west of the city of Newcastle upon Tyne. It was named after the historic Castle ward (one of the wards of Northumberland, a subdivision analogous to the hundred), itself named after the Castle, Newcastle. The council offices were located in Ponteland.

In 1974, under the reforms established by the Local Government Act 1972, most of the district was merged to form part of Castle Morpeth, while the southernmost part joined the metropolitan borough of Newcastle upon Tyne in the new metropolitan county of Tyne and Wear. Castle Ward, one of the modern day electoral wards of the City of Newcastle, takes its name from the district and shares some of its territory, such as in Dinnington.
