= Gosforth =

Suburb of Newcastle upon Tyne, England

Coordinates: 55.005°N 1.620°W

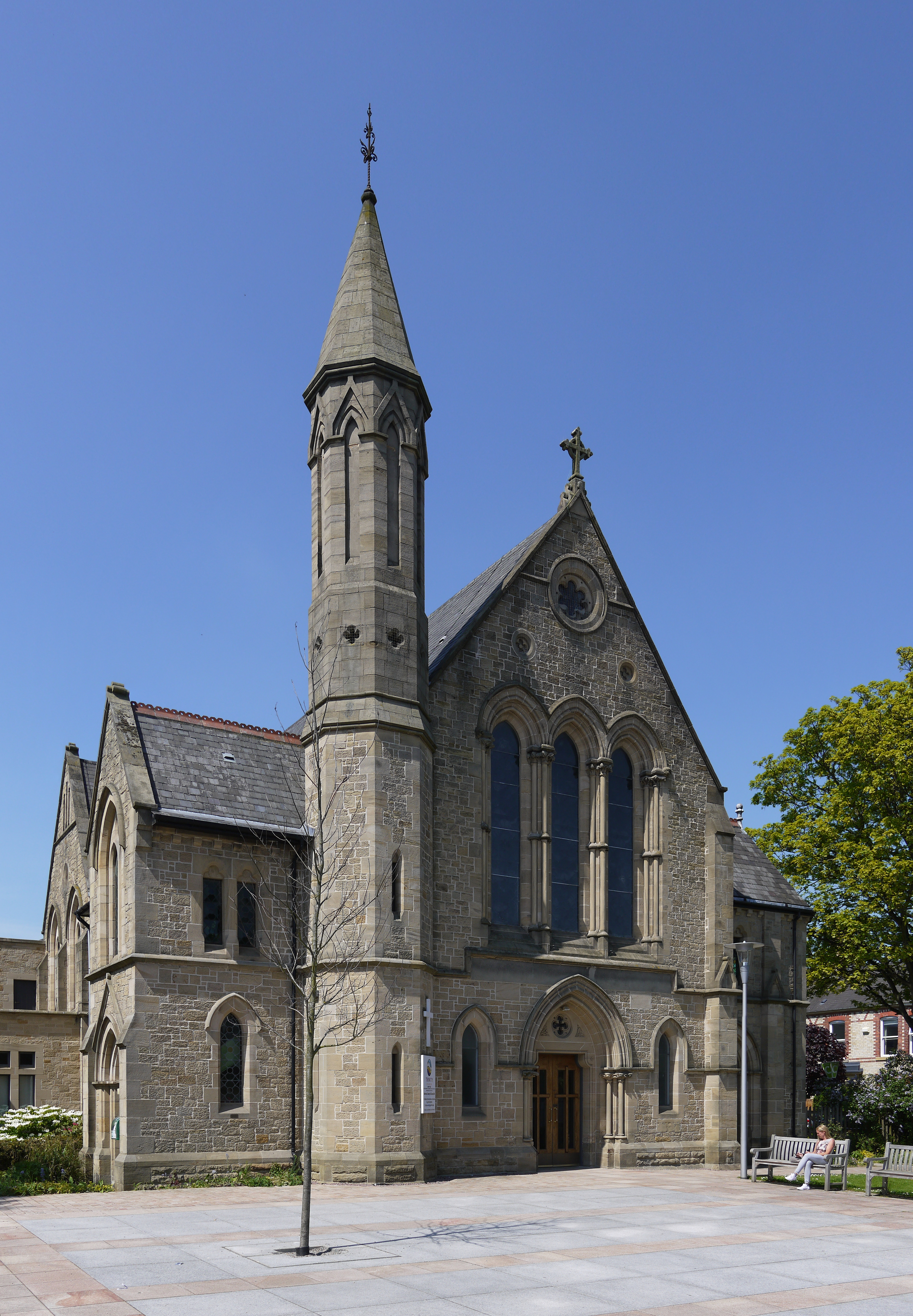
- Trinity Church on Gosforth High Street

- Location within Tyne and Wear
- Population: 23,620 (2001 census)
- OS grid reference: NZ250699
- Metropolitan borough: Newcastle upon Tyne
- Metropolitan county: Tyne and Wear
- Region: North East
- Country: England
- Sovereign state: United Kingdom
- Post town: Newcastle upon Tyne
- Postcode district: NE3, NE7
- Dialling code: 0191
- Police: Northumbria
- Fire: Tyne and Wear
- Ambulance: North East
- UK Parliament: Newcastle upon Tyne Central and West; Newcastle upon Tyne North; Newcastle upon Tyne East and Wallsend

Gosforth is an area of Newcastle upon Tyne, in Tyne and Wear, England, situated north of the city centre. It constituted a separate urban district of Northumberland from 1895 until 1974 before officially merging with the city of Newcastle upon Tyne. In 2001, it had a population of 23,620.

The Ouseburn divides Gosforth from High Heaton and Longbenton to the east, while the smaller Craghall Burn forms the boundary with Jesmond and the Town Moor to the south. Kenton and Coxlodge lie to the west. There are four electoral wards on Newcastle City Council that include parts of Gosforth: Dene and South Gosforth, Fawdon and West Gosforth, Gosforth, and Parklands.

== History ==
The origin of the area's name is thought to have come from 'Gese Ford', meaning 'the ford over the Ouse', referring to a crossing over the local River Ouse or Ouseburn. However, as it is first recorded as 'Goseford' in 1166, others think that the name originates from the Old English 'Gosaford', meaning 'a ford where the geese dwell'. Richard Welford notes that the names of North and South Gosforth come from the north and south of the River Ouse. South Gosforth was first mentioned in 1319, when it was noted that the English Army retreated there from a siege on Berwick. According to the 19th-century publication, A Topographical Dictionary of England, the township of Gosforth was held of the crown by the Surtees family from 1100 to 1509, when it passed by marriage to Robert Brandling.

=== Parishes and urban districts ===
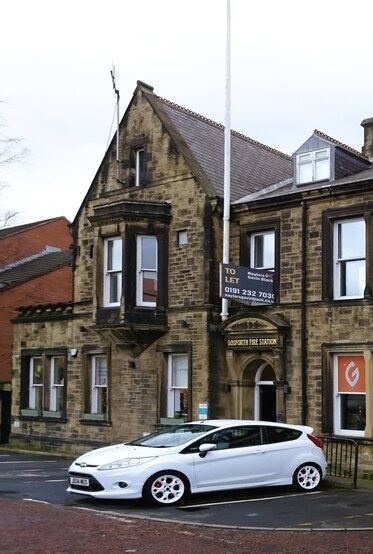
Gosforth Council Offices

In 1777, Gosforth contained seven townships of North Gosforth, South Gosforth, Coxlodge, Kenton, Fawdon, East Brunton and West Brunton. By order of the Local Government Board on 20 September 1872, the parishes of South Gosforth and Coxlodge were constituted into a district, governed by the South Gosforth Local Board. In 1894, the Local Government Board was succeeded by Gosforth Urban District Council, based at Gosforth Council Offices.

=== Mining ===
In the 19th century, Gosforth was the location of a number of collieries, including the Gosforth and Coxlodge Collieries. Gosforth Colliery was located in South Gosforth, while Coxlodge Colliery was west of the Great North Road. Coxlodge Colliery comprised three pits; the Bower Pit, the Regent or Engine Pit, where the Regent Centre now stands, and the Jubilee or North Pit further west on Jubilee Road.

=== Bulman Village ===
The modern-day centre of Gosforth, straddling the Great North Road (here called Gosforth High Street), originated in 1826 as a settlement known for several decades as Bulman Village. It originally consisted of a number of properties large enough to qualify occupiers for the franchise (so-called 'forty shilling freeholders' (£2)), built by the Bulman family in an attempt to provide voters for their cause in the 1826 elections. A stone bearing the name 'Bulman Village' survives and was incorporated in the façade of a later building, the Halifax Bank building north of the Brandling Arms public house.

The Blacksmith's Arms public house on Gosforth High Street stands on the site of the original blacksmith's forge.

=== Population ===
At the 2001 census there were 23,620 people living in Gosforth. In the 19th century Gosforth's population was largely deemed by the coal trade. In 1801 there were 1,385 inhabitants, most of whom lived in Kenton, and were employed in the colliery there. In 1831 the population had risen to 3,546, partly due to the opening of the Fawdon and Coxlodge collieries. Between 1831 and 1871 the population only grew by a very small amount to 3,723, due to the pits at Fawdon and Kenton having ceased to function.

=== Archaeological finds ===
There have been a number of archaeological finds in Gosforth, with the earliest piece being a prehistoric flint flake that was found in 1959. In 1863 a 2nd-century Greek Colonial coin was found in a garden in Bulman Village. A Roman altar was found in North Gosforth.

== Landmarks ==
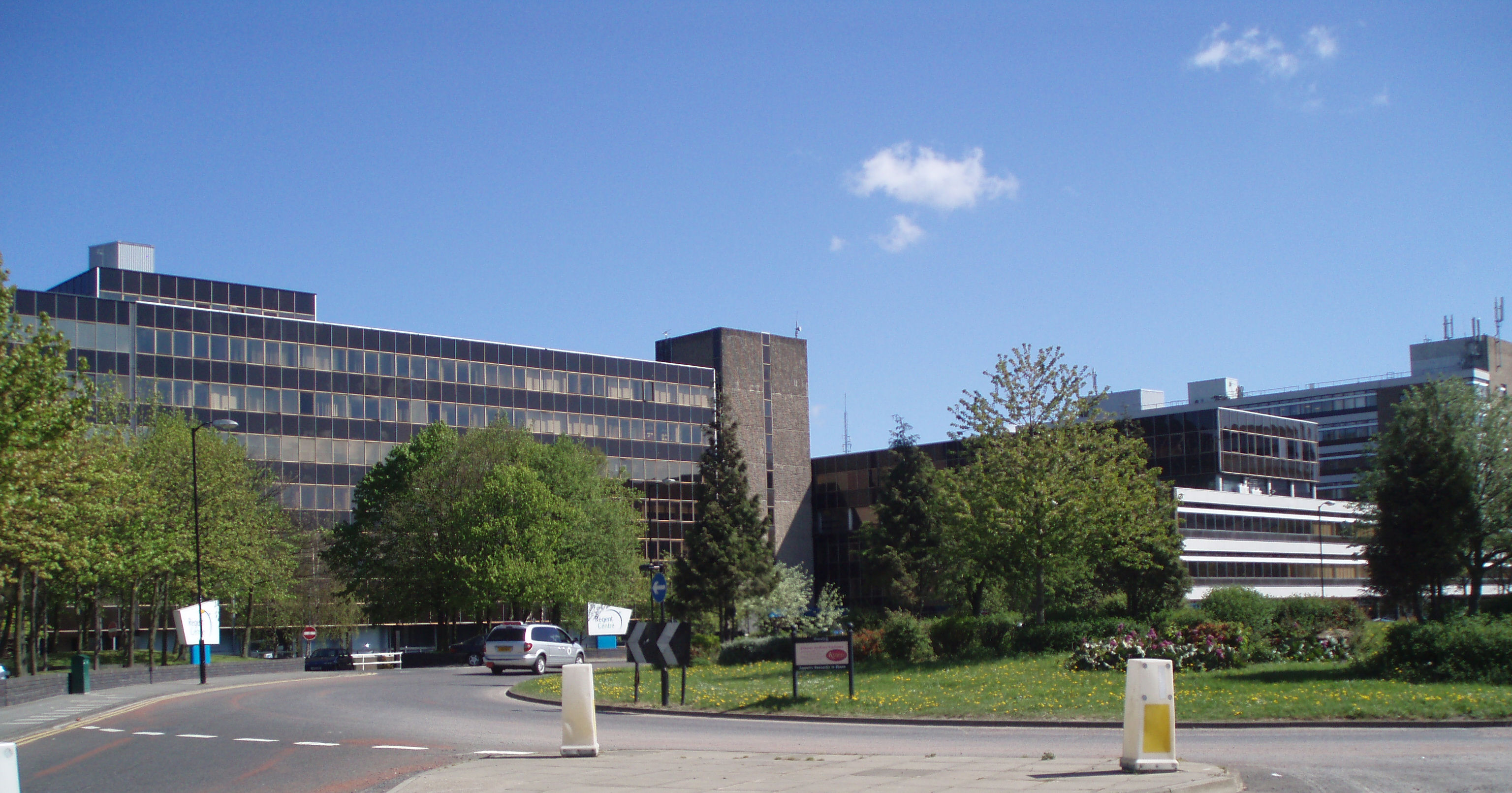
Some of the Regent Centre buildings

Gosforth has a large business complex called the Regent Centre. Gosforth's main high school is Gosforth Academy, and some of the private schools in Gosforth are Westfield School (for girls) and Newcastle School for Boys. St Nicholas Hospital is also located in Gosforth, which houses the Jubilee Theatre, a Victorian Theatre built in 1899.

== Areas of Gosforth ==
Apart from South Gosforth, many residential districts of Gosforth are suffixed "Park". There is Bridge Park, Brunton Park, Gosforth Park (including Newcastle Racecourse), Grange Park, Greystoke Park, Grove Park, Kingston Park, Melton Park, Newcastle Great Park, and Whitebridge Park. There are also two housing estates called Warkworth Woods and Melbury Park. East of the Great North Road, Garden Village was developed on 'garden suburb' lines in the 1920s to house workers at the nearby London & North Eastern Railway electric train depot (now the Tyne & Wear Metro depot).

Areas of Gosforth have been used as a filming locations for television shows and films. Gosforth Park was used as a location in 1971's Get Carter and Whitebridge Park which was used in an episode of Wire in the Blood. Melton Park has the ruins of a chapel which dates back to early medieval or late Norman times.

Brunton Park is a neighbouring estate to the Newcastle Great Park. The oldest parts in the estate have existed since the early 1930s. The rest of the estate was built during the 1940s and 1950s. It contains a number of local convenience shops. One of the newest expansions of the city is called Newcastle Great Park in the very north of Newcastle.

== Sports and entertainment ==
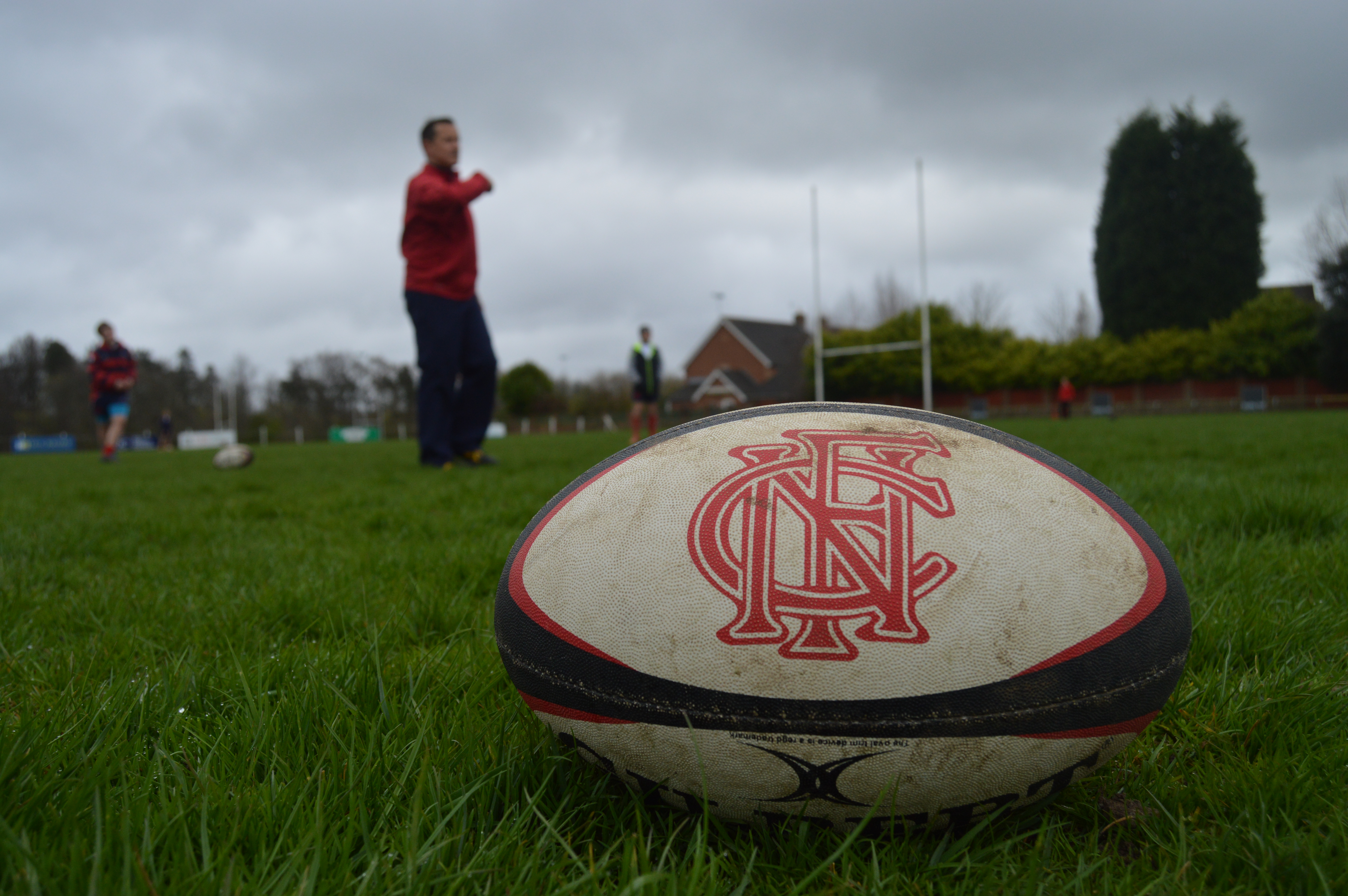
Northern Football Club play rugby union at McCracken Park

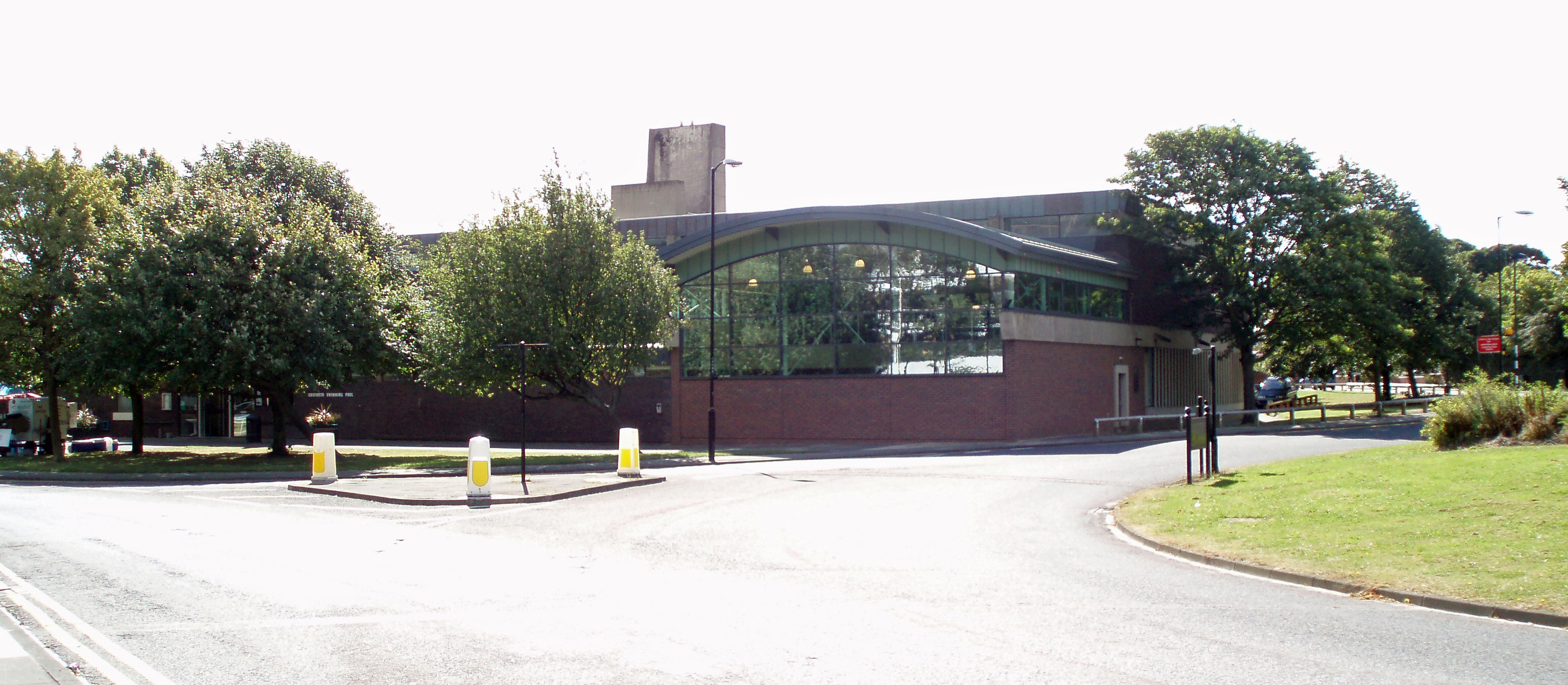
Gosforth Swimming Pool

Gosforth has sports facilities such as Gosforth Swimming Pool. Famous sportsmen from Gosforth include footballer Alan Shearer and athlete Jonathan Edwards. The swimming pool was given a slight revamp during early 2011. Newcastle Racecourse is based in Gosforth Park.

Gosforth has had a long connection with local rugby football, currently being home to Newcastle's oldest rugby club, Northern Football Club (founded 1875). Northern's home is McCracken Park located on the Great North Road. Also nearby is namesake of the current incarnation of the Gosforth Rugby Club (originally formed in 1877). The city's rugby club, the Newcastle Falcons, was also originally based in Gosforth, also originally being called Gosforth Rugby Club, and later Newcastle Gosforth. Gosforth Central Park has two bowling greens (one now used as a public 'quiet area') with a women's and a men's club, two tennis courts, a basketball court and a fenced playground area.

Gosforth has a number of golf courses including the City of Newcastle Golf Club, High Gosforth Golf Course and Gosforth Golf Course, which is a 90-acre (360,000 m^{2}) golf course that opened in 1906. Gosforth has been home to the South Northumberland Cricket Club since 1892, which is home itself to the South North Bulls team.

Gosforth formerly had two cinemas, the Royalty Cinema on the high street and the Globe Cinema on Salters Road. The Royalty Cinema opened on 17 October 1934 and closed on 30 December 1981. A video documentary, Last Reel at the Royalty, viewable online was produced about the cinema's history. The Globe Cinema later became a bingo hall and is now Poon's Gosforth Palace Chinese restaurant.

The ground on which the Asda supermarket stands was formerly the Gosforth Greyhound Stadium until the late 1980s and the home of Northumberland RFU. The stadium had also previously been a Speedway Track from 1929 to 1930.

== Economy ==
=== Businesses ===
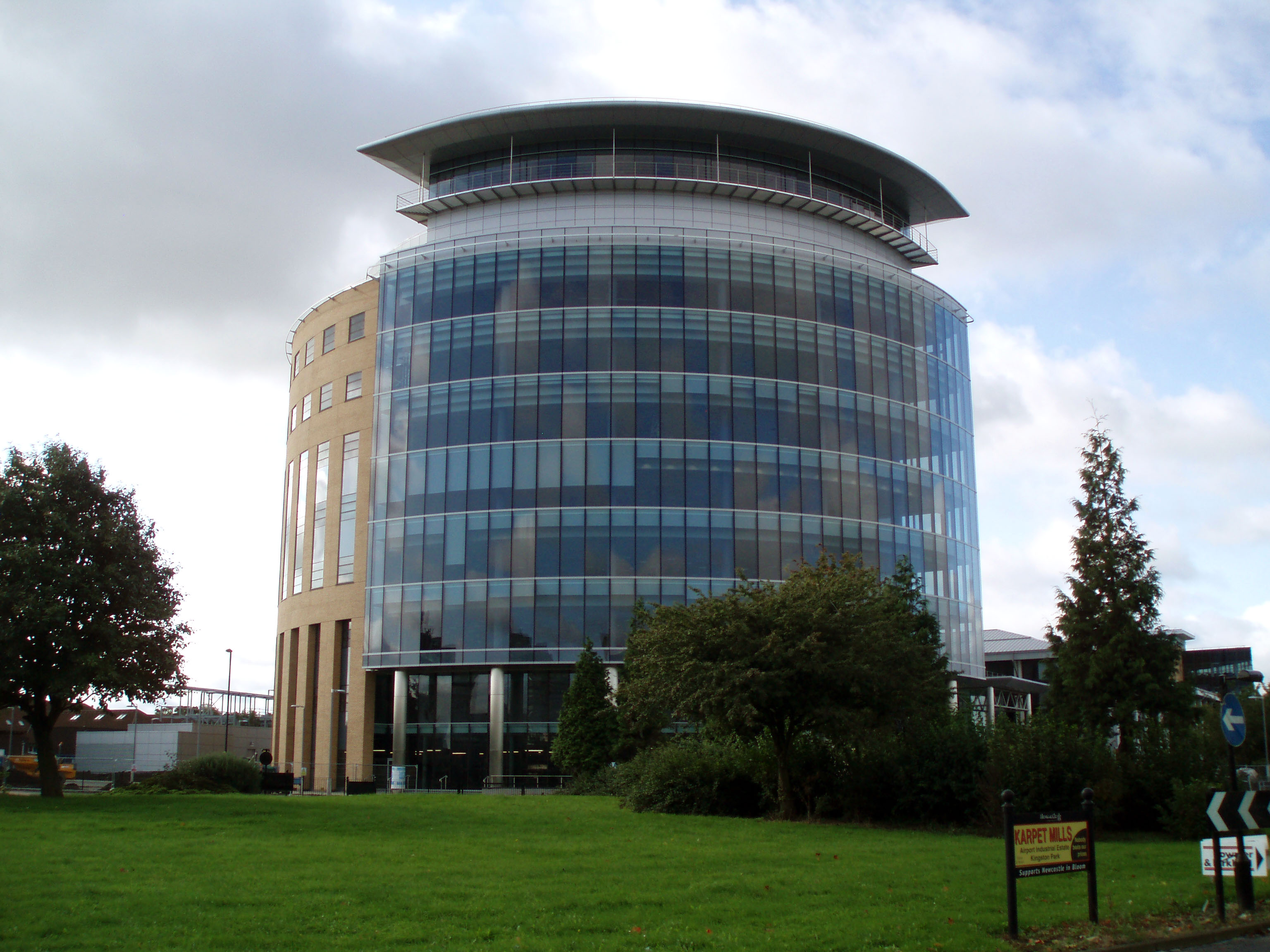
Partnership House, originally intended as the new headquarters of Northern Rock prior to its collapse, now primarily used by Clifford Chance

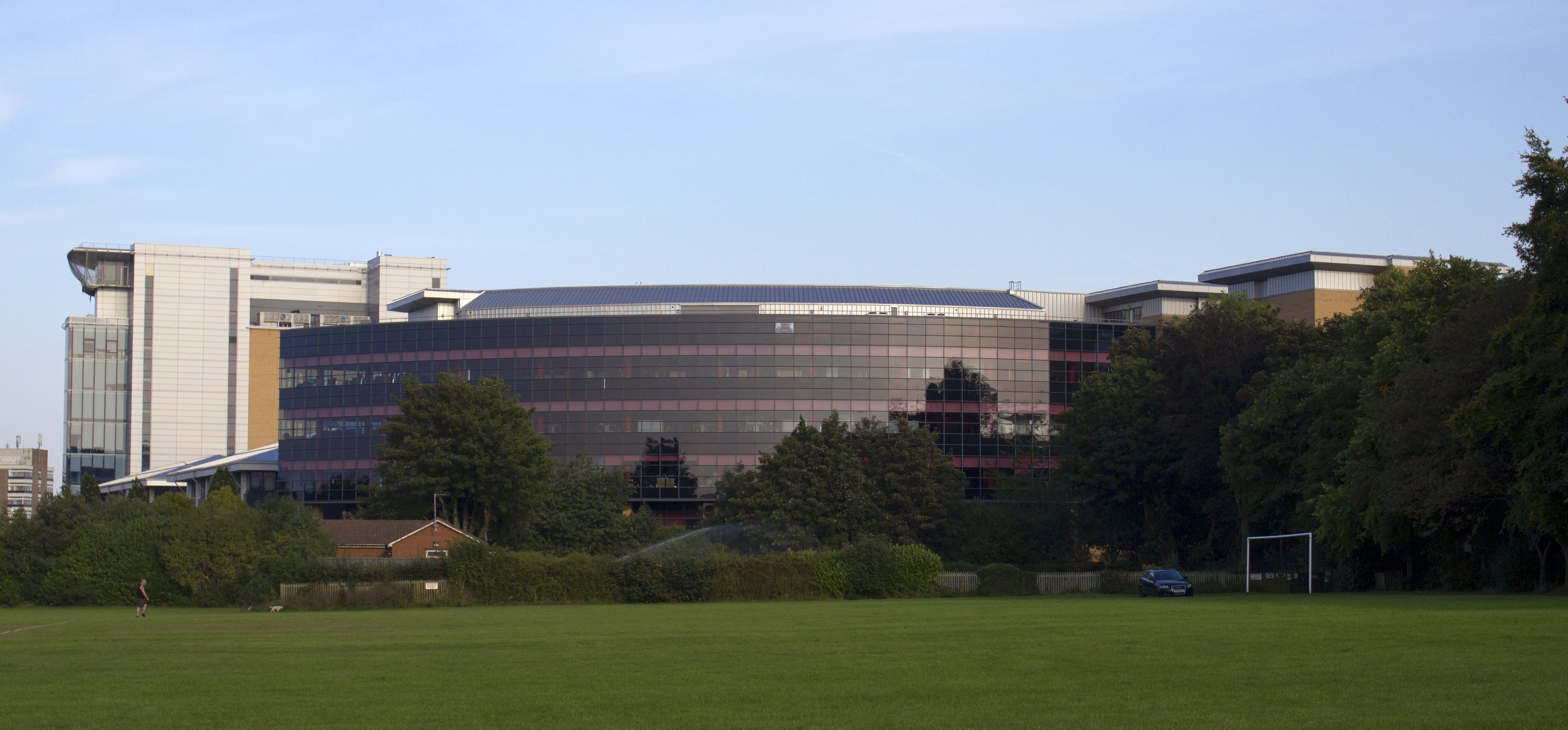
Virgin Money savings and mortgages business headquarters, formerly Northern Rock

Many businesses have offices in the Regent Centre complex, near the High Street, as well as other business parks including Gosforth Industrial Estate, located near the Metro train sheds, and Gosforth Business Park, located between Gosforth Park and nearby Longbenton.

Gosforth houses Jubilee House, the headquarters of the savings and mortgages business of Virgin Money. The building was previously known as Northern Rock House, however in 2008 Northern Rock faced huge difficulties in the subprime mortgage crisis and was nationalised. Virgin Money bought Northern Rock from the British Government in 2012 and promised not to make any of the former Northern Rock employees redundant.

Northern Rock had a landmark tower building, built in the 1960s, which in the 2000s was replaced with a 10-storey office building; Partnership House, as it is now known since being sold by the bank, now houses companies including law firm Clifford Chance and video games developer Ubisoft Reflections. Other resident companies of Regent Centre include the National Health Service (NHS).

Greggs, the largest national retail bakery, originally started with John Gregg's single shop on Gosforth High Street in 1951; initially Greggs was known as Greggs of Gosforth. In 1968 Greggs opened their first large-scale bakery on the Gosforth Industrial Estate, but in 2011 moved to a £16.5 million site in Gosforth Business Park on Gosforth Park Way. In 2012 the Greggs on the high street was given a concept makeover depicting their 'Greggs the Bakery' format.

Procter & Gamble formerly had their UK head office in Newcastle. Hedley House, Gosforth, was developed in the 1950s. The principal building in this complex, Hedley House itself (c. 1953) was designed by Sidney Burn, staff architect to Thos. Hedley & Co., soap manufacturers, in association with consultant architect Anthony Chitty. In 1963/64 an addition to the site included a computer block by Basil Spence (1963/64). The landscape setting was designed by B. Hackett. The 1994 extension to the site (now demolished) won the 1994 new building category in the Lord Mayor's Design Awards. Procter & Gamble left the site in 2001 to move to Cobalt Business Park, near the eastern city boundary with North Tyneside, and the Gosforth land is now used for residential properties.

The Sage Group had its headquarters in Newcastle Great Park (in an office complex called "North Park"); another office complex called Esh Plaza is also located in Newcastle Great Park. In 2004 Sage moved its headquarters to this location from a site near Haddricks Mill Roundabout, and moved again to Cobalt Park in 2021.

=== Commerce ===
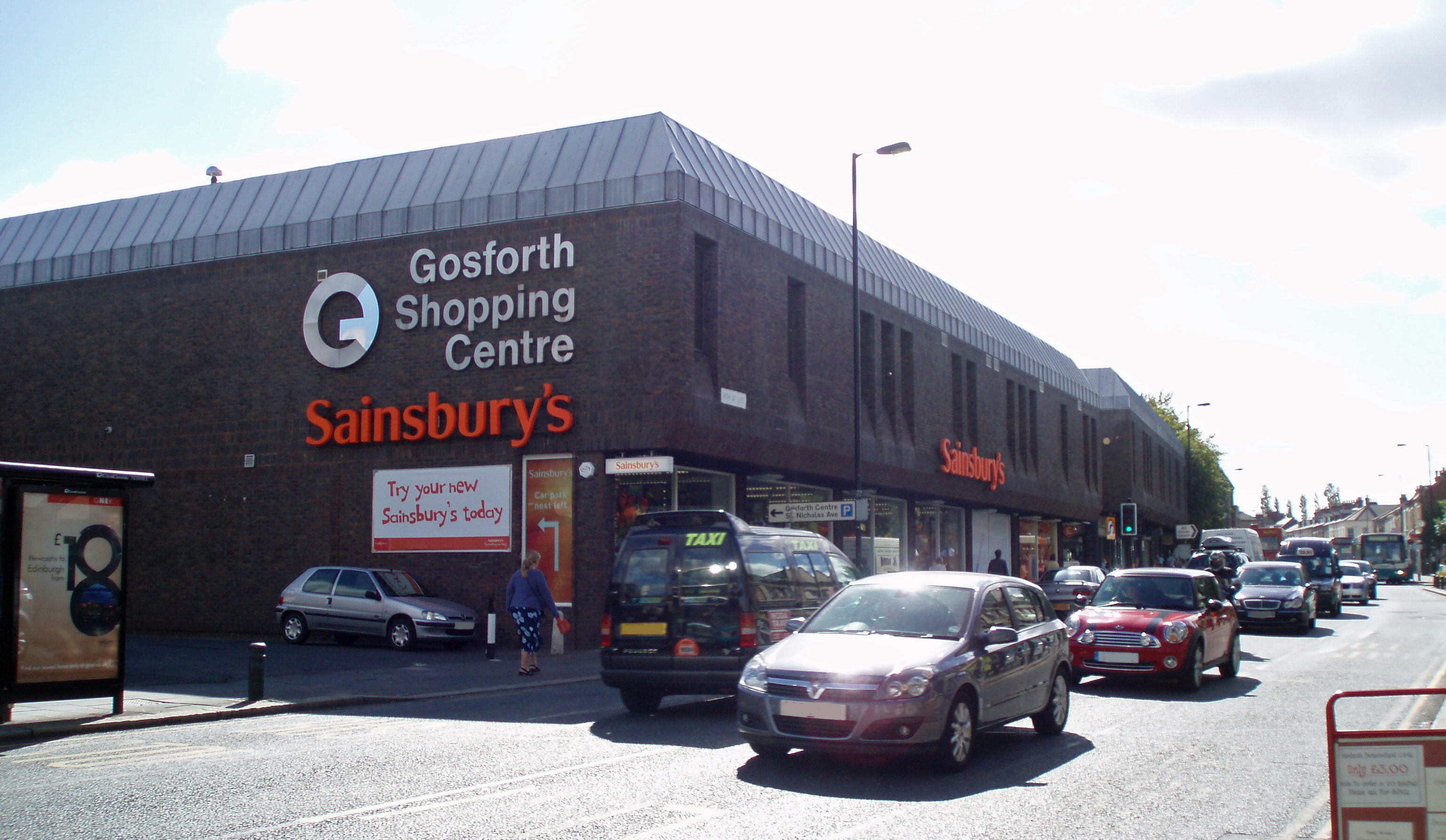
Gosforth Shopping Centre, showing Sainsbury's at left. There is a car park on the roof.

Gosforth High Street has been home to local shops for over a hundred years. In 1979 the Gosforth Shopping Centre opened on the High Street and connects to Gosforth Central Park; shops here include a Sainsbury's and a WHSmith. There is also a branch of Virgin Money and a Cancer Research charity shop. The park was created on the site of a former nursery for £10,000 and opened on 6 August 1932. A theatre stood on part of the site of the Gosforth Shopping Centre. The stage faced the park and a huge door could be opened to entertain an outdoor audience. The theatre was damaged in a fire shortly before the Shopping Centre was built.

Many shops have come and gone from Gosforth High Street over the years, including familiar names such as: Robinson's Pet Shop which was near Elmfield Road; Boydell's Toys on the corner of Hawthorn Road; Maynard's sweet shop, the Toddle Inn Cafe and Laidlaw's hardware and decorating store – all of which were situated opposite the junction with St Nicholas Avenue; and Moods – a stationery and gift shop – which stood where the Gosforth Centre is now, opposite Ivy Road.

The high street had a Woolworths store, which closed on 3 January 2009, due to the company being in administration. On 10 December the former Woolworths store reopened as a Co-operative Food store, after plans to change the store into an Italian restaurant were rejected. The branch closed in 2016, being replaced with a McColls convenience store, which has also now closed.

The car park on the corner of the high street and Salters Road is the former site of a primary school.

Gosforth Shopping Centre is owned by Drum who purchased it in 2016 for £12.25 million. Its previous owner for more than a decade was Graham Wylie, co-founder of the Sage Group, which itself was headquartered just outside Gosforth in the North Park development, who had bought it for £9.25 million.

=== Public houses ===
The Brandling Arms pub on the high street has its own local edition of My Monopoly, using Gosforth locations. Other pubs on Gosforth High Street are the Gosforth Hotel (built 1878), the Queen Victoria (known for a short time as Northern Lights), the Blacksmith's Arms, Barca (formally Earl Grey) and the Job Bulman, a branch of Wetherspoons located in the former 1920s post office building on St Nicholas Avenue, and named after the founder of Bulman Village.

== Transport, communication and amenities ==
=== Transport ===
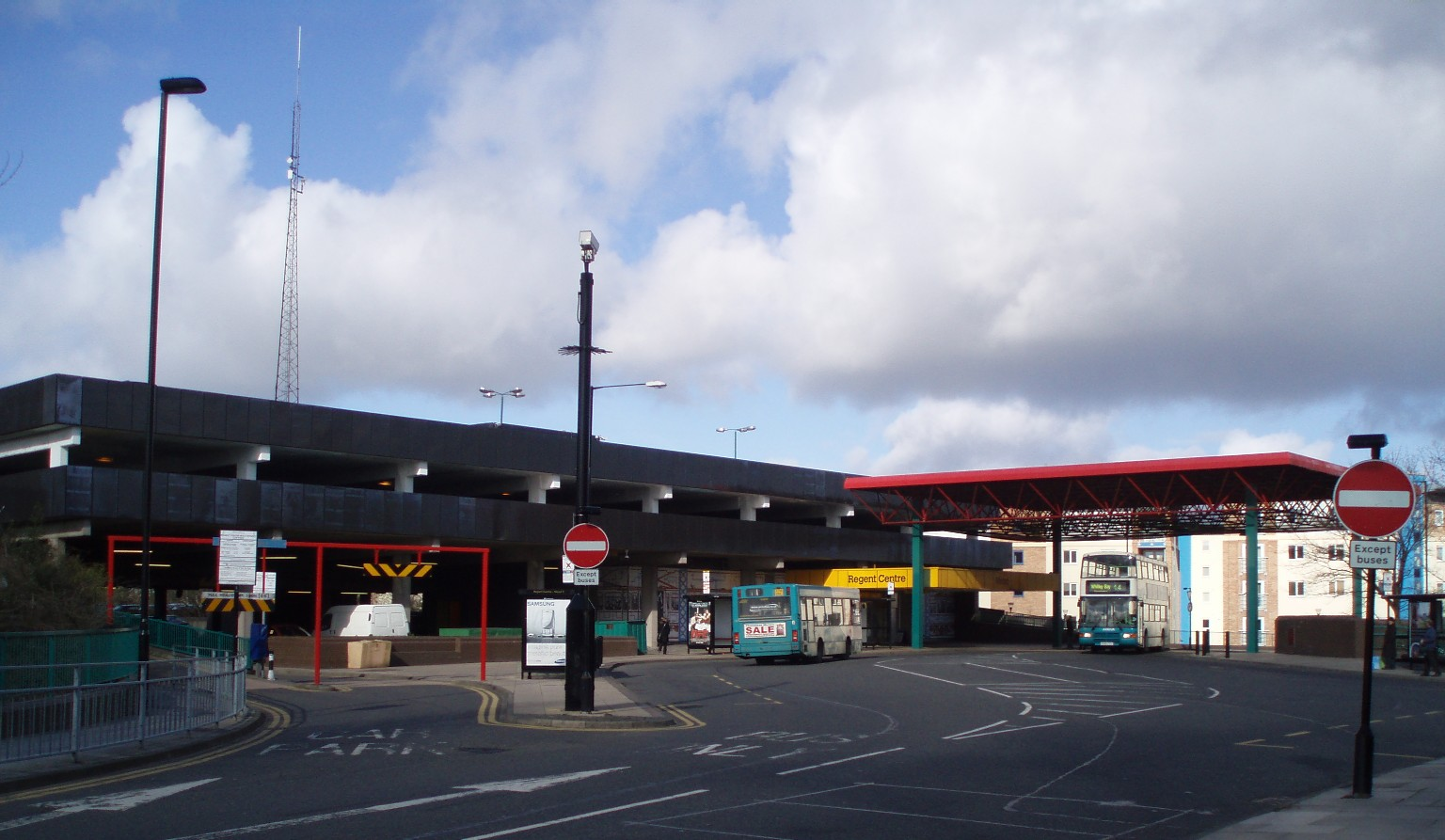
Regent Centre Interchange

Gosforth is served by three Tyne & Wear Metro stations: South Gosforth, Regent Centre, Wansbeck Road. The control centre for the Metro system is located at South Gosforth station, and the main depot and car sheds are nearby. Regent Centre's Transport Interchange also contains a large bus station and multi-storey car park.

In 1902, Gosforth was linked by tramway to Wallsend, then Newcastle a year later; this tramway has long since been removed as other travel links evolved. The Gosforth Park Light Railway extended the tramlines from the High Street to the gates of Gosforth Park; this service ceased in 1930. In the late 1850s, prior to horse trams, a resident by the name of Mark Frater established an omnibus service connecting Gosforth and Newcastle.

In 1864, Gosforth was connected to the Blyth and Tyne Railway. In 1905 the Ponteland Railway was opened from Gosforth to Ponteland. Three stations in Gosforth were on this route, South Gosforth (the 1864 station renamed), West Gosforth and Coxlodge. With the opening of the Metro system in the 1980s the locations of these stations were used for the modern South Gosforth, Regent Centre and Fawdon stations respectively.

In 2009 Newcastle City Council agreed to £9.6 million worth of plans to revamp roads around Gosforth, including the High Street and the Great North Road. With the proposed improvements there would be up to 13 months of roadworks, starting in 2012. The High Street is to have bus lanes, and other traffic is to be confined to one lane in each direction. The city council aims to get 90% of the funding for the congestion improvements from the Department for Transport.

=== Communications ===
NE3 is the postcode area for Gosforth and BT landlines start with (0191) 213, 217, 223, 226, 236, 255, 279, 284 and 285.

Cable, provided by Virgin Media, does not fully cover Gosforth. For example, it is not available to homes covered by the Wideopen Telephone Exchange in the north of the suburb, or in Garden Village to the east of the Asda superstore, or the Regent Farm area. ADSL and ADSL2+ are widely available in Gosforth, and BT Infinity broadband was activated in 2011. Gosforth was a pilot area for the G.fast DSL technology in 2015. As of 2021, CityFibre has been installing Gigabit broadband in the area.

=== Amenities ===
In the late 19th century a volunteer fire brigade was started in Gosforth, later in 1894 a fire station was built on Gosforth High Street and since 1990 Gosforth has been served by Gosforth Community Fire Station, located on Jubilee Road. Gosforth's first police station opened in 1857, with four policemen, due to the County and Borough Police Act 1856 (19 & 20 Vict. c. 69). Its last police station, on Hawthorn Road, closed in the 1990s and Gosforth is now served from Etal Lane Police Station.

Gosforth has a number of post offices, however on 1 July 2008 the Post Office announced the next set of post offices which would close; the Gosforth Garden Village branch and a nearby branch in Kenton closed. A public meeting was held about the closure of the Garden Village post office on the evening of 28 July. Postal facilities had first been introduced in Gosforth in around 1840.

Whilst the fire brigade was stationed in Gosforth there was a siren that used to alert motorists and public alike that they would be leaving the hidden entrance. The alert was the original 'all clear' siren from Second World War.

An unattended mortuary was situated in what was at one time quite an isolated rural spot to the east of Three Mile Bridge. This small single-storey red-brick building with green doors was surrounded by trees and a crooked metal fence and was used for people who had died from infectious diseases or had been killed in road traffic accidents. Residents of nearby Burnside Road (built in the late 1950s) would hear ambulances pass down the lane in the middle of the night and see undertakers arrive to collect bodies during the day. This continued into the 1960s. When a housing estate was built in the 1980s, the site of the mortuary was not built on and is currently a small car parking area.

Sanderson Hospital, an orthopaedic hospital, operated in Gosforth between 1897 and 2005. In 2021, new houses are being built on the site on Salters Road.

=== Gosforth Library ===
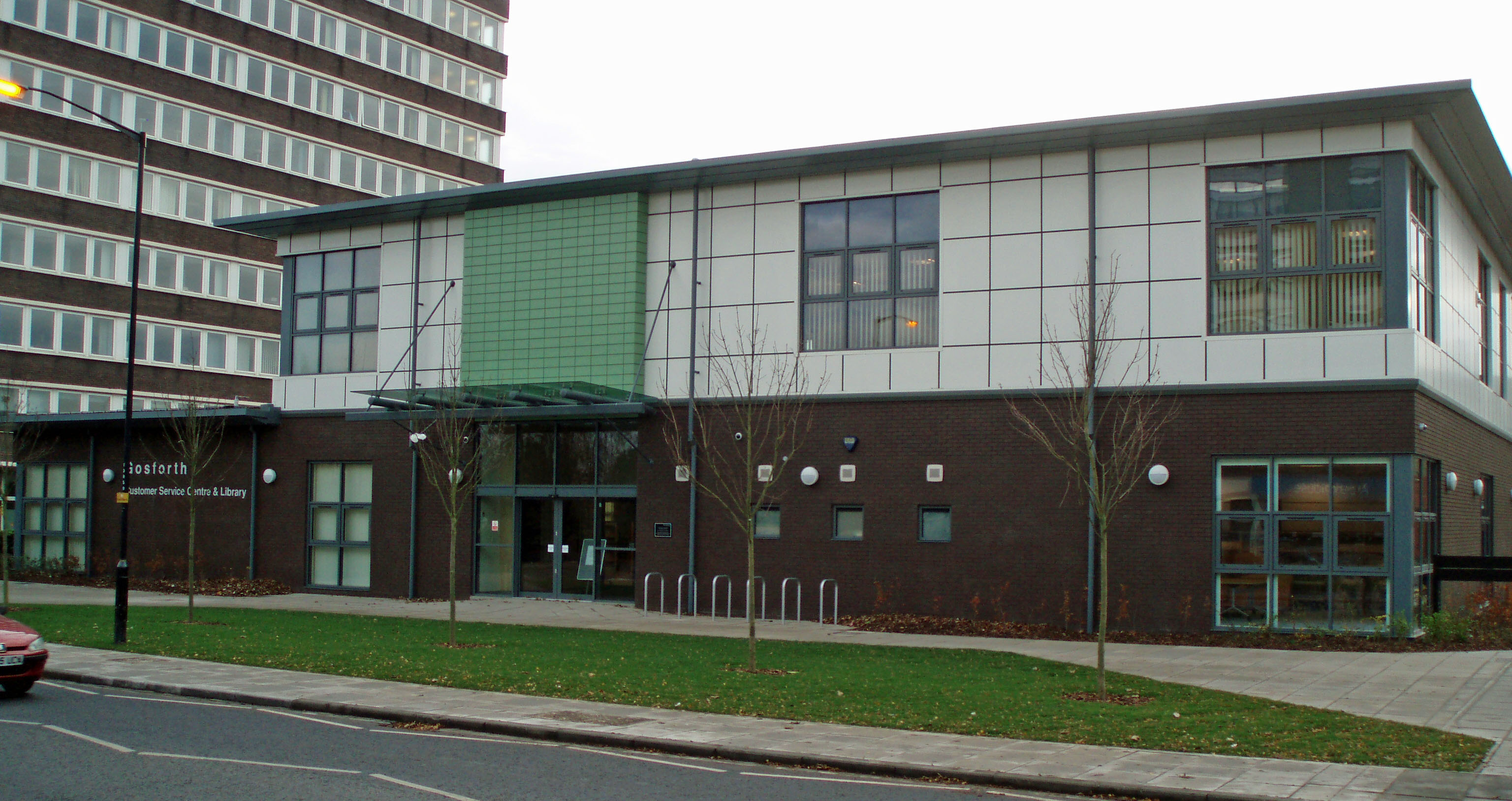
The new Gosforth Library

Gosforth has a public library which was re-built in 2007. In November 2006, the old Gosforth Library was closed and moved to a nearby temporary location. The single-storey building was subsequently demolished and has been replaced by a new two-storey building. The new library and customer service centre, costing £2.8 million opened on 17 December 2007. The library was officially opened on 8 February 2008 by John Grundy, a local television presenter; music pupils from the then Gosforth High School also performed at the opening.

In 2014 the customer service centre closed and the space is now occupied by part of Newcastle City Learning. The new building will also incorporate 'public art' to give the centre an identity and a connection with the local area. The library is also used as a polling station.

=== Gosforth Civic Hall ===
The current civic hall in Gosforth is on Regent Farm Road and was built in the 1970s as a replacement for the old Central Hall on the high street. A Second World War plaque is located in the hall. As of 2011 the hall was not regularly used and the council were looking at other potential community uses for the building. In 2014 a competitive process to determine the operator of the hall was held. This was won by Liberdade Community Development Trust, and the building is now used as a community theatre.

== Education ==
=== Primary schools ===
- St. Charles' RC Primary School
- St. Oswald's RC Primary School
- Wyndham Primary School

=== First schools ===
- Archbishop Runcie CE First School
- Archibald First School
- Gosforth Park First School
- Grange First School
- Regent Farm First School
- South Gosforth First School

=== Middle schools ===
- Gosforth Central Middle School
- Gosforth East Middle School
- Gosforth Junior High Academy (formerly Gosforth West Middle School)

=== High schools ===
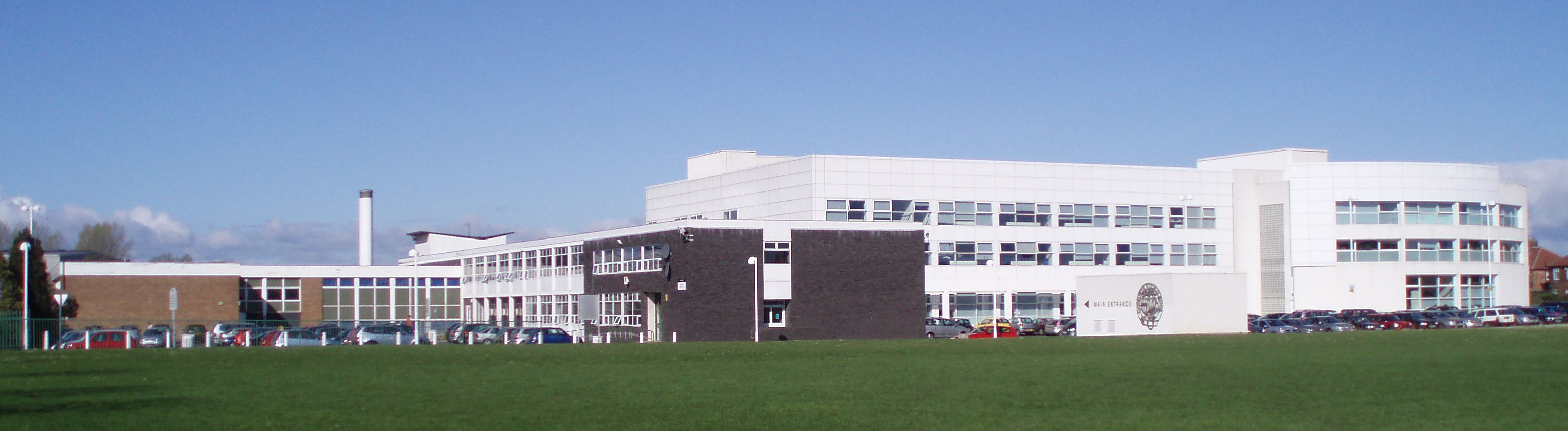
Gosforth Academy in 2007

- Gosforth Academy (formerly Gosforth High School / Gosforth Grammar School)

=== Independent schools ===
- Newcastle School for Boys
- Westfield School (for girls)

=== Sixth form colleges ===
- Gosforth Academy Sixth Form College

=== Adult education ===
- Gosforth Community Education College

== Religious sites ==
- Parish church. The church is dedicated to St. Nicholas and was built in 1799 to the design of John Dodds, replacing an earlier medieval church building which like many parish churches had been built on top of a hill. The architect John Dobson was responsible for some alterations to the church in 1818–20. The eastern half was added in 1913, to the designs of Hicks and Charlewood. A new vestry was added in 1959, partly as a war memorial, designed by F.W. Harvey. The church's predecessor was mentioned in 1170, when the advowson changed hands. In 1220 Gosforth was also mentioned, according to Brand's History of Newcastle. The earliest parish register is dated 1697.
- St Charles' (Roman Catholic) . The parish of St. Charles' came into being at Coxlodge in 1861. The land on which the church now stands in Gosforth was donated by George Dunn Jnr. in 1896. An iron church was opened on 20 December 1896. It measured 25½ yards by 10 yards. Building of the current church began with the blessing and laying of a foundation stone by the Right Rev. Richard Collins, Bishop of Hexham and Newcastle, on 14 August 1910, and the new church was dedicated in 1911. The solemn opening was a Pontifical High Mass celebrated by Bishop Collins on 3 December 1911. In 2003, work commenced on the construction of a new parish centre on the land adjacent to the church on the north side, formerly occupied by the original St. Charles' Primary School, and this was officially opened in September 2004 by Canon Bob Spence.
- All Saints' Church, West Avenue. The church was designed by the Diocesan Architect, Mr. Robert J. Johnson. Building work at the church commenced in 1855, and the prominent west tower was added in 1896. All Saints' Church was consecrated on 2 October 1887 and is a fine example of Gothic Revival architecture. The tower of the church houses ten bells and it is surmounted by a battlement and flagstaff.
- Trinity Church. This church was formed from an amalgamation of three non-conformist chapels on the west side of Gosforth High Street. The building was formerly known as West Avenue Methodist Church.
- Gosforth Presbyterian Church. This church has been amalgamated into Trinity Church. The premises were occupied by a Loch Fyne restaurant which closed in July 2018; planning permission was granted for it to re-open as a bar, and it now trades under the name Barluga.
- Woodbine Road Primitive Methodist. This church has been amalgamated into Trinity Church. The premises are now occupied by the Community Foundation, having previously been used by the Northern Rock Foundation.
- South Gosforth Methodist Church was on Freeman Road near the Freeman Hospital. It is now Trinity Christian Community Centre, administered by Trinity Church, Gosforth.
- Regent Chapel. In 1938 a group of Christian families living in the Gosforth area felt the need for a Bible-based church for weekly services. The church was able to rent premises above the Co-operative Society on the Great North Road in Gosforth, and the new church began to meet there and take shape. In 1960, the present site in Regent Farm Road became available and with some imaginative planning a new building which cost £7,500 was built on the site.
- United Hebrew Congregation Synagogue. The synagogue on Graham Park Road was in use from 1986 to 2019.

== Notable people ==
=== Born in Gosforth ===
- Donna Air – actress and television presenter.
- Michael Chopra – footballer for Blackpool F.C.
- Robbie Elliott – retired footballer, current strength coach for United States U-20 men's football team.
- Anna Gilthorpe – actress.
- Wilfred Josephs – composer.
- Joan B. Lee – actress and model, wife of Stan Lee.
- Professor W. Grigor McClelland - owner of Laws Stores, academic and social activist
- Angela Milner - Palaeontologist
- Ben Price – actor.
- Alan Shearer – retired international footballer.
- Tod Slaughter – actor and theatre manager
- Scotty T - television personality

=== Residents of Gosforth ===
- Richard Adams – fair-trade businessman – lived in Gosforth.
- Jonathan Edwards – triple jump world record holder.
- John Grundy – television presenter, teacher and author.
- Tony Harrison – poet.
- Rowland Hodge – shipbuilder (lived at Coxlodge Hall).
- David Knopfler – guitarist in Dire Straits, moved to Gosforth as a child, brother of Mark.
- Mark Knopfler – guitarist and vocalist in Dire Straits, moved to Gosforth as a child.
- Andrew Leslie – shipbuilder (lived at Coxlodge Hall).
- Sally Morton – Tyne Tees Television announcer.
- Nolberto Solano – Former Newcastle United footballer.
- Neil Tennant – musician, and one half of the Pet Shop Boys. The Tennants moved from North Shields to Gosforth when Tennant was young.
- Kenneth Ridley Bell – businessman who founded Ken Bell International.
- Olga and Betty Turnbull, child entertainers of the 1930s who performed for royalty.

== Listed buildings ==
There are a number of buildings with listed status in Gosforth:

- The Stables, The Drive (Grade II)
- The Lodge, 2 The Drive (Grade II)
- Burnstead, Broadway East (Grade II)
- All Saints' Church, West Avenue (Grade II)
- West Avenue Methodist Church (now Trinity Church) (Grade II)
- The County Inn, High Street (Grade II)
- 1–2 Roseworth Terrace (Grade II)
- 32–36 and 38–52 High Street (Grade II)
- 7–21 and 23–33 The Grove (Grade II)
- 39–73 Graham Park Road flats (Grade II)
- The Queen Victoria, High Street (Grade II)
- The Gosforth Hotel, High Street (Grade II)
- 31–49 Moor End, Moor Crescent (Grade II)
- Yarm House, Roseworth Crescent (Grade II)
- Lanesborough Court (formally St Nicholas’ hospital) (Grade II)

== Nearest places ==
- Jesmond
- Longbenton
- Kingston Park
- Kenton
- Gosforth Park
- Great Park

== Nearest metro stations ==
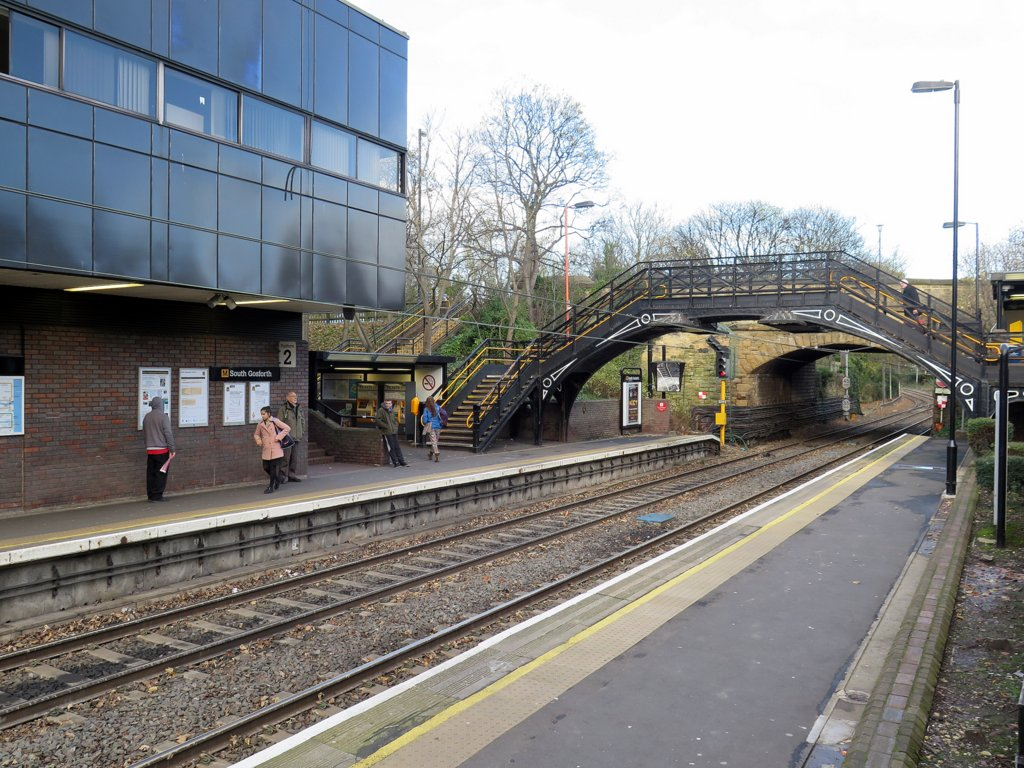
South Gosforth Metro station, and its 1864 bridge on the right. The Metro system is run from the control building on the left.

- South Gosforth Metro station
- Regent Centre Metro station
- Ilford Road Metro station
- Wansbeck Road Metro station

== Photo gallery ==
Gosforth High Street
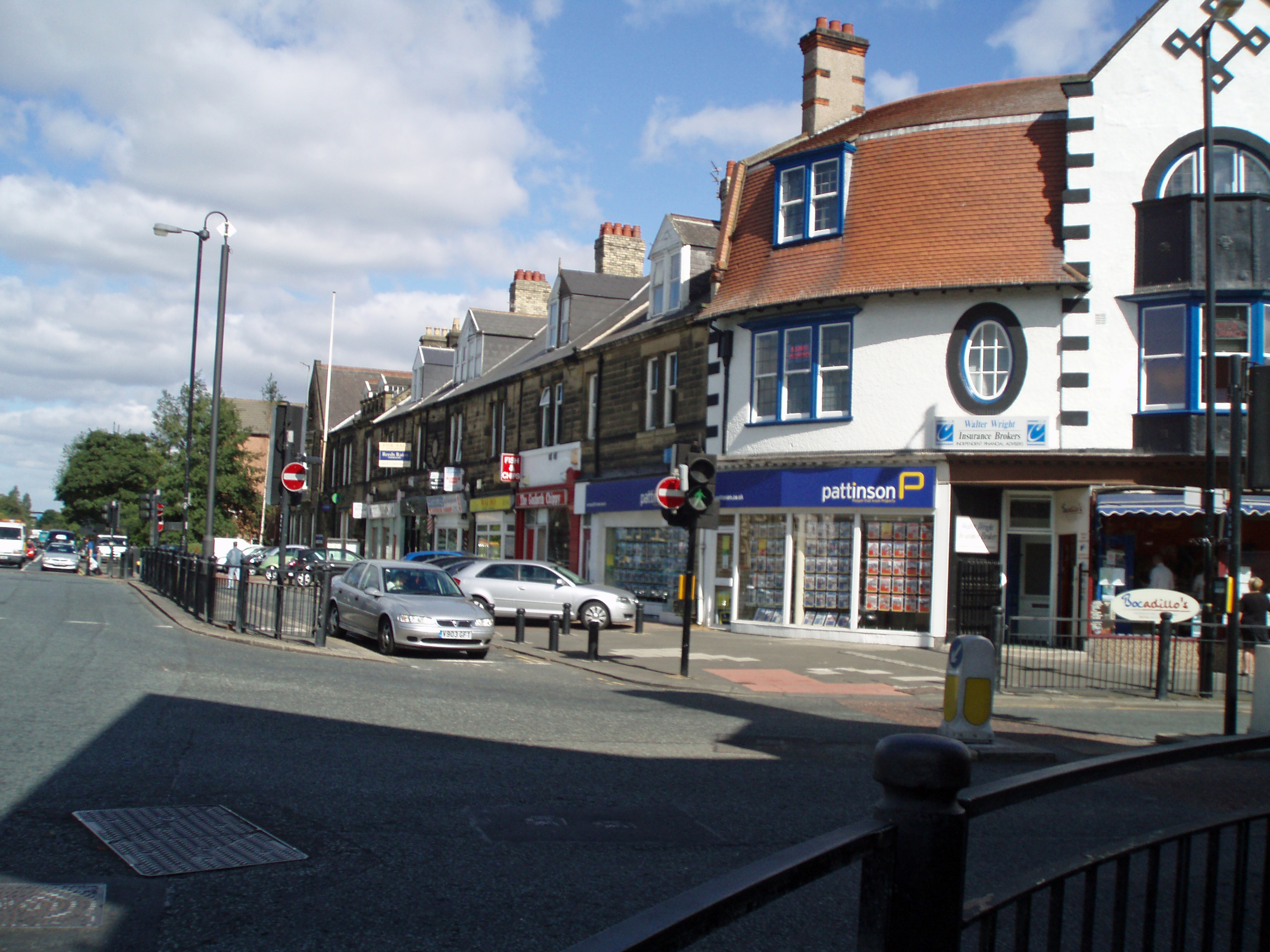
North end of High Street

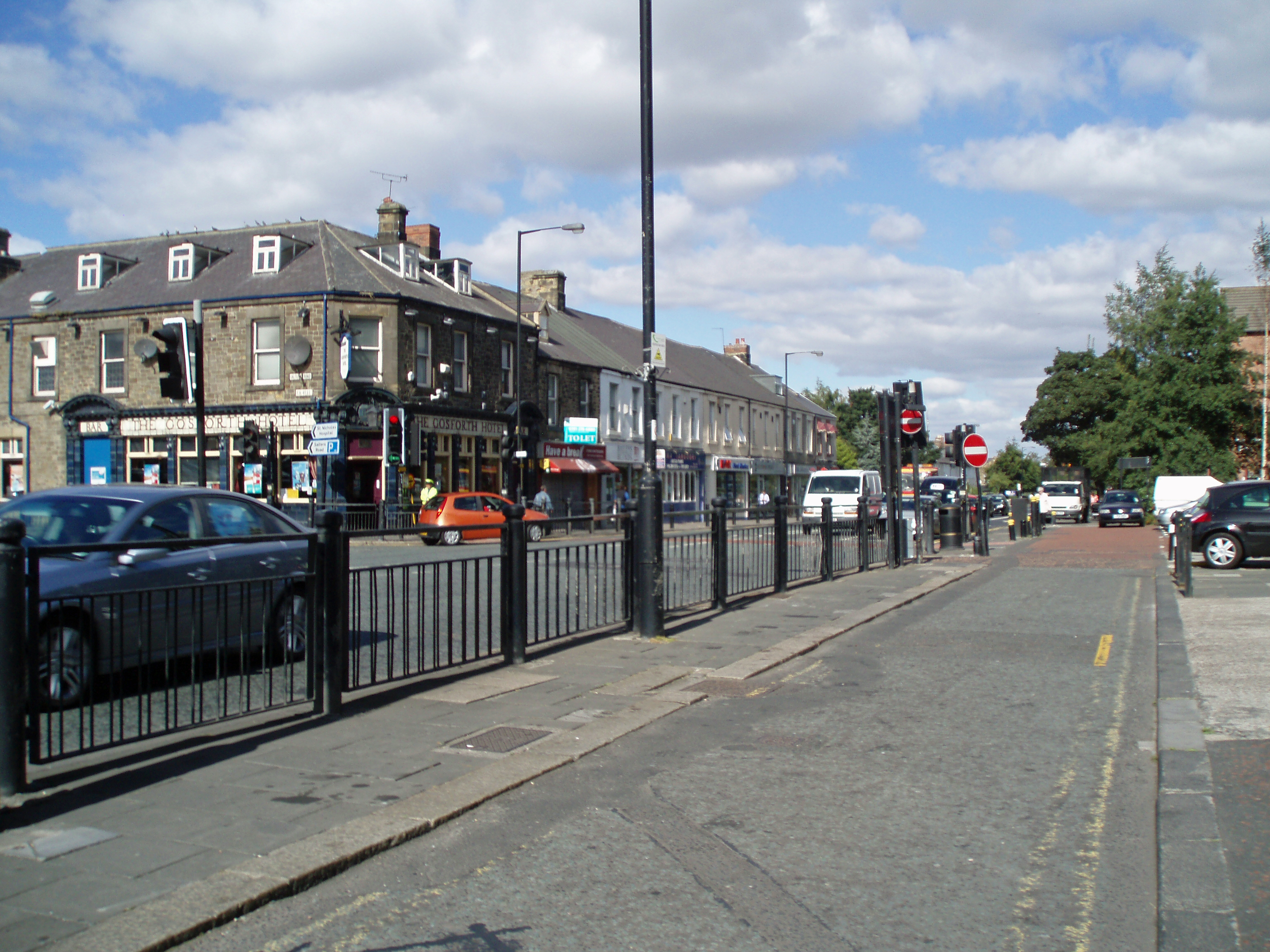
Gosforth Hotel and shops on Gosforth High Street

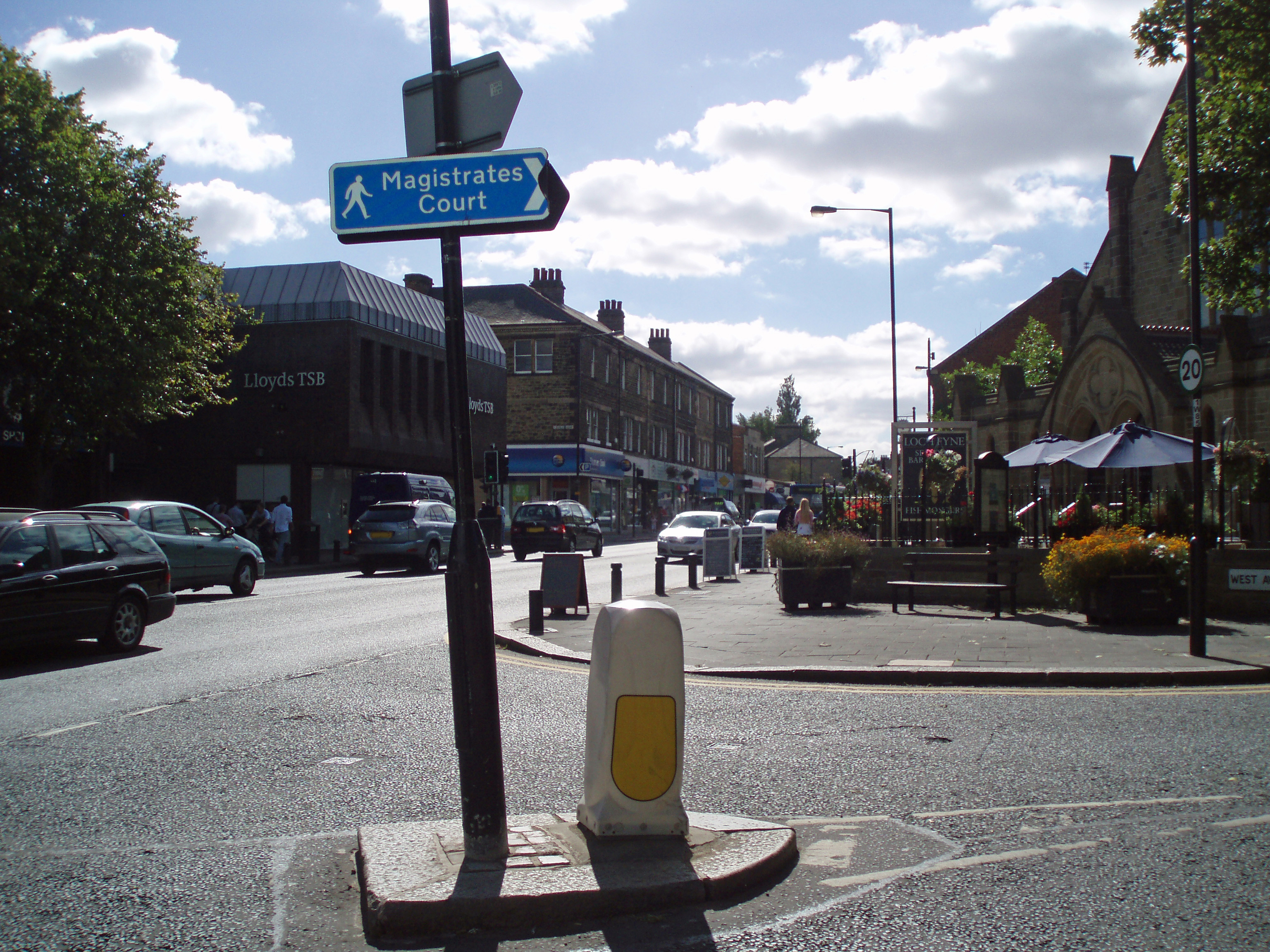
High Street taken from in between the two churches

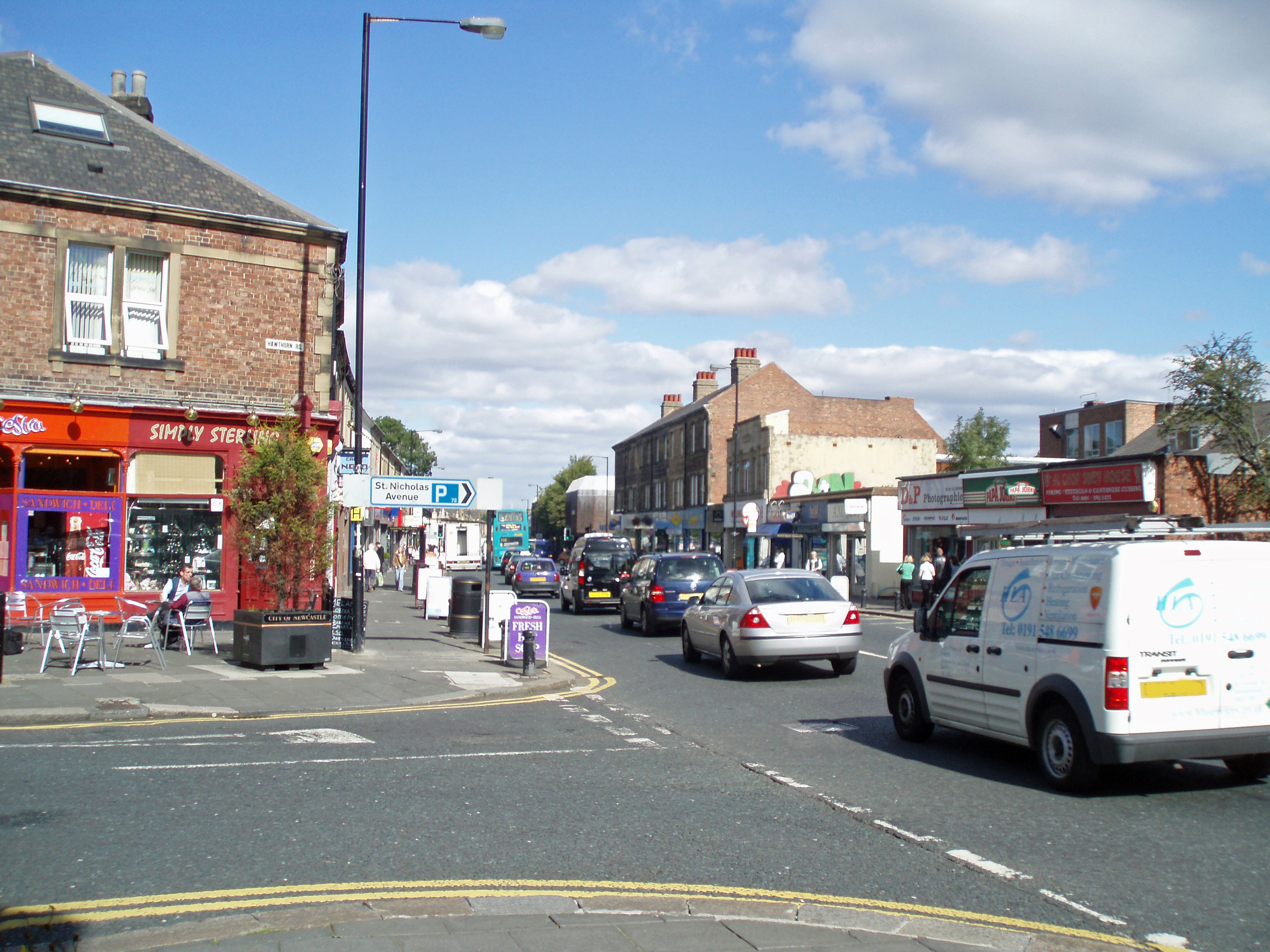
Southern approach to High Street

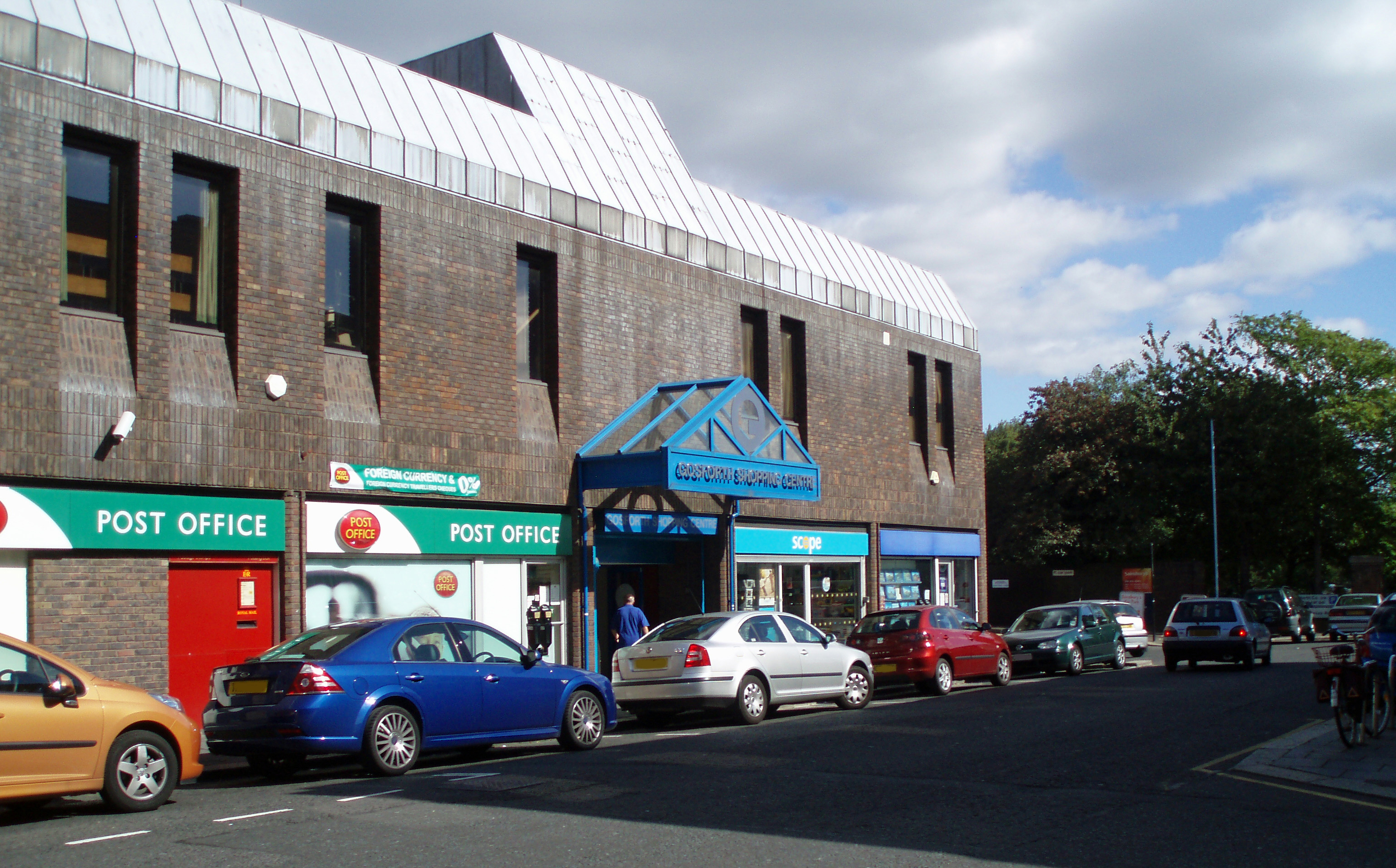
Side of Gosforth Shopping Centre

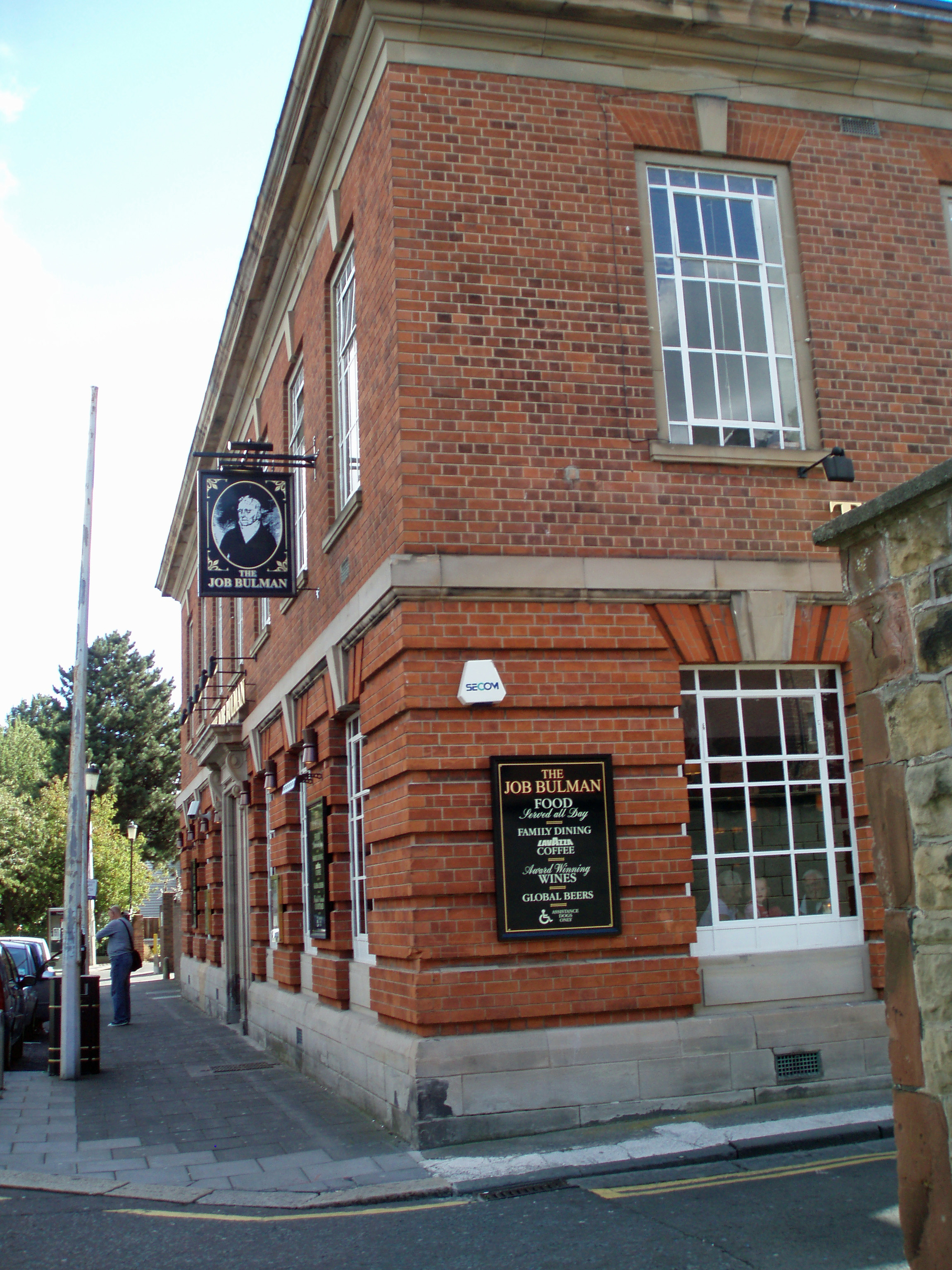
Job Bulman pub, a former post office building
