= Thomas Hedley Co. =

- Company type: Limited company
- Industry: Soap and Candle manufacturing
- Founded: 1837
- Defunct: 1930
- Fate: Acquired by Procter and Gamble
- Headquarters: Newcastle upon Tyne, United Kingdom

The Thomas Hedley Co. was a British company based in Newcastle upon Tyne manufacturing soap and candles. It was founded in 1837 by two businessmen, Thomas Hedley and John Green, who set up a manufacturing facility on the city's City Road. Tyneside was able to provide a ready source of sheep, which was a source of the main ingredient (tallow) in the production of both products.

Thomas Hedley himself died in 1890 and the business was carried on by his son. In 1898 the company became a limited company by issuing shares. In 1917 and 1918 the company expanded by acquiring the soap makers James Dyson & Co. of Elland in Yorkshire, and John Pickering & Sons Limited of Birmingham, Warwickshire.

The company continued to expand its City Road site. At the time City Road was primarily a residential area, and the expansion was a slow process, as Thomas Hedley had to buy a single property at a time. The City Road site continued after the company's acquisition, in 1930, by Procter and Gamble, and Thomas Hedley's Newcastle roots prompted P&G's presence on Tyneside. Other Hedley plants were in Trafford Park, Manchester and West Thurrock, Essex.
