= The Newcastle School =

Location
- 30 West Avenue; Newcastle-upon-Tyne, Tyne and Wear, NE5 4ES; England; 55.00444°N 1.62408°W

Information
- Type: Independent School
- Established: 2005
- Local authority: Newcastle upon Tyne
- Department for Education URN: 108544 Tables
- Head teacher: Mr Graeme Hallam
- Gender: Boys and Girls
- Age: 3 to 18
- Enrolment: 400
- Houses: Aldridge, Ascham, Newlands and Mavor
- Colours: Blue and Grey
- Website: http://www.newcastleschool.co.uk

The Newcastle School, or TNS, is a private day school for pupils aged 3–18 in Gosforth, Newcastle-upon-Tyne, England. It has approximately 400 students.

== History ==
Newcastle School for Boys (NSB) was formed in 2005 with the merger of Ascham House School and Newlands Preparatory School.

Chris Hutchinson was appointed Headmaster of NSB in 2007. A major extension to the senior school, which is housed in the large, Victorian-era former home of colliery owner, John Henry Reah, was completed in 2008. The Sixth Form accepted its first students in September 2009.

David Tickner was appointed as Headmaster in April 2012, and the school acquired additional premises opposite the Senior School to house a purpose-designed Sixth Form Centre in 2017.

The school became co-educational in 2026.

== Admissions ==
The Junior School is located at West Avenue and sold North Avenue in 2026 which previously accommodated Ascham House School, it caters for children in Nursery and Years 1 to 6. The Senior School is located in a building, which previously accommodated Newlands Preparatory School, in Moor Road South.

== School Life ==
Pupils are sorted into one of four houses upon their arrival. They stay in these houses for the remainder of their time at the school, and partake in weekly hymn practice as a house, and inter-house competitions such as rugby, cricket, and choral. Sports played at TNS include rugby, hockey, netball, swimming, cricket, football and hockey, with regular fixtures played against other northern schools, such as RGS Newcastle, Dame Allans, Durham, Yarm, and Ampleforth.

== Inspections ==
The school was last inspected by the Independent Schools Inspectorate in 2017. All standards were met.
