= Easington Rural District =

Former local government area in County Durham, England

Easington Rural District was a rural district in County Durham from 1894 to 1974. The local authority was Easington Rural District Council.

In 1956 the civil parish of Peterlee was created in the district around the new town that had been founded in 1948.

It was abolished in 1974 and replaced with Easington District.
