= Chester-le-Street Rural District =

Former local government area in the UK

Coordinates: 54.860°N 1.574°W

Chester-le-Street was a rural district in County Durham, England from 1894 to 1974. It surrounded the urban district of Chester-le-Street.

The district was split in 1974, under the Local Government Act 1972, with the bulk going to the new Chester-le-Street district. Part of the parishes of Birtley, Harraton and South Biddick went to the Metropolitan Borough of Sunderland, in Tyne and Wear, and Lamesley and the rest of Birtley parish went to the Metropolitan Borough of Gateshead.
