= Gosforth Urban District =

Former local authority area in north east England

- Gosforth Urban District located in Northumberland in 1971
- Area
  - 1901: 1,303 acres (5.3 km^{2})
  - 1961: 1,737 acres (7.0 km^{2})
  - Coordinates: 55.0080°N 1.6196°W
- Area transferred
  - 1935: 434 acres (1.8 km^{2}) from Castle Ward Rural District
- Population
  - 1901: 15,490
  - 1961: 27,064
- History
  - Origin: Public Health Act 1848; Local Government Act 1894
  - Succeeded by: City of Newcastle upon Tyne
- Status: Local board 1872–1895; Urban district 1895–1974
- History
  - Established: 1872
  - Established as urban district: 1894
  - Disestablished: 31 March 1974
- Contained within
  - County: Northumberland
  - Police force: Northumberland Constabulary

Gosforth was a local government district in Northumberland from 1872 to 1974.

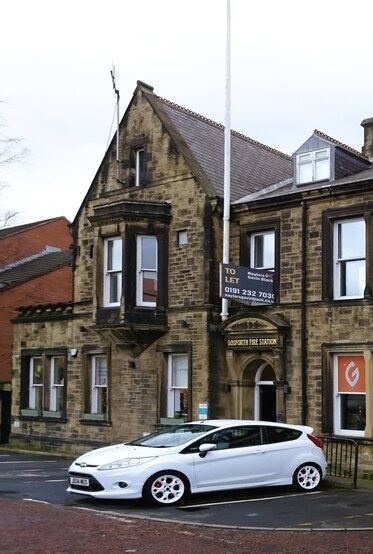
Gosforth Council Offices

On 20 September 1872, a Local Board was formed for the civil parishes of South Gosforth and Coxlodge, known as the South Gosforth Local Board.

Under the local Government Act 1894 South Gosforth became an urban district. A year later, by a Northumberland County Council order dated 14 March 1895, the title was changed to Gosforth Urban District. The council was based at the council offices in the High Street in Gosforth.

On 15 July 1903, the Urban District Council applied for an order from Northumberland County Council to extend its boundaries to include the parishes of North Gosforth, East Brunton, West Brunton, Fawdon and the greater part of Kenton. On 9 September 1903, an inquiry was held into the Gosforth Scheme, but the proposal was refused. The parishes of Coxlodge and South Gosforth were amalgamated into the parish of Gosforth in 1908. Gosforth then extended its boundaries after the County of Northumberland Review Order 1935, to include part of Castle Ward Rural District. This comprised parts of East Brunton, Fawdon and North Gosforth civil parishes.

In 1974, the urban district was abolished and its area was transferred to the new metropolitan county of Tyne and Wear under the Local Government Act 1972. Gosforth's area was combined with the County Borough of Newcastle, Newburn Urban District and parts of Castle Ward Rural District to form the present-day metropolitan borough of Newcastle upon Tyne.
