= Newcastle College =

Educational institution in Newcastle upon Tyne, England

Coordinates: 54°58′00″N 1°37′40″W

Location
- Scotswood Road; Elswick, Newcastle upon Tyne, NE4 7SA; England

Information
- Type: Further Education Higher Education
- Department for Education URN: 130552 Tables
- Ofsted: Reports
- Principal: Jon Ridley
- Staff: 1218
- Gender: Mixed
- Age: 14+
- Enrolment: c. 45,000 (2013–14)
- Colours: Blue, white
- Website: www.ncl-coll.ac.uk

Newcastle College is a large further education and higher education college in Newcastle upon Tyne, with more than 16,000 students enrolled each year on a variety of full time, part time, and distance learning. It is the largest further education college in the North East of England and one of the largest in the United Kingdom.

The college provides Further Education, Apprenticeships and adult courses across 23 subject areas, as well as higher education through Newcastle College University Centre.

Newcastle College is a division of NCG, one of the largest education, training and employability organisations in the UK.

== History ==
Newcastle College can trace its roots back to 1894, when it was established as Rutherford Memorial College, becoming Rutherford Grammar School in 1945. In 1930, the President of the Board of Education Charles Trevelyan founded the Trevelyan Building for girls. In 1962 the college was divided into two separate divisions, the college of Further Education and the Charles Trevelyan Technical College. In 1972 the two colleges merged and became known as Newcastle College of Arts and Technology, changing name in 1988 to Newcastle College. Newcastle College gave the reason for the merger as having a responsibility to support improvement in other colleges, and to retain its level of Train to Gain funding.

According to The Journal, the college was falling into disrepair in the late twentieth century. Dame Jackie Fisher, who joined the college as principal in 2000 and later became chief executive of the group, suggests that the buildings were in a poor state due to lack of investment in the 1990s and that the structure of the college was wasteful. The restructuring took Fisher and her team three and a half years, with the college, as of September 2011, turning over £150m a year, compared to £45m in 2003.

In 2013, Newcastle College appointed new Principal, Carole Kitching.

In 2020, Principal Scott Bullock was appointed. He remained in role until August 2024 when Deputy Principal Jon Ridley took up the role following Scott’s departure.

== Ofsted judgements ==
Ofsted downgraded the college from 'outstanding' to 'good' following an inspection in 2012. It was widely reported that college management had ejected the inspection team from the premises, and that some inspectors were offered counselling as a result of the process. In 2018 it was re-inspected and judged to Require Improvement. It was re-inspected in 2022 and judged Good.

== NCG ==
Newcastle College is a division of NCG (formerly Newcastle College Group). With a turnover of more than £155 million, NCG is one of the largest education, training and employability organisations in the UK.

It is made up of seven colleges. In August 2007, the college merged with Skelmersdale & Ormskirk College, a college in Lancashire; it was later renamed West Lancashire College in August 2011.

Intraining was formed in March 2008, following the acquisition of TWL Training in December 2007, and the purchase of the troubled training organisation Carter & Carter in March 2008. This led to the introduction of the Newcastle College Group (NCG).

In November 2011, the group also acquired the British youth charity Rathbone Training. The college attempted to merge with Northumberland College, but the Ashington-based college rejected the merger plans in response to feedback from their staff, students and local MPs.

In November 2005, the Times Educational Supplement reported that lecturers who rebelled, "against new contracts, were defeated after they faced losing their jobs." Following cuts by the coalition government, the college reorganised its curriculum structure leading to 200-equivalent full-time job losses, with 188 new jobs created in 2011. The restructure lead to the grade, and therefore salary, reduction of many teaching staff. Shortly after redundancies were announced, The Guardian reported that NCG's chief executive, Dame Jackie Fisher, "enjoyed a pay rise, including bonus and retention payment, of almost £73,000." However, the report mentions a spokeswoman's defence of the pay rise, pointing out "that Fisher is responsible for three divisions with an annual turnover of £152m in 2009-10." Also in 2011, allegations of workplace bullying were made against college management and reported on the BBC's regional Inside Out programme in January 2012. NCG responded that “it takes any allegation of bullying extremely seriously and has a clear and transparent process for dealing with staff concerns. All reported allegations are always thoroughly investigated and dealt with appropriately.

In March 2014, Newcastle Sixth Form College, a Further Education college in Newcastle upon Tyne, was opened.

In August 2014, Kidderminster College was acquired by NCG.

In 2017, NCG merged with Lewisham and Southwark and Carlise College.

NCG was the first Further Education provider in the UK to be awarded Taught Degree Awarding Powers, meaning it is able to validate its own degrees.

NCG ran the Discovery School in Newcastle. This opened as a free school in 2014. It was closed in 2018 after safeguarding concerns and an Ofsted judgement of Inadequate.

== Campuses ==
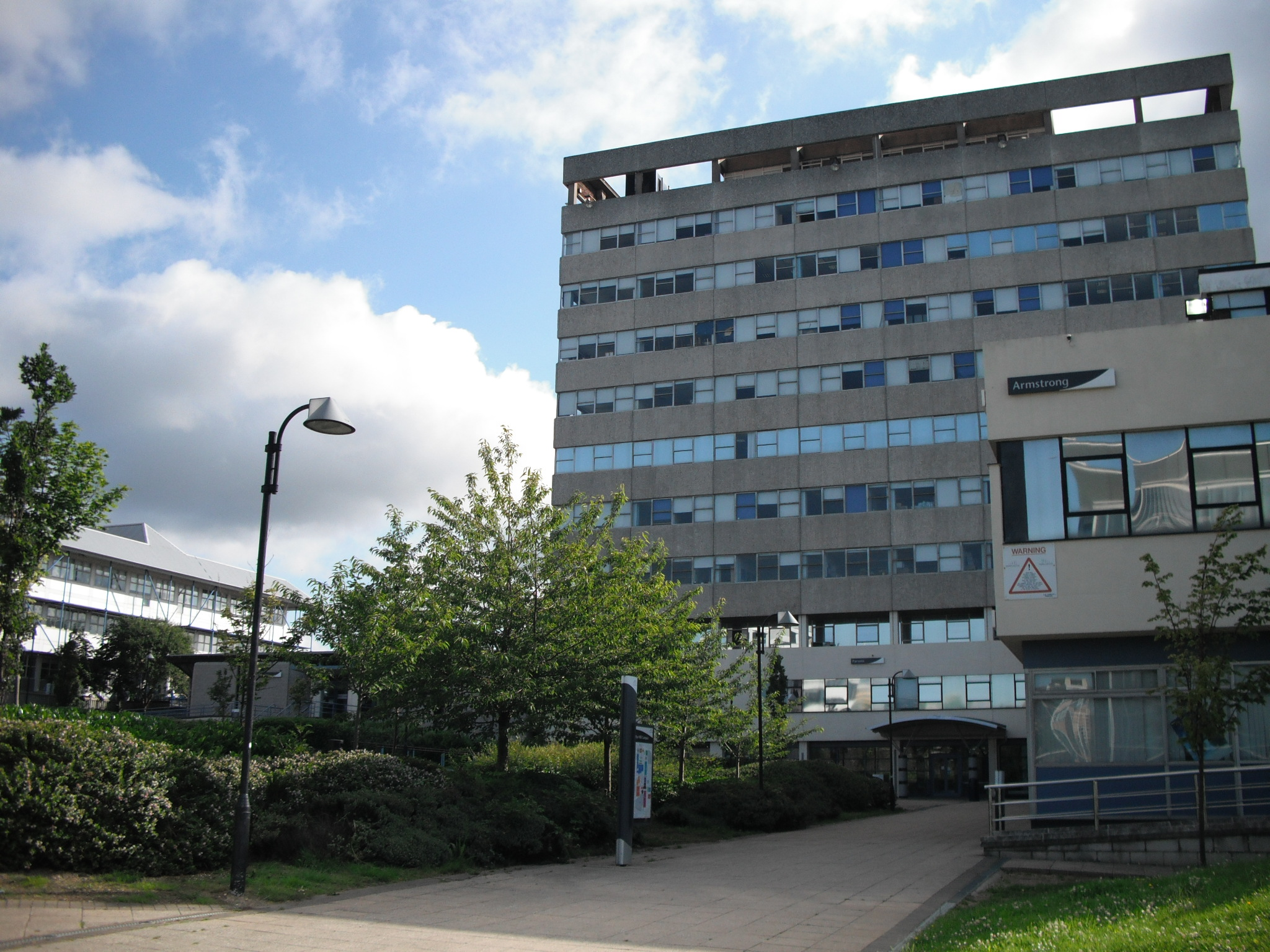
The Parsons Building at the main campus (photographed 2009, prior to refurbishment).

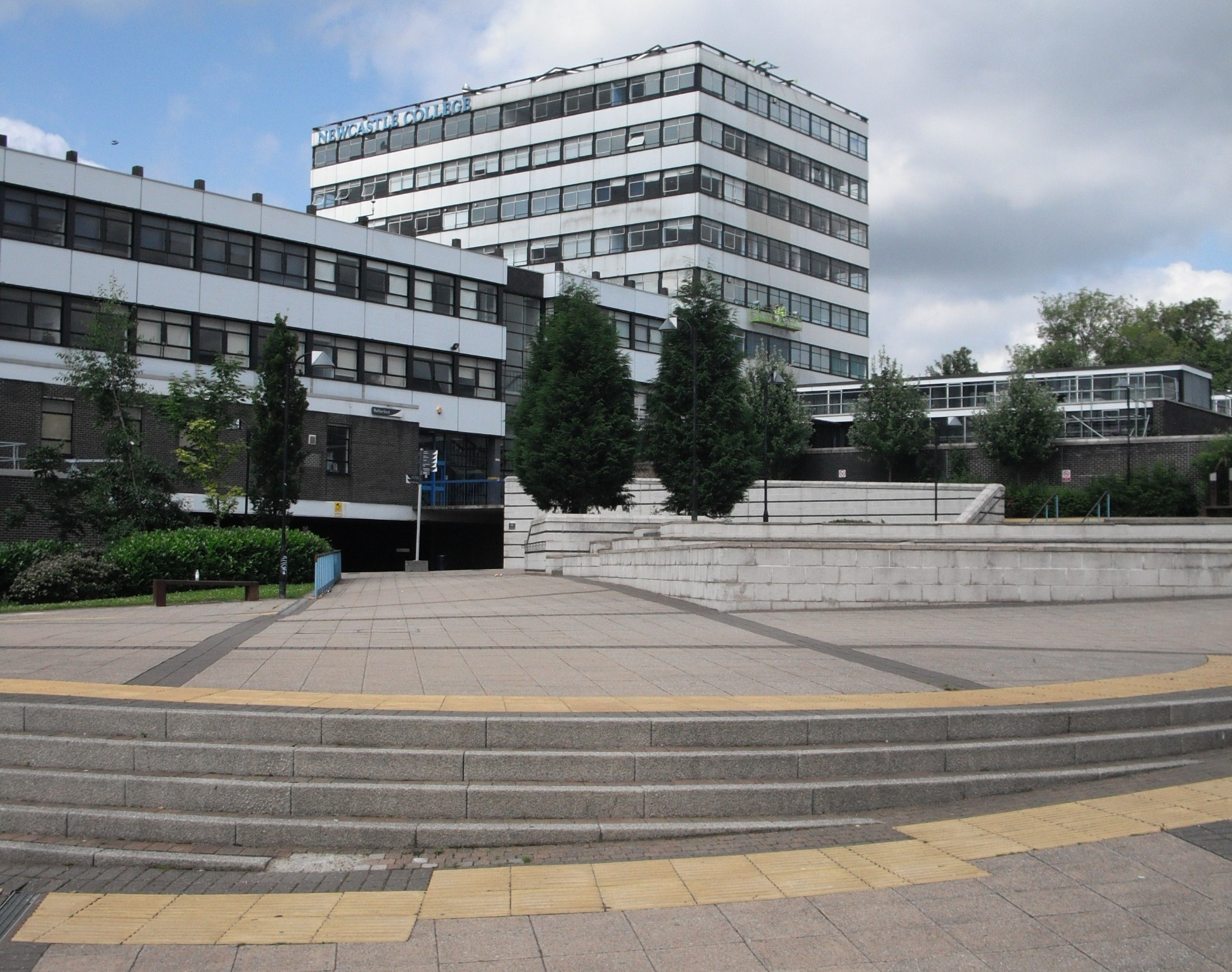
The Rutherford (left) and Trevelyan (tower block) Buildings

The main campus is situated at Rye Hill, close to Newcastle city centre, and there are four satellite sites belonging to the College's School of Engineering. Newcastle Aviation Academy is located next to Newcastle International Airport. and Newcastle College Rail Academy is located in Gateshead. The Energy Academy is based in Wallsend and the Automotive Academy in Scotswood Road.

Work started on the construction of a new Sixth Form college at the Rye Hill campus in August 2011. Designed by international architects RMJM, the building was scheduled to open in 2013. The college was officially opened in 2014 as Newcastle Sixth Form College and is no longer part of Newcastle College, but instead a separate division within NCG.

=== Facilities ===
Performance Academy: Opened in November 2004, the £21m Performance Academy at Newcastle College is one of the UK's leading training centres for music, performing arts and media. The facility comprises a 250-seat theatre; ten recording studios; acting, music and dance studios; and its own record label. Former students from the Performance Academy include Joe McElderry and Perrie Edwards from Little Mix who won The X-Factor in 2009 and 2011 respectively.

Lifestyle Academy: September 2006 saw the opening of the "Lifestyle Academy", for students studying hospitality, beauty, hairdressing, travel and tourism, and sport.

Energy Academy: The Energy Academy in Wallsend is a centre of innovation, training, and development for the offshore wind sector. Opened September in 2011, the 20,000 sq ft centre provides skills training to employers within the renewable energies sector and to young people in the region.

Newcastle Sixth Form College: In 2013 Newcastle College opened a new building to the sixth form which was new to the college.

Rail Academy: Opened in 2014, Newcastle College Rail Academy (located in Gateshead) was built to address skills shortage in the rail industry, developed in conjunction with the National Skills Academy for Railway Engineering (NSAR) and employers such as Network Rail. The £5 million site has on-site overhead lines, switching, crossings, telecommunications, multiple P-way set ups and electronic PLC testing and monitoring equipment.

Aviation Academy: This £3 million facility is next to Newcastle International Airport and consists of a 12,000m aircraft hangar and ground-training aircraft such as a BAE Jetstream, Boeing 737 and Jet Provosts.

Parsons Building: Opened in 2016, this £18 million building has retail units, hospital training wards, childcare training rooms, science laboratories, learner zones and social spaces.

Mandela Building: Painting and sculpture studios, MAC suites; 3D design workshops, digital photography suites, an exhibition space and a darkroom. The foundation diploma for Art & Design has also been registered as a University Arts London (UAL) Approved Centre.

Automotive Centre: This centre has a number of automotive workshops.

Rutherford Building: CAD workshops, CNC machinery, construction workshop, paint and decorating suites, welding and joinery equipment and electrical and plumbing workshops.

== Higher education ==
Newcastle College also offers HE qualifications. These include foundation degrees, bachelor's degrees and master's degrees. The college has over 3,000 HE students and is one of the biggest providers of HE in FE. These students have access to HE-only facilities such as the HE Hub.

The college previously offered foundation degrees validated by universities, including Leeds Metropolitan, Northumbria, and Sunderland. In July 2011, Newcastle College was awarded Foundation Degree(FD) Awarding Powers, allowing it to develop and validate its own FD programmes.

== Notable alumni ==
- Sharon Hodgson – Labour politician and MP
- Joe McElderry
- Ross Noble
- Michelle Heaton
- Ant & Dec
- Perrie Edwards
- John Wilson
- Natalie Ann Jamieson
