= Great Park =

Great Park may refer to:

Places in England

- Newcastle Great Park, Newcastle upon Tyne
- Windsor Great Park, Berkshire
- Great Park, Longbridge, Birmingham

Places in the United States

- Orange County Great Park, Irvine, California
