= Newcastle Great Park =

Coordinates: 55.032°N 1.644°W

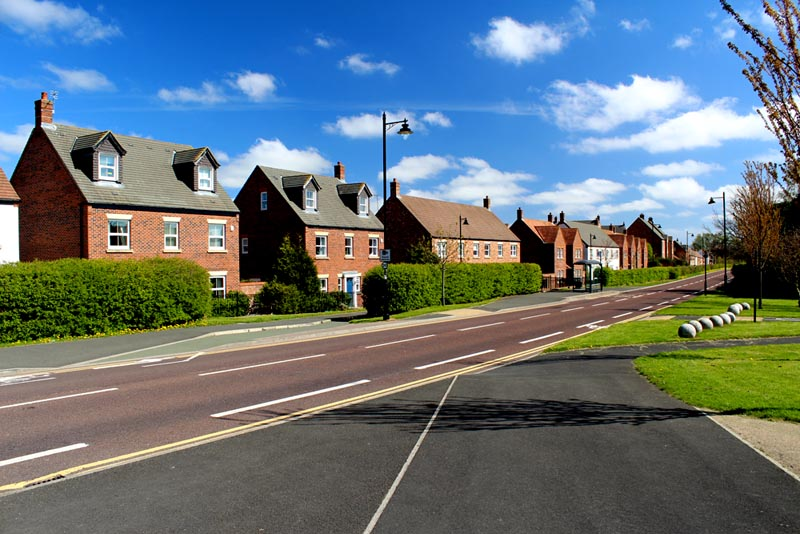

- Location within Tyne and Wear
- OS grid reference: NZ 229 709
- Metropolitan borough: Newcastle upon Tyne
- Metropolitan county: Tyne and Wear
- Region: North East
- Country: England
- Sovereign state: United Kingdom
- Post town: NEWCASTLE UPON TYNE
- Postcode district: NE3, NE13
- Dialling code: 0191
- Police: Northumbria
- Fire: Tyne and Wear
- Ambulance: North East
- UK Parliament: Newcastle upon Tyne North
- Website: newcastlegreatpark.com

Newcastle Great Park is a new suburb in the north of Newcastle upon Tyne, England. Much of Newcastle Great Park is still under development and is sandwiched in between older areas of Newcastle, namely Gosforth, Fawdon and Kingston Park to the south, and Hazlerigg to the north. Newcastle Great Park is the largest housing development in the North East of England.

== History ==
Development of this area, Newcastle City Council's 'Northern Development Area' had been in planning since at least 1991. In the 1990s the plans consisted of 2,500 houses and a 200-acre business and industrial development which could provide up to 10,000 jobs. Current indicative phasing shows plans for 3,300+ homes by 2030 and 4,100+ beyond 2030.

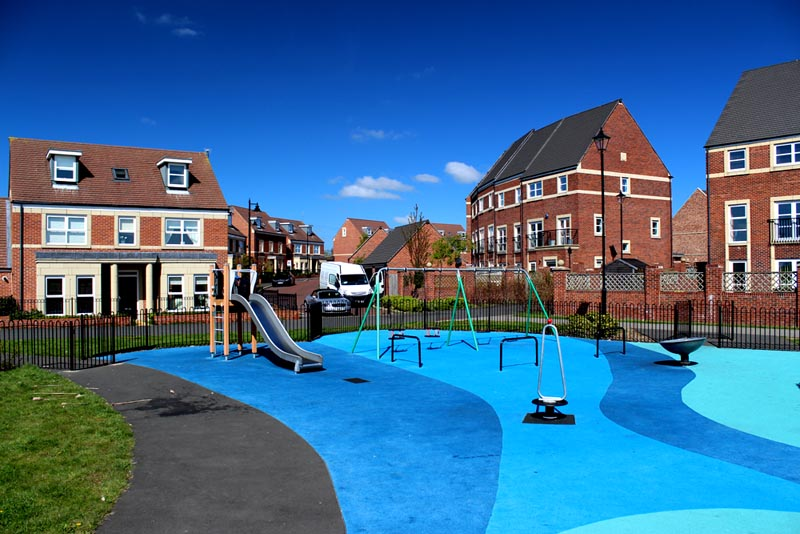
Play park within Melbury development (April 2014)

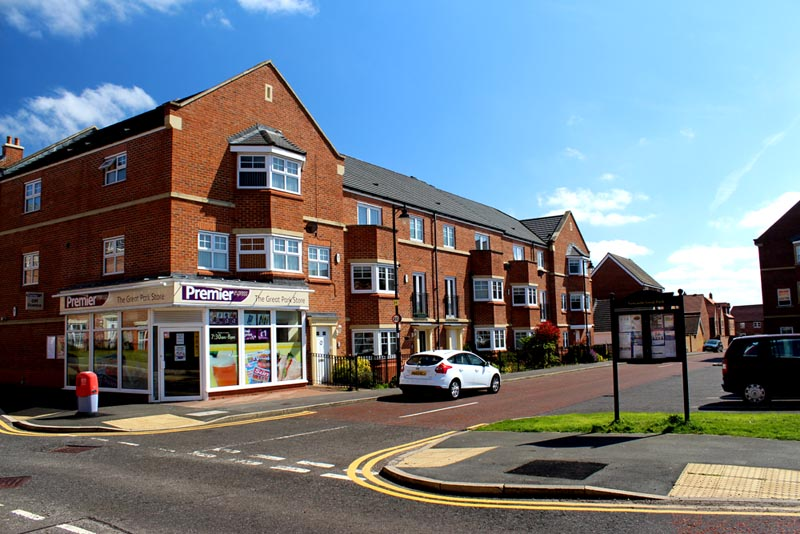
Great Park Store within Melbury development (now closed).

Prior to the area becoming a large housing and business development, the area to the north of the Great Park development was Hazlerigg Colliery. After the colliery closed the land it stood on was redeveloped into Havannah Nature Reserve. Fawdon Wagonway served the local collieries during the 19th century; the Wagonway lends its name to a street in the new development and part of the wagonway's route is still in existence as a public footpath.

=== Development ===
The Newcastle Great Park development is 15 years into a 30+ year building project. Estates within the Great Park include:

- Brunton Grange (phases 1, 2 & 3)
- Brunton Green
- Brunton Meadows
- Brunton Village
- Brunton West
- East Moor Village
- Elmwood Park Court
- Elmwood Park Gardens
- Elmwood Park Green
- Elmwood Park View
- Greenside
- Melbury
- Warkworth Woods
- West Heath

Housing is currently under development by Charles Church, Persimmon Homes and Taylor Wimpey. Great Park town centre is under construction near Brunton Lane to the west of the A1. According to Newcastle City Council the town centre will include a supermarket, high street style shops, cafés, restaurants, a hotel, nursing home, private hospital and leisure facilities.

=== Housing numbers ===
House building in Great Park started in 2001 on the Warkworth Woods development shortly followed by Melbury in 2002. The table below shows current and planned housing numbers, in date order, up to 2030:

Development Name	Development Cell	Developer	Timescale	Number of Homes
Warkworth Woods	Cell H	Bryant Homes	2001–2005	175
Melbury	Cell I	TBC	2002–2010	500
Greenside	Cell G	Taylor Wimpey & Persimmon Homes	2007–2016	326
Town Centre (Flats - phase 1)	Cell F	TBC	2009–2010	82
East Moor Village	Cell F	Taylor Wimpey	2009–2012	82
Brunton Village / Grange (phase 1)	Cell F	Taylor Wimpey & Persimmon Homes	2010–2015	282
Brunton Grange (phase 2)	Cell F	Taylor Wimpey & Persimmon Homes	2013–2019	332
Elmwood Park Court / View / Gardens / Green	Cell C	Persimmon Homes & Charles Church	2013–2021	432
Brunton Green / Grange (phase 3)	Cell E	Taylor Wimpey & Persimmon Homes	2015–2019	155
Town Centre (Flats - phase 2)	Cell F	TBC	2016–2017	38
Brunton West	Cell D	Taylor Wimpey	2017–2021	82
Brunton Meadows	Cell D	Persimmon Homes	2017–2021	81
West Heath	Cell D	Taylor Wimpey	2017–2021	164
The Oaklands	Cell D	Charles Church	2020–2022	44
TBC	Cell D	TBC	2021–2029	429
TBC	Cell A	TBC	2021–2030	880

== Education ==
Newcastle Great Park contains two first schools, Brunton First School and Havannah First School, and as Newcastle operates a three tier education system older students feed into Gosforth Junior High Academy and on to Gosforth Academy (via its Great Park Academy new school). Brunton First School opened in September 2009 and Havannah First School opened in 2022 when Gosforth's Broadway East First School relocated to the Great Park.

In 2015 the academy unveiled a bid to build an additional 1,200-place secondary school in Newcastle Great Park as potential plan to meet the demand for school places from the expanding residential community in the area. The Secretary of State for Education confirmed the proposal to build a school as part of the Gosforth Academy federation at the Great Park in Cell A with an intended opening date of September 2020. Formal approval of a first school providing spaces for 450 pupils and a middle/secondary school for up to 1,700 pupils was granted by Newcastle City Council in October 2019. The Great Park Academy (GPA) has been delayed due a judicial review process which wildlife campaigners lost in February 2020. The new schools are now expected to open in 2025 and contingency measures, including 'bulge classes' at existing schools, are being implemented to provide for pupils.

== Business ==
=== Sage ===
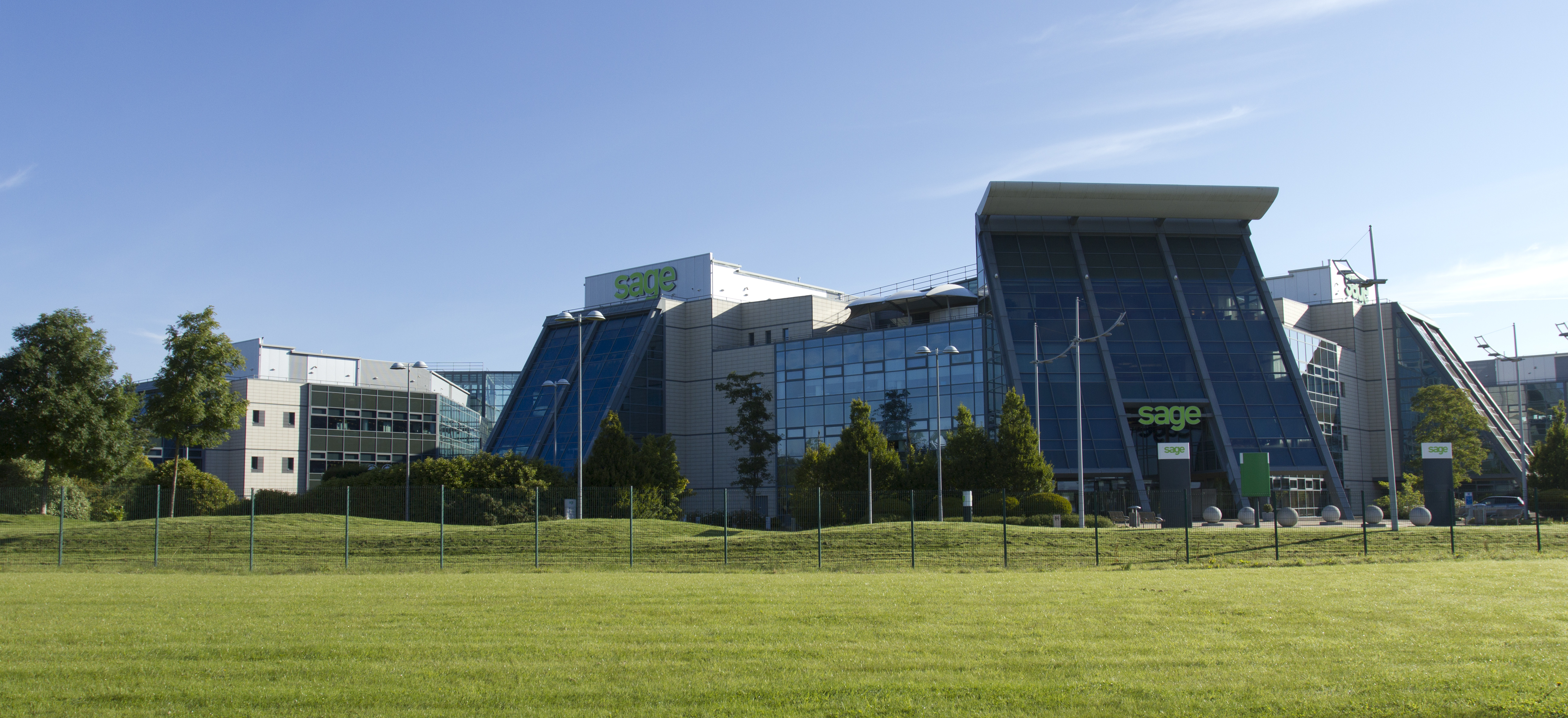
The former Great Park headquarters of business software company Sage Group plc.

The software company Sage Group had their world headquarters in Newcastle Great Park between 2004 and 2021. Sage Group's building, named North Park, was one of the first occupants of Newcastle Great Park in 2004 as Sage moved their Newcastle-based staff into a single building for the first time having previously been spread between two buildings on Benton Park Road and also in Horsley House in Regent Centre. As of 2021 Sage's building in Great Park is vacant and up for sale/lease.

Sage's 32,000 square metres (340,000 sq ft) building housing approximately 1500 employees was built at a cost of £57 million. The building was worked on by Cundall, Tolent and idpartnership architects, and required the use of the largest mobile crane in the country at the time of construction. The building was shortlisted for the British Council for Offices Awards (2005 - Corporate Workplace Project) and was the runner up for the Landmark Awards (2005 - Office Development).

During the planning stages Sage's building was initially earmarked for Cell B of the development before switching to Cell C; moving further from the A1 road. The building was designed to be built in two phases and able to house up to 3000 members of staff, however this expansion did not occur.

In 2019 Sage announced their intention to move their Newcastle office out of their North Park headquarters building and into the Cobalt Business Park, the UK's largest business park, signing a 15-year lease starting 2020/2021.

=== Esh Plaza ===
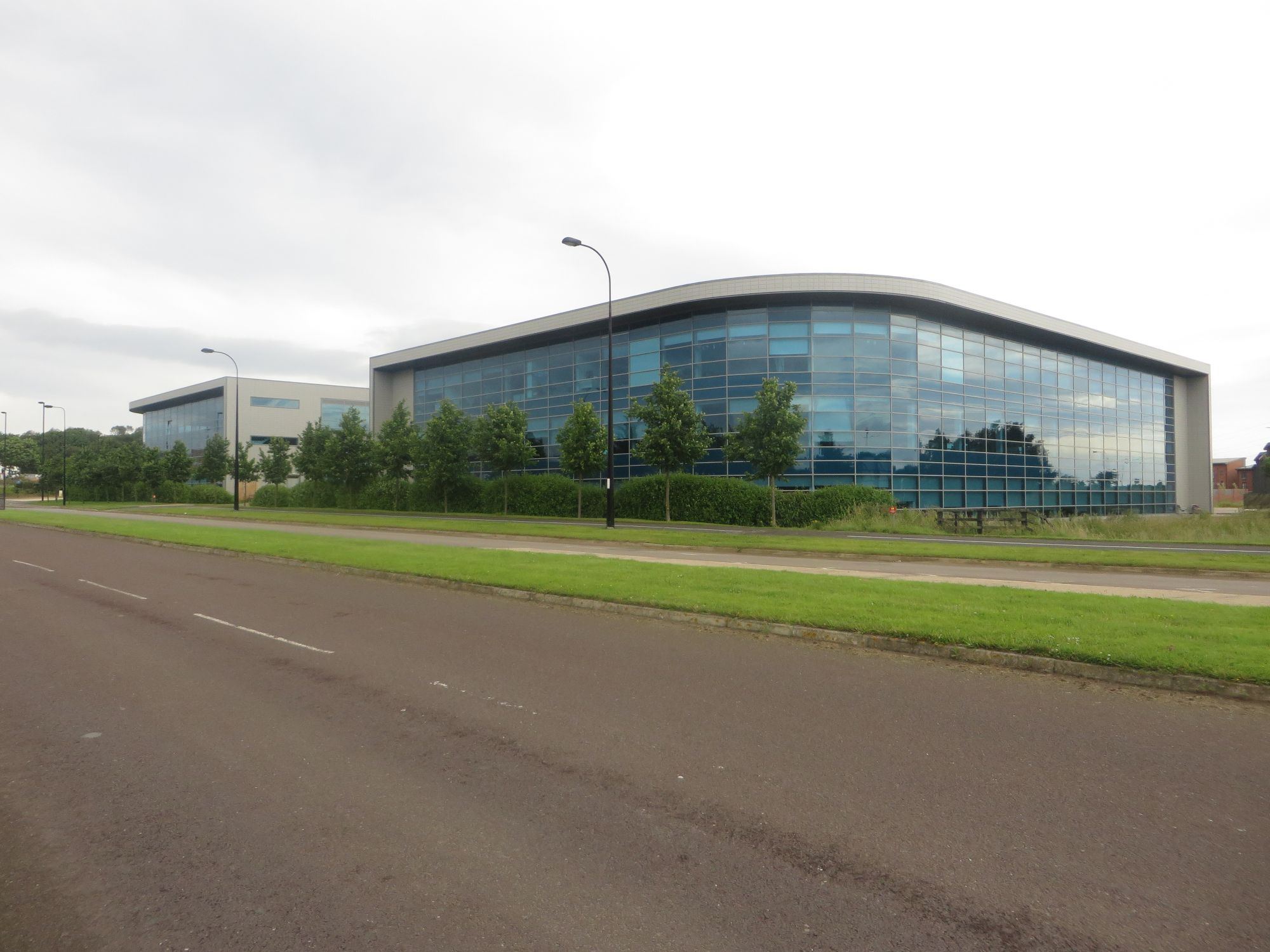
Esh Plaza

Esh Plaza is a business office development consisting of two buildings that includes the headquarters of Bede Gaming – previous occupants included the Credit Services Association and the NHS.

== Shopping ==
A Londis shop, which opened on Featherstone Grove in March 2011, was the first store in the Melbury estate (this changed to a Premier Express shop known as 'The Great Park Store'), but this has since closed.

A pharmacy is open in the town centre area. In July 2021 a branch of One Stop opened in Middleton South in the Town Centre.

In 2023 a Morrisons supermarket opened.

A dental practice opened in the town centre in August 2022 on the site of Middleton North.

== Community ==
The Great Park Community Centre, based on Roseden Way, opened in March 2014 and provides a range of services and facilities to the local community including:

- A main hall that can seat up to 100 people
- The main hall can be split into 3 smaller spaces
- Meeting room for up to 14 people
- Kitchen facilities
- 2 x Sports England standard football pitches
- Floodlit courts including:
- 2 x floodlit tennis courts
- Netball court
- Basketball court
- 2 x 5-a-side pitches

A wide range of activities run from the centre including A Church of England group, Pilates, Children's Dance, Drama Sessions, Martial Arts, Girl Guides, Summer Camps, Free Play and more.

== Transport ==
=== Air ===
The closest airport to Newcastle Great Park is Newcastle International Airport, which is located approximately 6 miles (9.7 km) away by road, or 2.9 miles (4.7 km) as the crow flies.

=== Bus ===
As of November 2024, Newcastle Great Park is served by the following bus routes:

Route	Destination
49	Eldon Square via Brunton Park, Regent Centre & Gosforth
Q3	Wallsend via Regent Centre, Gosforth, Jesmond, City Centre, Quayside, Ouseburn, St Peter's Basin, Walker & Walkergate
Q3X (Note: Q3X operates during morning/evening peak hours only (weekdays & Saturday).)	Wallsend express via Regent Centre, Gosforth, City Centre, Quayside, Ouseburn, St Peter's Basin, Walker & Walkergate
X46	Haymarket express via Regent Centre & Gosforth
X47	Eldon Square express via Kingston Park & Cowgate

The X46 links Haymarket bus station with Gosforth, Regent Centre and Featherstone Grove (Melbury). The route operates every hour during the day (Monday to Saturday), and with no Sunday services.

The Quaycity Q3 links Wallsend, Walker, Ouseburn and Quayside with Haymarket bus station, (Note: Quaylink Q3 serves Eldon Square Bus Station on journeys towards Wallsend.) Gosforth, Jesmond, Regent Centre, Great Park Park and Ride and Great Park Village. The route operates up to every 20 minutes during the day (Monday to Saturday), and half-hourly during the evening and on Sunday. There are also extra buses at peak times.

The Q3 got brand new Yutong E12 electric single decker buses in 2022.

As of September 1, 2024 Go North East service Q3 no longer serves Great Park and instead was replaced by Stagecoach North East X47 service giving passengers a link to Kingston Park, Cowgate and Eldon Square Bus Station. A new service 49 was also introduced to continue the link to Regent Centre, Gosforth High Street and Eldon Square Bus Station that was provided by the Q3 albeit with a less frequent service.

=== Rail ===
The closest Tyne and Wear Metro stations to Newcastle Great Park are located at Fawdon and Kingston Park, with Newcastle Central and Manors being the closest National Rail station.

=== Road ===
Newcastle Great Park is situated on the A1 road, to the north of Newcastle. The A19 is near the great park with links to North and South Tyneside. The A19 Interhange is at junction 80, only one junction up from the Great Park. The Great Park is also near the A696 road. This starts only two junctions away from the Great Park at junction 77. The A696 provides connectivity to the Airport, Ponteland, Otterburn and Rural Northumberland.

=== Cycle Paths/Road ===
Cycling is via a dedicated partially segregated cycle route from Newcastle City Centre. However, there is then no dedicated cycle path along the busy Broadway West artery from the Great North Road to the A1 and on to Greenside and Great Park (only a very partially segregated path near Fawdon and over the A1 then winding round to Kingston Park, but not great for commuters or in winter when this is very quiet and dark, and nothing along Kingston Park Road). However a dedicated, segregated route is being campaigned for currently. Local people are signing a new Cycle Lane for Broadway West petition to reduce congestion and improve safety.
