= NSFC =

NSFC may refer to:

- National Natural Science Foundation of China
- National Society of Film Critics
- Newcastle Sixth Form College
- Newham Sixth Form College
- Newtongrange Star F.C.
- Njube Sundowns F.C.
- Northampton Spencer F.C.
- Northern Saints Football Club
- North Shields F.C.
- Northern Sydney Freight Corridor, a program of works designed to improve the passage of rail freight between the Australian cities of Sydney and Newcastle.
