= Eldon Square bus station =

Bus station in Newcastle upon Tyne, England

Eldon Square Bus Station
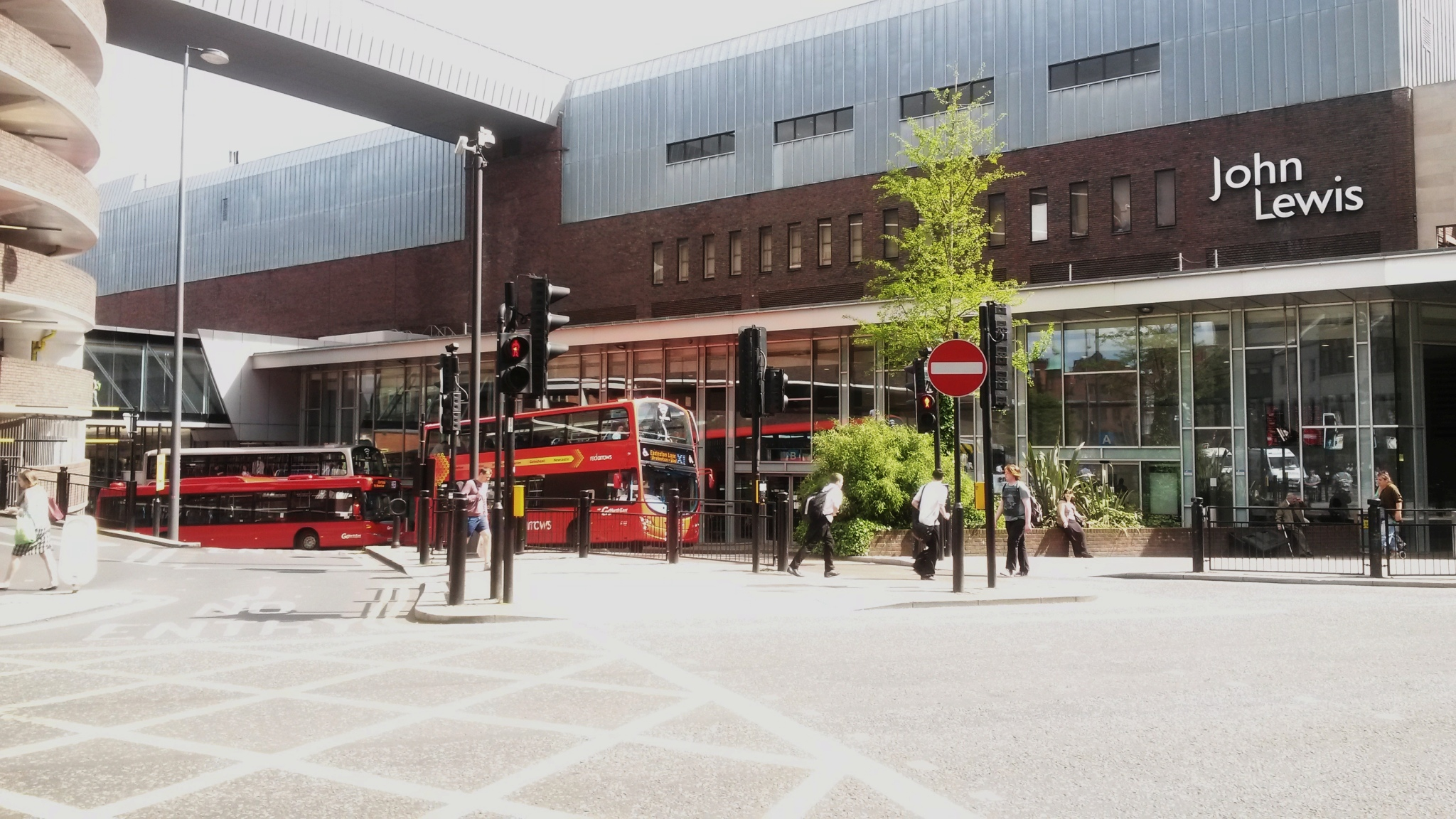

General information
- Location: Eldon Square, Newcastle upon Tyne; England
- Coordinates: 54°58′33″N 1°36′56″W
- Owner: Newcastle City Council
- Operator: Tyne and Wear Passenger Transport Executive
- Bus stands: 10 (lettered A–K; no I)
- Bus operators: Arriva North East; Go North East; Northstar; Stagecoach North East; Peter Hogg of Jedburgh
- Connections: Haymarket bus station; Haymarket; Monument

Construction
- Parking: Nearby pay and display car parking operated by Newcastle City Council
- Accessible: Step-free access

Other information
- Fare zone: Network One: 1; Transfare: Yellow
- Website: www.nexus.org.uk/bus/bus-stations-and-stops/eldon-square-bus-station

Key dates
- March 2007: Opened
Location
- Location within Newcastle-upon-Tyne Location within Tyne and Wear

Eldon Square Bus Station is one of two bus stations serving Newcastle City Centre. It is owned by Newcastle City Council and is managed by Tyne and Wear PTE. The current glass-roofed bus station was built adjacent to the former, and is accessible via the mall.

It is located in the Haymarket area of the city centre, a short walk from Newcastle University and Northumbria University. It offers a connection with services from Haymarket bus station and Haymarket Metro Station. It is attached to, and accessible from Eldon Square Shopping Centre, which links the bus station with the Northumberland Street and Monument areas of the city.

== History ==
The present bus station opened in March 2007, replacing a previous bus station, located below the shopping centre, which has now been converted into a service area and new mall.

In June 2026, the bus station was closed for three weeks in order for refurbishment work to take place. These works included the resurfacing of the road surface, new road markings, improvements to drainage and guardrails and the instalment of new real time passenger information displays.

== Stands and services ==
The station has ten bus stands, nine for departures (stands A to J; no I), and an additional alighting point (stand K). The bus stands at Haymarket continue the lettering sequence (stands L to Y). Each bus stand has ten seats, real-time information displays, and automatic doors (which open only when a bus is at the stand). Glass screens located at each bus stand feature artwork designed by Artstop Studios.

Eldon Square is mainly served by Go North East, with services operating in and around Tyne and Wear, as well as County Durham, west Northumberland and Teesside.

Stagecoach predominantly serve streets within the city, with the bus station serving only the operator's express services beyond the city proper, with destinations including Kingston Park, Newcastle Airport, Ponteland and Throckley, as well as the 685 service to Carlisle.

Two Independent operators also serve the bus station: Peter Hogg of Jedburgh, operating the thrice-daily (except Sunday) X74 service, which runs from the city to Jedburgh via Ponteland, Belsay, Otterburn and the Scottish Border, and Northstar, operating the hourly weekday (school holidays only) and Saturday X43 service to Stanley via Metrocentre, Whickham, Burnhopfield, Tantobie and Tanfield Lea

Bus services from nearby Haymarket are predominantly operated by Arriva North East, serving destinations in the north and east of the city, North Tyneside and south east Northumberland.

Coach services operated by National Express serve the nearby Newcastle coach station, with those operated by FlixBus serving the lay-by on John Dobson Street, near to the City Library.

As of July 2026, the stand allocation is:

Stand	Route	Destination
A	12	Winlaton via Scotswood Road & Blaydon
A	684	Hexham via Denton Burn, Walbottle, Throckley, Heddon-on-the-Wall, Wylam, Ovingham, Ovington & Corbridge
A	685	Carlisle via Denton Burn, Walbottle, Throckley, Heddon-on-the-Wall, Horsley, Corbridge, Hexham, Haydon Bridge, Bardon Mill, Melkridge, Haltwhistle, Brampton & Warwick Bridge
A	X82	Throckley express via Denton Burn & Walbottle
A	X85	Hexham express via A69 & Corbridge
B	10	Hexham via Teams, Metrocentre, Blaydon, Ryton, Crawcrook, Prudhoe, Stocksfield, Riding Mill & Corbridge
B	10A	Blackhall Mill via Teams, Metrocentre, Blaydon, Ryton, Crawcrook, Greenside, (Note: Journeys terminating at Greenside, Rockwood Hill Estate omit Woodside Lane.) High Spen & Chopwell
B	10B	Low Prudhoe via Teams, Metrocentre, Blaydon, Ryton, Crawcrook & Prudhoe
B	X43	Stanley via Metrocentre, Swalwell, Whickham, Crookgate, Burnhopfield, Tantobie & Tanfield Lea
C	6	Lanchester via Teams, Metrocentre, Swalwell, Whickham, Sunniside, Crookgate, Burnopfield, Tantobie, Tanfield Lea, Stanley, South Moor, Quaking Houses, (Note: Evening (weekday & Saturday) journeys serve Quaking Houses.) Burnhope & Maiden Law
C	47	Consett via Teams, Metrocentre, Swalwell, Winlaton Mill, Rowlands Gill, Highfield, High Spen, Chopwell, Blackhall Mill, Ebchester, Shotley Bridge & Bridgehill
C	X45	Consett express via Metrocentre, Swalwell, Winlaton Mill, Rowlands Gill, Hamsterley Mill, Ebchester, Shotley Bridge & Blackhill
D	X30	Stanley express via Dunston, Whickham, Sunniside & Shield Row
D	X31	Stanley express via Dunston, Whickham, Sunniside & East Stanley
D	X32	Consett express via Gateshead, Lobley Hill, Sunniside & East Stanley
D	X70	Consett express via Gateshead, Lobley Hill, Sunniside, Crookgate, Burnopfield, Tantobie, Flint Hill, Dipton & Leadgate
D	X71	Consett express via Dunston, Whickham, Sunniside, Crookgate, Burnopfield, Medomsley & Leadgate
D	X71A	Consett express via Gateshead, Lobley Hill, Sunniside, Crookgate, Burnopfield, Medomsley & Leadgate
D	X72	Stanley express via Gateshead, Lobley Hill, Sunniside, Crookgate, Burnopfield, Tantobie, Flint Hill, Dipton, Catchgate & Annfield Plain
D	X73	Stanley express via Metrocentre, Swalwell, Whickham, Crookgate, Tanfield, Tantobie, Flint Hill, Dipton, Catchgate & Annfield Plain
E	X1	South Hetton or Peterlee express via Gateshead, QE Hospital, Wrekenton, Springwell Village, Washington Galleries, Herrington Burn, Houghton-le-Spring, Hetton-le-Hole, Easington Lane, South Hetton & Easington Village
E	X1A	Dalton Park express via Gateshead, QE Hospital, Wrekenton, Springwell Village, Washington Galleries, Herrington Burn, Houghton-le-Spring, Hetton-le-Hole, Easington Lane & Murton
E	X1B	Picktree Village express via Gateshead, QE Hospital, Wrekenton, Springwell Village & Washington Galleries
E	X10	Middlesbrough express via Gateshead, Heworth, Dalton Park, Peterlee, Billingham, Norton & Stockton-on-Tees
F	22	Chester-le-Street via Gateshead, Low Fell, Wrekenton, Eighton Banks, Portobello & Barley Mow
F	28	Chester-le-Street via Gateshead, QE Hospital, Wrekenton, Eighton Banks, Birtley, Ouston, Pelton, Beamish, (Note: During opening hours, services operate via Beamish Museum.) Grange Villa & Pelton Fell
F	28B	Chester-le-Street via Gateshead, Low Fell, Kibblesworth, Birtley, Ouston, Pelton, Newfield, Grange Villa & Pelton Fell
F	29	Chester-le-Street via Gateshead, Bensham, Saltwell Park, Low Fell, Kibblesworth, Ouston, Pelton, Beamish, (Note: During opening hours, services operate via Beamish Museum.) Grange Villa & Pelton Fell
F	X12	Middlesbrough express via Gateshead, Low Fell, Birtley, Chester-le-Street, Plawsworth, Framwellgate Moor, Durham, Shincliffe, Bowburn, Coxhoe, Sedgefield, Hardwick, Stockton-on-Tees & Teesside Park
F	X21	West Auckland express via Gateshead, Low Fell, Chester-le-Street, Plawsworth, Framwellgate Moor, Durham, Neville's Cross, Croxdale, Tudhoe, Spennymoor, Bishop Auckland & Tindale Crescent
G	21	Brandon (Note: A frequent service operates between Newcastle and Chester-le-Street, with some services extending to Brandon (weekdays and Saturday daytime) or Durham.) via Gateshead, Low Fell, Harlow Green, Angel of the North, Birtley, Barley Mow, Chester-le-Street, Plawsworth, Arnison Centre, (Note: Some early morning & late evening journeys omit Arnison Centre.) Framwellgate Moor, Durham, Neville's Cross & Langley Moor
H	X74	Jedburgh express via Cowgate, Kenton Bar, Woolsington, Newcastle Airport, Ponteland, Belsay, Kirkwhelpington, Knowesgate, Otterburn, Rochester, Byrness, Carter Bar & Camptown
H	X77	Darras Hall express via Cowgate, Kenton Bar, Kingston Park, Woolsington, Newcastle Airport & Ponteland
H	X78	Darras Hall express via Cowgate, Kenton Bar, Kingston Park, Woolsington, Newcastle Airport & Ponteland
H	X79	Kirkley Hall express via Cowgate, Kenton Bar, Kingston Park, Woolsington, Newcastle Airport & Ponteland
H	X87	Newbiggin Hall express via Cowgate & Blakelaw
H	X88	Newbiggin Hall express via Cowgate & Blakelaw
J	49	Newcastle Great Park via Gosforth, Regent Centre & Brunton Park
J	74	Hexham via Cowgate, Slatyford, Westerhope, Callerton, Ponteland, Darras Hall, Medburn, Dalton, Stamfordham, Matfen, Great Whittington & Oakwood
J	X47	Newcastle Great Park express via Cowgate, Kenton Bar & Kingston Park
