= Jimmy Clough =

English footballer

Personal information
- Full name: James Clough
- Date of birth: 30 August 1918
- Place of birth: Hazlerigg, Northumberland, England
- Date of death: 2 September 1998 (aged 80)
- Place of death: Newcastle upon Tyne, England
- Position: Left winger

Youth career
- Seaton Burn

Senior career*
Years	Team	Apps	(Gls)
1938–1947	Southport	45	(10)
1947–1949	Crystal Palace	67	(12)
1949–1950	Southend United	34	(7)
1950–1951	Barrow	17	(3)
1951–?	Blyth Spartans		
- * Club domestic league appearances and goals

James Clough (30 August 1918 – 2 September 1998) was an English professional footballer who played as a winger.

== Career ==
He made a total of 163 appearances in the Football League for Southport, Crystal Palace, Southend United and Barrow, scoring 32 goals. He also played non-league football for Blyth Spartans.

== Death ==
Clough died in 1998 at the age of 80.
