= Newcastle Aviation Academy =

Newcastle Aviation Academy is an off-site university campus located at Newcastle International Airport. It was officially opened in March 2009 by Alan Johnson MP. The main aim of the academy is to supply the aircraft industry with more trained engineers.

Facilities include a working Boeing 737-200, Piper Aztec, 2 Jet Provosts, Jetstream, workshops, classrooms, a computer lab and staff with experience in the aviation industry. The academy is operated by Newcastle College, and offers further and higher education courses validated by NCG.

In 2018 it was awarded the Queen's Anniversary Prize for vocational education as part of Newcastle College's Transport Academy.
