= Hazlerigg =

Village in Tyne and Wear, England

Coordinates: 55.0429°N 1.6310°W

- Location within Tyne and Wear
- Population: 1,114
- OS grid reference: NZ232719
- Civil parish: Hazlerigg
- Metropolitan borough: Newcastle-upon-Tyne; North Tyneside
- Metropolitan county: Tyne and Wear
- Region: North East
- Country: England
- Sovereign state: United Kingdom
- Post town: NEWCASTLE UPON TYNE
- Postcode district: NE13
- Dialling code: 0191
- Police: Northumbria
- Fire: Tyne and Wear
- Ambulance: North East
- UK Parliament: Newcastle North; Cramlington & Killingworth

Hazlerigg (often misspelled Hazelrigg) is a village and civil parish north of the City of Newcastle upon Tyne in Tyne and Wear, England. It is about 5 miles (8.0 km) north of the city centre, on the A1. It is split between Newcastle upon Tyne and North Tyneside, each side of the A1 being a different district. The parish council administer the Newcastle side, whereas the area located in North Tyneside is unparished. Much of the Newcastle Great Park development is within the area administered by the Hazlerigg Parish Council.

Located in the village is a post office, a fish & chip shop, a beauty salon, a hairdresser, a garage, a convenience store and a social club that is now open under new management. In spite of having a population of 1,053, and almost 800 homes, Hazlerigg has never had a pub. The population of the civil Parish taken at the 2021 Census was 1,114.

The village Community Centre is located at the west of the village next to the 'show field', formerly the site of the annual village Gala. A football field is located between Hazlerigg and the neighbouring Brunswick Village. Although Brunswick Village is only a 2-minute walk from Hazlerigg, the journey may take longer by car as there is no direct road linking the two villages, as they were once separated by a railway line for coal wagons. The path between the villages now follows the route of this wagonway. The shortest journey by road is two miles via Wideopen and the old Great North Road. The village is now being expanded by a large housing development called Havannah Park to the west, across the road from the Havannah Nature Reserve.

== History ==
Hazlerigg was once the site of a colliery, which was in use from 1892 to 1964. The village prospered due to the export business thriving within it. Local houses for miners were built and they founded the village seen today by visitors and inhabitants. The site of Hazlerigg Colliery is now covered by trees, immediately to the west of the village.

There was a second and newer coal mine a mile further to the west of Hazlerigg, known as the Havannah Drift Mine, which was opened in 1950. There were concerns that subsidence from the mining was threatening the runway of Newcastle Airport, and the pit closed in 1977. Many of its buildings survive and are now part of a plastics factory. A large area of the surrounding land is now the Havannah Nature Reserve to the south of Coach Lane.

The village nature of Hazlerigg is threatened by the encroaching Newcastle Great Park development to the south, built on what was formerly Green Belt land.

== Education ==
The nearest school is Hazlewood Community Primary School, which most of the village children attend until Year 6.

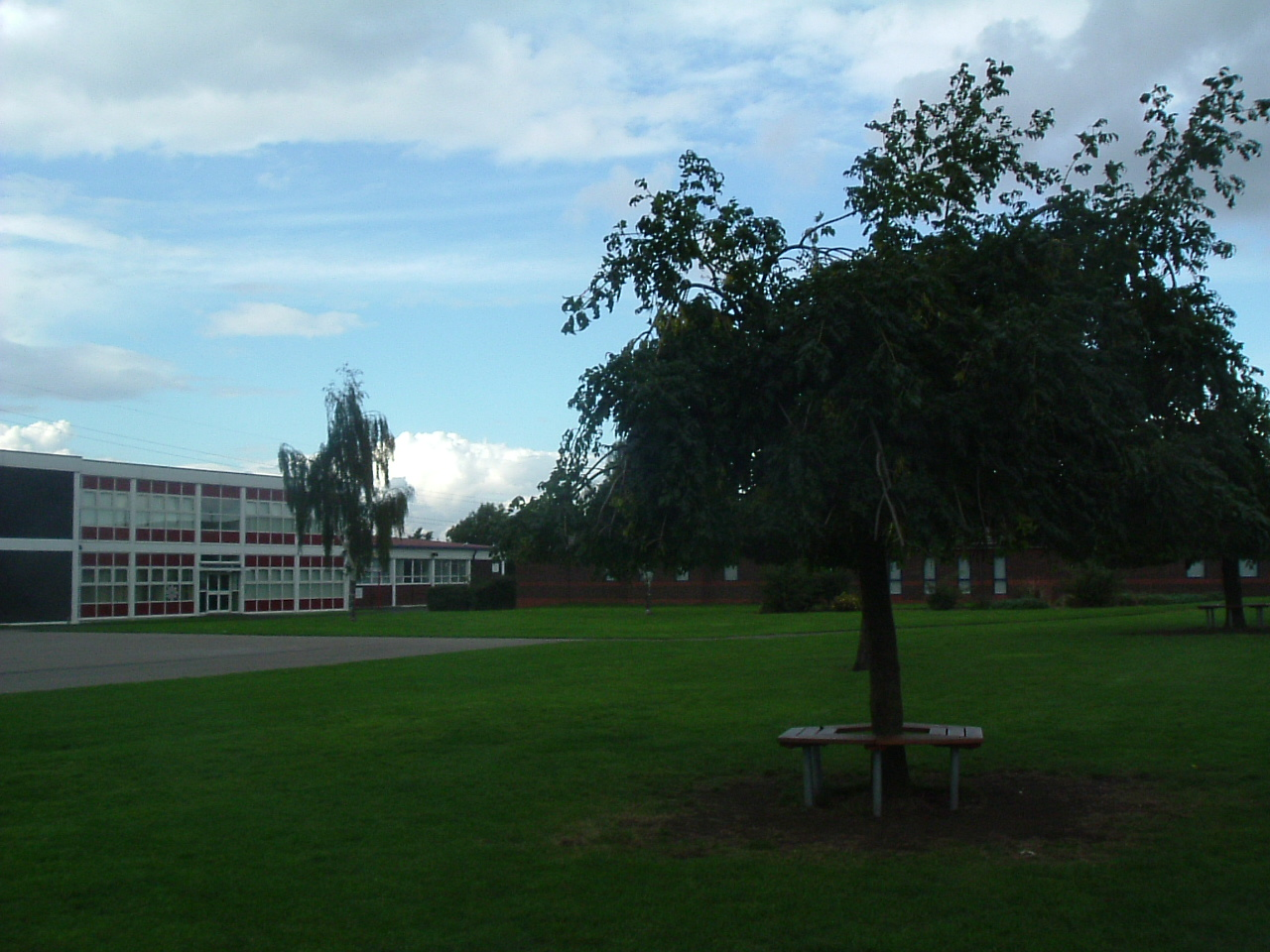
Hazlewood Community Primary School, the school most of the 3- to 11-year-olds in the village attend
