= Newcastle City Centre =

City centre of Newcastle upon Tyne, England

Coordinates: 54.9757°N 1.6103°W

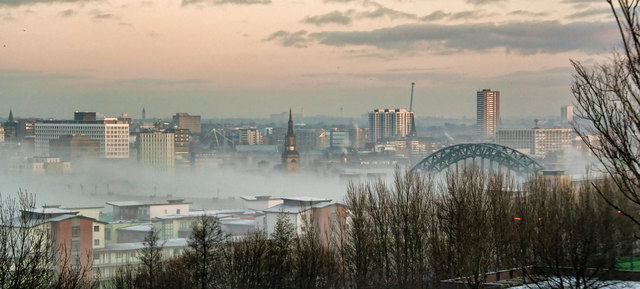
Newcastle City Centre skyline

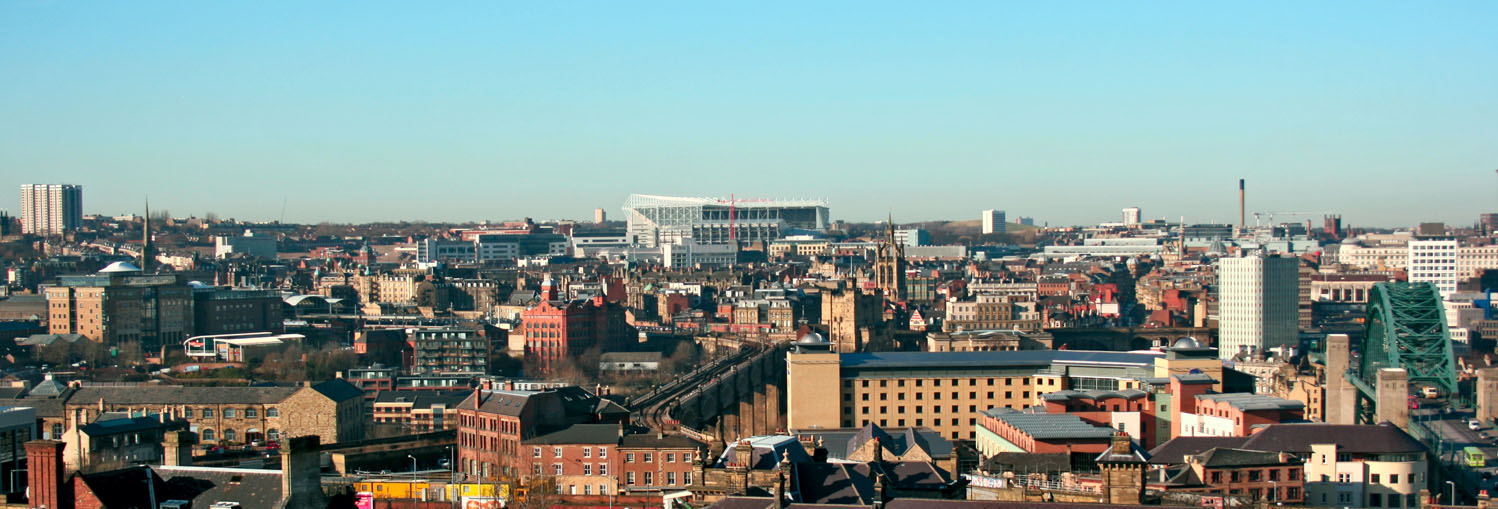
Newcastle City Centre panorama

Newcastle City Centre is the city centre district of Newcastle upon Tyne, England. It is the historical heart of the city and serves as the main cultural and commercial centre of the North East England region. The city centre forms the core of the Tyneside conurbation.

The city centre district is sometimes subdivided into the areas of Haymarket, Quayside, Grainger Town, Monument, Gallowgate, and Chinatown.

== Areas ==
=== Haymarket ===
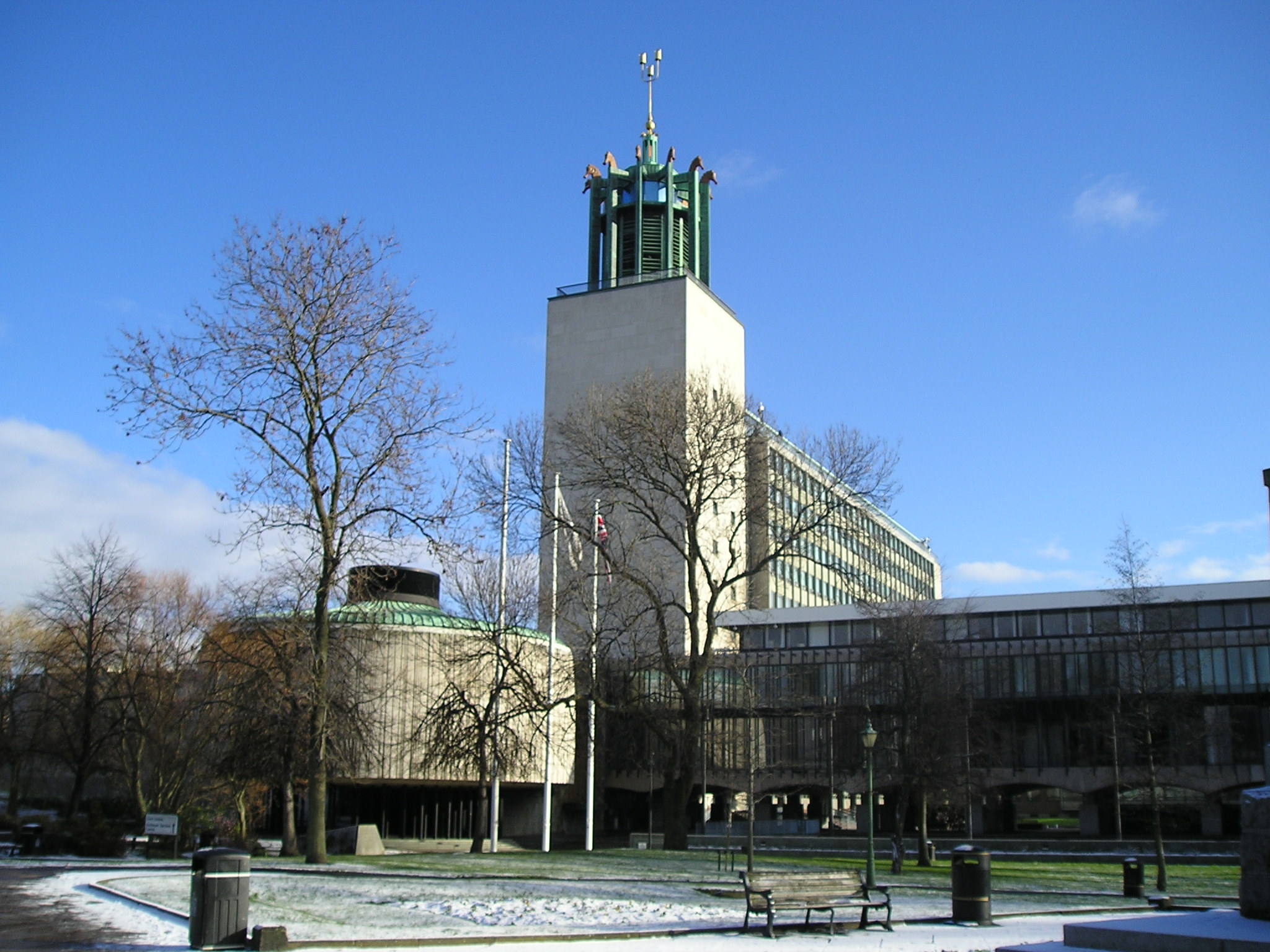
Newcastle Civic Centre, Haymarket

Haymarket is the northern edge of the city centre bordered by Spital Tongues and Jesmond to the north west and north east respectively. It is the location of Newcastle Civic Centre, Newcastle University, Northumbria University, Haymarket bus station and the City Pool, and is mainly a business area. The Church of St Thomas the Martyr is a prominent landmark in the area opposite the Metro station at the northern end of Northumberland Street, the city's main shopping street.

=== Quayside ===
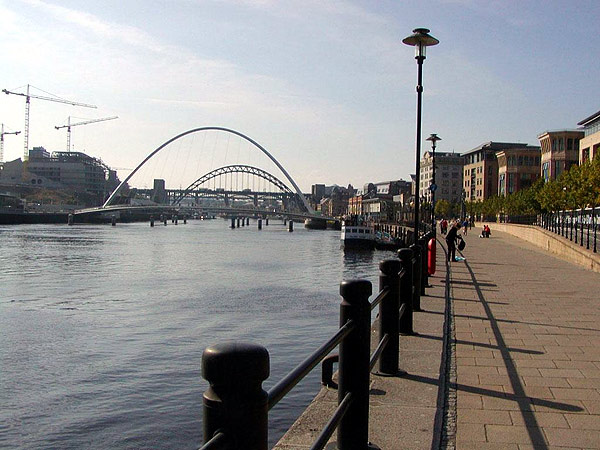
Quayside

The Quayside is a more modern part of Newcastle city centre known for its bars and restaurants.

Four bridges cross the River Tyne at the Quayside: The High Level Bridge, the Swing Bridge, the Tyne Bridge and the Gateshead Millennium Bridge.

The QuayLink bus route links the area with Monument and Haymarket and Central station, Gateshead metro stations.

The path along the river forms part of the cycle network eastwards towards North Shields and Tynemouth and westwards to Hexham.

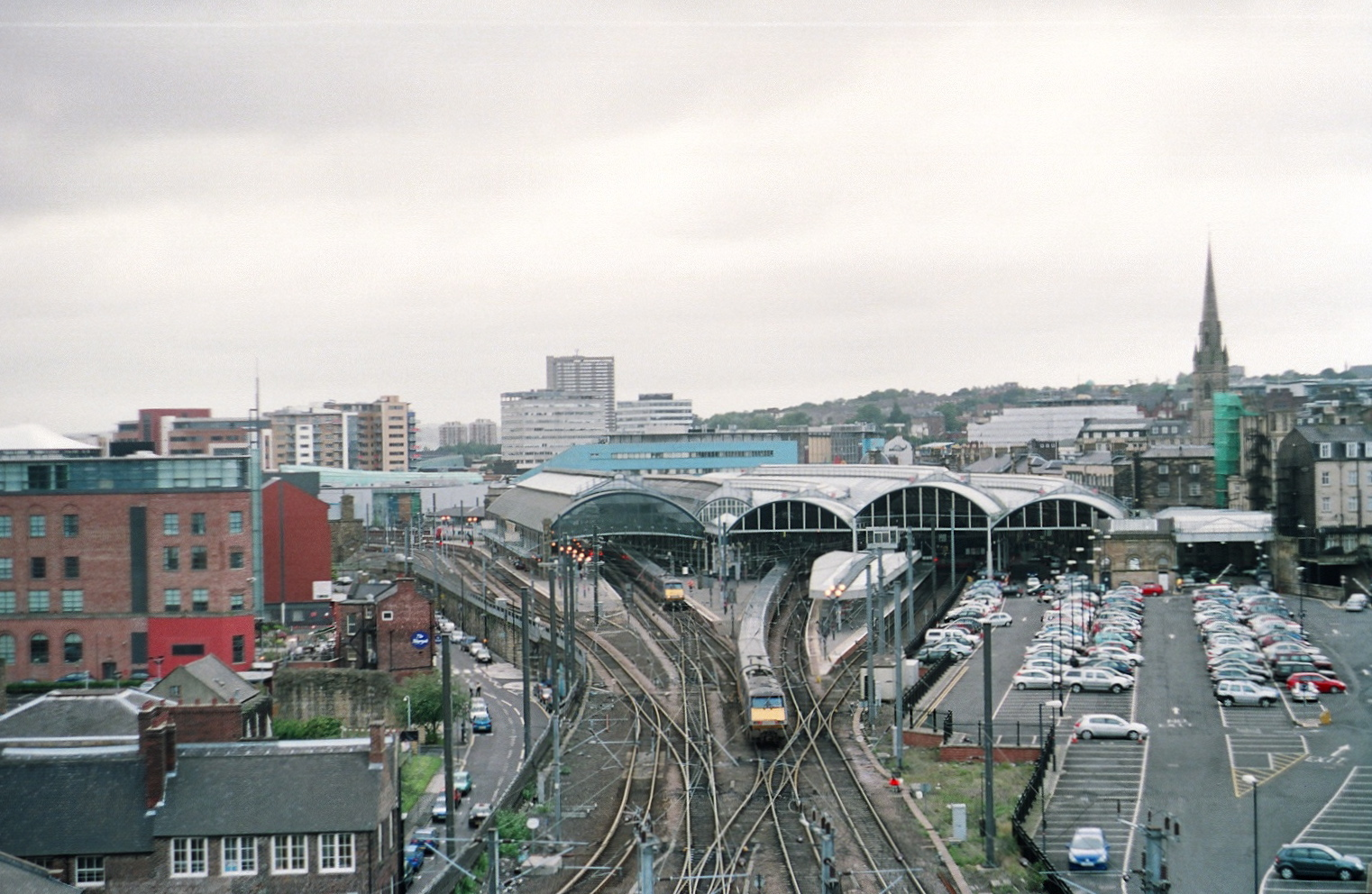
Newcastle railway station

=== Central Station ===
Newcastle railway station, or locally known as Central station, is surrounded by an assortment of bars and clubs. Towards the western end is the city's popular Gay District known locally as the Pink Triangle. The Centre for Life on Times Square, Utilita Arena Newcastle, Newcastle Cathedral, Discovery Museum and the Mill Volvo Tyne Theatre are all located in the vicinity, as is the city's coach station.

=== Grainger Town ===
The building housing the Central Arcade

Grainger Town is the streets between, and encompassing, Pilgrim Street, Clayton Street and Blackett Street. It was built in the mid-19th century and, today, is an area centred on shopping, nightlife and most notable neo-classical architecture. The Theatre Royal is situated on Grey Street. The Grainger Market is a covered market built to house the traders displaced during the re-modelling of the city.

Chinatown arch

=== Gallowgate ===
Gallowgate is a small area surrounding St James' Park, the stadium of Newcastle United F.C, and St James Metro station, named after the main road running through the area. There are a small number of pubs in the area but it is not a major area of residence, except for some student accommodation. Businesses include and various law firms in Citygate and the recently built Time Central, a Tesco Express store, fish and sandwich shops. Behind it is Leazes Park that leads to Spital Tongues. The area is also to host a 400 square metre memorial garden to Sir Bobby Robson. Work began on it in November 2010, with it due to be opened in Spring 2011.

=== Chinatown ===
Chinatown is on the western edge of the city centre centred on Stowell Street with a number of Chinese restaurants and the rear entrance to The Gate.

== Transport ==
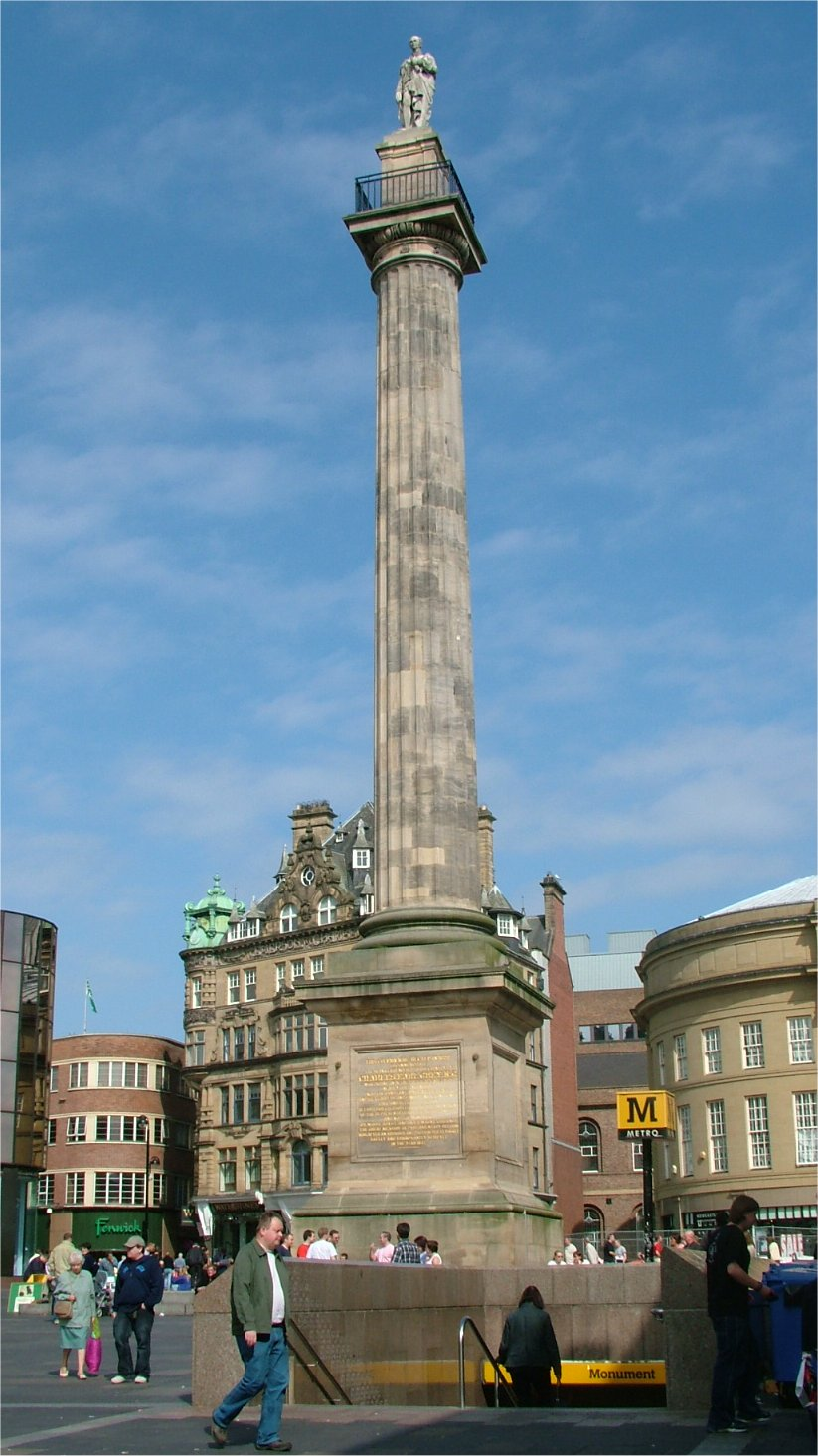
Monument Metro station southern entrance

=== Metro ===
The Tyne and Wear Metro has four stations in Newcastle city centre which are all underground. Running north to south, Haymarket, Monument and Central Station are on both the Green and Yellow lines which run northbound to the Airport or towards the coast via Whitley Bay and southbound to South Hylton or South Shields.

St James is the western terminus of the Yellow Line and precedes Monument. Trains run towards the coast via North Shields.

=== Bus and coach ===
Newcastle has two bus stations for local and regional terminating bus services. Services heading north and east generally use Haymarket bus station, whilst those to the south and west use Eldon Square bus station. Both bus stations are operated by Nexus.

Many roads in the city centre are for buses only or have bus lanes. Stagecoach is the predominant operator for bus services within the city, which tend to call at several stops in the city centre rather than at a bus station. The QuayLink service, with its bright yellow electric buses, has two routes – Q1 from Haymarket to Quayside and Q2 from Central Station to Gateshead.

For long-distance coach services, National Express uses Newcastle Coach Station on St James Boulevard, and Megabus used to stop outside Central Station. Now they stop on John Dobson Street outside the library.

=== Rail ===
Newcastle, known locally as Central, is the city's mainline railway station and a principal stop on the East Coast Main Line From there, local, regional and national destinations are served directly. Manors is the only other station in the city, but it has a very limited service.
