= Newcastle Sixth Form College =

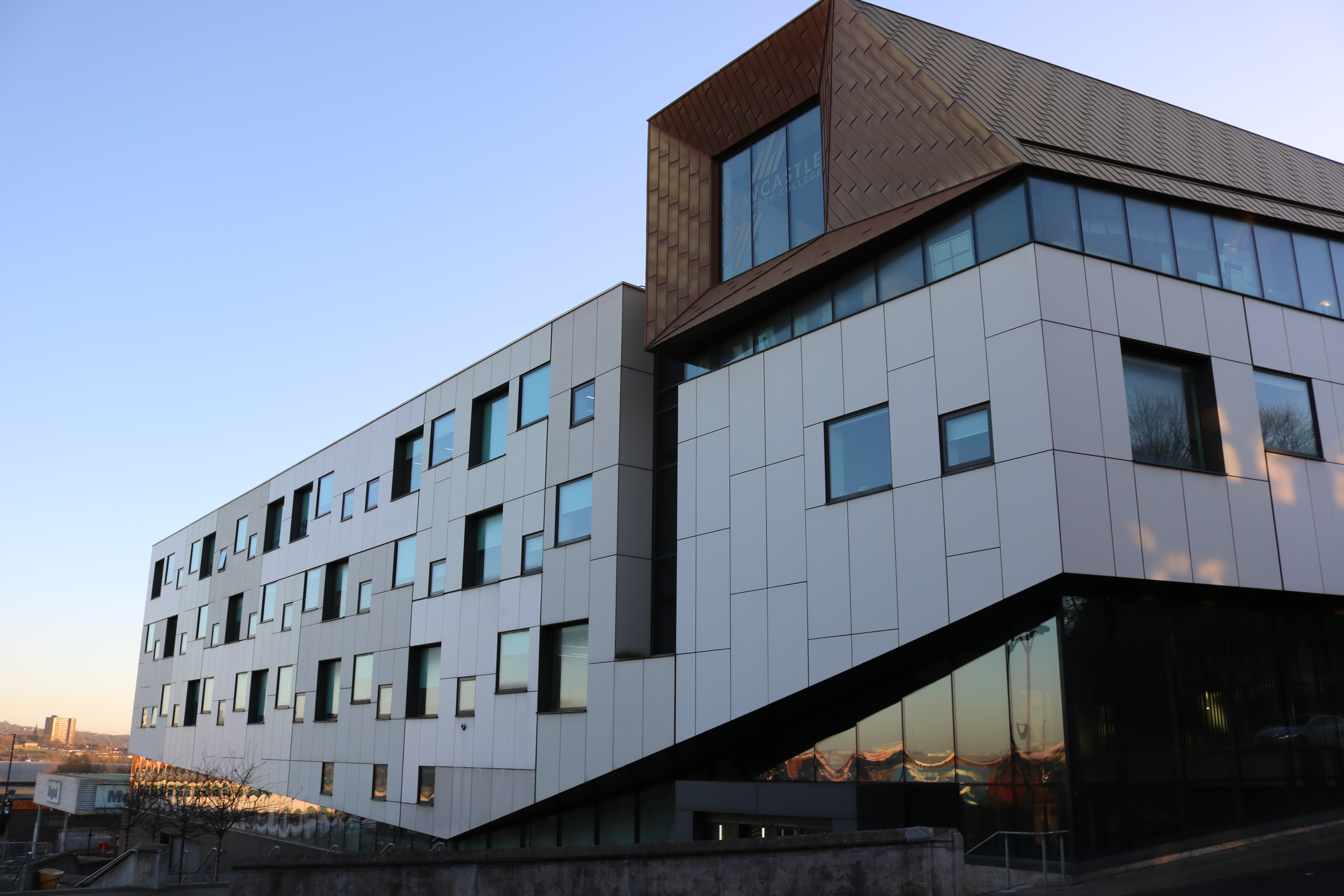
- The Newcastle sixth form college building from outside

Location
- Westmorland Road, Elswick, Newcastle upon Tyne, NE4 7SA; England; 54.96848°N 1.62768°W

Information
- Type: Further Education
- Established: 2014
- Department for Education URN: 142480 Tables
- Ofsted: Reports
- Chair: Paul Atkinson
- Principal: James Edge
- Staff: 100
- Gender: Mixed
- Age: 16 to 19
- Enrolment: 1400 students
- Website: www.newcastlesixthformcollege.ac.uk

Newcastle Sixth Form College is a sixth-form college in Newcastle upon Tyne, England. Opened in March 2014, the college forms part of the larger organisation Newcastle College. It offers around 26 different A-Level subjects, as well as an access to A-Levels and GCSEs programme.

The college is on Westmorland Road, in Newcastle City Centre. Because it is close to both Central Station Metro station and Newcastle Central Station, the college attracts students from across Tyneside and surrounding regions including Northumberland and Sunderland.

The college is a member of NCG group with the neighbouring Newcastle College and five other colleges.

== Facilities ==
- Dance and drama studios
- Digital media centre
- Science laboratories
- Art and design workshops
- Art and design studio space
- Art exhibition space
- Darkroom
- Interactive whiteboards
- Debating chamber
- Costa Coffee outlet
- Library
