= Havannah Nature Reserve =

English nature reserve

Coordinates: 55.04035°N 1.65398°W

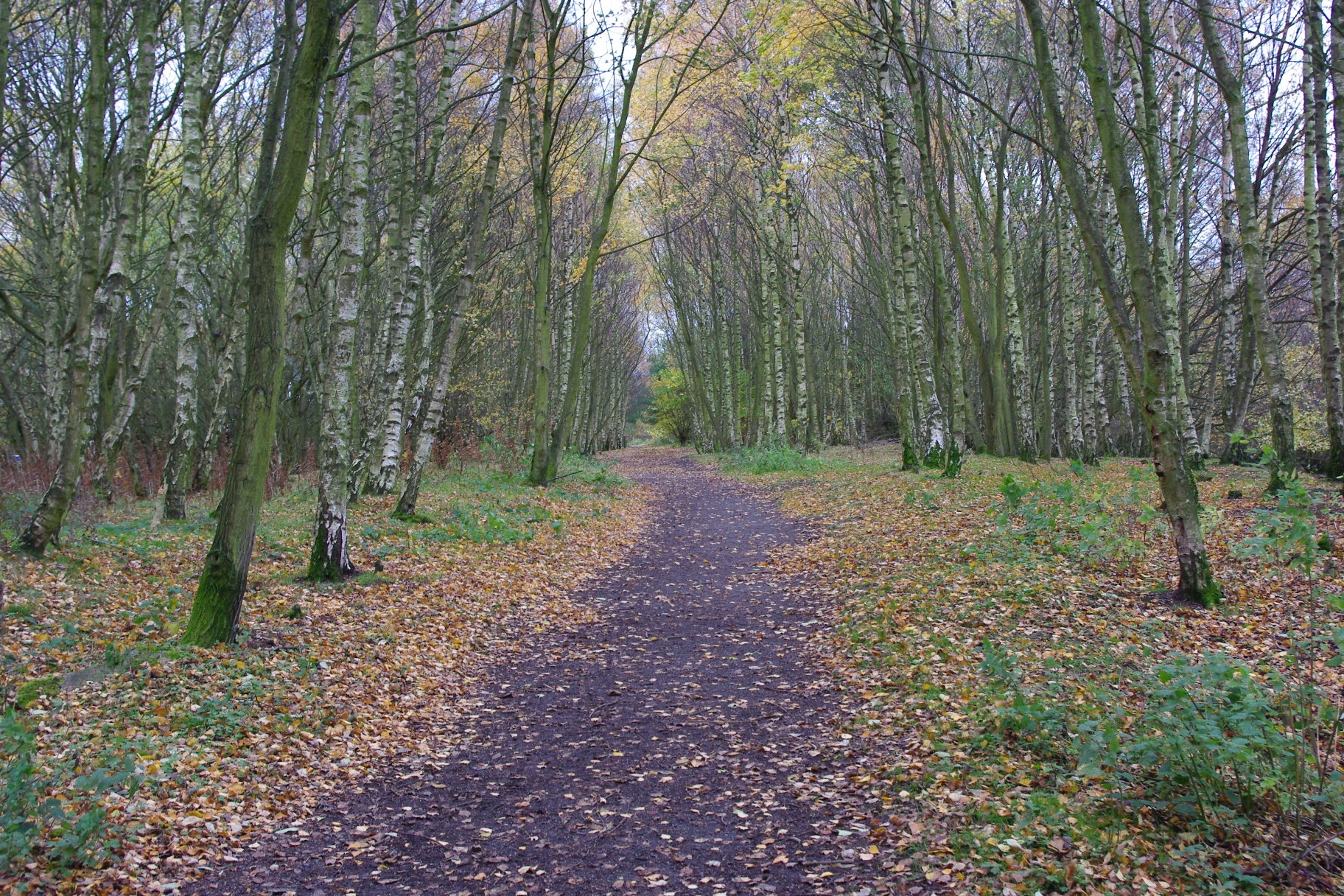
A path through Havannah Nature Reserve

Havannah Nature Reserve lies to the west of the village of Hazlerigg, approximately five miles north of the centre of Newcastle upon Tyne in the north of England. It was declared a nature reserve in 1998 and is designated a Site of Local Conservation Interest. A wildlife corridor runs through the site.

Owned by Newcastle City Council and managed by Urban Green Newcastle, it is often referred to as Havannah and Three Hills Nature Reserve, so called after the drift mine and the slag heaps, which were located at the site when Hazlerigg Colliery was operational, from 1892 to 1964.

== Location ==
The site is an oblong area roughly 1.3 kilometres (0.81 mi) east-west and 0.3 kilometres (0.19 mi) north-south, with Hazlerigg forming the east boundary; Main Road the western boundary between it and the eastern extent of Newcastle Airport; and Coach Lane the northern boundary. A triangular extension of the site descends south to a point on the boundary with the former Sage Group campus.

== Ecology ==
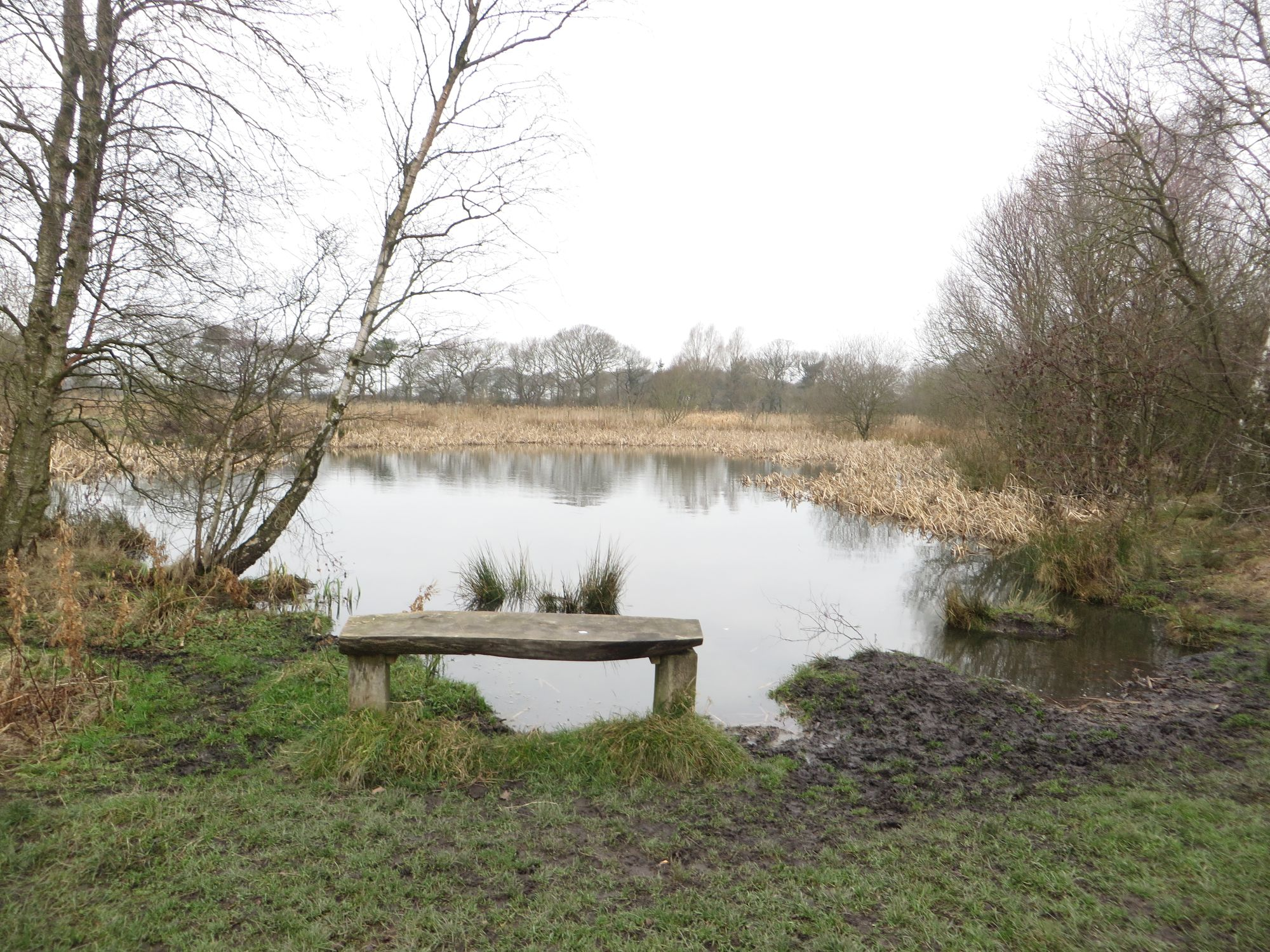
A pond near the western end of Havannah Nature Reserve

It is one of only two areas of lowland heath in Newcastle. Much of the landscape is a result of the site's industrial past, and many of the wet areas result from subsidence associated with mining activity. There is great biodiversity within the site, which has around 40 hectares of habitat including woodlands, meadows, scrub, grazed fields, marshland and ponds. Several smaller ponds have been added in recent years, and the hydrology of the site has changed much due to subsidence associated with mining activity. The diverse range of habitat provides for populations of plants and animals of local, regional and national importance.

The woodland consists of broadleaf and coniferous trees. An abundance of coniferous trees provides habitat for red squirrels, which are breeding successfully in the reserve. A section of land has been fenced off at the top of the Three Hills part of the reserve, to keep dogs and people separate from the squirrels' breeding area. The wooden fencing was flattened in several places by fallen trees that had been blown over by Storm Arwen in November 2021. Newcastle is one of the last urban areas with a population of red squirrels, and Havannah Nature Reserve is one of only three places within the city area that supports them. The red squirrel is a legally protected species and is covered by Schedules 5 and 6 of the Wildlife & Countryside Act 1981.

The other two sites that provide red squirrel habitat in Newcastle are Woolsington Woods and Gosforth Park Nature Reserve. In 2011, housing developer Bellway Homes submitted a planning application to North Tyneside Council for proposed development adjacent to Gosforth Park Nature Reserve, approximately 2 miles southeast of Havannah Nature Reserve. The local group Save Gosforth Wildlife campaigned against the plans, which did not go ahead and as a result there is a local precedent for concerns about housing developments adjacent to red squirrel habitat. In 2014, a planning application was submitted for a housing development at Woolsington, which would have involve felling over 1,000 mature trees in Woolsington Woods, approximately 3 miles west of Havannah Nature Reserve.

Havannah Nature Reserve also provides habitat for the Dingy Skipper butterfly, which is covered under section 41 (England) of the Natural Environment and Rural Communities Act (2006) and on the UK list of Priority Habitats and Species. The ponds and ditches provide habitat for breeding populations of great crested newt, which is a European protected species. Yellowhammer birds, a species on the UK red list of Birds of Conservation Concern, can be seen and heard in the bushes and hedgerows around the scrubland within the reserve.

== Development proposal ==
In 2015, the Banks Property Group developer submitted a planning application for permission to build up to 500 houses directly opposite Havannah Nature Reserve. Local wildlife conservation groups objected to the plans, including the Northumberland Wildlife Trust, the Natural History Society of Northumbria and the campaign groups Save Gosforth Wildlife and Save Newcastle Wildlife.

From 2018, a large housing development was built directly north of Havannah on the other side of Coach Lane, called Havannah Park.
