= Haymarket, Newcastle =

Area of Newcastle, UK

Coordinates: 54.9775°N 1.6139°W

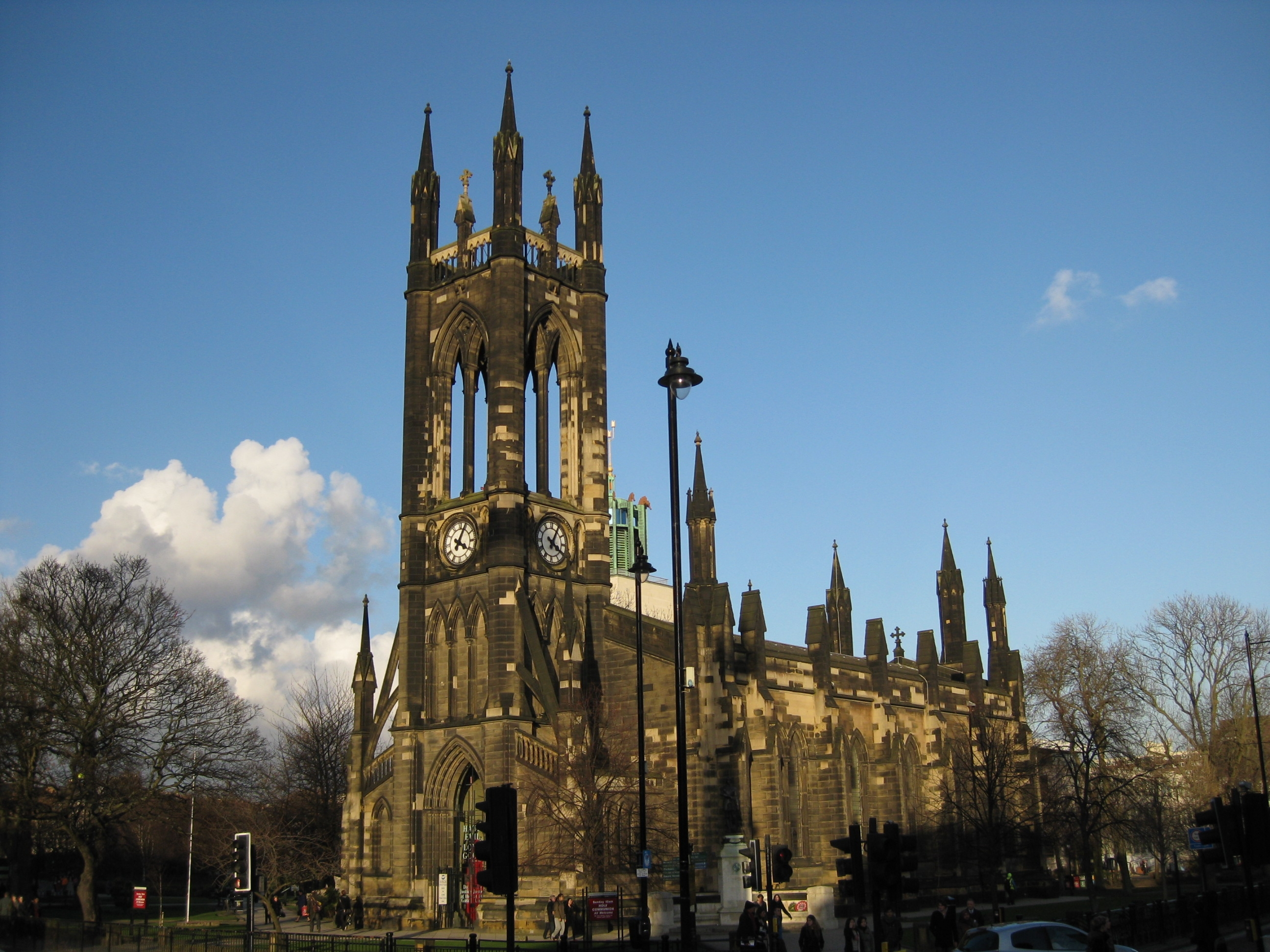
St Thomas' Church

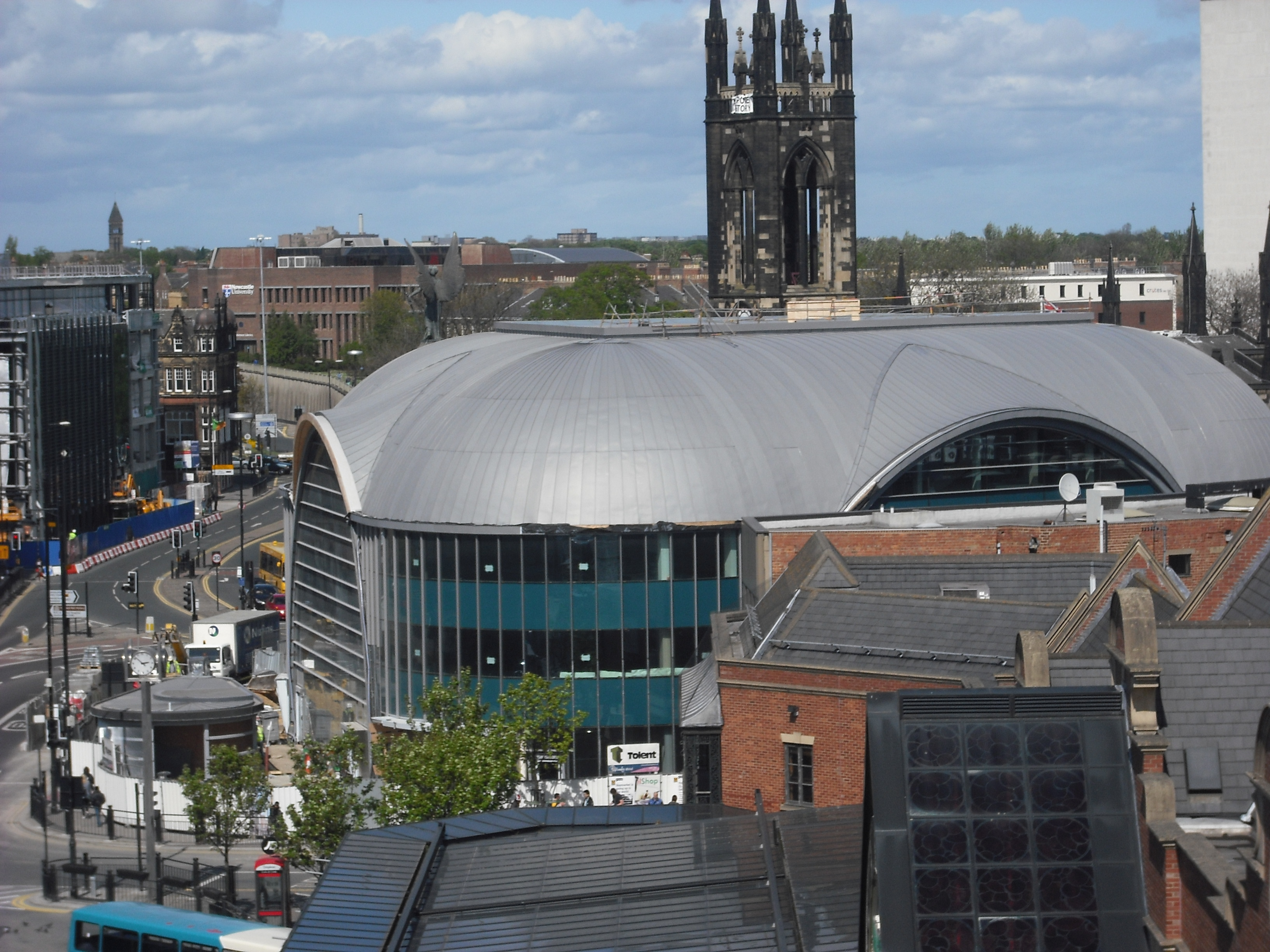
Haymarket Hub with parts of Newcastle University and St Thomas' Church in the background

Haymarket is an area in the north of central Newcastle upon Tyne. The area has several transport hubs including Eldon Square bus station, Haymarket bus station and Haymarket Metro station. Haymarket features the facades of Newcastle Civic Centre, Newcastle University and Northumbria University. It is also the location of the Church of St Thomas the Martyr, a prominent city landmark.

The area is home to various war memorials including The Response, 1914 by Goscombe John, described by Alan Borg, a former Director General of the Imperial War Museum as "one of the finest sculptural ensembles on any British monument."

The major pedestrianised shopping street, Northumberland Street, meets Haymarket at its northern end.

== Redevelopment of Haymarket ==
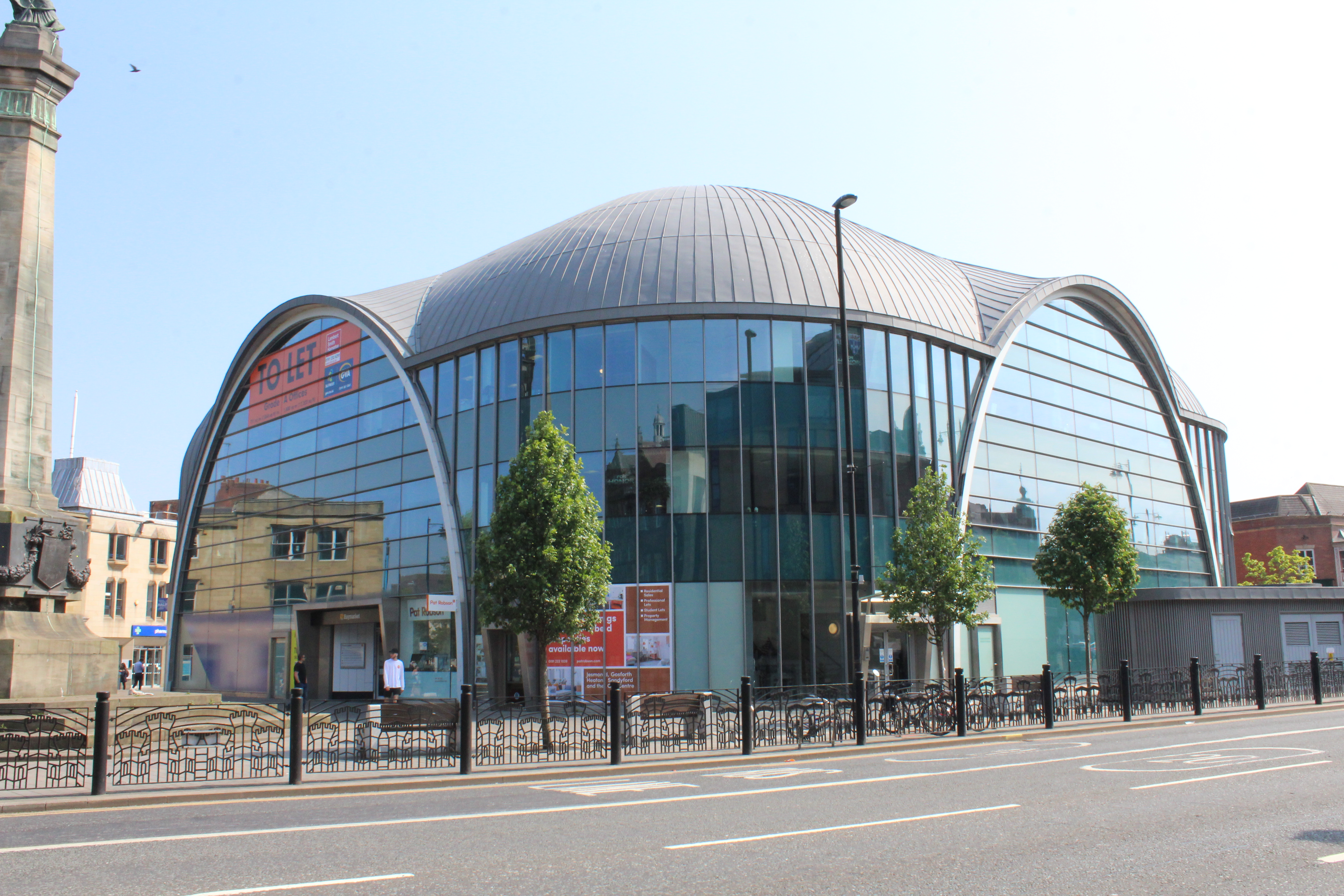
Haymarket Metro Station in 2018

Haymarket Metro station was rebuilt at a cost of £20 million, and was officially reopened by the Princess Royal in 2010. The Haymarket Hub also included space for commercial units. It was nominated for the Carbuncle Cup in 2010.

In 1999, at a cost of £270,000, a piece of public art consisting of 52 men standing shoulder to shoulder as its name suggests, was installed around the Metro station area of Haymarket, functioning as a fence to section of the heavy traffic from pedestrianised areas. The sculpture incorporated a water feature, which was turned off due to budget constraints. In 2008 the figures were removed and stored on a piece of waste land close to the city centre. Some of the figures were eventually auctioned by the City Council on eBay in 2011.

In addition to the construction of the Haymarket hub, there are developments on the Newcastle University facade towards Haymarket, these are the INTO Newcastle buildings and the Student and Administrative Services Building, which opened in 2010.
