= Haymarket bus station, Newcastle upon Tyne =

Bus station in Newcastle, England

Haymarket Bus Station
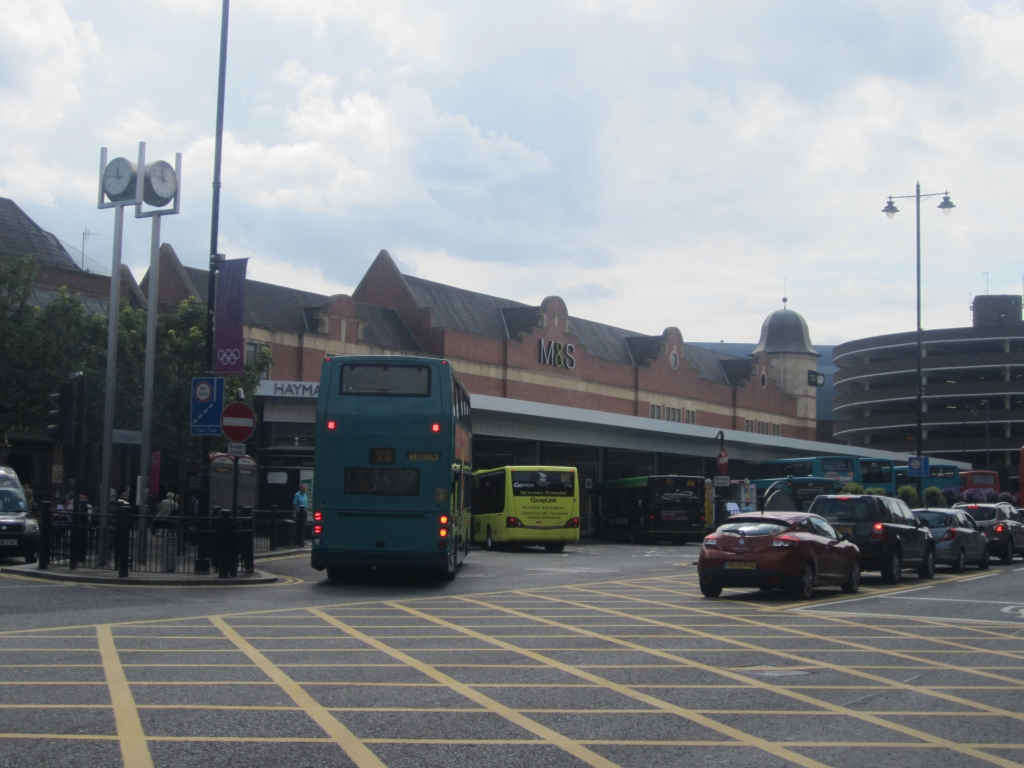

General information
- Location: Percy Street, Haymarket; Newcastle upon Tyne; England
- Coordinates: 54.9768°N 1.6145°W
- OS Grid ref: NZ 2477 6475
- Elevation: 49 m (161 ft)
- Owner: Newcastle City Council
- Operator: Nexus
- Bus stands: 14 (lettered L–Y + 1 unlettered)
- Bus operators: Arriva North East; Go North East
- Connections: Eldon Square bus station; Haymarket

Construction
- Accessible: Step-free access throughout

Other information
- Fare zone: Network One: 1; Transfare: Yellow
- Website: www.nexus.org.uk/bus/bus-stations-and-stops/haymarket-bus-station

Key dates
- 1930: Opened
- 1971: Replaced
- 1996: Rebuilt
Location
- Location within Newcastle-upon-Tyne Location within Tyne and Wear

Haymarket bus station is a bus station located in the Haymarket area of Newcastle upon Tyne. It is situated on Percy Street, adjacent to Haymarket Metro. It is a short walk from both Newcastle and Northumbria Universities, Newcastle Civic Centre and the Great North Museum: Hancock.

== History ==
The original bus station opened in 1930 and was rebuilt in 1971. It was completely rebuilt again, on a slightly different site, in 1996. This second rebuild was due to the expansion of the nearby Marks & Spencer shop, necessitating the demolition of a number of properties. The opportunity was taken to enlarge the bus station from 9 to 13 stands.

== Stands and services ==
The station has fourteen bus stands, twelve for departures (stands L to X), and two alighting points (Y & an unnamed bus parking stand). The bus stands continue the lettering sequence of nearby Eldon Square bus station (stands A–K; no I). A Nexus enquiry office is based within the bus station.

Haymarket bus station is mainly served by Arriva North East, with other routes operated by Go North East and independent operators. Services mainly operate to the north and east of the city, as well as North Tyneside and east Northumberland.

Buses from the nearby Eldon Square bus station serve destinations in the west of the city, as well as Gateshead, County Durham, Teesside and the Tyne Valley. Most long-distance coaches serve the separate Newcastle coach station.

As of May 2026, the stand allocation is:

| Stand | Route | Destination |
|---|---|---|
| L | 306 | Whitley Bay via Coast Road, Silverlink Retail Park, North Shields , Tynemouth & Marden Estate |
| L | 308 | Blyth via Coast Road, Silverlink Retail Park, North Tyneside Hospital, Whitley Bay & Seaton Sluice |
| M | 307 | North Shields via Coast Road, Cobalt Business Park & Meadow Well |
| M | 309 | Blyth via Coast Road, Cobalt Business Park, North Tyneside Hospital, Whitley Bay , & Seaton Sluice |
| N | 350 | Whitley Bay via Coast Road, Shiremoor , West Monkseaton & Monkseaton |
| N | 351 | Whitley Bay via Coast Road, Shiremoor , West Monkseaton & Whitley Lodge |
| N | X20 | Alnwick express via North Seaton, Ashington, Wansbeck Hospital, Amble & Alnmouth |
| N | X39 (Note: Peak-time journey(s) only.) | Cobalt Business Park express via Coast Road |
| P | X21 (Note: Some early-morning and evening services terminate at Woodhorn instead.) | Newbiggin-by-the-Sea express via Bedlington, Stakeford, Ashington, Wansbeck Hospital & Woodhorn |
| P | X22 (Note: Some evening services terminate at Cresswell instead.) | Widdrington express via Bedlington, Guide Post, North Seaton, Ashington, Wansbeck Hospital, Cresswell & Ellington |
| Q | X14 | Thropton express via Regent Centre, Morpeth , Longhorsley, Cragside House (Note: Some journeys operate via Cragside House.) & Rothbury |
| Q | X15 | Berwick-upon-Tweed express via Regent Centre, Morpeth , Shilbottle, Alnwick , Belford, Beal, Haggerston, & Tweedmouth |
| Q | X16 (Note: Some journeys continue to Wooler or Kelso via Longhorsley & Longframlington.) | Morpeth express via Regent Centre, & Stannington |
| Q | X18 | Berwick-upon-Tweed express via Regent Centre, Morpeth , Pegswood , Widdrington , Acklington, Amble, Alnmouth , Alnwick , Craster, Embleton, Beadnell, Seahouses, Bamburgh, Belford, Beal, Haggerston & Tweedmouth |
| R | Q3 | Brunton Park via Jesmond, Gosforth & Regent Centre |
| R | Q3X | Brunton Park express via Gosforth & Regent Centre |
| S | 43 | Morpeth via Gosforth, Regent Centre , Wideopen, Seaton Burn, Cramlington , Bedlington, & Stobhill |
| S | 44 | Dinnington via Gosforth, Regent Centre , Wideopen & Hazlerigg |
| S | 45 | Dinnington via Gosforth, Regent Centre , Wideopen & Brunswick Village |
| T | X46 | Brunton Park express via Gosforth, Regent Centre & Brunton Park |
| U | X10 | Blyth express via Regent Centre, Cramlington , Parkside & Newsham |
| U | X11 | Blyth express via Regent Centre, Cramlington , Parkside & Newsham |
| U | X30 (Note: Only peak-time journeys continue from Blyth to Bebside.) | Bebside express via Regent Centre, Newsham, Blyth & Cowpen |
| V | X7 | Blyth express via South Gosforth, Quorum Business Park, Seaton Delaval, Seaton Sluice & South Beach |
| V | X8 | Blyth express via South Gosforth, Quorum Business Park, Annitsford, Cramlington, South Newsham & South Beach |
| V | X9 | Blyth express via Regent Centre, Cramlington High Pit, Bebside & Cowpen |
| W | 54A (Note: Evenings and Sunday only.) | Whitley Bay via Gosforth, Killingworth , Shiremoor, Cobalt Business Park, North Tyneside Hospital & Monkseaton |
| W | 352 | Cramlington via Freeman Hospital, Four Lane Ends , Quorum Business Park, Killingworth & Dudley |
| W | 354 | North Shields via Gosforth, Four Lane Ends , Quorum Business Park, Killingworth, Shiremoor , Cobalt Business Park & Billy Mill |
| X | 355 | Forest Hall via Gosforth, Longbenton & Benton |
| X | 356 | Whitley Bay via Gosforth, Longbenton , Benton , Forest Hall, Killingworth , Shiremoor , North Tyneside Hospital & Monkseaton |

- Key:
- Bus station
- National Rail station
- Tyne & Wear Metro station

== Accidents and incidents ==
A design fault in the glass roof caused panels to flex and dislodge from the frame in hot weather. A safety net was erected below the entire roof in July 2006, after a panel fell from the roof and injured a pedestrian. Since then, the bus station has been redesigned, with the overhead glass panelling being replaced with a solid roof structure.
