= Newcastle coach station =

Coach station in Newcastle upon Tyne, England

Newcastle Coach Station
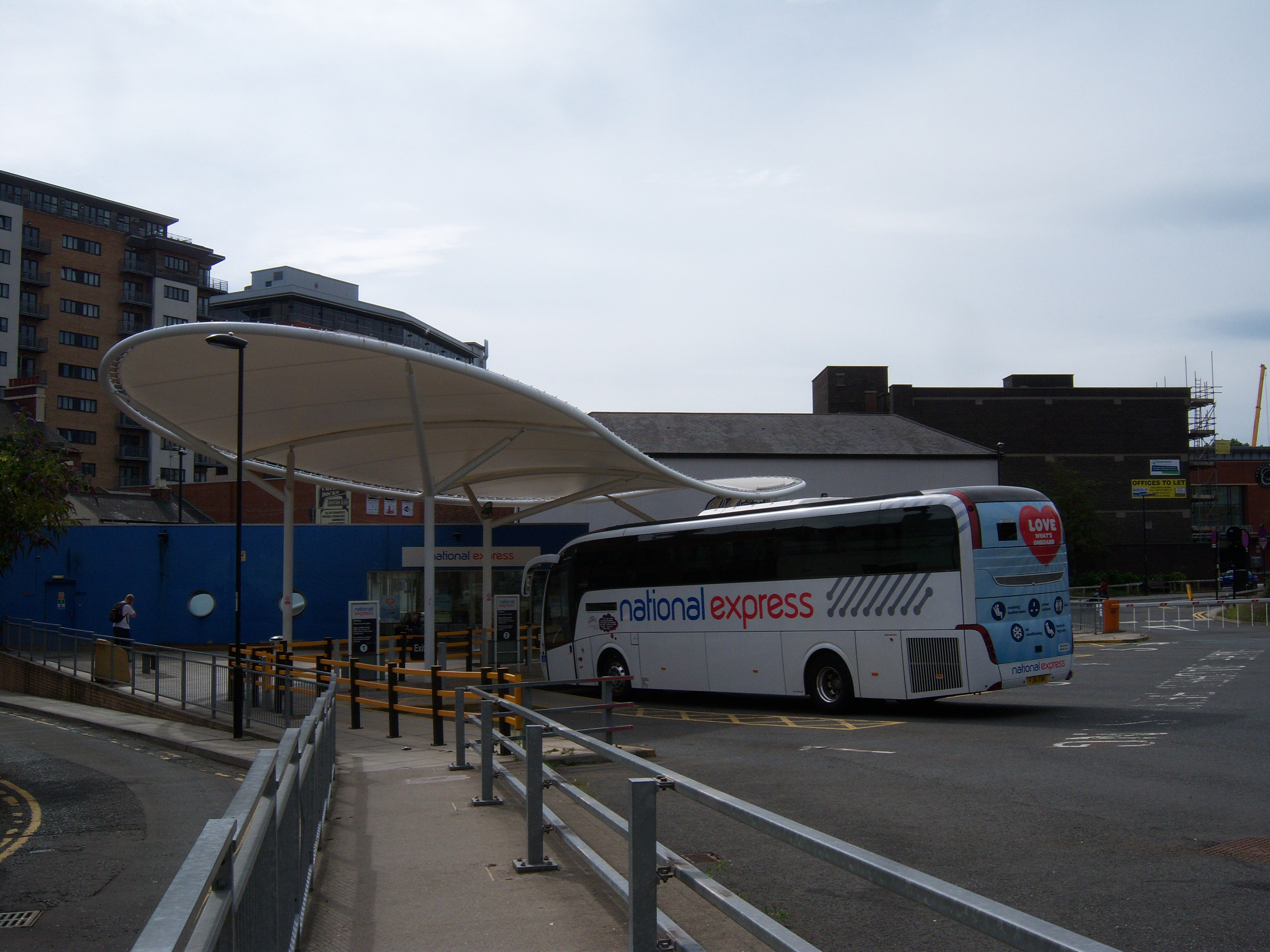

General information
- Location: Churchill Street; St. James Boulevard; Newcastle upon Tyne
- Coordinates: 54.9675°N 1.6226°W
- Owner: National Express
- Operator: National Express
- Bus stands: 5
- Connections: Central Station; Eldon Square; Haymarket

History
- Opened: 2003
Location
- Location within Tyne and Wear

Newcastle Coach Station is a coach station located in Newcastle upon Tyne. It opened in 2003, as a replacement for the former Gallowgate Coach Station.

The coach station is located on Churchill Street, and is a short walk from Newcastle railway station. It is one of three bus stations in the city centre – the others being Eldon Square and Haymarket.

The coach station has limited facilities, following the closure of the booking office, toilets and waiting area in 2021. A taxi rank is available on Churchill Street. Above the bays is a translucent curved canopy roof, with a glazed block screen wall.

Newcastle Coach Station is served mainly by National Express, however, it is also used by a number of independent operators – including JH Coaches and Wright Bros. of Alston. The station is not served by Megabus, with services instead using a stop on John Dobson Street, adjacent to Newcastle City Library.
