= Newcastle International Airport =

Airport in Newcastle upon Tyne, England

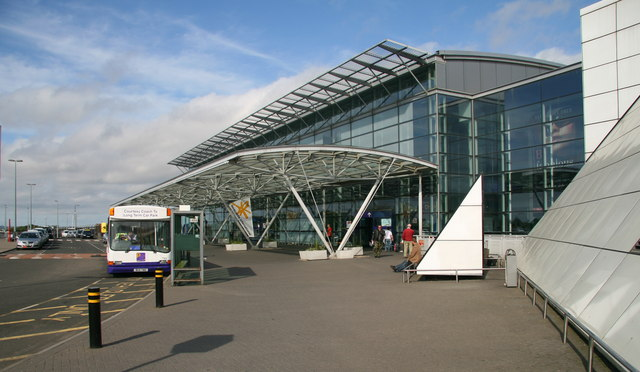
- IATA: NCL; ICAO: EGNT

Summary
- Airport type: Public
- Owner: Newcastle Airport Local Authority (51%); InfraBridge (49%)
- Operator: Newcastle International Airport Limited
- Serves: North East England; Cumbria; Scottish Borders
- Location: Woolsington, Newcastle upon Tyne, England
- Opened: 1967
- Hub for: Loganair
- Focus city for: easyJet; Jet2.com; Ryanair; TUI Airways
- Elevation AMSL: 266 ft (81 m)
- Coordinates: 55°02′17″N 001°41′23″W
- Website: www.newcastleairport.com

Map
- Location in Tyne and Wear NCL/EGNT (the United Kingdom)

Runways
Direction	Length		Surface
Direction	m	ft	Surface
07/25	2,330	7,644	Asphalt

Statistics (2025)
- Passengers: 5,480,401
- Passenger change 2024-25: ▲6.6%
- Aircraft movements: 48,552
- Movements change 2024-25: ▲3.7%
- Sources: UK AIP at NATS; Statistics from the Civil Aviation Authority

Newcastle International Airport (IATA: NCL, ICAO: EGNT) is an international airport serving Newcastle upon Tyne, England. Located approximately 7.7 mi (12.4 km) from Newcastle City Centre, it is the primary airport in North East England. In 2019, prior to the COVID-19 pandemic, Newcastle International handled 5.2 million passengers annually. By 2025, that number had recovered to 5.5 million.

Newcastle Airport has a Civil Aviation Authority Public Use Aerodrome Licence that allows flights for the public transport of passengers or for flying instruction.

== Ownership ==
The airport is owned by seven local authorities (51%) and InfraBridge (49%). The seven local authorities are: City of Newcastle, City of Sunderland, Durham County Council, Gateshead MBC, North Tyneside MBC, Northumberland County Council, and South Tyneside MBC. In October 2012 Copenhagen Airport sold its stake in the airport to InfraBridge. In December 2025, AENA agreed terms to purchase 49% of InfaBridge's shareholding. Pending regulatory approval, the sale is scheduled to be completed in the second quarter of 2026 with the seven local authorities to own 51% and InfraBridge 25% and AENA 24%.

== History ==
=== Early years ===
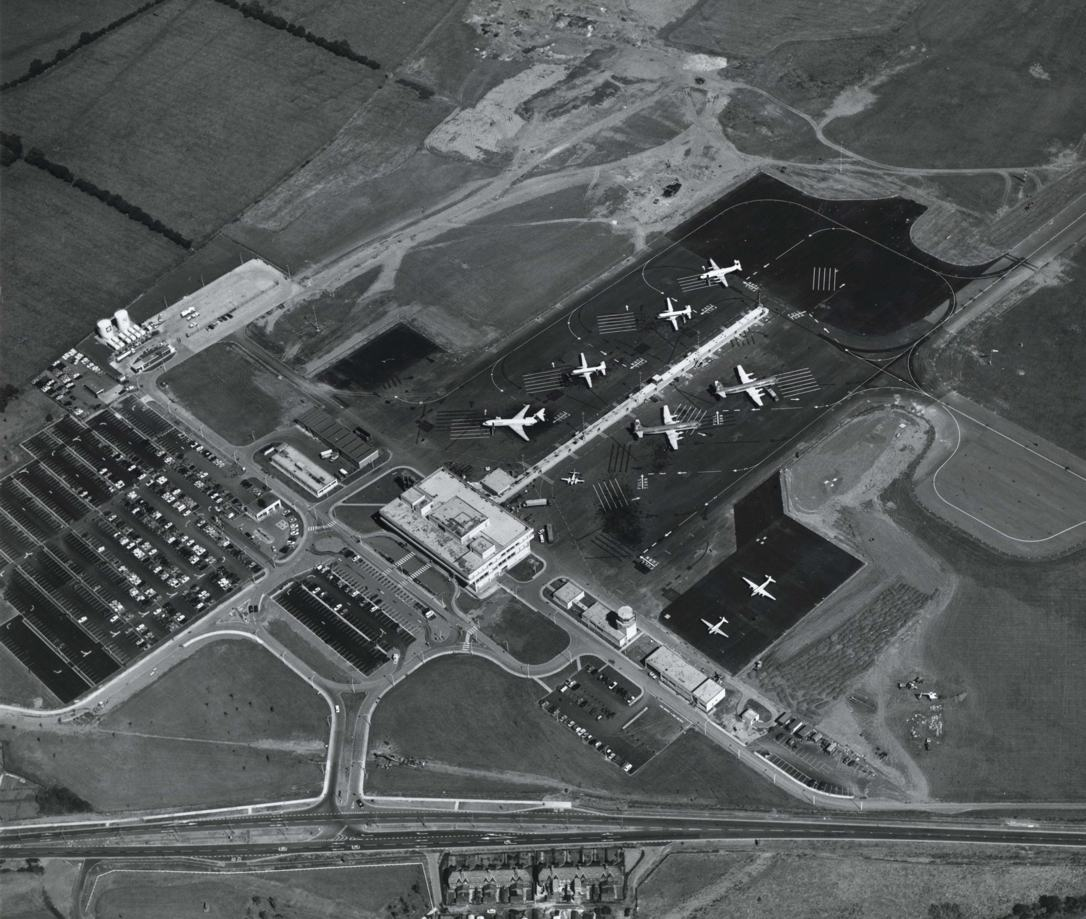
Newcastle Airport in 1972

In 1929, Newcastle-upon-Tyne City Council set up a special committee to investigate the potential for building an airport to serve the North-East of England, considering 18 locations before selecting a site at Woolsington, about 5 mi (8.0 km) northwest of the city centre. The airport was opened on 26 July 1935 as Woolsington Aerodrome by the Secretary of State for Air, Sir Phillip Cunliffe-Lister. Incorporating a clubhouse, hangar, workshops, fuel garage and grass runway, it cost £35,000 to build. The airport became the base for the Newcastle upon Tyne Flying Club, which moved from its previous home at Cramlington Aerodrome and ran the new airport on behalf of the council. On 1 June 1939, No. 43 Elementary and Reserve Flying Training School, operated by Newcastle Flying Club and equipped with a mixture of de Havilland Tiger Moths, Miles Magisters and Hawker Hinds opened at Woolsington, as one of a large number of civil-operated flying schools set up to train aircrew for the RAF. The school was disbanded on 3 September 1939, with the outbreak of the Second World War.

In 1940, the airfield was occasionally used to operate detachments of Supermarine Spitfire fighters from RAF Acklington-based 72 Squadron. On 25 July that year, No. 83 Maintenance Unit RAF, tasked with recovering crashed aircraft and salvaging any usable parts, was formed at Woolsington, remaining operational until April 1946. The airfield was also used as a base for the single Tiger Moth of the Durham University Air Squadron from February 1941, and from 1942 to 1943 by detachments from No. 278 Squadron RAF, operating Westland Lysander and Supermarine Walrus in the air sea rescue role. No. 281 Squadron RAF, another air sea rescue squadron, operated from Woolsington from June to October 1943, while from November 1943 to June 1945, the airfield was used as a satellite field for No. 62 OTU, based at RAF Ouston. Woolsington was handed back to the council in 1946.

In 1967, the construction of a runway extension and new terminal was completed, along with an apron and a new air traffic control tower. These new additions were officially opened by the Prime Minister, Harold Wilson on 17 February 1967.

In 1978, with passenger figures approaching one million per year, the airport was designated as a regional international hub airport in the UK government's White Paper on Airports Policy, opening the way for further redevelopment; in the same decade it was re-branded as Newcastle Airport. The 1980s saw further investment in check-in, catering and duty-free shops. In 1991, Airport Metro station opened, connecting the airport with Newcastle City Centre using the Tyne and Wear Metro system.

=== Since the 2000s ===
In August 2004, an extended and refurbished Departure Terminal was opened. The refurbishment included a 3,000 m^{2} (32,000 sq ft) extension with new shops, cafes and 1,200 new seats for waiting passengers.

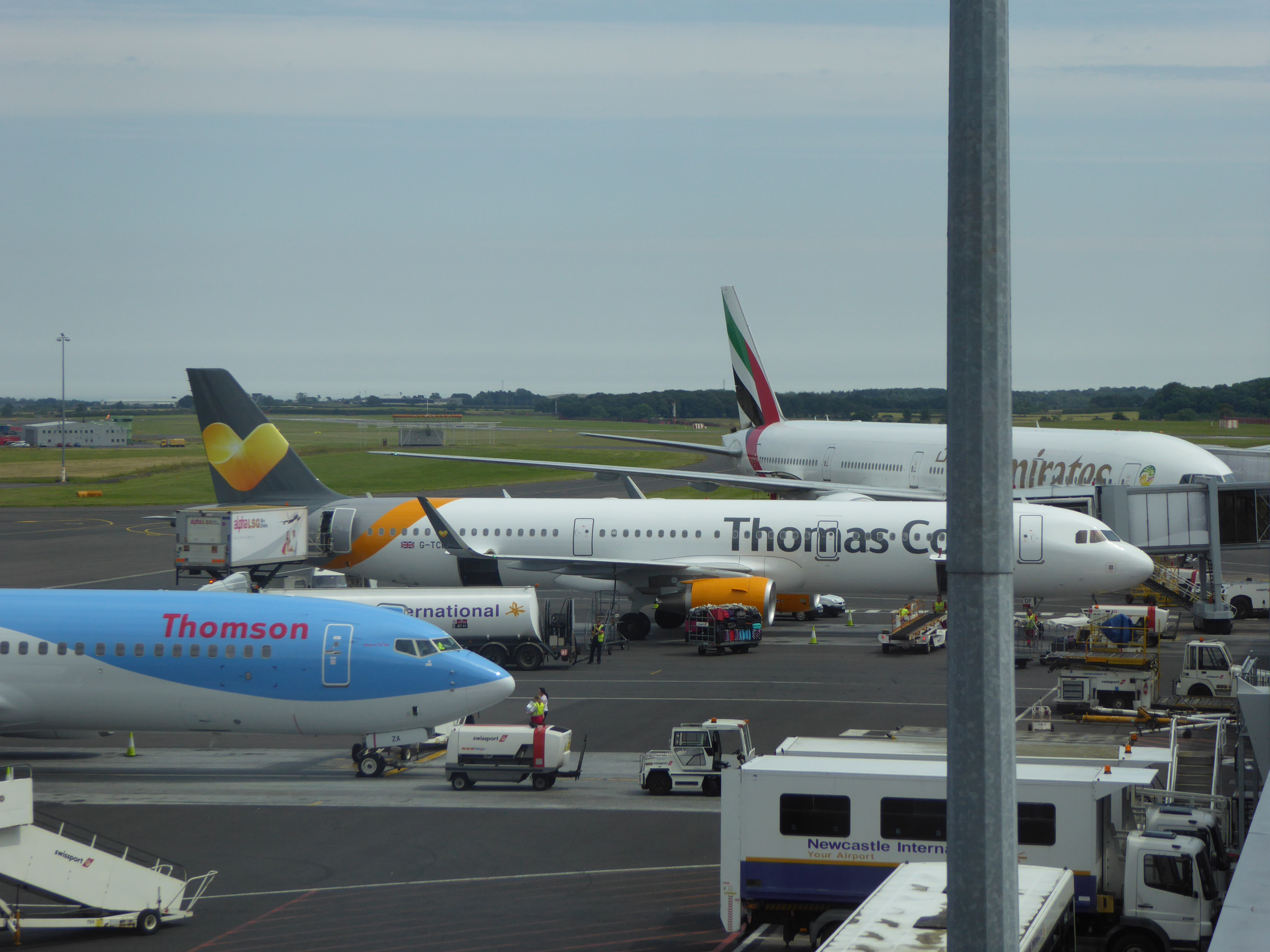
Aircraft belonging to Thomson, Thomas Cook and Emirates at the airport in 2014

In 2006, a record 5.4 million passengers used the airport, according to Civil Aviation Authority figures.

Rapid expansion in passenger traffic has led to increasing commercial use of the south side of the airport. This was previously used for general aviation, but is now used for freight, mail and corporate flights. This is partially due to difficulties obtaining departure and arrival slots for light aircraft traffic, which need to be separated from larger aircraft to protect against wake turbulence. As part of the Airport Master Plan, the south-side area is to be expanded with maintenance facilities including new hangar and apron areas.

In January 2007, it was announced that Emirates were to begin a daily non-stop service to Dubai from the airport. This service started on 7 September 2007 and has operated ever since. Until 2012, the route was flown by an Airbus A330. Since September 2012 it has been flown by a Boeing 777. Also in 2007, now defunct carrier Flyglobespan shortly connected Newcastle with Hamilton, Ontario, through this serving the greater Toronto area. Services were discontinued the same summer.

In 2012, Air Transat cut its route linking Newcastle with Toronto-Pearson, which had operated for several years. Through this, Newcastle was left without any transatlantic service.

In May 2015, United Airlines commenced its summer seasonal route from Newcastle to New York-Newark. The service operated five times per week onboard B757-2 through September. However, in August 2016, United Airlines announced it would discontinue its seasonal route from Newark to Newcastle in 2017 after operating for just two consecutive seasons, citing economic reasons.

In July 2017, it was announced that the airport would be investing £3 million on a terminal expansion project which is part of overall £20 million improvement plans running from 2016 to 2017. This £20m improvement plan included a new radar system alongside digital signage in the check-in areas and the installation of new flooring. The £3m plan includes an extension to the terminal by 4,800 sq ft (450 m^{2}) and will increase the equipment in the security hall, bringing in improved technology to speed up procedures there. This was due to be constructed over the winter of 2017/2018.

In 2019, it was named the best airport in Europe of those serving 5–15 million passengers annually by Airports Council International (ACI) for the second consecutive year.

Until 2019, Jet2.com frequently linked its base in Newcastle with Newark during Christmas time. However, these services have not been resumed since the onset of the COVID-19 pandemic in 2020.

In August 2020, easyJet announced the closure of their crew base in Newcastle due to the financial difficulties from the COVID-19 pandemic, which means that the airline only operates domestic flights from the airport after scrapping all of its international routes by 31 August 2020. However, since this decision the airline resumed its operations to Palma de Mallorca and Geneva in 2022 as well as Alicante, Amsterdam and Paris Charles de Gaulle in 2024. and Málaga and a winter seasonal route to Lyon in 2025.

In April 2023, TUI announced its programme at the airport for summer 2024, operating up to 84 weekly flights to a total of 31 destinations on offer using an additional fifth aircraft, including new routes to Sal, Cape Verde and Sharm El Sheikh, Egypt.

In May 2025, EasyJet announced that they would be reopening their base at the airport, after closing the base during the pandemic. The airline announced that they would be basing three aircraft from the start of summer 2026 with 11 new destinations, bringing their total number of routes up to 19.

== Facilities ==
Newcastle Airport Freight Village is south of the airport and includes Emirates SkyCargo and North East Air Cargo company offices which deal with freight exports and imports and mail. It also houses freight forwarding agents such as Casper Logistics Ltd, Kintetsu World Express, Kuehne + Nagel, Nippon Express, Schenker International, Davis Turner Air Cargo, and Universal Forwarding.

In April 2016, Emirates reported that flown exports have soared to £310 million per year since the arrival of the Emirates service from Newcastle to Dubai. The Dubai route contributes some £600m to the economy and has opened new export avenues to North East firms, some of whom have opened offices in the United Arab Emirates.

The airport is also home to the Newcastle Airport Fire Academy. The Newcastle Aviation Academy is also located within this area. When Gill Airways operated, its head office was in the New Aviation House, on the airport property. The south side of the airport also has a base for the National Police Air Service. They normally have one respective helicopter based here at a time but are known to rotate their fleet around bases. The area also holds maintenance workshops for the airport and various other depots for airport-run services like Alpha Catering.

== Airlines and destinations ==
=== Passenger ===
The following airlines operate regular scheduled services to and from the airport:

Airlines	Destinations
Aer Lingus	Dublin
Air France	Paris-Charles de Gaulle
British Airways	London–Heathrow
Corendon Airlines	Antalya
easyJet	Amsterdam, Belfast–International, Bristol, Fuerteventura, Kraków, Prague, Rome–Fiumicino, Sharm El Sheikh, Tenerife–South; Seasonal: Alicante, Antalya, Copenhagen, Corfu, Dalaman, Enfidha, Faro, Reykjavík–Keflavík, Lisbon, Malaga, Malta, Marrakesh, Nice, Rhodes, Reus,
Emirates	Dubai–International
Eurowings	Düsseldorf, Berlin,
Jet2.com	Agadir Antalya, Fuerteventura Funchal, Gran Canaria, Lanzarote, Malaga, Marrakesh, Paphos, Tenerife–South; Seasonal: Agadir, Antalya, Berlin, Bodrum, Bourgas, Budapest, Chania, Cologne/Bonn, Copenhagen, Corfu Dalaman, Dubrovnik, Gdańsk, Geneva, Girona, Grenoble, Heraklion, Ibiza, Izmir, Jersey, Kefalonia, Kos, Kraków, Larnaca, Majorca, Malta, Menorca, Palermo, Porto, Prague, Preveza/Lefkada, Reus, Reykjavik–Keflavik, Rhodes, Rome–Fiumicino, Skiathos, Thessaloniki, Verona, Vienna, Zakynthos; Seasonal charter: Bergen
KLM	Amsterdam
Norwegian Air Shuttle	Seasonal: Copenhagen
Ryanair	Alicante, Barcelona, Bergamo, Budapest, Charleroi, Dublin, Faro, Fuerteventura, Gdańsk, Gran Canaria, Kraków, Lanzarote, Málaga, Malta, Paphos, Tenerife–South, Wrocław; Seasonal: Chania, Ibiza, Marrakesh, Palma de Mallorca, Zadar
SunExpress	Seasonal: Antalya, Dalaman
TUI Airways	Alicante, Gran Canaria, Hurghada, Lanzarote, Sal, Sharm El Sheikh, Tenerife–South; Seasonal: Agadir, Antalya, Barbados, Burgas, Cancún, Corfu, Dalaman, Dubrovnik, Enfidha, Geneva, Heraklion Ibiza, Innsbruck, Kefalonia, Kittilä, Kos, Larnaca, Málaga, Melbourne/Orlando, Menorca, Naples, Palma de Mallorca, Paphos, Reus, Rhodes, Rovaniemi, Salzburg, Skiathos, Sofia, Turin, Verona, Zakynthos

As of June 2026, the Lufthansa Group announced that it would terminate its Newcastle to Frankfurt services, while continuing Eurowings services to Berlin and Düsseldorf. This was part of a wider adjustment to Lufthansa's 2026 summer schedule. Lufthansa said that background to this decision was the discontinuation of Lufthansa Cityline and the need to reduce economically unviable routes, due to high fuel prices. As of October 2026, Loganair pulled two routes from Newcastle, serving Southampton and Exeter airports, with just Jersey remaining.

== Statistics ==
The airport saw significant growth in the ten years to 2007, when passenger numbers peaked at 5.65 million, more than double the number handled ten years earlier. Passenger numbers declined in the subsequent four years due to the 2008 financial crisis, but later recovered, with around 5.3 million passengers passing through the airport in 2018 (close to the 2006 total), although cargo volumes have broadly increased to record levels since 2005.

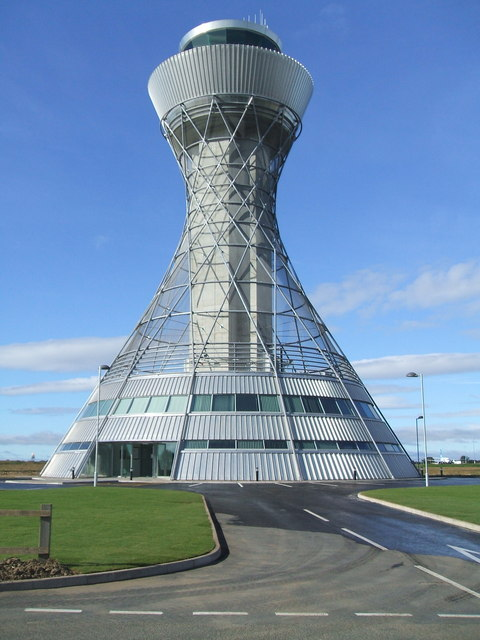
Newcastle Airport control tower

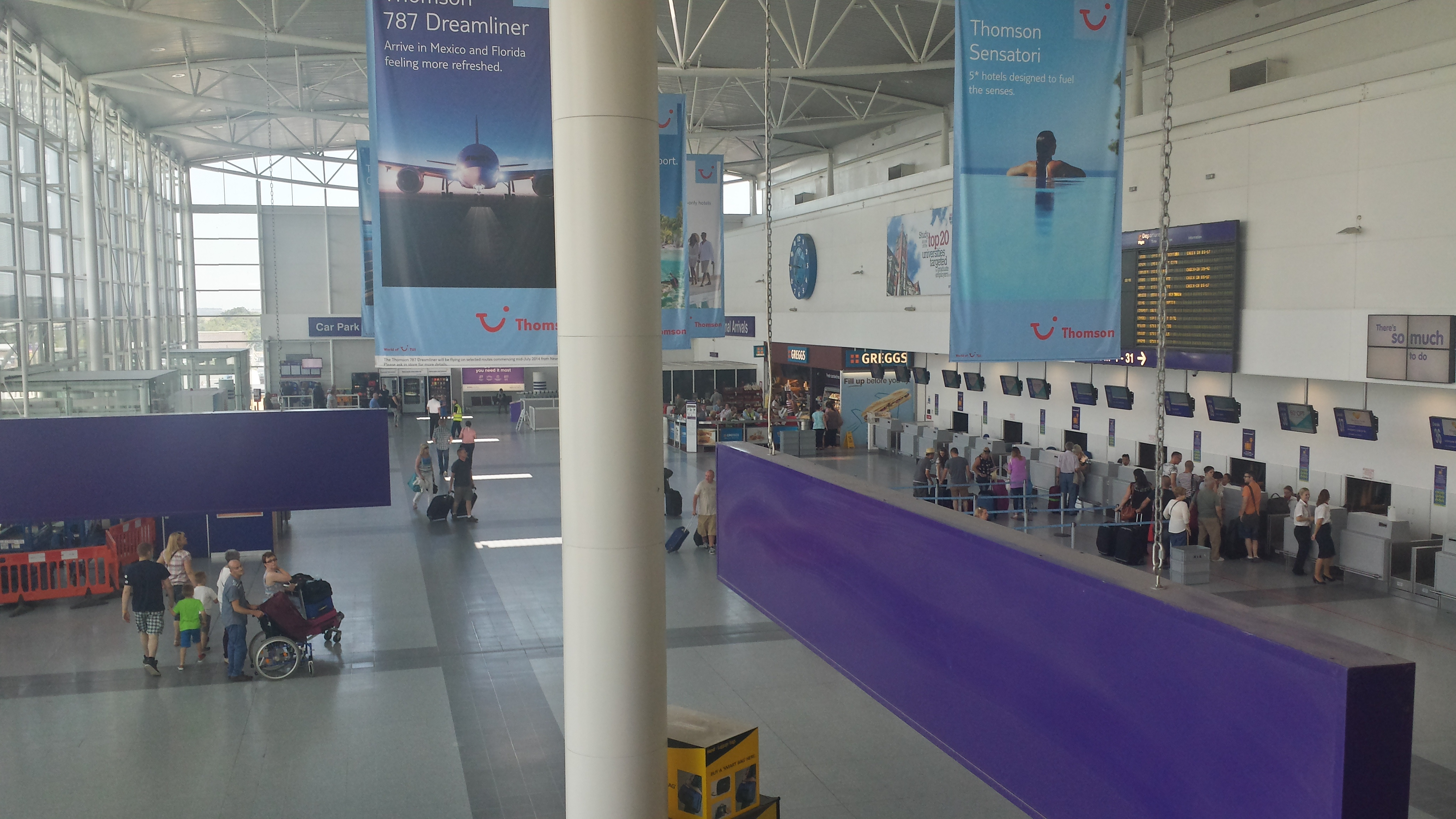
Main hall

Traffic statistics Newcastle Airport (2025)
Year	Passengers (Note: Passenger, freight and mail volumes include both domestic and international, transit, arriving and departing counterparts.)	Aircraft movements (Note: Number of movements represents total aircraft takeoffs and landings during the year.)	Freight (tonnes)	Mail (tonnes)
1997	2,642,591	81,279	1,219	3,489
1998	2,984,724	81,299	678	3,631
1999	2,994,051	79,291	776	3,409
2000	3,208,734	82,940	526	3,720
2001	3,431,393	82,524	783	2,859
2002	3,426,952	79,173	1,438	2,368
2003	3,920,204	75,113	924	2,576
2004	4,724,263	77,721	799	7,756
2005	5,200,806	77,882	199	7,820
2006	5,431,976	81,655	306	7,884
2007	5,650,716	79,200	785	8,483
2008	5,039,993	72,904	1,938	10,901
2009	4,587,883	69,254	2,597	9,758
2010	4,356,130	66,677	3,650	9,062
2011	4,346,270	64,521	3,059	8,532
2012	4,366,196	61,006	2,956	7,929
2013	4,420,839	59,962	3,701	6,512
2014	4,516,739	59,114	4,450	4,738
2015	4,562,853	55,950	3,717	4,633
2016	4,807,906	56,263	4,574	4,894
2017	5,300,274	57,808	5,482	1,128
2018	5,332,238	53,740	5,524	3
2019	5,199,000	50,688	4,745	3
2020	1,064,274	12,305	1,039	0
2021	1,024,930	12,751	1,519	0
2022	4,128,407	31,606	2,449	0
2023	4,819,969	35,447	3,549	0
2024	5,143,412	46,836	6,080	0
2025	5,480,401	48,552	3,927	0

=== Busiest routes ===
Busiest routes to and from Newcastle (2025)
Rank	Airport	Total passengers	Change 2024/25
1	London Heathrow	476,905	▼4.0%
2	Amsterdam	434,781	▲16.5%
3	Alicante	315,623	▲5.0%
4	Tenerife South	289,471	▲3.9%
5	Palma de Mallorca	273,750	▲3.5%
6	Dubai International	251,788	▲1.5%
7	Belfast International	239,579	▲3.0%
8	Dublin	226,074	▲10.3%
9	Málaga	218,920	▲26.5%
10	Paris Charles de Gaulle	201,507	▲48.4%
