= George Mathers (architect) =

English architect

- Born: 1919; Kings Cross, London, England
- Died: 11 October 2015 (aged 95–96); Cheltenham, Gloucestershire, England
- Education: Polytechnic of North London
- Occupation: Architect
- Practice: Associated architectural firm[s]
- Buildings: Marychurch, Old Hatfield - Grade II listed; Church of St Bartholomew, St Albans

George Mathers (1919 – 11 October 2015) was an architect, most notable for the Grade II listed Marychurch in Old Hatfield, Hertfordshire, England. He was also a conscientious objector jailed twice for his pacifist stance during the Second World War.

== Personal life ==
George A.J. Mathers was born in 1919 in London. His father was a postal worker. In 1933 he went to the Northern Polytechnic to study bricklaying, joinery and plumbing. In 1936 after he had completed this course he started a five-year course with the polytechnic's Department of Architecture. During his time at the Northern Polytechnic he became a Roman Catholic and Pacifist. As a conscientious objector he was expelled from the polytechnic and imprisoned in Wormwood Scrubs where he met Paul Mauger, a Quaker architect, who was a prison visitor and had been a conscientious objector in the First World War. Mauger offered him a job. However, Mathers was later jailed for a second time for Pacifism before joining Mauger on a permanent basis.

Mathers was married twice and had four children with his first wife. His second wife was called Yoko. He lived for much of his life in Ware, Hertfordshire before moving to Cheltenham. He is often referred to within architectural circles as "George Mathers of Ware". This is how he is referred to in the listing of Marychurch by Historic England, for example.

== Buildings and career ==
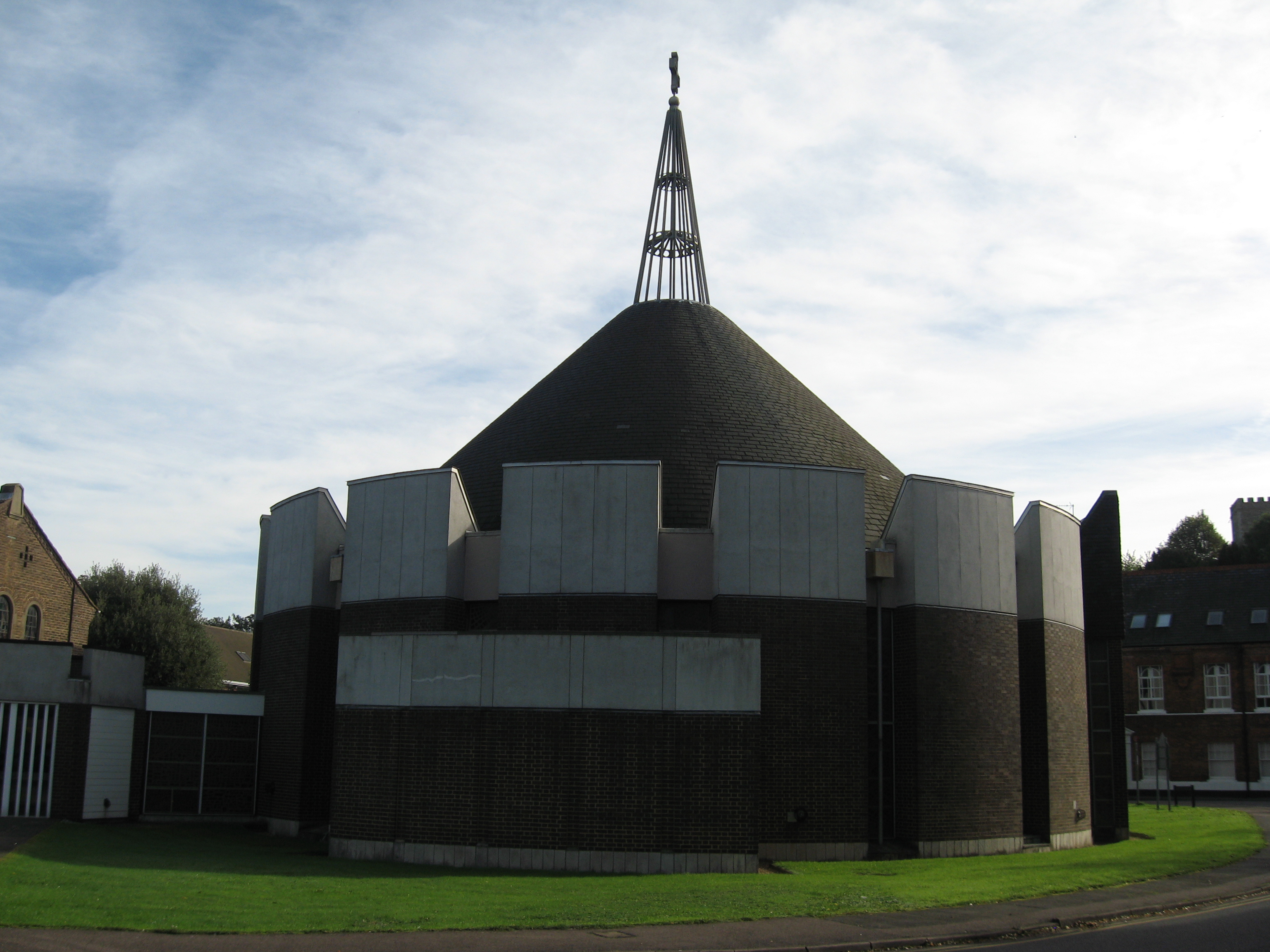
Grade II Listed Marychurch, Hatfield

Mathers designed a wide range of buildings during his career but is most recognised as a designer of churches. He was secretary and later president of the Hertfordshire Association of Architects.

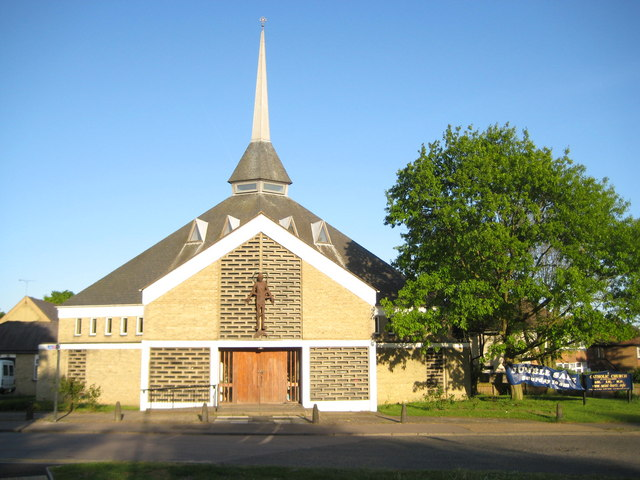
St Bartholomew's Church, St Albans

He began his career working for Paul Mauger, eventually becoming a partner. At that time he designed council housing and other public buildings. His career in church building began when he was asked to design a chapel for Catholic nuns in 1957.

In 1960 Mathers set up his own practice in mid-Hertfordshire along with Barrie Thomas. While working with Thomas he was asked to design the Church of St Bartholomew (St Albans) and Marychurch, Hatfield.

Mathers retired when he was 94 and died aged 96 in 2015.

=== Church of St Bartholomew, St Albans ===
Taking Stock describes the church as being based on a pentagram: "The building is externally clad in loadbearing brick laid in English garden wall bond (five courses of stretchers to each course of headers), surmounted by a reinforced concrete ring beam and a steel framed main roof covered with Cornish slates. The form of the roof calls to mind medieval precedent, e.g. the Abbot’s kitchen at Glastonbury. It is surmounted by an aluminium spirelet and cross and lit by dormer windows, considered by The Buildings of England to be ‘unfortunately spiky’."

The altar was contributed by the sculptor Angela Godfrey, who was commissioned by Mathers shortly after graduating from King's College, Newcastle upon Tyne.

Historic England in its listing of St Gregory the Great, South Ruislip (Grade II listed) notes that Gerard Goalen may have been influenced by Mathers' Church of St Bartholomew. "George Mathers’ Church of St Bartholomew, St Albans (1963) was the first church in the Diocese to be built in the round, shortly before the Second Vatican Council reforms".

=== Marychurch, Old Hatfield ===
"His beautiful round Marychurch in Old Hatfield, of 1971, with its glorious coloured glass windows, was grade II listed in 2013 – a rare achievement for a living architect. He worked with many artists, including the sculptor Angela Godfrey."

— David Sutcliffe, Obituary George Mathers 1919-2015, "RIBA"

Mathers most notable building is the Grade II listed Marychurch in Hatfield. Historic England in its listing says of the building: "the exterior uses both traditional and modern materials, referencing the early-C20 church to the north, but making use of contrasting texture and colour to good effect. The exterior encloses and conceals an interior with a sense of space and colour created mainly by the open plan form and the dalle de verre glass panels, which form an integral part of the church's design". Mathers collaborated with several notable Roman Catholic artists on this building including Dom Charles Norris and Dom Paulinus Angold (who contributed the dalle de verre glass) and Angela Godfrey who contributed the welded steel screen and font.

Mathers was reported as being "very surprised" when told the Marychurch had been listed. "I’m very surprised actually that someone thought it was old enough to be considered for the list. Usually only antique or historical buildings are included, and not normally during the architect's lifetime."

=== Other buildings ===
- 2006 - reordered Grade II listed The Roman Catholic Church of St Michael, Ashford
