= George Mathers =

George Mathers may refer to:

- George Mathers, 1st Baron Mathers (1886–1965), Scottish trade unionist and politician
- George Mathers (architect) (1919–2015), English architect
