= Gerard Goalen =

English architect

Gerard Thomas Goalen
- Born: 16 December 1918; Birkenhead, Cheshire, England
- Died: 2 January 1999 (aged 80); Cambridge, Cambridgeshire, England
- Occupation: Architect
- Buildings: 1953–54, Our Lady of Fatima, Harlow, 1964, The Church of the Good Shepherd Nottingham; 1965, St Gregory the Great, South Ruislip; 1968, St Thomas More, Maresfield Gardens, Swiss Cottage

Gerard Thomas Goalen (16 December 1918 – 2 January 1999) was a British architect who specialised in church architecture and was influenced by continental models and the Liturgical Movement. He was one of the most important architects of the Catholic Modernist movement in the United Kingdom during the 20th century.

== Personal life ==
Goalen was born in Birkenhead, then part of Cheshire, in December 1918. He attended Douai School before going on to study at the University of Liverpool's School of Architecture, where he produced a final year thesis project on a modern pilgrimage church. Goalen had one son, John Martin Goalen (born 1946), also an architect.

== Church architecture ==
Goalen is regarded as one of the key British architects of the Roman Catholic Liturgical Movement in the UK that resulted in a large number of new modernist RC churches being built, and other churches being reordered. A group of architects that included Gillespie, Kidd & Coia, Gerard Goalen, Francis Pollen, Desmond Williams and Austin Winkley, utilised contemporary design and construction methods to deliver the ‘noble simplicity’ instructed by Vatican I. Goalen explained how he began building churches.

"I was first asked to design a Catholic church in 1953 (the design remained on paper for five years before we received approval to build it). Nearly nine years after receiving this first commission, I was asked to design another Catholic church, and since then I have received, at fairly regular intervals, commissions for Catholic, Anglican and Nonconformist churches."

— Goalen, Gerard, "A Golden Decade", The Catholic Review

While working as Senior Architect for Harlow New Town Development Corporation, he was recommended for the task of building a new Catholic Church to the parish priest Francis Burgess by the architect-planner Frederick Gibberd. Both the Catholic Church and the town's planners wanted to create a landmark building, and Gibberd believed that Goalen's previous experience in the town would help him create a building that fitted with the overall aims of the redevelopment . This led to his first church commission – Our Lady of Fatima, Harlow, which led to Goalen being able to set up in private practice and build and reorder more churches.

Goalen is seen as an influential Modernist and four of his churches are now listed:

- Our Lady of Fatima, Harlow (Grade II listed, 1958)
- Church of Good Shepherd, Nottingham (Grade II* listed, 1962)
- The Church of St Gregory the Great, South Ruislip (Grade II listed, 1965)
- St Thomas More, Maresfield Gardens (Grade II listed, 1968)

=== Our Lady of Fatima ===
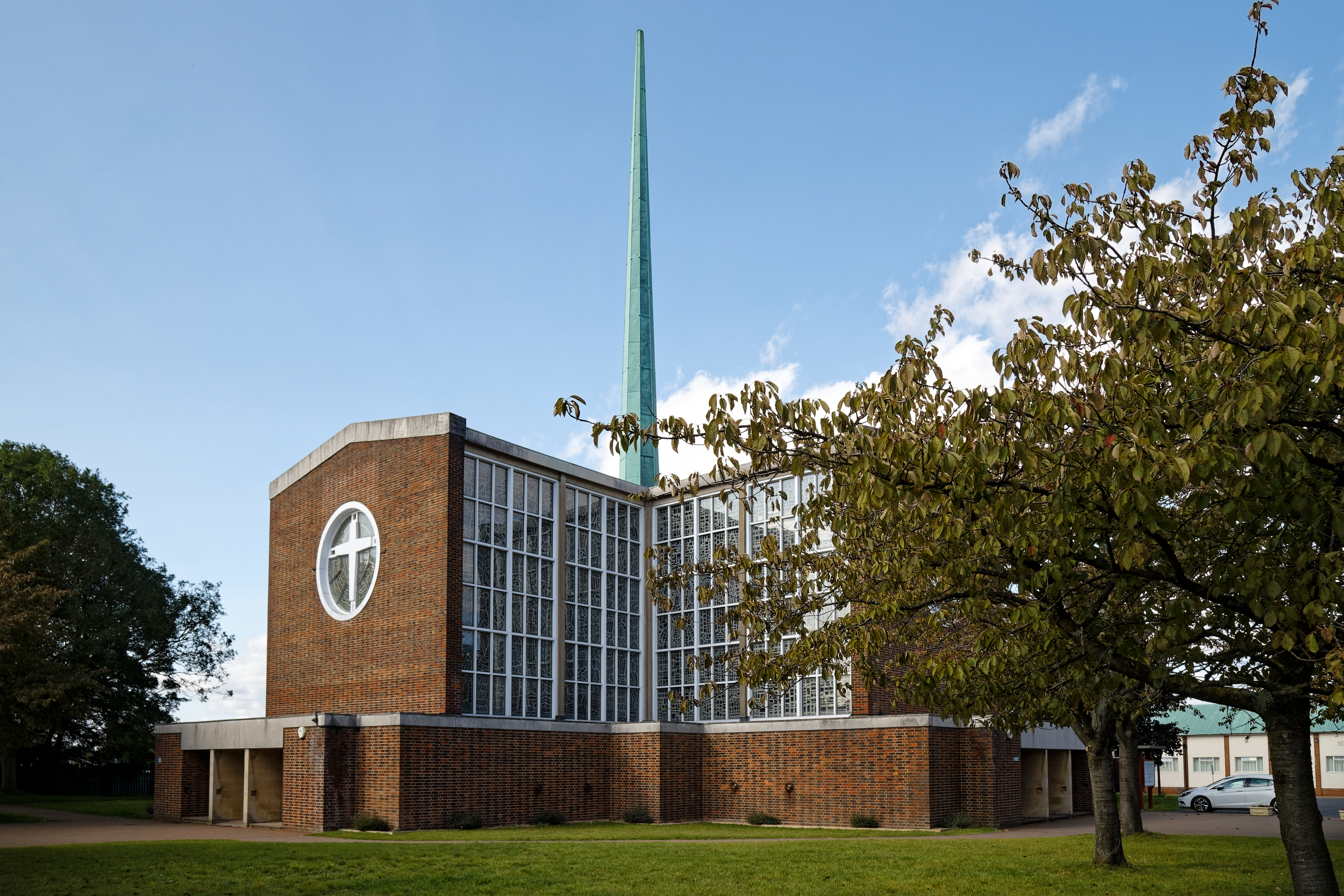
Our Lady of Fatima, Catholic Church, 1960

Our Lady of Fatima, Harlow, is a Grade II* listed Roman Catholic Church designed by Gerard Goalen in 1953-4. The brief was for a church that could hold 500 parishioners, set as close as possible to a free-standing altar. The sanctuary was to be generously sized. Goalen was recommended for the job by his boss at Harlow New Town Development, Frederick Gibberd. Building started in 1958 and was completed in 1960. The church is built in reinforced concrete and Surrey stock bricks. The roof is clad in copper, with concrete and asphalt for the aisles. The 84-foot central spire is made of plywood sheathed in copper.

"For the church the architect, Mr. Gerard Goalen, has drawn up plans for a building with three naves, walls of coloured glass to give a warm internal radiance and a strictly liturgical layout."

— 3 Mary Churches for Harlow, "Catholic Herald"

Goalen also designed the tabernacle and high altar candlesticks and cross. A model of the church was exhibited at the Royal Academy in 1956 and the church was extremely influential. Proctor and Gillick argued that the liturgical movement was a significant influence in this church and that was also closely related to the egalitarian social aims of post-war modern urban planning in Harlow.

The church cost £60,000 to build, and the Catholic Review noted it owed much "to the generosity of Fr. Burgess's parents". It was one of the first post-war churches to break away from the traditional longitudinal plan, being T-shaped, with the sanctuary at the central crossing. The church's reinforced concrete frame allows for large areas of dalle de verre by Dom Charles Norris, an early use of this medium. The church was extremely influential, with Andrew Derrick crediting it with influencing Frederick Gibberd's winning entry for Liverpool Metropolitan Cathedral. In 1998 a view of the church was the main image on the cover of an album by the British duo The Chemical Brothers.

The building was not without its critics. The architect Robert Maguire, writing in the Ecclesiology Today (Issue 27, January 2002) commented: "Gerard Goalen's T-shaped church of Our Lady of Fatima at Harlow, resplendent with its Buckfast Abbey glass. My only serious criticism of this – and it is serious – is that God's Holy People are divided, like All Gaul, into three parts."

It closed in 2001–2005 in order for £500,000 of repairs to be made to the glass in its walls. In December 2017 it was reported in the local press that the church had to be closed while repairs were made to the spire. It had previously had to close for work to be carried out on its concrete infrastructure. In 2023 Historic England raised its grade as a protected building to Grade II*. This was on the basis of its design with the alter surrounded by seats for the congregation and the large amount of modern stained glass that illuminates the interior.

=== Church of Good Shepherd, Nottingham ===
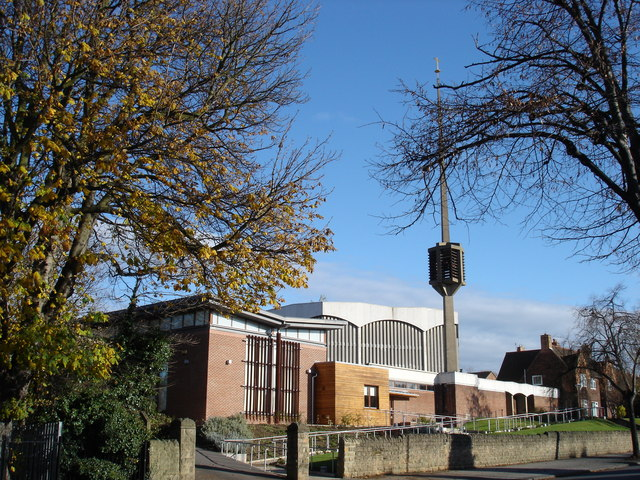
Church of The Good Shepherd, Nottingham, 1964

The Church of the Good Shepherd, Nottingham is a Roman Catholic church located on Thackerays Lane in Woodthorpe, a suburban area of Arnold, Nottingham. It is a Grade II* listed building. The church was opened on 23 July 1964 and celebrated its Golden Jubilee in 2014. Goalen designed it in a modern style and won an award from the Royal Institute of British Architects in 1966. The dalle de verre stained glass is by Patrick Reyntiens, who Goalen had previously worked with at Our Lady of Fatima, Harlow.

In 2012, the church was awarded £119,000 by English Heritage to resolve issues with concrete fatigue and reinforcement decay, which was eroding the fabric of the building.

=== St Gregory the Great, South Ruislip ===
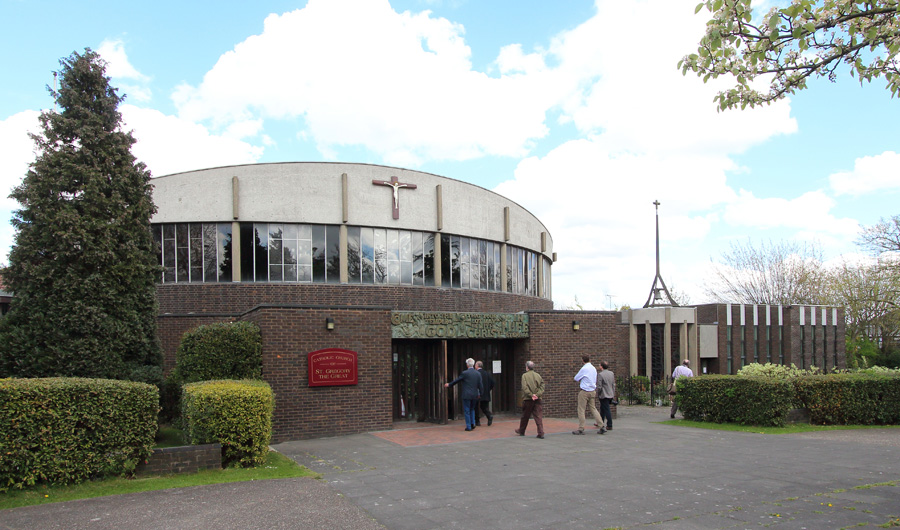
St Gregory the Great, South Ruislip

The Grade II listed Roman Catholic Church of St Gregory the Great, South Ruislip, London was designed by Goalen in 1965. A model of the scheme was exhibited at the Royal Academy in 1965. The church is little altered since it was first built and retains its principal fixtures, fittings and finishes. It features a forward sanctuary contained within an elongated oval plan. The church is built using a concrete frame construction, and is faced with brown brick. The roof is not visible. There is some high-quality stained and dalle de verre glass. The porch is spanned by a sculptural panel in bronze.

Paraphrasing Goalen's talk to parishioners on the completion of the church, Robert Proctor, Senior Lecturer in the Department of Architecture & Civil Engineering Centre for Advanced Studies in Architecture (CASA), University of Bath states: "He [Goalen] explained that two principles of modern architecture had informed his work: the design of spaces according to function and the ‘honest employment of modern methods of building".

The building contains work by Patrick Reyntiens, Steven Sykes, Dom Charles Norris and Willi Soukop. Proctor notes: "Martin Goalen told me that his father found [the parish priest] Dayer the perfect client and that he regarded this church as his best church and I would not disagree".

=== St Gabriel, Islington ===
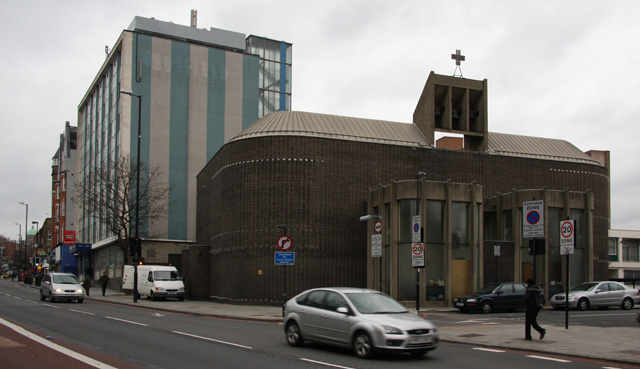
St Gabriel's, Islington, 1966

St Gabriel, Islington was designed in 1966 by Gerard Goalen to seat 500–600. It is built from dark grey brick, with a concrete and aluminium roof. The walls were designed to be windowless to shut out road traffic noise. Goalen also built the adjoining two-storey presbytery and a two-storey community centre. Around 1981, Gerard Goalen & Partner converted the baptistery into a meeting room (now the sacristy).

The church was later reordered by Carmel Cauchi, who altered the sanctuary steps, plastered the walls (which were originally exposed brick), enclosed the deep coffers of the ceiling, and provided new sanctuary furnishings. At some point the original configuration of the crying chapel, and the organ and choir which used to flank the sanctuary was altered.

=== St Mary the Immaculate, Grantham ===
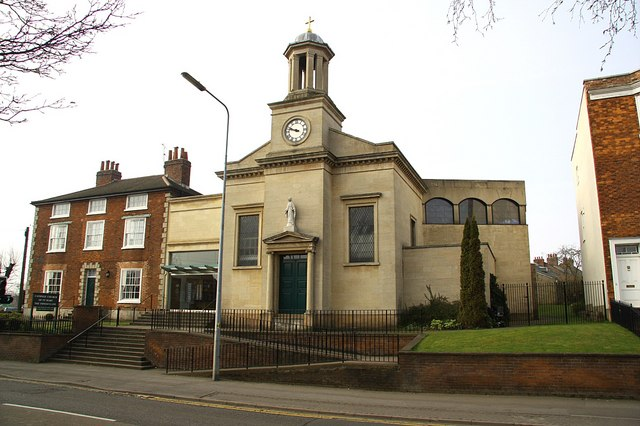
St Mary the Immaculate, Grantham

A Roman Catholic church in Grantham, Lincolnshire that was built in 1832 by E.J. Willson and substantially rebuilt by Goalen in 1964-5. Goalen removed the north wall and extended in that direction. The old sanctuary became the baptistery and the entrance was moved to its present position. A ‘crying’ corridor was introduced on the south side of the church.

=== St Ann's Nottingham, Our Lady and St Edward ===
In 1966 Goalen completed the sanctuary, which was built as part of the contract for the new friary buildings. The single storey friary buildings are of pale brick with a shallow pitched felt-covered roofs, arranged around a central cloister that contains a small rectangular pond.

=== St Joseph, Retford ===
St Joseph's Retford, Nottinghamshire was designed by E Bower Norris in modern Romanesque design, incorporating Art Deco elements. It opened in 1959 and in 1968 was re-ordered by Goalen to comply with the recommendations of Vatican II. During the re-order, Goalen commissioned a large Christus Resurrexit for the sanctuary wall by Steven Sykes, with whom he had collaborated previously.

=== St Thomas More, Maresfield Gardens ===
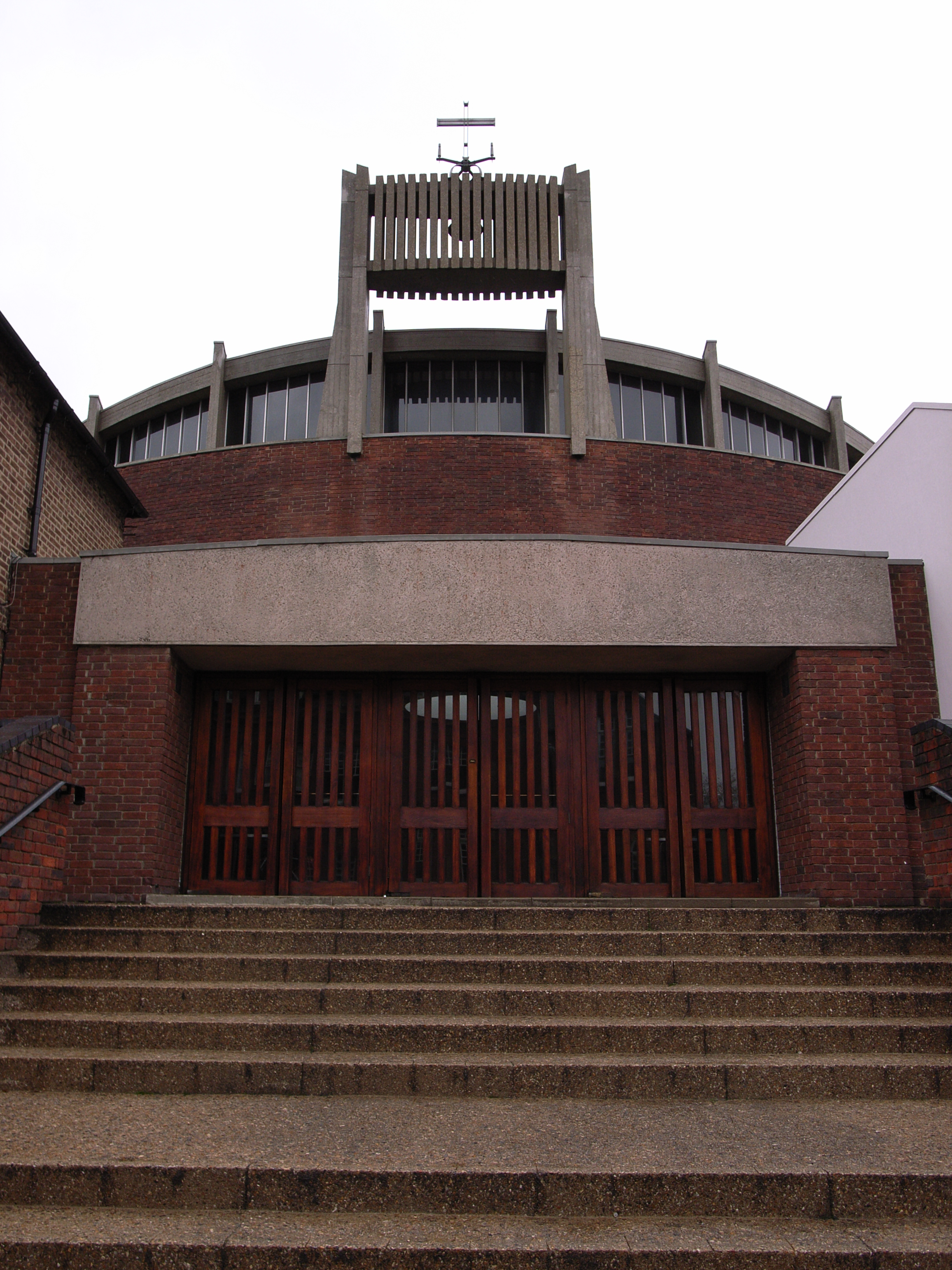
Roman Catholic Church of St Thomas More, London, 1968

The Roman Catholic Church of St Thomas More is in Maresfield Gardens, Swiss Cottage, London. The building was designed in 1968 to replace an existing 1938 building which had been the studio of society portrait painter Philip de László (1869–1937). The current building is built in dark brown brick with exposed concrete-framed clerestory and roof structure. It also uses Portland stone, Tinos marble, Travertine fixtures and fittings. The building was designed to maximise accommodation on a restricted site and to comply with the liturgical developments of the Second Vatican Council. The building has seating for 700 people, whilst ensuring that no-one is more than 40 feet from the altar. The consultant engineers were Ove Arup and Partners, and the contractors were John Murphy and Sons. (information from the Solemn Opening and Blessing booklet, 1969)

St Thomas More continues to develop ideas from Goalen's earlier buildings such as the church of Our Lady of Fatima, Harlow, Essex (1958, listed Grade II), the Church of the Good Shepherd, Woodthorpe, Nottinghamshire (1962, listed Grade II*), and the Church of St Gregory the Great, South Ruislip (1965, listed Grade II).

Goalen's design survives relatively intact, with only minor changes in layout. It contains abstract stained glass by Whitefriars Studios and a statue of St Anthony by renowned ecclesiastical sculptor David John.

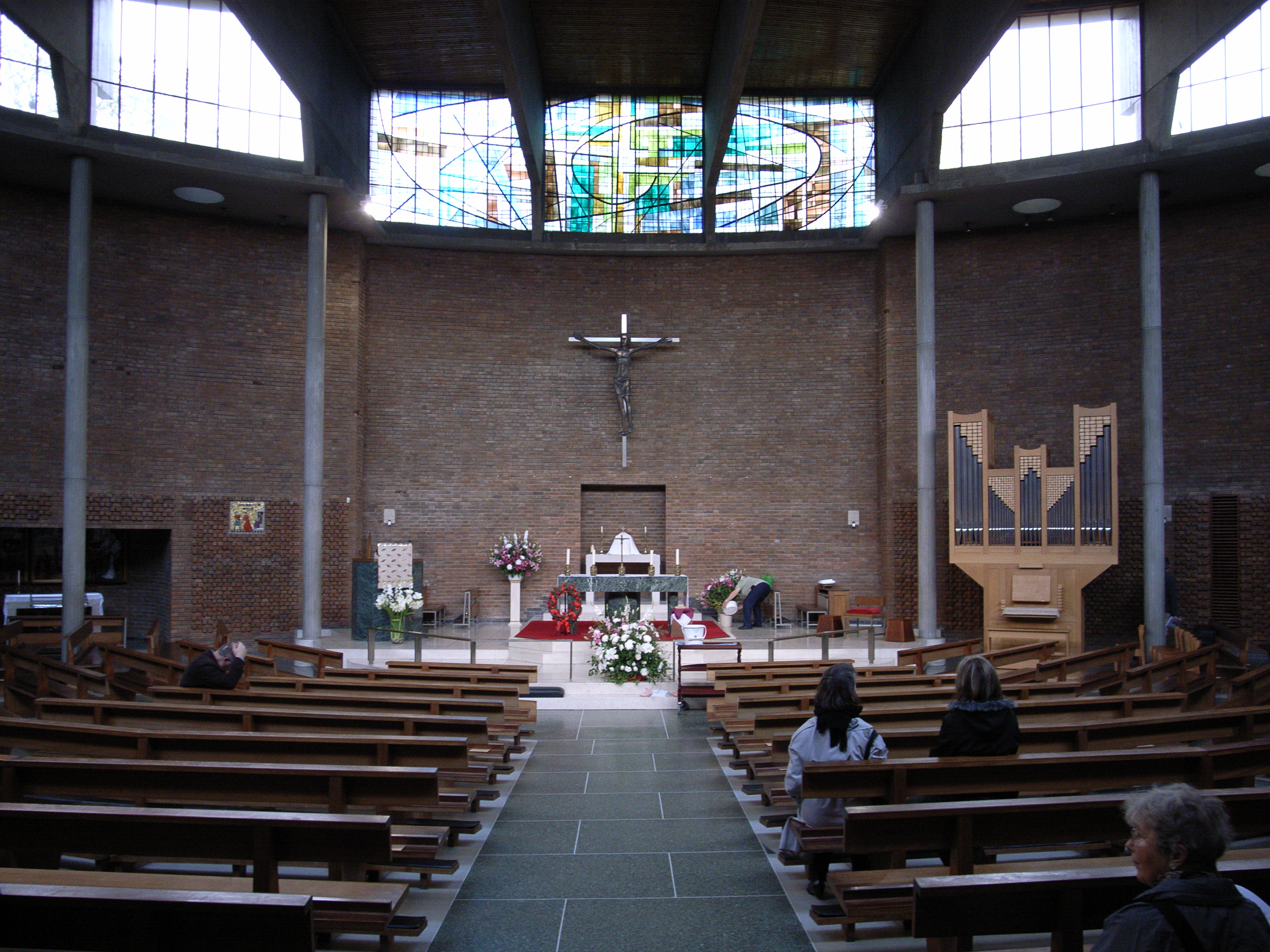
Inside view of St Thomas More

=== St James, Harlow ===
1969

=== Our Lady and St Christopher, Cranford ===
A 1970 design by Goalen that combines worship and social spaces within a single light grey brick building. The buildings lie within the Cranford Village Conservation Area.

"The new Catholic parish at Cranford, Middlesex, has a less unconventional proposal: the church and the hall are to be united on Sundays by drawing back a folding partition. This does not sound very remarkable, but the detailed brief and its interpretation are interesting. For the common defects of such an arrangement will (it is hoped) be overcome...At Cranford the building is designed as a trinity of spaces, a nave flanked by two very wide parallel "aisles" each of which has its own quite distinct and separate roof. One aisle will be partitioned off to become the hall on weekdays, but the geometry of the floor and roof has been contrived to make this aisle into a really independent room, not just a "slice".

— Gerard Goalen, Catholic Review, "The Parish and its Involvement in Church Building: Sacred or Profane"

=== Our Lady and the English Martyrs Church ===
The Church of Our Lady and the English Martyrs is an English Roman Catholic parish church located at the junction of Hills Road and Lensfield Road in south east Cambridge. It is a large Gothic Revival church built between 1885 and 1890. The church is a Grade II* listed building.

To bring the sanctuary in line with the liturgical directives resulting from the Second Vatican Council (1962–1965), its design and re-ordering was undertaken by Goalen. On 7 April 1973, Charles Grant, the Bishop of Northampton, consecrated the present central altar. The original high altar has subsequently been used mainly for reservation of the Blessed Sacrament.

=== Holy Trinity with St Augustine, Leytonstone ===
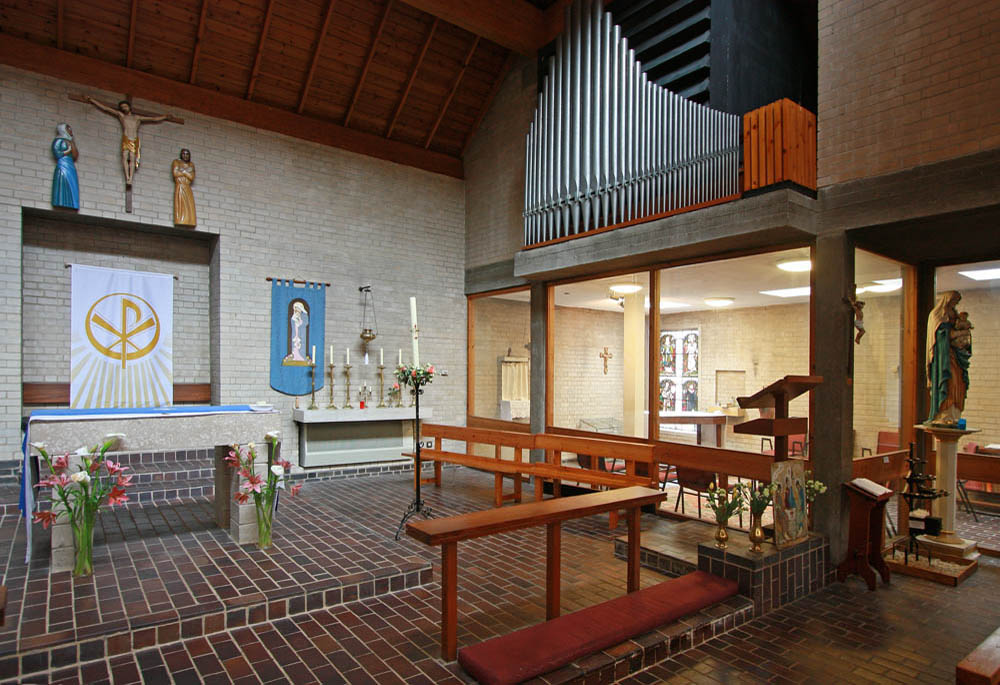
Holy Trinity & St Augustine, South Birkbeck Road, Leytonstone, interior view

A regeneration programme in the borough meant the demolition of the two Anglican churches in Leytonstone, the sale of the sites being used to fund the construction of a new church, the Holy Trinity with St Augustine (1973). The new church was designed to fit in with the regenerated Cathall Estate and is known locally as ‘the cube’.

=== St Francis of Assisi, Stratford ===
In around 1978 the sacristy of St Francis of Assisi Church, Stratford, London, was adapted under the direction of Gerald Goalen & Partner. The altar was made moveable to allow the room to be used for meetings; a bronze and resin crucifix by David John was suspended over its normal position. Other furnishings in the chapel, including stained glass clerestory windows, were designed by the architects.

== Other buildings ==
=== University Chaplaincy Centre, Cambridge ===
Goalen designed the chaplaincy as an addition to the Cambridge University Catholic Chaplaincy's headquarters, Fisher House. Designed it 1976, it originally contained a chapel and offices but was converted to exclusive use as a place of worship in 2008.

=== Parish hall, adjoining St Joseph and the English Martyrs, Bishop's Stortford ===
In 1965 Goalen designed a new parish hall for land to the rear of St Joseph and the English Martyrs, Bishop's Stortford. This was extended by the addition of a clubroom in 1972.

== Publications ==
- A Golden Decade, Gerard Goalen, 12 September 1969. The Catholic Herald .
- Making The Best Use of Our Architects, Gerard Goalen, 3 March 1967. The Catholic Herald .
- The Parish and its involvement in Church Building: Sacred or Profane, Gerard Goalen, 27 September 1968. The Catholic Herald.
- Building the Modern Church: Roman Catholic Church Architecture in Britain, 1955 to 1975, Robert Proctor, Ashgate/Routledge, 2014
- Goalen, G, A Place for the Celebration of Mass
- 'Liturgical Arts' in Liturgical Arts, (1961)
- Goalen, G, 'Church Buildings Today' in The House Of God, (Oct 1960)
- Harwood, E, 'Twentieth Century Society Journal' in Liturgy and Architecture, Vol. 3, (no.3 1998), 68–71
