= Our Lady of Fatima Church, Harlow =

Our Lady of Fatima Church
- Roman Catholic Church of Our Lady of Fatima
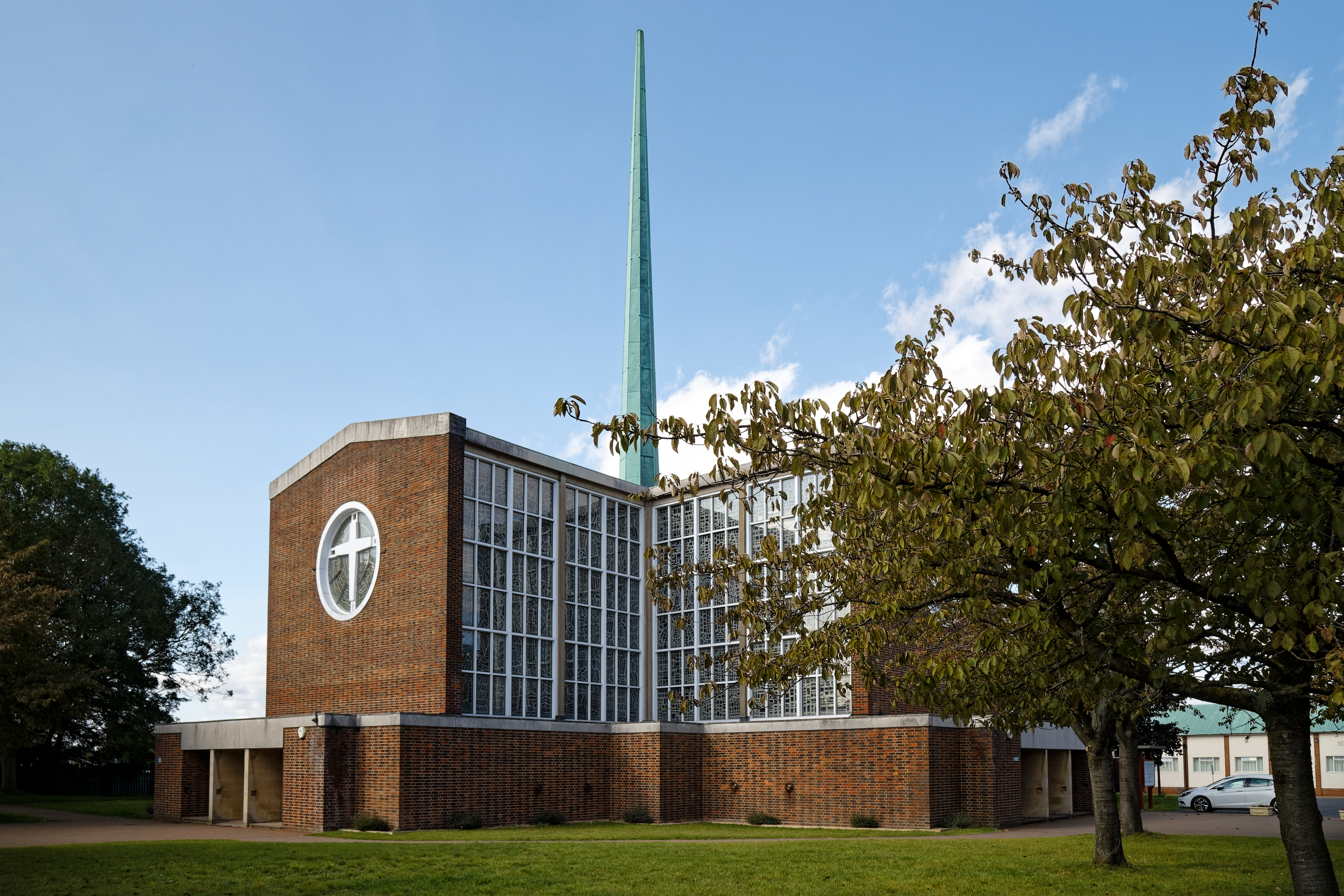

- Location within Essex
- 51.7769°N 0.1111°E
- OS grid reference: TL 45737 10803
- Location: Harlow, Essex
- Country: England
- Denomination: Roman Catholic

History
- Status: Parish church

Architecture
- Functional status: Active
- Heritage designation: Grade II* listed
- Designated: 20 December 2000
- Architect: Gerard Goalen
- Style: Modernist
- Groundbreaking: 1958
- Completed: 1960
- Construction cost: £48,500

Specifications
- Capacity: 500

Administration
- Province: Westminster
- Diocese: Brentwood

Our Lady of Fatima's Church is a Roman Catholic parish church in Harlow, Essex, England. It was designed between 1953 and 1954 by Gerard Goalen and was one of the earliest churches in England where the design was influenced by the Liturgical Movement. Construction did not begin until 1958 and the church was consecrated in 1960. Notable for its highly decorated interior, the church contains examples of dalle de verre glasswork, which are considered the first major instance of the style in Britain. This work was undertaken by Dom Charles Norris of Buckfast Abbey. Goalen designed the church in a Modernist style, influenced by European examples. It is a Grade II* listed building.

== History ==
In the immediate post-war period, a number of new towns were developed to assist with reconstruction, in particular rehousing. Harlow was so designated in 1947. Development was led by Frederick Gibberd who initially engaged Gerard Goalen to work on the development of industrial estates on the outskirts of the town. In 1954 Gibberd asked Goalen to design a Catholic church but delays in approval both from the Catholic Church and the local council meant that construction did not begin until 1958. The church was completed by 1960.

An image of the church was used on the cover for the 1998 album, Brothers Gonna Work It Out by The Chemical Brothers. The church was closed for repairs in the early 21st century, the parish raising substantial sums for the restoration of the interior. As of 2023, some £300,000 in funding was required to restore the roof and replace the spire which was earlier removed on safety grounds. The church remains an active parish church in the deanery of West Essex within the Diocese of Brentwood.

== Architecture ==
Goalen's designs for the Church of Our Lady drew on Continental examples; the Église Notre-Dame du Raincy in France and Karl Moser's Kirche St Anton in Basel, Switzerland being the most direct influences. (Note: Goalen's design for Our Lady of Fatima is reputed to have influenced Gibberd in his designs for Liverpool Metropolitan Cathedral.) His other main influence was the thinking of the Liturgical Movement, which sought to break down barriers between worshippers and priests; to this end Goalen set out the church on a T-plan, and placed the altar in the centre of the congregation. The church was built using reinforced concrete and Surrey stock bricks.

The interior of the church is notable particularly for its dalle de verre glasswork. The technique, developed in France, uses thickened glass to create depth of colour and was pioneered in Britain by Dom Charles Norris of Buckfast Abbey. His work at Our Lady of Fatima was the first of some 250 commissions for similar schemes in churches across Britain. The glasswork covers some 60 per cent of the church's interior walling, creating what The Twentieth Century Society described as a "kaleidoscopic [effect of] glorious colour and light". The society's senior casework officer, Clare Price, wrote that Our Lady's was a "pioneer of a unified scheme of dalle de verre glass and modern design". The statue of Christ to the right of the altar was designed by Daphne Hardy Henrion.

The church was designated a Grade II listed building in 2000, its grading being raised to Grade II* in 2023. Historic England's listing record describes the church as "a striking piece of modernist architecture".

== Gallery ==
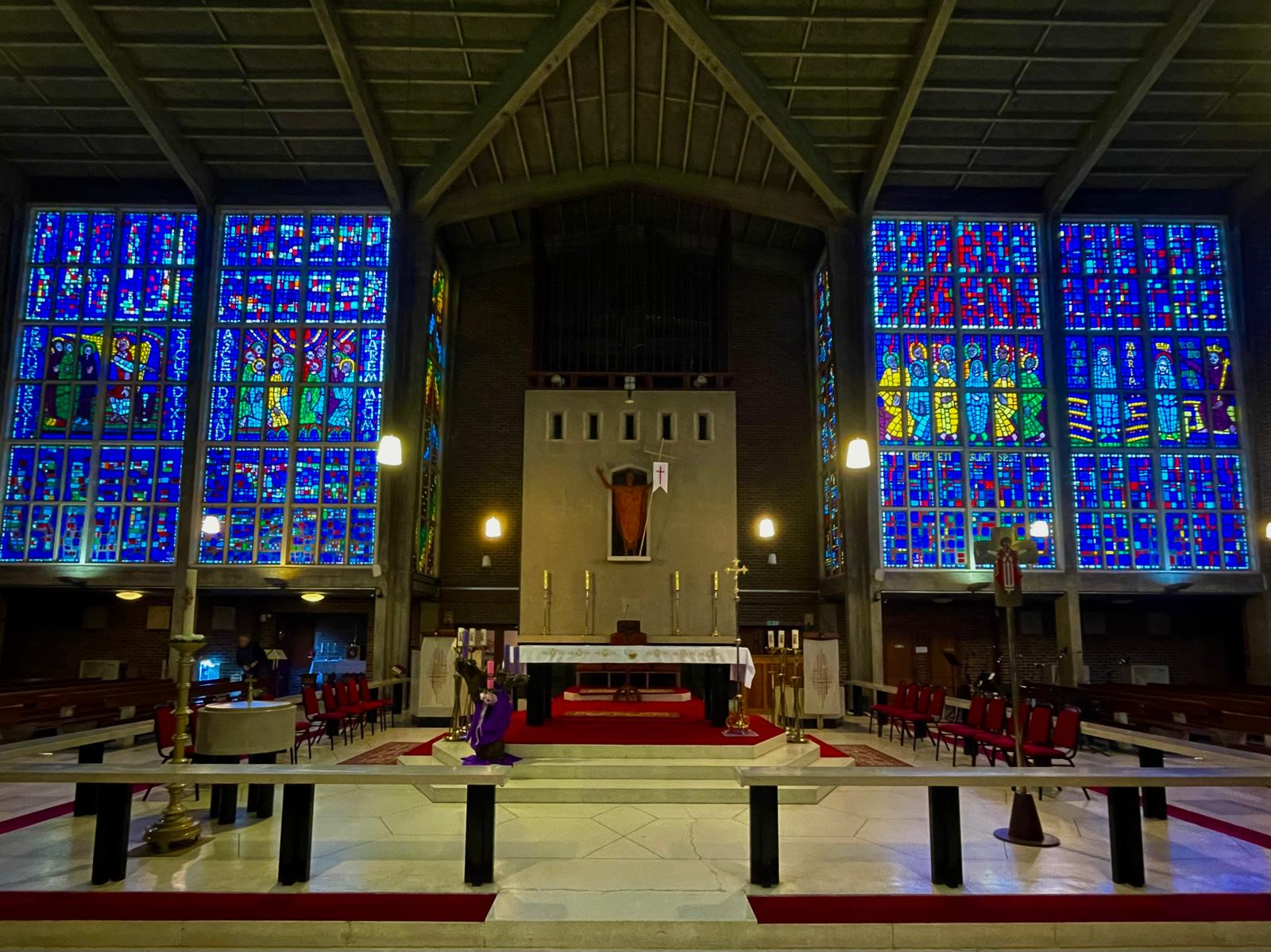
Interior view towards chancel.

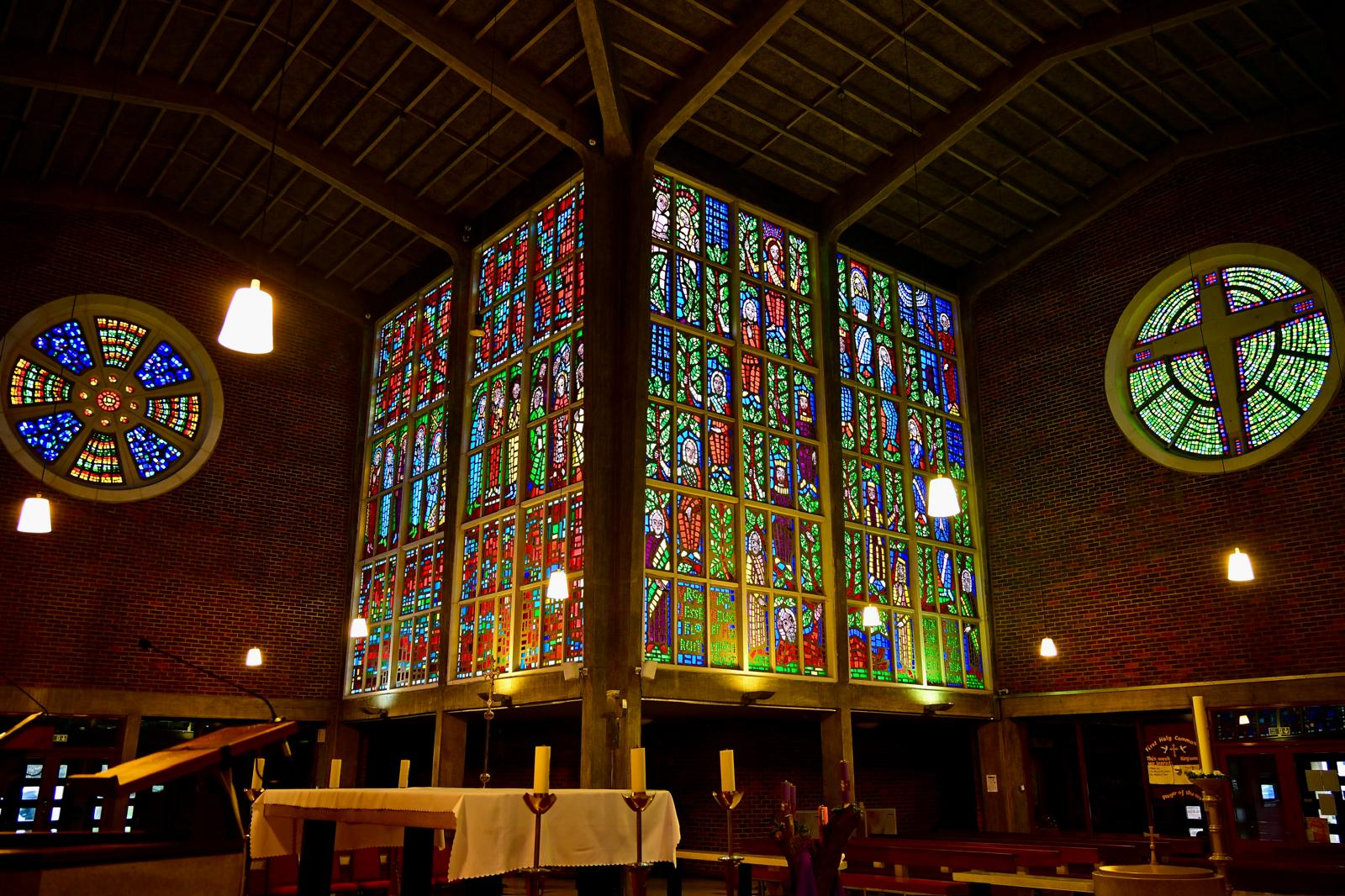
Interior south-west view.

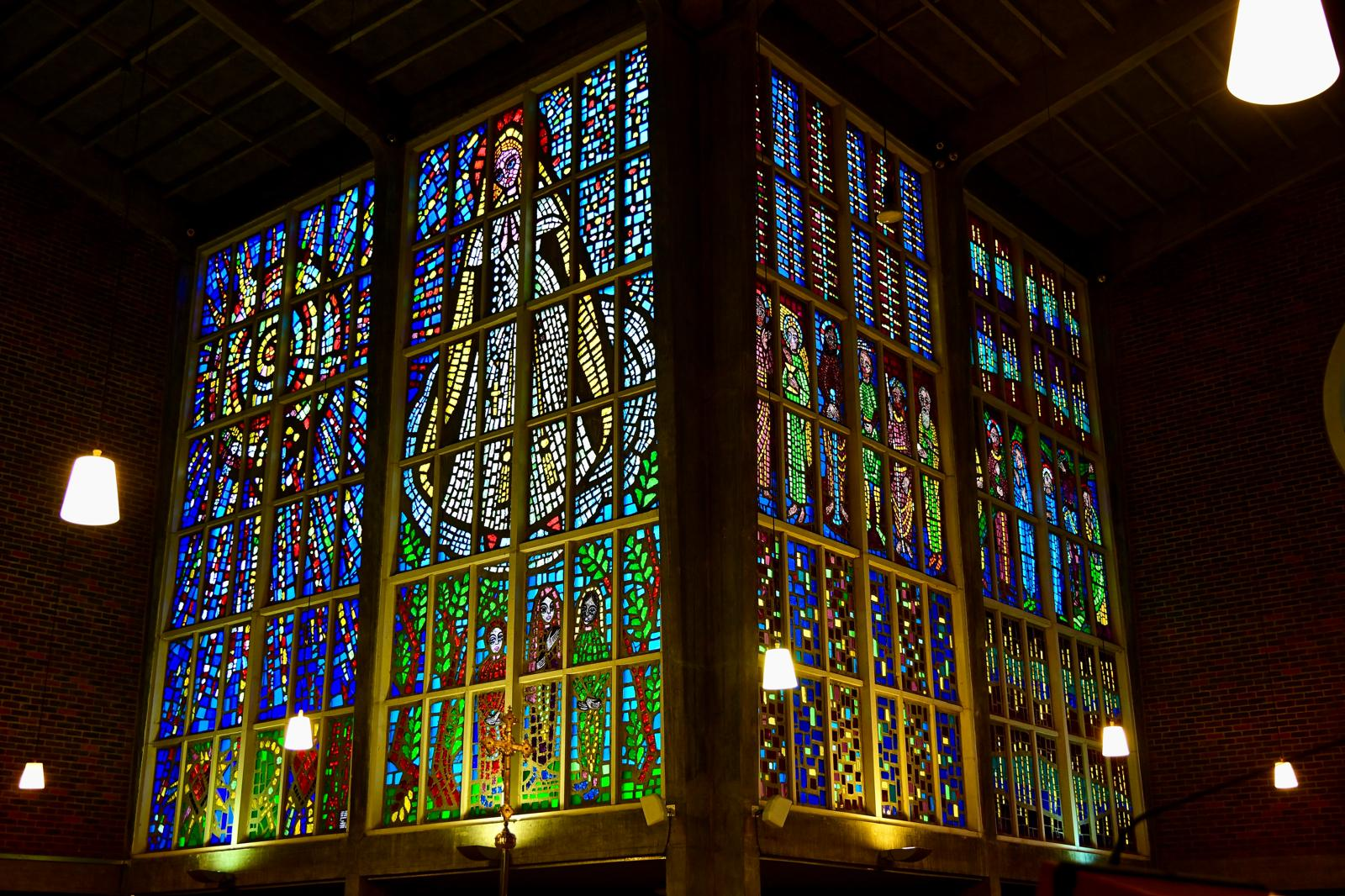
Interior north-west view.

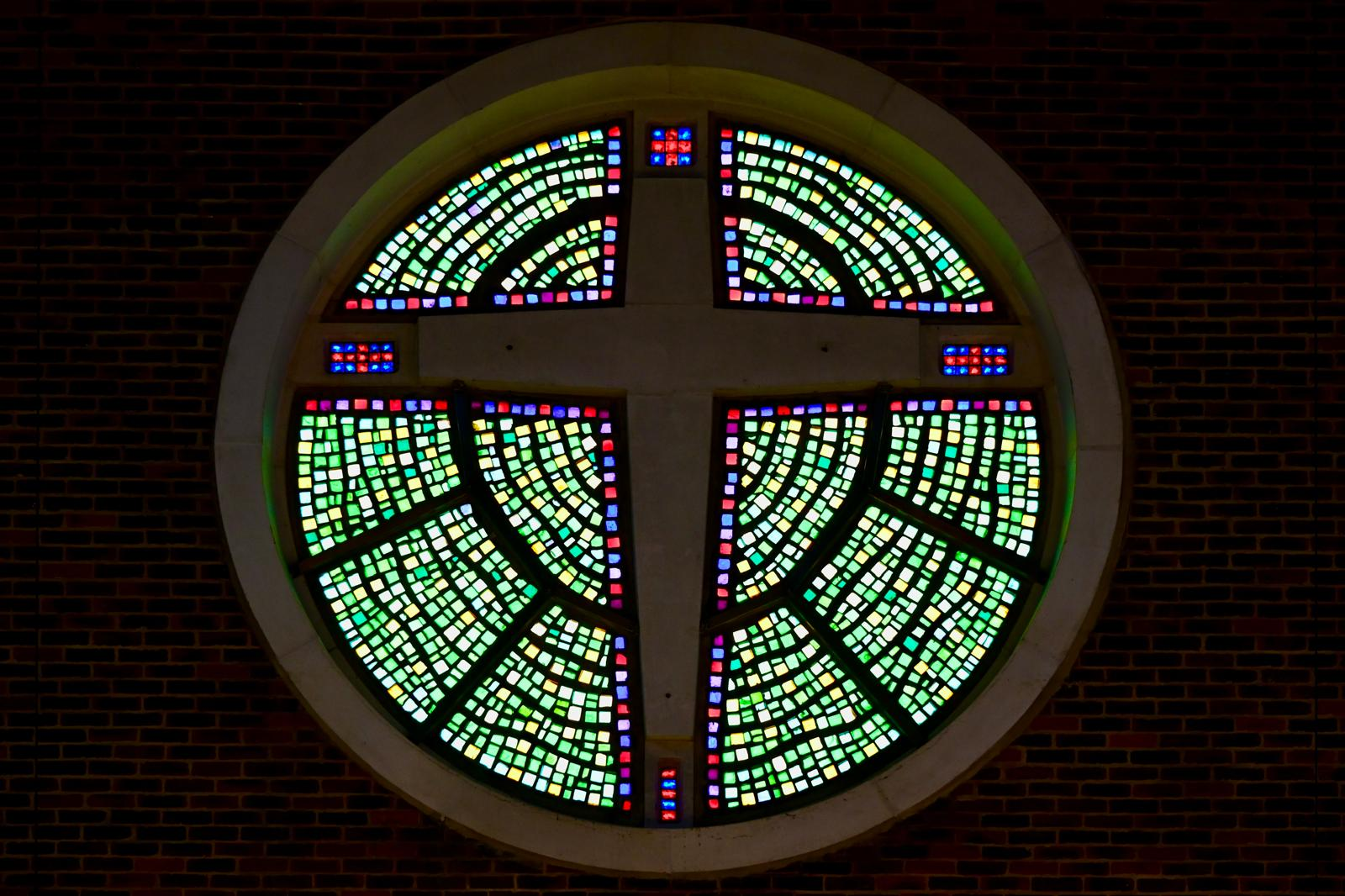
Circular window in west wall.

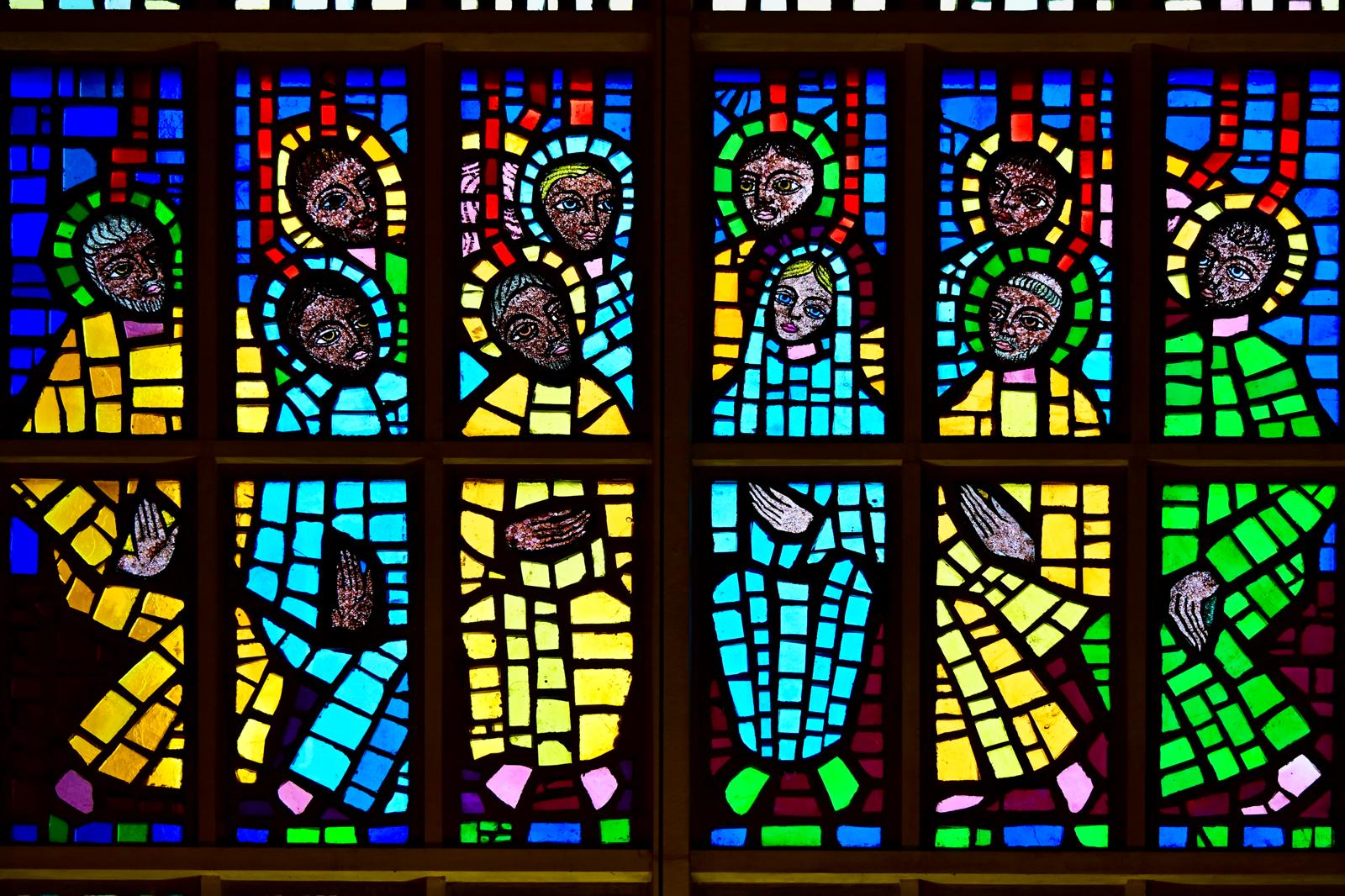
Window detail.

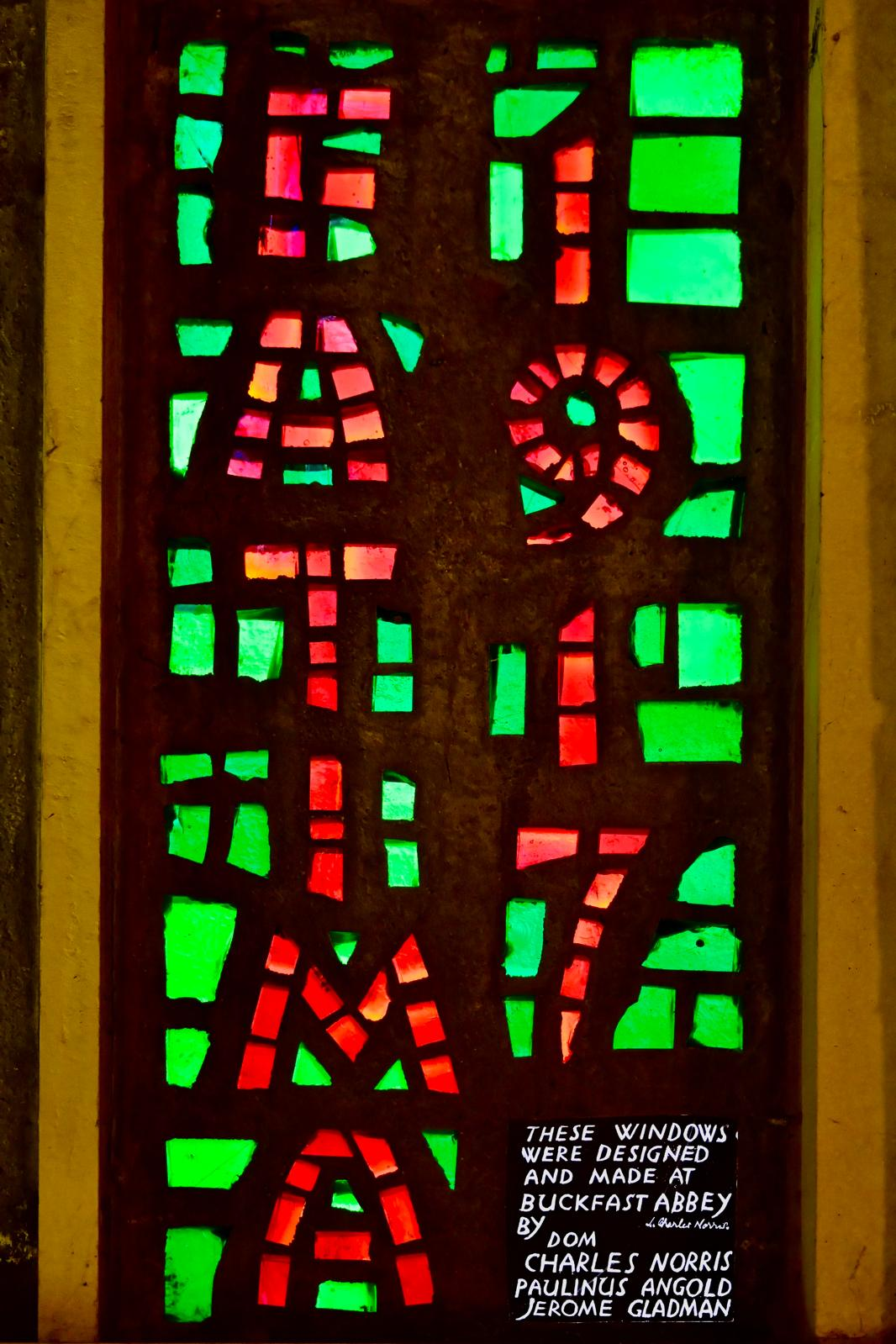
Dom Charles Norris's maker's mark.

== See also ==
- Roman Catholic Diocese of Brentwood
