= Pierre Fourmaintraux =

Glass artist

- Born: 1896; Desvres
- Died: 1974 (aged 78)
- Known for: Stained glass and dalle de verre
- Spouse: Rachel Winslow

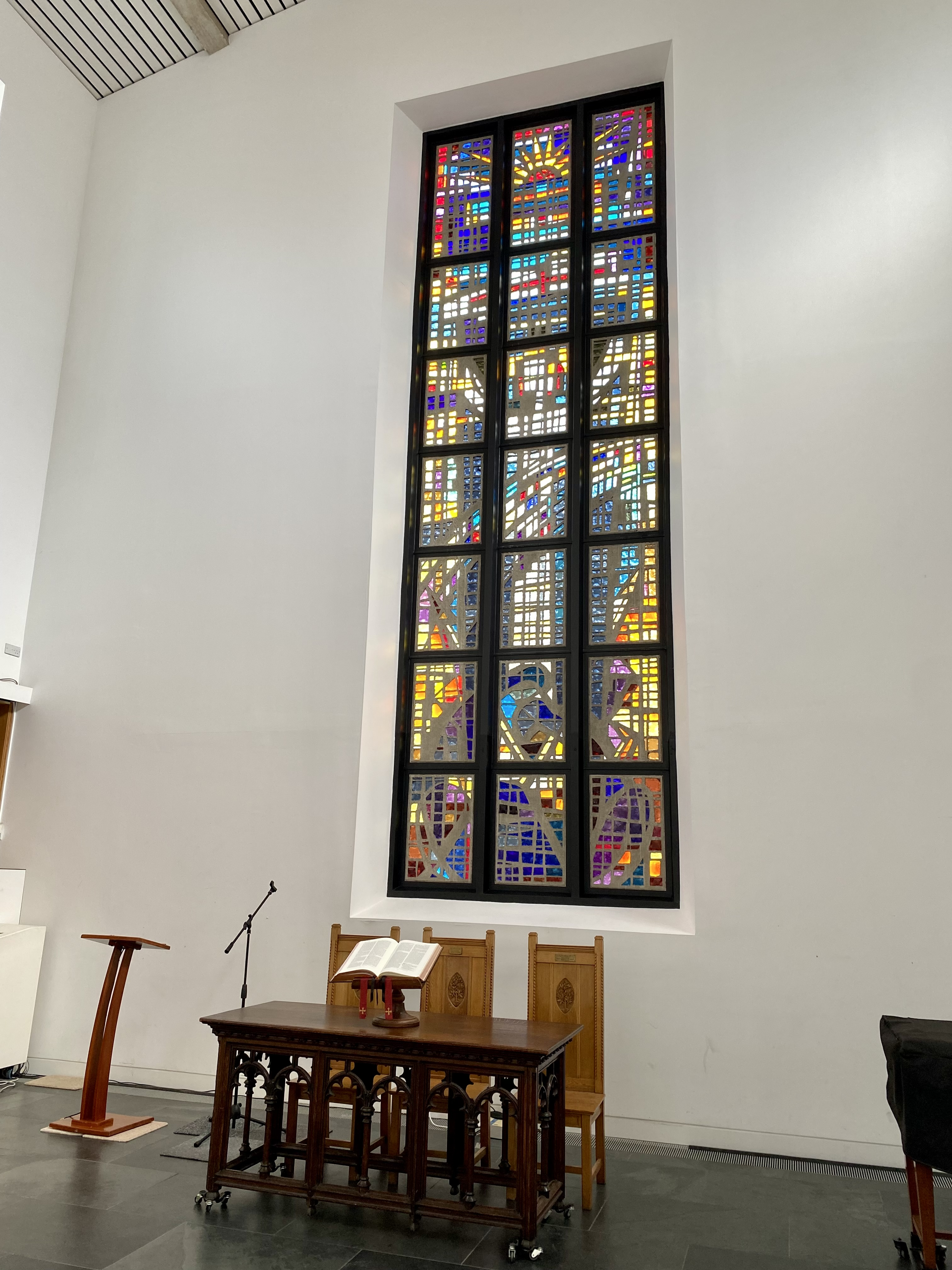
Fourmaintraux's window at the Lumen United Reform Church, Bloomsbury.

Francois Pierre Fourmaintraux (known as Pierre) (1896-1974) was a renowned glass artist who is credited with having introduced the dalle de verre technique to the UK and having taught other influential glass artists such as Dom Charles Norris.

== Personal life ==
Pierre Fourmaintraux was born Francois Pierre Fourmaintraux in Metz, France in 1896. Pierre moved to the UK and married an English wife Rachel Winslow (1880-1974), who was an impressionist painter, settling in Harrow. He retired in 1969 and died in 1974 at the age of 78.

== Career ==
While in France Fourmaintraux produced conventional leaded stained glass, but after World War II changed to the dalle de verre technique, joining James Powell and Sons (later Whitefriars Glass) in the UK. He is credited with introducing the dalle de verre technique to the UK, a technique that was already popular in France. From 1956, Fourmaintraux was Powell's chief designer of slab glass and abstract windows. His first dalle de verre for the UK was said to be two small windows for St Peter's Reigate. He is said to have taught the dalle de verre technique to Dom Charles Norris who became one of the most celebrated and prolific users of the technique. Whitefriars identified their glass with a small image of a hooded friar, usually in a bottom corner of the window. Fourmaintraux identified his own glass by adding his initials PF near the friar.

== Works ==
=== Notable buildings ===
St Raphael the Archangel, Millbrook, Stalybridge

A Grade II listed church designed by Edward J Massey of architects' practice Massey and Massey of Warrington (1961-3). The church's listing by Historic England notes: "the mosaic-like appearance of the prominent dalle de verre screen, in a bold modern design of geometric blockiness and stepped massing culminating in the dominant circular dome." It goes on to say: "the church is a showcase for contemporary arts and crafts, being embellished with Pierre Fourmaintraux's extensive figurative dalle de verre screen of Tobias and the Archangel whose brilliant colours and organic forms epitomise good 1960s ecclesiastical glass design and dramatically enrich the interior space".

English Heritage commented in a report on St Raphael's: "The screen is a good example of 1960s ecclesiastical glass design...It is a relatively early example, preceding the glass at Liverpool Cathedral, and is of interest in being figurative, rather than the more usual abstract schemes employing dalle de verre glass...Both Fourmaintraux and Boyson have listed work elsewhere and their work here undoubtedly adds to the artistic interest of the building."

The church was threatened with demolition in 2011 but was saved and listed (Grade II).

Christ Church, Frankpledge Road, Coventry

Designed by Alfred H Gardner, this Grade II listed church features dalle de verre by Fourmaintraux.

"22 square panels of thick glass set in concrete illustrating the life of Christ, by Pierre Fourmaintraux. The wealth of purple and gold contrasted with the natural timber in a variety of chequerboard designs gives a variety and vibrancy to the building rare in this period".

— Christ Church List Entry Summary, Historic England

=== Other works ===
According to Robert Proctor, Senior Lecturer in Architecture at Bath University, Fourmaintraux works include windows for:

- St Augustine, Manchester
- St Aiden, East Acton, London - windows representing six of the martyrs
- English Martyrs, Horley - stations of the cross.

Fourmaintraux also produced works for:

- The Hyde Park Chapel on Exhibition Road in London
- New Zealand’s Hall of Memory in Wellington (1964)
- Lumen Reformed Church - the Resurrection
- St Peter, Bristol.
- St Barnabas’s in Lovely Lane, Bewsey, Warrington (1963)
- St Chad's, Leasowe
- St George's Church, Britwell
- St Raphael, Yeading, London
- St Clements, Ewell - eight windows depicting the Beatitudes,
- St Helens Crematorium Chapel, St. Helens, Merseyside - Dalle de Verre windows.

=== Museums and preservation ===
In 2008 the Museum of London gifted the Rakow Library (the Research Library of the Corning Museum of Glass) the Whitefriars Collection, consisting of 1,800 cartoons (or working drawings). The Rakow Library received a grant from the Institute of Museum and Library Services to develop an innovative methodology for preserving, digitizing, and making accessible this collection. Preservation work undertaken includes cartoons from Fourmaintraux's windows in St. Peter’s Church, Lawrence Weston, Bristol, and for the War Memorial in Auckland, New Zealand.

A pen and ink and watercolour drawing for Fourmaintraux's design of an abstract dalle de verre window for the 'Golden Ball', public house, Campo Lane, Sheffield is now in the Victoria and Albert Museum, London. The museum also holds a pen and ink and watercolour drawing for 15 small stained-glass windows of abstract design for Narberth Crematorium, near Porthcawl.
