= St Mary's Church, Grantham =

St Mary's Church
- St Mary the Immaculate Church
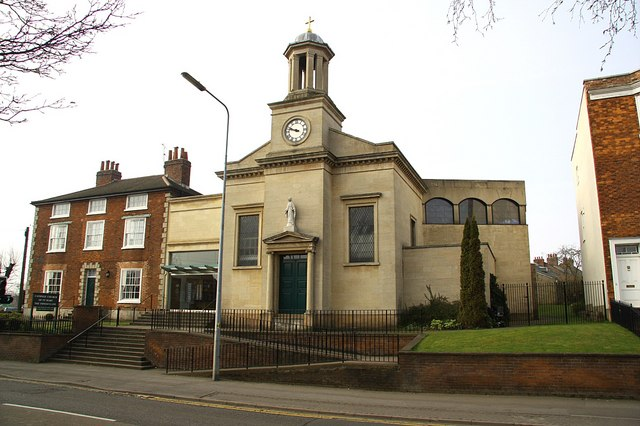
- St Mary's Church
- 52.9159°N 0.6458°W
- OS grid reference: SK 91157 36245
- Location: Grantham
- Country: England
- Denomination: Roman Catholic
- Website: StMarysCatholicChurch.co.uk

History
- Status: Active
- Founder: Thomas Tempest
- Dedication: Saint Mary

Architecture
- Functional status: Parish church
- Heritage designation: Grade II listed
- Designated: 8 May 1950
- Architect(s): E. J. Willson; Gerard Goalen
- Style: Neoclassical
- Groundbreaking: 1831
- Completed: 1833

Administration
- Province: Westminster
- Diocese: Nottingham
- Deanery: Grantham
- Parish: St Mary's

St Mary's Church or St Mary the Immaculate Church is a Roman Catholic parish church in Grantham, Lincolnshire, England. It was built in phases from 1833 to the 1960s and initially designed by E. J. Willson in the neoclassical style, and later by Gerard Goalen. It is located on the corner of North Parade and Barrowby Road to the north of the town centre. It is a Grade II listed building.

== History ==
=== Construction ===
In 1830, Thomas Tempest bought the site of the current church. He also paid for the church's construction. In 1831, the foundation stone was laid. In 1833, the first Mass was celebrated. The architect was E. J. Willson who designed the church in the neoclassical style and linked to the presbytery, which was built in 1829. In 1833, a school was built. In 1859, the school was rebuilt. In 1928, the school was relocated. In 1884, the western apse was added.

=== Extension ===
From 1964 to 1965, the church was extended northwards. The old sacristy became the baptistry. The entrance was moved to current location. The architect was Gerard Goalen. The mixture of classical and modern, according to Historic England created an "attractive working church", with the modern additions being "of merit".

== Parish ==
St Mary's Church is its own parish. It has two Sunday Masses at 6:00pm on Saturday and at 9:30am on Sunday.

== See also ==
- Diocese of Nottingham
- Media related to St Mary's church, Grantham, Lincolnshire at Wikimedia Commons
