= Dom Charles Norris =

English monk and stained-glass artist (1909–2004)

Charles Norris OSB (1909–2004) was a Benedictine monk and dalle de verre stained glass artist who created works for Roman Catholic churches in the UK.

== Life and work ==
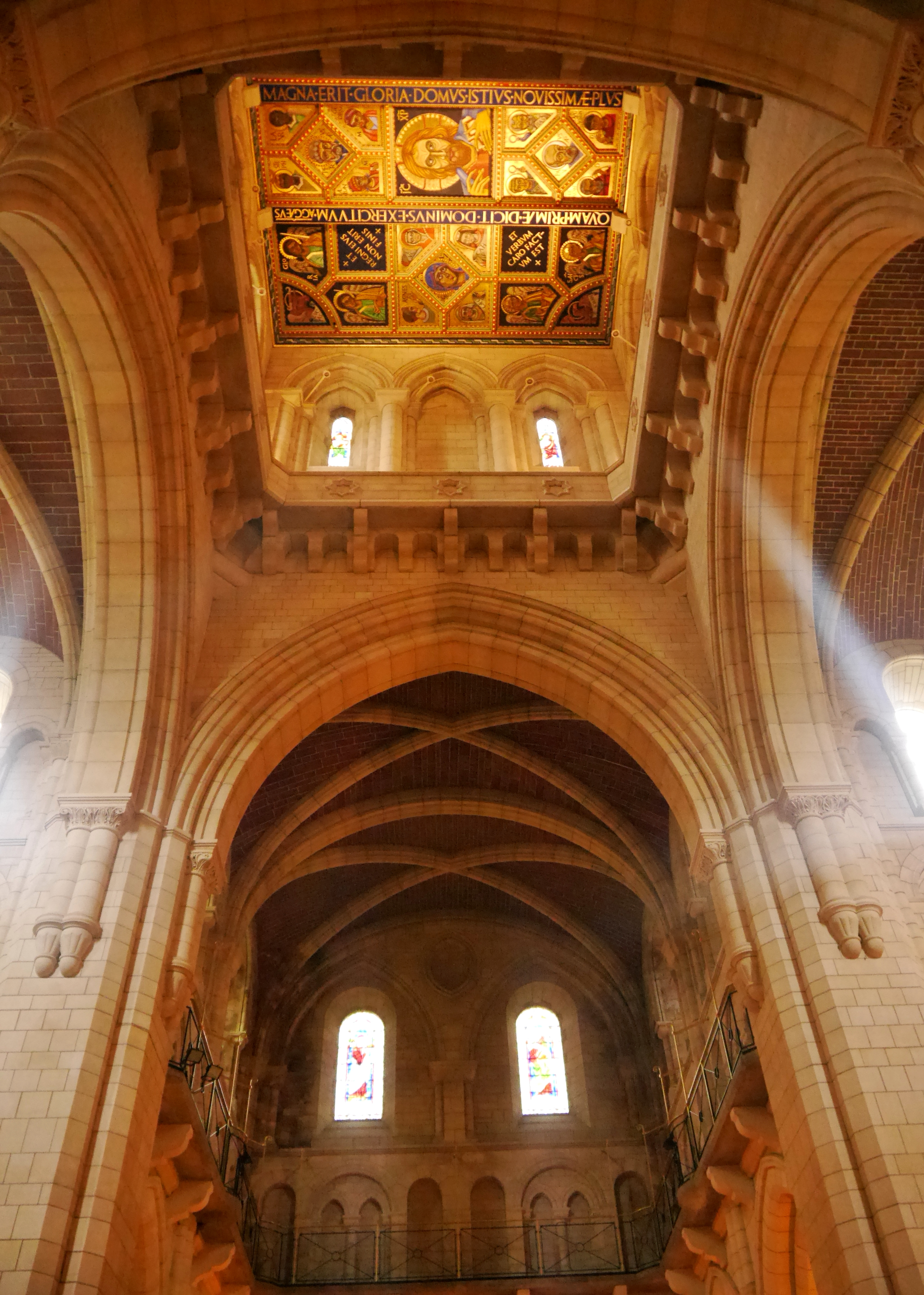
The ceiling of the Lantern Tower, painted by Dom Charles Norris, 1939

Dom Charles Norris (1909-2004) was a Benedictine monk and glass artist He was born Louis Charles Norris and he studied at the Royal College of Art in the 1920s. He entered Buckfast Abbey in 1930 as the age of 21 and began to work as a stained glass artist in 1933. He supervised a team of monks to rebuild the abbey, including the east window in dalle de verre in the Blessed Sacrament Chapel. Pierre Fourmaintraux is said to have brought the dalle de verre technique to Britain before joining James Powell and Sons (later Whitefriars Glass Studio) in 1956. He trained Dom Charles Norris in the technique, with Norris becoming one of the most prolific British proponents. Norris's design of the east window is mentioned in the List Entry Summary for Buckfast Abbey on the Historic England site.

In addition to his work in the workshops of Buckfast Abbey, Dom Charles Norris also had an association with the workshop at Prinknash Abbey and with Aylesford Priory in Kent.

"After 1949 Aylesford Priory in Kent became a creative hub, attracting artists such as Adam Kossowski (a Polish émigré, and survivor of the Soviet gulag, Fig.12), Philip Lindsey Clark, Michael Clark, and the glass maker Dom Charles Norris of Buckfast Abbey."

— Andrew Derrick for Historic England, 19th- and 20th-Century Roman Catholic Churches Introductions to Heritage Assets

Dom Charles Norris completed windows for a large number of churches including those at Perranporth Our Lady's, Lillington and Our Lady of Fatima church, Harlow, Essex.

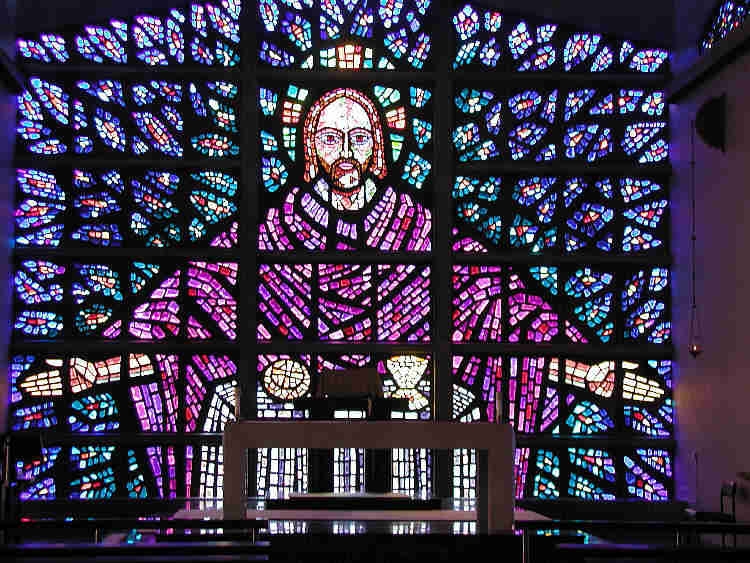
Stained glass window at Buckfast Abbey, 1965

== Works ==
=== Buckfast Abbey ===
"It was this English monk, Dom Charles Norris, who after a training at the Royal College of Art began to create Buckfast's amazing stained glass in 1932. He, too, was responsible for painting the Lantern Tower in egg tempera in 1939, for the mosaic flooring in the Sanctuary and Crossing in 1943/47 and the pavement in the Choir and Lady Chapel of 1958."

— Jennifer Freeman, "The Chapels Society, Buckfast Abbey"

- Painted the lantern tower ceiling in egg-tempera (1939).
- Designed the marble pavement in the choir (1949).
- Laid the floor in the Lady Chapel (1958).
- Stained glass window at Buckfast Abbey (1965).
- East window in the Blessed Sacrament Chapel (1968).

=== Work on listed buildings ===
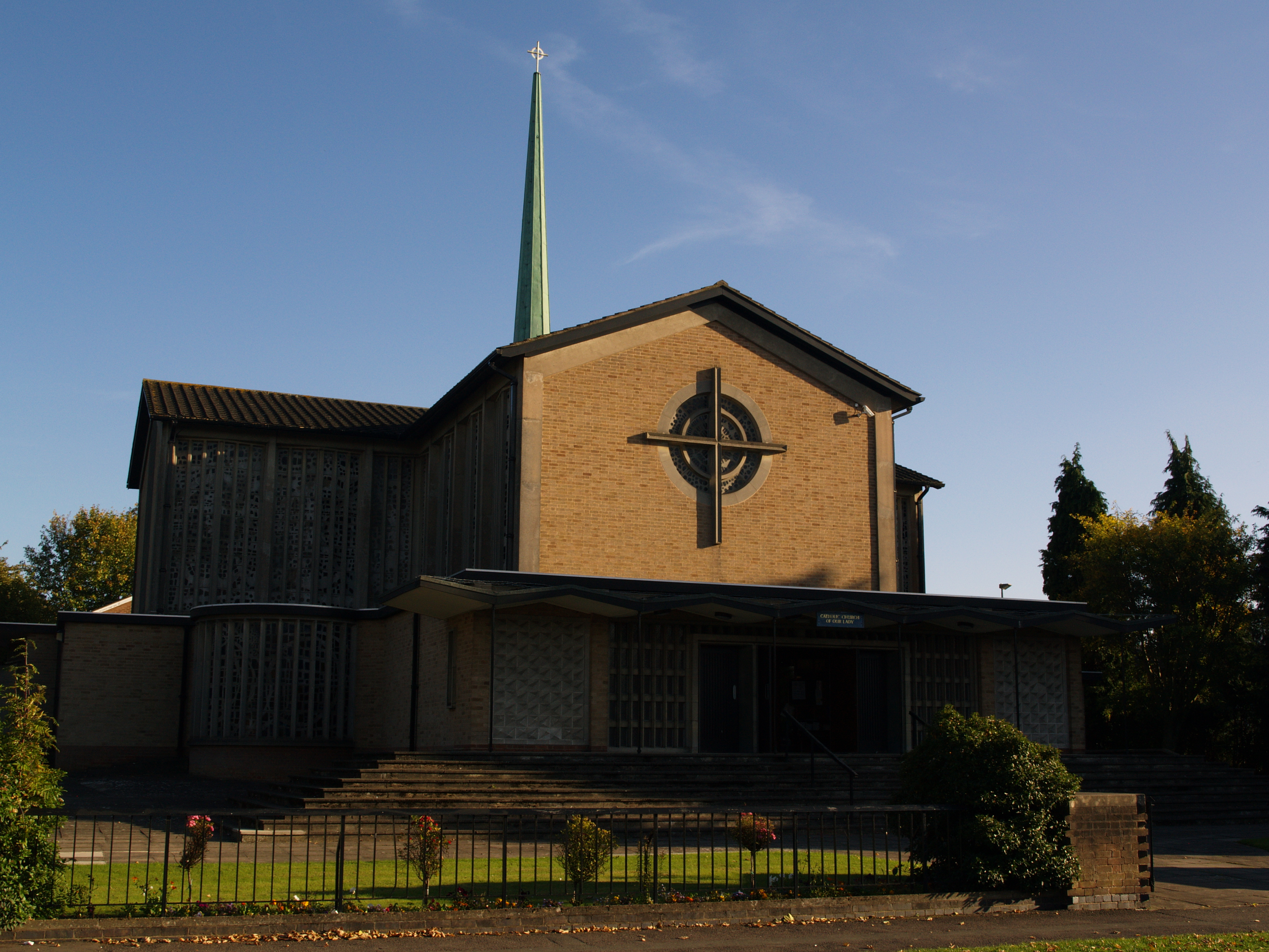
Church of Our Lady Lillington, Grade II listed, showing dalle de verre walls on left hand side of building

Many of the listings of notable 20th century churches include references to the importance of Dom Charles Norris's work. He collaborated on several listed churches with notable 20th century architect Gerard Goalen and artist Steven Sykes.

St Gregory the Great, South Ruislip - Grade II listed

Designed by Gerard Goalen in 1965.

Church of Our Lady Lillington - Grade II listed

A Roman Catholic church, built in 1963, by Henry Fedeski ARIBA, with extensive dalle-de-verre glass by Dom Charles Norris OSB of Buckfast Abbey, and mosaic by Steven Sykes. Although designed by Norris, the glass itself was made at Prinknash Abbey.

Our Lady of Fatima Church, Harlow - Grade II* listed A Roman Catholic church designed 1953-4 by Gerard Goalen and built 1958–60. The entire glazing scheme was designed and made at Buckfast Abbey by Norris with the assistance of Paulinus Angold and Jerome Gladman. Installed during the construction of the building, the windows are architecturally integral to Goalen's modernist design. Based on a Greek-cross plan, he engaged Norris to provide glass using the dalle de verre technique, which fill each of the large window expanses in 8 of the church's 12 walls, with smaller circular windows inserted into three of the remaining walls. Only the wall behind the chancel has no glazing. As a result, Norris's glasswork covers some 60 per cent of the church's interior walling, creating what The Twentieth Century Society described as a "kaleidoscopic [effect of] glorious colour and light". The society's senior casework officer, Clare Price, wrote that Our Lady's was a "pioneer of a unified scheme of dalle de verre glass and modern design".

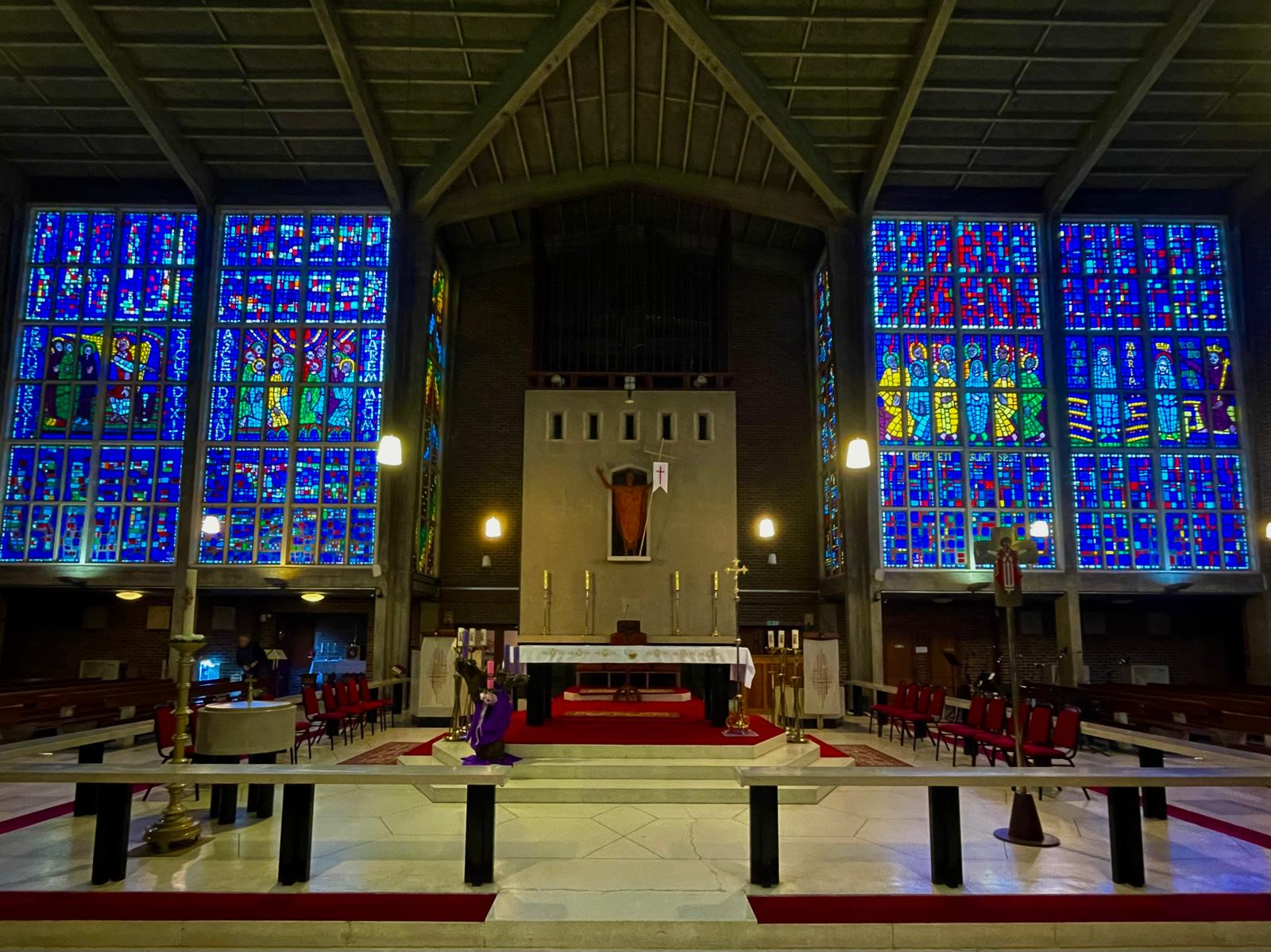
Our Lady of Fatima Church in Harlow, view towards chancel.

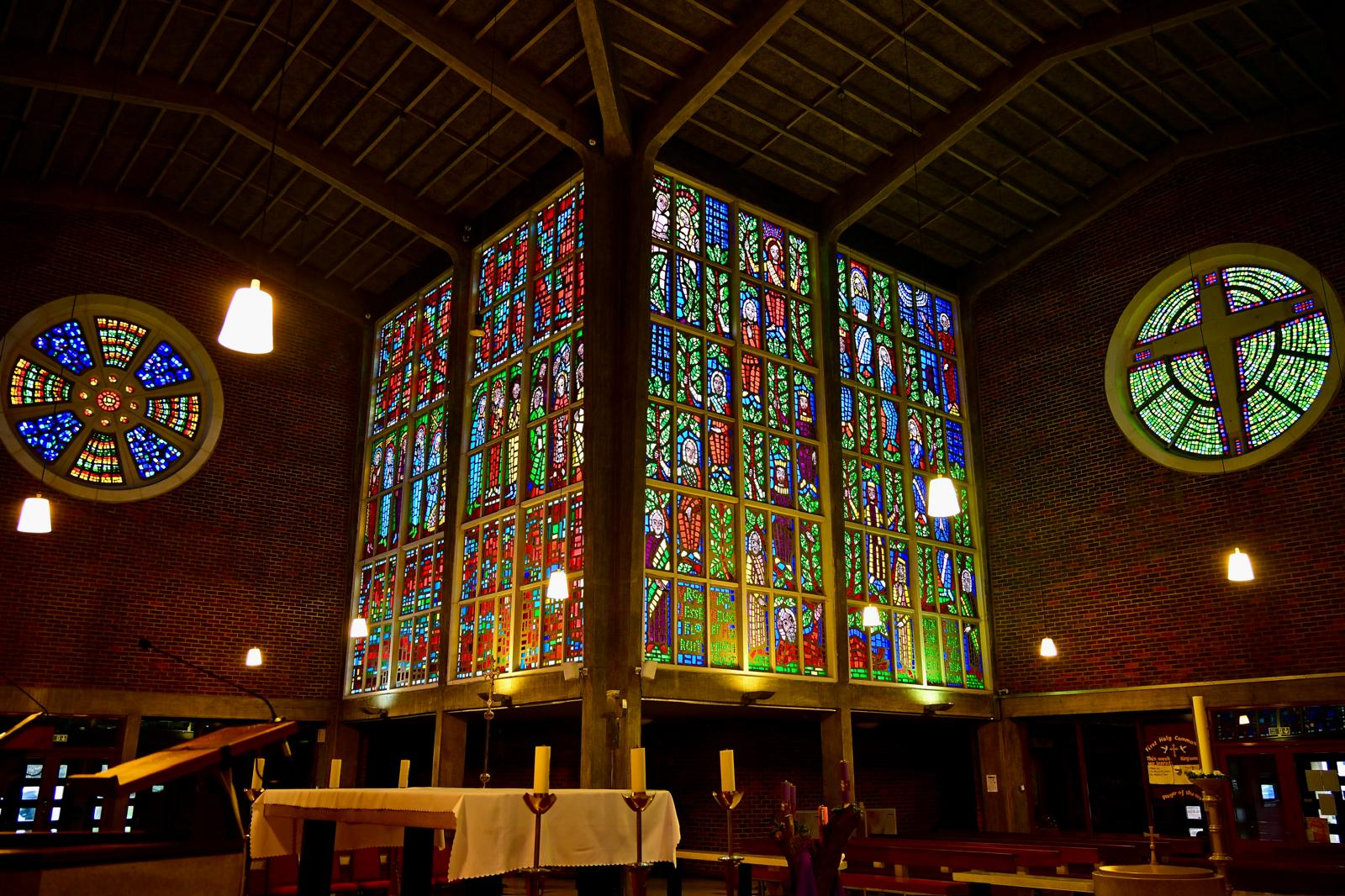
Our Lady of Fatima Church, Harlow - south-west view.

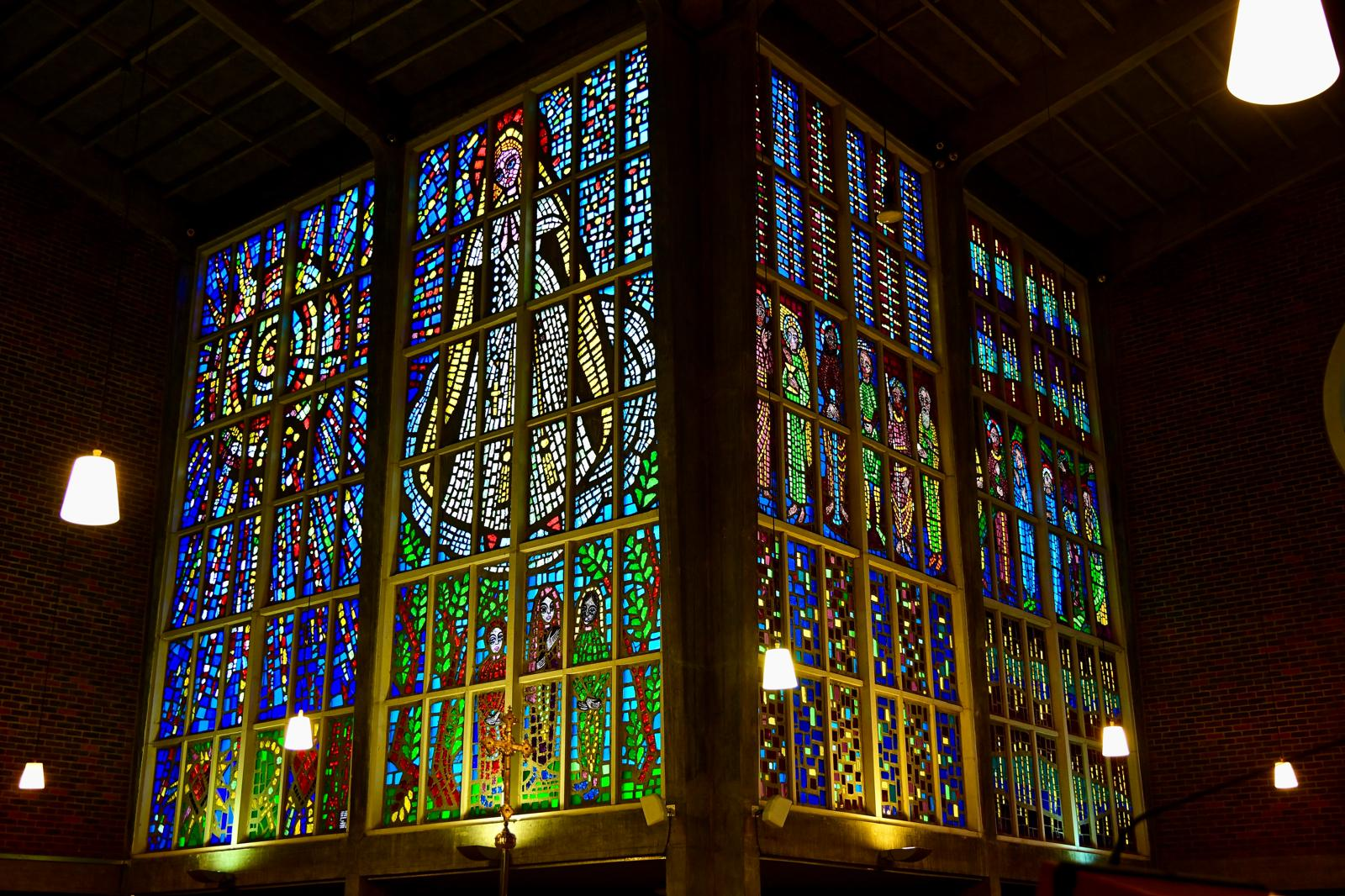
Our Lady of Fatima Church, Harlow - north-west view.

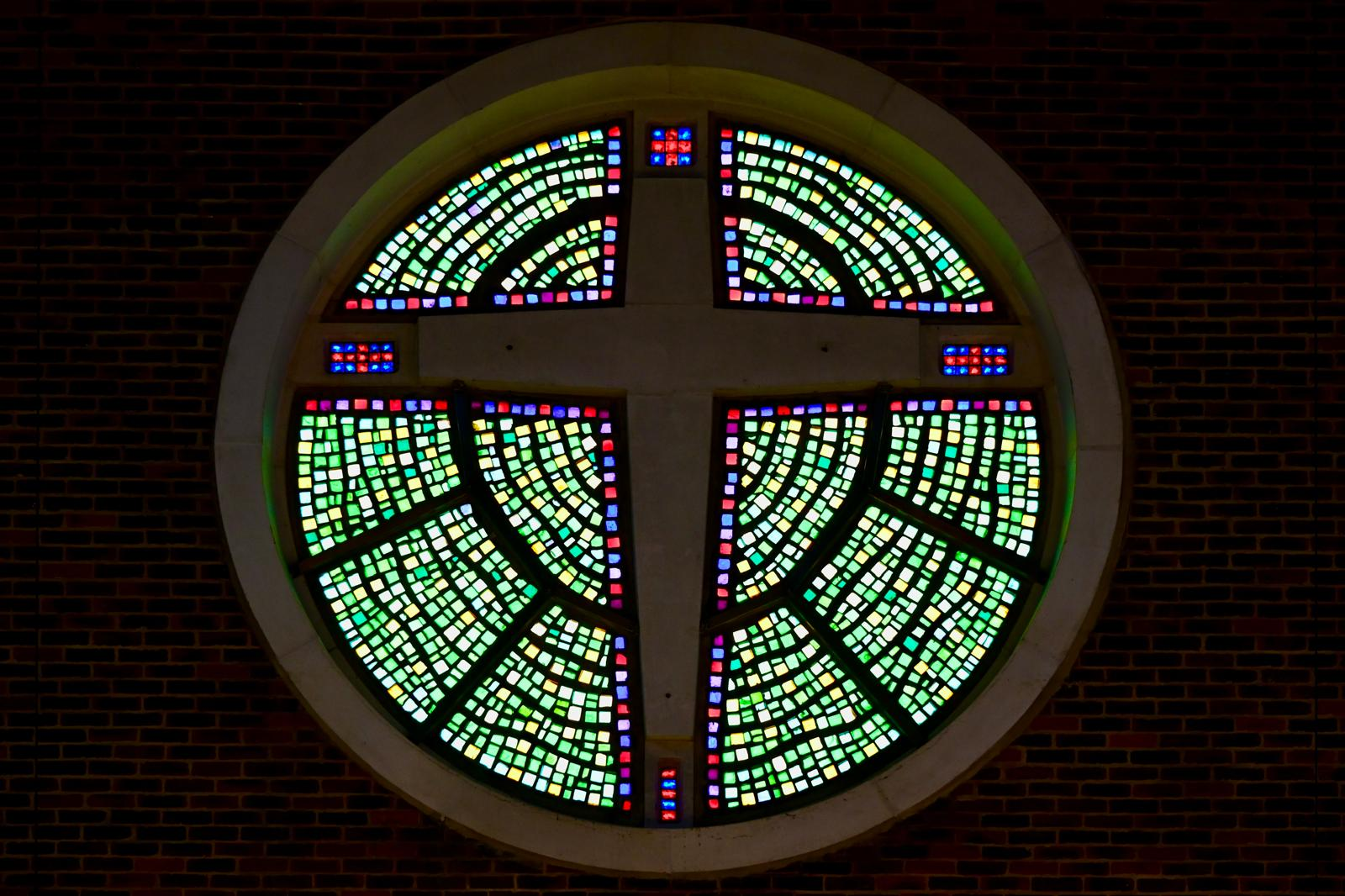
Our Lady of Fatima Church, Harlow - circular window in west wall.

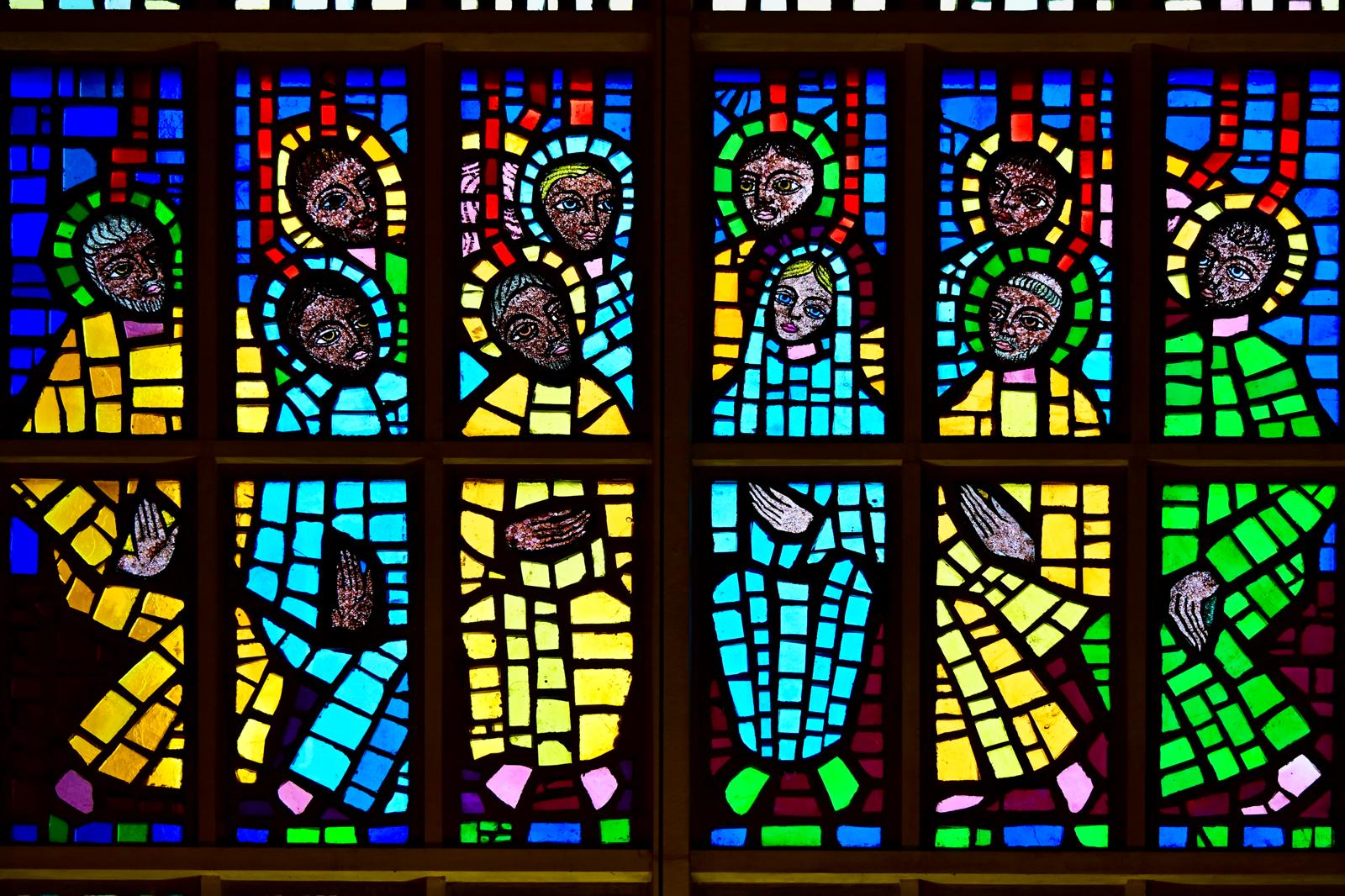
Our Lady of Fatima Church, Harlow - detail.

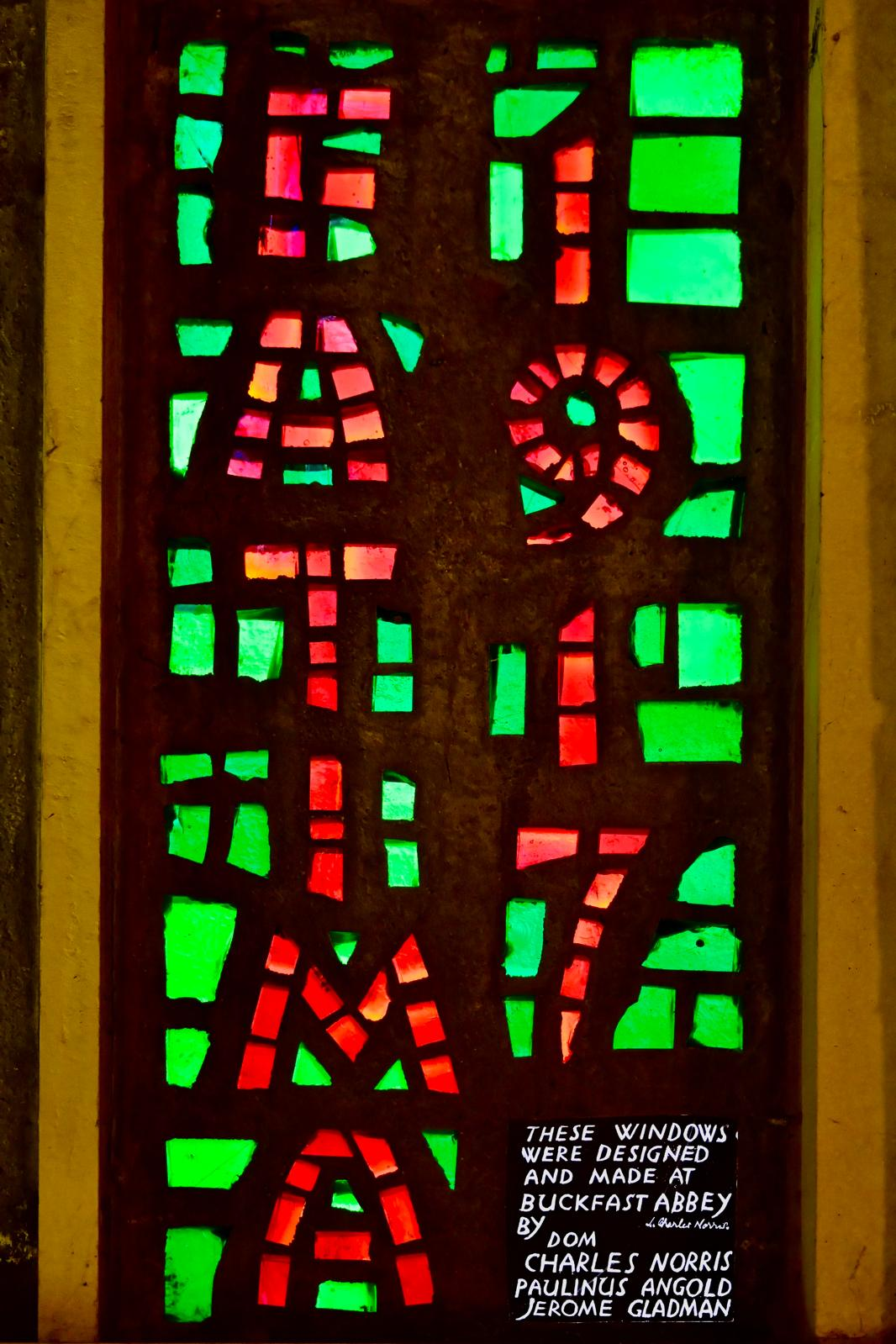
Our Lady of Fatima Church, Harlow - maker's mark.

Marychurch, Hatfield - Grade II listed

A Roman Catholic church designed in 1970 by George Mathers. Historic England cites the glasswork as one of the reasons for the church's listing.

The Parish Church of St John The Evangelist, Exmouth - Grade II listed

This church was reordered in 1964 and at that time a dalle-de-verre screen by Dom Charles Norris was added. Historic England highlights the screen in its listing noting how Dom Charles Norris's work in this material "became well-known and influential".

Church of the Holy Redeemer, St Wulstan and St Eadburga, Pershore - Grade II listed

A Roman Catholic church designed by Scottish architect Hugh Bankart ARIBA, FRIBA in 1958–59, which includes a three-light dalle-de-verre west window by Dom Charles Norris.

Shrine of Our Lady of Mount Carmel and St Simon Stock, Aylesford - Grade II* listed

The Roman Catholic Shrine was designed by Adrian Gilbert Scott. It contains works by a large number of notable artists including (in the Relic Chapel) "four pairs of semi-abstract dalle de verre windows made by Dom Charles Norris from Kossowski's designs". Norris also contributed the windows in the exedra chapels.

Church of St Bernadette, Belfast - Grade B+ listed

A fan-shaped Roman Catholic church capable of seating over 1000 people which was designed by Brian Gregory and opened in 1967. It contains many works of modern art, most notably a nine-foot-high Crucifixion sculpture by Elisabeth Frink. Dom Charles Norris' dalle-de-verre windows form the whole of the curved façade of the building.

=== Other churches ===
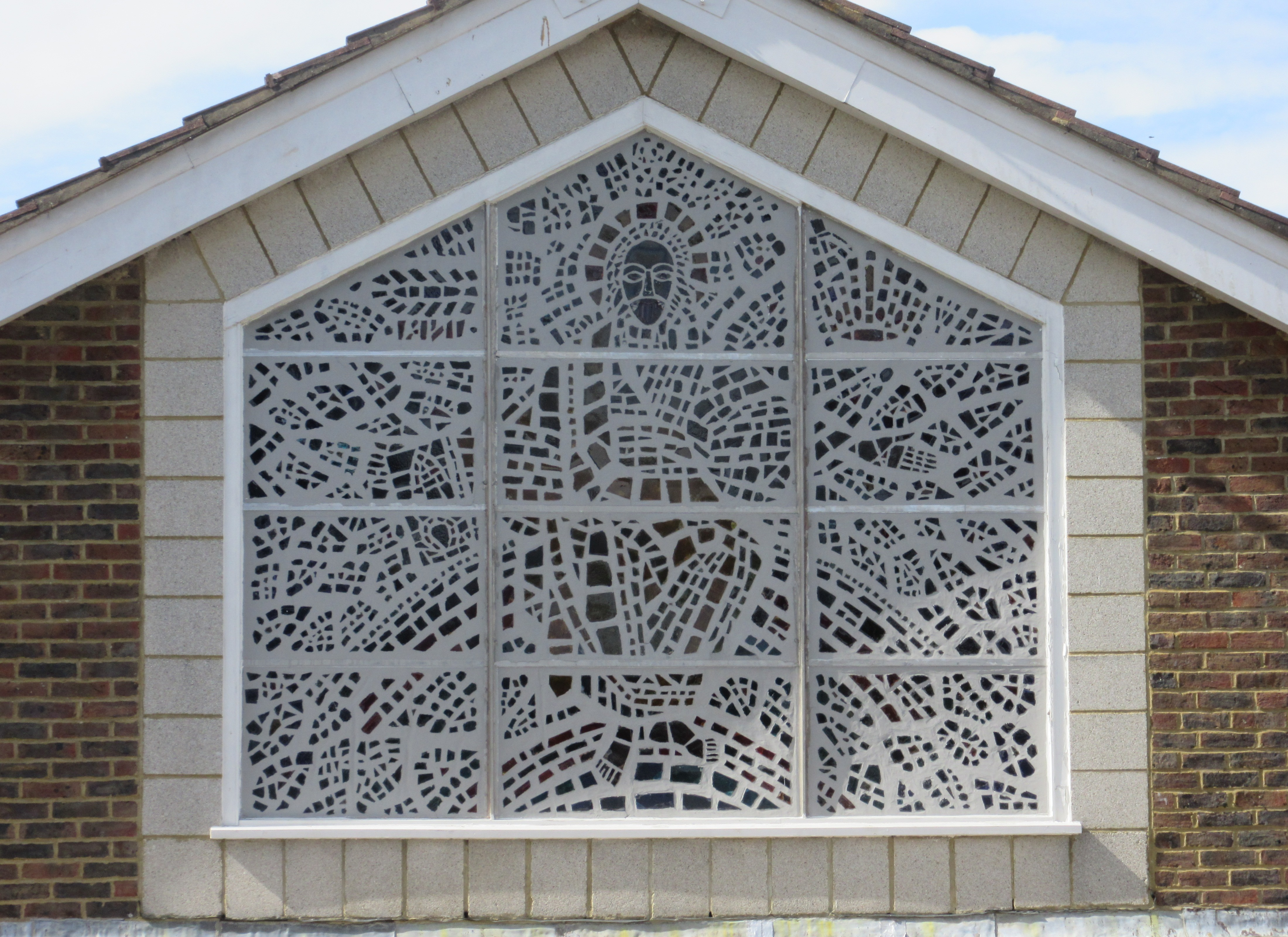
Church of Christ the King, Burwash showing dalle de verre from outside of building

Norris created works in dalle de verre and stained glass for Roman Catholic churches around the UK including: St Paul the Apostle (Tintagel, Cornwall), Church of St Winefride (Welshpool, Powys), Church of the Good Shepherd (Nottingham), St Mary (Barnstaple), Our Lady of Victories (Callington), Christ the King (Perranporth, Cornwall), Our Lady Star of the Sea (St Agnes, Cornwall), St Joseph (Shaw), St Margaret Mary (Plymstock), St Joseph (Accrington), Good Shepherd (New Addington), St Philip and St James (Herne Hill), Holy Rood (Swindon), St Theresa of Lisieux (Lexden), St Vincent de Paul (Rochdale), St Joseph (Blackburn), St Hugh of Lincoln (Manchester), English Martyrs (Sparkhill, Birmingham), Our Lady of Light (Long Crenden), St Bernadine of Siena (Buckingham), St Boniface (Crediton), St Joseph (Wroughton), Holy Redeemer, Our Lady of the Immaculate Conception (St Elmo's Road, London SE16), Our Lady of the Portal and St Piran (Truro), St Mary Immaculate (Falmouth), St Joseph (Weston Super Mare), Sacred Heart and St Ia (St Ives), St Mary (Alton), Christ the King (Milnthorpe), St Patrick (Jersey), Sacred Heart (Westbury-on-Trym), Christ the King (Burwash), Saint Bernard (Knott End).

== Books ==
- Buckfast Abbey, Burleigh (date?)
- Buckfast Abbey A Pictorial Survey, Buckfast Abbey Publications (1938)
- Buckfast Abbey Works of Art, Curwen Press (date?)
