= St Francis of Assisi Church, Stratford =

St Francis of Assisi Church
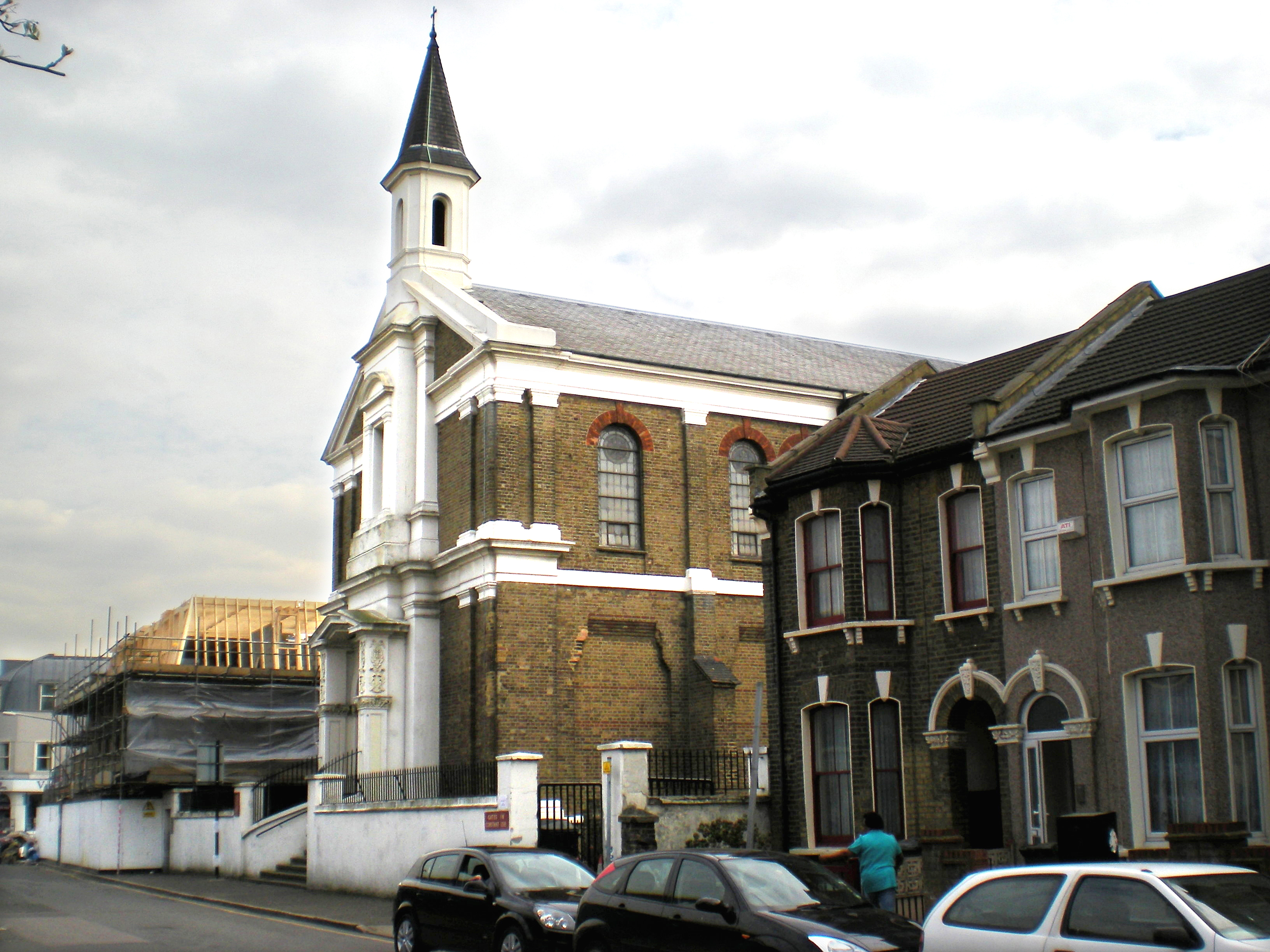
- St Francis of Assisi Church
- 51.544640°N 0.003758°E
- Location: Stratford, London
- Country: England
- Denomination: Roman Catholic
- Religious institute: Order of Friars Minor
- Website: stfrancisassisistratford.com

History
- Former name: St Vincent de Paul Church
- Status: Active
- Founded: 1770

Architecture
- Style: Neoclassical
- Completed: 12 May 1868
- Construction cost: £6,000

Administration
- Province: Westminster
- Diocese: Brentwood
- Deanery: Newham
- Parish: Stratford

St Francis of Assisi Church is a Roman Catholic parish church in Stratford, London. It was founded from a mission that started in 1770. The church itself was built in 1868. The church is located on the corner of Grove Crescent Road and The Grove, and is accessible from both streets. The Franciscan Order of Friars Minor arrived in 1873, built a friary next door to the church in 1876 and continue to serve the parish.

== History ==
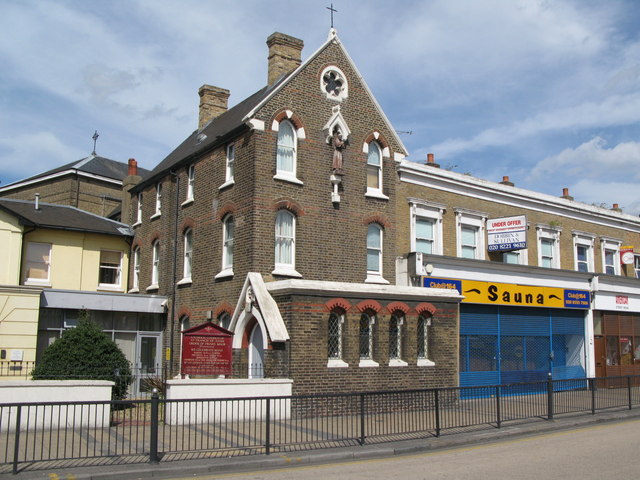
Friary with the church behind it

=== Foundation ===
In 1770, a mission was started in Stratford, London to serve the local Catholic community. The first surviving baptism records start in 1773. In 1788, Mass was being said by a Fr Thomas Wright in a rented house in Plaistow. In 1791, he registered a rented house in West Ham Lane as a place of worship. In 1799, he was succeeded by John Jones, John Singleton in 1801 and then Joseph Porter in 1802, who set about building the local Catholic school but ran away in 1810 when the school was in debt. In 1810, a French priest, J. F. Chevrollais took over the mission. In 1813, a school and St Patrick and St Vincent de Paul Church were built on the High Street.

=== Construction ===
With the Catholic community growing, a new larger church and school were needed. In 1861, the present site of the church was bought from a Charles Walker by a Fr James McQuoin. Construction work started and on 12 May 1868, St Vincent de Paul Church was opened by the Archbishop of Westminster Henry Manning. The cost was £6,000 and the construction was done by Messrs Bird of Stratford. The church was built to have a school on the ground floor and a church on the upper floor.

=== Franciscans ===
In 1873, the Franciscan Friars came to Stratford and changed the name of the church from St Vincent de Paul Church to St Francis of Assisi Church. They lived in two houses on The Grove, and extended the houses, making it a friary in 1876. In 1931, the sanctuary was refurbished with the addition of a new altar and reredos. The centre of the reredos is a painting of Francis of Assisi by Bartolomeo Carducci. The painting was looted by Napoleon from a Franciscan church in Spain. It was later bought at auction in Paris by a Colonel Bigge, who then gave to the Stewart family in Appin, Argyllshire. In 1926, they permanently loaned it to Franciscans.

== Parish ==
The Franciscans continue to serve the parish. There are four Sunday Masses in the church at 6:00pm on Saturday, and 9:00am, 10:30am and 12 midday on Sunday.

== See also ==
- Diocese of Brentwood
