= Dalle de verre =

Cast glass art technique

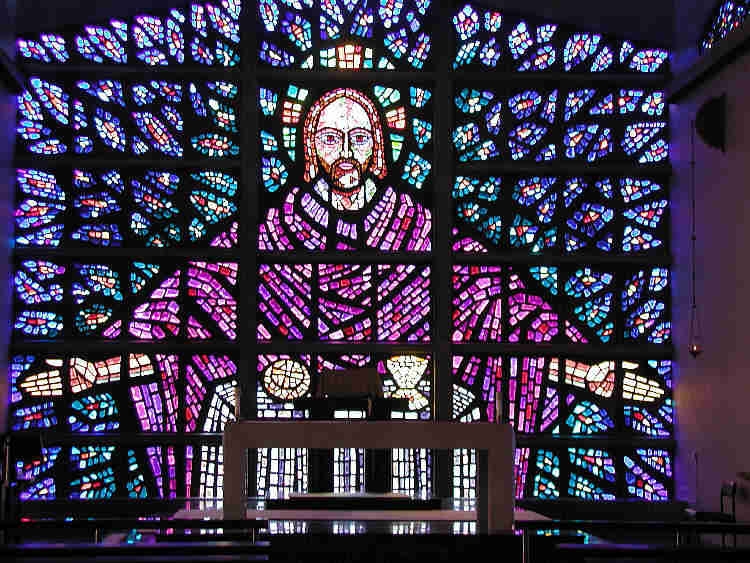
Dalle de verre at Buckfast Abbey, Dom Charles Norris

Dalle de verre, from French: "glass slab", is a glass art technique that uses pieces of coloured glass set in a matrix of epoxy resin or other supporting material.

== Technique ==
The technique was developed by Jean Gaudin in Paris in the 1930s. Slabs of coloured glass, 20 centimetres (7.9 in) to 30 centimetres (12 in) square or rectangular and typically up to 3 centimetres (1.2 in) thick, are shaped by breaking with a hammer or cutting with a saw. The edges of the resulting pieces may be chipped or faceted to increase the refraction and reflection effects.

The pieces are laid out to a design, similar to traditional stained-glass work. The pieces are laid on a bed of sand, bounded by a wooden casting frame. A matrix material is poured between the glass pieces and allowed to dry, typically requiring 24 hours to harden. The resulting solid panel is quite durable and appropriate for architectural settings or outdoor panels.

The use of thicker glass produces deeper colour effects than traditional lead came stained-glass, especially when illuminated by bright natural or artificial light.

The technique achieved prominence in the stained glass literature of the 1950s and 1960s.

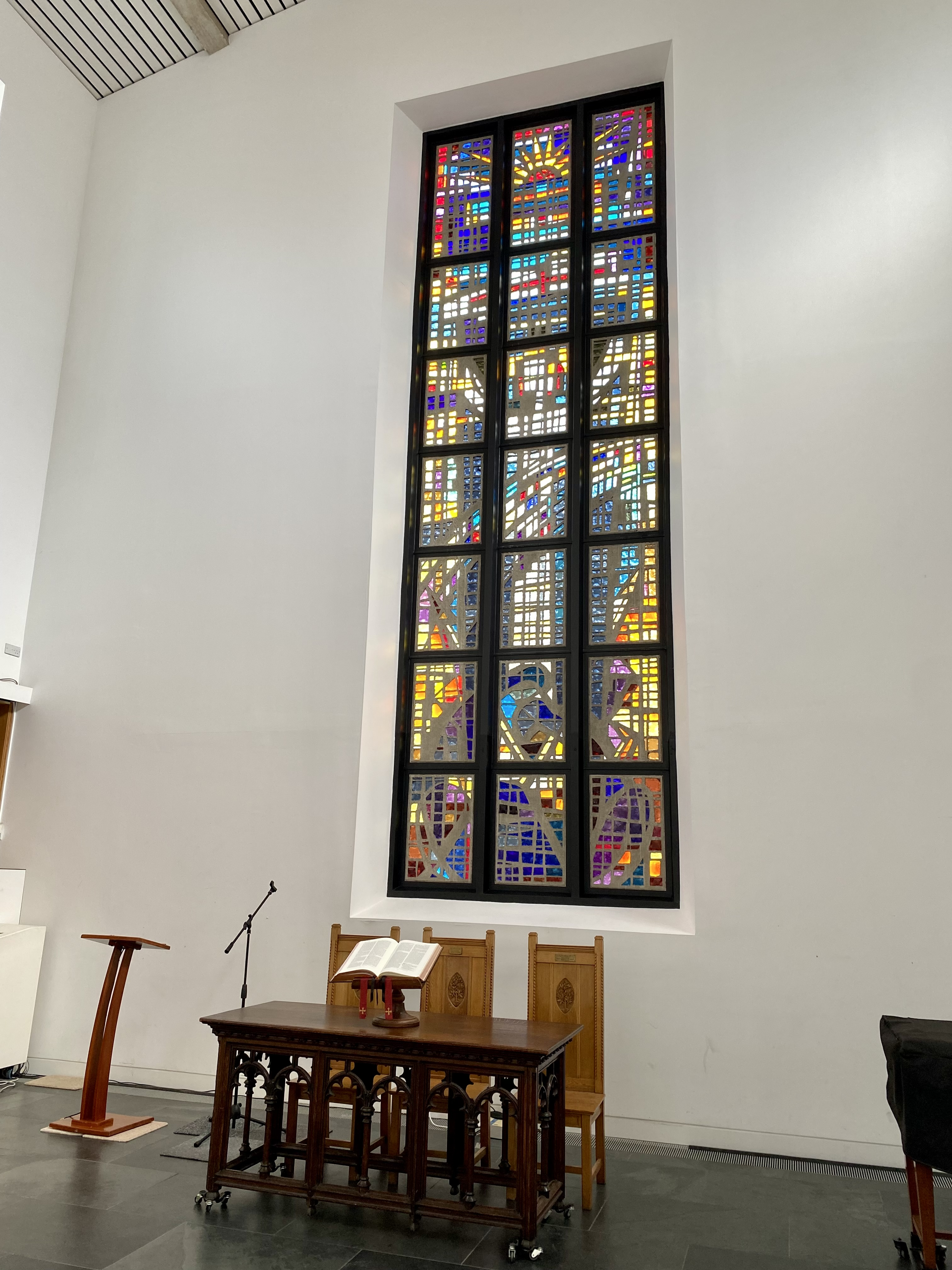
Fourmaintraux's window at the Lumen United Reform Church, Bloomsbury.

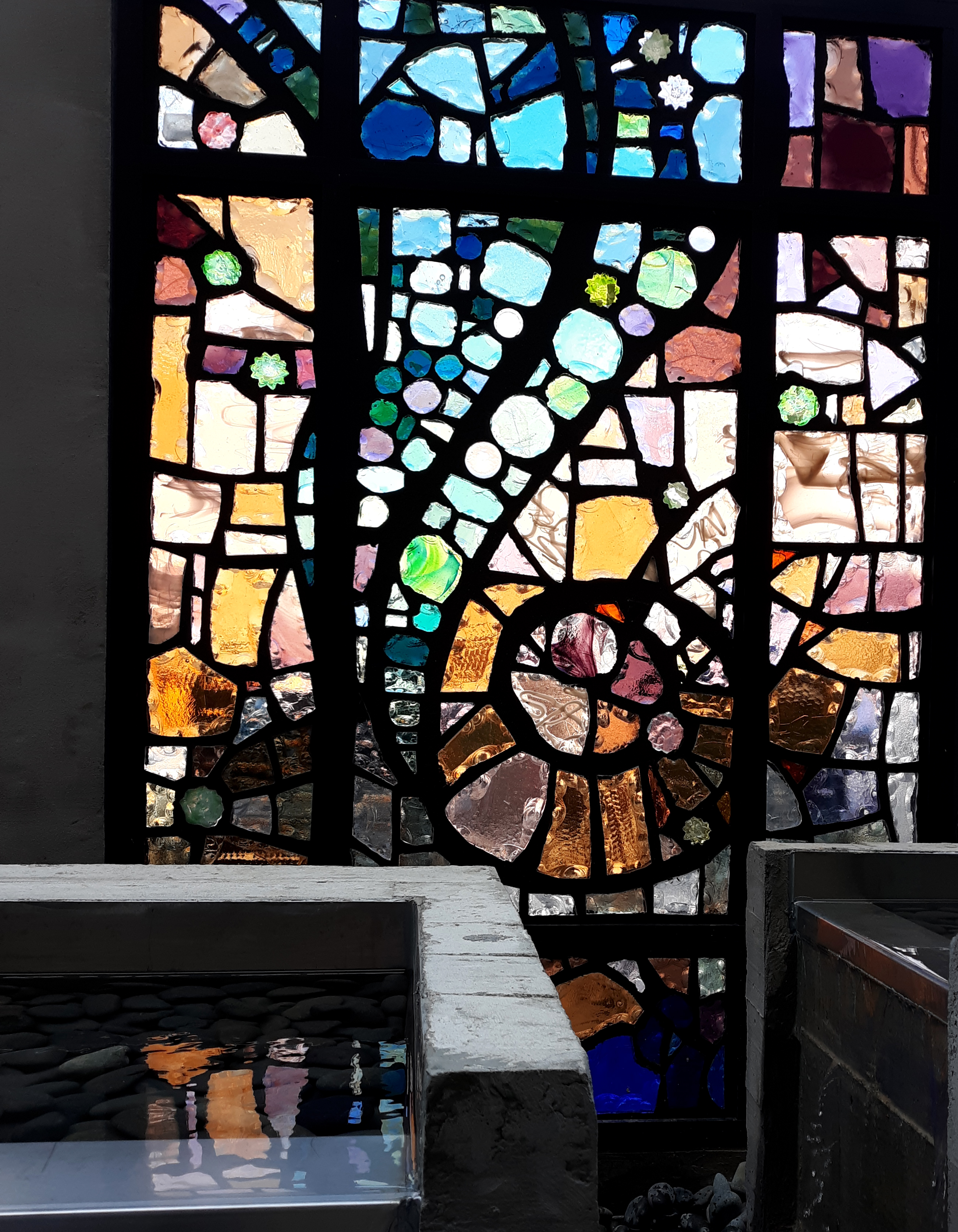
Sassafrasart.com

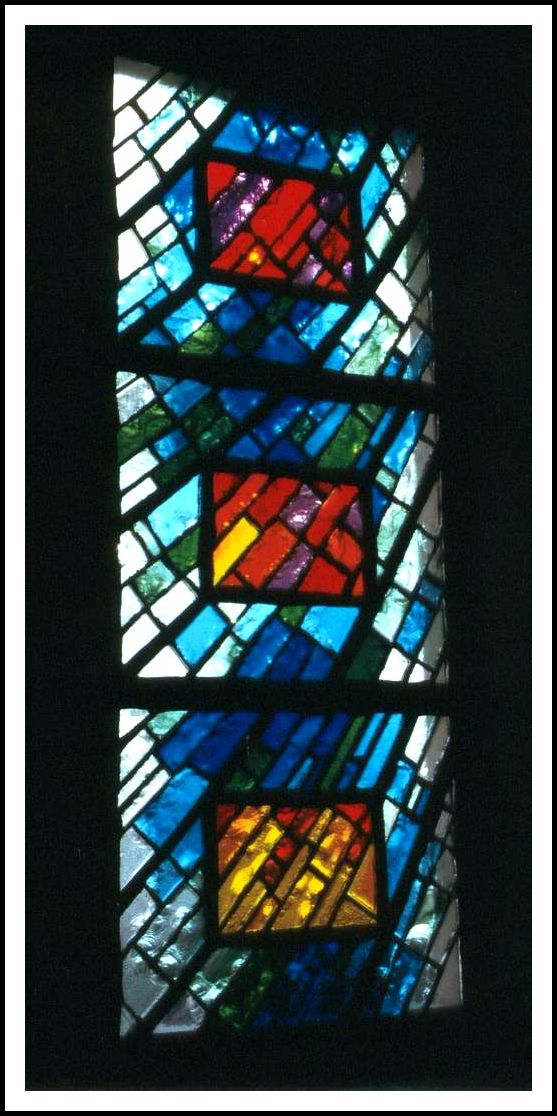
Dalle de verre by Carlo Roccella Studio

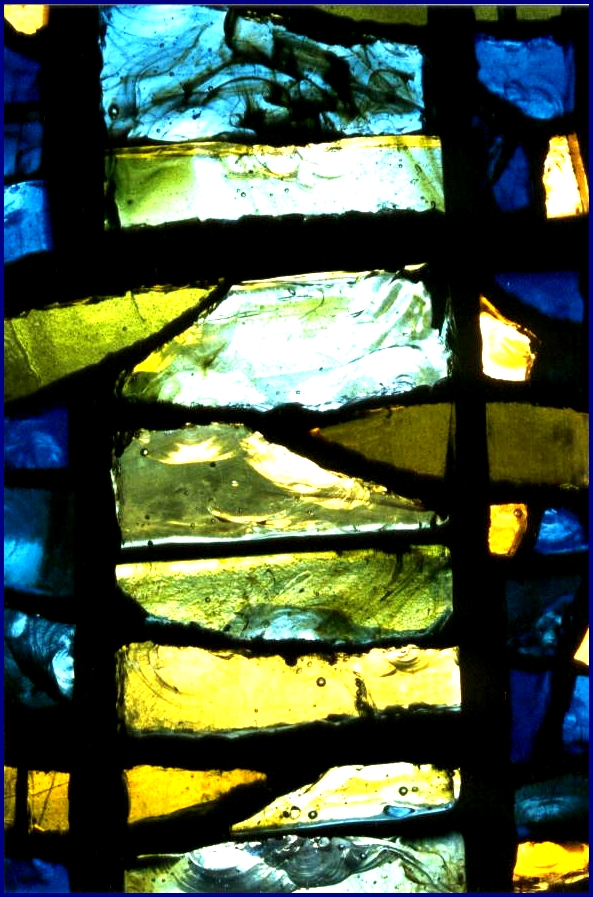
Dalle de verre by Carlo Roccella Studio

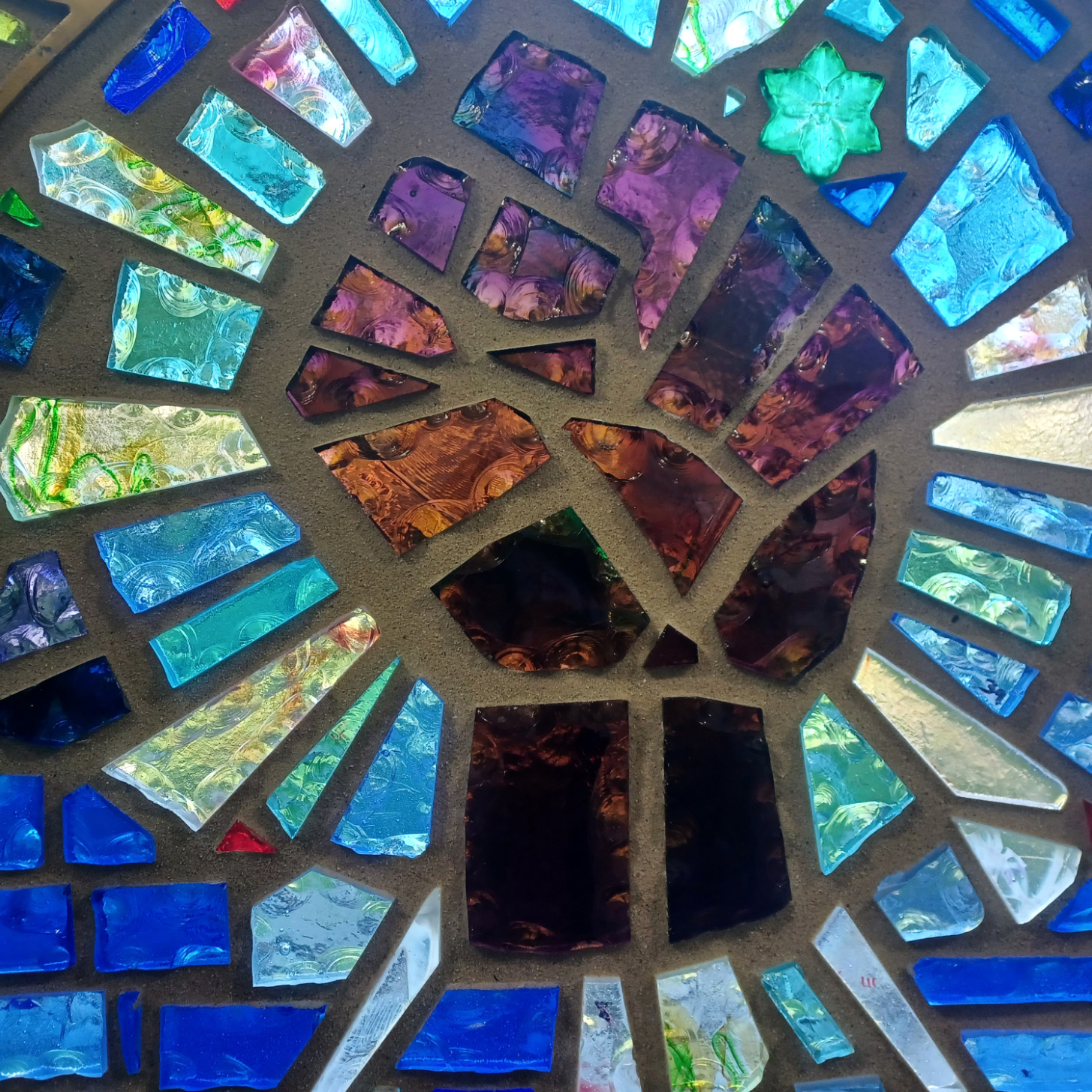
Civil Rights Memorial in Memphis TN www.sassafrasart.com

== Conservation ==
Originally, concrete was used as a matrix, which means that older pieces will be structurally unsound and require renovation. Today, modern technology has created appropriate solutions: an epoxy resin was created with the same expansion rate as the glass. This resin is now used as a matrix instead of concrete. This has solved all structural issues.

== Dalle de verre in the UK ==
Dalle de verre was brought to the UK by Pierre Fourmaintraux who joined James Powell and Sons (later Whitefriars Glass Studio) in 1956 and trained Dom Charles Norris in the technique. Norris was a Benedictine monk of Buckfast Abbey who went on to become arguably the most prolific British proponent of dalle de verre. His work is incorporated in several Modernist listed Catholic churches.

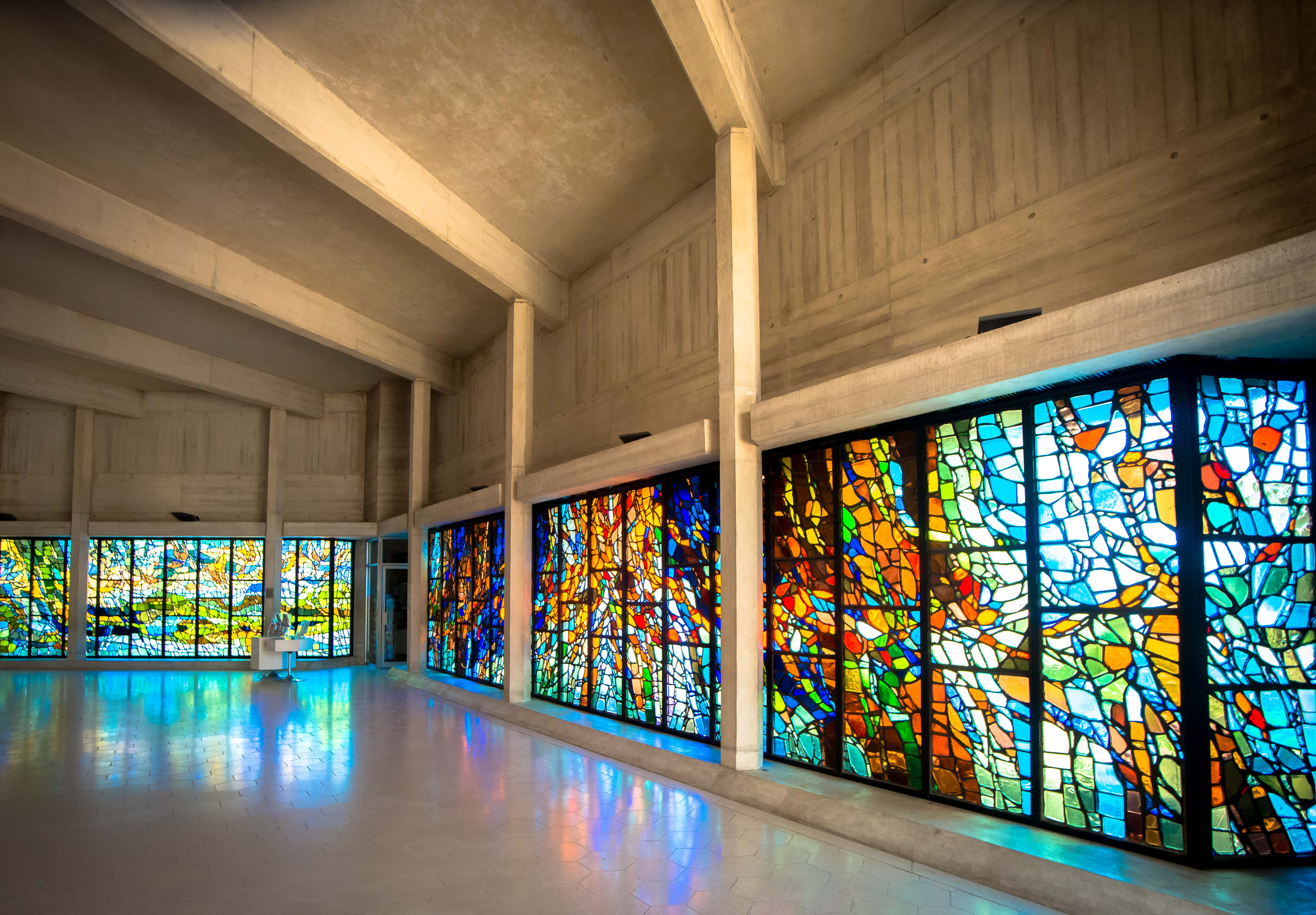
Narthex stained glass by Henry Haig ('Pentecost' to right, 'Jubilation' ahead), Clifton Cathedral, Bristol

Other notable dalle de verre artists who have worked in the UK include Gabriel Loire, John Baker and Henry Haig. The latter designed the narthex windows at Clifton Cathedral.

== See also ==
- List of art techniques
