= List of works by George Pace =

George Pace (1915–75) was an English architect who specialised in ecclesiastical work. He was trained in London, during which time he won prizes for his designs. From 1941 to 1949 he served in the army, and was then appointed as surveyor to the diocese of Sheffield. Similar appointments to other cathedrals followed. Pace's works included restoring, repairing and making additions to existing churches, designing fittings and furniture for churches, and designing new churches. His style was essentially Modernist, but he had respect for traditional styles, sometimes combining elements from both in his designs.

This list includes Pace's major works, ecclesiastical and non-ecclesiastical. All his work on listed buildings is included in the list, but otherwise it is incomplete.

== Key ==
| Grade | Criteria |
|---|---|
| Grade I | Buildings of exceptional interest, sometimes considered to be internationally important. |
| Grade II* | Particularly important buildings of more than special interest. |
| Grade II | Buildings of national importance and special interest. |
"—" denotes a work that is not graded.

== New buildings ==
| Name | Location | Photograph | Date | Notes | Grade |
|---|---|---|---|---|---|
| Christ Church | Orpington, Bromley, Greater London; 51.3643°N 0.1073°E | | 1939 | Pace's first church, designed in the year of his qualification as an architect. | — |
| Church of St Mark | Broomhill, Sheffield, South Yorkshire; 53.3775°N 1.4952°W | | 1955–67 | The church had been built in 1868–71 in Gothic Revival style, and was damaged during the Second World War. Pace first restored the spire and porch in the original style, then in 1961–63 rebuilt the rest of the church is Modernist style. He also designed most of the internal fittings, which he continued to do until 1967. The body of the church is built in reinforced concrete, with stone cladding externally, and brick covering internally. | II |
| Chapel, St. Michael's College | Llandaff, Cardiff, Wales; 51.4924°N 3.2186°W | | 1957–59 | Built to replace a chapel damaged in the Second World War, it is in Modernist style. Built in stone with a slate roof, it has an uneven four-sided plan. There are many small rectangular windows, apparently arranged at random. Most of the internal fittings are also by Pace. | I |
| Chapel, Scargill House | Wharfedale, North Yorkshire; 54.1354°N 2.0352°W | | 1958–61 | A chapel for a religious centre, built in limestone with a roof shingled in red cedar. It has a rectangular plan, with aisles and a serpentine link to the house. The roof is steeply pitched. The gables contain mullioned and transomed windows of varying sizes, rising to the apex of the gable. | II* |
| Church of the Holy Redeemer | Acomb, York, North Yorkshire; 53.9661°N 1.1246°W | | 1959–65 | The first parish church to be built in York after the Second World War, it re-uses material from the demolished St Mary, Bishophill Senior. The re-used material includes a doorway and arches dating from the late 12th century. The rest of the church is in brick, with a slate roof. Projecting from the church are a chapel and a tower with a saddleback roof. | II |
| St Mark's Church | Chadderton, Oldham, Greater Manchester; 53.5469°N 2.1387°W | | 1961–63] | St Mark's is built in blue engineering brick with concrete dressings and slate roofs. The body of the church has a canted north wall to accommodate the choir. At the west end is a chapel, and a tower with a steep saddleback roof. Most of the furnishings are also by Pace. He was hired to build the new parish building by Reverend Jack Strong after the previous temporary building exceeded the expected time of use and was in a bad condition | II |
| William Temple Memorial Church | Wythenshawe, Greater Manchester; 53.3777°N 2.2641°W | | 1963–65 | A church is Modernist style, built on a steel frame, with some reinforced concrete, walls of blue, red and brown brick, and a copper roof. It is oblong in plan, with slit windows, dormers on the roof, and a slim tower. The interior is organised on the diagonal, with the altar on one corner, a chapel in the opposite corner, and the font in the centre. The re-used pews are set in a semicircle. All the fittings are by Pace. | II |
| Chapel | Keele University, Staffordshire; 53.0023°N 2.2722°W | | 1964–65 | A multi-denominational chapel built in blue engineering bricks with a slate roof. It has a rectangular plan with two protruding circular chapels. There is a small copper spirelet on each chapel, and two dormers on the main roof. On the sides are mullioned strip windows in varying sizes and at varying heights. The interior is arranged for flexible use, with a hydraulic screen that can be lowered to create separate spaces. | II |
| St Saviour's Church | Fairweather Green, Bradford, West Yorkshire; 53.7985°N 1.7992°W | | 1966 | A church built in concrete on a steel frame, with brick cladding and slate roofs. Pace added a church hall to the west end in 1971. The church has a rectangular plan, with a bell tower to the east incorporated into the roof, vestries to the north-west, and a chapel to the west. Inside there is no division between the nave and the chancel. | II |
| Church of the Ascension | Woolston, Warrington; 53.401174°N 2.532389°W | | 1970 | Designed in collaboration with Ron Sims and built upon land donated in 1917 by local philanthropist Edward Gorton, the Modernist design features an asymmetrical pitched roof and a semi-detached bell tower. The materials used are yellowish brick, reinforced concrete and powder-coated steel. As originally built, the church had a Broderick patent copper roof but unfortunately due to repeated vandalism and water ingress this was replaced in 1988 with the tiled roof which we see today. The interior, designed as a cohesive whole, is intact. | — |
| St James the Deacon's Church, Acomb Moor | Acomb, North Yorkshire | | 1971 | A Modernist design with an asymmetrical pitched roof, and a side chapel with a monopitch roof and a bell tower. | — |
| Addleshaw Tower | Chester, Cheshire; 53.19157°N 2.88939°W | | 1973–75 | Built for Chester Cathedral, this is the first free-standing bell tower to be built by an English cathedral since the 15th century. It is built on a reinforced concrete frame, with a sandstone base and is hung with Bethesda slates. The tower contains a ring of twelve bells, and is the headquarters of the Chester Diocesan Guild of Church Bell Ringers. | II |

== Additions, alterations and restorations ==
| Name | Location | Photograph | Date | Notes | Grade |
|---|---|---|---|---|---|
| Llandaff Cathedral | Llandaff, Cardiff, Wales; 51.4957°N 3.2179°W | | 1949–60 | As consulting architect, he reconstructed the cathedral following damage by a landmine in 1941. This included restoring the spire to its original height and adding a parabolic arch between the nave and the choir, which supports the statue of Christ by Jacob Epstein. | I |
| All Saints Church | Adlingfleet, East Yorkshire; 53.6787°N 0.7238°W | | 1955–57 | The church dates from the 13th century. Pace's restoration included re-roofing the church, and repairing the tower, the south aisle, and the windows. | I |
| St Leonard's Church | Middleton, Greater Manchester; 53.5532°N 2.1946°W | | 1957–60 | The church dates from the 13th century. Pace added a new north porch and vestries, installed light fittings, and designed a memorial to the First World War. | I |
| St Michael's Church | Bramhall, Greater Manchester; 53.3633°N 2.1642°W | | 1960–63 | Pace added a west tower to a church built in 1909–10. It is large, square, and built in brick. The tower has splayed corners, and very large windows on three sides, each with four transoms. At ground level are rows of lancet windows. The church was listed in 2024. | II |
| Sheffield Cathedral | Sheffield, South Yorkshire; 53.3831°N 1.4694°W | | 1960–66 | The oldest material in the church dates from the 15th century. Originally a parish church it became a cathedral in 1914. Pace added a narthex, and a link, and rebuilt the west end of the cathedral. | I |
| St Mary's Church | Windermere, Cumbria; 54.3809°N 2.9103°W | | 1961 | The church was built in 1848, and remodelled in 1881–82. Pace added a northeast vestry. This has a semicircular apse and a flat roof. | II |
| Church of St Martin le Grand | York, North Yorkshire; 53.9593°N 1.0845°W | | 1961–68 | The church was mainly destroyed by bombing in 1942. It was remodelled and rebuilt by Pace. | II* |
| St. Mary's Church | Hitchin, Hertfordshire; 51.9897°N 0.1897°W | | 1962 | The oldest fabric in the church dates from the 13th century. Pace carried out a restoration. | I |
| Christ Church | Bridlington, East Yorkshire; 54.0847°N 0.1932°W | | 1962–63 | The church was built in 1840–41 and designed by George Gilbert Scott and Moffatt. Pace redesigned the interior, introducing new vaulting. | II |
| Christ Church | Fulwood, Sheffield, South Yorkshire; 53.3652°N 1.5424°W | | c. 1963 | The church had been built in 1837–39. Pace added the north aisle. | II |
| All Saints Church | Ecclesall, Sheffield, South Yorkshire; 53.3568°N 1.5121°W | | 1964 | Reordered the church, which dates from 1789. This included a new roof over the nave, which is supported by steel columns. | II |
| St Augustine's Church | Edgbaston, Birmingham, West Midlands; 52.4734°N 1.9459°W | | 1964 | The church was built in 1868, and designed by J. A. Chatwin. Chatwin added a steeple in 1876. Pace created a baptistry in the north transept, and also designed the font. | II* |
| St Margaret's Church | Leeds, West Yorkshire; 53.8100°N 1.5743°W | | 1964 | The church was built in 1908–09 and designed by Temple Moore, but it was not completed. Pace completed the west end, but not the planned tower. The church is now redundant, and is used as an arts and events venue. | II* |
| All Saints' Church | Upper Poppleton, York, North Yorkshire; 53.9795°N 1.1545°W | | c. 1964 | The church was built in 1891 to replace a Norman chapel. Pace added a link from the vestry to the church hall, and later designed the choir stalls, altar rail and altar. | II |
| Chester Cathedral | Chester, Cheshire; 53.1919°N 2.8905°W | | 1964–66 | Pace designed stalls for the nave, although most of these have been moved. In 1969 he redecorated the organ, and in 1973 was responsible for decorating the ceiling of the crossing. | I |
| St Mary's Church | Clifton, Nottingham; 52.9080°N 1.1969°W | | 1965–75 | St Mary's dates mainly from the 14th century, and includes fabric from the 12th and 13th centuries. Pace carried out restorations. | I |
| All Saints Church | Pontefract, West Yorkshire; 53.6961°N 1.3009°W | | 1966–67 | The church was built in the 14th and 15th centuries, but severely damaged in the Civil War. It remained in ruins until it was largely rebuilt in 1831 by R. D. Chantrell. Pace added a new nave and vestry within the old ruins, incorporating medieval fabric in the form of carved heads. | II* |
| Stone Tower | Claverdon, Warwickshire; 52.2850°N 1.6983°W | | 1967 | A tower house built in about 1593. Pace added a wing to the northeast, incorporating former outbuidings. | II |
| King George VI Memorial Chapel | St George's Chapel, Windsor Castle, Berkshire; 51.4836°N 0.6069°W | | 1967–69 | Pace added the chapel in the north aisle of the nave. This led to his being appointed as a Commander of the Royal Victorian Order (CVO) in 1971. | I |
| St Mary's Church | Deane, Bolton, Greater Manchester; 53.5689°N 2.4645°W | | 1969–76 | The church dates from the 16th century. Pace created a northeast chapel under the organ, and designed one of its stained glass windows. | II* |
| St Wilfrid's Church | Standish, Wigan, Greater Manchester; 53.5872°N 2.6614°W | | 1971 | The church originated in the 16th century. Pace reordered the chancel, and designed the organ case. He had previously reordered the south (Standish) chapel during the 1960s. | I |
| St Mary, Castlegate | York, North Yorkshire; 53.9572°N 1.0804°W | | 1974–75 | The church dates from the 15th century, but became redundant in 1958. It was converted into an exhibition centre by Pace and Ronald Sims. | I |
| St Mary's Church | Kirk Bramwith, Doncaster, South Yorkshire; 53.5984°N 1.0647°W | | Undated | The church dates mainly from the 14th and 15th centuries, and includes a 12th-century doorway. Pace replaced the nave roof, which includes the arms of the Duchy of Lancaster. | II* |

== Fittings and furniture ==
| Name | Location | Photograph | Date | Notes |
|---|---|---|---|---|
| Church of St Peter and St Paul | Wem, Shropshire; 52.8550°N 2.7257°W | | 1957 | Designed the lectern and the light fittings. |
| Church of St Peter and St Paul | Ormskirk, Lancashire; 53.5693°N 2.8877°W | | 1973 | Added a cover to a font of 1661. Pace also designed the wooden chandeliers. |
| St Albans Cathedral | St Albans, Hertfordshire; 51.9897°N 0.1897°W | | 1973 | Designed the movable stalls for the nave. These were later donated to St George's Cathedral, Southwark. |
| St Bartholomew's Church | Wilmslow, Cheshire; 53.3301°N 2.2296°W | | Undated | Designed the reredos. |
| Ely Cathedral | Ely, Cambridgeshire 52°23′55″N 0°15′51″E | The Octagon at Ely Cathedral | | Octagon altar, platform, clergy seating and stalls. |
