= Liturgical Movement =

19th- and 20th-century Christian movement

The Liturgical Movement was a 19th- and 20th-century movement of scholarship for the reform of Christian worship. It began in the Catholic Church and spread to many other Christian churches including the Anglican Communion, Lutheran and some other Protestant churches. Its aims included promoting informed lay participation, reordering church architecture, recovering elements of early Christian liturgy, and clarifying the structure and language of worship. The movement significantly influenced liturgical reforms across these traditions, most notably those adopted by the Catholic Church at the Second Vatican Council.

== History ==
=== Developments in Germany ===
At almost the same time, in Germany Abbot Ildefons Herwegen of Maria Laach convened a liturgical conference in Holy Week, 1914, for lay people. Herwegen thereafter promoted research which resulted in a series of publications for clergy and lay people during and after World War I. One of the foremost German scholars was Odo Casel. Having begun by studying the Middle Ages, Casel looked at the origins of Christian liturgy in pagan cultic acts, understanding liturgy as a profound universal human act as well as a religious one. In his Ecclesia Orans (The Praying Church) (1918), Casel studied and interpreted the pagan mysteries of ancient Greece and Rome, discussing similarities and differences between them and the Christian mysteries. His conclusions were studied in various places, notably at Klosterneuburg in Austria, where the Augustinian canon Pius Parsch applied the principles in his church of St. Gertrude, which he took over in 1919. With laymen he worked out the relevance of the Bible to liturgy. Similar experiments were to take place in Leipzig during the Second World War.

== Effect on church architecture ==
The Liturgical movement was influential in church design in France, Belgium, Germany, Switzerland and the United Kingdom, where it was introduced in the 1950s. The New Churches Research Group was founded in 1957 in the UK to promote "a modern idiom appropriate to the ideas of the Liturgical Movement". The NCRG was a group of Catholic and Anglican church architects and craftspeople who promoted liturgical reform of churches though publications such as The Tablet and Architects' Journal. The group was co-founded by Peter Hammond, Robert Maguire and Keith Murray (an ecclesiastical designer), and included architects Peter Gilbey, John Newton (Burles, Newton & Partners), Patrick Nuttgens, George Pace, Patrick Reyntiens (stained glass artist), Austin Winkley, Lance Wright, as well as Catholic priest and theologian Charles Davis.

The Second Vatican Council saw the acceptance of many of the movement's ideas, resulting in a radical rethinking of design, expressing 'noble simplicity rather than sumptuous display'. The turning points were the publication of Peter Hammond's Liturgy and Architecture, a critique of modern English church design, and the publication of Frederick Gibberd's design for the completion of Liverpool Metropolitan Cathedral.

=== Reordering of churches ===
An example of re-ordering is St Joseph's church in Retford, which was designed by Ernest Bower Norris in modern Romanesque design, incorporating Art Deco elements. It opened in 1959 and in 1968 was re-ordered by Gerard Goalen to comply with the recommendations of Vatican II. During the re-order, Goalen commissioned a large Christus Rex for the sanctuary wall by Steven Sykes.

=== Building of new churches ===
The Catholic church became a major patron of modern architecture and art during the 1950s and 60s in the UK. A group of modernist architects including Gillespie, Kidd & Coia, Gerard Goalen, Francis Pollen, Desmond Williams and Austin Winkley utilised contemporary design and construction methods to deliver the 'noble simplicity' instructed by Vatican II, literally to express the values of the Liturgical Movement in buildings. Desmond Williams noted that his St Mary Dunstable church was "circular, with the object being to bring as many of the congregation near the altar, and proved very popular in attracting worshippers." Maguire & Murray's St Paul's, Bow Common (1960) has not only been awarded Grade II* listed status but was also voted best twentieth century church in the UK by the judges of the UK's Best Modern Churches competition (2013).

Architects in this movement also collaborated with notable ceramic and glass artists such as Dom Charles Norris, Patrick Reyntiens and Steven Sykes.

=== Status of Modernist churches ===
Some of the churches built during this period are now being listed by Historic England in recognition of their outstanding modernist architecture and art. These include Goalen's Our Lady of Fatima, Harlow (Grade II listed, 1958), St Mary Dunstable (Grade II listed, 1964), Winkley's Church of St Margaret of Scotland, Twickenham (Grade II listed, 1969).

=== Criticism ===
The architecture of these churches was criticized by the architect Robert Maguire; he stated: "Gerard Goalen's T-shaped church of Our Lady of Fatima at Harlow, resplendent with its Buckfast Abbey glass. My only serious criticism of this – and it is serious – is that God's Holy People are divided, like All Gaul, into three parts."

=== Return to traditional layouts ===
In the U.S., there has been a return to more traditional Catholic church layouts. This has included revisiting pre-Liturgical Movement architecture in new construction and the renovation of modernist churches along traditionalist lines. The traditional cruciform plan—which was largely absent from liturgical designs since Vatican II because of its fracturing effect on the assembly—has been incorporated into recent church buildings.

== Churches of the Lutheran tradition ==
The Evangelical Lutheran Church in America, the largest Lutheran body in the United States, has also revived a greater appreciation of the liturgy and its ancient origins. Its clergy and congregations have adopted many traditional liturgical symbols, such as the sign of the cross, incense, and the full chasuble, which have become more common than in years past. While some freedom in style is exercised by individual congregations, the overall style of the aspects of liturgical worship – including vestments, altar adornments, and a general return of many formal practices – has become closer to the styles of the Roman Catholic and Anglican traditions.

== Anglican Communion ==
By the 20th century, the Church of England had made quite radical ceremonial and ritual changes, most of them incorporating revival of medieval Christian practice.

The English Missal, published first in 1912, was a conflation of the Eucharistic rite in the 1662 prayer book and the Latin prayers of the Roman Missal, including the rubrics indicating the posture and manual acts. It was a recognition of practices which had been widespread for many years. The changes were the subject of controversy, opposition, hostility, and legal action.

The revision effort that produced the failed 1928 proposed prayer book was based on medieval models, owing little to the researches or practices of continental scholars. In the United States, William Palmer Ladd, who had visited a number of the European centers of Catholic scholarship and reform, introduced many of the ideas of the movement at the Berkeley Divinity School in New Haven. Ladd wrote a series of magazine columns (published as a book after his death titled Prayer Book Interleaves) that introduced much of the newer agenda to the Episcopal Church. While this American version of the movement had broad church roots, in England it was a new generation of scholars and clergy associated with the Catholic revival who led the next phase of discussion. With the publication in 1935 of Gabriel Hebert's Liturgy and Society, a debate in England began about the relationship between worship and the world as well as about the importance of eucharistic celebration and participation. Hebert, a Kelham Father, interpreted the liturgy on wider social principles, rejecting, for example the idea of the eucharistic fast as being impractical. Its members wished for more frequent communion, not merely attendance at Mass; they wanted to relate the eucharist to the world of ordinary life. Through its influence, the offertory was restored, though not without protracted controversy.

== Influence and criticisms ==
Horton M. Davies, a professor at Princeton University, wrote: "What is fascinating about (the liturgical) movement is that it has enabled Protestant churches to recover in part the Catholic liturgical heritage, while the Catholics seem to have appropriated the Protestant valuation of preaching, of shared worship in the vernacular tongue, and the importance of laity as the people of God."

== See also ==
=== Individuals ===
- Louis Bouyer
- Annibale Bugnini
- Charles Davis
- Gregory Dix
- Donald L. Garfield
- Gerard Goalen
- Romano Guardini
- Peter Hammond
- Marion J. Hatchett
- Gabriel Hebert
- Friedrich Heiler
- Reynold Henry Hillenbrand
- Josef Andreas Jungmann
- William Palmer Ladd
- Robert Maguire
- Christine Mohrmann
- Patrick Nuttgens
- George Pace
- Francis Pollen
- H. A. Reinhold
- Patrick Reyntiens
- Clarence Rufus J. Rivers
- Gunnar Rosendal
- Hermann Sasse
- Alexander Schmemann
- Max Thurian
- Virgil Michel
- Desmond Williams
- Austin Winkley

=== Concepts and movements ===
- Lex orandi, lex credendi
- Sacrosanctum Concilium
- Berneuchen Movement
- Kirchliche Arbeit Alpirsbach
