= Robert Maguire (architect) =

British architect (1931–2019)

- Born: 6 June 1931; Paddington, London, England
- Died: 8 February 2019 (aged 87)
- Occupation: Architect
- Spouses: Robina Lake (m. 1955; div. 1978) Alison Williams (m. 1982)
- Writing career
- Period: 1957–2000
- Notable work: St Paul's, Bow Common

Robert Alfred Maguire (1931–2019) was an influential British modernist architect and leading thinker in the British liturgical architectural movement of the Church of England. Maguire's St Paul's Church at Bow Common was voted the best church of the 20th century in the United Kingdom.

== Early and personal life ==
Robert (Bob) Maguire was born in Paddington, London, on 6 June 1931. He was the son of Arthur Maguire, a furniture maker and his wife Rose (née Fountain), a shop worker.

He attended Droop Street Board School and won an LCC scholarship to attend Bancroft's School, Woodford Green. There he learnt woodwork from a Bauhaus-oriented master, and built on the woodworking skills learnt from his father.

At the age of 16, Maguire began working for the church architect Laurence King, who recommended he attend the Architectural Association School of Architecture. Maguire was able to do so by winning a Leverhulme scholarship. While studying at the AA he was awarded the Howard Colls Travelling Studentship for his first-year portfolio.

In 1955, Maguire married Robina Lake with whom he had four daughters (Susan, Rebecca, Joanna and Martha). They divorced in 1978. In 1982, he married Alison Williams with whom he shared two stepsons (Edward and Matthew).

== Architectural career ==
=== St Paul's, Bow Common and the NCRG ===
After graduating from the AA, Maguire worked as the buildings editor for Architects' Journal for four years, as well as contributing to Architectural Review. During this time, the editor of the Architects' Journal – Colin Boyne – commissioned him to build a house for his family.

At the age of 25, he designed one of his most celebrated buildings – St Paul's, Bow Common – which was completed in 1960 in conjunction with the designer Keith Murray. This was based on a student project that his tutors nearly failed because of its brutalist, concrete nature. It was an initial example of the type of liturgically reformed church championed by the Anglican architectural thinker Peter Hammond. In contrast to the brutalist architecture, Murray designed mosaics that were executed by Charles Lutyens.

Hammond was an Anglican priest and writer on ecclesiastical architecture. He included Maguire's church in his influential 1960 book Liturgy and Architecture. This led to Hammond, Maguire and Murray founding the New Churches Research Group (NCRG) of church architects and craftspeople which promoted liturgical reform of churches through publications such as The Tablet and Architects' Journal. The group also included architects Peter Gilbey, John Newton (Burles, Newton & Partners), Patrick Nuttgens, George Pace, Patrick Reyntiens (stained glass artist), Austin Winkley, Lance Wright, as well as Catholic priest and theologian Charles Davis.

=== Practice with Keith Murray ===
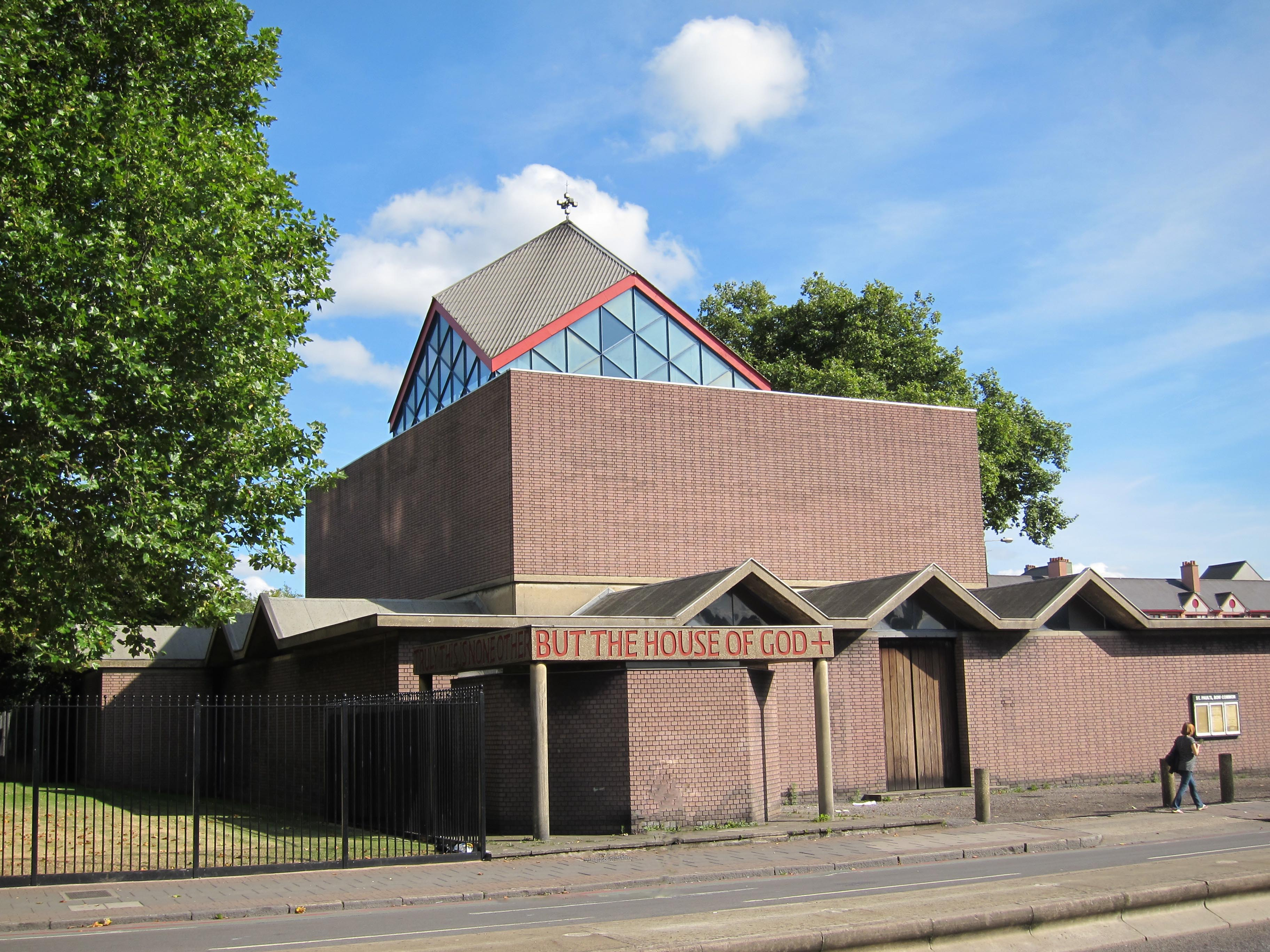
St Paul's, Bow Common, exterior

Maguire and Murray formed an architectural practice in 1959 (Maguire & Murray). Their practice designed a number of important modernist churches including:

- St Paul's, Bow Common (1960) – a Grade II* listed building This church was also voted best 20th-century church in the United Kingdom by the judges of the UK's Best Modern Churches competition (2013).
- St Matthew's Perry Beeches, Birmingham (1963) – a Grade II listed building
- The church at Malling Abbey, West Malling, Kent (1966) – a Grade II* listed building
- All Saints', Crewe (1967)
- St Joseph the Worker, Northolt (1970)

=== Families by Choice ===
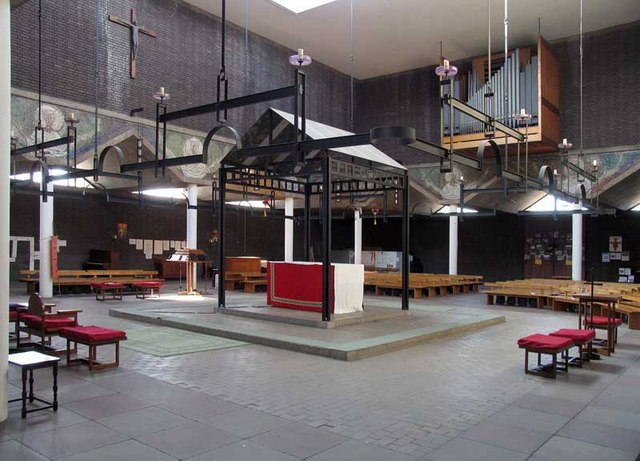
St Paul's, Bow Common, The interior

Maguire had been introduced to a charismatic teacher of existential psychotherapy, Catherine Ginsberg, through his friend Joseph Rykwert. Ginsberg founded a community in West London which Murray and Maguire (and their then wives and families) joined. Later the community moved to four Victorian villas in Kew. The living arrangements comprised flats that shared a kitchen with one or two others.

This experience influenced how Maguire & Murray approached the design of student accommodation, which emphasised the concept of a large house sharing communal living and dining rooms. Student accommodation designed by Maguire & Murray includes Trinity College, Oxford (now demolished), housing for Lutheran students at King's Cross, London, and award-winning student accommodation for the University of Surrey.

== Later work ==
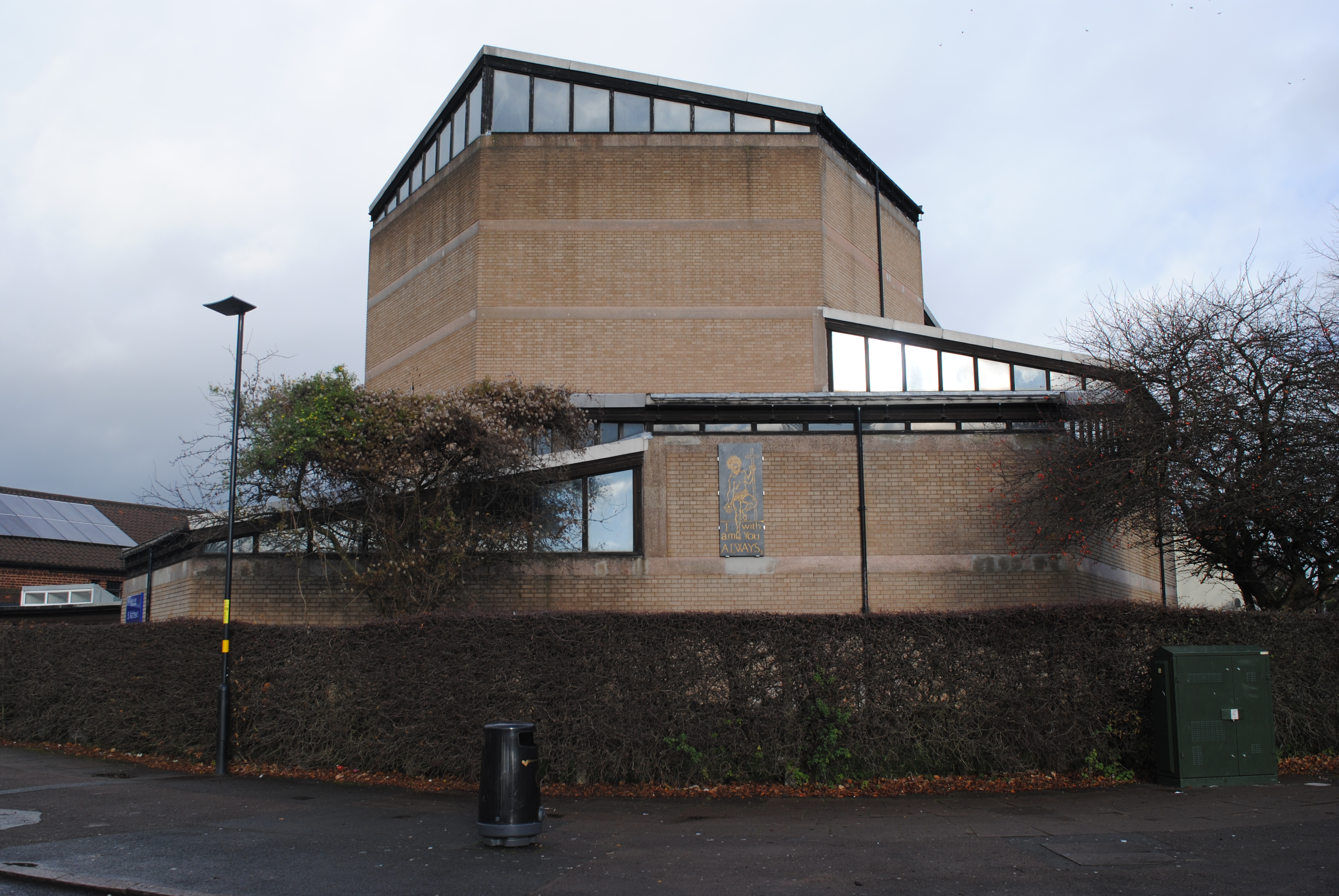
St Matthew's, Perry Beeches, exterior

Between 1976 and 1985, Maguire was head of the School of Architecture at Oxford Polytechnic (later Oxford Brookes University). One of the areas that Maguire’s department focused on was environmentally responsive architecture that developed modern design enriched by local traditions.

By this time much of the architectural practice's work lay in conservation, reordering churches and making alterations to Oxford colleges. In 1988, he decided to establish an independent practice – separate to Murray – in Thame, Oxfordshire.

Highlights from this phase of his career are Worcester College, Oxford (1988–90), Radley College, Abingdon (1995–96 and 97–98) and the theatre, art gallery and sports hall at Dormston Comprehensive School, Sedgley (1997–2000).

== Later life and death ==
In the 21st century, Maguire retired from practice and designed Hopewater House in Ettrickbridge, in the Scottish Borders. He called this a "three-generation" house: a double house for him and his wife, plus an apartment for his stepson and young family, facing onto a shared courtyard. He also continued to produce abstract sculptures, some of which were exhibited at the Open Eye Gallery in Edinburgh.

Maguire died on 8 February 2019 from a combination of metastatic prostate cancer, ischaemic heart disease, and congestive cardiac failure.

== Publications ==
- Adler, Gerald; Maguire, Robert; Murray, Keith (2012). Robert Maguire and Keith Murray-Twentieth Century Architects. London: RIBA Publishing. ISBN 978-185946-165-5.
