= Peter Hammond (priest) =

British priest, writer and artist

- Born: 24 February 1921; Bromley, Kent, England
- Died: 1 March 1999 (aged 78); Lincoln, England
- Occupations: priest, writer, artist
- Writing career
- Period: 1957-1999

Peter Hammond (1921–1999) was a priest, writer, teacher and artist best known for his writings on church architecture and his significant influence on the modernising of church architecture as part of the Liturgical Movement.

== Early life ==
Hammond was born in Bromley, UK on 24 February 1921. He went to art college in 1938, gaining a scholarship to the Royal College of Art. With the outbreak of World War II, he joined the Royal Navy as a radio operative on the North Atlantic convoys and later in 1943 he was posted to Sicily and then to Alexandria. In 1946, Hammond was able to accept a place at Merton College, Oxford reading history. While at Merton he won a scholarship to conduct research in an Orthodox Christian country and the result of this research was his book The Waters of Marah.

== Religious life ==
Hammond was ordained in Oxford in 1951 and became the curate of Summertown in Oxford, eventually becoming the vicar of Bagendon. He was the general secretary of the Anglican and Eastern Church Association and in 1957 co-founded the New Churches Research Group.

=== Influence on Church architecture ===
Robert Proctor emphasises the influence that Hammond had on the modernisation of churches in the UK. The New Churches Research Group (NCRG), which he co-founded, was a group of Catholic and Anglican church architects and craftspeople who promoted liturgical reform of churches through publications such as The Tablet and Architects' Journal. The group included architects Peter Gilbey, Robert Maguire, Keith Murray (an ecclesiastical designer), John Newton (Burles, Newton & Partners), Patrick Nuttgens, George Pace, Patrick Reyntiens (stained glass artist), Austin Winkley, Lance Wright, as well as Catholic priest and theologian Charles Davis.

In 1960, Hammond wrote what has come to be regarded as his seminal work – Liturgy and Architecture. In this he argued that the post-war period was the most active and experimental period in ecclesiastical architecture since the sixteenth century. Openly and eloquently critical of Basil Spence's Coventry Cathedral, what was needed, he said, were 'functional structures designed to serve and articulate the communal activities which provide the one valid reason for building churches at all'. Good churches, he said, ‘no less than good schools and good hospitals – can be designed only through a radically functional approach.’

Liturgy and Architecture was widely read both in the UK and internationally and was one of the main spurs to the modernist and liturgical movement in church architecture in the UK. The book was given to Breuer and Associates, for example, by their Benedictine patrons during the design phase for Saint John’s Abbey church. Soon after, in 1961, 'Church Building Today' was founded, a magazine edited by two of the central figures in the NCRG - the architects Robert Macguire and Keith Murray. Then, in 1962, Hammond planned, edited and published a series of studies in ‘Towards a Church Architecture’. These publications established Hammond as “the Church of England’s leading architectural theorist”, according to the art historian Tanya Harrod.

== Later and personal life ==
Between 1962 and 1980, Hammond taught art, music and literature at Hull School of Art and Design. In 1980, he returned to Greece and studied the monastery of Amorgos, with the intention of writing a book. This book remained unfinished and unpublished at his death. Hammond was married to Gillian Fansler (later divorced) and had three sons. He spent his later years in Lincoln where he was made a canon in 1987 and took an active interest in the cathedral, bringing together 40 international conservators and art historians to help decide how best to preserve the west front. He died on 1 March 1999 at the age of 78.

== Bibliography ==
- The waters of Marah: The present state of the Greek Church. (Rockliff, 1956)
- Lossky. V., The Mystical Theology Of The Eastern Church. Ed/trans Hammond P., Allchin A.M., Lampert E. (New York: St Vladimir’s Seminary Press, 1991)
- Liturgy And Architecture (Barrie and Rockliff, 1960)
- Towards A Church Architecture. Ed. Hammond P.
