= Alcuin Deutsch =

American abbot (1877–1951)

Alcuin Henry Deutsch (February 13, 1877 – May 12, 1951) was an abbot of St. John's Abbey in Collegeville, Minnesota.

== Biography ==
He was born to German parents in Valla, then Hungary, an area which has historically been variously part of Austria or Hungary. He emigrated to Minnesota with his parents when he was four. After graduating high school, he became a novice at St. John's and made first profession in 1897; his monastic name patron was the scholar and liturgist Alcuin of York. He studied at St. Anselm's in Rome. After ordination, he taught at college and seminary in St. John's Abbey, advancing to the position of seminary rector.

He was made prior of the abbey in 1917 and then elected abbot in 1921. His motto was taken from Martin of Tours: Non recuso laborem ("I do not refuse the work"). Many projects of expansion and new foundations followed. St. John's Abbey became an interracial monastery in 1941, and the university of which he was president had black resident students since the early 1920s. For the twelve years from 1932 to 1944, he served the American-Cassinese Congregation as its president. He encouraged the restoration of the monastic liturgy and sacred Gregorian chant; as a scholarly reference for liturgy, he founded the periodical Orate Fratres and commissioned Virgil Michel to study in Louvain beginning in 1924 and to study the Liturgical Movement in Belgium and establish relations with its leaders. The Liturgical Press was founded in 1926. It also published a journal similar to Orate Fratres for nuns, it was called Sponsa Regis. Deutsch devoted time and attention to the secular oblates, as well. For them, he composed a Manual for Oblates in 1937 and founded a monthly bulletin called The Oblate. He encouraged and sponsored the publication of a Short Breviary for lay brothers and oblates.

Abbot Alcuin received the papal privilege of wearing the cappa magna in 1923. In 1943, the Vatican granted him the use of the purple biretta and skull cap; he seldom used them. From 1947 on, Abbot Alcuin struggled with poor health, brought on by over-work. His obituary in Orate Fratres notes that "He died on the Vigil of Pentecost, having made his weekly confession a few hours earlier." Since his namesake, Alcuin of York, had died on Pentecost, the date was significant.

During the twenty-nine years of his abbatiate, the number of monks at St. John's Abbey increased steadily. When he died, it was the largest Benedictine community in the world. Baldwin Dworschak was his successor.

== Missionary initiatives ==
During his service, St. John's founded missions in Mexico and Puerto Rico. Also, the Abbey has served all the Catholic parishes in the Bahamas and the Vicars Apostolic of that territory were monks sent there by Abbot Alcuin. Several monks from Collegeville were sent to fledgling abbey in various parts of the United States: Mark Braun led St. Gregory's Abbey in Shawnee, Oklahoma; Cuthbert Goeb went to Assumption Abbey in North Dakota; Severin Gertken took charge of Muenster Abbey in Saskatchewan, as did Michael Ott before him. He launched an interracial monastery in Kentucky during times of segregation. Monks were even sent from Minnesota to Japan.
