= Alcuin (disambiguation) =

Alcuin was a Carolingian court scholar from York.

Alcuin may also refer to:

- Alcuin Club, an Anglican organization
- Alcuin College, York, a college of the University of York
- Alcuin School, an independent school in Dallas, Texas
- Alcuin's sequence, a mathematical sequence of coefficients
- Alcuin Society, a non-profit organization founded for the book arts
- Alcuin Deutsch (1877–1951), abbot of Saint John's Abbey, Minnesota
- Alcuin Schulten (born 1972), Dutch former figure skater

== See also ==
- Alduin (disambiguation)
