= Desmond Williams (architect) =

British church architect (1932–2026)

Desmond Williams OBE
- Born: Desmond James Williams; 7 July 1932; Whalley Range, Manchester, England
- Died: 31 January 2026 (aged 93)
- Citizenship: British
- Occupation: Ecclesiastical architect
- Children: Andy Williams, Jez Williams
- Writing career
- Subject: Liturgical Movement
- Notable awards: OBE in 1988

Desmond James Williams OBE (7 July 1932 – 31 January 2026) was a British architect who specialised in church architecture and was influenced by the Liturgical Movement. He was one of the most important architects of the Catholic Modernist movement in the United Kingdom.

== Background ==
Desmond James Williams was born in Whalley Range, Manchester, on 7 July 1932, the son of submarine electrical draughtsman Sydney Williams and Eleanor, a "staunch Catholic", and was educated at Xaverian Grammar School and the University of Manchester School of Architecture. His was married twice: first to Felicity McDonnell, and later to Susan Richardson. He had four children: Andy and Jez (twins, who are members of the band Doves) and Dominic and Sarah (who both became architects). Dominic is a director of his father's old firm Ellis Williams Architects, and Sarah ran the London office of AEDAS before starting her own practice Sarah Williams Architects in 2013. Desmond Williams's other interests were aviation and music.

Williams died on 31 January 2026, at the age of 93.

== Career ==
Williams was known for his striking modernist church buildings of the late 1950s and early 1960s. He initially worked with Arthur Facebrother, before setting up his own practice (Desmond Williams and Associates) in Manchester in the early 1960s, which in 1968 amalgamated with W and J B Ellis to become Ellis Williams Architects (still in practice today). Williams is regarded as one of the key British architects of the Roman Catholic Liturgical Movement in the UK that resulted in a large number of new modernist Catholic churches being built, and other churches being reordered. A group of architects that included Gillespie, Kidd & Coia, Gerard Goalen, Francis Pollen, Desmond Williams and Austin Winkley utilised contemporary design and construction methods to deliver the "noble simplicity" instructed by Vatican II.

Mainstream Modern noted that Williams's Stella Maris Hostel (1966) was a "subtle but stylised building [that] has been much admired by enthusiasts of modern architecture and is often cited as one of the better, but lesser known examples of its time". It designed to resemble the bridge of a ship. But despite the admiration of modernist enthusiasts it was eventually demolished and replaced by housing.

A number of his buildings have now been listed on the National Heritage List for England including:

- St Augustine, Manchester 1966–1968 (Grade II)
- St Dunstan, Birmingham, 1966–1968 (Grade II)
- St Michael, Penn, Wolverhampton, 1967–1968 (Grade II)
- St Mary Dunstable (Grade II), which was built in 1964 at a cost of £72,000.

The List notes that St Mary's is "an important early work in the career of Desmond Williams, an architect notable for his innovative church buildings at a time of great change in ecclesiastical architecture". Williams said of the building: "It was circular, with the object being to bring as many of the congregation near the altar, and proved very popular in attracting worshippers. The ceiling was inspired by my earlier visits to kings College Chapel in Cambridge."

Other buildings

- St Mary, Blackburn (1959) - Designed by Desmond Williams & Associates whilst working for Arthur Farebrother and Partner
- Sacred Heart, Salford (1962) - Designs completed by Arthur Farebrother and Partner in 1960 but probably the first commission to be completed by Desmond William's own practice
- Immaculate Conception, Bicester (1963)
- St Anthony, Slough (1964)
- St Catherine of Siena, Didsbury (1957)
- St Joseph the Worker, Salford (1965)
- St Joseph, Ashton under Lyme (1965)
- Presbytery, Church of the Holy Trinity, Chipping Norton (1966; Grade II listed) - remodelled and reordered, and the western bell tower taken down, by Desmond Williams Associates
- Stella Maris Hostel (1966)
- Our Lady, Oldham (1967; Grade II listed)
- St Patrick, Rochdale (1968)
- St Patrick, Coventry (1971)

== Works ==
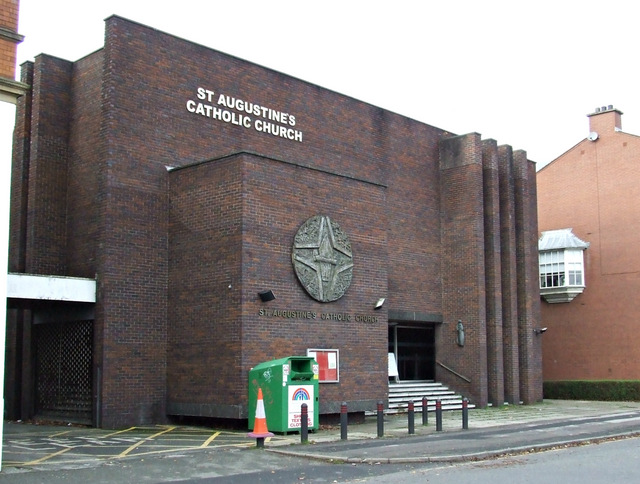
St Augustine's Church, Manchester

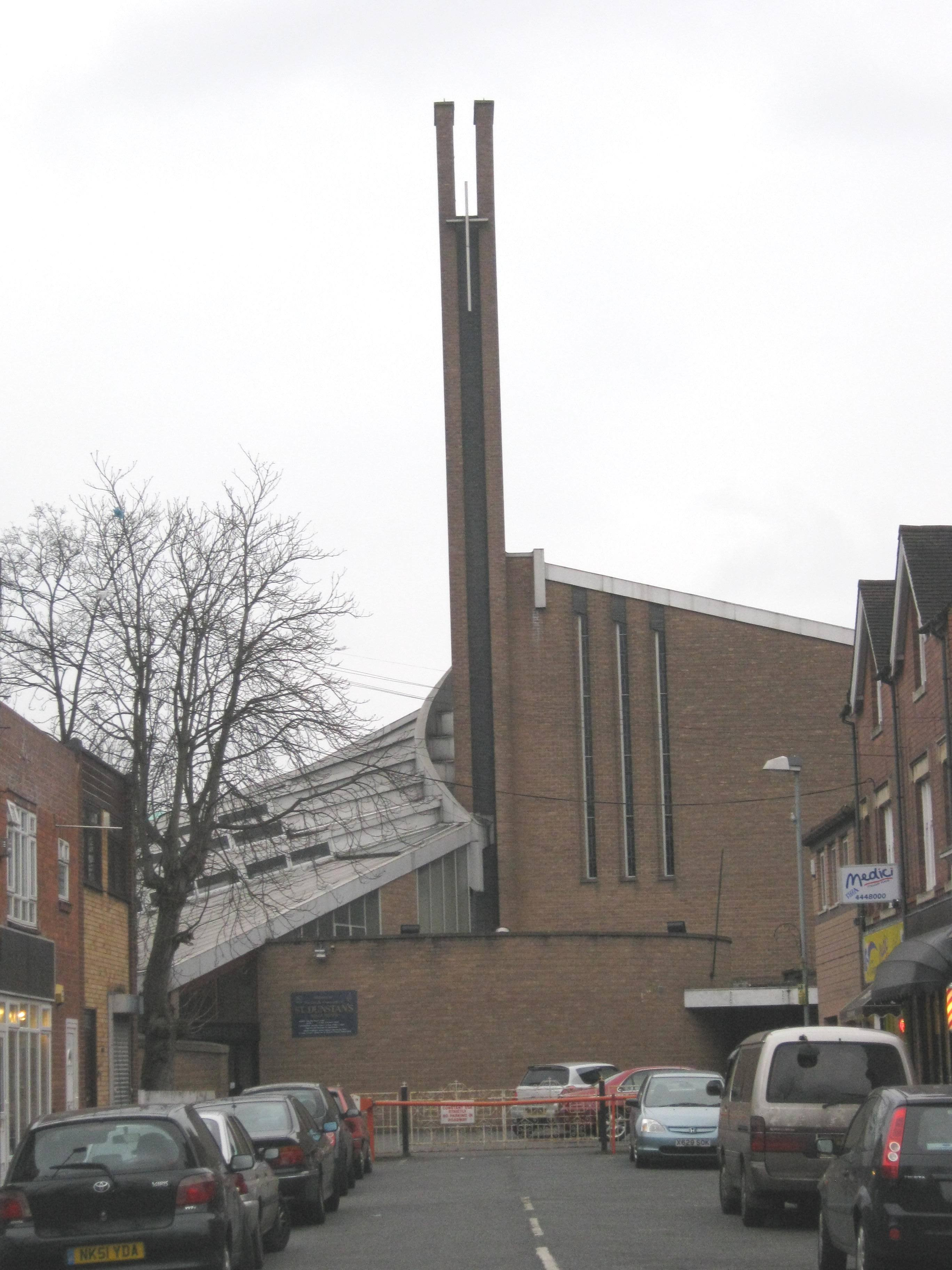
St Dunstan's Church, Birmingham

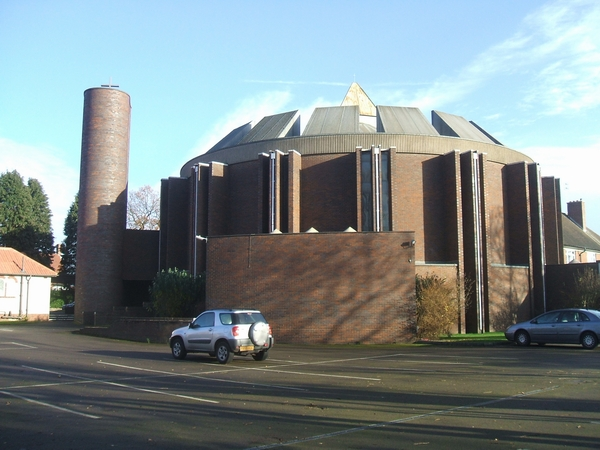
St Michael's Church, Wolverhampton

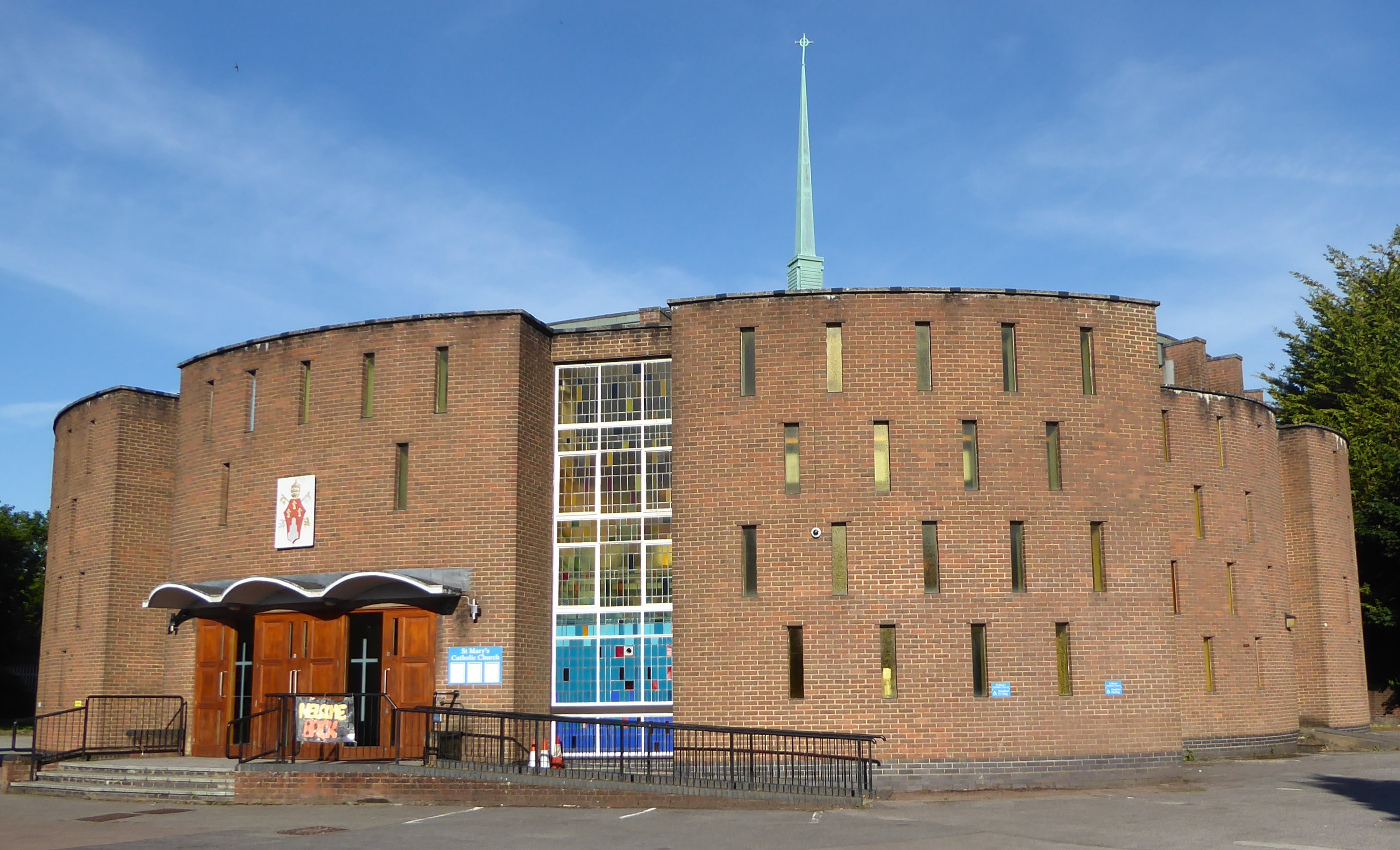
St Mary's Church, Dunstable

== Awards and nominations ==
Williams was appointed an Officer of the Order of the British Empire (OBE) in the 1988 New Year Honours.
