= Charles Davis (theologian) =

English theologian & priest (1923–1999)

Charles Alfred Davis (12 February 1923 – 28 January 1999) was an English theologian and priest, and Professor of Theology at St Edmund's College, Ware, later Professor of Religious Studies at the University of Alberta. In 1966, he caused considerable controversy in both the Catholic and Anglican communities by publicly leaving the Catholic Church on the basis of what he said at the time was an "intellectual rejection of the Papacy."

== Background ==
Davis was born in Swindon to Charles Lionel Davis (1893–1968), a sign painter, and Agatha Ellen Lapham (1893–1979). He was raised as a Catholic and went to school at St. Brendan's Grammar School in Bristol (now St. Brendan's Sixth Form College).

Davis was ordained in 1946 and then had two years of graduate studies at the Pontifical Gregorian University in Rome. He taught at the seminary in St Edmund's Seminary, Ware from 1952 to 1965 and was the first Catholic to give the F. D. Maurice Lectures at King's College London, which were published in 1966 as God's Grace in History. He was also editor of Clergy Review (now The Pastoral Review). He received an appointment to Heythrop College, University of London, in 1965, where he remained for only 16 months.

Davis was a member of The New Churches Research Group (NCRG), a group of Catholic and Anglican church architects and craftspeople who promoted liturgical reform of churches though publications such as The Tablet and Architects' Journal. The group was co-founded by Peter Hammond and included architects Peter Gilbey, Robert Maguire, Keith Murray (an ecclesiastical designer), John Newton (Burles, Newton & Partners), George Pace, Patrick Nuttgens, Patrick Reyntiens (stained glass artist), Austin Winkley and Lance Wright.

== Defection from the Church ==
Davis announced that he was leaving the Catholic Church on 21 December 1966. In an article circulated by Davis at the time of his public exit, he stated that the Church had become too powerful and too dehumanising – "a vast, impersonal, unfree, and inhuman system," and that it had been compromised by its connection with the Nazi regime. The article also argued that orthodoxy had limited his intellectual horizons: "I have had to remove a mountain of ecclesiastical rubble in order to produce a few tiny plants of creative thought." Davis's exit from the Church was included in an autobiography published the following year titled A Question of Conscience.

In 1967, Davis married Florence Henderson (not to be confused with the actress), a Brooklyn-born Catholic theology student and member of The Grail, a Catholic women's movement. While Davis maintained his departure was fundamentally a matter of structural and intellectual integrity, their daughter, Claire Henderson Davis, stated in 2006 that her father left the priesthood to marry her mother.

== Response to his leaving the Church ==
Davis's sudden departure provoked widespread media coverage and intense debate within both Catholic and Anglican communities. The Observer described his actions as leaving a "crisis of authority" in the Church. The Catholic Herald described his defection from the Church as "a cause for sadness, not only for the church, the man himself, and those who admired him and his work, but because of the inevitable bitterness that invariably follows such a step," before suggesting that it would have been preferable if Davis had been quieter in his exit.

The theological impact of Davis's departure was profound, with contemporary commentators describing it as having the same effect on the Catholic Church in Britain as the publication of John A. T. Robinson's Honest to God had on Anglicanism.

Prominent contemporary intellectuals offered varying assessments of his decision:

- Gregory Baum: The Canadian theologian published a detailed response titled The Credibility of the Church Today: A Reply to Charles Davis (1968). Baum countered Davis's individualist critique by emphasizing the communal and evolving nature of Christian tradition, arguing that theologians should work toward reforming the church's structural pathologies from within rather than severing ties with the community.
- Herbert McCabe: The Dominican theologian published a critique – albeit a sympathetic one – in the journal New Blackfriars. McCabe's editorial argued that leaving the Church because it was corrupt was unreasonable since the Church had always been corrupt.
- Elizabeth Anscombe: The philosopher wrote to Davis letting him know that she was glad that he had left the Church, as she regarded his beliefs about the Eucharist as being contrary to Catholic teaching.

== Academic career in Canada ==
Following his departure from the Church, Davis emigrated to Canada to pursue a secular academic career, transitioning his focus toward the academic study of religion and sociology.

He initially moved to Edmonton, where he founded the Department of Religious Studies at the University of Alberta. In 1970, he relocated to Montreal to join Concordia University, where he served as the Chair of the Department of Religious Studies (1971–1979) and later as the Principal of Lonergan University College (1978–1991). He also served as President of the Canadian Society for the Study of Religion.

During his tenure at Concordia, Davis received the prestigious Killam Research Fellowship (1981–1983). His academic work evolved significantly as he began integrating the critical social theory of the Frankfurt School and Jürgen Habermas into contemporary religious thought, helping pioneer the concept of "critical theology."

In 1978, he delivered the Hulsean Lectures at Cambridge University, which were published in 1980 as Theology and Political Society, reflecting his interest in the relation between religion and sociology. In 1995, a collection of essays titled The Promise of Critical Theology was published in Davis's honour.

== Retirement and death ==
In 1991, Davis retired and moved back to Britain, living in Edinburgh. In the last several years of his life, he returned to the Catholic fold and received communion at Mass in Edinburgh and Cambridge. He suffered from Parkinson's disease and died in 1999.

== Selected Bibliography ==
- Liturgy and Doctrine: The Doctrinal Basis of the Liturgical Movement (1960)
- Theology for Today (1962)
- God's Grace in History (1966)
- A Question of Conscience (1967)
- Christ and the World's Religions (1970)
- Temptations of Religion (1973)
- Theology and Political Society (1980)
- What is Living, What is Dead in Christianity Today?: Breaking the Liberal-Conservative Deadlock (1986)
- Soft Bodies in a Hard World: Spirituality for the Vulnerable (1987)
- Religion and the Making of Society: Essays in Social Theology (1993)
