= St James the Deacon's Church, Acomb Moor =

Parish church in York, England

St James the Deacon's Church
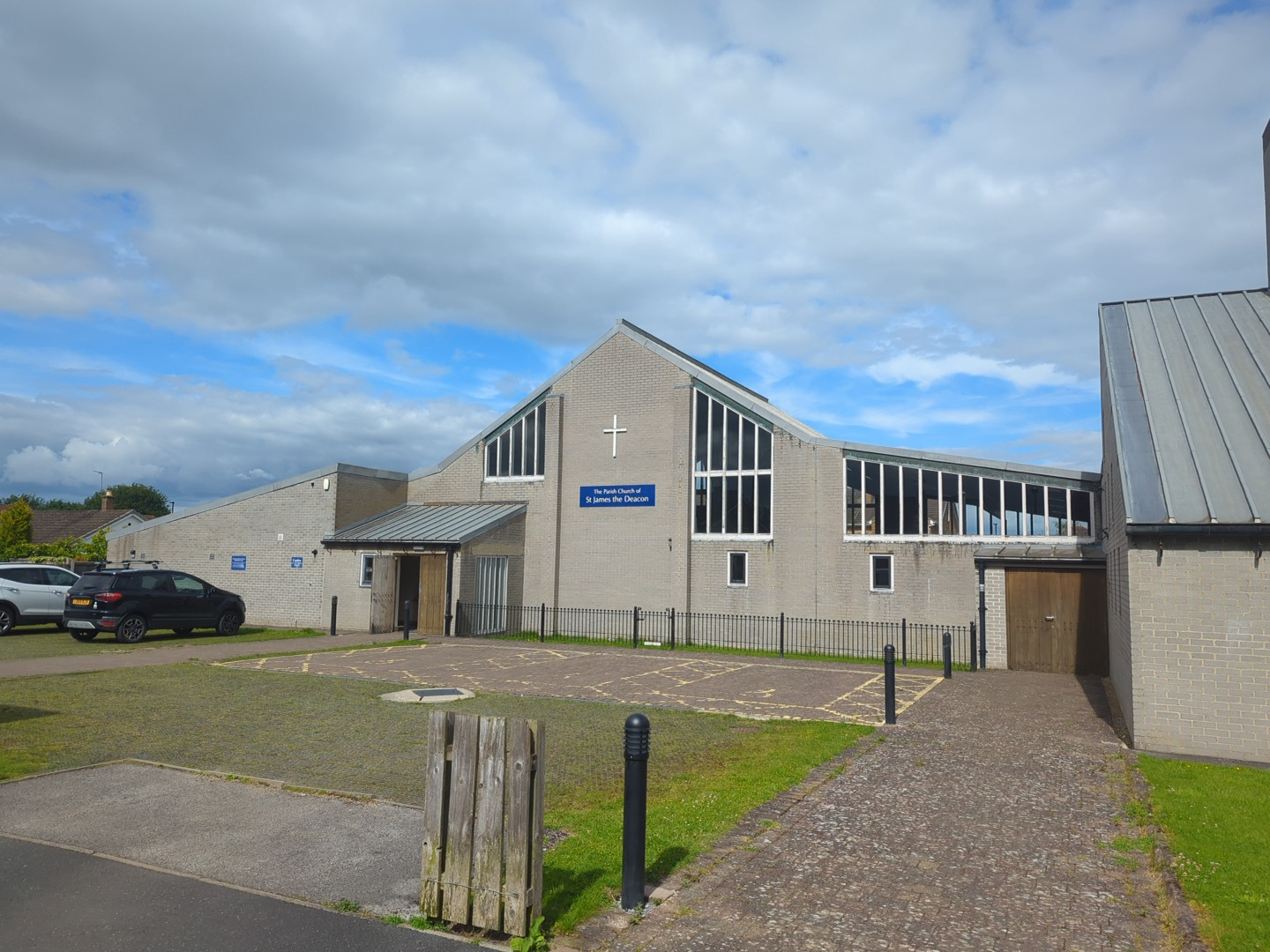
- The church, in 2024
- St James the Deacon's Church
- 53.939874°N 1.124192°W
- OS grid reference: SE 57595 49646
- Location: York, North Yorkshire
- Address: Sherringham Drive, York
- Country: England
- Denomination: Church of England
- Website: jamesthedeacon.org.uk

History
- Status: Active
- Dedication: James the Deacon
- Consecrated: 1971

Architecture
- Architect: George Pace
- Style: Modern
- Groundbreaking: 1969

Specifications
- Materials: Brick

Administration
- Province: York
- Diocese: York
- Archdeaconry: York
- Deanery: York

St James the Deacon's Church is a parish church of the Church of England in Acomb, a suburb of York in England.

A mission church (Note: A mission church is an outlying non-parish church, similar to a chapel of ease, established to reach those for whom the parish church would be inaccessible; it is directly supported by the parish or diocese.) was opened in the Acomb Moor area in 1952, in the parish of St Stephen's Church, Acomb. In 1968, it was granted its own parish. The church building was designed by George Pace, with construction starting in 1969. It was consecrated in 1971. It is the only church dedicated to James the Deacon.

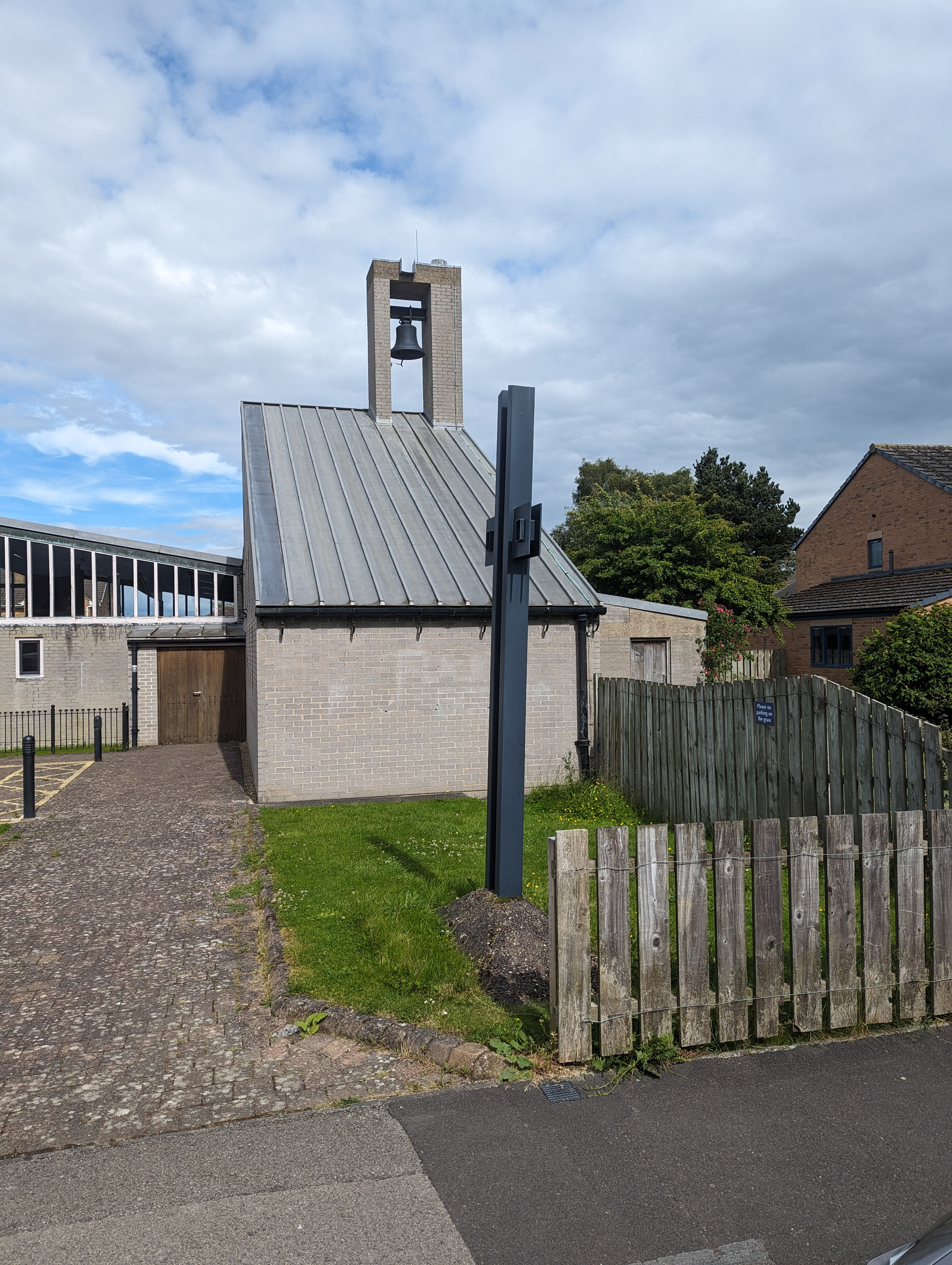
The weekday chapel and bellcote

The church has a large, unequal, pitched roof, with the ridge over the altar. It has multiple vestries and a narthex. A weekday chapel opens off the narthex, with its own single-pitched roof, and a bell turret above. The building incorporates a 12th-century doorway from the demolished St Maurice's Church, a 15th-century font from St Sampson's Church, and a 14th-century altar slab from York Minster. Most other fittings come from St Maurice and St Sampson, and include some 17th-century wooden carvings depicting the Four Evangelists.
