= Church of St Margaret of Scotland, Twickenham =

Church in Twickenham, England

Coordinates: 51.4562°N 0.3199°W

St Margarets Catholic Church
- Roman Catholic Church of St Margaret of Scotland
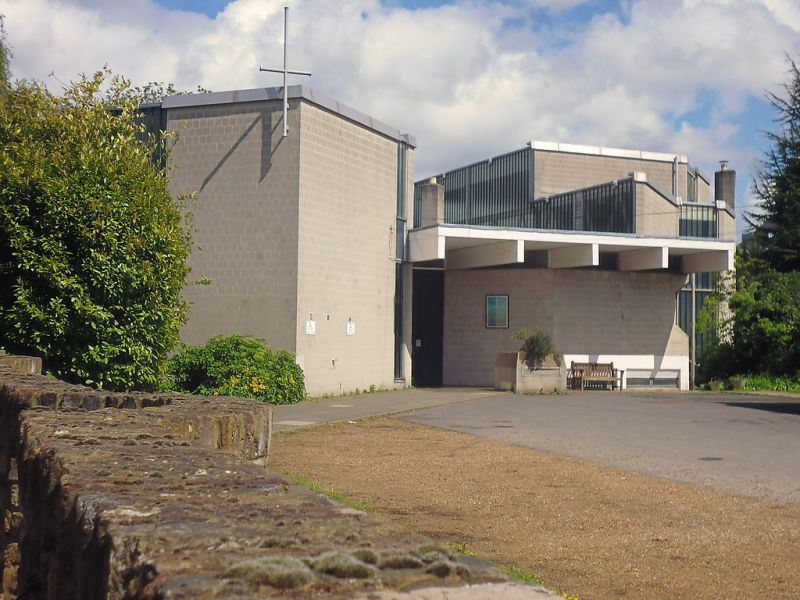
- St Margarets Catholic Church
- OS grid reference: TQ 16830 74358
- Location: 130 St Margaret’s Road, Twickenham TW1 1RL
- Country: England
- Denomination: Roman Catholic
- Website: www.stmargaretsrcchurch.co.uk

Architecture
- Architect: Austin Winkley
- Years built: 1969

Administration
- Diocese: Diocese of Westminster

Clergy
- Priest: Canon Peter Newby

Listed Building – Grade II
- Official name: Church of St Margaret of Scotland
- Designated: 5 May 1999
- Reference no.: 1387183

The Church of St Margaret of Scotland, also known as St Margarets Catholic Church, is a Roman Catholic church on St Margaret's Road in St Margarets, Twickenham, in the London Borough of Richmond upon Thames. The parish was created in 1936. The church building was designed by the architect Austin Winkley who was an influential architect of the Liturgical Movement. It opened in 1969. In 1999 it became a Grade II listed building.

The church is named after the 11th-century English Saxon princess who became Queen of Scotland when she married Malcolm III and who was canonised by Pope Innocent IV in 1250.
