= Colin Boyne =

English architectural journalist

- Born: 15 February 1921; Farway, Devon
- Died: 28 September 2006 (aged 85); Glastonbury, Somerset
- Education: Tonbridge School
- Occupation: Architectural journalist
- Spouse: Rosemary Barnaschone
- Children: Three

Donald Arthur Colin Aydon Boyne (15 February 1921 – 28 September 2006) was an English architectural journalist. He is known as a proponent of modernist architecture and public sector works to provide housing for the people.

== Biography ==
Colin Boyne was born on 15 February 1921 to Lytton Leonard and Millicent Boyne in Devon. He attended Tonbridge School. His family including his father served in the military, so despite his father's early death he was required to join the army serving under the 8th battalion of the 13th frontier force rifles of the Indian Army including in the Burma campaign, where he was shot in 1943. After returning home from his injury, he received a scholarship at the Architectural Association School of Architecture.

Boyne's career included serving as editor of the Architects' Journal from 1953 to 1970 as well chairman of the journal as well as The Architectural Review. His contributions to the former helped bring it into higher repute and popularity.

He married Rosemary Barnaschone in 1947 with whom he had three children. He died in West Mendip Hospital in Glastonbury in 2006.
