= Francis Pollen =

English architect

Francis Anthony Baring Pollen, FRIBA (7 December 1926 – 4 November 1987) was an English architect who designed, amongst other significant buildings, Worth Abbey in West Sussex.

He was born in London on 7 December 1926 and educated at Downside School in Somerset, and Trinity College, Cambridge. In 1950 he married Thérèse Sheridan: they had one son and four daughters. In 1954 he began working for Lionel Brett, 4th Viscount Esher, becoming his partner in 1959. His first commission was a Carmelite convent at Presteigne, Powys. This was followed by other churches, including St John Bosco's at Woodley, Berkshire, and St Peter's, Marlow, Buckinghamshire. The partnership also worked at Downside Abbey (library and archive, 1965–1970; east wing, 1970–1975), for Barclays Bank, and on private houses before Pollen went into business on his own account in 1971.

Pollen is regarded as one of the major British architects of the Roman Catholic Liturgical Movement in the UK that resulted in a large number of new modernist Catholic churches being built, and other churches being reordered. A group of architects that included Gillespie, Kidd & Coia, Gerard Goalen, Desmond Williams, Austin Winkley and Pollen utilised contemporary design and construction methods to realize the 'noble simplicity' required by Vatican II.

In 1978, his daughter Clare married Raymond Asquith, who became Earl of Oxford and Asquith in 2014.

Pollen died on 4 November 1987.
