= H. A. Reinhold =

German Catholic liturgist and resistance member (1897–1968)

Hans Ansgar Reinhold (1897–1968) was a Roman Catholic priest born in Hamburg, Germany. Reinhold took part in the Roman Catholic resistance to the Nazi regime until taking refuge in the United States. He was a prominent liturgical reformer whose work was influential in shaping the changes to the Mass made at the Second Vatican Council. Reinhold was also a prominent advocate for the introduction of modernist architectural ideas to the construction of Catholic churches in the United States.

== Books ==
- The American Parish and the Roman Liturgy: An Essay in seven chapters (Macmillan, 1958), ASIN B0007E8ROA
- Bringing the Mass to the people (Helicon Press, 1960), ASIN B007T3OGV0
- The dynamics of liturgy (Macmillan, 1961), ASIN B007T3M0UE
- Speaking of liturgical architecture (Daughters of St. Paul, 1961), ASIN B0007EHYQM
- H.A.R.: The Autobiography of Father Reinhold (Herder and Herder, 1968) ASIN B0006BRVJQ
- [Edited compilation]The Soul Afire: Revelations of the Mystics (Image Books, 1973), ISBN 0-385-01489-9
- Literatur: Gerhard Besier, Peter Schmidt-Eppendorf (Hrsg,) Hans Ansgar Reinhold, Schriften und Briefwechsel, 588 S., Aschendorf Münster 2011
