= Austin Winkley =

Architect

- Born: 1934 (age 91–92); Lancashire, England
- Education: Architectural Association
- Occupation: Architect
- Practice: Williams & Winkley, Austin Winkley & Associates
- Buildings: Church of St Margaret of Scotland, Twickenham

Austin S. Winkley (born 1934) is a British architect who specialises in church architecture and is a member of the Liturgical Movement of UK ecclesiastical architects.

== Early life and education ==
Winkley was born in 1934 to a family of Lancashire cotton workers. He attended a Salesian school and with their help secured a grant to study at the Architectural Association in London.

== Career ==
Winkley studied at the Architectural Association in London under Robert Maguire and became a member of the New Churches Research Group, a group of Catholic and Anglican church architects and craftspeople who promoted liturgical reform of churches though publications such as The Tablet and Architects' Journal. The group included architects Peter Gilbey, Robert Maguire, Keith Murray (an ecclesiastical designer), John Newton (Burles, Newton & Partners), Patrick Nuttgens, George Pace, Patrick Reyntiens (stained glass artist), Lance Wright, as well as co-founder and Anglican priest Peter Hammond and Catholic priest and theologian Charles Davis.

During the holidays Winkley worked for the Salesians alongside school architect Jeffrey Williams. In 1959, after qualifying, he worked for the London County Council school department. In 1960 he went to the US, where he worked for two architectural practices, joining a firm of Christian architects and working on a library and Catholic Club at Harvard University in Cambridge, Massachusetts, U.S.A. In 1962, he volunteered to help build a clinic, housing and church in an area of Mexico City that had been devastated by an earthquake. In 1963, he set up, Williams & Winkley in the UK. In 1978, he gained a Post Graduate Diploma in Building Conservation from the Architectural Association. In 1987, he founded Austin Winkley & Associates. He began by designing homes for the Catholic Housing Aid Society (CHAS).

Having studied under the church designers Maguire & Murray, Winkley became a member of the UK architectural liturgical movement. His buildings include:

- Church of St Margaret of Scotland, Twickenham (1969) Grade II listed. Winkley's first church and according to its listing "an early and particularly well-made and well-detailed example of post-Vatican II planning".
- St Elphege in Wallington (1971)
- Sacred Heart Church in Coventry (1979)
- St Theodore's in Hampton upon Thames (1987).

He was also behind the reordering of a number of churches, such as:

- Holy Family Church, Halton was reordered into a liturgical arrangement
- St John Vianney, Ilford (1983) - reordering a Catholic church by Donald Plaskett Marshall

== Family ==
Austin Winkley met his future wife, Elizabeth (née Bussy), a drama teacher, at a national Catholic Youth Association Conference. They married in 1967 and have two daughters, Emma, a sculptor and change agent, and Antonia who is a florist.

== Works ==
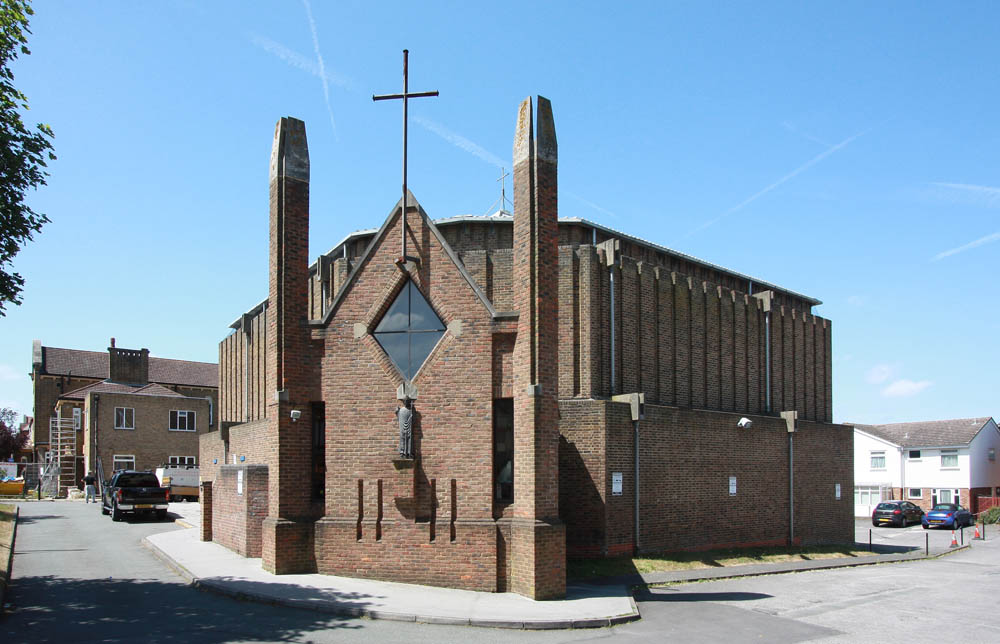
St Elphege's Church, South Beddington

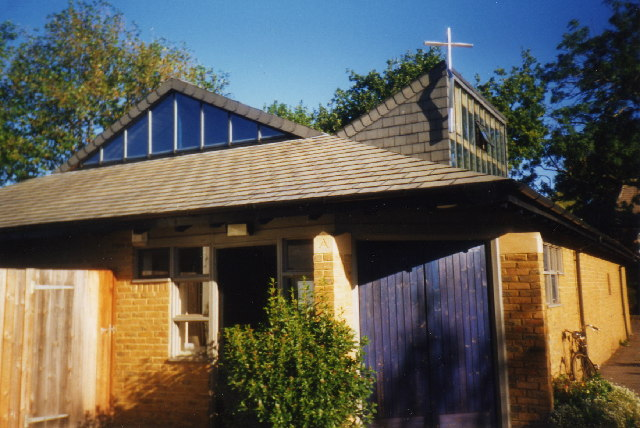
St Theodore's Church, Hampton upon Thames
