= Patrick Nuttgens =

British architect and academic (1930–2004)

Patrick Nuttgens CBE
- Born: Patrick John Nuttgens; 2 March 1930; Whiteleaf, Buckinghamshire, England
- Died: 15 March 2004 (aged 74); York, North Yorkshire, England
- Occupations: Architect; academic
- Spouse: Bridget Badenoch (1954–2004)

Patrick John Nuttgens CBE (2 March 1930 – 15 March 2004) was an influential English architect and academic.

== Early life ==
Nuttgens was born in Whiteleaf, Buckinghamshire, the fourth of five children to Kathleen Mary (née Clarke) an Irish woman and accomplished mathematician, and stained-glass artist Jozef Edward Nuttgens who was born in Aachen, Germany. His mother died when he was seven years old during his first term at Grace Dieu Manor School, near Leicester. His father subsequently remarried and had eight more children - one of whom was the stained glass designer Joseph Ambrose Nuttgens. As a noted stained glass designer, Joseph took his family to live next to Eric Gill and his friends at Piggotts, Speen, Buckinghamshire.

Nuttgens was brought up Roman Catholic, attending Ratcliffe College, run by Rosminian Fathers where he contracted poliomyelitis at the age of 12 and was hospitalised for two years, finally leaving hospital in 1944. Nuttgens later studied architecture and painting at Edinburgh College of Art and the University of Edinburgh, graduating in 1953 and completing his PhD in 1959. He was elected to ARIBA in 1956. While he was at the University of Edinburgh he met Bridget Badenoch (known as 'Biddy'), an English literature student, whom he married in 1954. The couple had nine children, including Susie Hargreaves, the composer Sandy Nuttgens and the Green Party politician and broadcaster Peg Alexander.

== Career ==
Robert Matthew appointed Nuttgens as the chief administrator, lecturer and assistant at the newly founded architecture department at the University of Edinburgh. In 1962, Nuttgens became director of the Institute of Advanced Architectural Studies at the University of York, and later professor of architecture (1968). In 1969, he was appointed first director of Leeds Polytechnic (later Leeds Metropolitan University, now Leeds Beckett University). He was Hoffman Wood Professor of Architecture at the University of Leeds from 1968 to 1970 and again from 1984 to 1985.

Nuttgens was awarded honorary doctorates by several universities including Heriot-Watt in 1990 and was appointed CBE in 1983. His books include The Story of Architecture, The Art of Learning: a Personal Journey, The Home Front: Housing the People (1840–1990), York... the Continuing City (illustrated by John Shannon), Leeds: The Back to Front, Inside-out, Upside-down City (1979) and The Mitchell Beazley Pocket Guide to Architecture. Nuttgens also had a regular columns in The Times Higher Educational Supplement.

Patrick Nuttgens was the first disabled person in a wheelchair to write and present a factual series on BBC Television, 'The Home Front' BBC2 1989

=== Membership of NCRG ===
Nuttgens was a member of The New Churches Research Group (NCRG), a group of Catholic and Anglican church architects and craftspeople who promoted liturgical reform of churches though publications such as The Tablet and Architects' Journal. The group was co-founded by Peter Hammond and included architects Peter Gilbey, Robert Maguire, Keith Murray (an ecclesiastical designer), John Newton (Burles, Newton & Partners), George Pace, Patrick Reyntiens (stained glass artist), Austin Winkley, Lance Wright, as well as Catholic priest and theologian Charles Davis.

== Later years and death ==
In 1981 he wrote a television documentary on Edwin Lutyens. But from 1985 became a wheelchair user as his health worsened. He resigned in 1986 from his academic post after he was (mistakenly) diagnosed with multiple sclerosis. Later, it was discovered he was suffering from post-polio syndrome. He began a career writing, broadcasting, painting and travelling. In 1989, for example, he wrote and introduced a television history of British housing, The Home Front. He also appeared on radio where he was a regular participant in A Word in Edgeways and Round Britain Quiz. He sat on a great number of committees, including the Royal Fine Art Commission (1983–90) and the York Theatre Royal Board (1990–96). He also chaired the BBC’s northern advisory council and its committee on continuing education. He was awarded honorary doctorates by a number of universities and in 1983 he was awarded a CBE.

Nuttgens lived in Terrington and died in York hospital on 15 March 2004 from post-polio syndrome. The University of York and the York Georgian Society offer an annual award named in his honour, first offered in 2008. The award provides a grant for two PhD students to research any aspect of the Georgian period. The first prize was awarded to Katie Crowther from the Department of English and Related Literature for her paper 'Georgian Paper Traces: Women's Stories, Ephemeral Texts and Hidden Objects'.

== Publications ==
- Reginald Fairlie 1883–1952 (1959)
- Leeds: The Back to Front, Inside-out, Upside-down City Stile Publications (1979)
- The Story of Architecture (1983 and 1997)
- Understanding Modern Architecture (1988)
- What Should We Teach and How Should We Teach it? Taylor & Francis (1988)
- The Home Front: Housing The People, 1840–1990 London (1989)
- Furnished Landscape: Applied Art in Public Places Bellew Publishing (1992)
- The Mitchell Beazley Pocket Guide to Architecture Mitchell Beazley (1992)
- The Story of Architecture Phaidon Press (2nd Ed 1997)
- The Art of Learning: A Personal Journey Book Guild Publishing (2000)
- York: The Continuing City by Patrick Nuttgens (author) and John Shannon (photographer), Dales Court Press (2002)
- The History of York: From Earliest Times to the Year 2000 Blackthorn Press (2007)

== Broadcasting ==
- Edwin Lutyens: Last Architect Of The Age Of Humanism (1981)
- In Search of the City (1973)
- Spirit of the Age (1975)
- The Flight from Utopia (1985)
- The Home Front (1989) BBC Leeds
