= Virgil Michel =

American religious and social activist (1890–1938)

Virgil Michel OSB
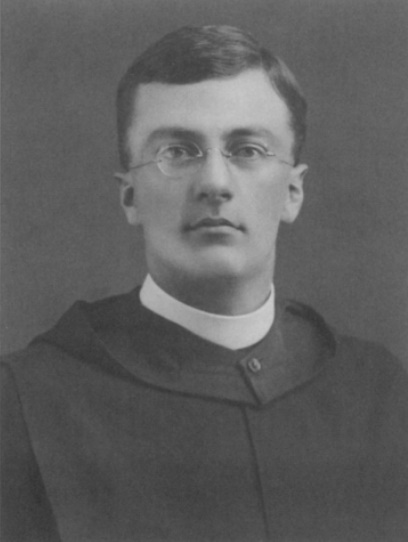

Personal details
- Born: June 26, 1890 St. Paul, Minnesota, U.S
- Died: November 26, 1938 (aged 48) Collegeville, Minnesota, U.S

Virgil Michel, OSB (born George Michel; June 26, 1890 – November 26, 1938) was an American Benedictine monk known for his advocacy of the Liturgical Movement, religious education and social justice.

== Biography ==
Michel was born in Saint Paul, Minnesota, on June 26, 1890, to Fred and Mary Michel. Michel spent much of his childhood holidays on his grandfather's farm in Scott County. After an education at Saint John’s Preparatory School in Collegeville, Minnesota, where he was noted for both his seriousness and energy, Michel joined the Benedictine Order, taking the name "Virgil". Michel then went on to obtain a doctorate in English and a licentiate in theology at the Catholic University of America. It was there where Michel encountered the ideas of Thomas Edward Shields, a supporter of liturgical revival who believed that it was the “organic teaching of the Church”.

In 1924, after a stint teaching at Saint John's University, Michel began studying under Joseph Gredt in Rome. However, he moved to Louvain for the next academic term. Michel made a number of study trips across Europe, where he became further informed on liturgical revival. He was especially influenced by Lambert Beauduin. His time in Europe led Michel to come to the conclusion that liturgical reform was crucial, especially in America. In order to fulfil this aim, he began planning a “Popular Liturgical Library” of literature in order to establish a liturgical review.

In 1925, Michel returned to America, where he established a liturgical review, Orate Fratres, which was eventually renamed Worship. By 1930, Michel's eyesight began to fail, leading him to retreat to a Native American mission, where he organized seminarians in their catechizing of the Ojibwe people. He returned to St. John's in 1933, where he advocated for reforms, such as changing the liturgy to the vernacular from Latin and including women in “positions of lay leadership". Michel also believed in further education, believing that "the real task of a liturgical movement [was] an educational one".

During this time, Michel became deeply concerned with social issues, a key issue in the years following the Great Depression. Michel was closely associated with the philosophical school of personalism (he wrote an introduction to Emmanuel Mounier's The Personalist Manifesto in 1938), believing that capitalism had led to "depersonalization", where the human person was reduced to being merely a "cog in a machine". For Michel, capitalism damages a person's human values, as it is too individualistic, and has led to the individual being too separated "from all contact with the whole product in its finished form... as it has separated the laborer altogether from personal attachment to the tools he works with". Michel believed that the solution to this was Christianity, especially the "Christian principle of the solidarity of mankind". This, in Michel's view, would lead to decentralized and independent economic system. He also supported the concept of employee-owned business, which he believed would "decentralize economic power as well as ownership".

In his final years, Michel was involved in correspondences with a number of philosophers, such as Richard Hocking, Scott Buchanan and Mortimer Adler. Adler in particular influenced Michel to support the educational theory of the University of Chicago, as well as Adler's Great Books program. Michel's heavily active schedule damaged his health, and in 1938 he contracted pneumonia. He died at Saint John’s infirmary on November 26, 1938, and was buried in Saint John’s Abbey Cemetery.
