= The Pastoral Review =

International academic journal

The Pastoral Review (formerly Clergy Review and then Priests & People) is an international academic journal serving ordained and lay ministers in the Roman Catholic Church since 1931, published by the Tablet Publishing Co of England.

Its prior editor was David Sanders, who was succeeded at the beginning of 2005 by Michael Hayes, then head of the School of theology, philosophy, and history and subsequently vice principal of St Mary's University, Twickenham, University of Surrey, and then president of Mary Immaculate College in Limerick until his death in April 2017. The editor from April 2017 until his death in June 2022 was Anthony Towey. The current editor is Ashley Beck, also based at St Mary's University.

An unrelated 'journal and a record of all matters affecting the pastoral and agricultural interests throughout Australasia' with the same name was published from 1913-1977.

== Annual congress ==
Annually in early summer, a two-day gathering of theology and faith at the service of the Gospel in the parish, school, home and workplace is held on the ground of St. Mary's campus. Workshops and lectures range from concepts in scripture, divinity in modern forms, interaction with art, media, outreach, and other topics.

== As a research publication ==
- A 1964 article, "Mary: Sign of Contradiction or Source of Unity" was cited in the 1979 book Multiple Echo Explorations in Theology by Cornelius Ernst.
- A 2007 article, "International Presbyterates" by Ronald Knott was cited in the book Who Do We Think We Are?: How Catholic Priests Understand Themselves Today by Christopher A. Fallon.
- A 2010 article, "Ongoing Priestly Formation: Option or Necessity?" was cited in the book Gold Tested in Fire: A New Pentecost for the Catholic Priesthood by Ronald D. Witherup.
- A 2015 paper called Child slavery and child labour, relating to Catholic social teaching, was presented at the University of Glasgow, the source material for which was a series in The Pastoral Review.

== Prominent contributors ==
- In 1978, televised art historian and critic Sister Wendy Beckett wrote a letter rhetorically asking "What is prayer?," in the Clergy Review.
- Dr. William Newton, Professor of Theology at Franciscan University of Steubenville.
- Thomas D. Stegman, S.J. Dean and Professor of New Testament at Boston College School of Theology and Ministry.

== Publication ==
Four volumes are now published per year. The journal is also available on iTunes in English, French, and Spanish.
