= George Pace =

English architect (1915–1975)

George Gaze Pace CVO
- Born: 31 December 1915; Croydon, Surrey, England
- Died: 23 August 1975 (aged 59); York, North Yorkshire, England
- Occupation: Architect

George Gaze Pace, CVO (31 December 1915 – 23 August 1975) was an English architect who specialised in ecclesiastical works.

He was trained in London, and served in the army, before being appointed as surveyor to a number of cathedrals. Most of his work was carried out on churches, although he did some secular work. His architectural style was Modernist, but he respected traditional styles, and on occasions combined both styles in his works.

== Early life and training ==
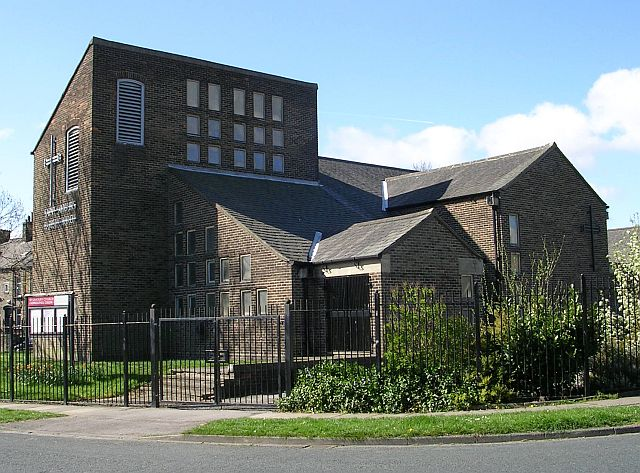
St Saviour's Church, Fairweather Green, Bradford, one of Pace's Modernist churches

George Pace was born in Croydon, Surrey, the son of a ship owner's clerk. He was educated at Addiscombe New College, and then became articled to James Ransome and Cootes in London. He studied in the evenings at Regent Street Polytechnic. Then went on to work with Darcy Braddell and Humphrey Deane, and then with Pite, Son, and Fairweather. During this time he won prizes, including the Pugin scholarship. After qualifying as an architect in 1939, he taught at the polytechnic, but in 1941 he was called up for army service. In that year he married Ina Florence Catherine Jones. During his army service he was commissioned and worked as a supervising architect, based in York.

== Career and later life ==
When in 1949 Pace was appointed as surveyor to the diocese of Sheffield, he resigned his commission and established a private practice in York. During that year he was elected a fellow of the Royal Institute of British Architects. Also in 1949 he was appointed as consulting architect to Lichfield and Llandaff Cathedrals, succeeding Sir Charles Nicholson. Much of his career was spent in restoring and repairing churches, and in designing new fittings, but he also designed new churches. Pace created a design for a cathedral in Ibadan, Nigeria, but it was not built. His works were almost completely ecclesiastical, but he did design a library for Durham University, and carried out repairs at Castle Howard.

Pace was appointed a Commander of the Royal Victorian Order (CVO) in 1971, in recognition of his work with Paul Paget and Peter Philips on the design for the King George VI Memorial Chapel at St George's Chapel, Windsor Castle.

With his wife, Pace had five children. His son, Peter, also trained as an architect, and wrote a book about his father's works. George Pace was also a writer and lecturer, and was concerned about conservation issues, being a member of the York Civic Trust and the York Georgian Society. He died in York in 1975, and his practice was continued by his assistant, Ronald Sims. His ashes are interred in the Retro-choir of Southwark Cathedral.

== Influences and works ==
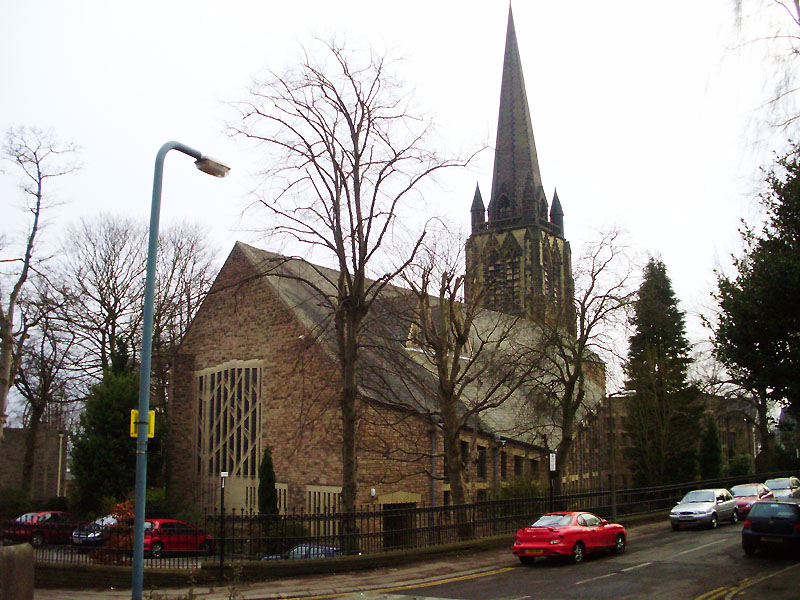
The Church of St Mark, Broomhill, Sheffield, where Pace carried out work in both Gothic Revival and Modernist styles

In respect of his influences, Pace's son, Peter, in the biography of his father, states that Charles Rennie Mackintosh was an early influence. He also quoted a fellow student who said "whilst most of the students enthused about Lloyd Wright or Gropius, George was more concerned with the ideas of William Morris, Lethaby and Burges". The authors of the Buildings of England series note the influence of Le Corbusier in his design of the William Temple Memorial Church in Wythenshawe, Greater Manchester (1963–65). Although Pace's works were mainly Modernist in style, he also respected traditional styles, and sometimes combined elements of both.

Pace was a member of The New Churches Research Group (NCRG), a group of Catholic and Anglican church architects and craftspeople who promoted liturgical reform of churches though publications such as The Tablet and Architects' Journal. The group was co-founded by Peter Hammond and included architects Peter Gilbey, Robert Maguire, Keith Murray (an ecclesiastical designer), John Newton (Burles, Newton & Partners), Patrick Nuttgens, Patrick Reyntiens (stained glass artist), Austin Winkley, Lance Wright, as well as Catholic priest and theologian Charles Davis.

New churches designed by Pace that are entirely Modernist include St Mark, Chadderton, Greater Manchester (1962–63), the William Temple Memorial Church, and St Saviour, Fairweather Green, Bradford, West Yorkshire (1966). Also Modernist are the chapels at St. Michael's College, Llandaff (1957–59), Scargill House, Wharfedale, North Yorkshire (1958–61), and Keele University, Staffordshire (1964–65). The Addleshaw Tower, a free-standing bell tower for Chester Cathedral, Cheshire (1973–75), Pace's last major work, again is Modernist in style.

Modernist and traditional styles are combined in St Mark, Broomhill, Sheffield, South Yorkshire (1955–67), a church that had been badly damaged in the Second World War. Here Pace restored the spire and the porch in Gothic Revival style, but rebuilt the body of the church in Modernist style. In the Holy Redeemer Church, York (1959–65), he re-used material from a demolished medieval church. At All Saints' Church, Pontefract, West Yorkshire (1966–67), Pace built a new nave and vestry within the ruins of a church that had been damaged in the Civil War.

== See also ==
- List of works by George Pace
