= William Temple Memorial Church, Wythenshawe =

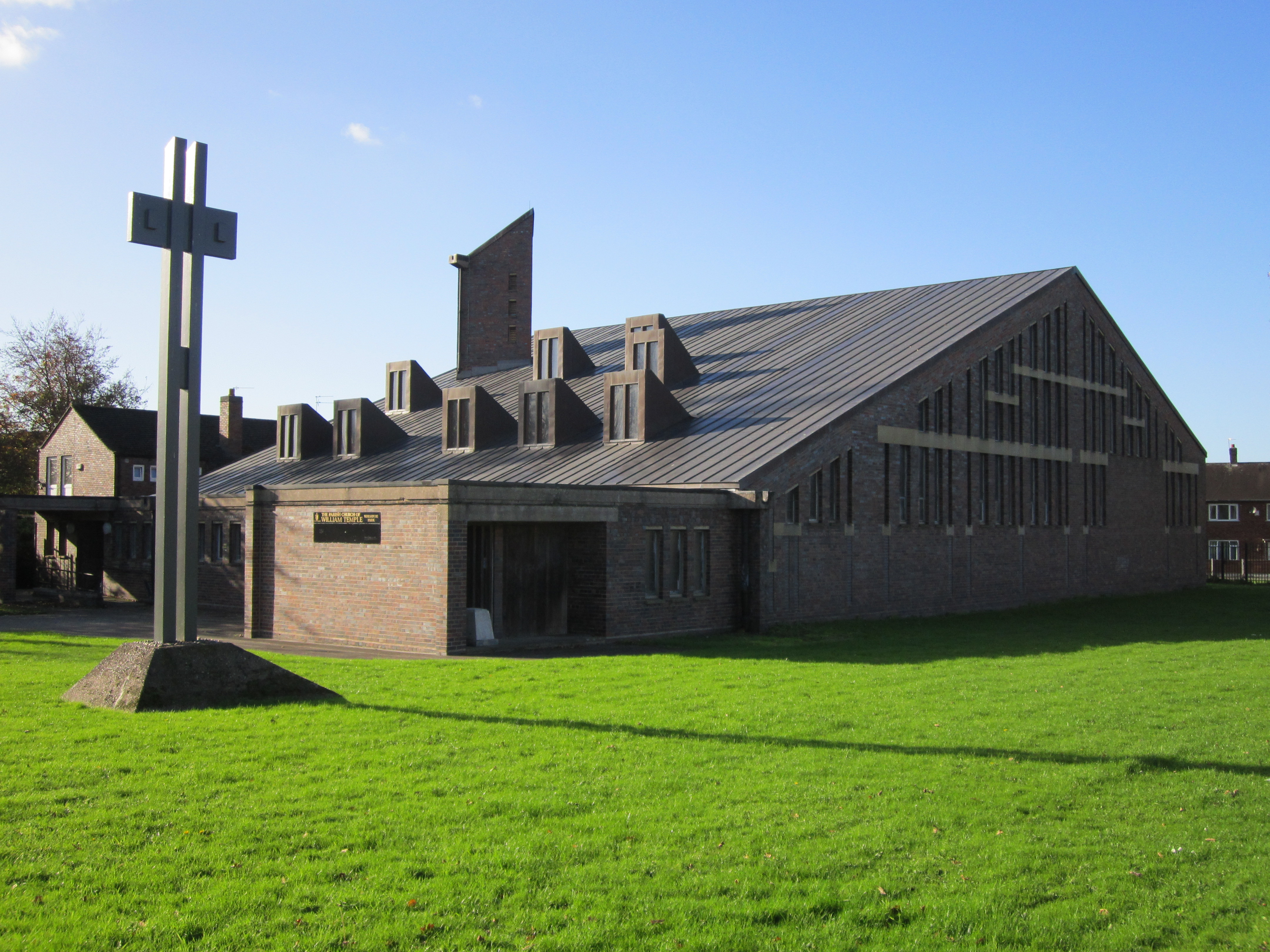
- Exterior of the church
- William Temple Memorial Church, Wythenshawe
- 53.377640°N 2.263785°W
- OS grid reference: SJ 82528 86786
- Location: Wythenshawe, Greater Manchester
- Country: England
- Denomination: Church of England
- Website: https://www.wythenshawe-anglican.org/williamtemple.html

Architecture
- Heritage designation: Grade II
- Architect: George Pace
- Years built: 1959-60

Administration
- Division: Deanery of Withington
- Diocese: Manchester
- Parish: Wythenshawe

William Temple Memorial Church is a parish church in Wythenshawe, Manchester, dedicated to the bishop William Temple.

It is a Grade II listed building, designed by George Pace in the Modernist style, and built in 1964–1965. It has a pitched roof with dormer windows.
