= Church of St Mark, Broomhill =

Church of St Mark, Broomhill & Broomhall
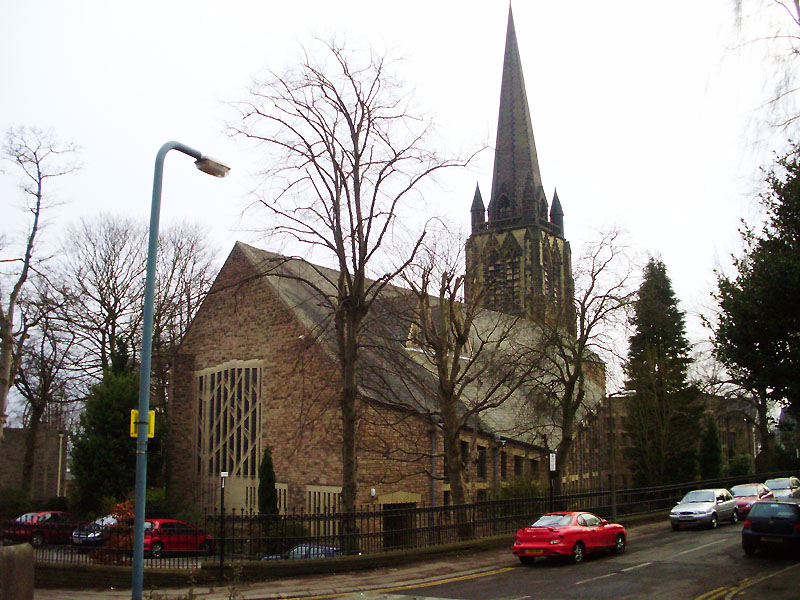
- Church of St Mark, Broomhill & Broomhall
- 53.3775°N 1.4953°W
- OS grid reference: SK 33671 86855
- Location: Broomhill, Sheffield, South Yorkshire, S10 2SE
- Country: England
- Denomination: Church of England
- Churchmanship: Progressive
- Website: Church website

History
- Status: Active

Architecture
- Functional status: Parish church
- Architect(s): William Henry Crossland, George Pace
- Style: Gothic Revival/Modern
- Completed: 1871; 1963

Administration
- Diocese: Diocese of Sheffield
- Archdeaconry: Archdeaconry of Sheffield and Rotherham
- Deanery: Hallam Deanery
- Parish: Sheffield St. Mark Broomhill

Clergy
- Vicar: The Revd Dr Beth Keith

The Church of St Mark is a Church of England parish church in the Broomhill suburb of Sheffield, South Yorkshire, England. It is dedicated to St Mark the Evangelist. Since 2000 it has served the amalgamated parishes of Broomhill and Broomhall.

== History ==
Broomhill grew up in the early 19th century as Sheffield experienced rapid population growth as a result of industrialisation. In order to serve the ecclesiastical needs of this new community, a church dedicated to St Mark was founded on the present site in 1854 with monies provided by steelmaker William Butcher.

The first building was a prefabricated and galvanised iron structure, the type of which would commonly come to be referred to as a tin tabernacle. Always intended to be temporary, it survived only until 1868, when construction began on a grand stone building in Gothic Revival style designed by William Henry Crossland, typical of the era. Crossland's church was completed in 1871 and would serve the community for the next seven decades.

On the night of 12 December 1940, Crossland's building was largely destroyed by an incendiary bomb during what would become known as the "Sheffield Blitz". Once the site was cleared only the two-stage south-west tower, including the south porch below and crocketed spire that rises above, were left standing.

In 1955 the architect George Pace, who had been appointed as surveyor to the Diocese of Sheffield in 1949, was commissioned to stabilise and restore the tower. Alongside this project, Pace was asked to provide designs for the rebuilding of St Mark's into a functioning parish church once more. The specification required Pace to retain Crossland's tower, incorporating it into the new building. However, the brief also provided Pace with the freedom to work in his preferred modern architectural style, utilising contemporary materials and construction methods.

The building would remain a ruin for a further six years as Pace developed a series of designs. Only on his third attempt, a somewhat scaled down proposal for the site, did his scheme meet with the approval of the Diocese; a decision influenced as much by cost considerations as architectural merit. Construction began on the new church in 1961 and it was completed in time for reconsecration in September 1963 by the Bishop of Sheffield.

In 1973, Crossland's tower and porch were awarded Grade II listed heritage status. The listing was revised in 1999 to encompass the whole church.

In 2013 the Twentieth Century Society named St Mark's Church as one of the 10 best modern church buildings in the UK.

== Architecture and fittings ==
Pace's pragmatic design for St Mark's Church uses the architectural language of modernism to render a unified structure that, while incorporating the surviving Victorian Gothic Revival elements, is neither imitative nor subservient to them. This dialogue of styles was recognised by Nikolaus Pevsner as a specific strength of the design.

Pace's new building for the site rises within a reinforced concrete frame, with cavity walls filled with rubble stone and artificial lintels and transoms, incorporating some old fabric up to plinth level. Both the north and south elevations are filled with a repeating pattern of narrow rectangular windows of varying height, their modern appearance clearly signaling the marriage of styles.

Entry is via a door in the north west corner of the building, through a corridor-like foyer that runs the full length of the west end. The nave is preceded by a narthex, formed from the placement of a south-west side chapel and north-west hall. Beyond, the nave and chancel open on an asymmetrical polygonal plan, appearing somewhat organic in shape.

The multitude of narrow windows to north and south, all clear-glazed, ensure that the nave is flooded with light, and effect enhanced by the primarily white walls. Above, the roof is open to the rafters and also painted white. To the north, the concrete structural supports that hold up the roof are used to delineate the baptistry and choir. Pace's huge organ case is positioned in the north east corner.

As well as providing the design for the new church, Pace also designed a complete set of modernist fittings. These remain almost entirely intact. The large two-deck pulpit and lectern, positioned in the south east corner, is carved from Derbyshire fossil stone and has a large sounding board above. The baptismal font has an elaborate cast iron corona cover. The choir stalls and pews are all in timber, rendered in a minimalist style that compliments the overall architectural scheme.

=== Stained glass ===
The programme of stained glass for St Mark's Church was executed as an integral part of Pace's architectural plan, intended to compliment the modernist aesthetic.

The east window, installed in 1963, provides a striking focal point for worship behind the main altar. It was commissioned from glassmaker Harry Stammers. Set within a rectangular concrete frame, the modern figurative design draws on the traditional hymn Te Deum laudamus, and depicts the image of Christ in Majesty to the centre, interwoven among a multitude of saints, worshippers, animals and plants. Thick window bars formed from concrete blocks serve to fragment the window into 48 individual lights, taking the form of branches. Below are a series of narrow lancets with glass also by Stammers.

Balancing the east window along the longitudinal axis of the church, the west window was designed by John Piper and manufactured in collaboration with his longtime partner, Patrick Reyntiens. Set above the entrance to the narthex, it takes the form of an irregular pentagon, with irregular window bars that mirror those to the east window, splitting the window into 38 individual lights. Piper's semi-abstract composition, on the theme of the Flames of Pentecost, is rendered in streaks of yellow, orange and red, set against a deep blue ground. Its symbolism has also been interpreted as representative of the destruction and resurrection of the building itself.

The side chapel, located in the south west corner, contains has an abstract glazing scheme of 18 windows created by Gillian Rees-Thomas around 1963. Primarily composed of subtle yellow-toned glass to the upper windows and clear glass to the lower, the stylistic emphasis is on the intricate detail of the leading, recalling the story of Jacob's ladder.

== Parish ==
The parish of Broomhill has increased in both area and population size over the years. In the 1970s, the parish boundaries were expanded to include the university campus when St George's Church was closed. In 2000, the church of St Silas, which served the neighbouring parish of Broomhall, was also closed and the parishes were combined into the single parish of Broomhill and Broomhall.

St Mark's holds regular services throughout the week and is a fully inclusive church. It hold a monthly service for LGBTQIA people as well as hosts its annual Big Queer Carol service.

== Gallery ==
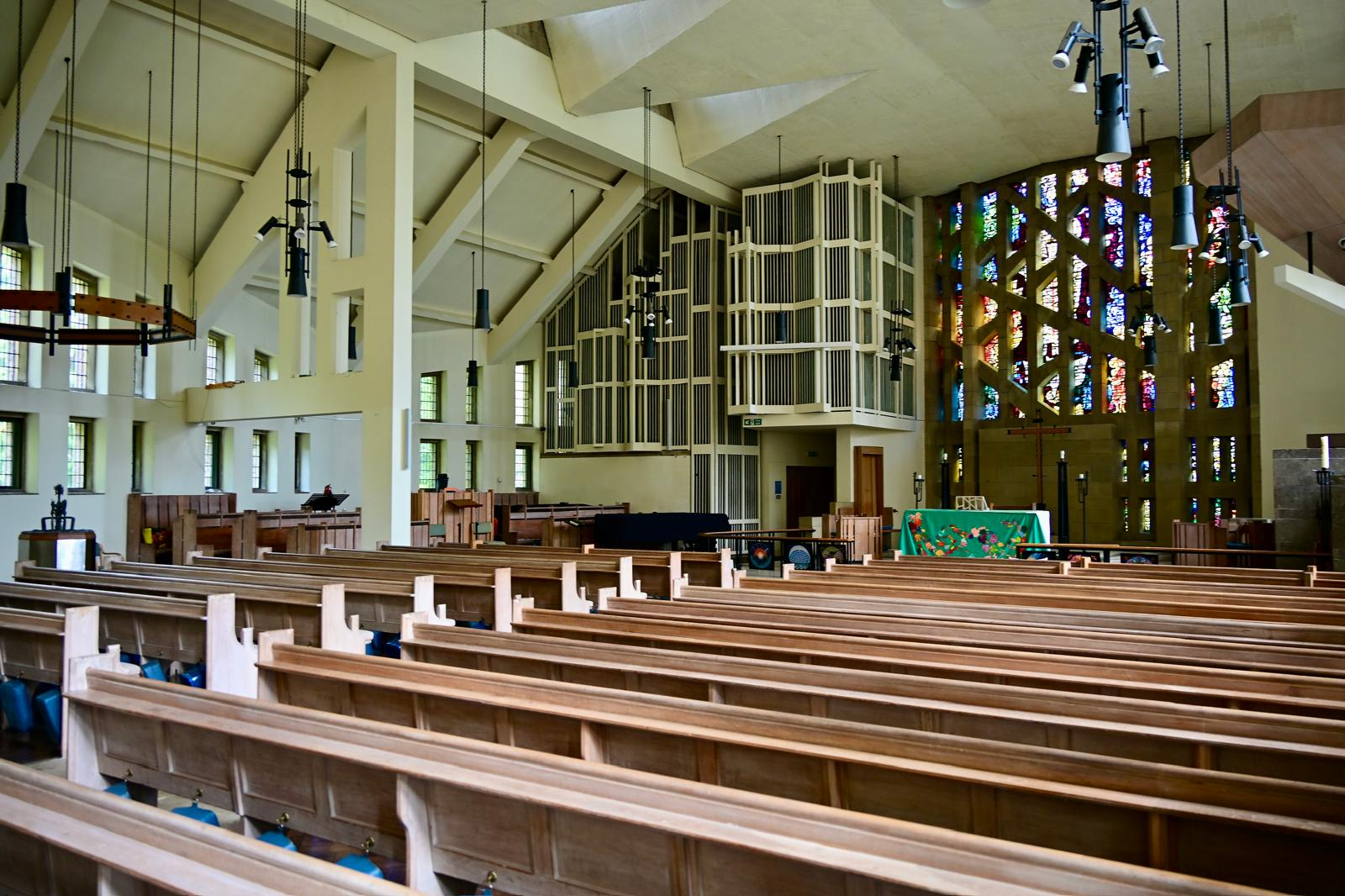
Interior view from south-west

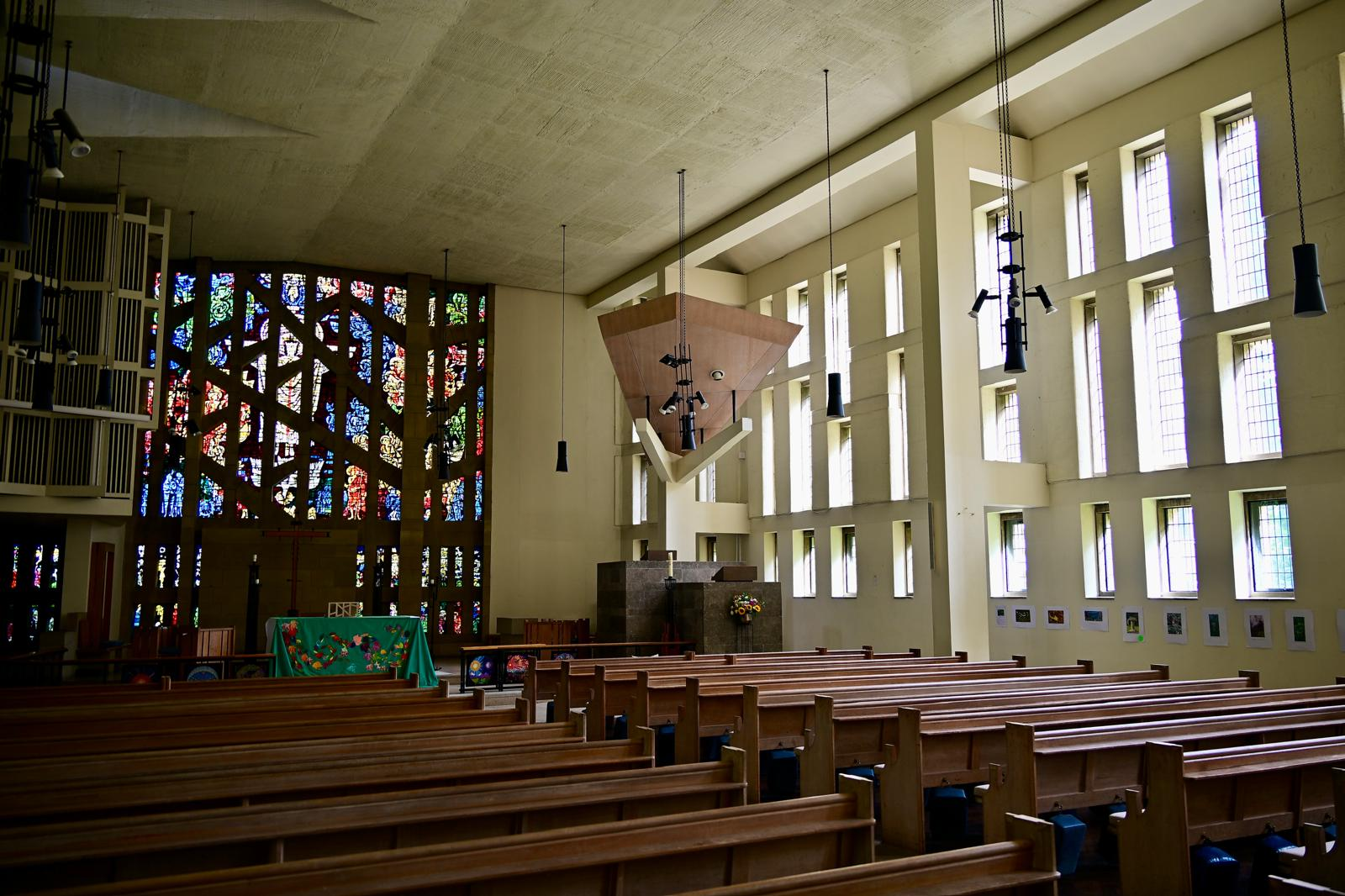
Interior view from north-west

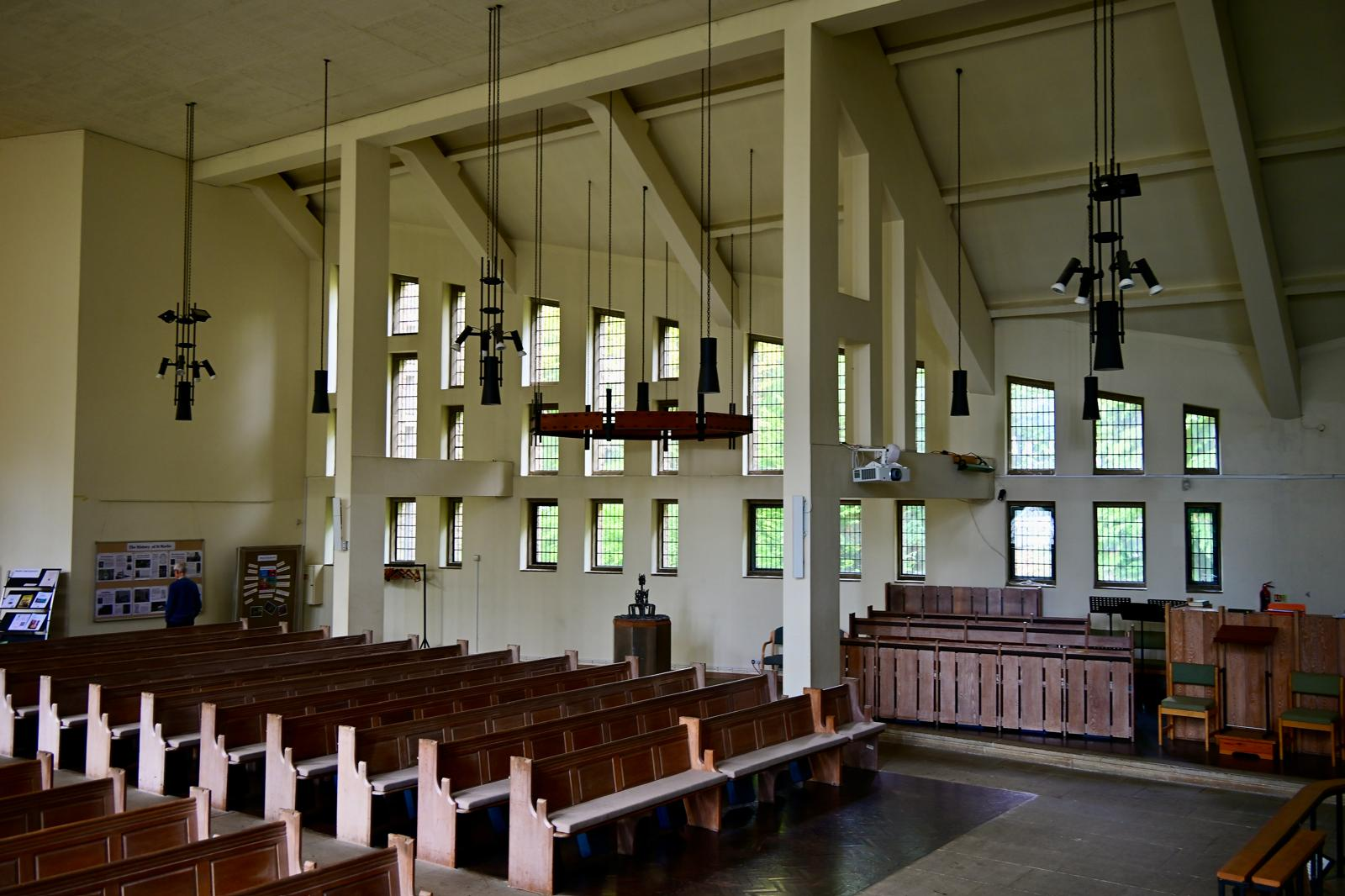
Interior view from south-east

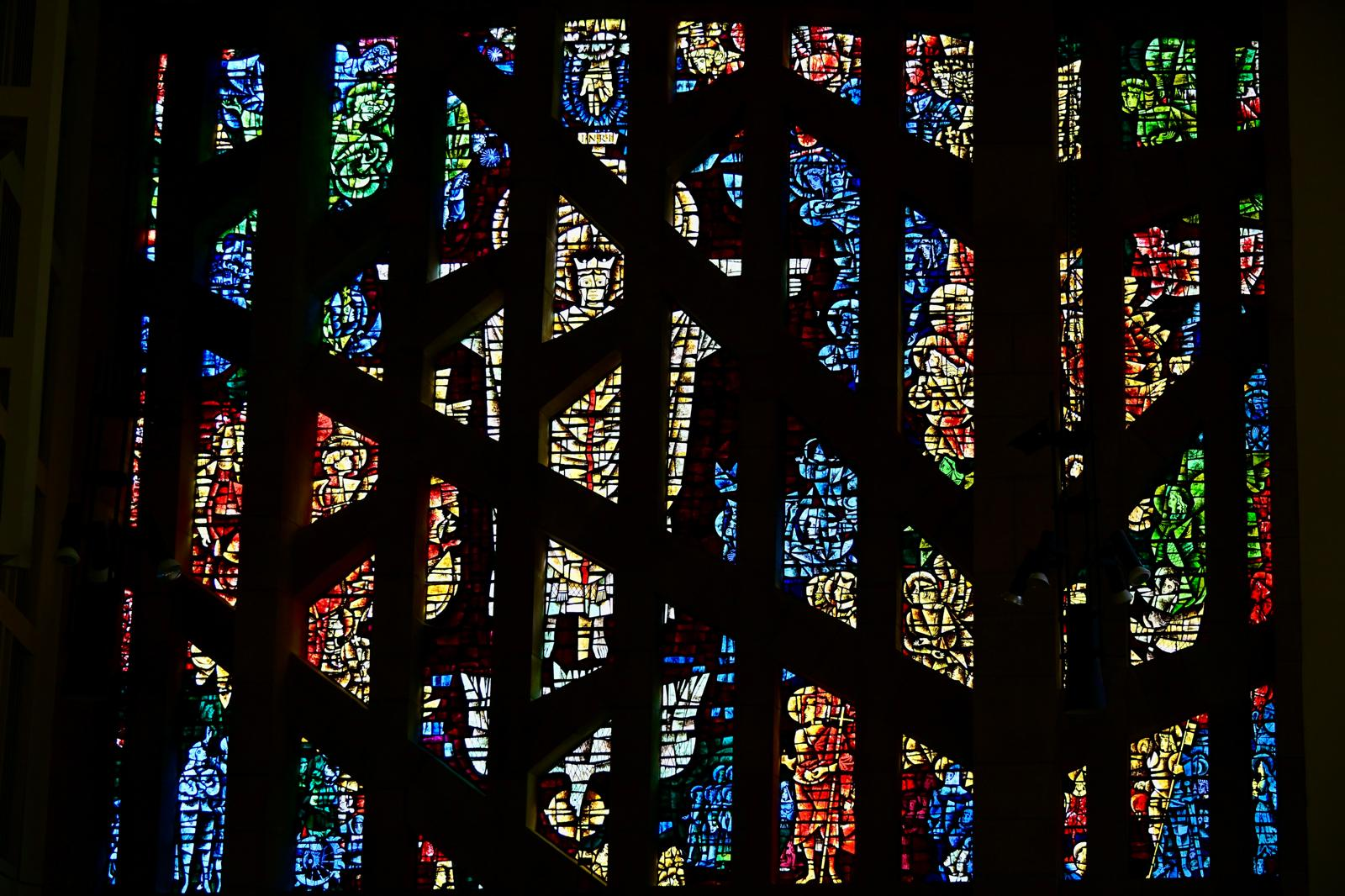
East window by Harry Stammers

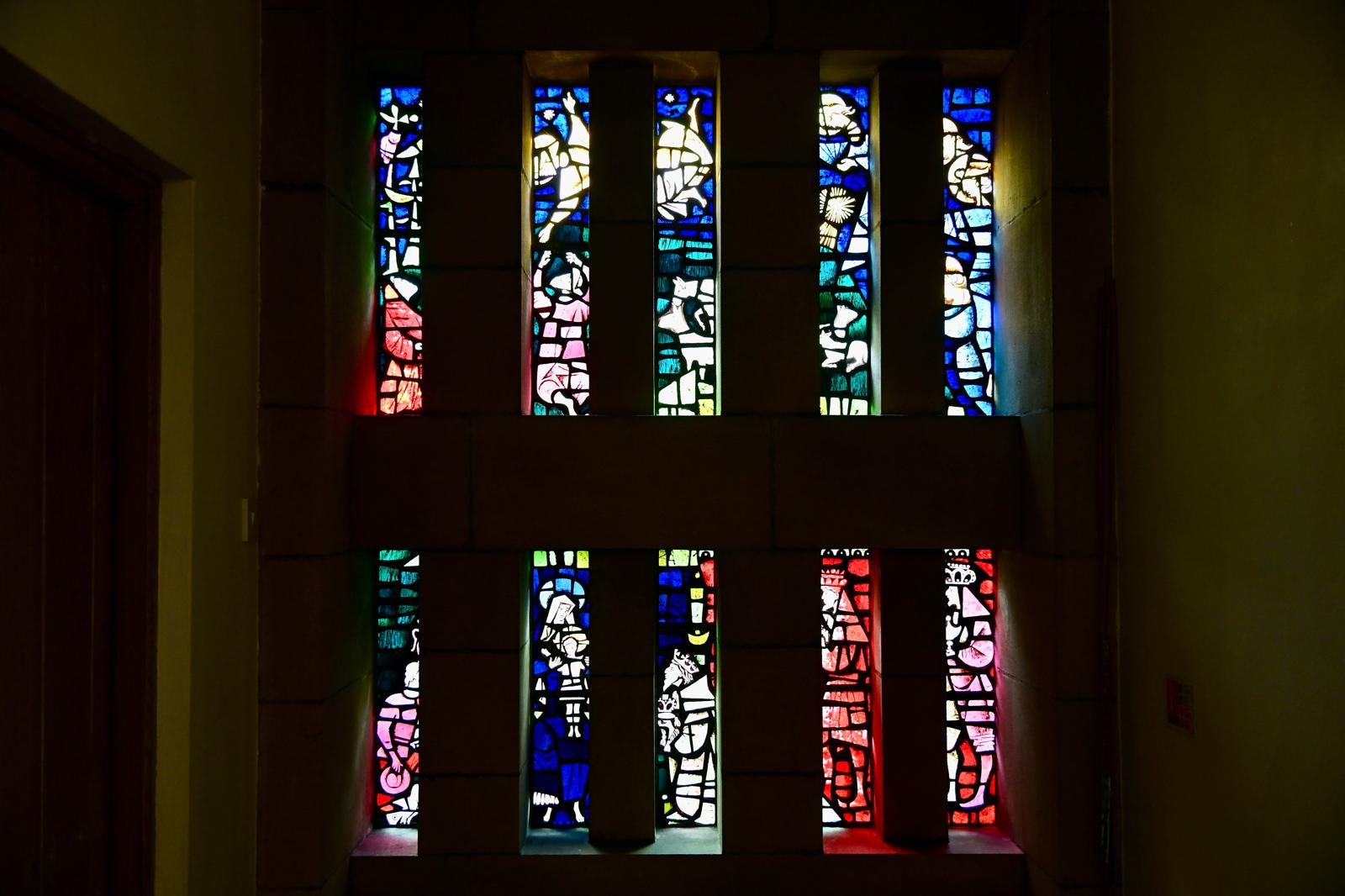
Lancet windows by Harry Stammers

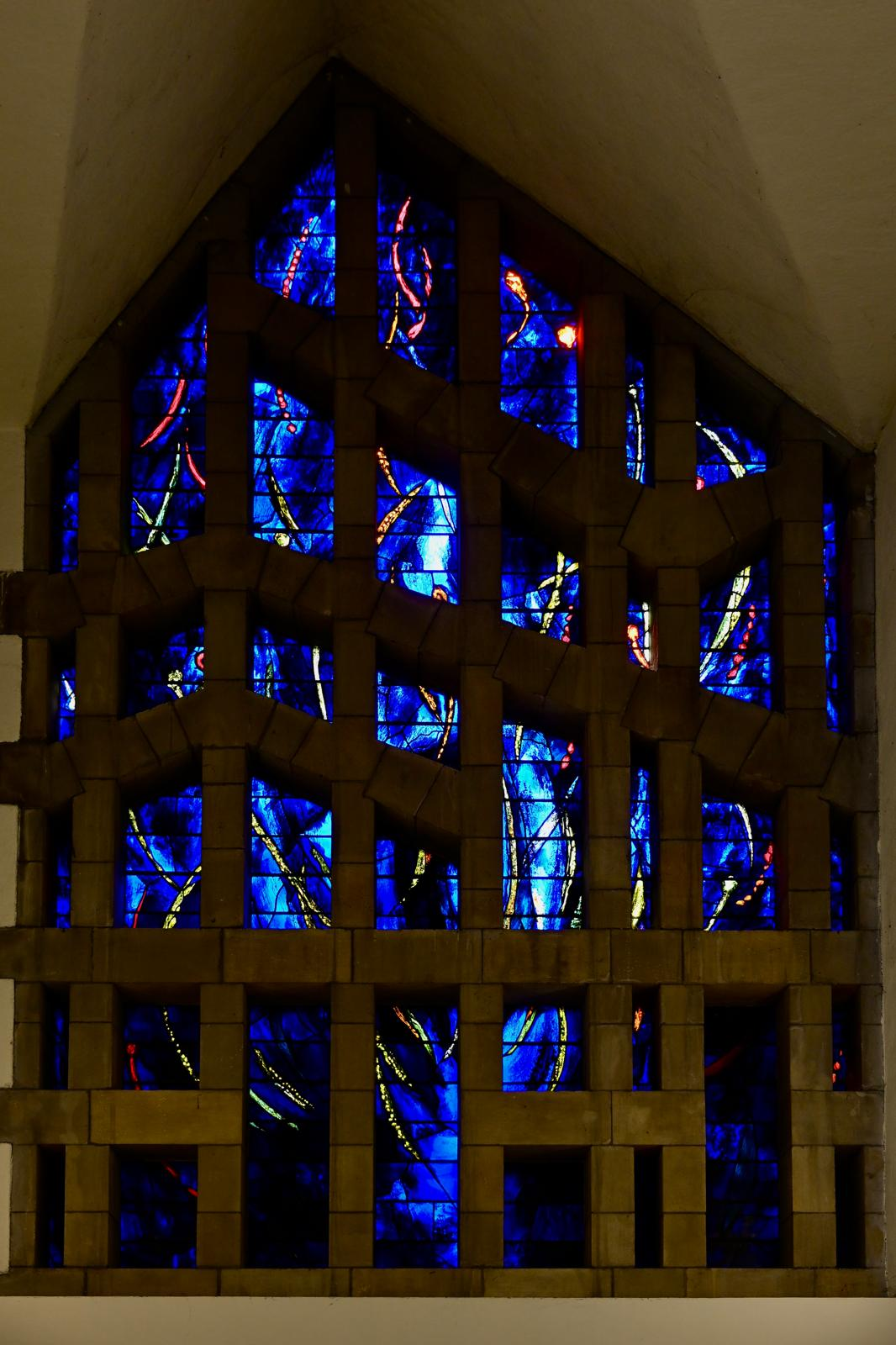
West window by John Piper

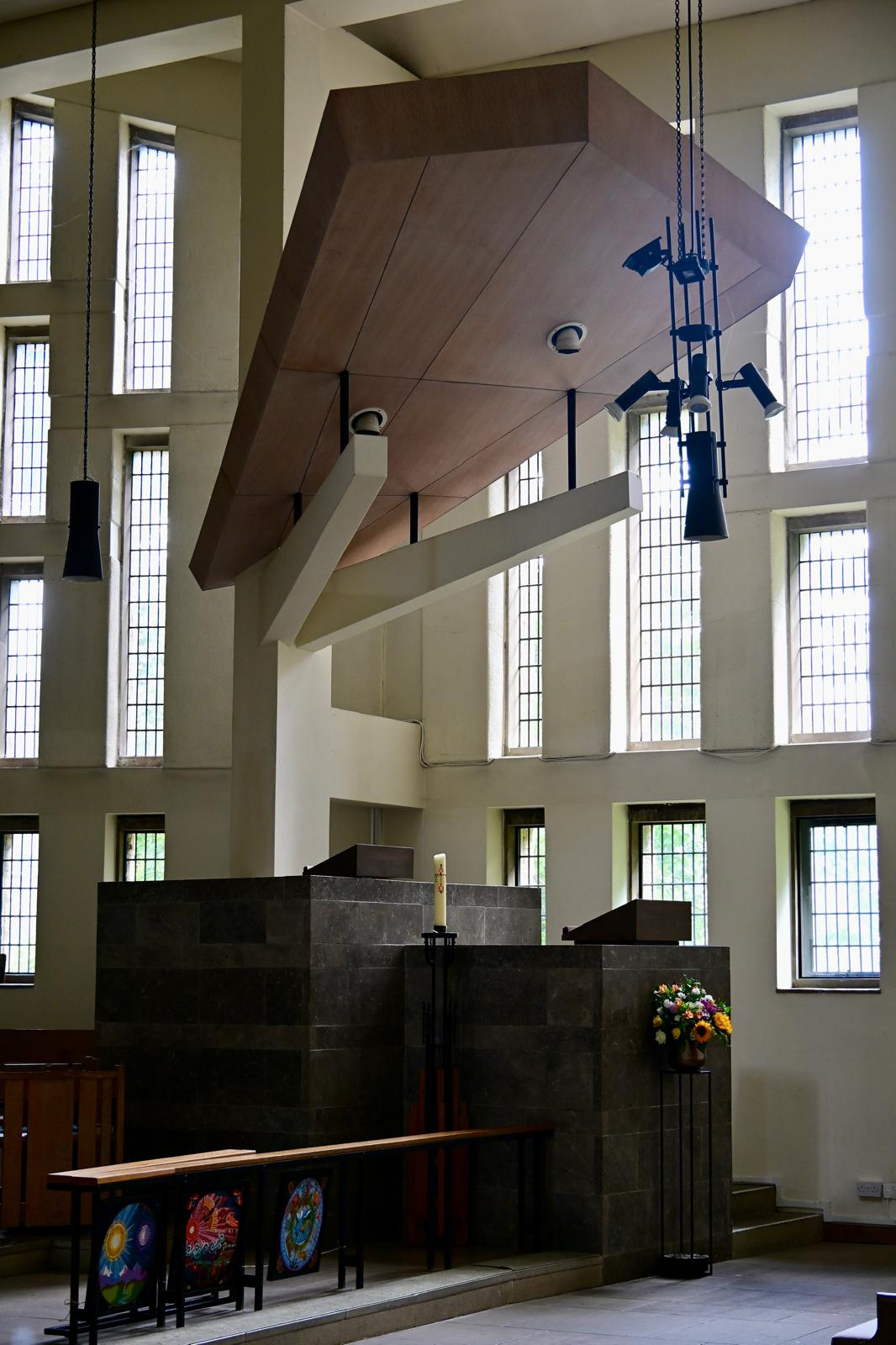
Pulpit and lectern by George Pace

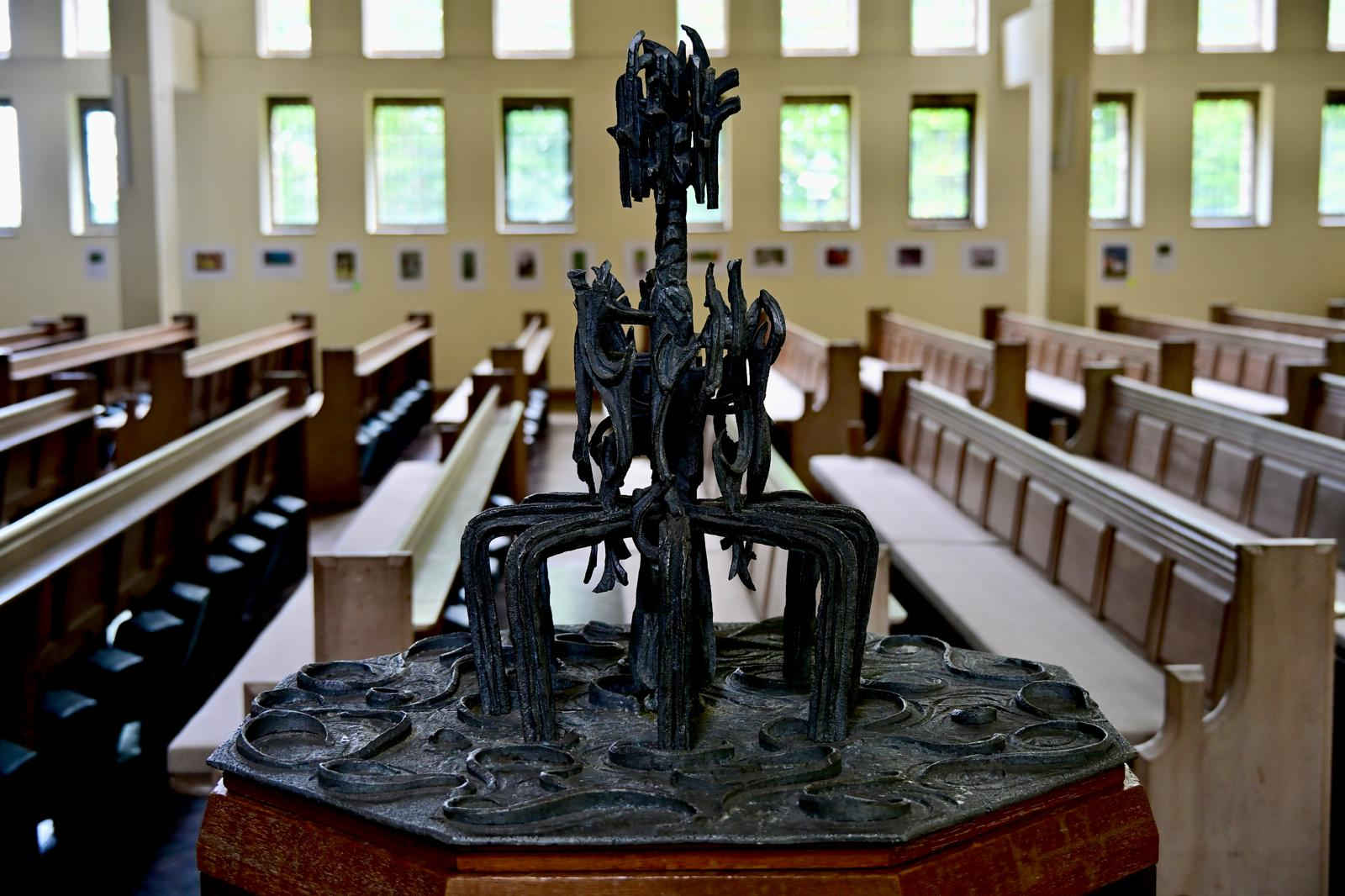
Font cover by George Pace

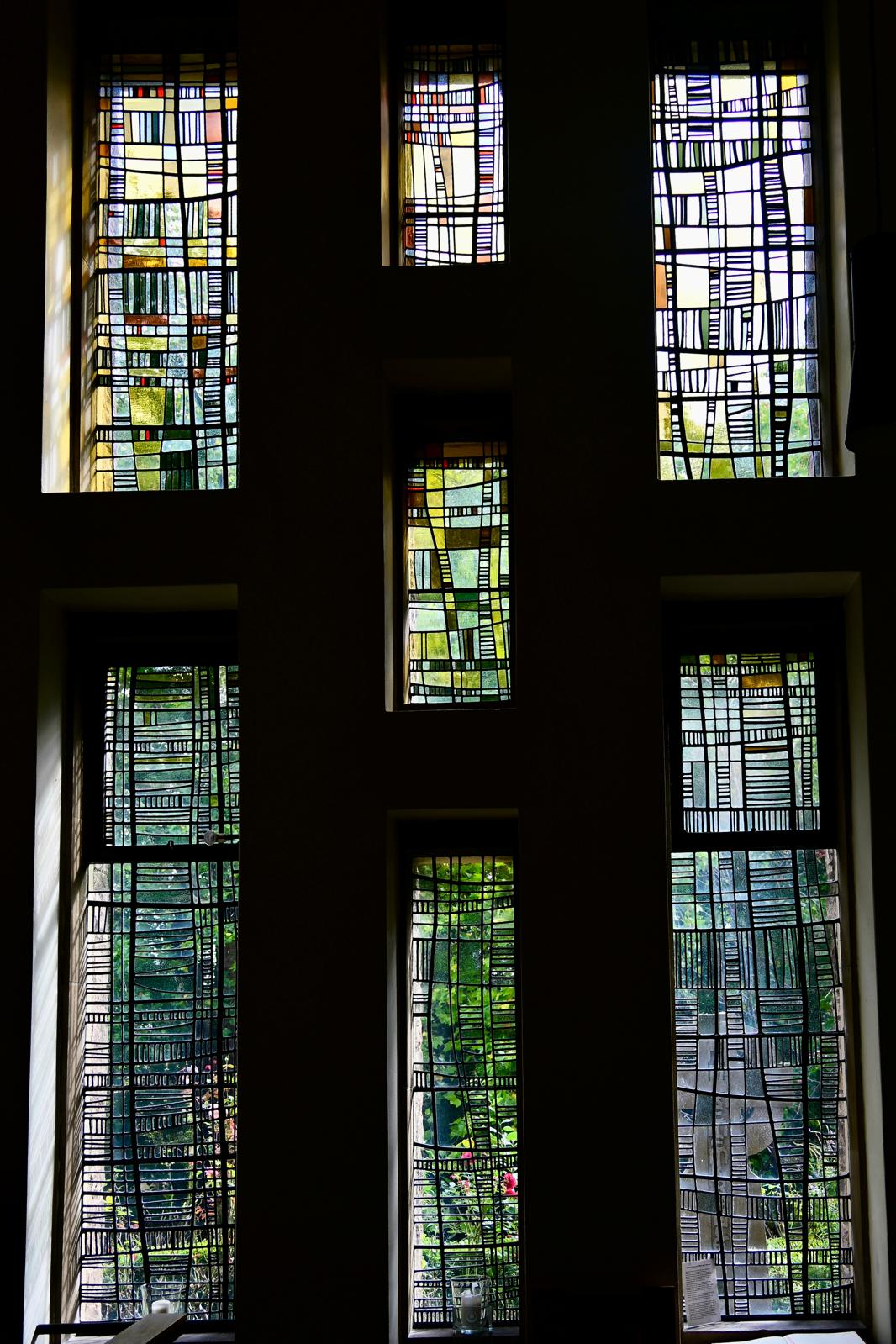
Chapel windows by Gillian Rees-Thomas
