= Architects' Journal =

British architectural magazine

- Cover of 22 August 2024 issue
- Editor: Emily Booth
- Former editors: Christine Murray
- Staff writers: Will Hurst, Richard Waite, Rob Wilson, Gino Spocchia, Fran Williams, Josh Butler
- Categories: Architecture
- Frequency: Monthly
- Founded: 1895; 131 years ago (as The Builder's Journal and Architectural Record)
- Company: EMAP Publishing Ltd (Metropolis International)
- Country: United Kingdom
- Based in: London
- Language: English
- Website: architectsjournal.co.uk
- ISSN: 0003-8466

Architects' Journal is a professional architecture magazine published monthly in London by Metropolis International. Each issue features in-depth coverage of current affairs in the sector, together with profiles of recently completed buildings. Ten times per year, the magazine is accompanied by its sister publication AJ Specification.

The Architects' Journal's website, which attracts around 8 million views annually, focuses on breaking news and hosts the publication's investigative reporting and campaigns. These include the RetroFirst initiative, which promotes the integration of sustainability principles across architectural practice.

In 2018 Architects' Journal received the Magazine of the Year award at the Professional Publishers Association Awards, and it was named Editorial Brand of the Year at the International Building Press Awards in 2020, 2021 and 2023.

== History ==
The first edition of what is now Architects' Journal was published in 1895. Originally titled The Builder's Journal and Architectural Record, it was renamed The Builder's Journal and Architectural Engineer between 1906 and 1910, and then The Architects and Builder's Journal from 1911 to 1919, before adopting its current name.

In December 2015, the title's then-owner, Top Right Group, rebranded as Ascential. In January 2017, the company announced its intention to sell 13 "heritage titles", including Architects' Journal. On 1 June 2017, it was confirmed that the titles had been acquired by Metropolis International.

== Archives ==
The Builders' Journal: An Architectural Review
- Volume 1 (February–August 1895)
- Volume 2 (August 1895–February 1896)

The Builders' Journal and Architectural Review (starting 8 July 1896)

- Volume 3 (February–August 1896)

The Builders' Journal and Architectural Record (starting 11 November 1896)

- Volume 4 (August 1896–February 1897)
- Volume 5 (February–August 1897)
- Volume 6 (August 1897–February 1898)
- Volume 7 (February–August 1898)
- Volume 8 (August 1898–February 1889)
- Volume 9 (February–August 1889)
- Volume 10 (August 1889–January 1900)
- Volume 11 (February–August 1900)
- Volume 12 (August 1900–January 1901)
- Volume 13 (February–August 1901)
- Volume 14 (August 1901–February 1902)
- Volume 15 (February–August 1902)
- Volume 16 (August 1902–February 1903)
- Volume 17 (February–July 1903)
- Volume 18 (August–December 1903)
- Volume 19 (January–June 1904)
- Volume 20 (July–December 1904)
- Volume 21 (January–June 1905)
- Volume 22 (July–December 1905)

The Builders' Journal and Architectural Engineer (starting 23 May 1906)

- Volume 23 (January–June 1906)
- Volume 24 (July–December 1906)
- Volume 25 (January–June 1907)
- Volume 26 (July–December 1907)
- Volume 27 (January–June 1908)
- Volume 28 (July–December 1908)
- Volume 29 (January–June 1909)
- Volume 30 (July–December 1909)

The Architects' & Builders' Journal

- Volume 31 (January–June 1910)
- Volume 32 (July–December 1910)
- Volume 33 (January–June 1911)
- Volume 34 (July–December 1912)
- Volume 35 (January–June 1913)
- Volume 36 (July–December 1913)
- Volume 37 (January–June 1913)
- Volume 38 (July–December 1913)
- Volume 39 (January–June 1914)
- Volume 40 (July–December 1914)
- Volume 41 (January–June 1915)
- Volume 42 (July–December 1915)
- Volume 43 (January–June 1916)
- Volume 44 (July–December 1916)
- Volume 45 (January–June 1917)
- Volume 46 (July–December 1917)
- Volume 47 (January–June 1918)
- Volume 48 (July–December 1918)

The Architects' Journal (starting 5 March 1919)

- Volume 49 (January–June 1919)
- Volume 50 (July–December 1919)
- Volume 51 (January–June 1920)
- Volume 52 (July–December 1920)
- Volume 53 (January–June 1921)
- Volume 54 (July–December 1921)
- Volume 55 (January–June 1922)
- Volume 56 (July–December 1922)
- Volume 57 (January–June 1923)
- Volume 58 (July–December 1923)

== See also ==
- List of architecture magazines
