= Stained glass in Liverpool Cathedral =

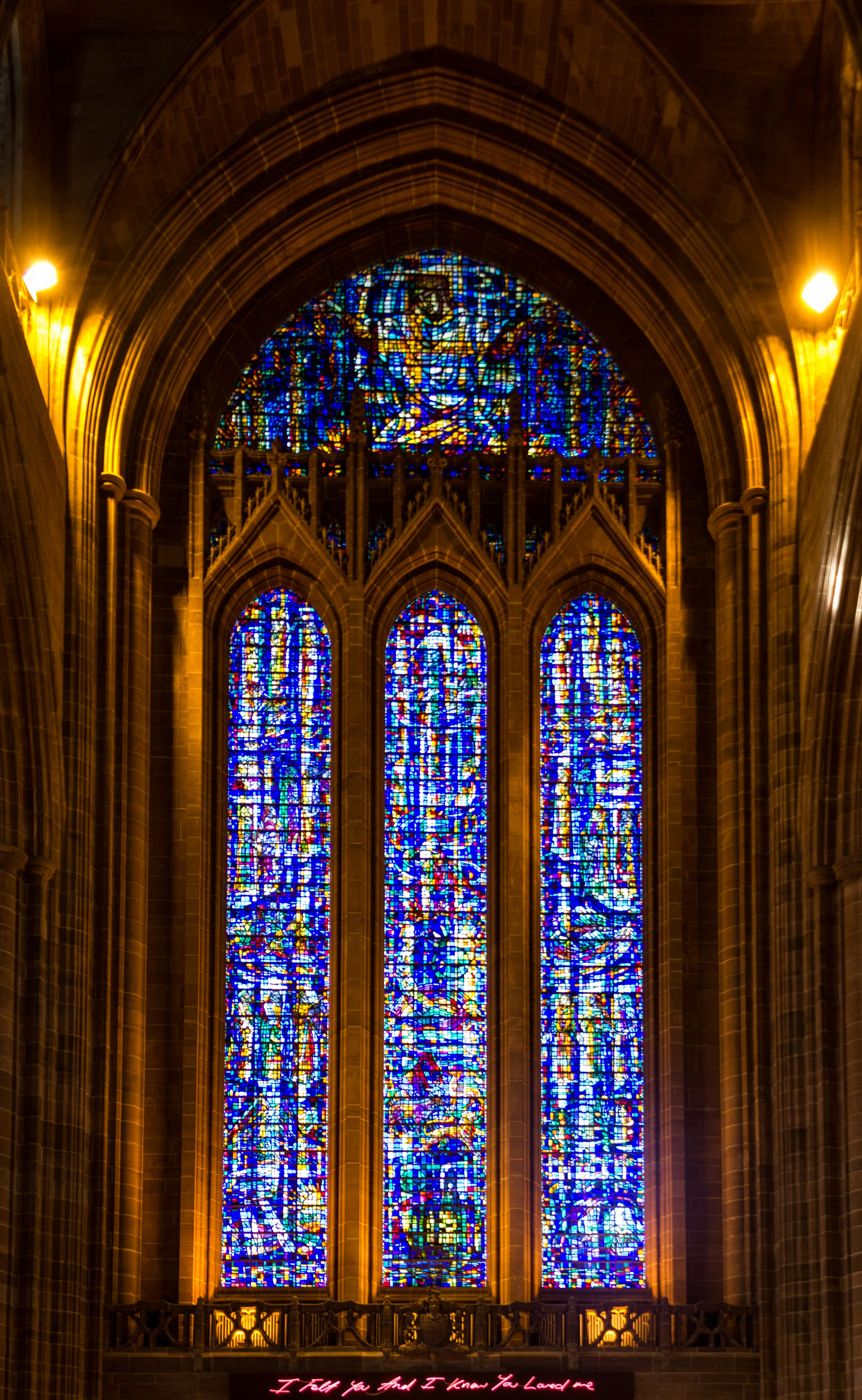
West window of Liverpool Cathedral

The stained glass in Liverpool Cathedral all dates from the 20th century. The designs were planned by a committee working in conjunction with the architect of the cathedral, Giles Gilbert Scott, with the intention of forming an integrated scheme throughout the cathedral. A number of stained glass designers were involved in the scheme, but the major contributors came from James Powell and Sons (Whitefriars Glass), in particular J. W. Brown, James Hogan, and Carl Edwards.

The subjects portrayed in the windows are numerous and diverse. They include scenes and characters from the Old and New Testaments, evangelists, church fathers, saints, and laymen, some famous, others more humble. The windows in the Lady Chapel celebrate the part that women have played in Christianity. The designs in the windows at the ends of the cathedral are based on canticles, the east window on the Te Deum laudamus, and the west window on the Benedicite. The earlier designs are dark, but the later windows are much brighter and more colourful. Much of the glass was damaged by bombing in the Second World War. The windows replacing them were based on the originals, but often using simpler and more colourful designs.

== History ==
The foundation stone of Liverpool Cathedral was laid on 19 July 1904, and it was completed in 1979. Giles Gilbert Scott won the competition to design the cathedral, and a Stained Glass Committee under the chairmanship of Sir Frederick Radcliffe was established to organise the design of the stained glass in the windows. The architect worked with the committee initially to decide on "the main lines on which the design of the window should be based and the extent to which is to be of clear glass or coloured". The committee then decided on the subjects to be depicted and, in discussion with the stained glass artist, agreed on the details of the design; Scott was concerned from the outset that "the windows should not detract from the architecture". The committee continued to work during the construction of the cathedral under a series of chairmen, whose discussions were often very detailed. The oldest windows in the cathedral are dark in colour, but with changes in manufacturing techniques from the 1930s, the later windows are much brighter and more colourful.

== Description ==
=== Lady Chapel ===
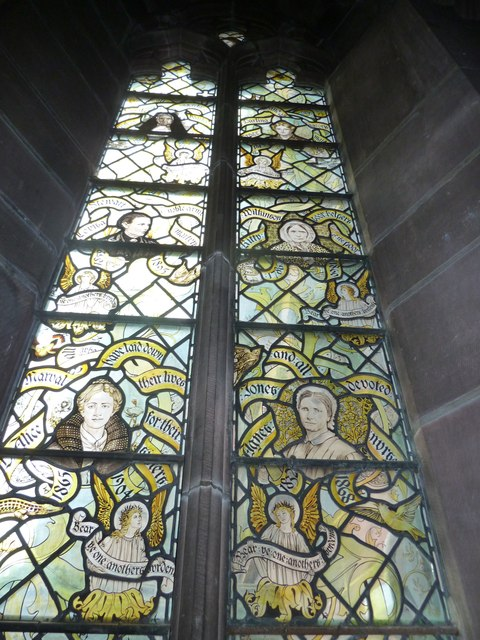
"Noble Women" window

The Lady Chapel was the earliest part of the cathedral to be built. There was a competition in 1907 to design the windows, which was won by James Powell and Sons, who commissioned J. W. Brown as designer. Brown had worked for Powell's until 1886 and then worked freelance, but from 1891 he was "the firm's preferred designer for prestigious projects". As the chapel is dedicated to St Mary, they are based on the role that women have played in the history of Christianity. Running through all the windows is a scroll containing the words of the Magnificat. On the north side are holy women from the British Isles, and on the south side are mainly saints commemorated in the Prayer Book. (Note: Liverpool Cathedral is orientated north-south, and the cardinal directions given in this article all refer to the liturgical orientation.) The Lady Chapel was damaged by bombing on 6 September 1940, and all the glass had to be replaced. The work was undertaken by James Hogan, who used simplified adaptations of the original designs. Following Hogan's death in 1948 the work was continued by Carl Edwards; the resulting windows are much brighter than the originals. The windows at the rear of the chapel and on the staircase were donated by the Girls' Friendly Society, and were designed by Brown. Known as the "Noble Women" windows, they depict women who have made major contributions to society, including Elizabeth Fry, Grace Darling, and Kitty Wilkinson.

=== Ambulatory and Chapter House ===
The four windows in the ambulatory are the only designs in the cathedral by Burlison and Grylls, each depicting two saints from a nation of the British Isles. On the steps leading to the Chapter House is the only window in the cathedral by C. E. Kempe and Company. It commemorates the Woodward family, who were local corn merchants between 1803 and 1915, and includes biblical references to corn and harvest. The Chapter House was donated by local Freemasons as a memorial to their members lost in the First World War. The windows were made by Morris & Co. and designed by Henry Dearle, reflecting the interests and traditions of the Freemasons. The windows were damaged in the Second World War and repaired by James Powell and Sons.

=== East window ===
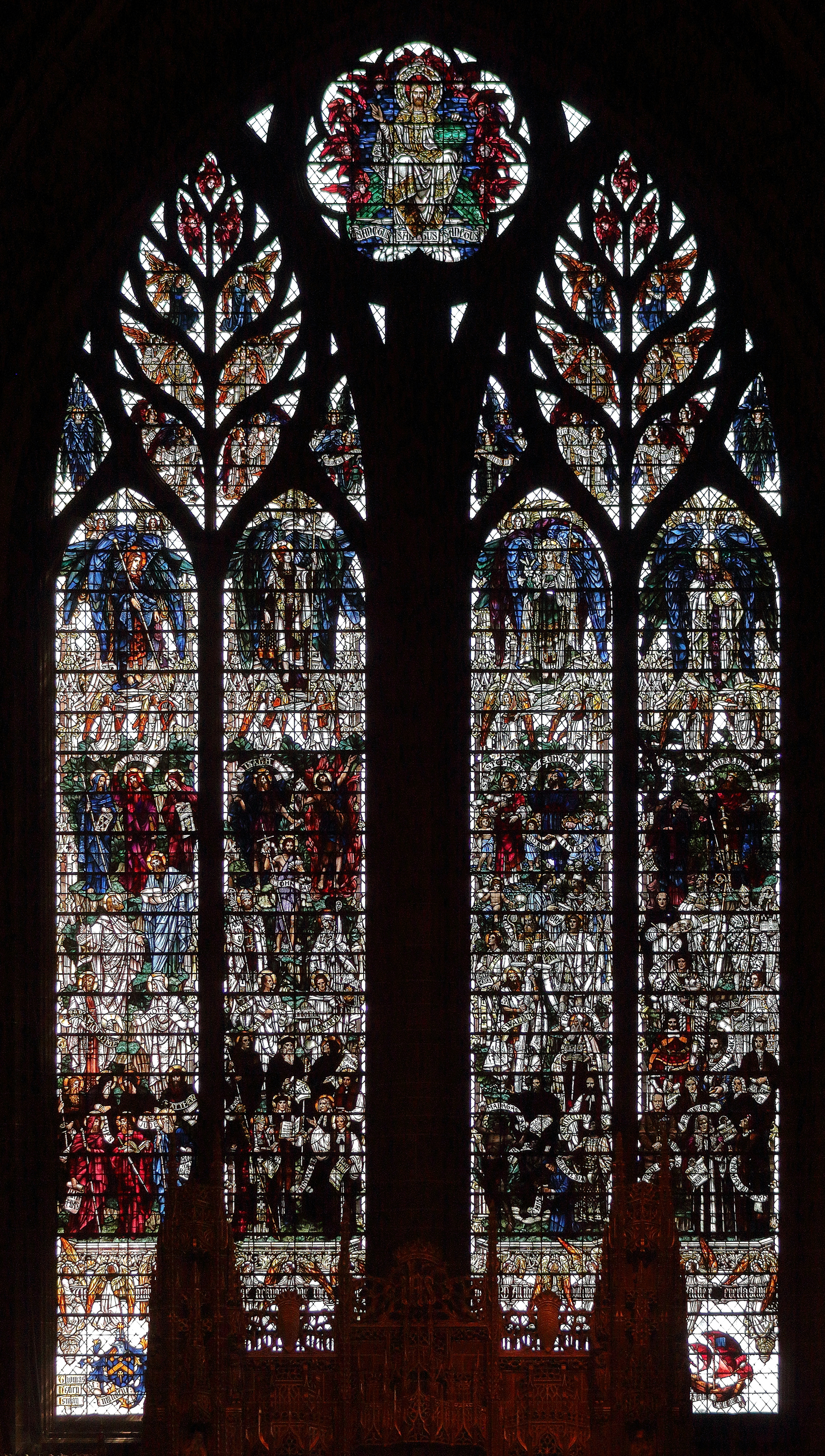
East window

The east window, designed by Brown, dominates the east end of the cathedral, rising above the reredos, and is based on the theme of the Te Deum laudamus. At the top of the window is the risen Christ, and around and below are members of the heavenly choir. Under this are four lancet windows, each representing one of the communities praising God. The left window represents 'the company of the apostles', with Saint Raphael at the top. Below are fourteen figures; the twelve apostles, excluding Judas Iscariot but including Saint Matthias, with Saint Paul and Saint Barnabas. The next window commemorates 'the goodly fellowship of the apostles'. At the top is Saint Michael, with fifteen figures below. These include Isaiah, Elijah, John the Baptist, Saint Athanasius, Saint Augustine, John Wycliffe, Thomas Cranmer, and John Wesley. The third window represents 'the noble army of martyrs', with Archangel Gabriel at the top. Below are fifteen Christian martyrs, starting with Saint Stephen. Underneath are Zechariah and the Holy Innocents, Saint Alban, Saint Oswald, and Saint Boniface. At the bottom are figures representing martyrs from Madagascar, Africa, Melanesia, and China. The lancet window on the right commemorates 'the holy church throughout all the world', with an angel, possibly Uriel, at the top. Underneath are various representations: King Alfred as a warrior, Dante as a poet, Fra Angelico as a painter, the musician J. S. Bach, the scientist Isaac Newton, and the physician Thomas Linacre. Other figures commemorate law, commerce, scholarship, and architecture. Also included are Christopher Columbus and Francis Drake.

=== Choir aisles ===
There are four main windows in the choir aisles, two on each side, and they are concerned with the four Gospels. The windows on the north side are original, but those on the south side were destroyed by bombing and were renewed. In the renewal, the central mullion of these windows was widened, and the design of the glass was simplified and made more vibrant. Each window, known by its predominant colour, shows the author of the gospel at the top with his symbol. Below are figures linked with the subject matter of the gospel. The windows on the north side are by Brown, the left window, the Sapphire window, represents Saint Matthew and shows a depiction of the Nativity on one side, and the Epiphany on the other. The 'Gold' window commemorates Saint Luke and shows the Feeding of the Five thousand, and the Raising of Jairus' daughter. The windows on the south side are by Hogan. The Ruby window represents Saint John and includes biblical scenes together with the Old Testament figures of Daniel, Ezekiel, Jonah, and Job. Saint Mark is in the Emerald window, with scenes of the Baptism of Jesus and the Transfiguration. Also included are the disciples Saint Simon and Saint Andrew, and the Old Testament figures, Noah, Zechariah, Enoch, and Malachi. At the east ends of the aisles are rose windows by Brown. The window in the north aisle relates to "journeys across the sea and undertaken in faith", namely Moses crossing the Red Sea, Saint Paul's journey to Rome, Saint Columba planting a cross on Iona, and missionaries of the Melanesian Mission landing in the Solomon Islands. The images in the rose window in the south aisle show instances of God's power being demonstrated through water, namely Noah holding a model of the ark, Jesus calming the disciples in a storm, Jesus walking on water, and Saint Paul after his shipwreck in Malta.

=== Central space ===
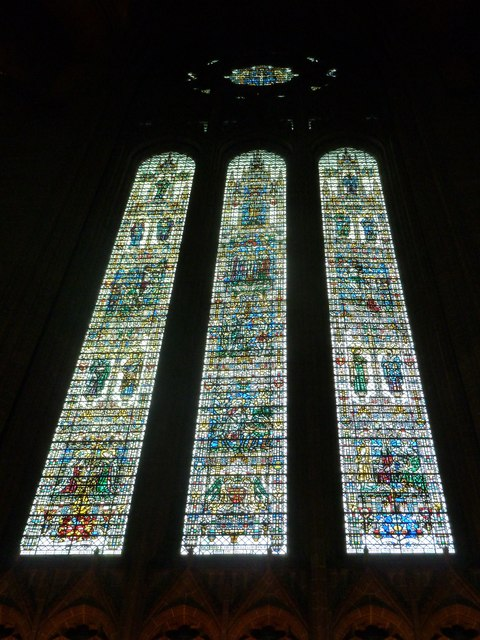
Window in the central space

The windows on the north and south sides of the central space were designed by Hogan; each includes three tall lancet windows topped by a rose window. The area of glass in each window is 1,800 square foot (170 m^{2}), the sill is 51 feet (15.5 m) above the level of the floor, and the top of the rose window is 156 feet (47.5 m) above floor level. The north window shows figures and themes from the Old Testament, with Moses with the Ten Commandments in the rose window. Below the figures include Adam and Eve, Noah, Solomon, prophets, and important characters from Israelite history. The south window depicts characters and scenes from the New Testament. The Holy Trinity is depicted in the rose window, below which are depictions of events including the Crucifixion and the Ascension, together with a variety of saints.

=== Transepts ===
The War Memorial Chapel forming the northeast transept has as its themes the aftermath of the First World War, sacrifice and the risen life. The design of its window was started by Brown and completed by Hogan. It shows suffering and death, including a depiction of the Crucifixion. The original window by Brown was destroyed by bombing; the window replacing it shows Christ with his arms outstretched in welcome at the top. Below are scenes of acts of compassion, including figures such as Saint Francis. The southwest transept forms the baptistry, and its window by Herbert Hendrie of Whitefriars depicts salvation, particularly through water and healing. The window in the northwest transept has the theme of the Church and the State.

=== Nave aisles ===
The six windows in the nave aisles deal with historical subjects, all but one designed by Carl Edwards. The exception is the west window on the south side, designed by William Wilson. This is the Bishops' Window, and includes Nicholas Ridley, Hugh Latimer, and William Temple. The middle window is the Parsons' Window, and depicts notable clergymen including Thomas Arnold (with a rugby ball), Revd Peter Green, and Revd W. Farquhar Hook. The Layman's Window includes tradesmen who worked on building the cathedral, members of the committees responsible, and a depiction of Giles Gilbert Scott. The Musicians' Window contains composers, performers, and conductors who have played a part in the development of Anglican church music. The Hymnologists' Window includes hymn writers such as C. F. Alexander and Cecil Spring Rice. (Note: Mrs Alexander wrote the words of All things bright and beautiful, and There is a green hill far away, and Cecil Spring Rice wrote I vow to thee my country.) Finally there is the Scholars' Window, with theologians, philosophers, and biblical scholars. In the corner is the Very Revd Frederick Dwelly, the first dean of the cathedral.

=== West window ===
Following Scott's death in 1960 it was decided to change the design of the west end of the cathedral, which had consisted of a small rose window and an elaborate porch. Frederick Thomas and Roger Pinkney, who had both worked with Scott, produced a simplified design that gave the opportunity for a large west window. Created by Carl Edwards and based on the theme of the Benedicite, the window consists of a round-headed window at the top, and three tall lancet windows below. It covers an area of 1,600 square foot (150 m^{2}), each lancet window being more than 52 feet (15.8 m) high. Revd Noel Vincent, the former canon treasurer of the cathedral, states that the top part of the window represents "the risen Christ in glory looking down ... in compassion on the world", and the images beneath depict "all creation united in peace".
