= John William Brown (artist) =

English artist (1842–1928)

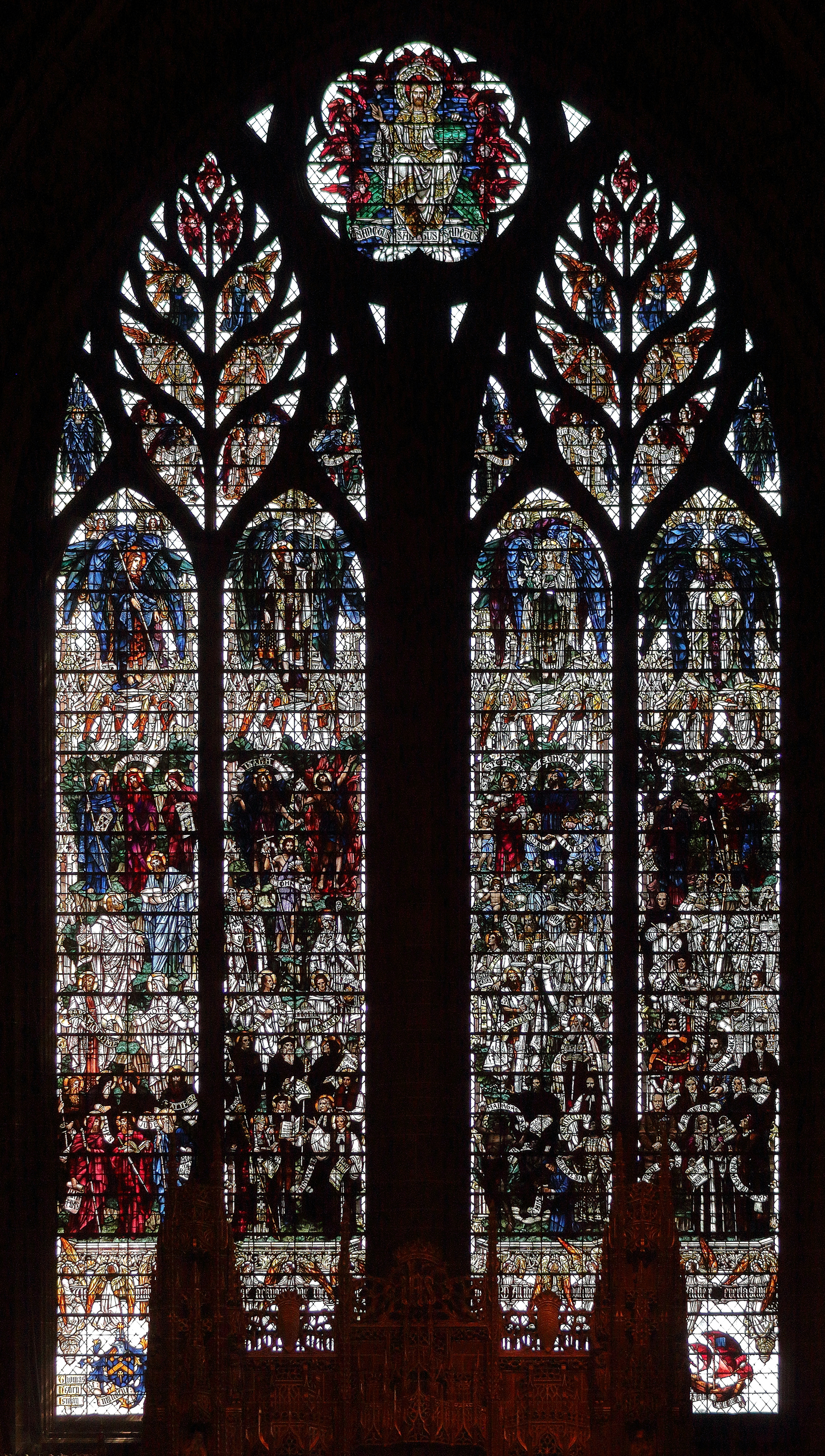
East window of Liverpool Cathedral

John William Brown (1842–1928) was an English painter and stained glass designer. He was employed by Morris & Co. and later by James Powell and Sons, before he became a freelance designer, when he continued to undertake commissions for Powell's. His major works include the Lady Chapel windows and the east window of Liverpool Cathedral.

== Biography ==
Brown was born in Newcastle upon Tyne in 1842, and he trained as an artist under William Bell Scott, a friend of William Morris. In the late 1860s he moved to London and worked with Morris & Co. In 1874 he joined James Powell and Sons where he became a stained glass designer. He was also a painter whose works were in the style of the Aesthetic movement. Brown left Powell's in 1886 to work freelance, but he continued to be their preferred designer for important projects. He continued to produce designs for Powell's up to 1923, but in the later part of his career most of his work was carried out for Henry Holiday. Towards the end of his life his eyesight deteriorated, and he died in 1928.

== Works ==
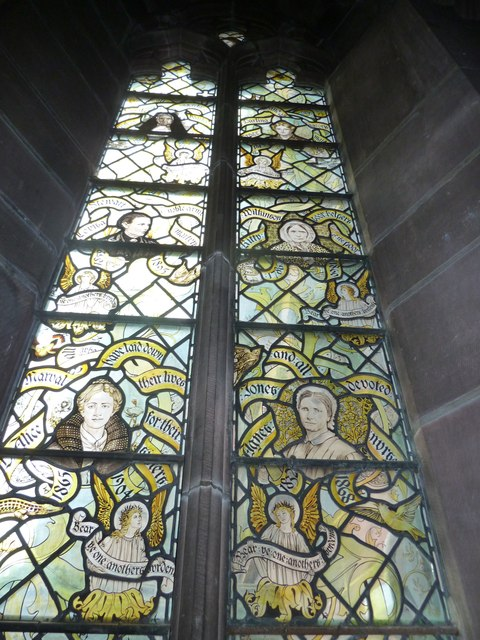
One of the 'Noble Women' windows

=== Liverpool Cathedral ===
In 1907 the competition to design the first stained glass windows for Liverpool Cathedral was won by Powell's, and Brown was commissioned to design them. The first part of the cathedral to be built was the Lady Chapel and, as the chapel was dedicated to St Mary, the designs reflect the part that women have played in the history of Christianity. On the staircase leading from the chapel to the main body of the cathedral are windows known as the 'Noble Women' windows that honour the contribution of women to society. In 1921 Brown went on to design the large east window of the cathedral, which rises above its reredos. (Note: Liverpool Cathedral is orientated north-south, and the cardinal directions given in this article all refer to the liturgical orientation.) The design of the window is based on the theme of the Te Deum laudamus, with the risen Christ at the top, and below are four windows each representing one of the communities praising God.

=== Elsewhere ===
Other designs by Brown in Northwest England include windows in Chester Cathedral (1921) and its Refectory (c. 1913), and opus sectile panels in Blackburn Museum and Art Gallery. He also designed windows in parish churches widely across England.
