= Carl Johannes Edwards =

British stained glass artist

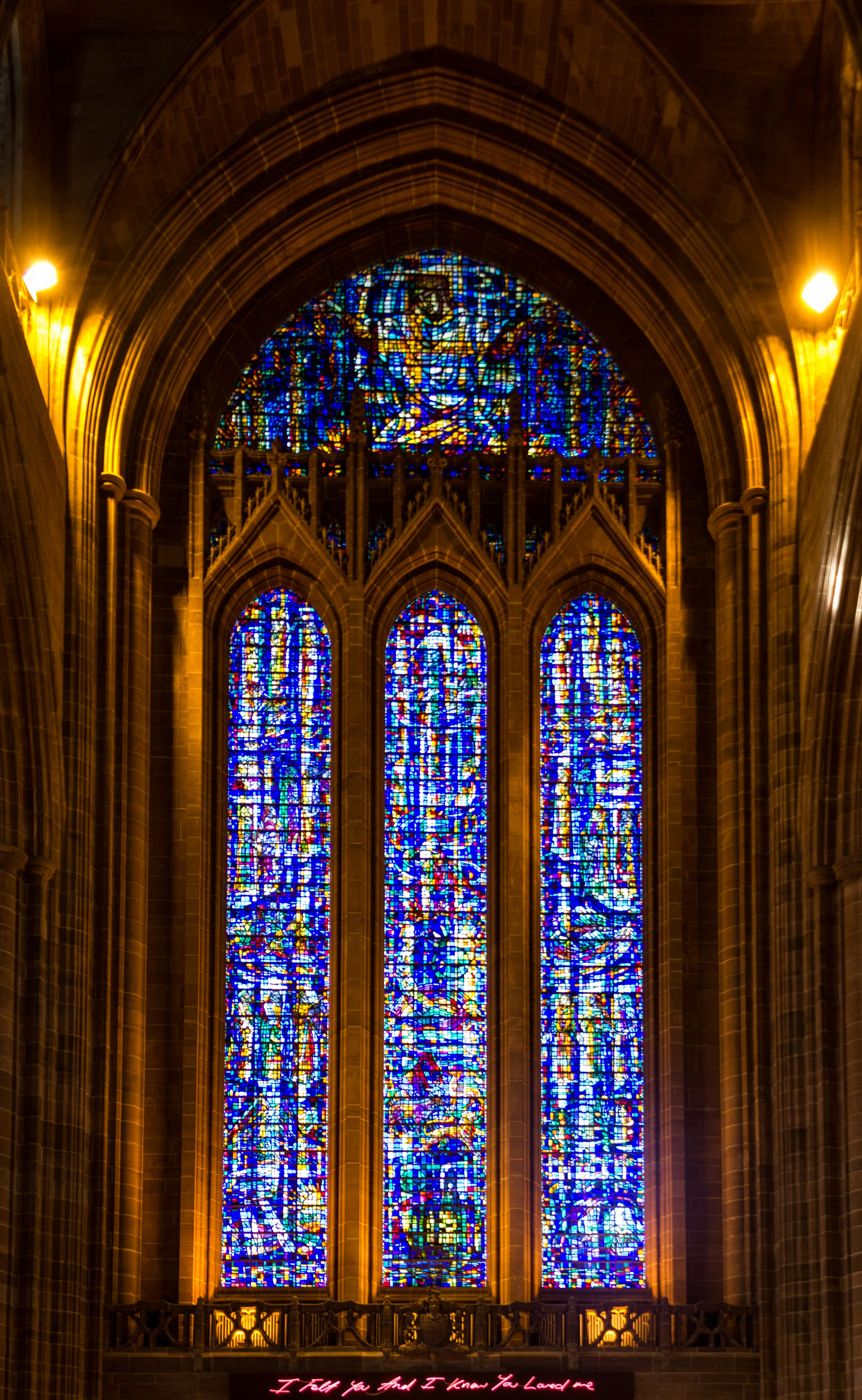
Benedicite window, Liverpool Cathedral

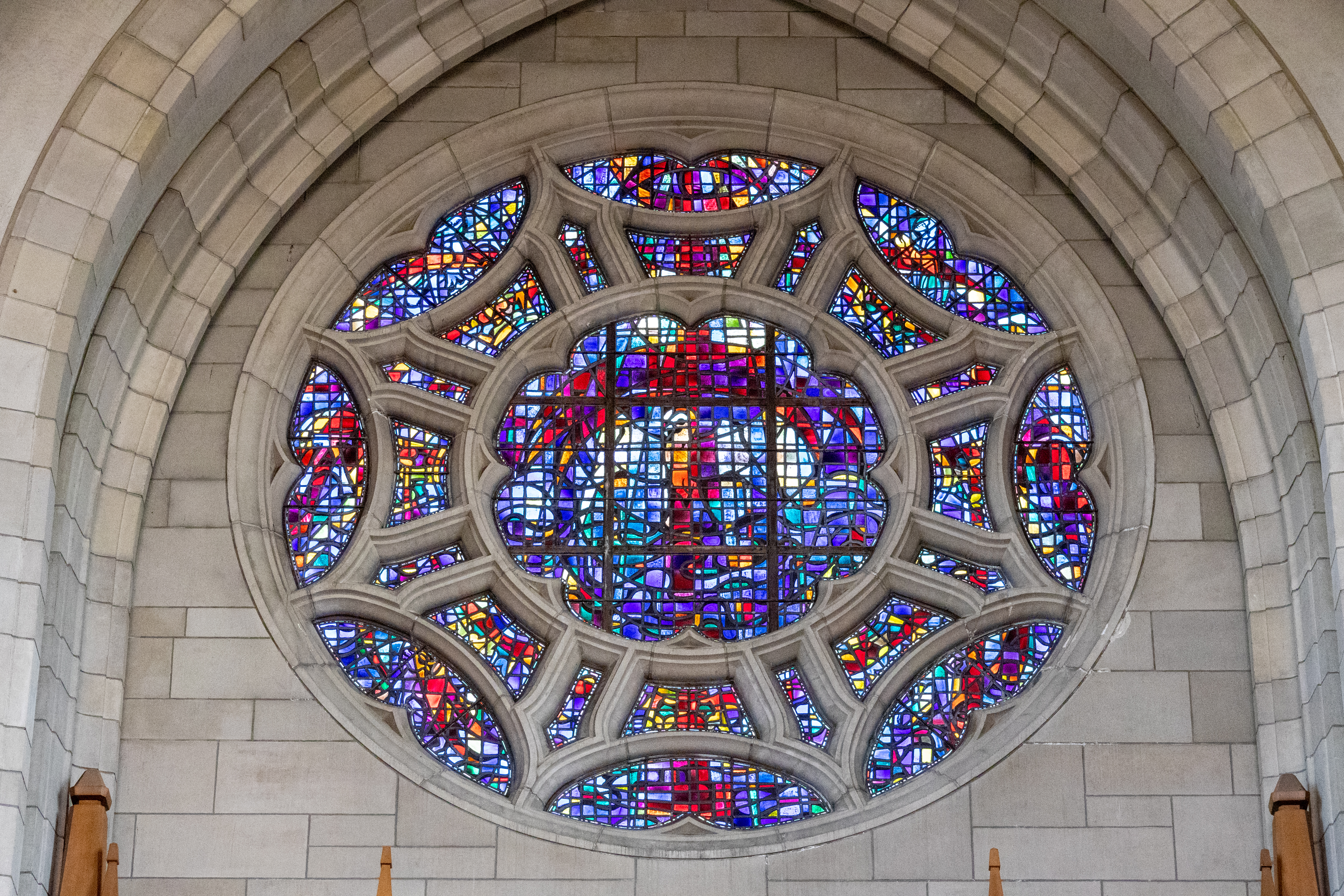
The rose window of Holy Trinity Cathedral, Auckland.

Carl Johannes Edwards (originally Kiviaho) (1914 – 1985) was an English stained glass designer. He trained at Whitefriars Glass, taking over as its chief designer following the death of James Hogan. He later established his own studio, first at the Apothecaries Hall, then at Fulham Glass House. Edwards' designs were mainly for church windows, in particular for Liverpool Cathedral.

== Biography ==
Carl Edwards was born in Marylebone, London, to Finnish parents. He joined Whitefriars Glass at the age of 14 to work in the office, and in the evenings studied architecture at Regent Street Polytechnic. Although he was a fine pianist with aspirations to make this his career, he decided instead to train as assistant to James Hogan, the chief designer at Whitefriars. In the Second World War he enlisted with the Royal Engineers, and changed his name to Edwards. After the war he returned to Whitefriars, becoming its chief designer after the death of Hogan. In 1952 Edwards went into partnership with Hugh Powell, establishing a studio in the Apothecaries Hall in London. The partnership did not last long, but Edwards continued to work at the Apothecaries' Hall until he moved to Fulham Glass House in 1972, taking over the firm of Lowndes and Drury. Edwards died in 1985.

== Works ==
During the Second World War the stained glass in the Lady Chapel of Liverpool Cathedral was damaged by bombing, and James Hogan was appointed to replace it. When he died in 1948, the work was taken over by Edwards, using the original iconography for some windows and redesigning others. He later designed other windows in the cathedral, including five of the six nave windows and, his major work in the cathedral, the Benedicite window at the west end, which covers an area of 1,600 square feet (150 m^{2}).

Elsewhere, Edwards designed the central east window in the Temple Church, London, and 40 heraldic windows for the debating chamber of the House of Lords. Most of his designs were for church windows in England and Wales, although he also carried out commissions for works in the US, Australia, and New Zealand.
