= Trompette militaire =

Organ stop

The trompette militaire is a loud majestic sounding organ stop, with brassy, penetrating tone. It is noted for its installation in Liverpool Anglican Cathedral, on the fifth manual of the Henry Willis Organ in St Paul's Cathedral, London, and in the 1968 rebuild of the organ of Exeter Cathedral. At St Paul's, the stop was a gift of Henry Willis at the time of the 1930 rebuild, the pipework being bought in from America and placed with 30 inches of wind pressure in the North East Quarter Gallery in the Dome. The Liverpool trompette militaire was the gift of Professor Alan Dronsfield and was installed in the Corona gallery, 100 ft above the cathedral floor, in 1997. Until comparatively recently, the organ of Exeter Cathedral also had a trompette militaire in the minstrels' gallery above the nave. In the most recent rebuild of the Exeter instrument the stop has been renamed simply "trompette" and has been complemented with a diapason chorus forming a nave division, all playable from the main console on the medieval screen.
