= Alice Marval =

English doctor and missionary

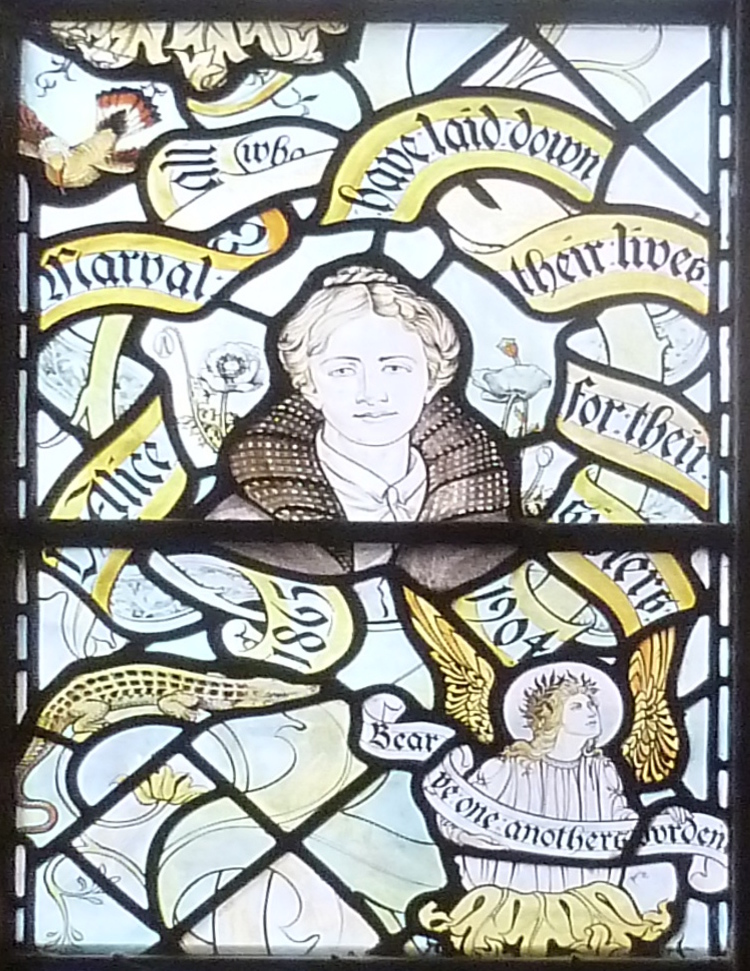
Alice Marval in a window of "Noble Women" in Liverpool Anglican Cathedral.

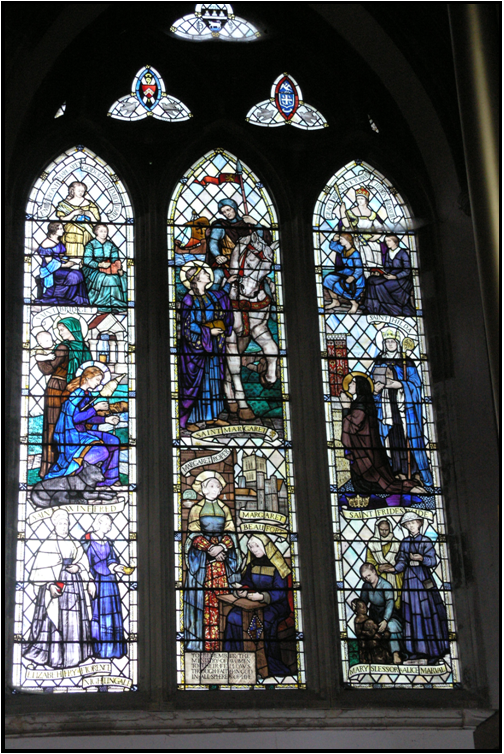
Dr Alice Marval depicted in the right panel on Dove Window in All Saints' High Wycombe

Alice Marietta Marval (26 January 1865 – 4 January 1904) popularly known as Dr. Alice Marval of Cawnpore, was an English doctor and nurse who built a hospital in India to serve women and children who were excluded from conventional medical facilities in Cawnpore (now Kanpur). She died after contracting the Plague.

== Life ==
Marval from London qualified "rather late in life" as a doctor when she was 36. After volunteering for missionary work, she was sent from England in 1899 under the Society for the Propagation of the Gospel in Foreign Parts (now United Society) to build a hospital and dispensary. St Catherine's Hospital was established to provide free services and was staffed entirely by women with the goal of serving the needs of local women and children who were being "shut out by custom from normal medical attendance."

When the Plague descended on Cawnpore, Marval tended to her patients vigilantly and in the last month of her life, she visited 246 patients. She died in 1904 after contracting the disease and was buried at Subedar Ka Talao Cemetery (now Christians Graveyard) in Cawnpore.

At St Catherine's Hospital, Marval was the second (after Edith Mary Brown) to found a nursing school for women in India. It still serves the poor and weaker sections of society in Kanpur.
