= James Humphries Hogan =

English stained glass designer

James Humphries Hogan

James Humphries Hogan RDI FSGT FRS (20 December 1883 – 12 January 1948) was an English stained glass designer with the firm of James Powell and Sons throughout his career, rising from apprentice to managing director of the company. He made stained glass for many of England's cathedrals, including the 100 feet high central windows of Liverpool Cathedral.

== Biography ==
Hogan was trained in turn at the Westminster School of Art, the Camberwell School of Arts and Crafts, and the Central School of Arts and Crafts. In January 1898, Hogan was apprenticed to Powell & Sons at the age of fourteen. He trained under Christopher Whitworth Whall (1849-1924), as well as under Powell & Sons designers William Aikman (1868-1959) and John William Brown (1842-1928). Hogan won a silver medal at the Royal Society of Arts in 1932, the same year he was elected as a Fellow.

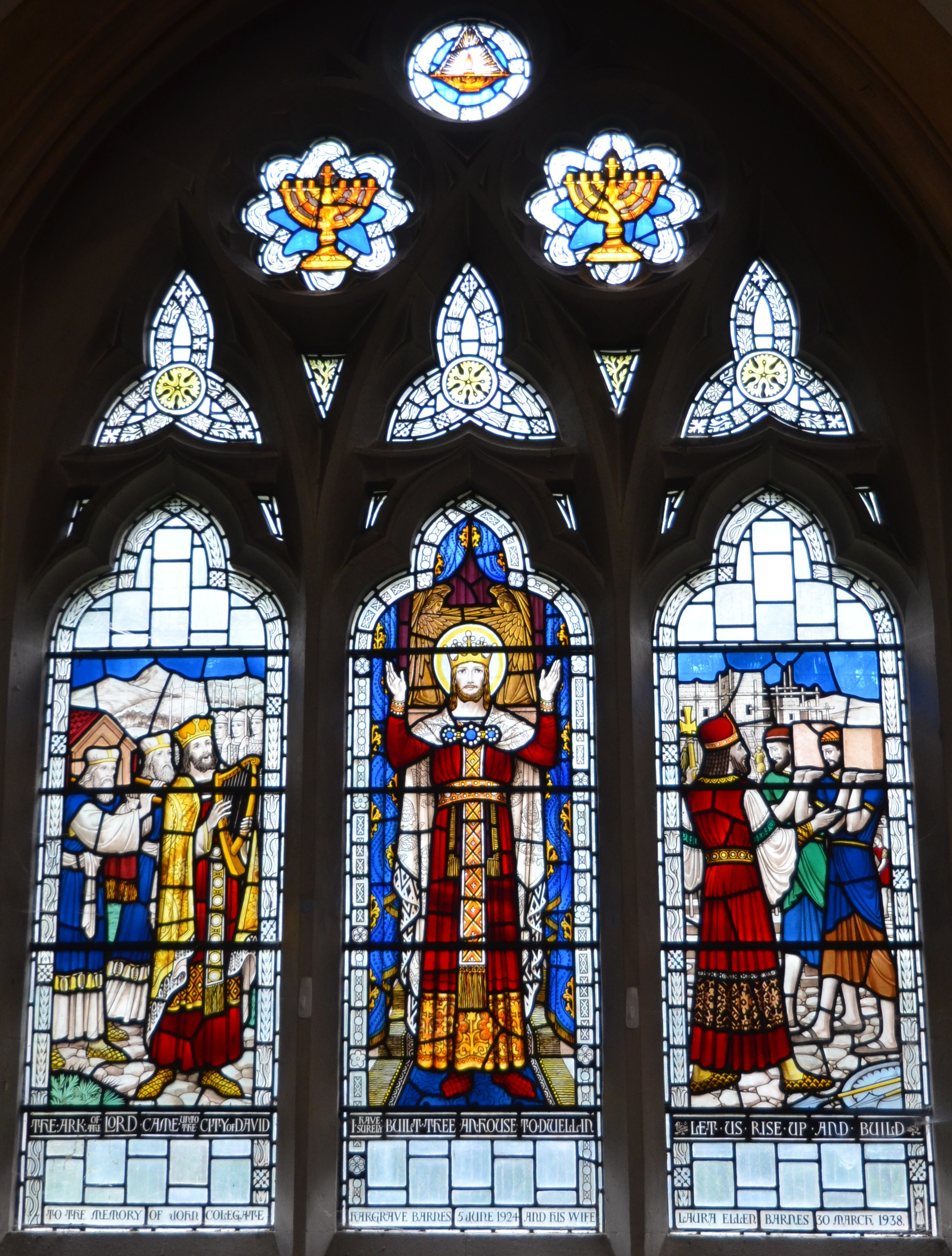
A Hogan window at St Martin's Church, Dorking

Hogan continued to work for Powell & Sons throughout his career. He worked his way up in the company, becoming Chief Designer in 1913, (succeeding William Aikman), Art Director in 1928, managing director in 1933, and finally chairman in 1946. Between 1941 and 1943, Hogan was Master of the Faculty of Royal Designers in Industry, and was elected Master of the Art Workers' Guild in 1945.

Hogan travelled throughout the United States, as primary sales agent for the firm. In the period between 1926 and 1928, he produced a ten-fold increase in the company's stained glass sales in America, effectively saving the company during difficult times. Returning from a long sales trip to the United States in late December 1947, he collapsed on 3 January 1948 and slipped into a coma. He died on 12 January 1948, without ever regaining consciousness.

== Works ==
Hogan designed windows for several cathedrals in England including Hereford Cathedral, Rochester Cathedral, Exeter Cathedral, Carlisle Cathedral and Winchester Cathedral. The finest of these are the two windows in the great central space of Liverpool Cathedral, where he collaborated with Giles Gilbert Scott, and the windows in Saint Thomas Church (New York City), which were fabricated between the World Wars. Also in Liverpool Cathedral, Hogan's glass designs were used to replace earlier Powell & Sons glass, designed by John William Brown, in the Lady Chapel. The chapel was rebuilt by Gilbert Scott to make good the damage from World War II bombing in 1940.

Hogan made stained glass windows for a number of churches in America, including seven memorial windows in Grace and Holy Trinity Cathedral in Kansas City, Missouri on the life of Christ, and most of the windows in Saint Thomas Church, Fifth Avenue, in New York City.

He also designed a set of commemorative bowls for King George V of England's silver jubilee in 1935.
