= Liverpool Cathedral =

Anglican cathedral in Liverpool, England

- Cathedral Church of Christ in Liverpool
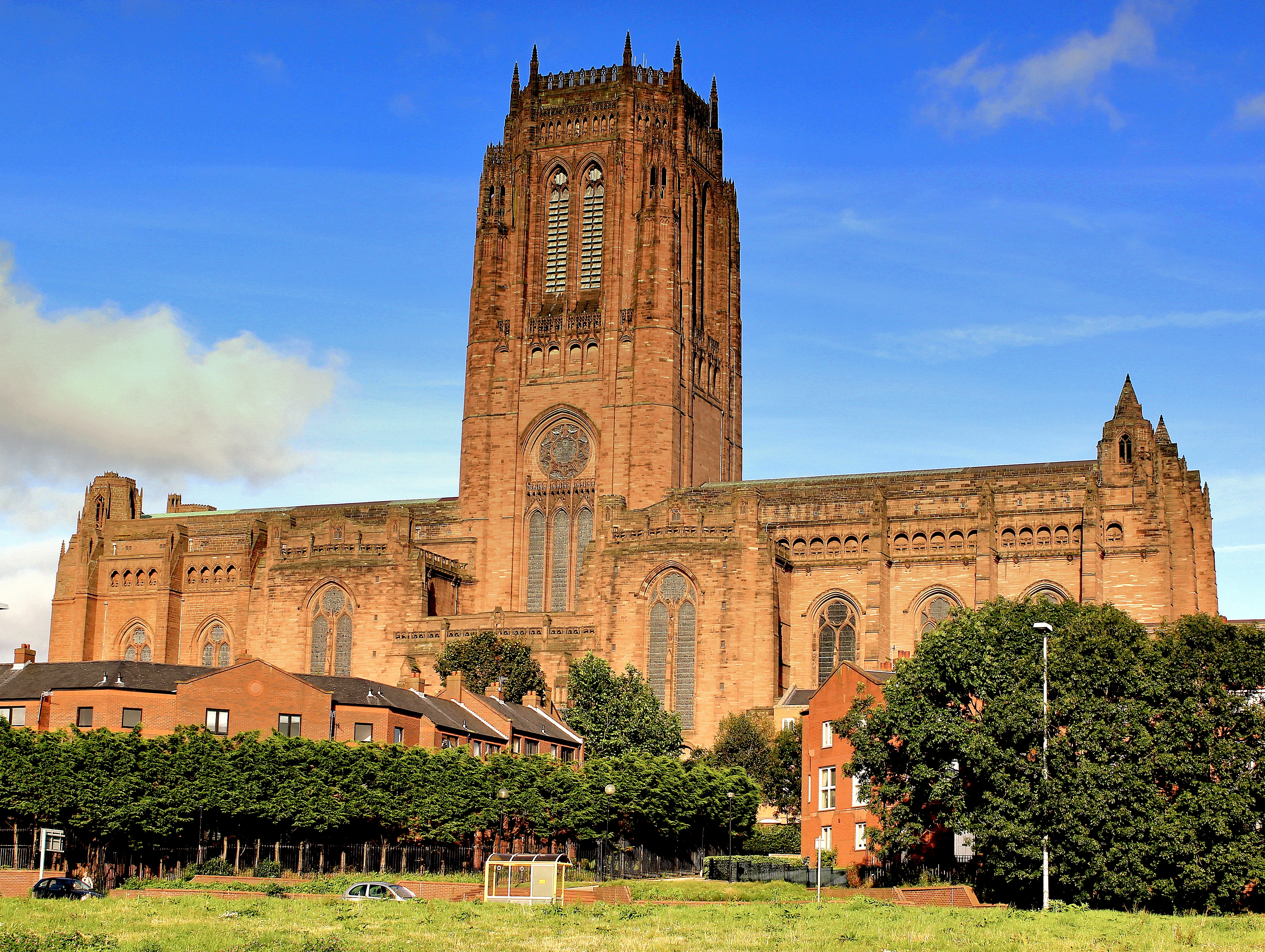
- Liverpool Anglican Cathedral, St James's Mount

- Shown within Liverpool
- 53°23′51″N 2°58′23″W
- Location: Liverpool
- Country: England
- Denomination: Church of England
- Tradition: Central churchmanship
- Website: www.liverpoolcathedral.org.uk

History
- Dedication: Christ

Architecture
- Architect: Sir Giles Gilbert Scott
- Style: Gothic Revival
- Years built: 1904–1978

Specifications
- Length: 188.67 m (619.0 ft)
- Height: 101 m (331 feet)

Administration
- Province: York
- Diocese: Liverpool

Clergy
- Bishop: Vacant / Ruth Worsley (Interim)
- Dean: Sue Jones

Liverpool Cathedral, formally the Cathedral Church of Christ in Liverpool, is a Church of England cathedral in the city of Liverpool, England. It is the seat of the Anglican Bishop of Liverpool and is the mother church of the Anglican Diocese of Liverpool. It is Britain's largest cathedral and religious building, and the eighth largest church in the world.

The cathedral is based on a design by Giles Gilbert Scott and was constructed between 1904 and 1978. It is the longest cathedral in the world: the total external length of the building, including the Lady Chapel (dedicated to the Blessed Virgin), is 621 feet (189 m), and its internal length 480 feet (150 m). In terms of overall volume, Liverpool Cathedral ranks as the fifth-largest cathedral in the world and contests the title of largest Anglican church building with the incomplete Cathedral of St. John the Divine in New York City. With a height of 331 feet (101 m) it is also one of the world's tallest non-spired church buildings and the fourth-tallest structure in the city of Liverpool. The cathedral is recorded in the National Heritage List for England as a designated Grade I listed building.

The Anglican cathedral is one of two cathedrals in the city. The Roman Catholic Metropolitan Cathedral of Christ the King is situated approximately 0.5 miles (0.8 km) to the north. The cathedrals are linked by Hope Street, which takes its name from William Hope, a local merchant whose house stood on the site now occupied by the Philharmonic Hall, and was named long before either cathedral was built.

== History ==
=== Background ===
J.C. Ryle, first Bishop of Liverpool

Francis Chavasse, second Bishop

Liverpool Cathedral Act 1885
- Act of Parliament
- Parliament of the United Kingdom
- Long title: An Act to authorise and facilitate the Erection of a Cathedral Church for the Diocese of Liverpool on the site of Saint John's Church in the parish of Liverpool, and to make other provisions relative thereto; to provide for the foundation of a Dean and Chapter of Liverpool; and for other purposes.
- Citation: 48 & 49 Vict. c. li

Dates
- Royal assent: 25 June 1885

Text of statute as originally enacted

J. C. Ryle was installed as the first Bishop of Liverpool in 1880, but the new diocese had no cathedral, merely a "pro-cathedral", the parish church of St Peter in Church Street. St Peter's was unsatisfactory; it was too small for major church events, and moreover was, in the words of the Rector of Liverpool, "ugly & hideous". The Liverpool Cathedral Act 1885 (48 & 49 Vict. c. li) authorised the building of a cathedral on the site of the existing St John's Church, adjacent to St George's Hall. A competition was held for the design, and won by William Emerson. The site proved unsuitable for the erection of a building on the scale proposed, and the scheme was abandoned.

In 1900 Francis Chavasse succeeded Ryle as Bishop, and immediately revived the project to build a cathedral. There was some opposition from among members of Chavasse's diocesan clergy, who maintained that there was no need for an expensive new cathedral. The architectural historian John Thomas argues that this reflected "a measure of factional strife between Liverpool Anglicanism's very Evangelical or Low Church tradition, and other forces detectable within the religious complexion of the new diocese." Bishop Chavasse, though himself an Evangelical, regarded the building of a great church as "a visible witness to God in the midst of a great city". He pressed ahead, and appointed a committee under William Forwood to consider all possible sites. The St John's site being ruled out, Forwood's committee identified four locations: St Peter's and St Luke's, which were, like St John's, found to be too restricted; a triangular site at the junction of London Road and Monument Place; (Note: Monument Place was later renamed Pembroke Place.) and St James's Mount. There was considerable debate about the competing merits of the two possible sites, and Forwood's committee was inclined to favour the London Road triangle. However, the cost of acquiring it was too great, and the St James's Mount site was recommended. An historian of the cathedral, Vere Cotton, wrote in 1964:

Looking back after an interval of sixty years, it is difficult to realise that any other decision was even possible. With the exception of Durham, no English cathedral is so well placed to be seen to advantage both from a distance and from its immediate vicinity. That such a site, convenient to yet withdrawn from the centre of the city … dominating the city and clearly visible from the river, should have been available is not the least of the many strokes of good fortune which have marked the history of the cathedral.

Liverpool Cathedral Act 1902
- Act of Parliament
- Parliament of the United Kingdom
- Long title: An Act to authorise the Liverpool Cathedral Committee to purchase a site for and to erect a cathedral church for the diocese of Liverpool and for other purposes.
- Citation: 2 Edw. 7. c. ccxxxi

Dates
- Royal assent: 8 August 1902

Fund-raising began, and new enabling legislation was passed by Parliament. The Liverpool Cathedral Act 1902 (2 Edw. 7. c. ccxxxi) authorised the purchase of the site and the building of a cathedral, with the proviso that as soon as any part of it opened for public worship, St Peter's Church should be demolished and its site sold to provide the endowment of the new cathedral's chapter. St Peter's place as Parish Church of Liverpool would be taken by the existing church of St Nicholas near the Pier Head. St Peter's Church closed in 1919, and was demolished in 1922.

=== 1901 competition ===
In late 1901, two well-known architects were appointed as assessors for an open competition for architects wishing to be considered for the design of the cathedral. George Frederick Bodley was a leading exponent of the Gothic Revival style, and a former pupil and relative by marriage of Sir George Gilbert Scott. Richard Norman Shaw was an eclectic architect, having begun in the Gothic style, and later favouring what his biographer Andrew Saint calls "full-blooded classical or imperial architecture".

Giles Gilbert Scott's winning design, with twin towers

Architects were invited by public advertisement to submit portfolios of their work for consideration by Bodley and Shaw. From these, the two assessors selected a first shortlist of architects to be invited to prepare drawings for the new building. It was stipulated that the designs were to be in the Gothic style. Robert Gladstone, a member of the committee to which the assessors were to report said, "There could be no question that Gothic architecture produced a more devotional effect upon the mind than any other which human skill had invented." This condition caused controversy. Reginald Blomfield and others protested at the insistence on a Gothic style, a "worn-out flirtation in antiquarianism, now relegated to the limbo of art delusions." An editorial in The Times observed, "To impose a preliminary restriction is unwise and impolitic … the committee must not hamper itself at starting with a condition which is certain to exclude many of the best men." Eventually it was agreed that the assessors would also consider "designs of a Renaissance or Classical character".

For architects, the competition was an important event; not only was it for one of the largest building projects of its time, but it was only the third opportunity to build an Anglican cathedral in England since the Reformation in the 16th century (St Paul's Cathedral being the first, rebuilt from scratch after the Great Fire of London in 1666, and Truro Cathedral being the second, begun in the 19th century). The competition attracted 103 entries, from architects including Temple Moore, Charles Rennie Mackintosh, Charles Reilly, and Austin and Paley.

In 1903, the assessors recommended a proposal submitted by the 22-year-old Giles Gilbert Scott, who was still an articled pupil working in Temple Moore's practice, and had no existing buildings to his credit. He told the assessors that so far his only major work had been to design a pipe-rack. The choice of winner was even more contentious with the Cathedral Committee when it was discovered that Scott was a Roman Catholic, (Note: At this time it was customary for architects to undertake ecclesiastical work only for the denomination to which they belonged. When Bodley's partner Thomas Garner became a Roman Catholic in 1897, the partnership was dissolved and Garner's church work was thereafter exclusively for the Roman Catholic church while Bodley worked solely on Anglican churches.) but the decision stood.

=== Scott's first design ===
Although young, Scott was steeped in ecclesiastical design and well versed in the Gothic revival style, his grandfather, Sir Gilbert Scott, and father, George Gilbert Scott, Jr., having designed numerous churches. George Bradbury, the surveyor to the Cathedral Committee, reported, "Mr. Scott seems to have inherited the architectural genius so marked in the Scott family for the last three or four generations ... He is very pleasant, agreeable, enthusiastic, tall and looks considerably older than he actually is." Appearances notwithstanding, Scott's inexperience prompted the Cathedral Committee to appoint Bodley to oversee the detailed architectural design and building work. Work began without delay. The foundation stone was laid by King Edward VII in 1904. Sir Frederick Radcliffe, known as the 'Father of the Cathedral' was chief executive of the building committee from 1913 to 1934 and supported Scott's appointment.

Cotton observes that it was generous of Bodley to enter into a working relationship with a young and untried student. Bodley had been a close friend of Scott's father, but his collaboration with the young Scott was fractious, especially after Bodley accepted commissions to design two cathedrals in the US, (Note: These were for Washington, D.C. (for American Episcopal church) and San Francisco. The latter was not built.) necessitating frequent absences from Liverpool. Scott complained that this "has made the working partnership agreement more of a farce than ever, and to tell the truth my patience with the existing state of affairs is about exhausted". Scott was on the point of resigning when Bodley died suddenly in 1907, leaving him in charge. The Cathedral Committee appointed Scott sole architect, and though it reserved the right to appoint another co-architect, it never seriously considered doing so.

=== Scott's 1910 redesign ===
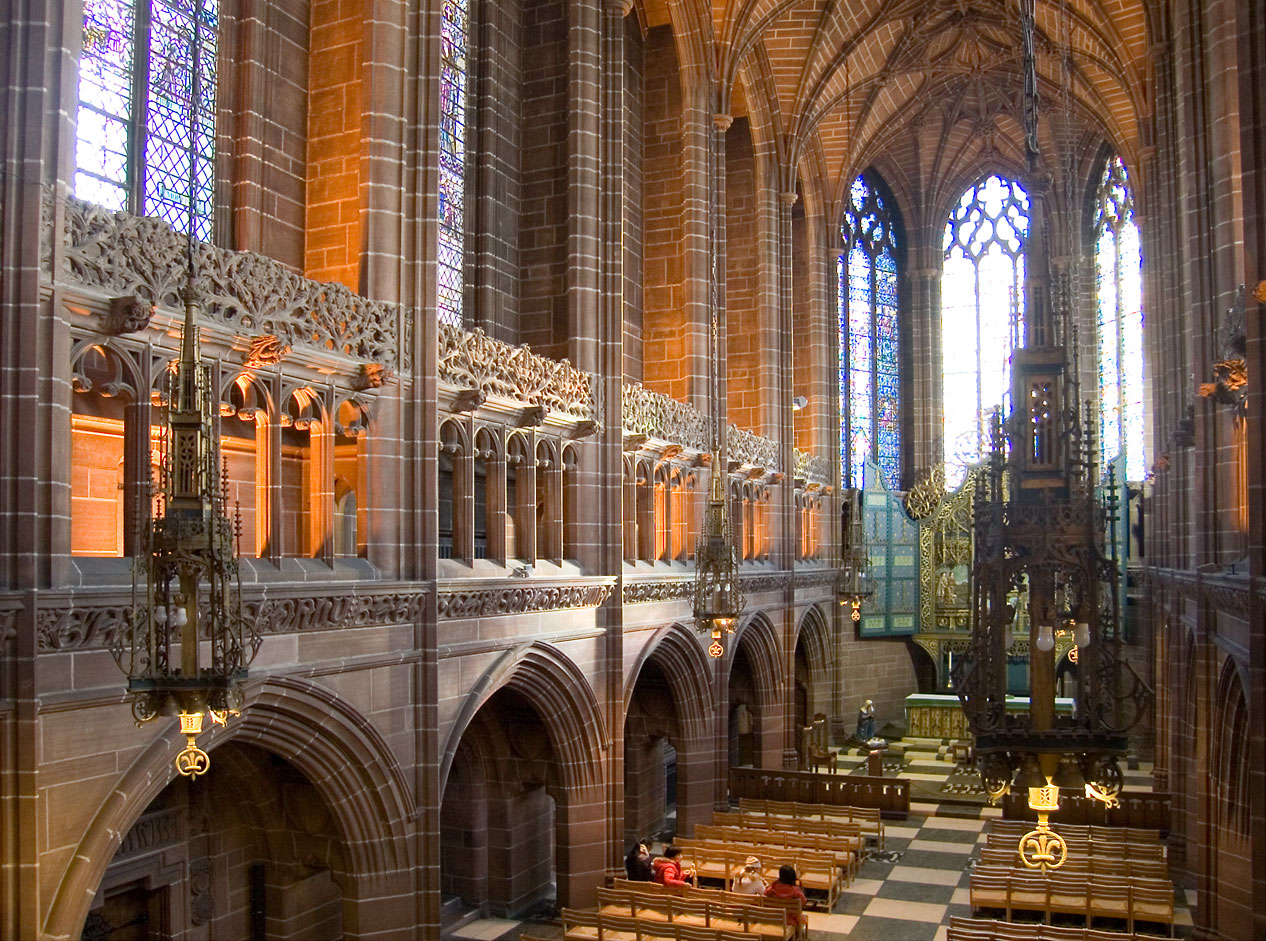
The Lady Chapel, the first part of the cathedral to be completed.

Scott's 1910 redesign, with central tower

In 1909, free of Bodley and growing in confidence, Scott submitted an entirely new design for the main body of the cathedral. His original design had two towers at the west end (Note: Because of the shape of the St James's Mount site, the cathedral is oriented nearly north to south rather than, as is traditional, west to east. Cotton and other writers use the points of the compass in their liturgical sense: thus the high altar is at the "east end", and the main entrance at the "west end.") and a single transept; the revised plan called for a single central tower 280 feet (85 m) high, topped with a lantern and flanked by twin transepts. (Note: In an article in 1977, Paul Barker suggests that Scott altered his design "to come closer to Mackintosh's plans".) The Cathedral Committee, shaken by such radical changes to the design they had approved, asked Scott to work his ideas out in fine detail and submit them for consideration. He worked on the plans for more than a year, and in November 1910, the committee approved them. In addition to the change in the exterior, Scott's new plans provided more interior space. At the same time Scott modified the decorative style, losing much of the Gothic detailing and introducing a more modern, monumental style. In the centre of the great space, directly under the central tower there is now, a dedicated geometric memorial to Scott, based on his family coat of arms, in honour of Scott.

==== The Lady Chapel ====
The Lady Chapel (originally intended to be called the Morning Chapel), the first part of the building to be completed, was consecrated in 1910 by Bishop Chavasse in the presence of two archbishops and 24 other bishops. The date, 29 June—St Peter's Day—was chosen to honour the pro-cathedral, now due to be demolished. The Manchester Guardian described the ceremony:

The Bishop of Liverpool knocked on the door with his pastoral staff, saying in a loud voice, "Open ye the gates." The doors having been flung open, the Earl of Derby, resplendent in the golden robes of the Chancellor of Liverpool University, presented Dr. Chavasse with the petition for consecration. ... The Archbishop of York, whose cross was carried before him and who was followed by two train-bearers clad in scarlet cassocks, was conducted to the sedilla and the rest of the Bishops, with the exception of Dr. Chavasse, who knelt before his episcopal chair in the sanctuary, found accommodation in the choir stalls.

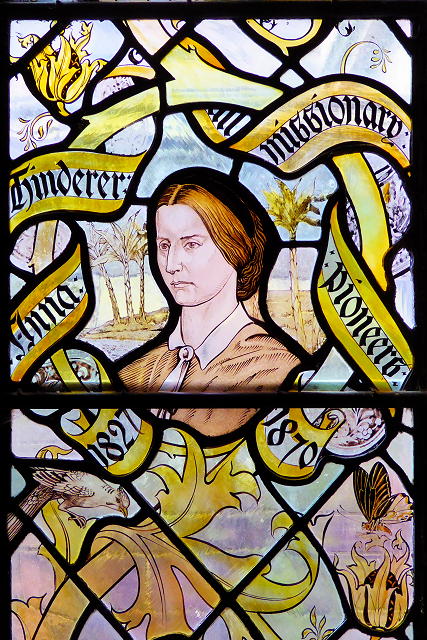
The missionary Anna Hinderer is in one of the Lady Chapel windows

The richness of the décor of the Lady Chapel may have dismayed some of Liverpool's Evangelical clergy. Thomas suggests that they were confronted with "a feminised building which lacked reference to the 'manly' and 'muscular Christian' thinking which had emerged in reaction to the earlier feminisation of religion." He adds that the building would have seemed to many to be designed for Anglo-Catholic worship.

The décor includes a stained glass featuring women of various backgrounds and professions, who are considered to have contributed significantly to society. These include:

- Theologian Julian of Norwich (1343–1416)
- Mother of Methodism Susanna Wesley (1669–1742)
- Social reformer Elizabeth Fry (1780–1845)
- Feminist and social reformer Josephine Butler (1828–1906)
- Charlotte Stanley, Countess of Derby, who led a siege during the First English Civil War (1599–1664)
- English poet Christina Rossetti (1830–1894)
- Queen Victoria (1819–1901)
- Catherine Gladstone, wife of Prime Minister William Ewart Gladstone, known for founding orphanages and her wit (1812–1900)
- Philanthropist and the wealthiest woman in England in 1837, the 1st Baroness Burdett-Coutts (1814–1906)
- Prominent figure in the Wars of the Roses and founder of two University of Cambridge colleges, Lady Margaret Beaufort (1441/3 – 1509)
- English poet Elizabeth Barrett Browning (1806–1861)
- Suffragist and first principal of Newnham College, Anne Jemima Clough (1820–1892)
- Courtier Margaret Godolphin (1652–1678)
- Anglican nun Mother Cecile (1862–1906)
- The lightkeeper's daughter who participated in the rescue of the shipwrecked Forfarshire, Grace Darling (1815–1842)
- Kitty Wilkinson (1786–1860), who opened the first public washhouse in Liverpool during a cholera epidemic
- Martyr and missionary Louisa Stewart (1852–1895), murdered in the Kucheng massacre
- Doctor and missionary Alice Marval (1865–1904)
- First trained Nursing Superintendent of Liverpool Workhouse Infirmary Agnes Jones (1832–1868)
- Missionary Anna Hinderer (1827–1870)
- Mary Ann Rogers (1855–1899), Stewardess of the Stella passenger steamboat, who gave her life to save passengers when the boat sank in 1899.

=== Second phase ===
Work was severely limited during the First World War, with a shortage of manpower, materials and donations. By 1920, the workforce had been brought back up to strength and the stone quarries at Woolton, source of the pinkish-red sandstone for most of the building, reopened. The first section of the main body of the cathedral was complete by 1924. It comprised the chancel, an ambulatory, chapter house and vestries. The section was closed with a temporary wall, and on 19 July 1924, the 20th anniversary of the laying of the foundation stone, the cathedral was consecrated in the presence of King George V and Queen Mary, and Archbishops and Bishops from around the globe. Major works ceased for a year while Scott once again revised his plans for the next section of the building: the tower, the under-tower and the central transept. The tower in his final design was higher and narrower than his 1910 conception.

From July 1925 work continued steadily, and it was hoped to complete the whole section by 1940. The outbreak of the Second World War in 1939 caused similar problems to those of the earlier war. The workforce dwindled from 266 to 35; moreover, the building was damaged by German bombs during the May Blitz. Despite these vicissitudes, the central section was complete enough by July 1941 to be handed over to the Dean and Chapter. Scott laid the last stone of the last pinnacle on the tower on 20 February 1942. No further major works were undertaken during the rest of the war. Scott produced his plans for the nave in 1942, but work on it did not begin until 1948. The bomb damage, particularly to the Lady Chapel, was not fully repaired until 1955.

=== Completion ===
Scott died in 1960. The first bay of the nave was then nearly complete, and was handed over to the Dean and Chapter in April 1961. Scott was succeeded as architect by Frederick Thomas. Thomas, who had worked with Scott for many years, drew up a new design for the west front of the cathedral. The Guardian commented, "It was an inflation beater, but totally in keeping with the spirit of the earlier work, and its crowning glory is the Benedicite Window designed by Carl Edwards and covering 1,600 sq. ft."

The version recorded in Gavin Stamp's obituary of Richard Gilbert Scott, which appeared in The Guardian on 15 July 2017, differs slightly: "When his father died the following year (1960), Richard inherited the practice and was left to complete several jobs. He continued with the great work of building Liverpool Cathedral but, after adding two bays of the nave (using cheaper materials: concrete and fibreglass), he resigned when it was proposed drastically to alter his father's design. The cathedral was eventually completed with a much simplified and diminished west end drawn out by his father's former assistant, Roger Pinckney".

The completion of the building was marked by a service of thanksgiving and dedication in October 1978, attended by Queen Elizabeth II. In the spirit of ecumenism that had been fostered in Liverpool, The Most Rev. Derek Worlock, Roman Catholic Archbishop of Liverpool, played a major part in the ceremony.

==== Funding ====
In October 2021, the building was one of 142 sites across England to receive part of a £35-million injection into the government's Culture Recovery Fund.

== Dean and chapter ==
As of 8 December 2020:

- Dean – Sue Jones (since 5 May 2018 institution)
- Canon Precentor – Vacant
- Canon Chancellor and Diocesan Director of Social Justice – Vacant
- Vice Dean and Canon for Mission and Faith Development – Neal Barnes (since 13 July 2019 installation)
- Canon Scientist – Mike Kirby (SSM; since 9 February 2020 installation)

== Completed building ==
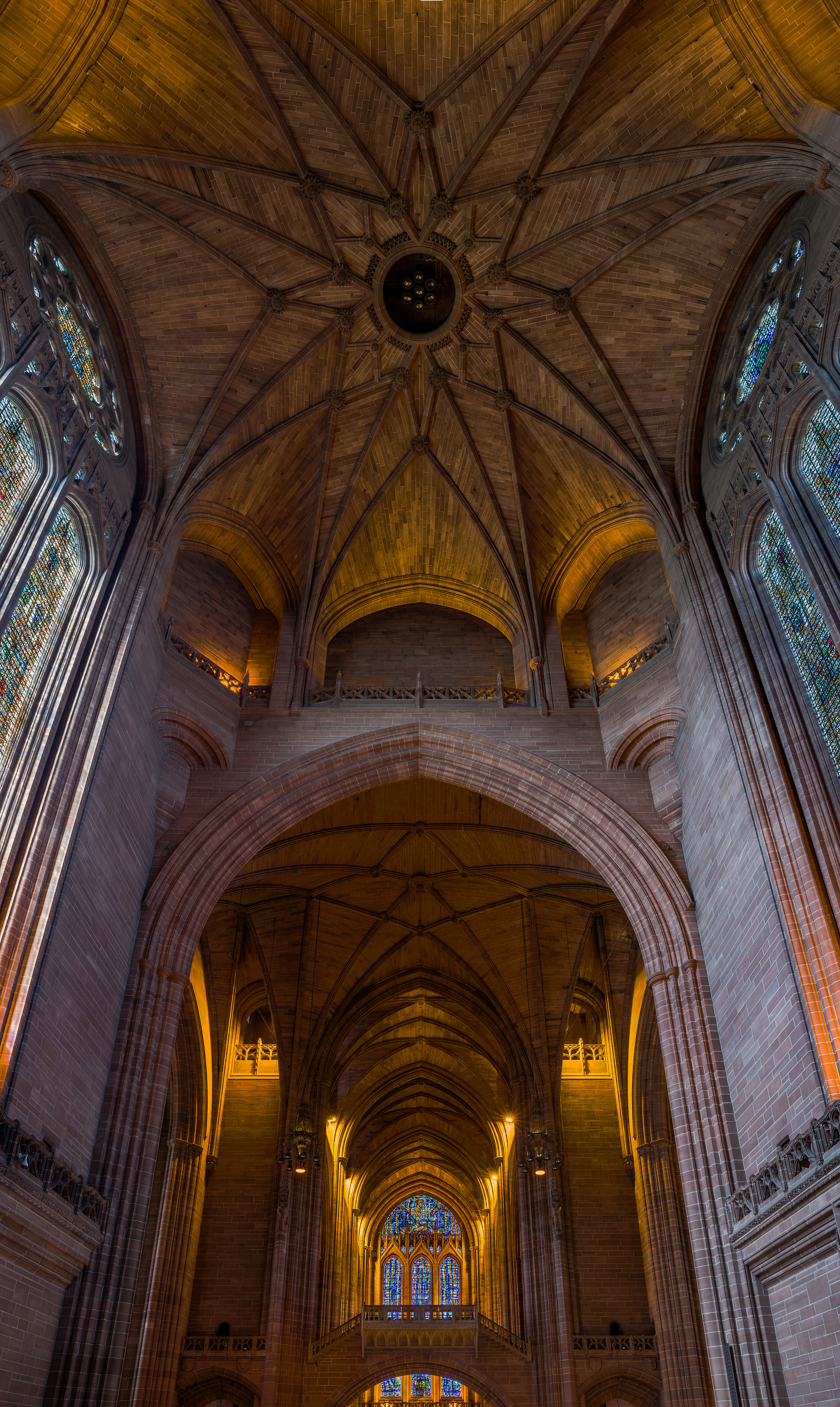
The interior of the cathedral, looking up into the vault below the central belltower.

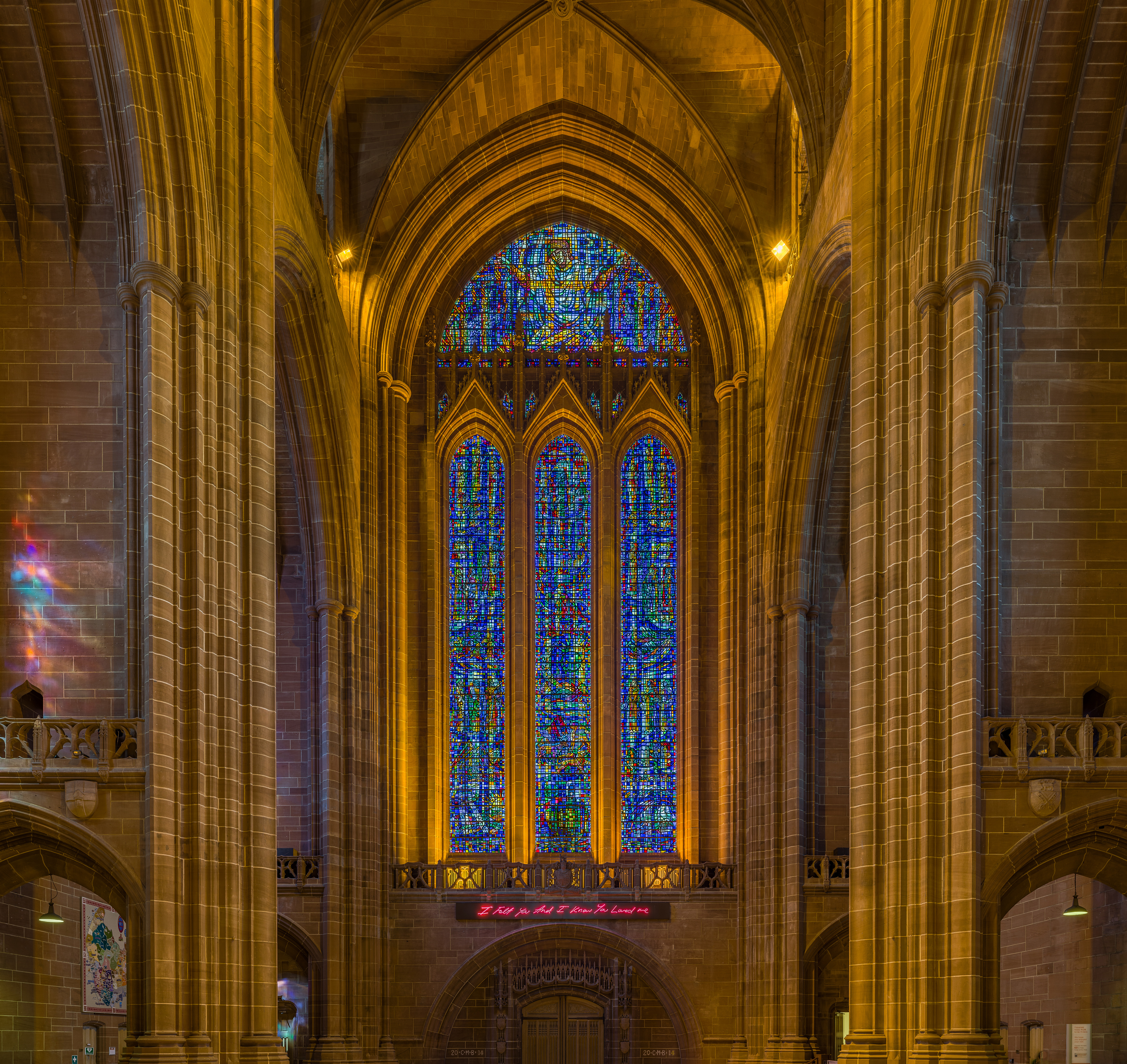
The cathedral's west window by Carl Johannes Edwards. The uppermost window is the Benedicite window. The pink neon sign by Tracey Emin reads "I felt you and I knew you loved me" and was installed in 2008 when Liverpool became European Capital of Culture.

The cathedral's official website gives the dimensions of the building as

- Length: 188.7 metres (619 ft)
- Area: 9,687.4 square metres (104,274 sq ft)
- Height of tower: 100.8 metres (331 ft)
- Choir vault: 35.3 metres (116 ft)
- Nave vault: 36.5 metres (120 ft)
- Under tower vault: 53.3 metres (175 ft)
- Tower arches: 32.6 metres (107 ft)

The cathedral was built mainly of local sandstone quarried from the South Liverpool suburb of Woolton. The last sections (The Well of the Cathedral at the west end in the 1960s and 1970s) used the closest matching sandstone that could be found from other quarries in the North West once the supply from Woolton had been exhausted.

Each of the stone blocks on the cathedral's interior has different dimensions to those next to it, said to be symbolic of God's love for individuals.

The belltower is the largest, and also one of the tallest, in the world (see List of tallest churches in the world). It houses the world's highest (67 m (220 ft)) and heaviest (16.5 long tons (16.8 tonnes)) ringing peal of bells, and the third-heaviest bell (14.5 long tons (14.7 tonnes)) in the United Kingdom.

=== Services and other uses ===
The cathedral is open daily all year round from 8:00 am to 6:00 pm (except Christmas Day, when it closes to the public at 3 pm), and regular services are held every day of the week at 8:30 am: Morning Prayer (Holy Communion on Sundays). 12:05 pm Monday–Saturday (Communion) and Monday–Friday at 5:30pm (Evensong or said Evening Prayer according to day and time of year). At the weekend, there is also a 3pm Evensong service on Saturdays and Sundays with a main Cathedral Eucharist at 10:30 am, which attracts a large core congregation each week. It also has a more intimate Communion on Sundays at 4 pm. Since early 2011, the cathedral has also offered a regular, more informal form of cafe-style worship called "Zone 2", running parallel to its main Sunday Eucharist each week and held in the lower rooms in the Giles Gilbert Scott Function Suite (formerly the Western Rooms). The core services at 5:30pm on Mondays, Tuesdays, Thursdays and Fridays, 10:30am on Sundays and 3pm Saturdays and Sundays are supported on each occasion during term time by the cathedral choir.

Following the closure of their building in Rodney Street in 1975, the Liverpool St. Andrew's congregation of the Church of Scotland used the Radcliffe Room of the cathedral for Sunday services. The congregation disbanded in November 2016.

Admission to the cathedral is free, but with a suggested donation of £5. (Note: There is a charge for those who wish take the visitor's Great Space experience, including a short film showing the construction of the cathedral, an audio tour (several different languages and a junior version available) and an opportunity to go up the tower (fee payable). The tower is closed to the visiting public during times of particularly bad or windy weather or if a special event or service prevents access.) Car parking is available on-site on a pay-on-exit basis. Parking is free for attendance at all services. Access to the main floor of the cathedral is restricted during services and some of the major events.

The building also plays host to a wide range of events and special services including concerts, academic events involving local schools, graduations, exhibitions, family activities, seminars, conferences, corporate events, commemorative services, anniversary services and many more. Its maximum capacity for any major event including special services is 3,500 standing, or about 2,300 fully seated. The ground floor of the cathedral is fully accessible.

Liverpool Cathedral has its own specialist constabulary to keep watch on an all-year 24-hour basis. The Liverpool Cathedral Constables together with the York Minster Police and several other cathedrals' constable units are members of the Cathedral Constables' Association.

Liverpool Cathedral also features on a page of the latest design of the British passport.

=== Bells ===
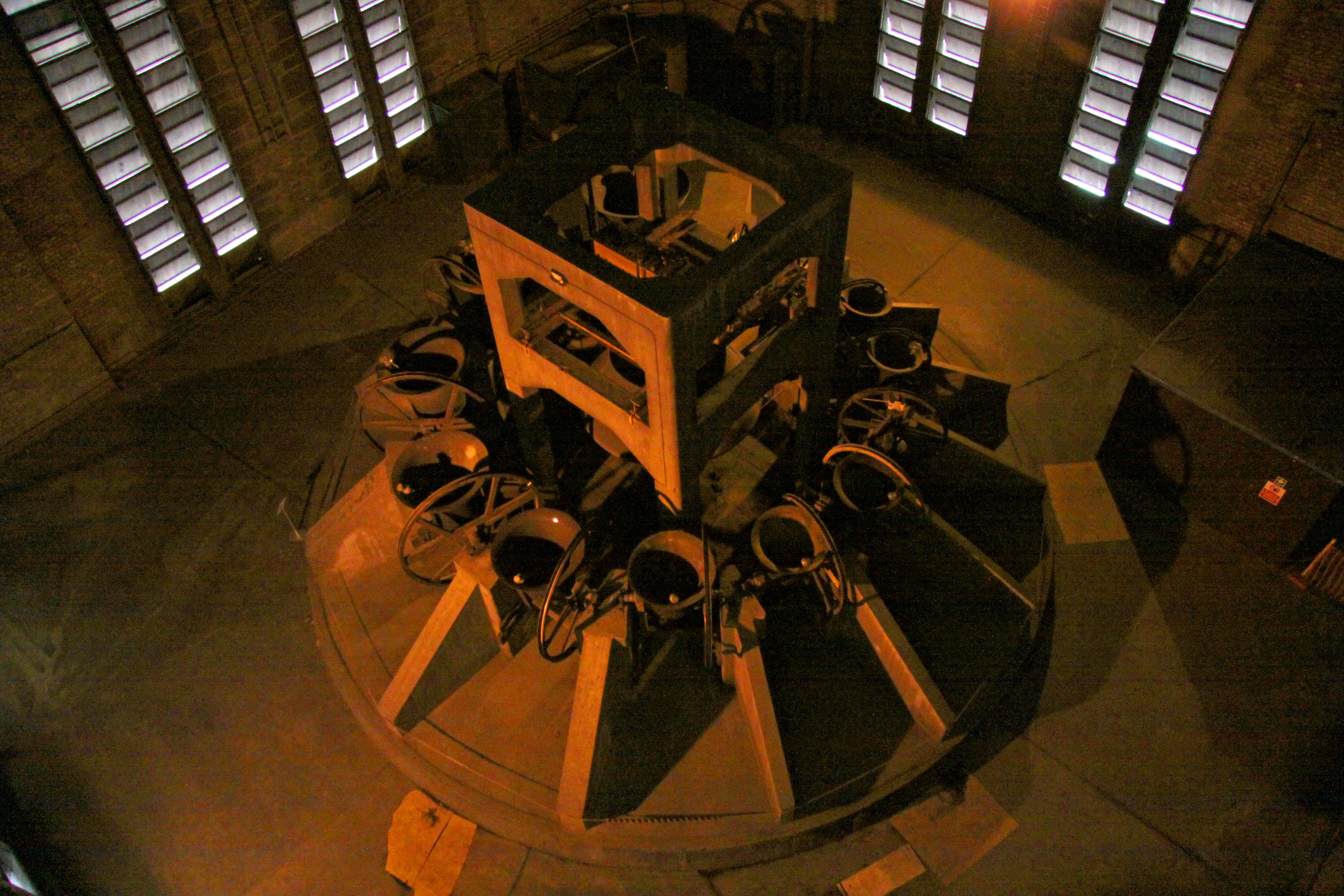
Bell chamber within the tower

At 67 m (220 ft) above floor level, the bells of Liverpool Cathedral are the highest and heaviest ringing peal in the world. (Note: At 116 short tons (105 t), the Bell of Good Luck is the largest hanging bell in the world, but it does not move; it is sounded by an external clapper. At 216 tons, the Tsar Bell is even more massive. This bell, on display on a stone pedestal on the grounds of the Moscow Kremlin, is broken. Hence, it neither hangs nor rings.) Two lifts are provided for the use of the bellringers and other visitors to the tower. The peal proper (hung for full-circle change ringing) consists of thirteen bells weighing a total of 16.5 long tons (16.8 tonnes), which are named the Bartlett Bells after Thomas Bartlett (died 4 September 1912), a native of Liverpool who bequeathed the funding. The bells vary in size and note from the comparatively light 10 long cwt (510 kilograms) treble to the tenor weighing 4 long tons (4.1 tonnes). The 13th bell (sharp 2nd) is extra to the main 12-bell peal, and its purpose is to make possible ringing in a correct octave on lighter bells. All thirteen bells were cast by Mears & Stainbank of Whitechapel in London. The initial letters of the inscriptions on the thirteen bells spell out the name "Thomas Bartlett" (from tenor to treble).

The Bartlett bells are hung in a circle around the bourdon bell "Great George". (Note: The names of the other bells are Emmanuel (tenor), James (11th), Oswald (10th), Peter (9th), Martin (8th), Nicholas (7th), Michael (6th), Guthlac (5th), Gilbert (4th), Chad (3rd), Paul (2nd), David (2nd sharp) and Bede (treble).) At 14.5 long tons (14.7 tonnes), Great George is the third most massive bell in the British Isles; only the 16.5 long tons (16.8 tonnes) "Great Paul" of St Paul's Cathedral in London, and the 2012 Olympic Bell (22.91 tonnes) are heavier. However, as the Olympic bell is never rung, Great George is currently the second largest working bell in the British Isles. Great George, cast by Taylors of Loughborough and named in memory of George V, is hung in a pendant position and is sounded by means of a counterbalanced clapper.

=== Music ===
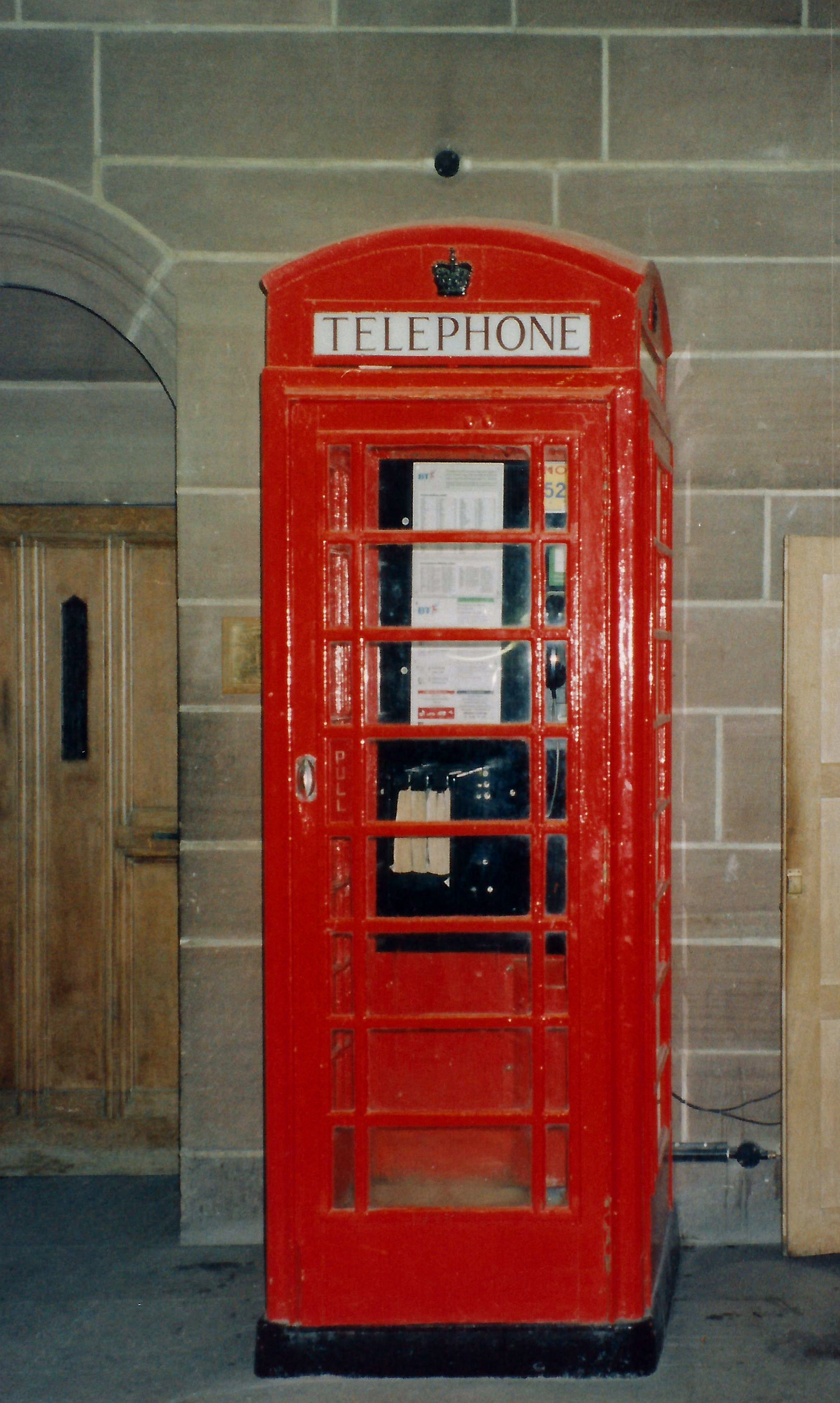
A K6 telephone box, also designed by Sir Giles Gilbert Scott, in the cathedral

Organ

The organ, built by Henry Willis & Sons, is the largest pipe organ in the UK, and one of the largest musical instruments in the world. It has two five-manual consoles (one sited high up in one of the organ cases and the other, a mobile console, on the floor of the cathedral), 10,268 pipes and a trompette militaire. There is an annual anniversary recital on the Saturday nearest to 18 October, the date of the organ's consecration. There is a separate two-manual Willis organ in the Lady Chapel.

Organists and Directors of Music

- 1880–1916 – Frederick Hampton Burstall (died 1916)
- 1916–1955 – Walter Henry Goss-Custard (Cathedral Organist)
- 1925–1948 – Edgar Cyril Robinson (Choral Conductor)
- 1948–1982 – Ronald Woan (Director of Music)
- 1955–1980 – Noel Rawsthorne (Cathedral Organist)
- 1980–present – Ian Tracey (Organist and Master of the Choristers – 1982–2008. Cathedral Organist – 2008–2026)
- 2008–2017 – David Poulter (Director of Music)
- 2017–2021 – Lee Ward (Director of Music)
- 2022–present – Stephen Mannings (Director of Music)
- 2027-present - Martyn Noble (Cathedral Organist)

Assistant/Sub-Organists

- Noel Rawsthorne 1949–1955 (afterwards organist)
- Lewis Rust (part-time) student at Liverpool Institute and ex-chorister
- Ian Tracey 1976–1980 (afterwards organist)
- Ian Wells 1980–2007
- Daniel Bishop 2010–2023
- Alexander Fishburn 2024–2025
- Joseph Ashmore 2025–present

Organ scholars

- Lewis Rust (approx dates 1960–1970)
- Ian Tracey (organist)
- Ian Wells (later, Holy Trinity, Southport)
- Geoff Williams 1983–1985 (now Director of Music, St Anne's Stanley)
- Stephen Disley (later assistant organist and director of the girls' choir, Southwark Cathedral)
- Paul Daggett
- Martin Payne 1994–1995
- David Leahey 1995–1997
- Keith Hearnshaw 1997–1998
- Michael Wynne
- Gerrard Callacher
- Daniel Bishop (afterwards Sub Organist)
- Shean Bowers 2004–2006 (later assistant director of music at Bath Abbey)
- Samuel Austin 2007–2008 (now Director of music at Pocklington School and York Oratory)
- Martyn Noble (2009–2011) Now Acting Director of Music, HM Chapel Royal, St James's Palace.
- James Speakman (2011–2012)
- Daniel Mansfield (2014–2019) Now Director of Music, Holy Trinity, Southport.
- William Jeys (2019–2020)
- Daniel Greenway – Organ Scholar (2020–2021) Now Organ Scholar, Keble College, Oxford. Organ Scholar Elect of Westminster Cathedral.
- John Zhang – Organ Scholar (2021–2022) Now Organ Scholar, St Catharine's College, Cambridge
- Matthew Breen – Organ Scholar 2021–2023 (now Assistant Director of Music, St Finbarre's Cathedral, Cork)
- Freddy Harvey – Organ Scholar 2023–2024 (now Organ Scholar, Lincoln Cathedral)
- Edward Carew – Organ Scholar 2024–2025
- Freddy Harvey – Organ Scholar 2025–2026
- James Watson – Organ Scholar 2026-2027

=== Artists and sculptors ===
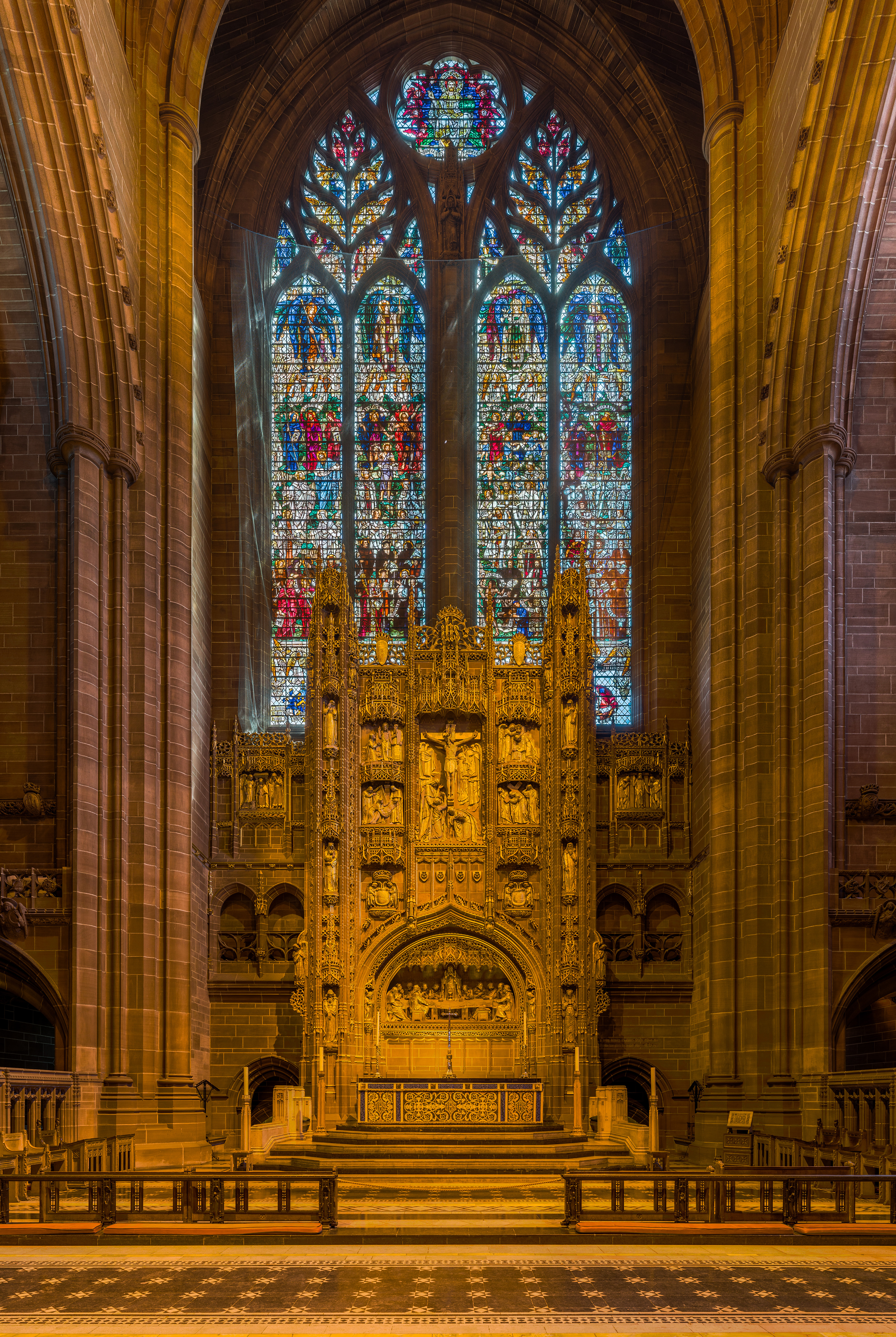
The high altar

In 1931, Scott asked Edward Carter Preston to produce a series of sculptures for Liverpool Cathedral. The project was an immense undertaking which occupied the artist for the next thirty years. The work for the cathedral included fifty sculptures, ten memorials and several reliefs. Many inscriptions in the cathedral were jointly written by Dean Dwelly and the sculptor who subsequently carved them.

To celebrate Queen Elizabeth II Silver Jubilee in 1977, Mary Farmer was commissioned to weave 6 kneelers for the Nave Altar.

In 1993, "The Welcoming Christ", a large bronze sculpture by Dame Elisabeth Frink, was installed over the outside of the west door of the cathedral. This was one of her last completed works, installed within days of her death.

In 2003, the Liverpool artist, Don McKinlay, who knew Carter Preston from his youth, was commissioned by the cathedral to model an infant Christ to accompany the 15th century Madonna by Giovanni della Robbia Madonna now situated in the Lady Chapel.

In 2008, a work entitled "For You" by Tracey Emin was installed at the west end of the cathedral below the Benedicite window. The pink neon sign reads "I felt you and I knew you loved me", and was installed when Liverpool became European Capital of Culture. The work was originally intended to be a temporary installation for one month as part of the Capital of Culture programme, but is now a permanent feature.

Another work by Emin, "The Roman Standard" takes the form of a small bronze sparrow on a metal pole, and was installed in 2005 outside the Oratory Chapel close to the west end of the cathedral. The sparrow was stolen (twice) in 2008, but on both occasions was returned and replaced.

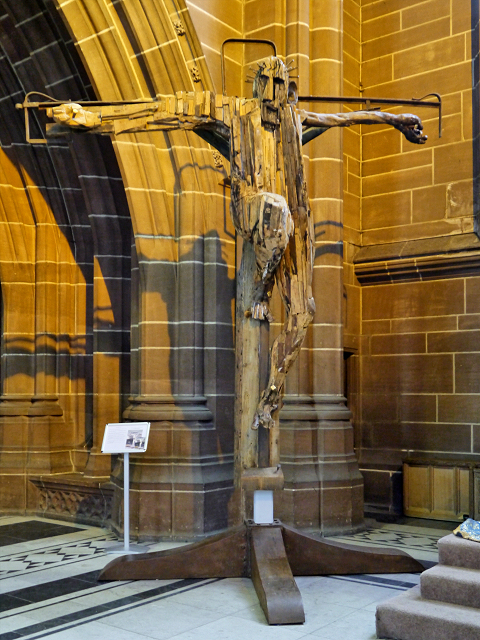
The Outraged Christ (2011) wooden sculpture by Charles Lutyens on display in the cathedral

The 15-feet high 2011 crucifixion sculpture The Outraged Christ by Charles Lutyens is on permanent display in the cathedral.

Cefyn Burgess was commissioned around 2018 to design and weave new fabrics for the cathedral based on the songs of Solomon including altar cloths and kneelers.

In 2024, to mark what was described in the press as its "100th anniversary", the cathedral hosted a show by sculptor Anish Kapoor. He said:

"To show works in Liverpool Cathedral is complex. It is a space that is alive both with the physical and spiritual. As such it is resonant with a powerful sense of body and the disembodied. The works that I have chosen to show in the cathedral are situated similarly between body and materiality and geometric immaterial which I refer to as the non-object. It is my hope that this conjunction of object and non-object here in this immense and potent space will be cause for reflection on the nature of religious experience and the human condition."

=== Stained glass ===
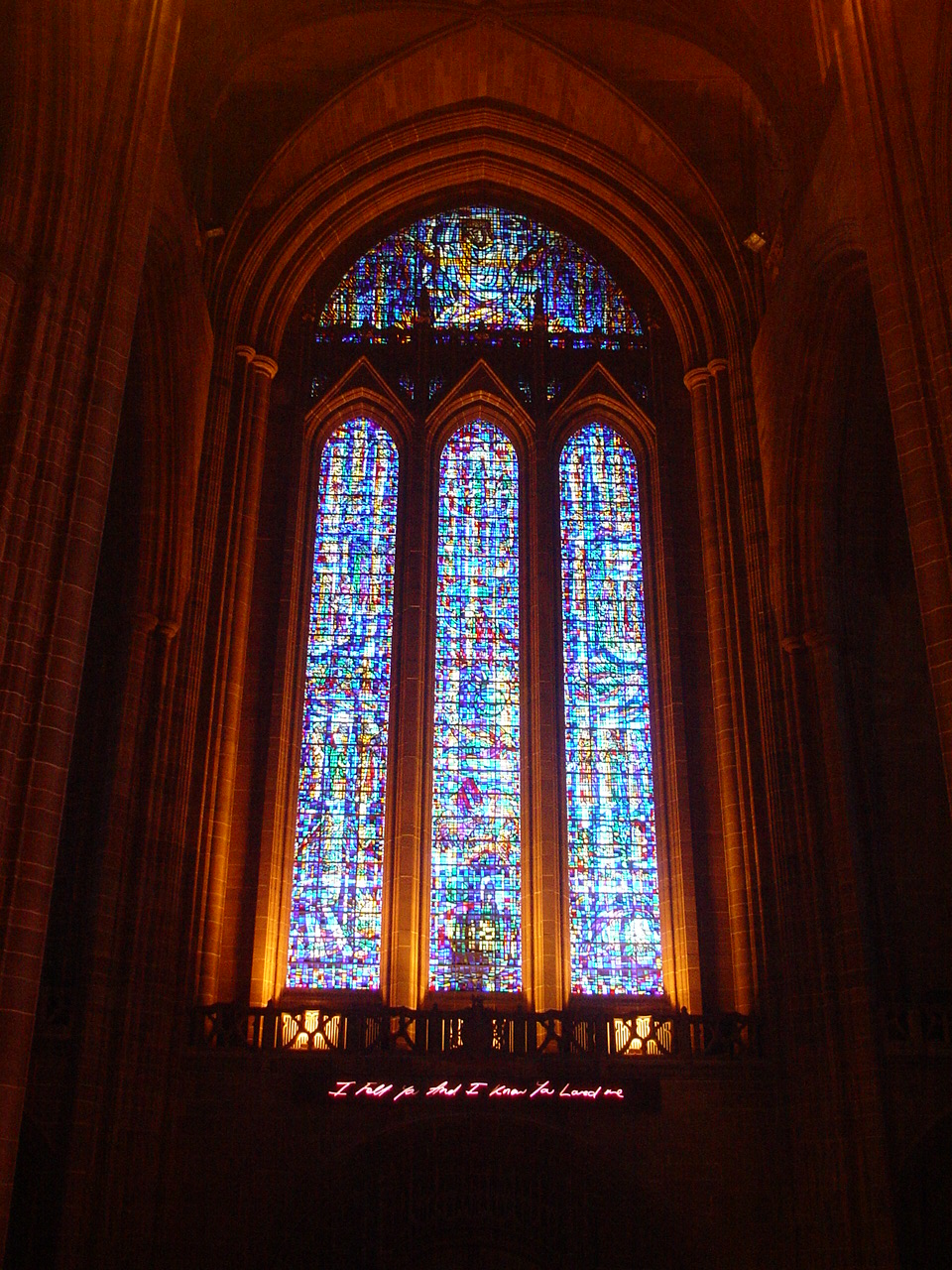
West window

The firm of James Powell and Sons (Whitefriars), Ltd., of London, provided most of the stained glass designs. John William Brown (1842–1928) designed the Te Deum window in the east end of the cathedral, as well as the original windows for the Lady Chapel, which was heavily damaged during German bombing raids in 1940. The glass in the Lady Chapel was replaced with designs, based on the originals, by James Humphries Hogan (1883–1948). He was one of the most prolific of the Powell and Sons designers; his designs can also be seen in the large north and south windows in the central space of the cathedral (each 100 feet tall). Later artists include William Wilson (1905–1972), who began his work at Liverpool Cathedral after the death of Hogan, Herbert Hendrie (1887–1946), and Carl Edwards (1914–1985), who designed the Benedicite window in the west front. The cathedral has approximately 1,700 m^{2} of stained glass.

== Burials ==
Bishop Chavasse and Sir Giles Gilbert Scott are buried in the precinct of the cathedral, the former in Founder's Plot, and the latter at the west end of the site. Clergy buried within the cathedral include the bishops Albert David and David Sheppard. Among the benefactors whose remains are buried in the cathedral are The 1st Baron Vestey and his brother, Sir Edmund Vestey, and Sir Frederick Morton Radcliffe and his wife Lady Maggie Radcliffe. The ashes of the donor of the cathedral bells, Thomas Bartlett, are kept in a casket in the ringing room. At the rear of the memorial to the 55th (West Lancashire) Division rest the ashes of Lieutenant-General Sir Hugh Jeudwine, who commanded the division from its formation in 1916 until the end of the First World War. Victoria Cross recipient Sergeant Arthur Herbert Lindsay Richardson is buried here, having been re-interred from the St. James Cemetery.

== Depictions ==
An original painting of the cathedral by Judy Joel appears on the First Class stamp in the Royal Mail's 2024 series of special Christmas stamps.

== Gallery ==
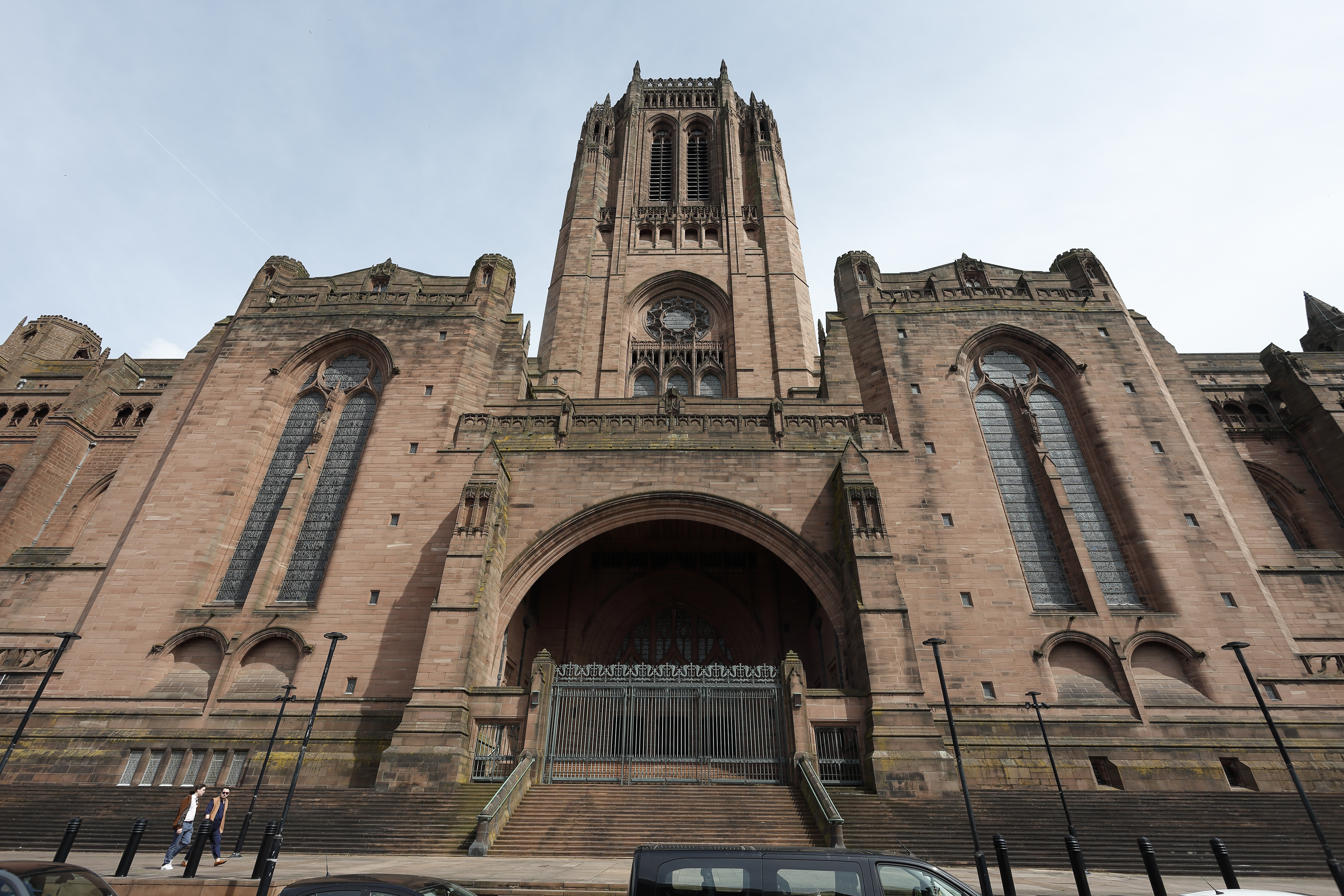
West façade

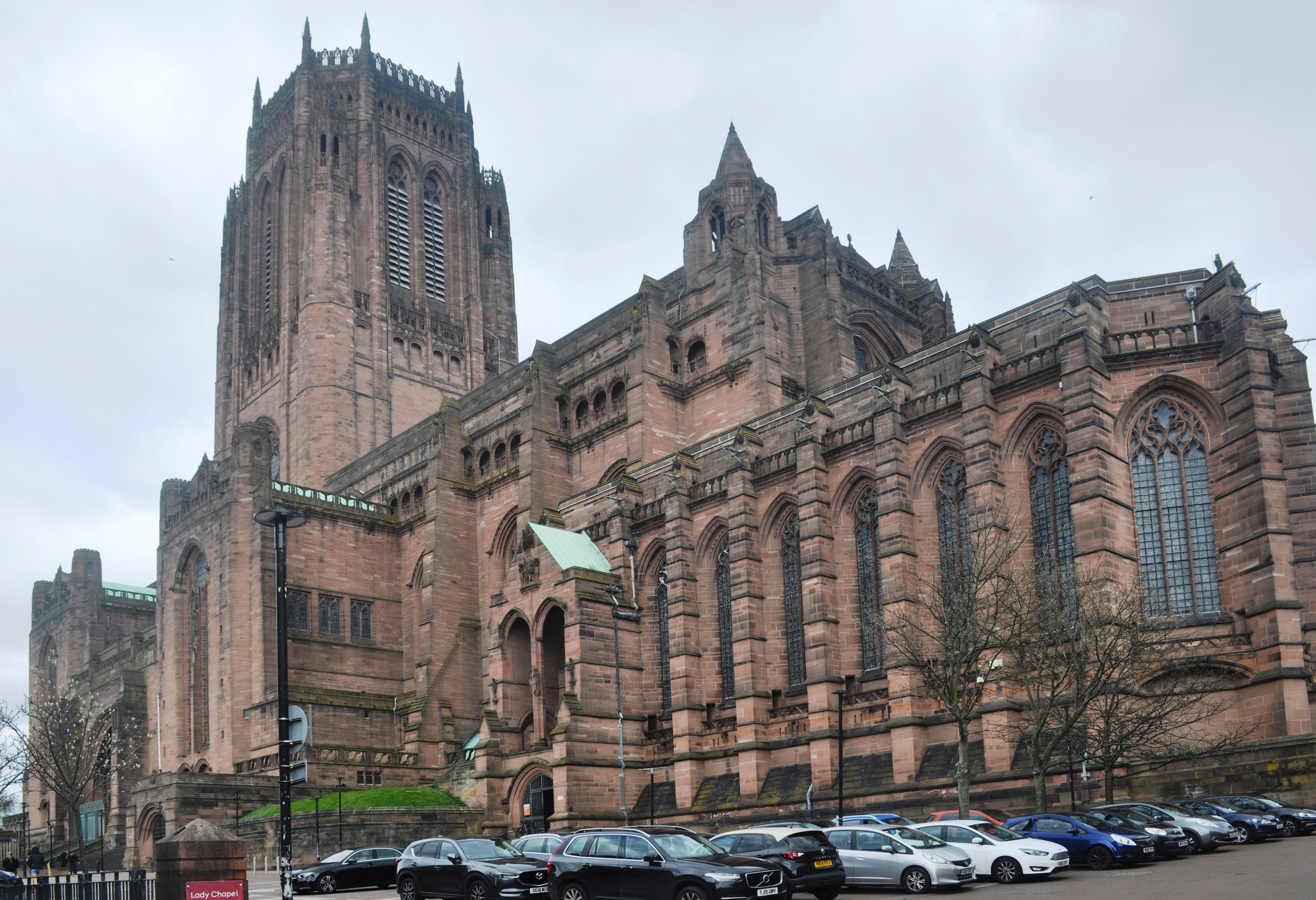
From the southwest

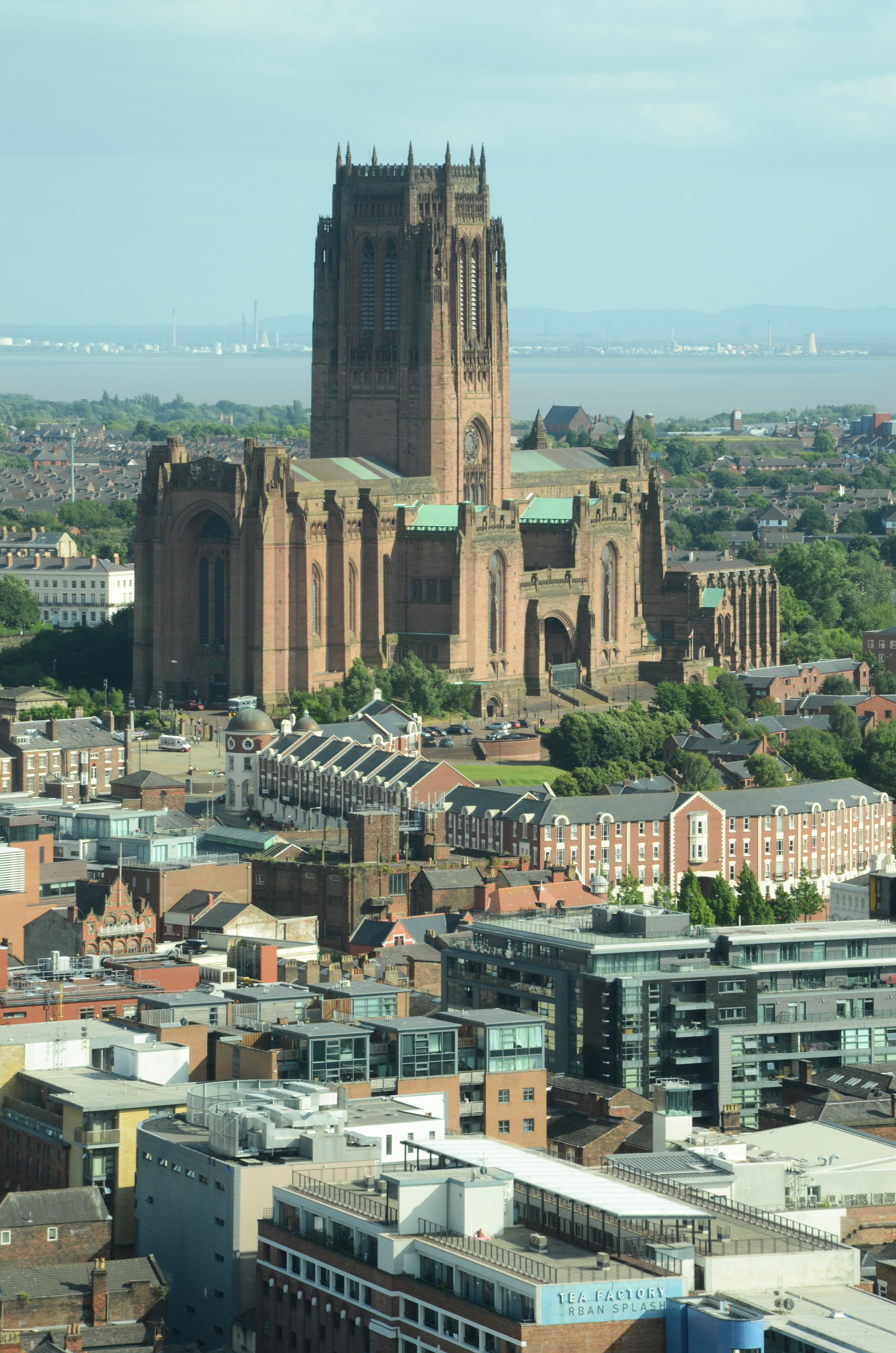
View from the Radio City Tower

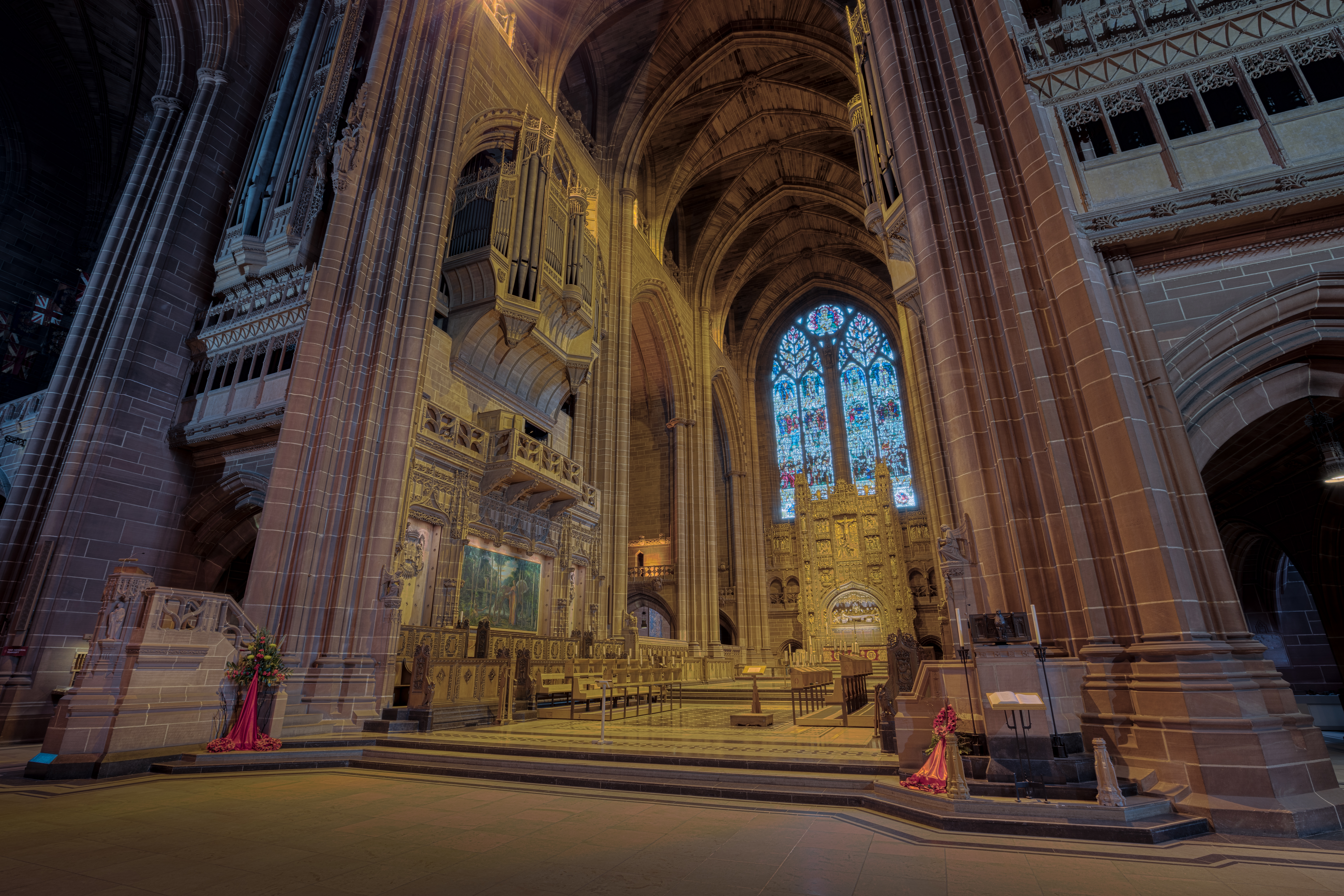
The altar

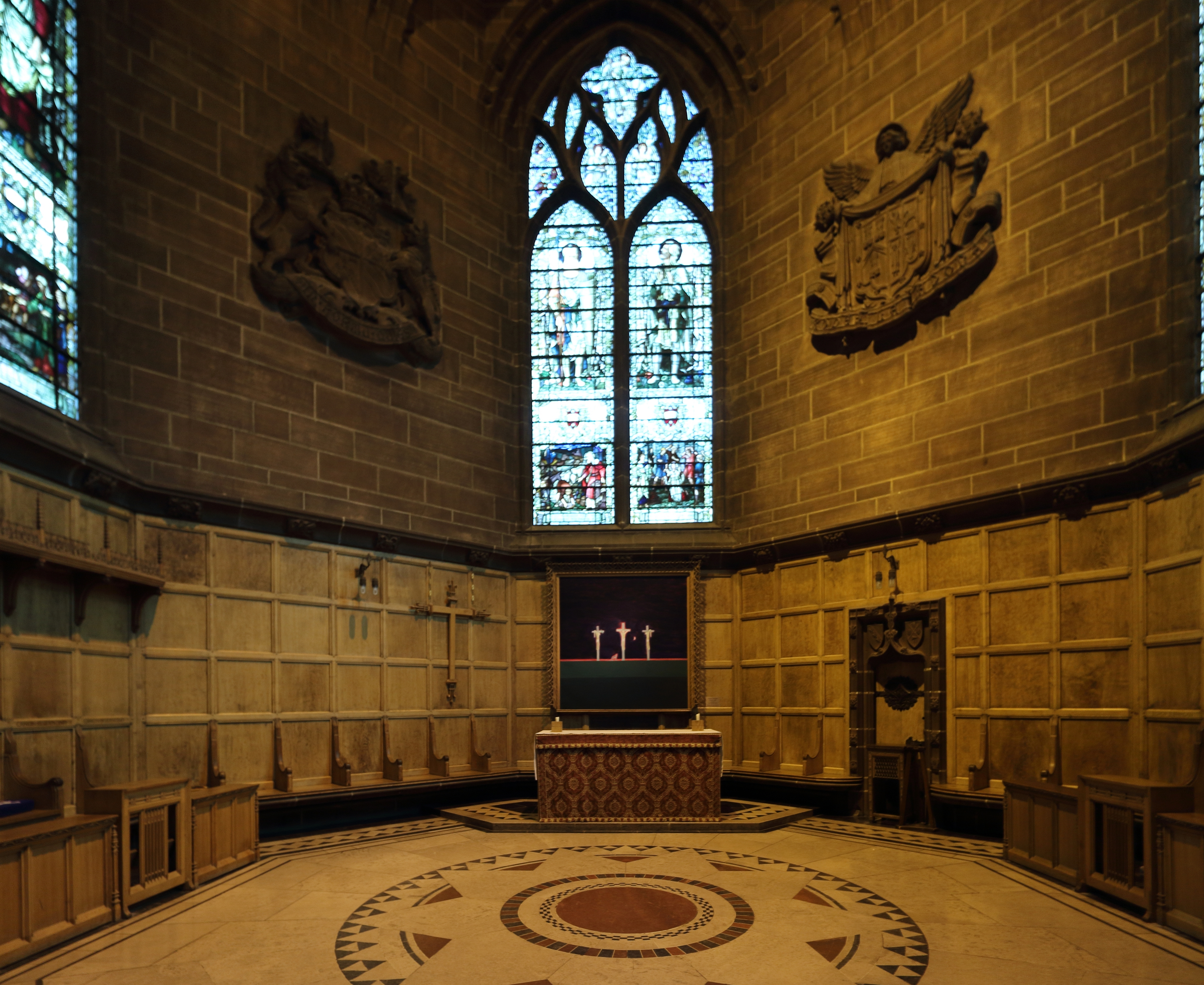
The chapter house, looking east from the doorway

== See also ==
- Grade I listed churches in Merseyside
- Architecture of Liverpool
- Liverpool Cathedral Constables
- Giles Gilbert Scott

== Notes and references ==
Notes

Sources

- Bailey, F A; Millington, R (1957). The Story of Liverpool. Liverpool: Corporation of the City of Liverpool. OCLC 19865965.
- Brandwood, Geoff; Austin, Tim; Hughes, John; Price, James (2012). The Architecture of Sharpe, Paley and Austin. Swindon: English Heritage. ISBN 978-1-84802-049-8.
- Cotton, Vere E (1964). The Book of Liverpool Cathedral. Liverpool: Liverpool University Press. OCLC 2286856.
- Powers, Alan (1996). "Liverpool and Architectural Education in the Early Twentieth Century". In Sharples, Joseph (ed.). Charles Reilly & the Liverpool School of Architecture 1904–1933. Liverpool: Liverpool University Press. pp. 1–23. ISBN 0-85323-901-0.
