= James Powell and Sons =

English glassmaking company

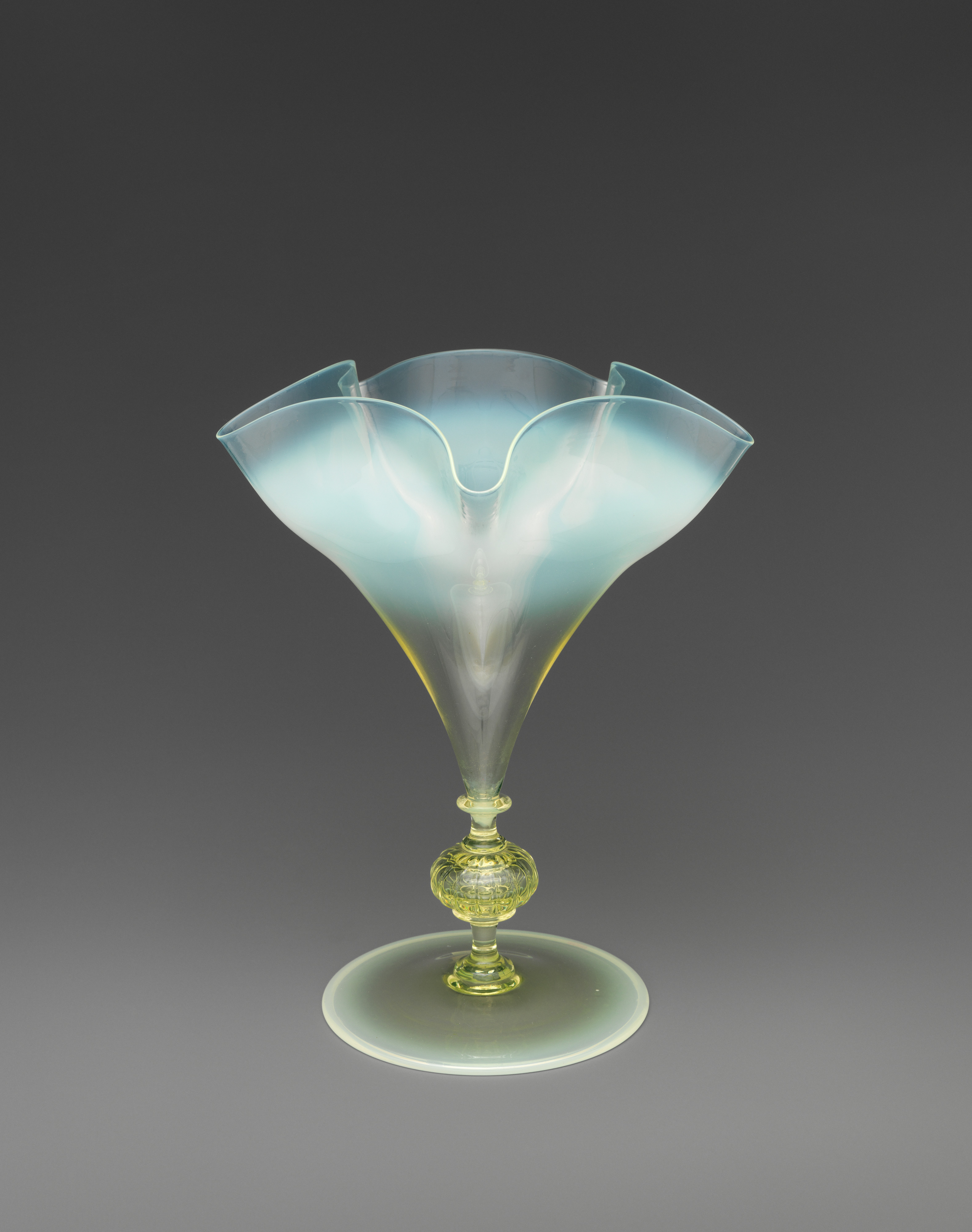
Vase, c. 1880

The firm of James Powell and Sons, also known as Whitefriars Glass, were London-based English glassmakers, leadlighters and stained-glass window manufacturers. As Whitefriars Glass, the company existed from the 17th century, but became well known as a result of the 19th-century Gothic Revival and the demand for stained glass windows, mostly for churches. It continued to make art glass into the 20th century, before finally closing production in 1980.

== History ==
=== Early years ===
In 1834, James Powell (1774–1840) purchased the Whitefriars Glass Company, a small glassworks off Fleet Street in London, believed to have been established in 1680. He was a London wine merchant and entrepreneur, of the same family as the founder of the Scout movement, Robert Baden-Powell. Powell, and his sons Arthur and Nathanael, were newcomers to glass making, but soon acquired the necessary expertise. They experimented and developed new techniques, devoting a large part of their production to the creating of stained glass windows for churches. The firm acquired a large number of patents for their new ideas and became world leaders in their field, business being boosted by the building of hundreds of new churches during the Victorian era. While Powell manufactured complete windows, it also provided glass to other stained glass firms.

A major product of the factory was decorative quarry glass which was mass-produced by moulding and printing, rather than hand-cutting and painting, and could be used in church windows as a cheap substitute for stained glass. It was often installed in new churches, to be later replaced by pictorial windows. Most of this quarry glass was clear, printed in black and detailed in bright yellow silver stain. Occasionally, the quarries were produced in red, blue or pink glass, but these are rare. Few entire windows of Powell quarries are to be seen in English churches, although they survive in little-seen locations such as vestries, ringing chambers and behind pipe organs. St Philip's Church, Sydney, retains a full set of Powell quarry windows, as does St Matthew's Church in Surbiton which was built in 1875 – a relatively late date for quarry windows, which may account for their survival. Powell also produced many windows in which pictorial mandorlas or roundels are set against a background of quarries.

=== Later Victorian period ===
During the latter part of the nineteenth century, the firm formed a close association with leading architects and designers such as T. G. Jackson, Edward Burne-Jones, William De Morgan and James Doyle. Whitefriars produced the glass that Philip Webb used in his designs for William Morris. The firm's production diversified in the 1850s to include domestic table glass, after supplying the glassware for William Morris's Red House.

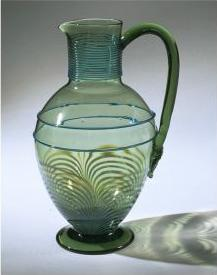
Jug, 1876, James Powell & Sons, at the V&A Museum

In 1875, Harry James Powell, grandson of James Powell and an Oxford graduate in chemistry, joined the business. His training led to more scientific production, and innovations such as previously unattainable colours and heat-resistant glass, for applications in science and industry, such as X-ray tubes and light bulbs.

New production lines such as opalescent glass proved to be successful. The firm took part in major exhibitions around the world. Designs were copied from historical Venetian and Roman glass found in European museums and art galleries. Nathanael Powell's eldest surviving son, Harry, an admirer of Ruskin, delivered numerous lectures on glass manufacture.

=== Between the wars ===
The firm's name was changed to Powell & Sons (Whitefriars) Ltd in 1919 and the growth in business demanded new premises. In 1923, a new factory was opened in Wealdstone. Despite a flourishing business, the great expense of the new factory scuttled plans to construct a village to house the workers in a style fashionable during the Arts and Crafts movement.

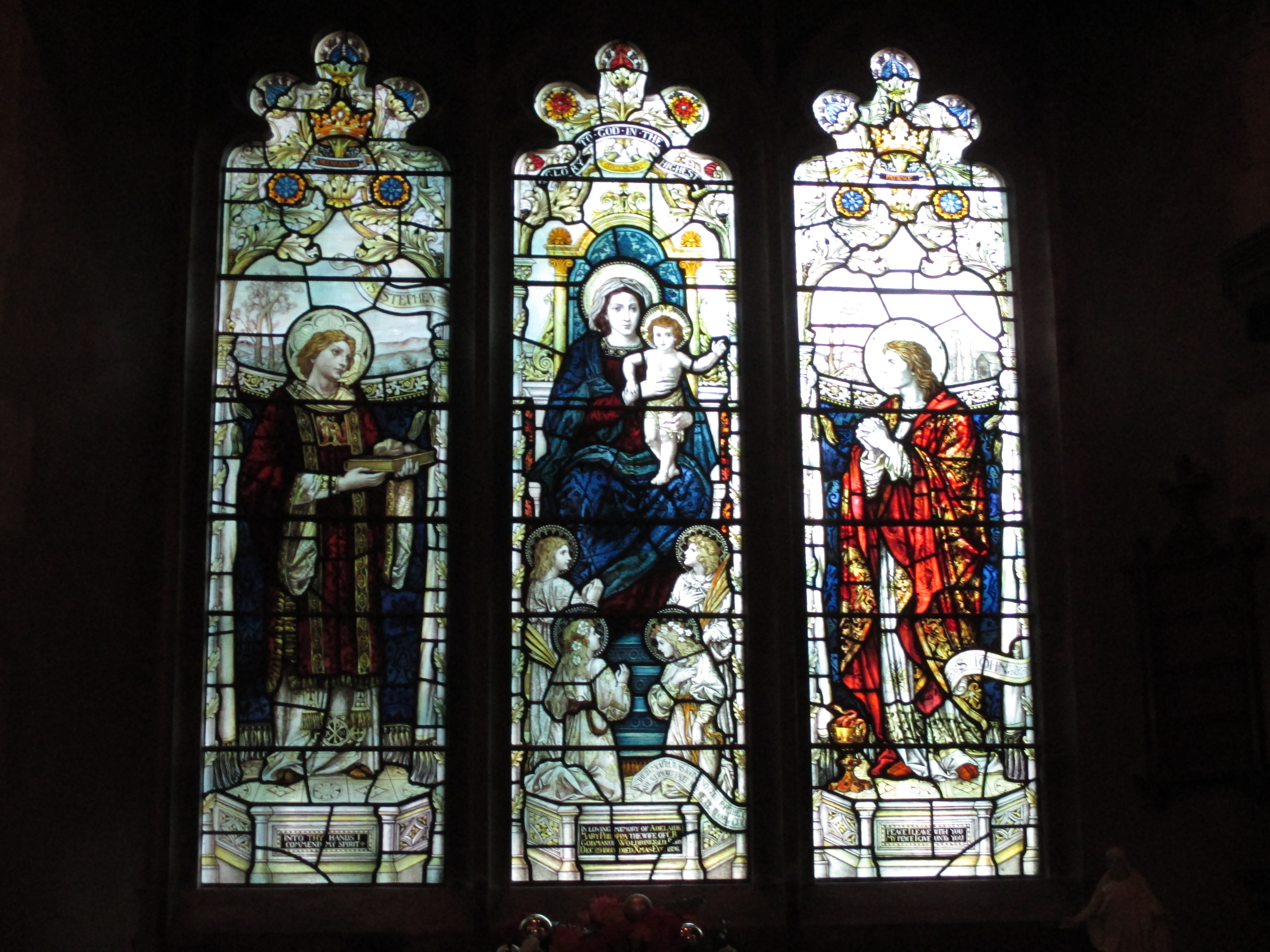
Nave window, St Peter's Church, Cowfold, West Sussex

In the years between World War I and World War II, business and the financial situation were much improved. Glassware trended to the colourful and heavy, and optic moulding and wheel engraving played a major part in bringing the Art Deco style to the middle and upper classes.

It was during this period that James Humphries Hogan (1883–1948), a designer with the firm, had the most impact on Powell & Sons. He was apprenticed to the firm at the age of fifteen, and it was the sole employer in his career. Hogan designed important windows for many cathedrals in England, notably the two windows in the great central space of Liverpool Cathedral, as well as windows for St. Thomas Church, Fifth Avenue, New York City. He designed tableware and serviceware, including the stemmed glassware he created specifically for British embassies over all the world. He rose in the company, becoming chief designer in 1913, art director in 1928, managing director in 1933, and finally chairman of the firm in 1946. In addition, Hogan travelled throughout the United States as primary sales agent for the Powell & Sons firm. In the period between 1926 and 1928, he produced a ten-fold increase in the Powell & Sons stained glass sales in America. He died in 1948, soon after returning from a long sales trip to the United States.

Harry Stammers, who later set up his own studio and created at least 180 windows for Anglican churches in the UK, began his career as an apprentice draughtsman at the firm in 1917, aged 14. He remained with the business until 1943.

In the 1930s the firm started production of millefiori paperweights, characterised by shallow domes and wide bases. This period of prosperity ended with World War II, when glass manufacture was restricted to that aiding the war effort. By the end of the war, the company was struggling to survive.

=== Postwar ===
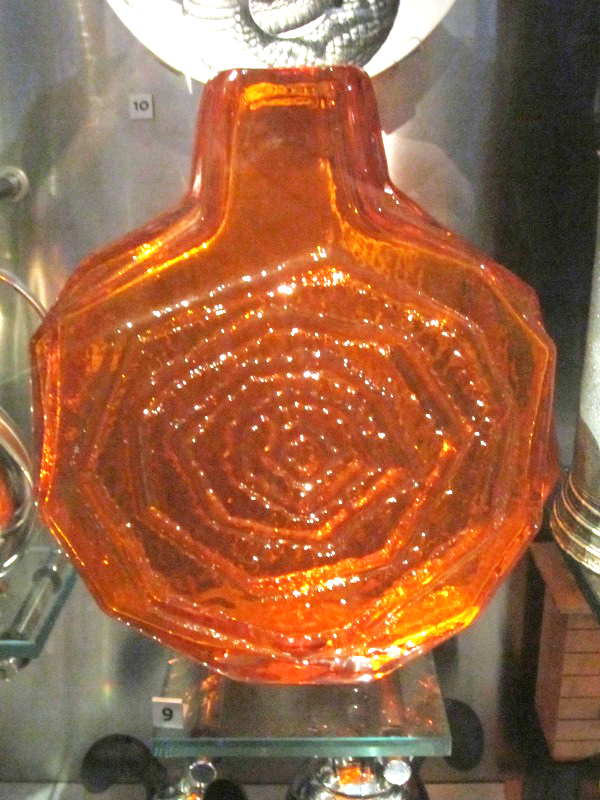
Banjo vase, in tangerine orange, late 1960s

The Festival of Britain of 1951 helped the British economy to recover. Whitefriars was selected as an outstanding example of modern British industry. The following years saw austere and functional Scandinavian design sweeping Europe, and dominating stock purchases by major outlets such as Selfridges and Fortnum & Mason. The arrival of glass bricks – cheap, thick slabs of coloured glass set in concrete bricks – dispensed with the need for expensive stained glass in new churches.

In 1952 the company was acquired by GH Zeal Limited who in 1962 changed the company's name back to Whitefriars Glass Ltd, specializing in free-form domestic glassware. In 1981 Caithness Glass purchased a 25 year license to use the Whitefriars name for its paperweights.

A former art student of the Royal College of Art, where he obtained a first class degree, Geoffrey Baxter was employed as a designer in 1954 by the Chief Designer, William Wilson. Baxter introduced a range of textured vases in 1967. He used found objects including bark and nails to produce moulds for soda-lime glass in many colours; the coloured glass was encased in clear glass. Baxter stayed with Whitefriars Glass until production ceased in 1980.

The high labour costs of handmade glass and late 1970s economic difficulties in the UK made Whitefriars uncompetitive. The factory site was bulldozed.

=== Dalle de verre and Pierre Fourmaintraux ===
Whitefriars was a leading producer of dalle de verre glass in Britain. Pierre Fourmaintraux brought the technique to the country from France and while at Whitefriars designed, produced and taught the technique. He is credited with teaching leading dalle de verre artist Dom Charles Norris.

Fourmaintraux became James Powell & Sons (later Whitefriars Glass) chief designer of slab glass and abstract windows from 1956. His first dalle de verre piece for the UK was said to be two small windows for St Peter's Reigate. Whitefriars identified their glass with a small image of a hooded friar, usually in a bottom corner of the window. Fourmaintraux identified his own glass by adding his initials PF near the friar.

== Archives ==
The firm's archives are split between several museums: the business records are held by the Museum of London, their designs are in the Archive of Art & Design at the Victoria and Albert Museum, and their cartoons (or, preparatory drawings) are at the Rakow Research Library of the Corning Museum of Glass.

In 2008 the Museum of London gifted the Rakow Library the Whitefriars Collection, consisting of 1,800 cartoons (or working drawings). The Rakow Library received a grant from the Institute of Museum and Library Services to develop an innovative methodology for preserving, digitizing, and making accessible this collection. Preservation work undertaken includes cartoons from Fourmaintraux's windows in St. Peter’s Church, Lawrence Weston, Bristol, and for the War Memorial in Auckland, New Zealand.

A pen and ink and watercolour drawing for Fourmaintraux's design of an abstract dalle de verre window for the 'Golden Ball', public house, Campo Lane, Sheffield is now in the Victoria and Albert Museum, London. The museum also holds a pen and ink and watercolour drawing for 15 small stained-glass windows of abstract design for Narberth Crematorium, near Porthcawl.

== List of works ==
- St. Peter & St. Paul's Church, Carbrooke, Norfolk
- Church of St. John the Baptist, Coltishall, Norfolk
- St. Nicholas' Church, Dersingham, Norfolk
- St. Mary's Church, East Bilney, Norfolk
- St. Mary's Church, East Carleton, Norfolk
- St. Andrew's Church, East Lexham, Norfolk
- All Saints' Church, Filby, Norfolk
- Church of St. John the Baptist, Garboldisham, Norfolk
- St. Andrew's Church, Great Dunham, Norfolk
- St. Andrew's Church, Holme Hale, Norfolk (depicting the crucifixion)
- All Saints' Church, Lessingham, Norfolk
- Cathedral of St. John the Baptist, St. John's, Newfoundland and Labrador
- St George’s School Chapel, Ascot, Berkshire (Michael Warnes Collection)
- Warfield Church (St Michael the Archangel), Berkshire (Michael Warnes Collection)
- St George’s Church, Tilehurst, Reading, Berkshire (Michael Warnes Collection)
- William & Mary Law School, Williamsburg, Virginia, USA
- Holy Trinity "New" Church, Wentworth, West Window
- St Mary's church Edwinstowe, Nottinghamshire.Archangels St Michael, St Gabriel and St Raphael

== Gallery ==
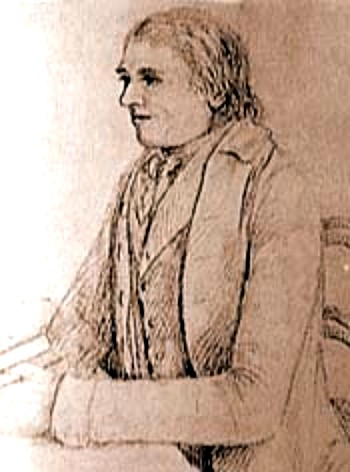
James Powell (1774-1840)

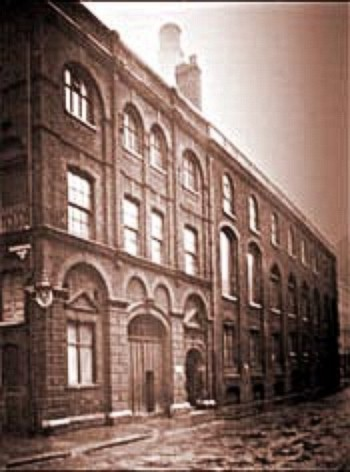
The Old Glass House in Tudor St

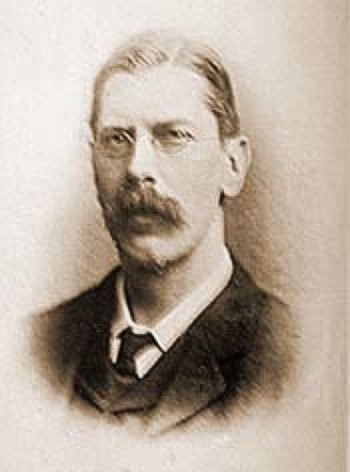
Harry James Powell

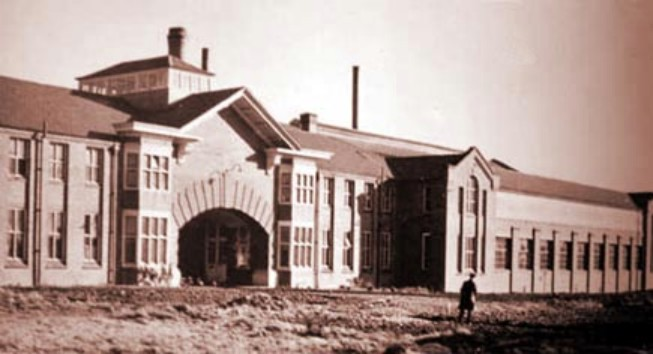
The new factory in Wealdstone

== See also ==
- British and Irish stained glass (1811–1918)
- Victorian era
- Gothic Revival architecture

== Bibliography ==
- Whitefriars Glass – James Powell & Sons, Wendy Evans, The Museum of London
