= Harry Stammers =

British stained glass artist (1902–1969)

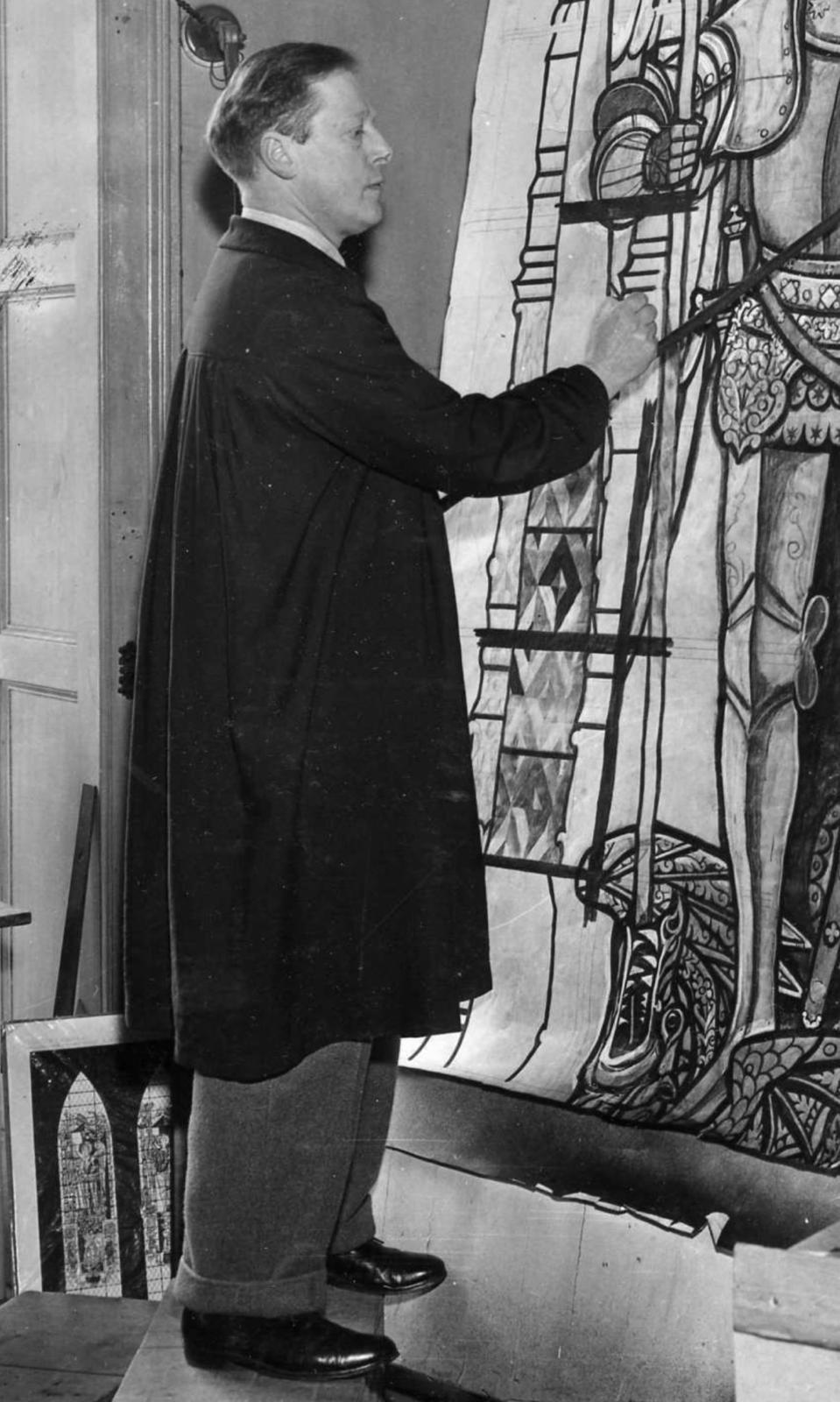
- Stammers in his York studio, c.1953
- Born: Harry James Stammers; 13 October 1902; Limehouse, London, United Kingdom
- Died: 21 August 1969 (aged 66); Bradwell, Buckinghamshire, United Kingdom
- Resting place: Church of St Lawrence, Bradwell
- Education: Saint Martin’s School of Art
- Known for: Stained glass
- Style: Figurative modernism
- Movement: York School of Glass Painting
- Elected: Fellow of the British Society of Master Glass Painters

Harry Stammers (13 October 1902 – 21 August 1969) was an English stained glass artist and master glass painter whose body of work comprised more than 180 windows, primarily ecclesiastical commissions for Church of England buildings. Stammers' work combined traditional craftsmanship with a personal response to modernism and twentieth-century religious practice. Closely associated with the revival of the York School of Glass Painting, examples of Stammers' work can be found in the cathedrals of Canterbury, Hereford, Lincoln, Salisbury and York.

== Career ==
=== Powell & Sons ===
Harry James Stammers was born on 13 October 1902 in Limehouse, London. At school he was said to have excelled in drawing and music. In 1917 he obtained an apprenticeship with Powell & Sons (Whitefriars) Ltd, joining their stained glass division as an apprentice draughtsman. This afforded Stammers the opportunity to attend evening classes at Saint Martin’s School of Art for several years. At Powell’s he worked alongside James Humphries Hogan, the firm’s chief window designer and a leading figure in early twentieth-century British stained glass.

In 1930 Stammers married Grace Delamere. The couple had two sons, James and Richard.

Stammers remained at Powell & Sons until 1943, neither seeking nor receiving any significant independent recognition of his work despite rising within the business. The catalyst for his departure from the firm was pragmatic rather than professional. Due to the threat to London from enemy bombing, his sons had both been evacuated to Devon at the beginning of the Second World War. When an opportunity arose in 1943 for Stammers to take up a position of draughtsman with J. Wippell & Co. in Exeter, his decision to move was primarily taken in order to be closer to his sons.

=== Exeter and independence ===
The move to Wippell & Co. did nothing to satiate Stammers' desire for more artistic and professional freedom that had grown over a number of years. Even prior to his departure from Powell & Sons, his dissatisfaction with what he regarded as a formulaic and conservative approach to design, relying on stock patterns and traditional idioms, had become ingrained.

In 1945, Stammers resigned from Wippell & Co. in order to establish his own stained glass studio in Exeter and seek opportunities to express a more personal and contemporary idiom through his own independent work. Among his first commissions was a window for the Church of St Mary the Less in Cambridge. The opportunity arose thanks to Eric Milner-White, then Dean of King’s College, Cambridge, who had been impressed by a design Stammers had submitted to the Royal Academy of Arts. When the Ely Diocesan Advisory Committee sought Milner-White's advice on selecting an artist, he recommended Stammers.

=== Studio in York ===
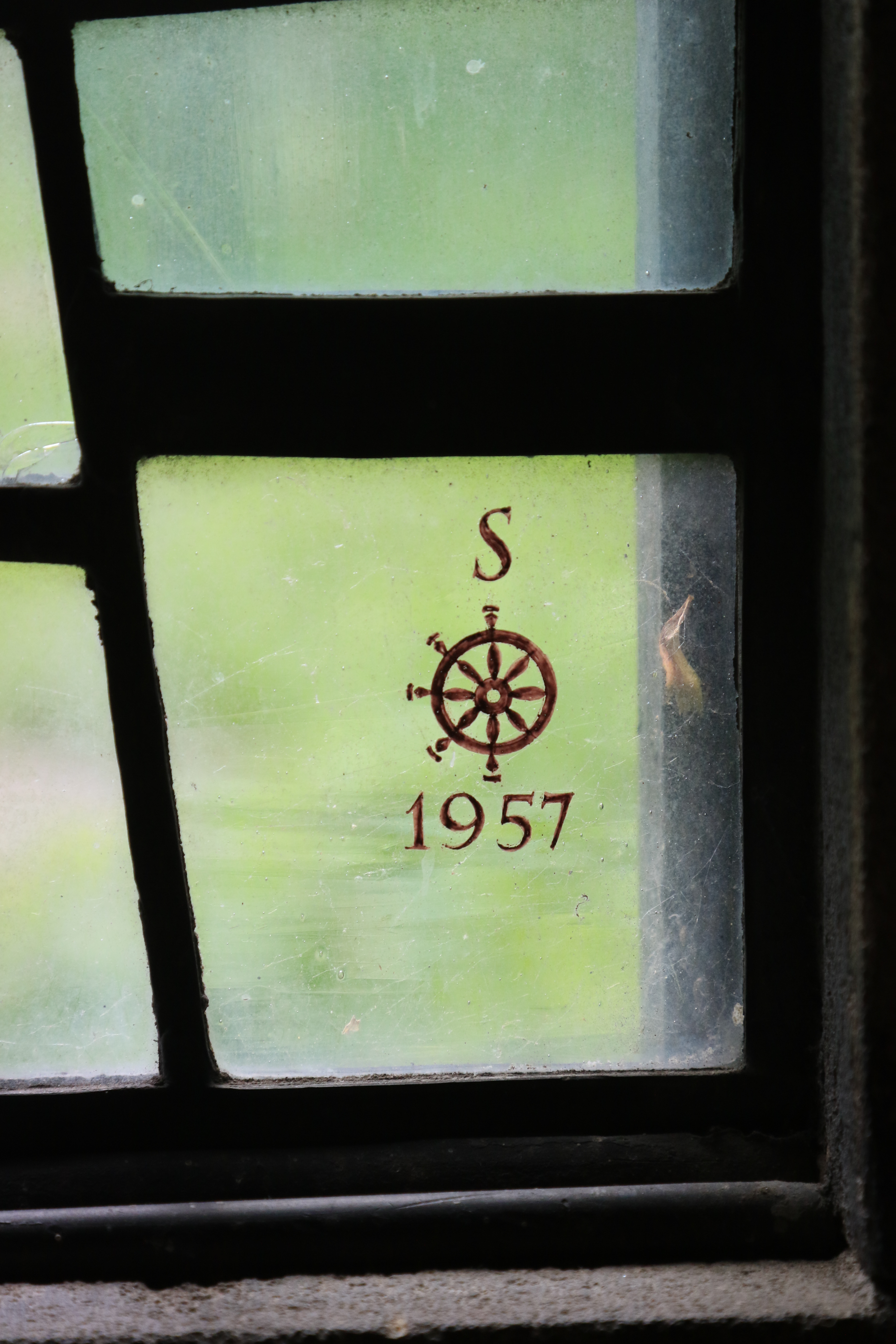
Maker's mark of Harry Stammers

The relationship with Milner-White would prove to be a pivotal one in Stammers' independent career. In 1947 Milner-White - who by then had been appointed Dean of York Minster - invited Stammers to establish a glass-painting studio and school in York, reviving a craft that had been associated with the city prior to the Reformation. Milner-White arranged a flat and studio space at Grays Court and provided Stammers with a kiln. Stammers soon invited Harry Harvey, whom he had met at Wippell’s & Co., to join him as assistant. Harvey worked at the studio for nine years, contributing to both the design and fabrication of windows, before opening his own glass studio in 1956 with the blessing of Stammers.

Stammers lived and worked in York until 1960, which would prove to be the most productive period of his career. Undoubtedly, he benefited from the increased availability of commissions that resulted from the largescale renewal of church buildings in the years following the Second World War, including a number of windows commissioned as individual war memorials, including examples at St Helen's Church in Skipwith (1947) and St Mary's Church, Hemingbrough (1949). Stammers also developed productive working relationships with the architects W. H. Randoll Blacking and George Pace, both of whom provided commissions for newly built or restored churches on which they had been enlisted as architect.

It was during Stammers time in York that he won commissions for seven different Anglican cathedrals. His first, at Salisbury Cathedral, is a memorial window to members of the Glider Pilot Regiment killed in the Second World War, installed in 1950. He followed this with a memorial window at Lichfield Cathedral, dedicated to the Staffordshire Yeomanry, completed in 1951. In 1952 Stammers was invited by Blacking to design a painted reredos to be installed in the refurbished Lady Chapel at Hereford Cathedral. At Lincoln Cathedral, he was commissioned to provide four individual windows for the Royal Air Force Memorial Chapel, completing the first in 1953, with the remaining windows following in 1954, 1958 and 1966 - the last being made at Stammers' Bradwell studio after he relocated.

Of the four commissions undertaken by Stammers for York Minister, only one was a window. In 1955 Stammers provided painted designs for both the astronomical clock given in memory of airmen stationed in Yorkshire who died in the Second World War, and a design for the memorial to physicians and surgeons of York. He would provide a similar design for the memorial to the architects, masons and builders of the minsters of York in 1958. His only work in glass in York Minster is a 1957 panel depicting the Instruments of the Passion, inserted into a window with older glass surrounding.

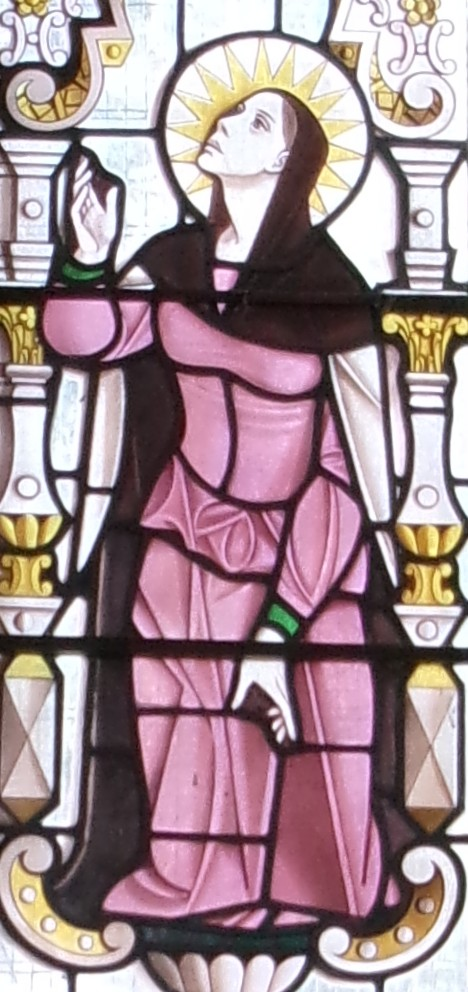
Saint Monica of Hippo, in St Mary's Church, Wilton

For Glasgow Cathedral's Blackadder aisle, Stammers provided four windows in 1956 and a further four in 1960, in addition to two regimental memorial windows in the nave, dated 1956 and 1958. At Canterbury Cathedral, Stammers designed and made a five-light window depicting five of Canterbury's early archbishops, which was installed in 1959.

Stammers completed his only overseas commission in 1960 for the Anglican Cathedral in Seoul, South Korea; an oculus in the upper western façade depicting St George slaying the dragon.

=== Move to Bradwell ===
In 1960 Stammers left York and moved his studio to Bradwell, one of the villages incorporated into the new town of Milton Keynes. It was here that he produced some of his most well-known works, including large commissions for the Church of St Mary Redcliffe in Bristol and the Church of St Mark in Broomhill, Sheffield. At St Mary Redcliffe, Stammers was responsible for the entire cycle of five windows in the Lady Chapel, installed between 1960 and 1965, which together tell the story of the Life of the Virgin. The central east-facing window, depicting the Nativity and the Pietà, was the last to be installed. It is flanked to the north by the Annunciation and Presentation windows, and to the south by representations of Pentecost and Jesus at the Temple.

At Broomhill, a church ruined during the Sheffield Blitz and rebuilt by George Pace from 1961 to 1963, Stammers' monumental east window is set within a rectangular concrete frame notable for its thick, branch-like window bars, draws on the traditional hymn Te Deum laudamus, and depicts the image of Christ in Majesty to the centre, interwoven among a multitude of saints, worshippers, animals and plants.

Stammers' 1963 window at the Church of St Martin le Grand in York is among his most original. It commemorates the destruction of this and other churches in the 1942 bombing of York, the form of the red flames taking hold of the buildings, and the rising smoke above, resulting in one of his most abstract works.

=== Final years ===
Stammers’ would continue working at his Bradwell studio and accepting commissions up until his death on 21 August 1969 aged 66. He was buried in the churchyard of St Lawrence's Church in Bradwell, for which he had provided four windows in 1966, unusually of an entirely abstract design, save for one of them including some reset Victorian glass. His widow Grace was buried in the same plot following her death in 1977.

== Style and technique ==
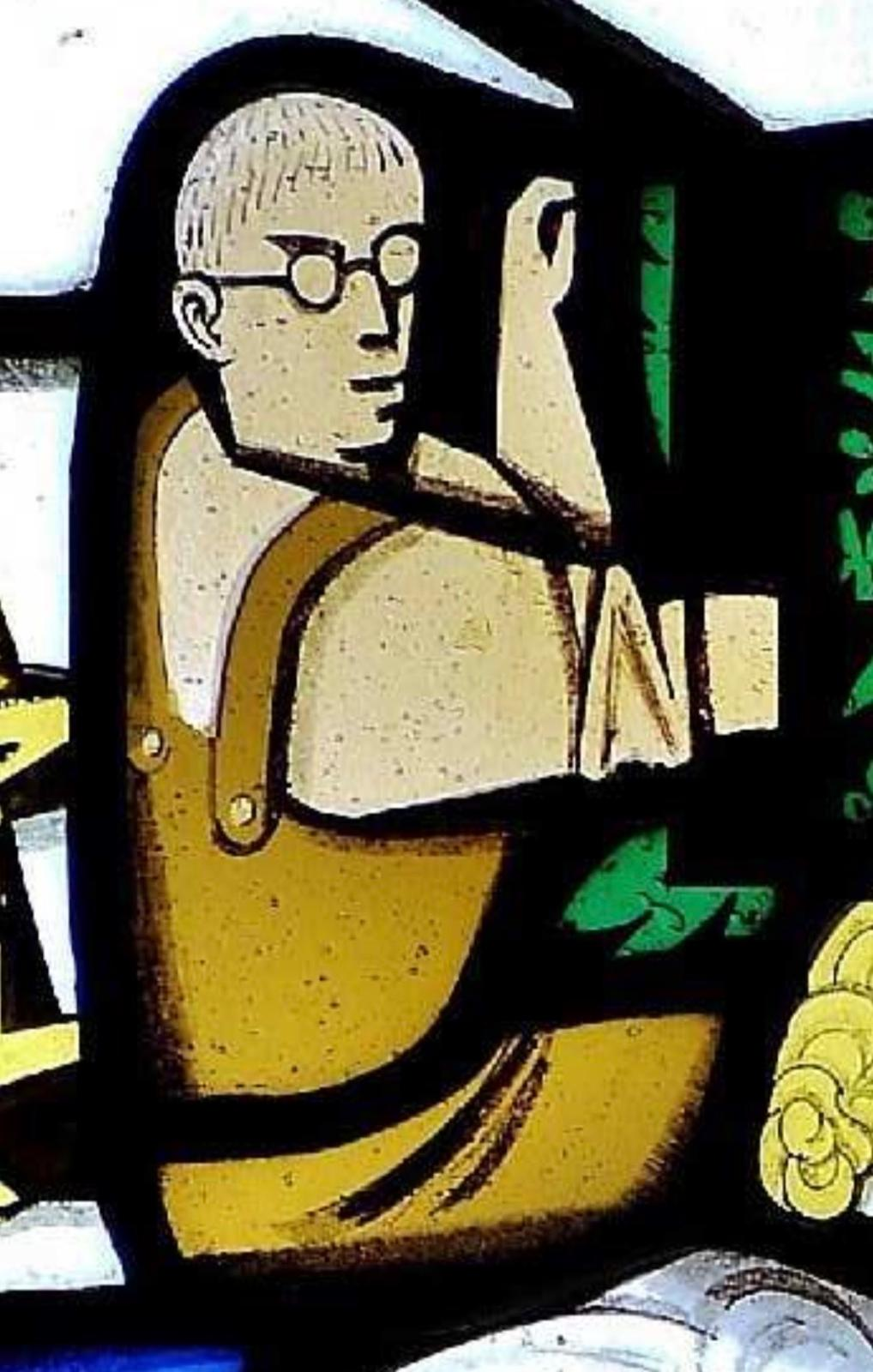
Self-portrait, Pocklington School Chapel, Yorkshire

Contemporaries described Stammers as shy and diffident, not given to self-promotion. He never wrote about his artistic philosophy. His firm grounding in traditional stained glass techniques and lifelong commitment to serving the liturgical and devotional needs of the Church of England, meant that Stammers has rarely been discussed in the context of more avant-garde movements in stained glass associated with artists such as John Piper and Lawrence Lee.

However, by establishing his own studio, Stammers was able to develop his own idiom with regard to composition and colour, clearly demonstrating an openness to modern glass design. His works are best associated with the bold palettes, sharp geometries and figurative narratives that came to define the Festival of Britain style, centered on the national exhibition and fair held on London’s Southbank in 1951. In dialogue with contemporaries such as Leonard Evetts, John Hayward and W. T. Carter Shapland, this style of figurative modernism resonated with both the general public and commissioning institutions, despite being overlooked by the art establishment.

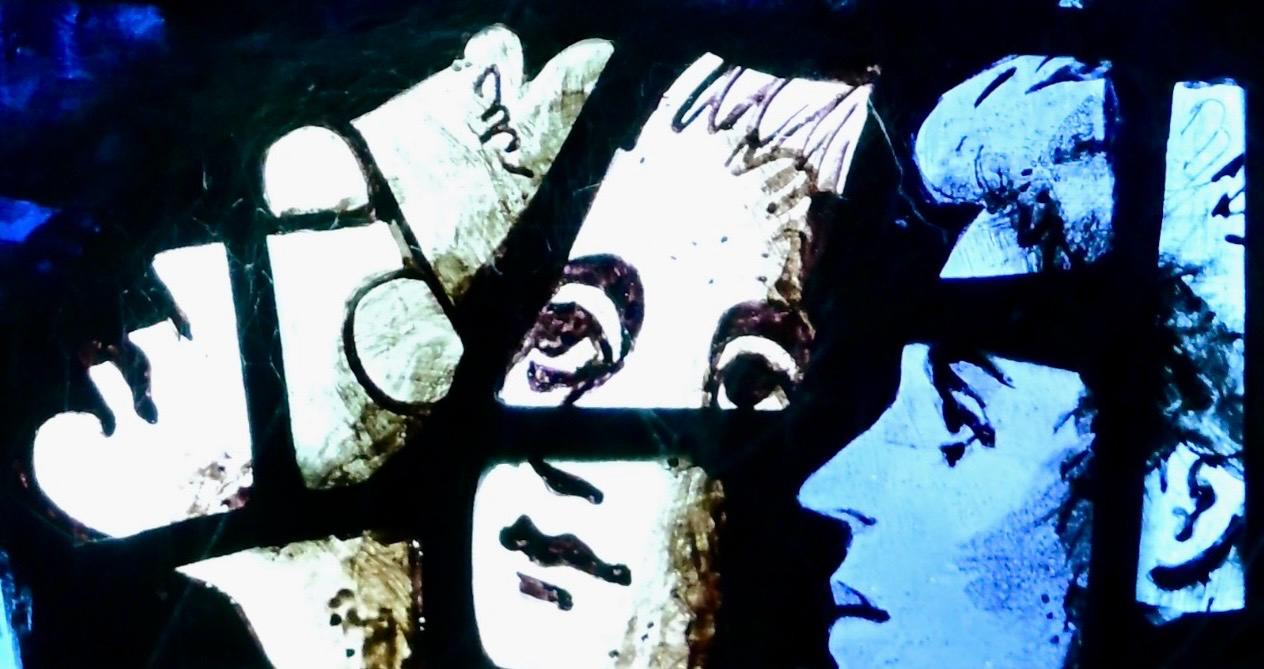
Self-portrait (left), St Mark's Church, Broomhill, Sheffield

Stammers' designs for windows were invariably figurative, frequently depicting contemporary figures—worshippers in church, workers in their occupations, and families in domestic settings—integrated into sacred narratives. Stammers sometimes incorporated the motif of a bespectacled man within his designs, said to be a self-portrait. His compositions are often notable for their abundant representation of the natural world, including mammals, birds, fish, flowers, and celestial imagery, reflecting Stammers’ conviction that nature formed part of divine creation.

As Stammers reputation spread, he secured an increasing number of commissions for large windows, often the main east chancel window of a church. For these he developed a frequently repeated iconography on the theme of Christ in Majesty, showing as its central image Jesus seated on a throne in Heaven. Examples from the late 1950s, including windows at St Andrew's Church in Accrington (1958), Holy Trinity Church in Newport (1958) and St Mary's Church in Scarborough (1958) depict Christ with one hand raised in blessing. From 1962 Stammers adapted his design to show Christ with arms outstretched, as seen in examples at St Mary's Church in Wooler (1962), St Faith's Church in Hexton (1964) and St Michael and All Angels' Church in Preston (1968). At Troston in Suffolk, Stammers East window depicts the Supper at Emmaus (1964).

Typically, a commission began with an approach to Stammers from a donor or congregation seeking a memorial window. After consultation with the appropriate church authority from whom approval was required, Stammers would submit a design sketch based on the customer brief. Once approved, Stammers executed the full process of window making, from cartoon to painting and firing, from his own studio. Larger commissions would sometimes take him up to three years to realise.

== Legacy ==
Stammers' legacy lives on through the continuation of the York School of Glass Painting, initially through the independent success of his former assistant Harry Harvey and, latterly, the practice of York-based stained glass artists such as Ann Sotheran and Helen Whittaker.

The Harry Stammers archive is held by the Borthwick Institute for Archives at the University of York, where it was deposited in 2011.

== Selected works ==
- Church of St Mary the Less, Cambridge
  - Window depicting the Finding of Christ in the Temple (c.1946)
- St Helen's Church, Skipwith
  - The Pilgrim's Progress (1947)
- St Marylebone Parish Church, London
  - South aisle, Queen's Own Cameron Highlanders memorial window - St Andrew (1948)
  - North west vestry, Browning memorial window - two angels (1952)
- St Mary's Church, Hemingbrough
  - South nave memorial window with saints George, Nicholas and Michael (1949)
- Salisbury Cathedral
  - Memorial window to members of the Glider Pilot Regiment killed in the Second World War (1950)
- Lichfield Cathedral
  - Memorial window to members of the Staffordshire Yeomanry killed in the Second World War (1951)
- Hereford Cathedral
  - Five painted panels for the Lady Chapel reredos (1952)
- Lincoln Cathedral
  - RAF memorial chapel - New Zealand window (1953)
  - RAF memorial chapel - Bomber Command window (1954)
  - RAF memorial chapel - Flying Training Command window (1958)
  - RAF memorial chapel - Rhodesian airman window (1966)
- York Minster
  - Painted panels of astronomical clock (1955)
  - Instruments of the Passion painted panel (1957)
- Glasgow Cathedral
  - Regimental memorial window (1956)
  - Eight windows for the Blackadder aisle (1956–1960)
  - Cameroonian Regiment memorial window (1960)
- Canterbury Cathedral
  - Window depicting five of Canterbury’s early archbishops (1959)
- Church of St Bartholomew, Aldborough
  - Window depicting the cardinal events in the life of Jesus (1948)
- Hull Minster
  - Elizabeth Gelder memorial window (1952)
  - Freedom window (1953)
- Church of St Mary, Scarborough
  - East window on theme of the Benedicte, showing the totality of creation praising its maker (1958)
- St Andrew's Church, Accrington
  - East window, Christ in Majesty (1958)
- Church of the Holy Trinity, Newport
  - East window, Christ in Majesty (1958)
- Seoul Anglican Cathedral
  - West façade oculus depicting St George slaying the dragon (1960)
- Church of St Mary Redcliffe, Bristol
  - Lady Chapel - south window, Pentecost (1960)
  - Lady Chapel - north window, Jesus presented as Saviour of the World (1961)
  - Lady Chapel - south window, Jesus in the Temple with the Elders (1964)
  - Lady Chapel - north window, Annunciation (1965)
  - Lady Chapel - East window, Nativity and Pieta (1966)
- Church of St Mary, Wooler
  - East window depicting Christ in Majesty (1962)
- Church of St Mark, Broomhill, Sheffield
  - East window on theme of the Te Deum (1963)
  - Lancet windows below east window (1963)
- Church of St Martin le Grand, York
  - Window commemorating 1942 bombing of York (1963)
- Church of St Michael on the Mount Without, Bristol
  - East window, Christ in Majesty (1964)
- Church of St Mary, Troston
  - East window, Supper at Emmaus (1964)
- Church of St Faith, Hexton
  - East window, Christ in Majesty (1964)
- Church of St Michael and All Angels, Preston
  - East window, Christ in Majesty (1964)
- Church of St Lawrence, Bradwell
  - Two abstract panels (1966)

== Gallery ==
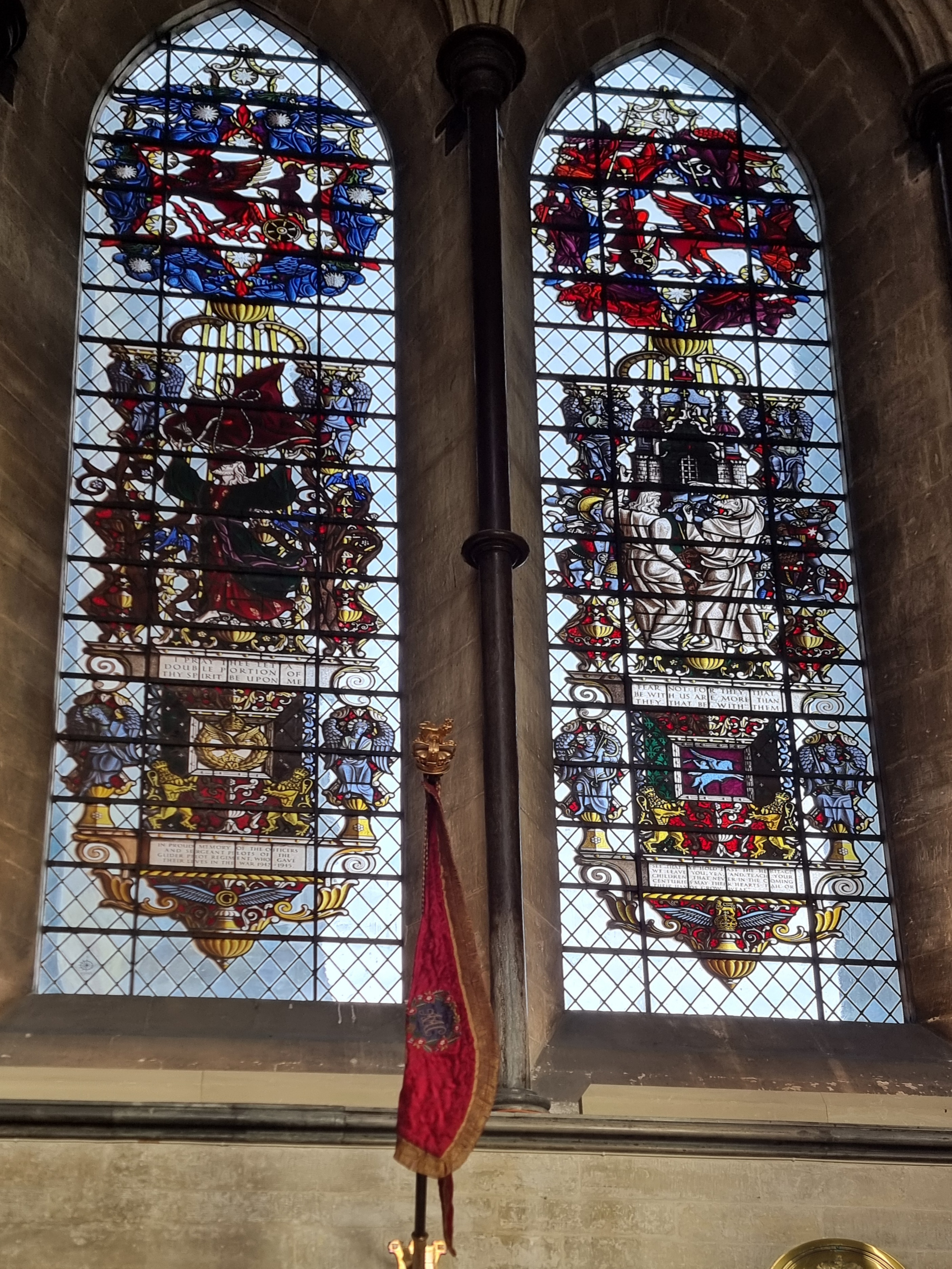
Salisbury Cathedral: Glider Pilot Regiment window (1958)

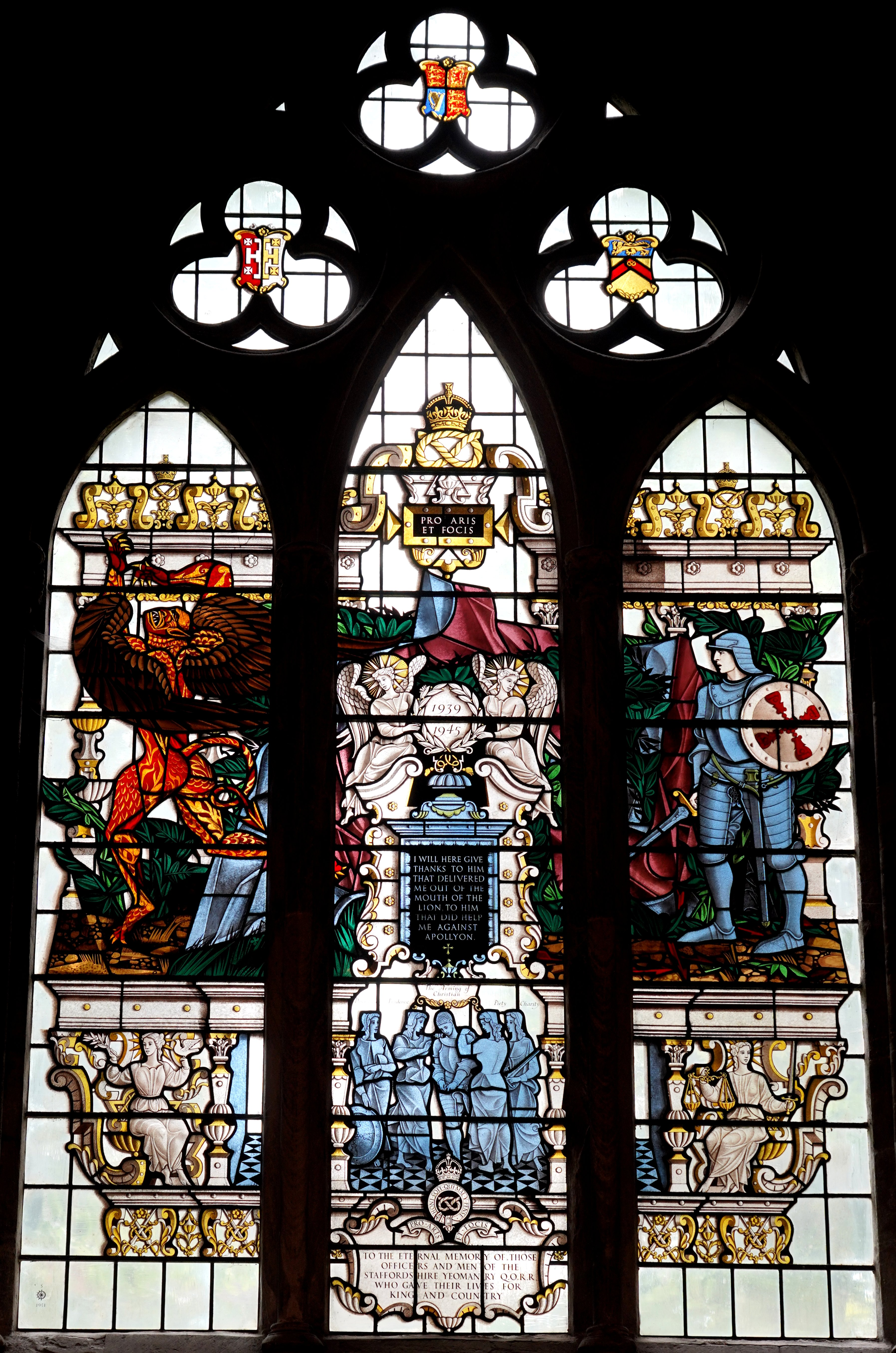
Lichfield Cathedral: Staffordshire Yeomanry window (1951)

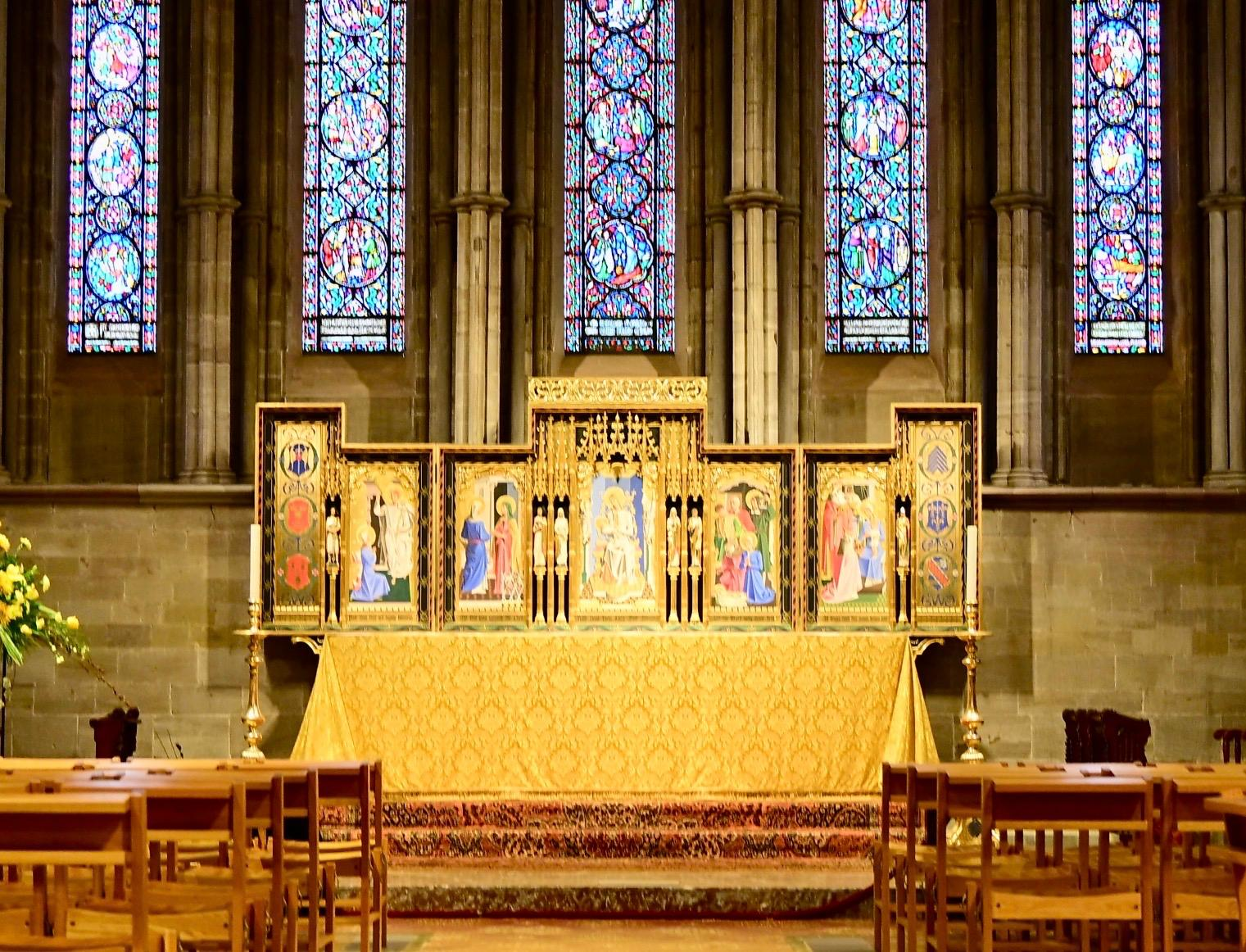
Hereford Cathedral: Lady Chapel reredos (1952)

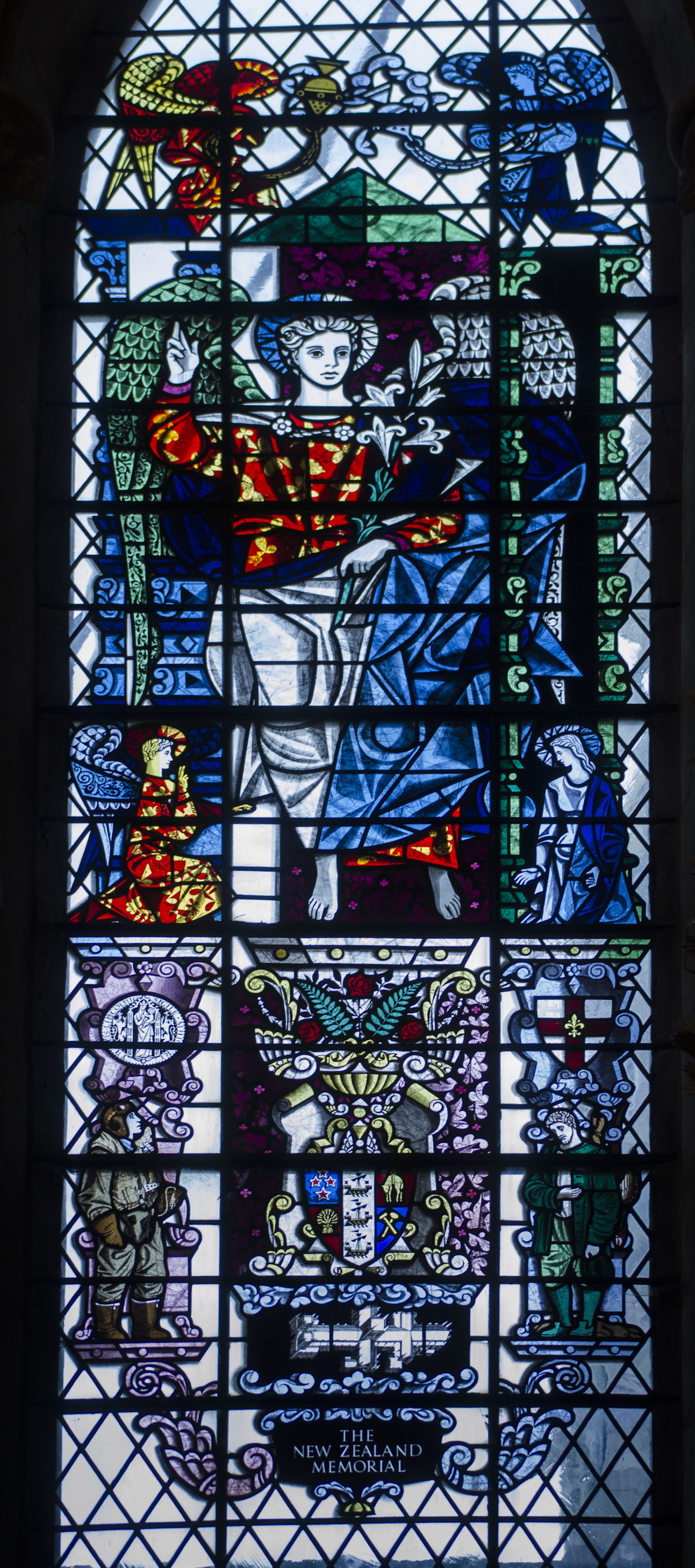
Lincoln Cathedral: RAF chapel - New Zealand window (1953)

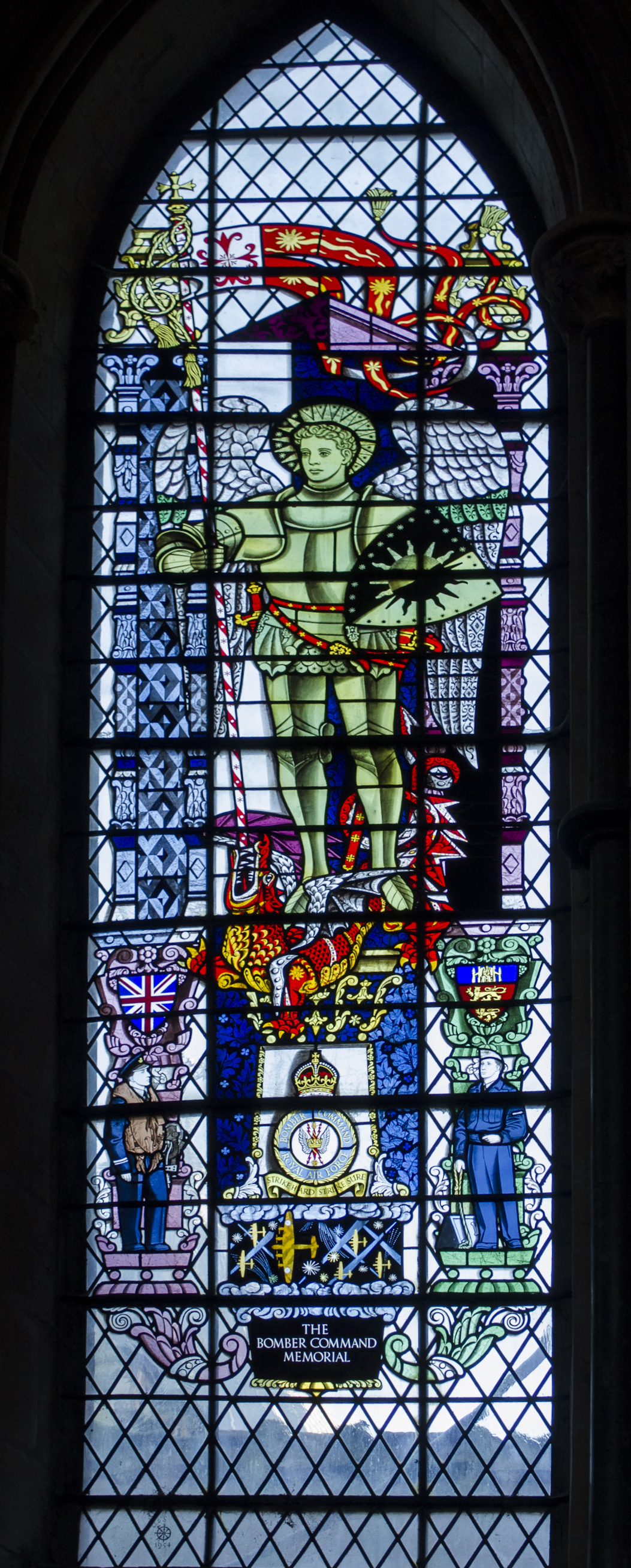
Lincoln Cathedral: RAF chapel - Bomber Command window (1954)

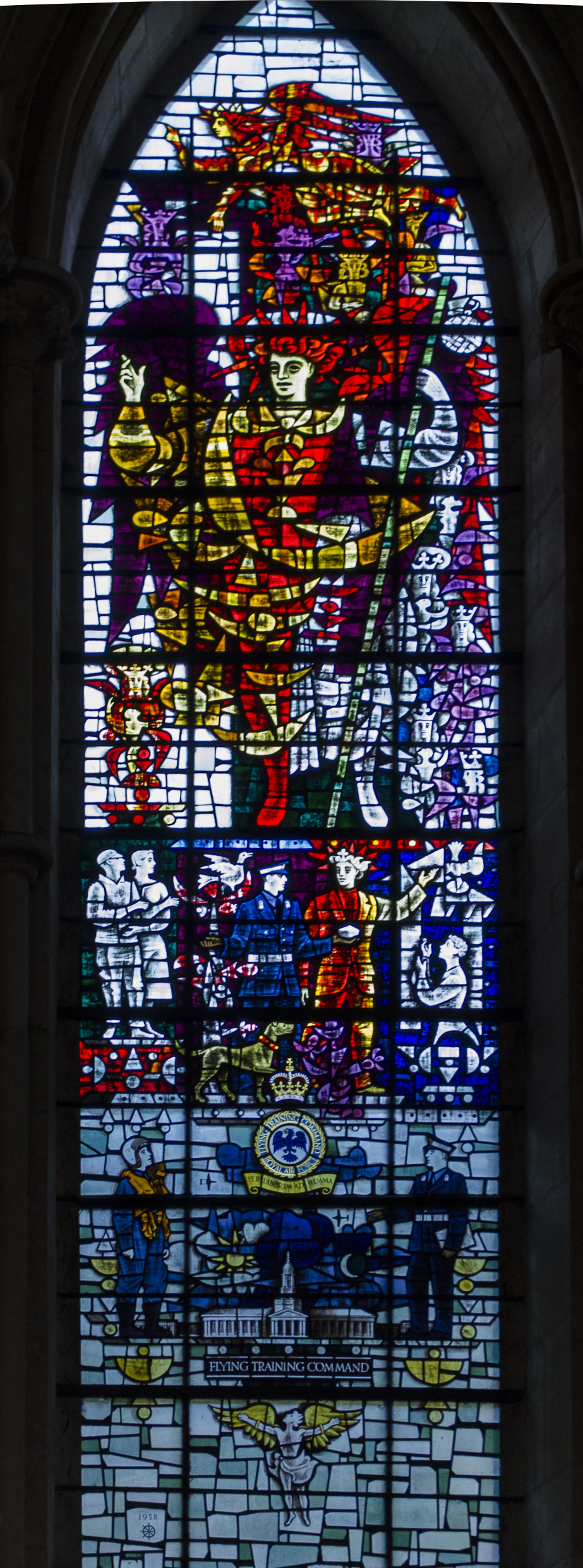
Lincoln Cathedral: RAF chapel - Flying Training Command window (1958)

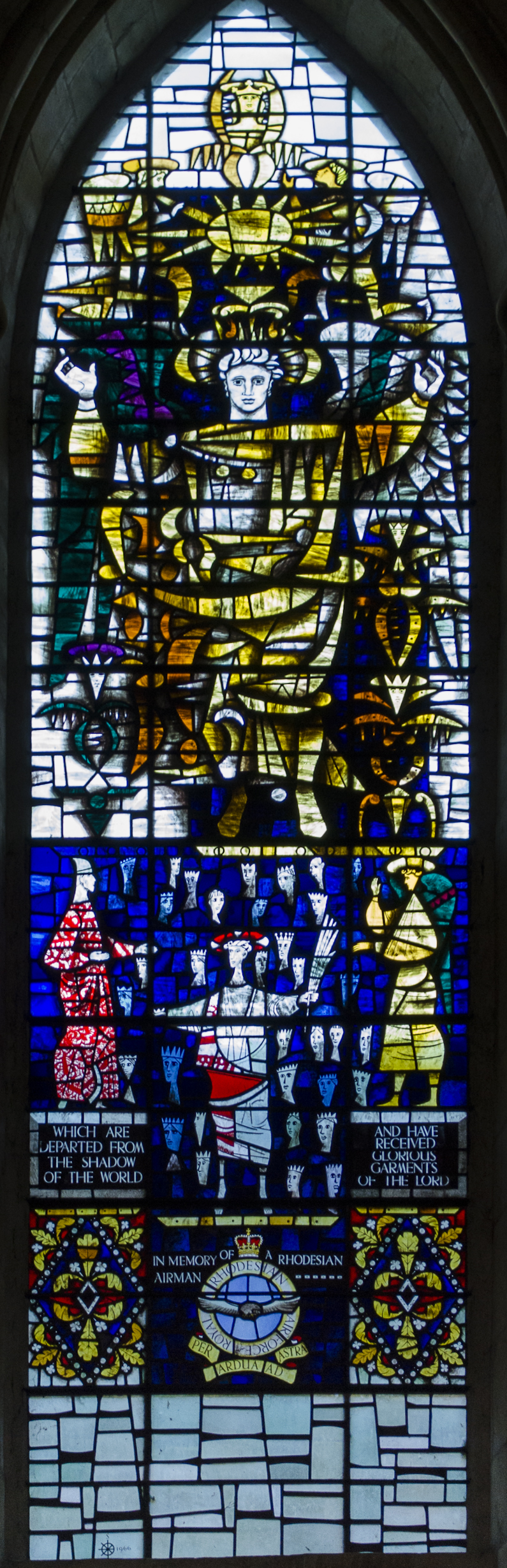
Lincoln Cathedral: RAF chapel - Rhodesian window (1966)

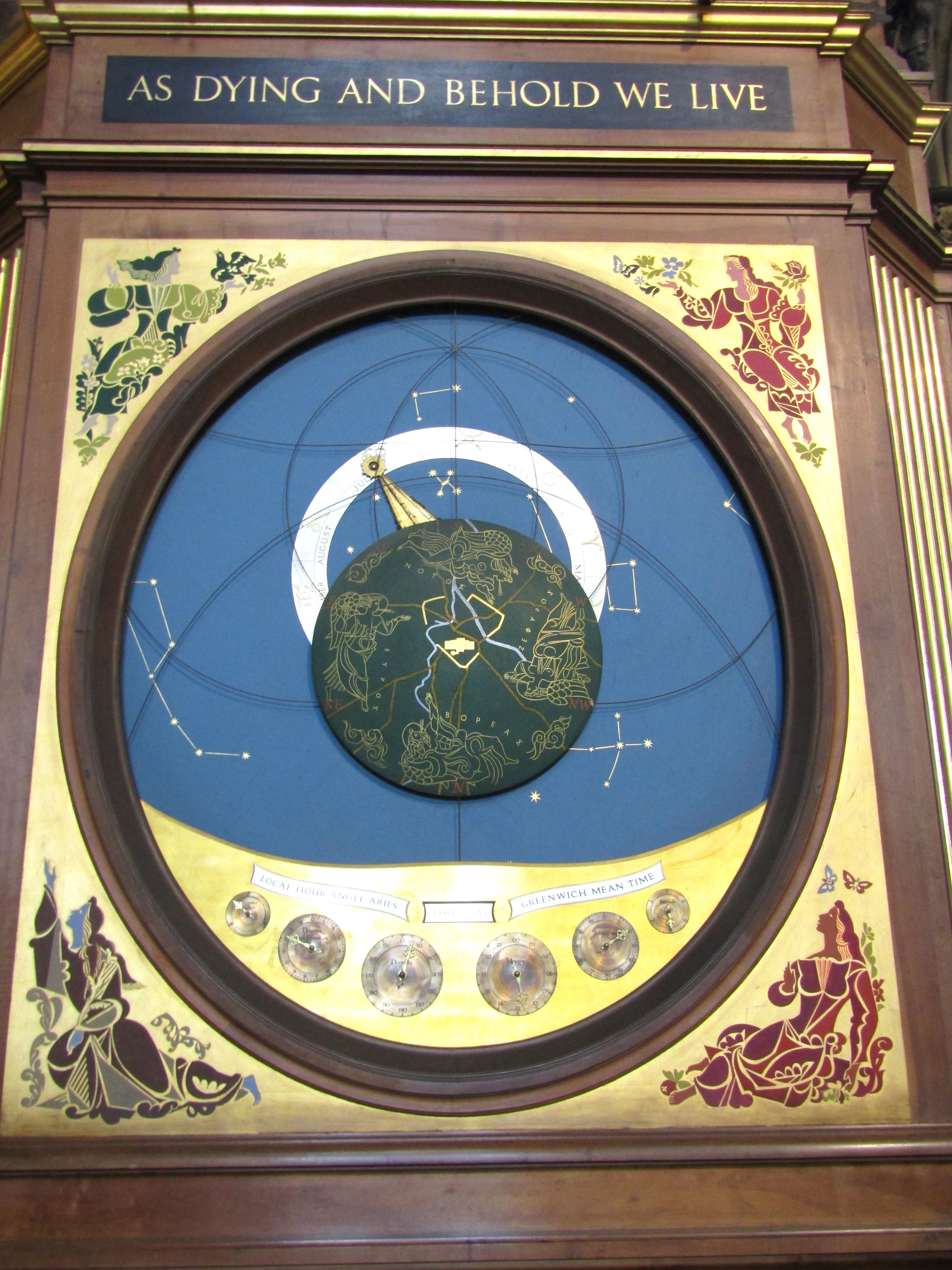
York Minster: astronomical clock (1955)

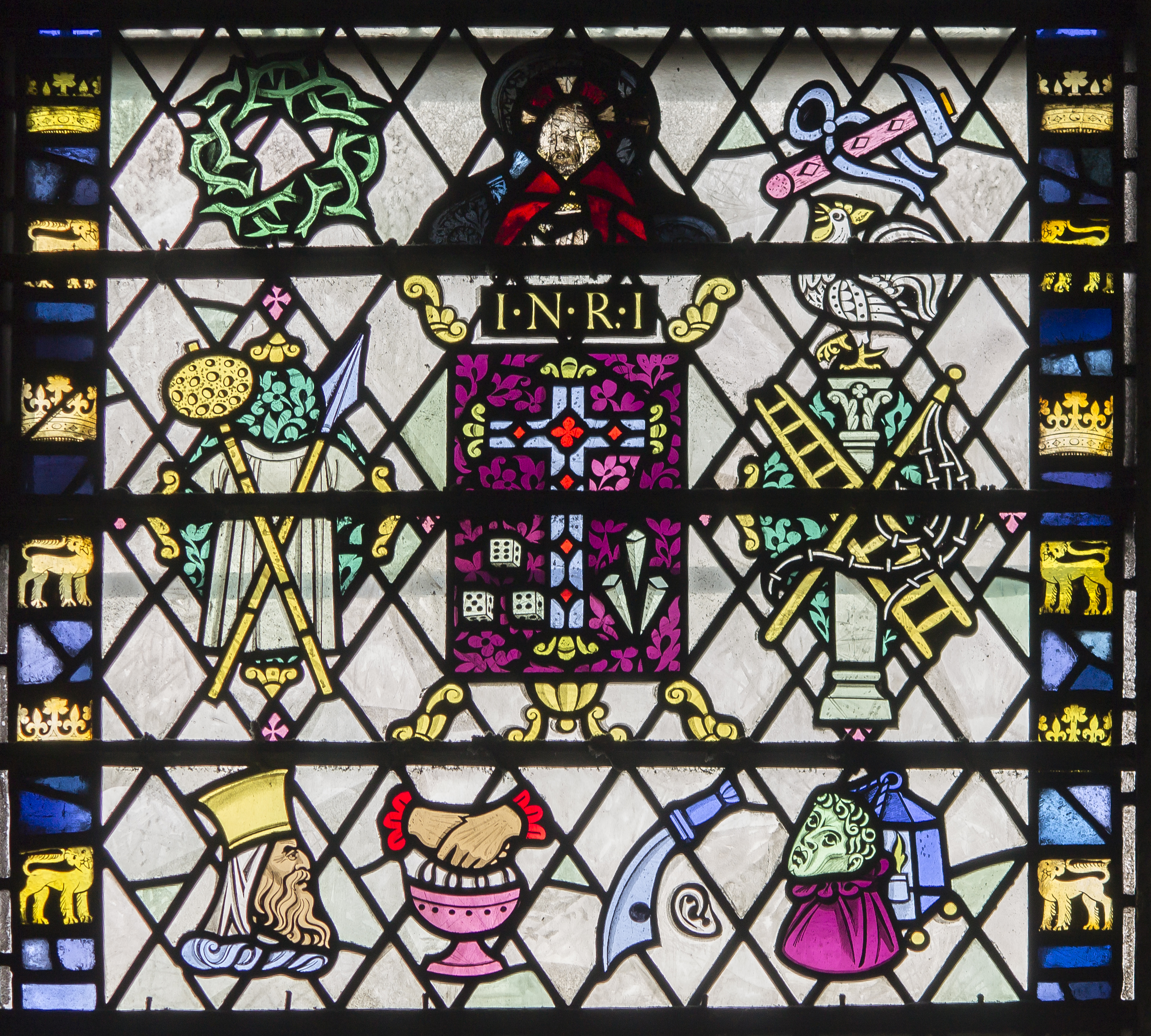
York Minster: Instruments of the Passion panel (1957)

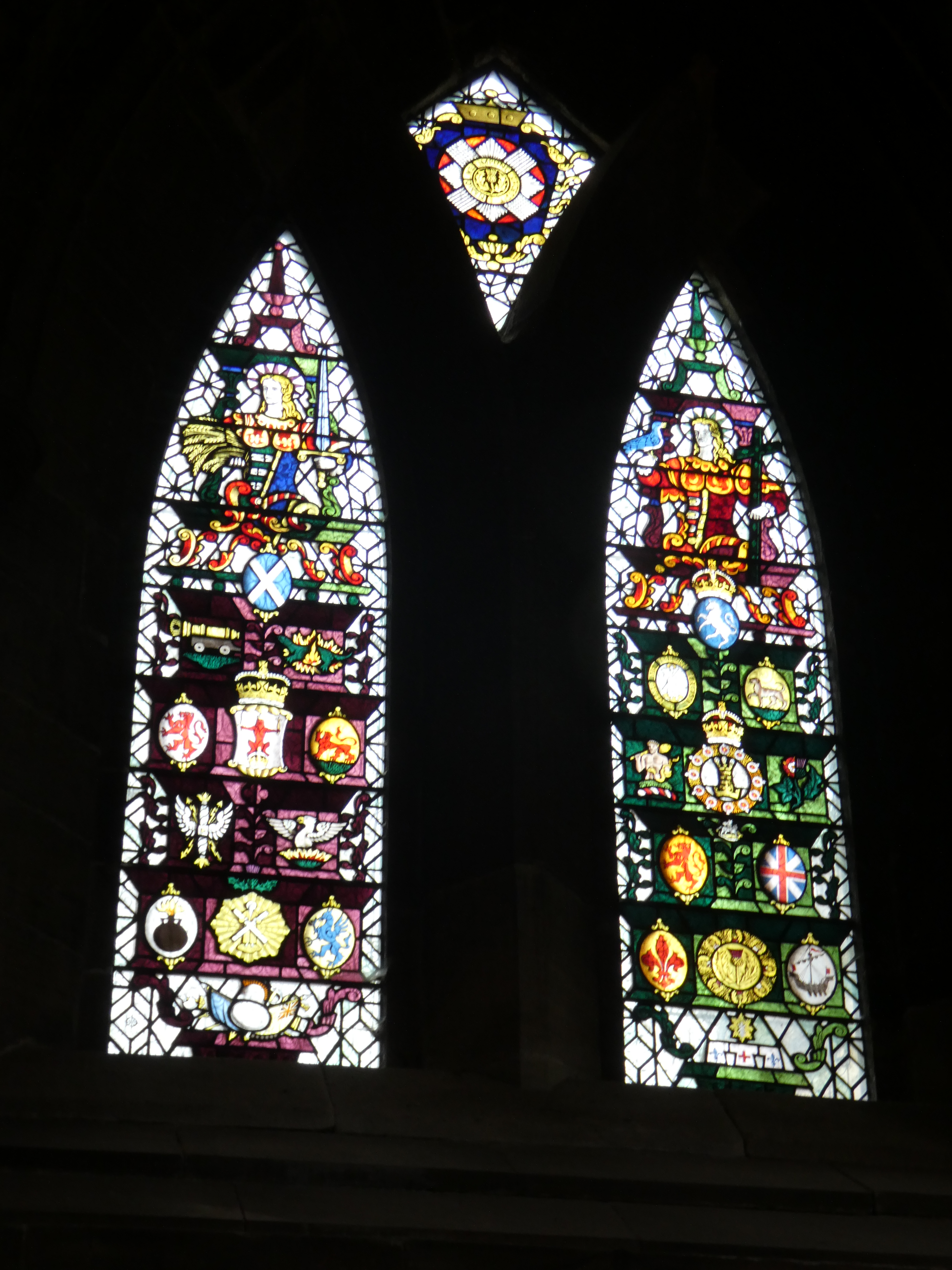
Glasgow Cathedral: Regimental window (1956)

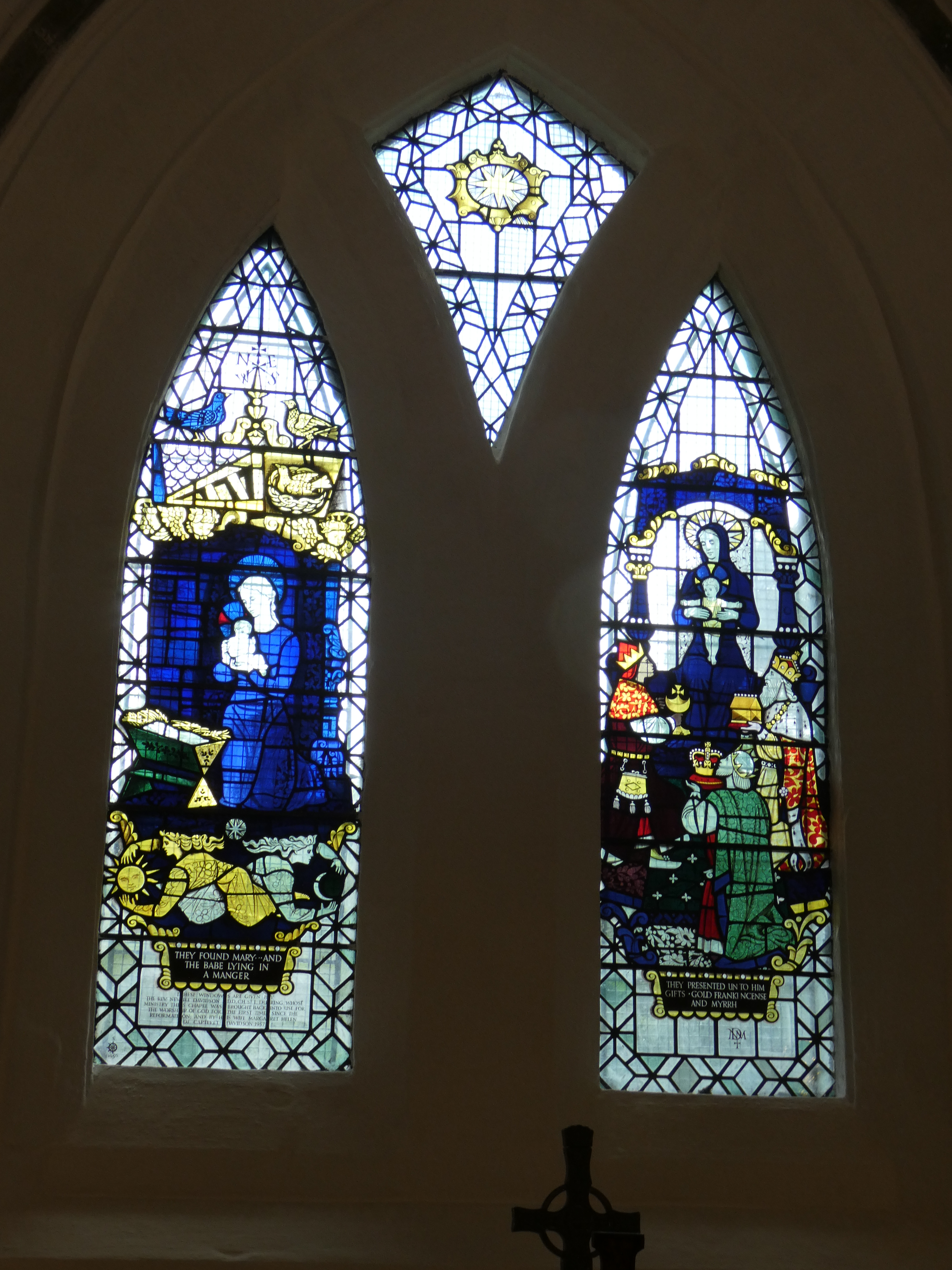
Glasgow Cathedral: Blackadder aisle window (1956–1960)

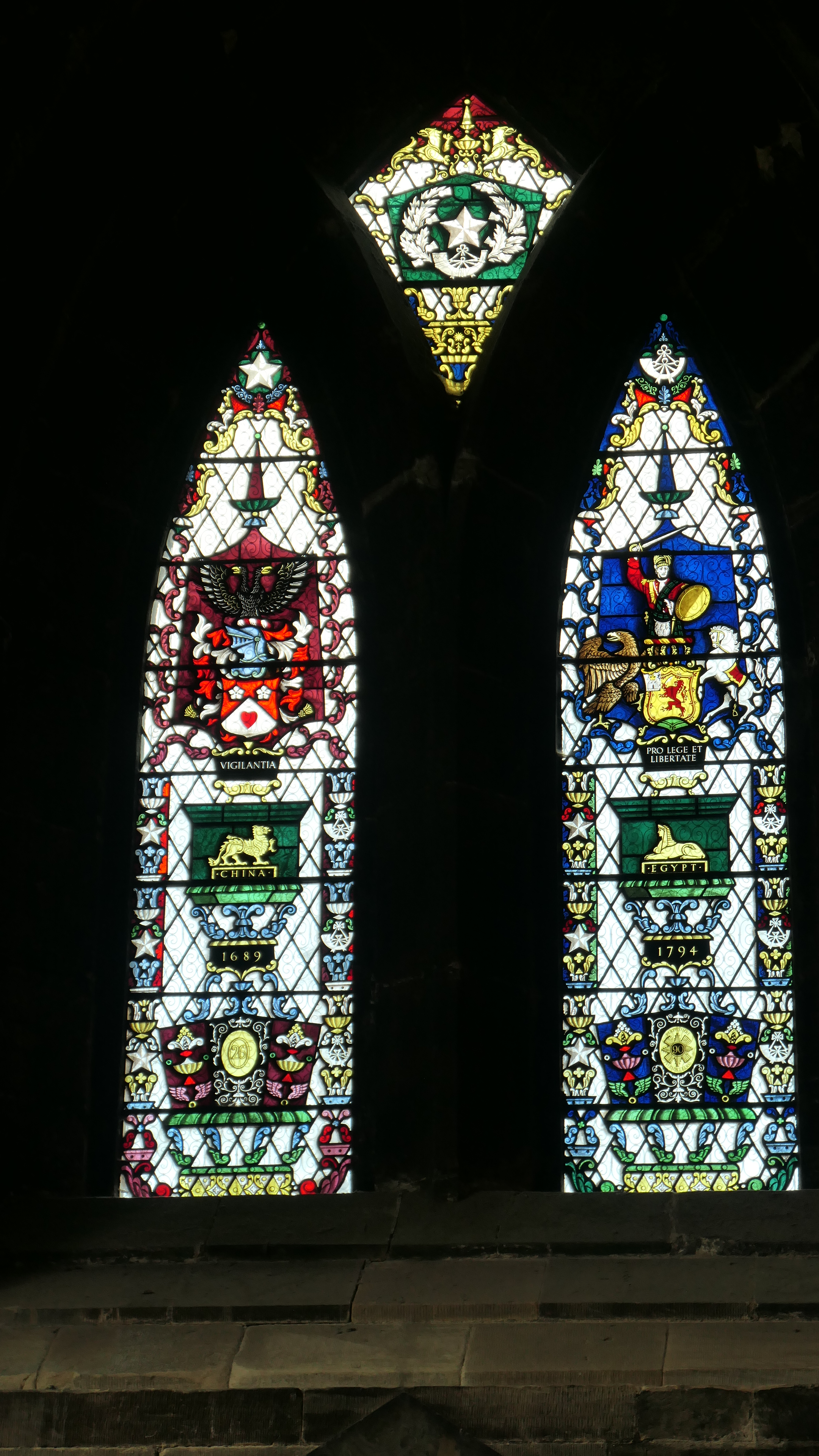
Glasgow Cathedral: Cameroonian Regiment window (1960)

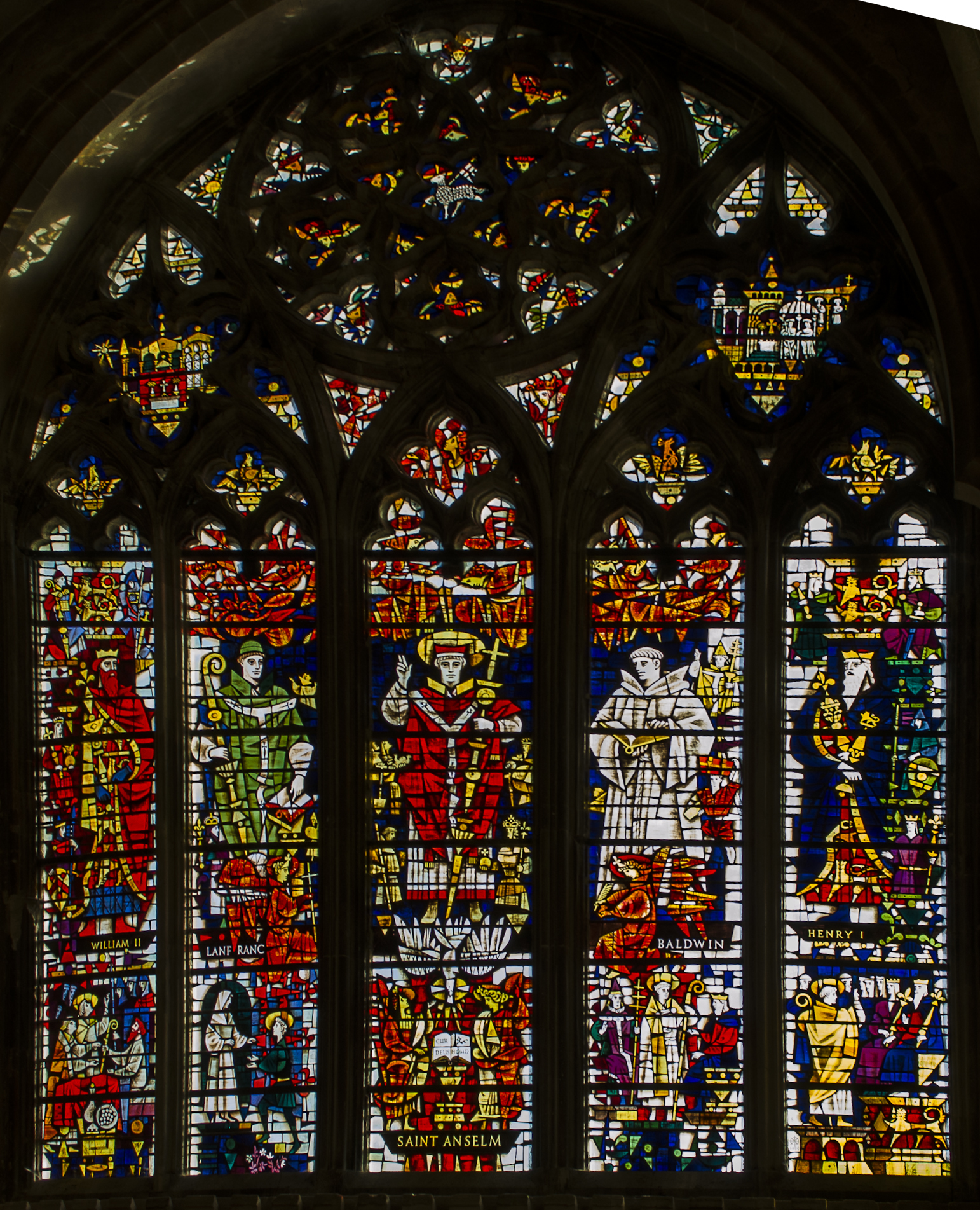
Canterbury Cathedral: Archbishops window (1959)

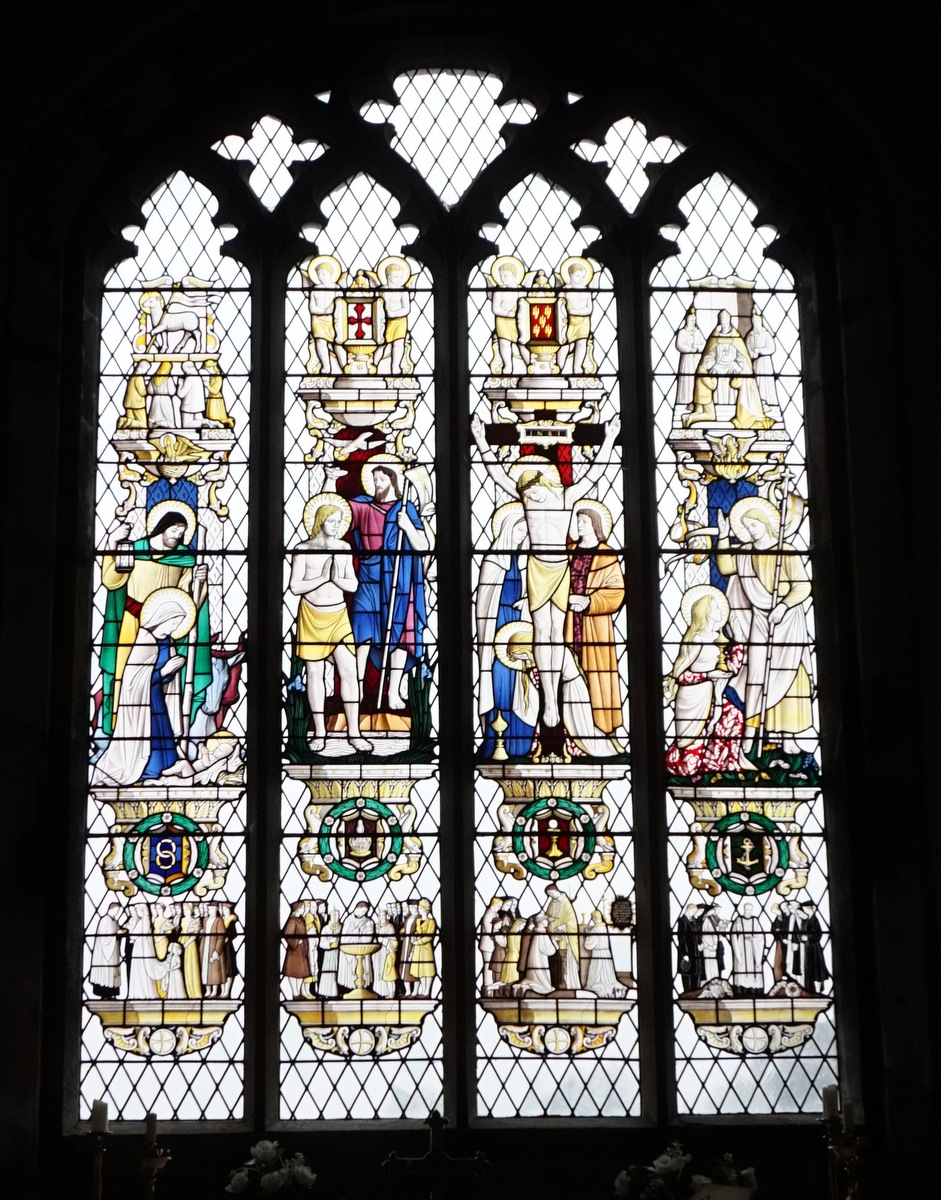
St Bartholomew, Aldbrough: Life of Jesus window (1948)

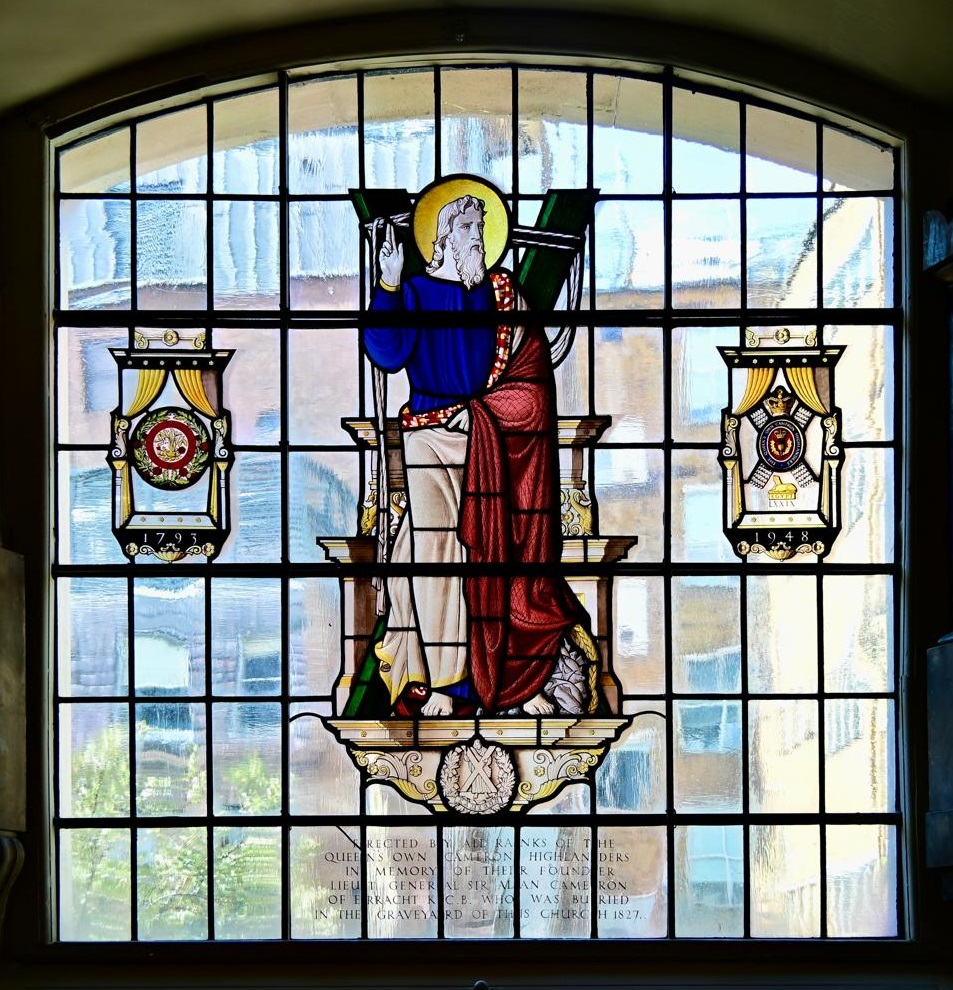
St Marylebone: Cameron Highlanders memorial window (1948)

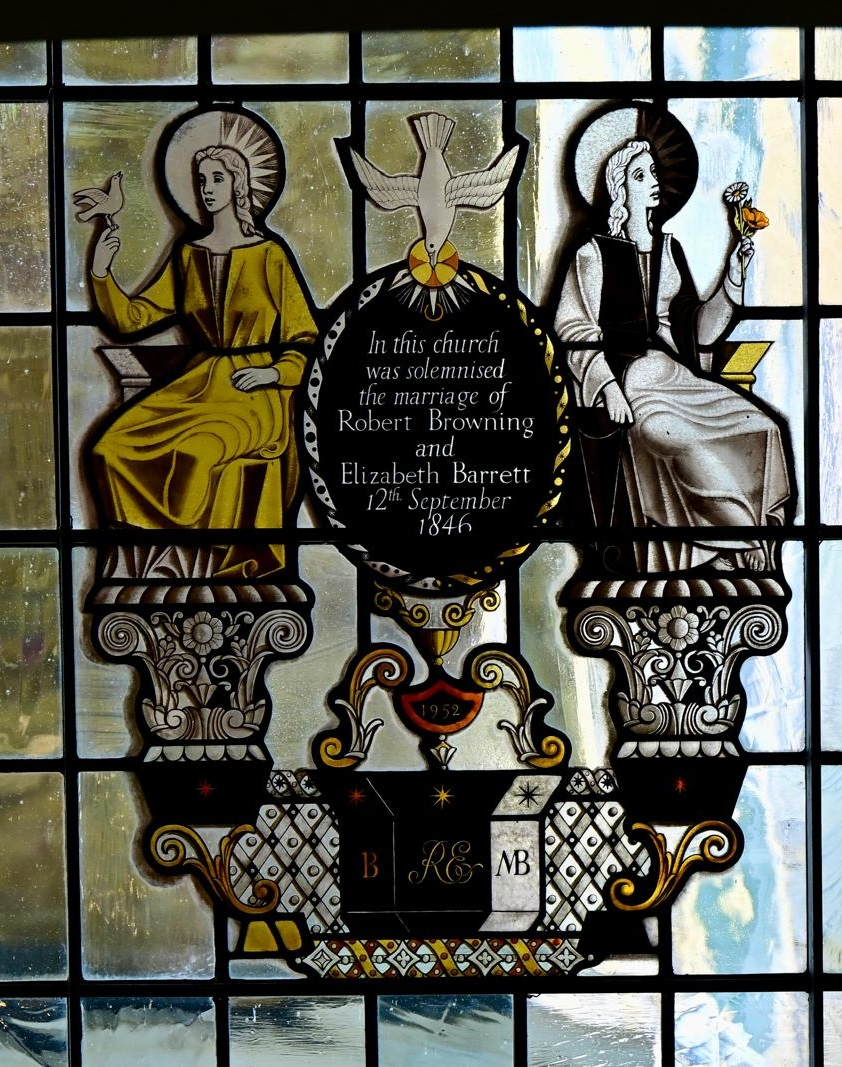
St Marylebone: Browning memorial window (1952)

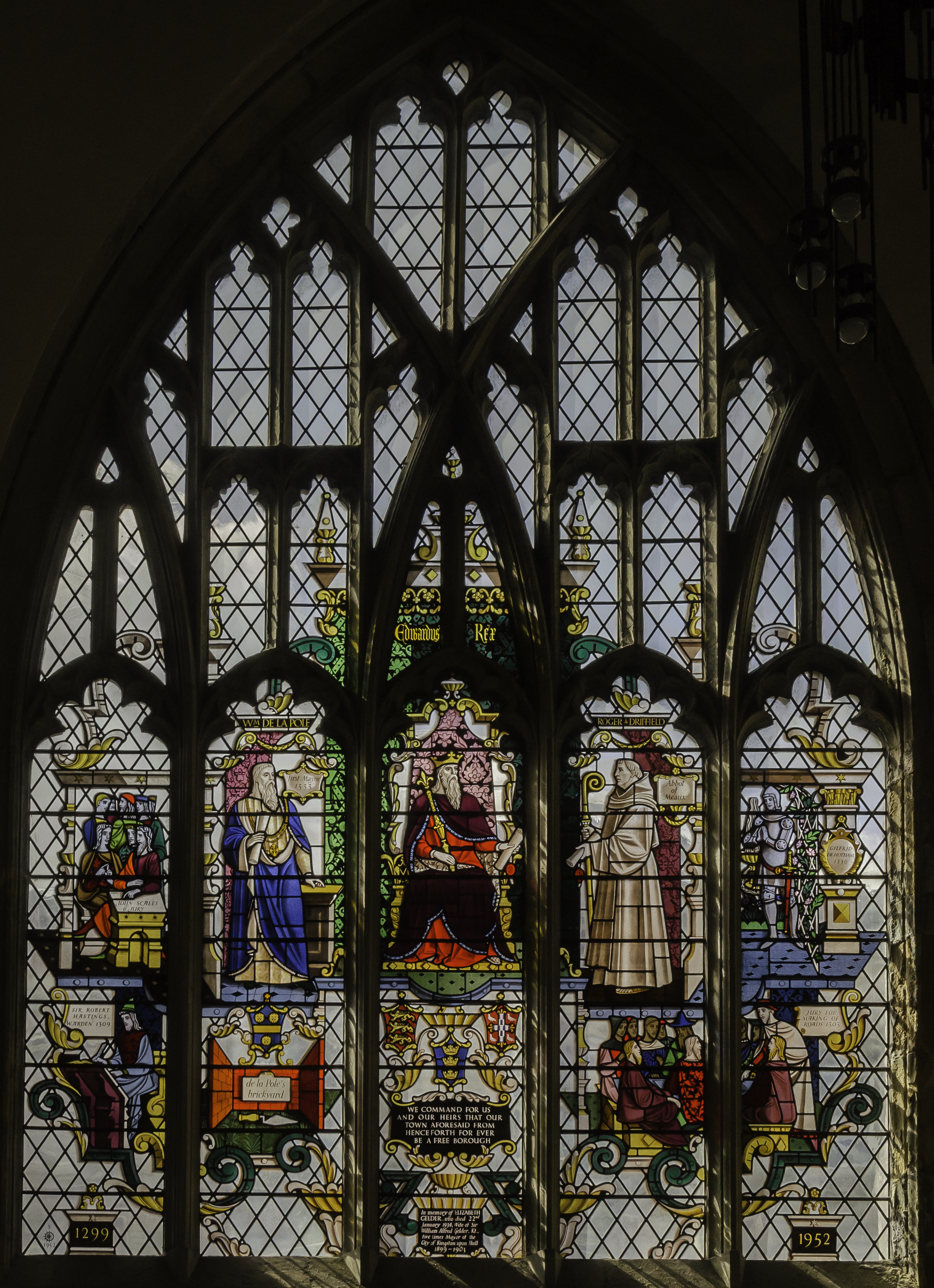
Hull Minster: Elizabeth Gelder window (1952)

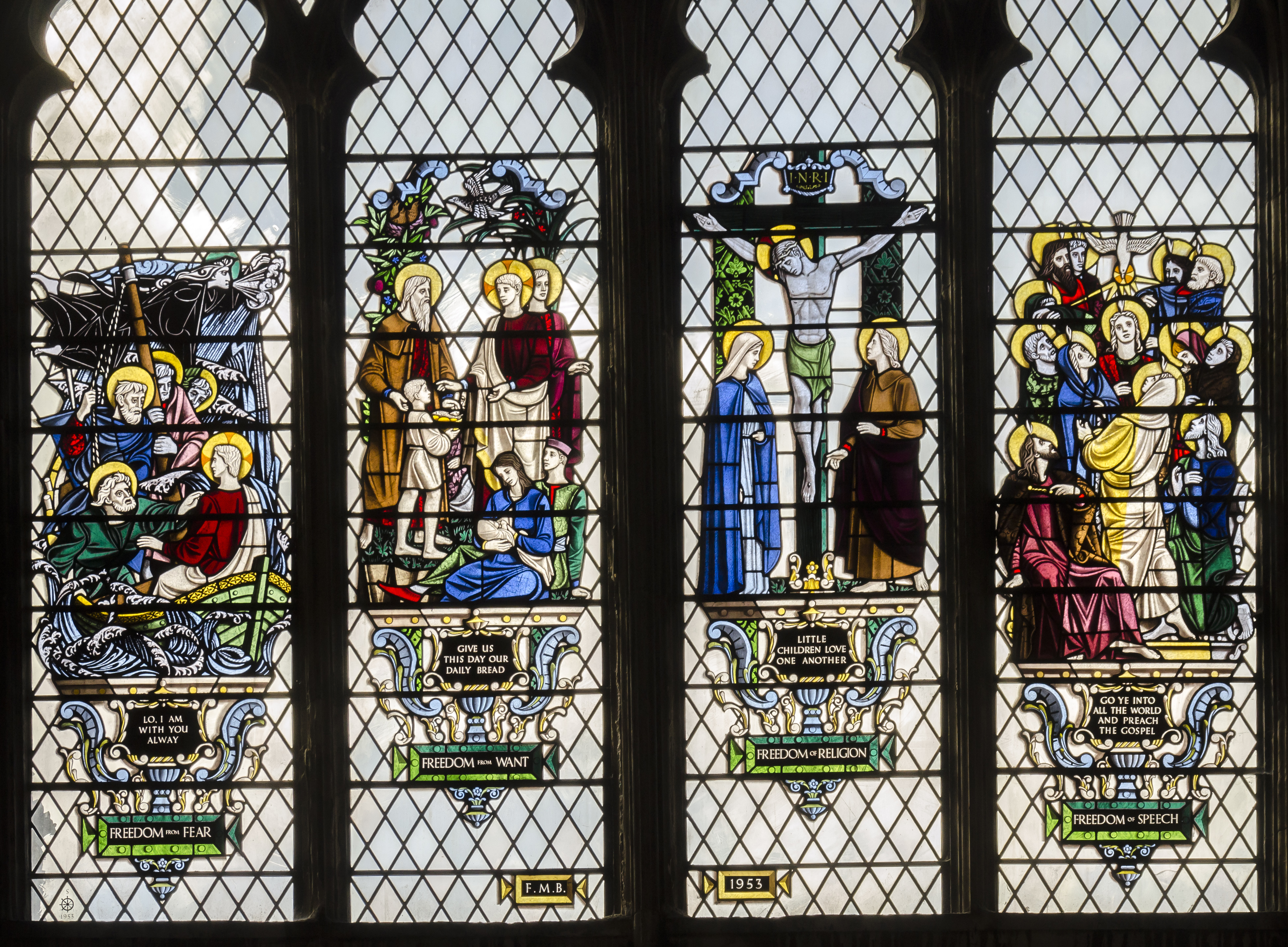
Hull Minster: Freedom window (1953)

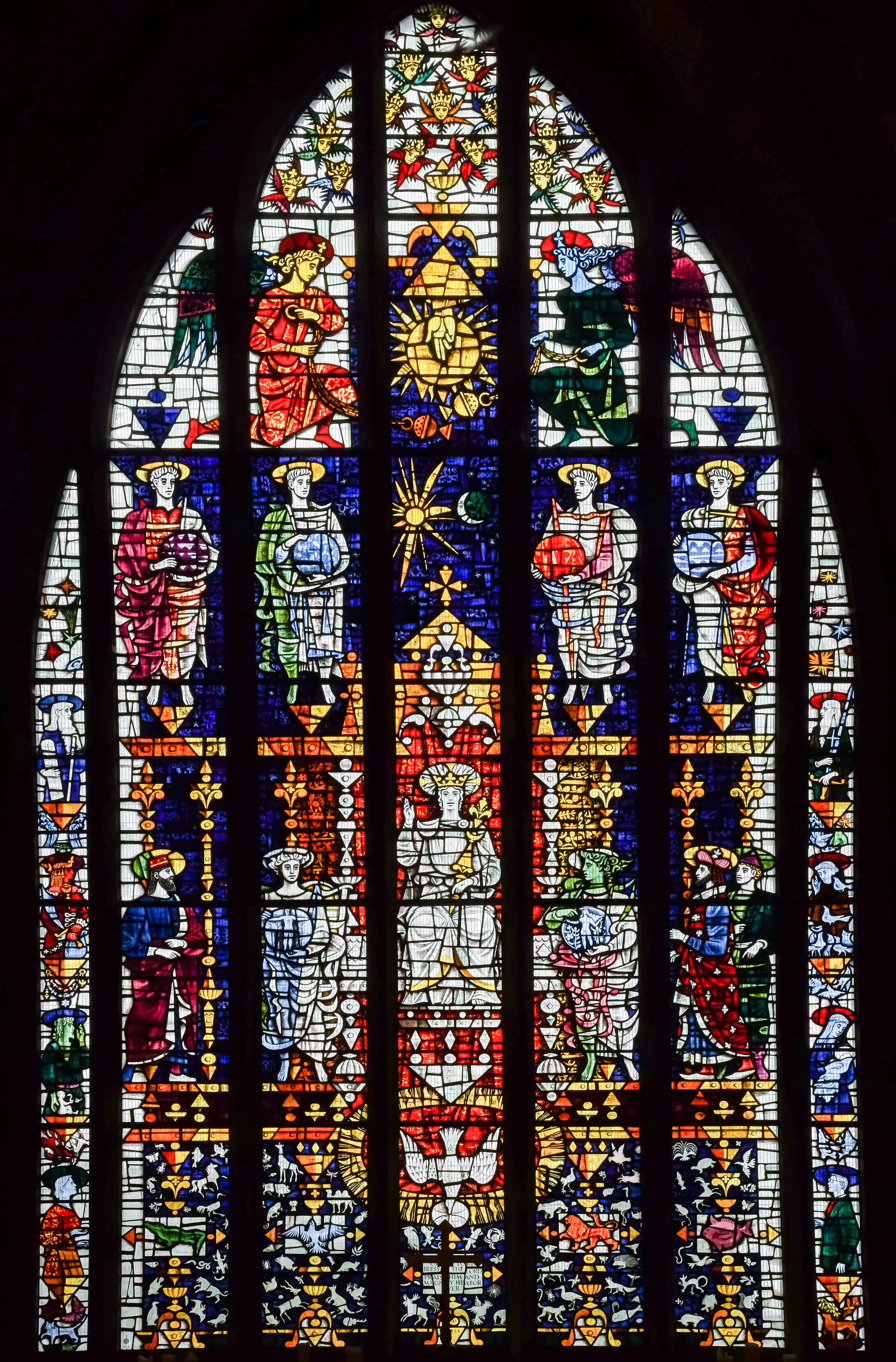
St Mary, Scarborough: East window (1958)

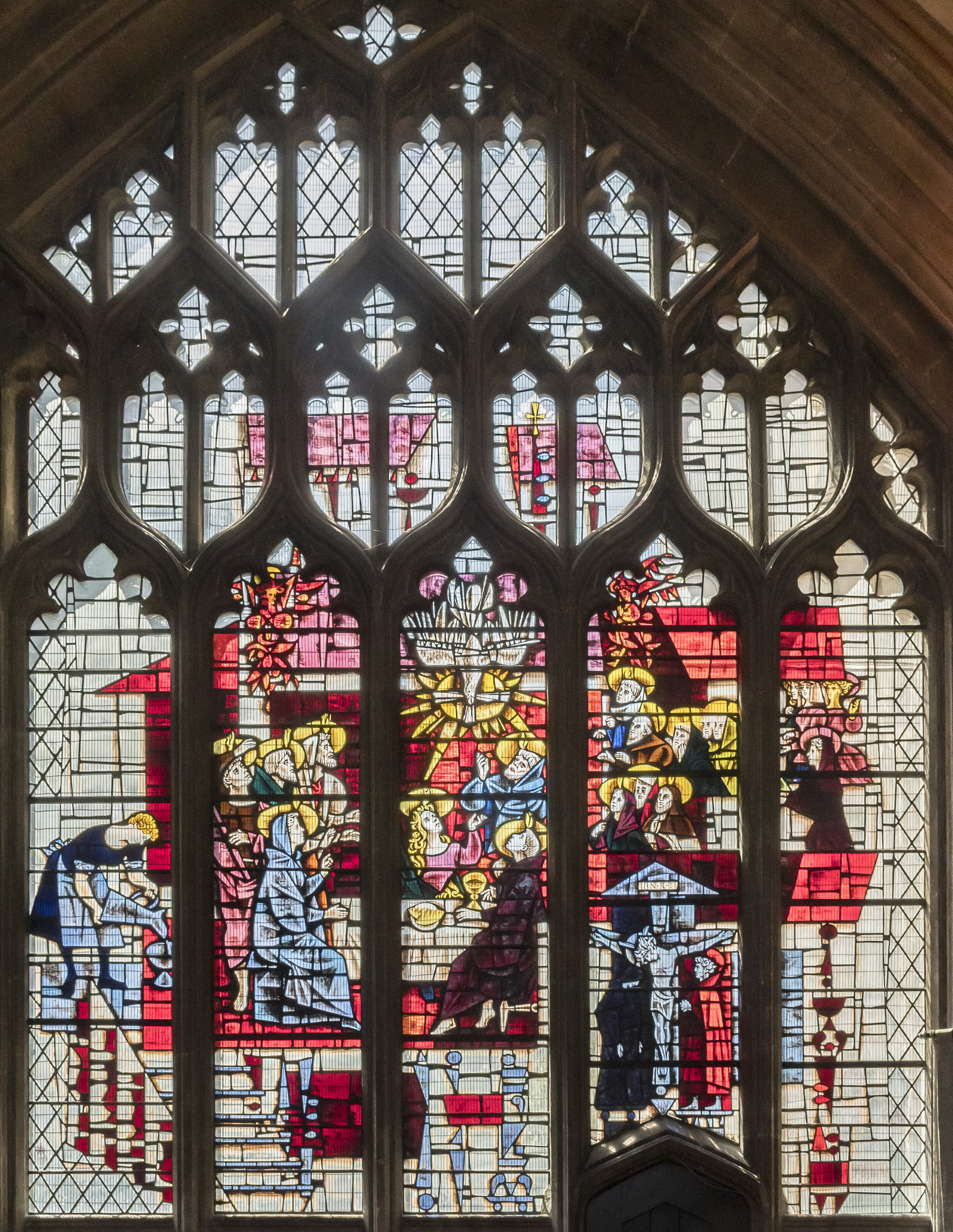
St Mary Redcliffe: Pentecost (1960)

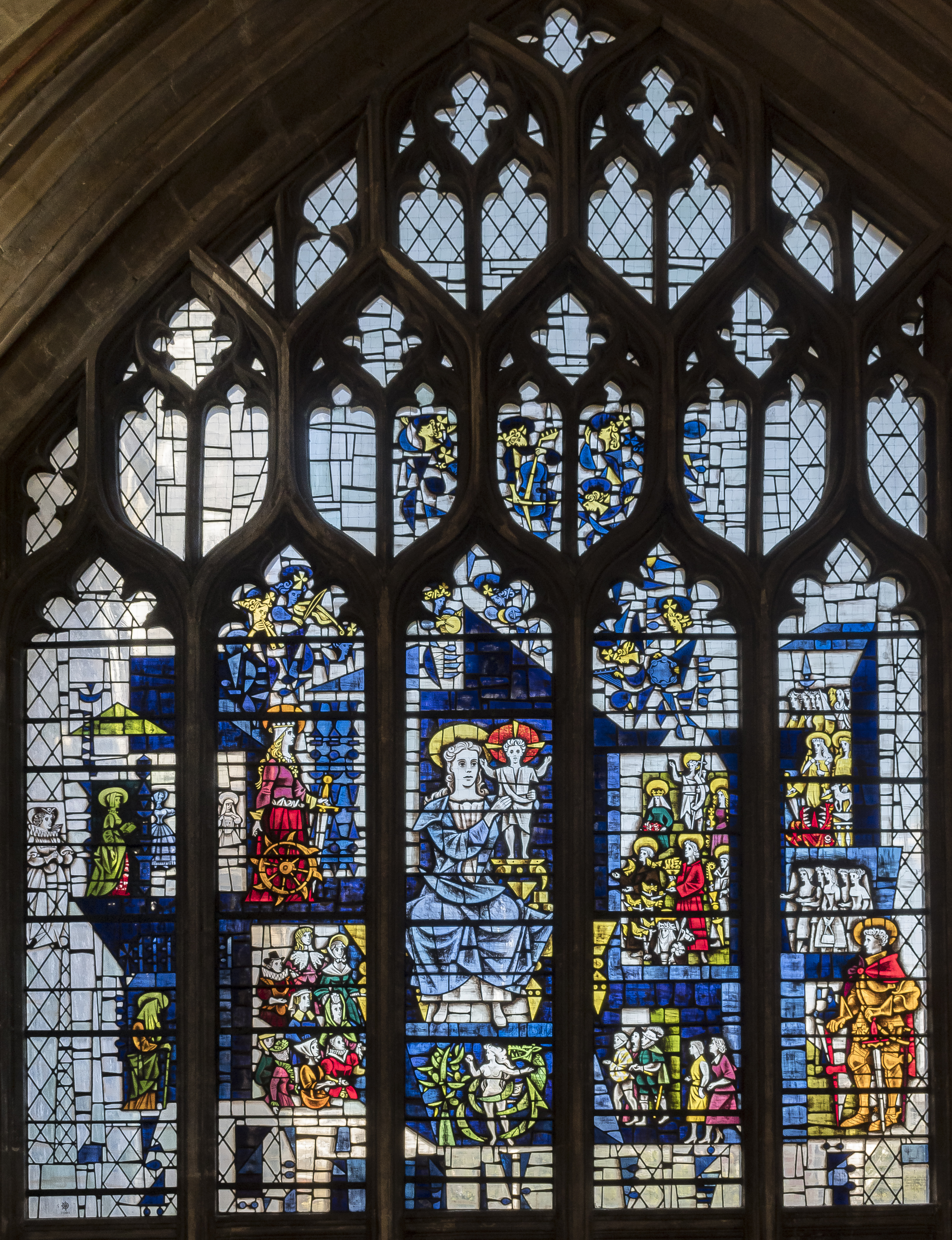
St Mary Redcliffe: Jesus presented as Saviour of the World (1961)

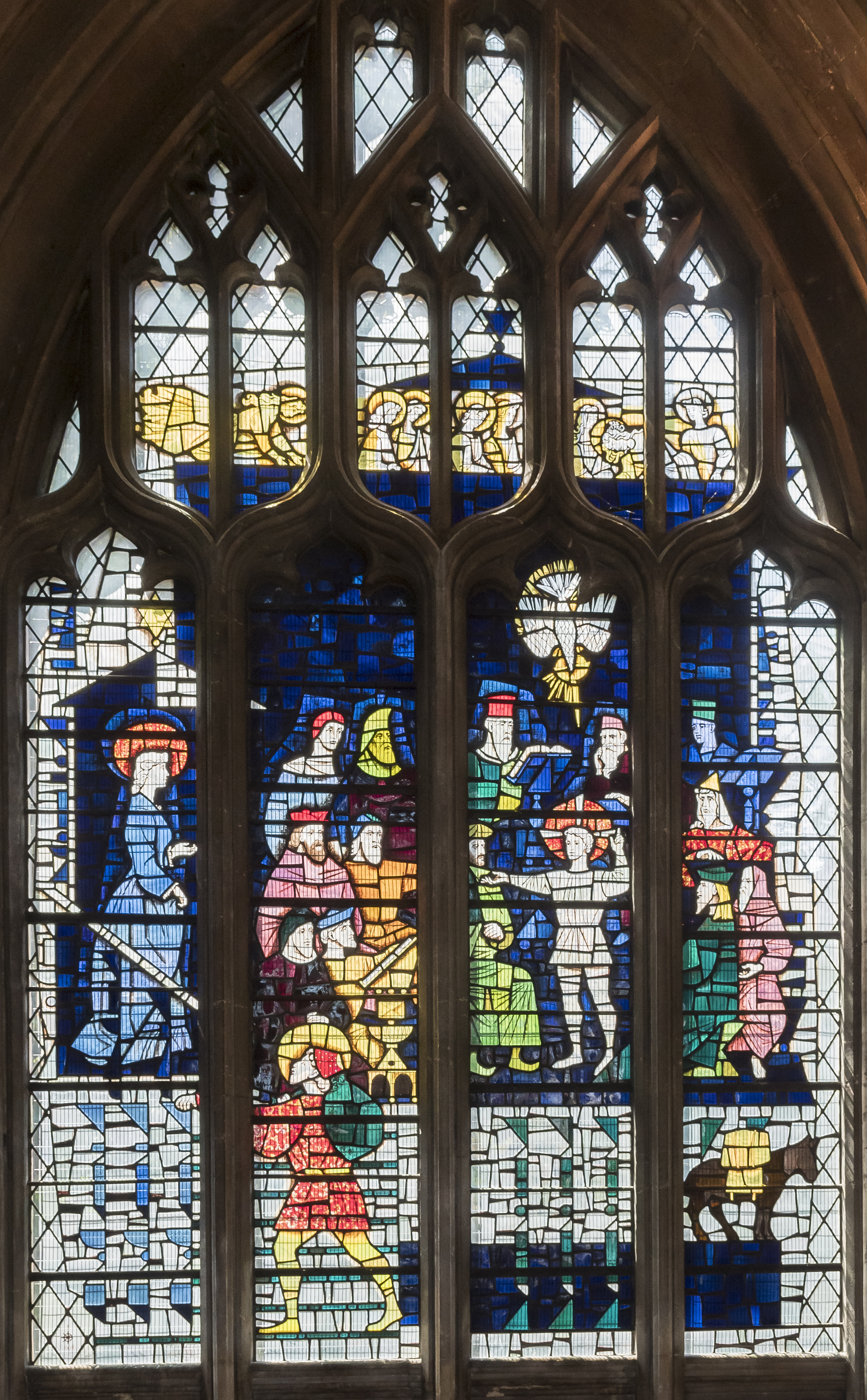
St Mary Redcliffe: Jesus in the Temple (1964)

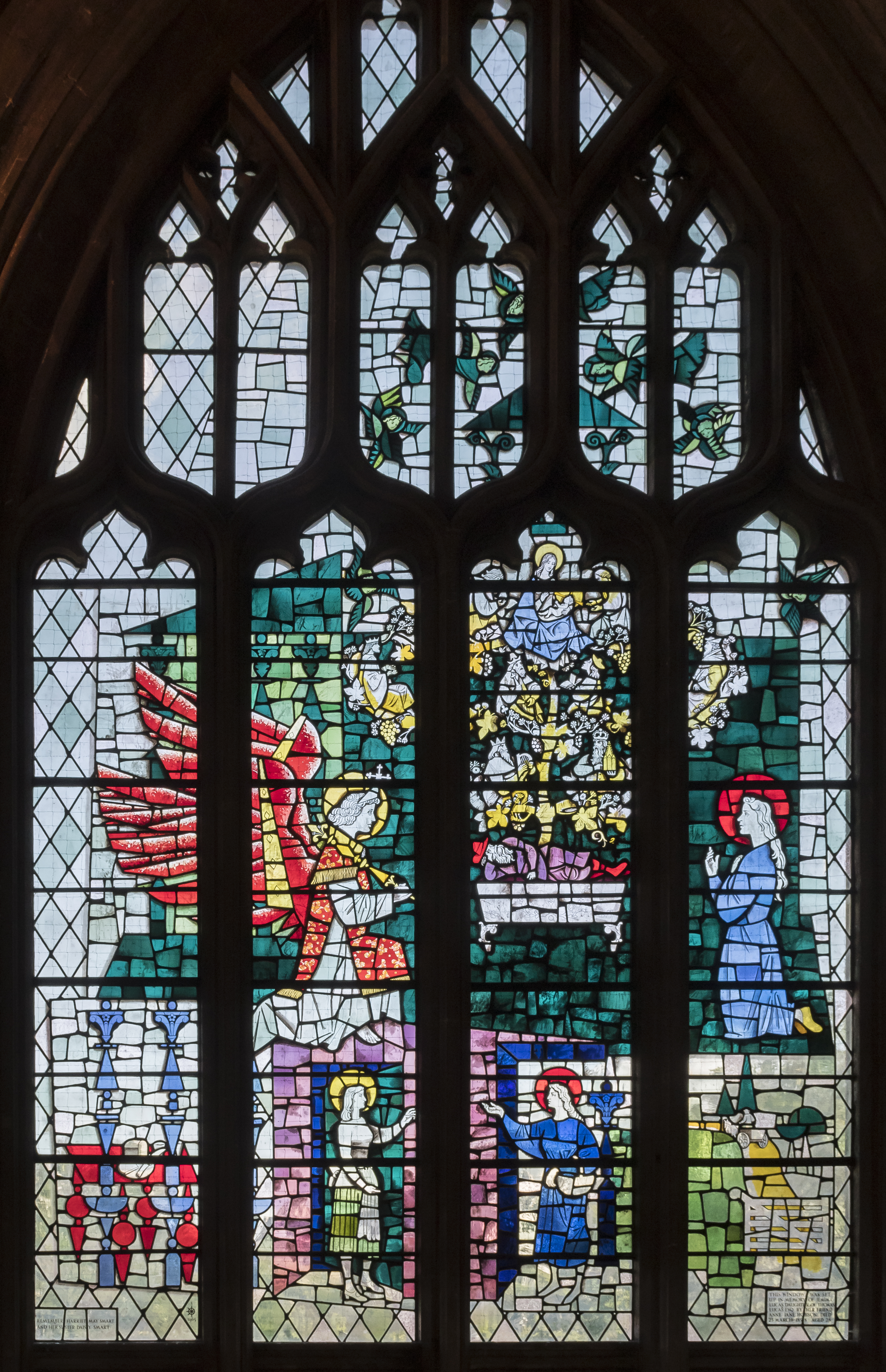
St Mary Redcliffe: Annunciation (1965)

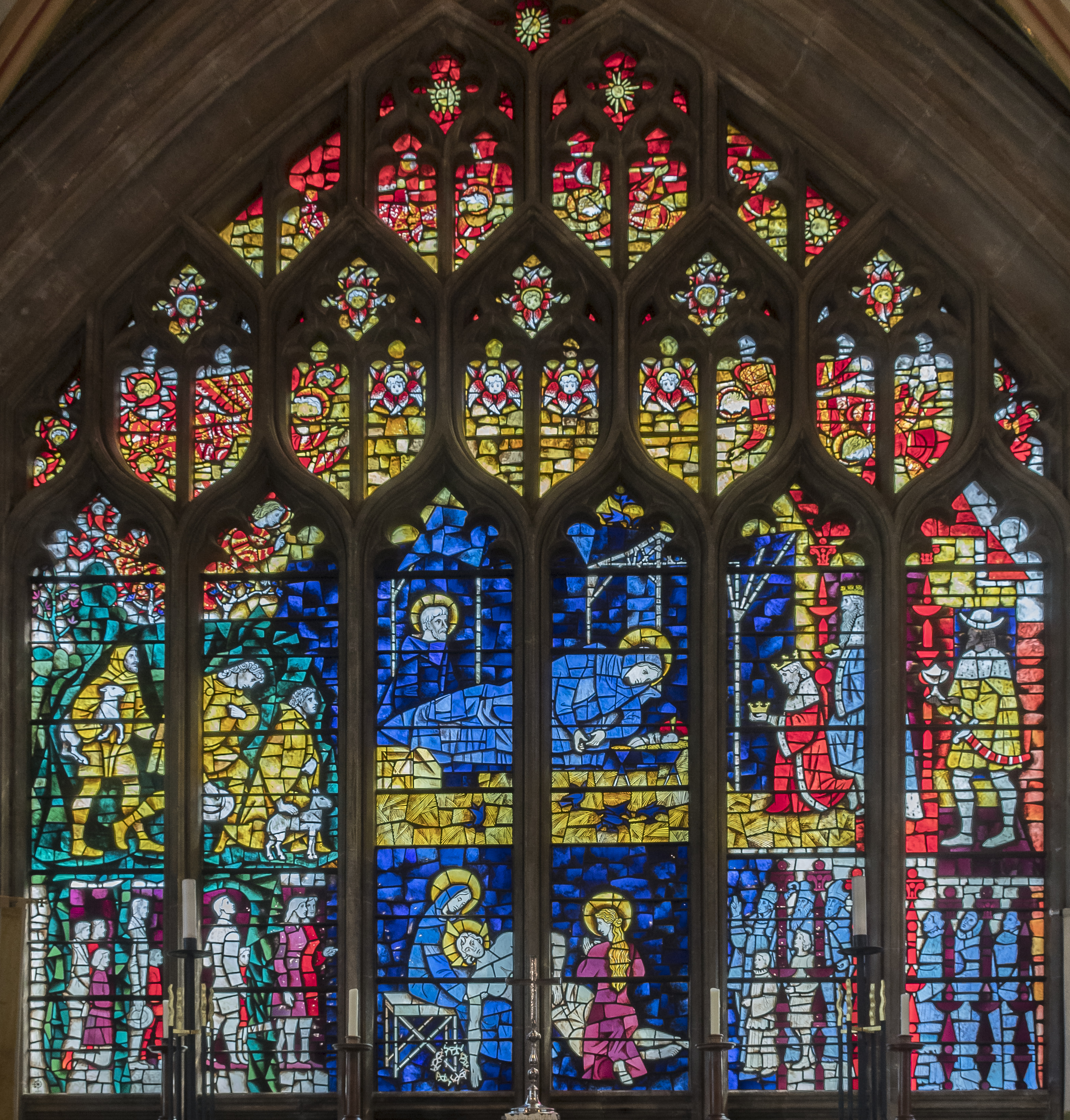
St Mary Redcliffe: Nativity and Pieta (1966)

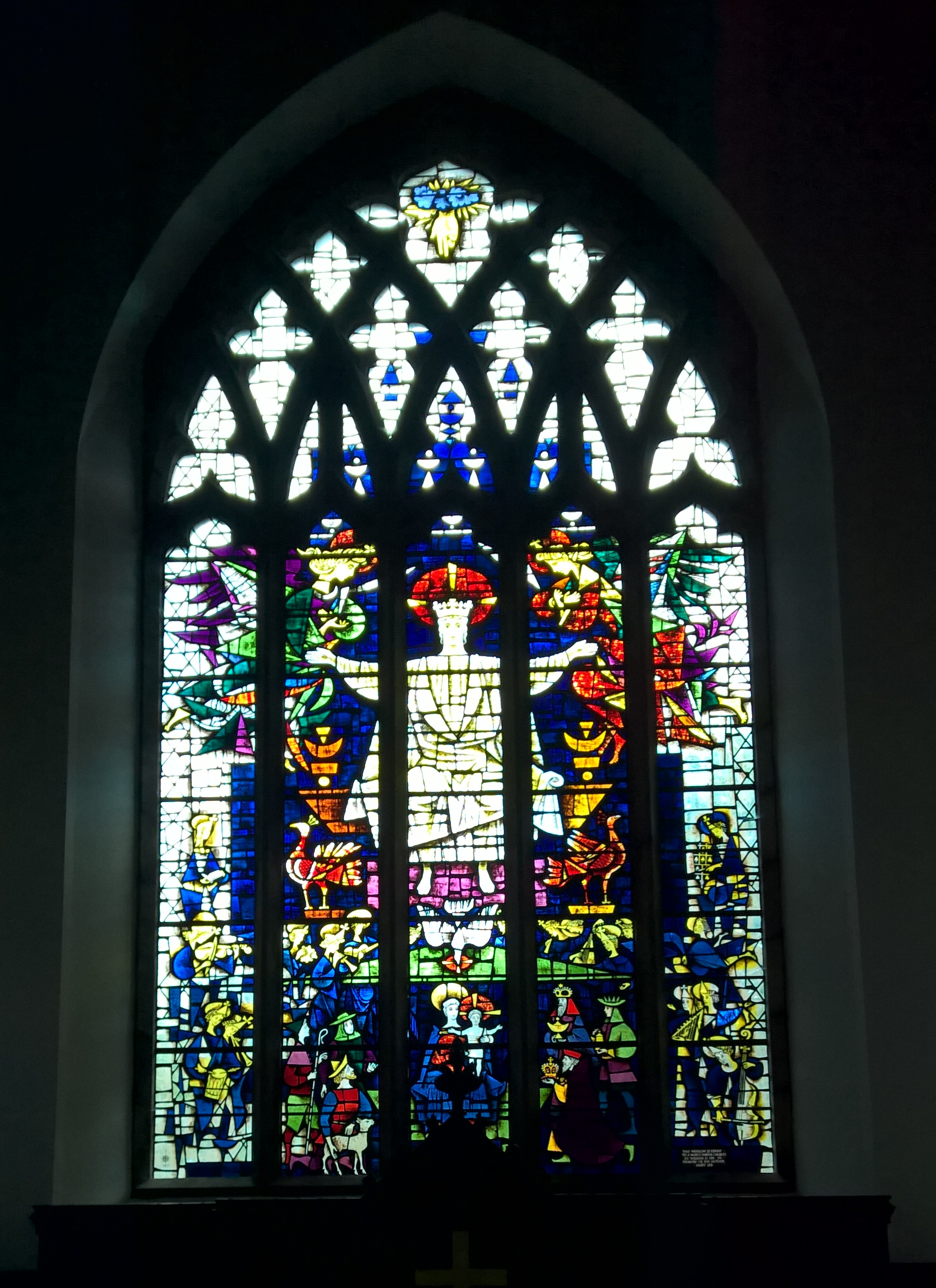
St Mary, Wooler: East window (1962)

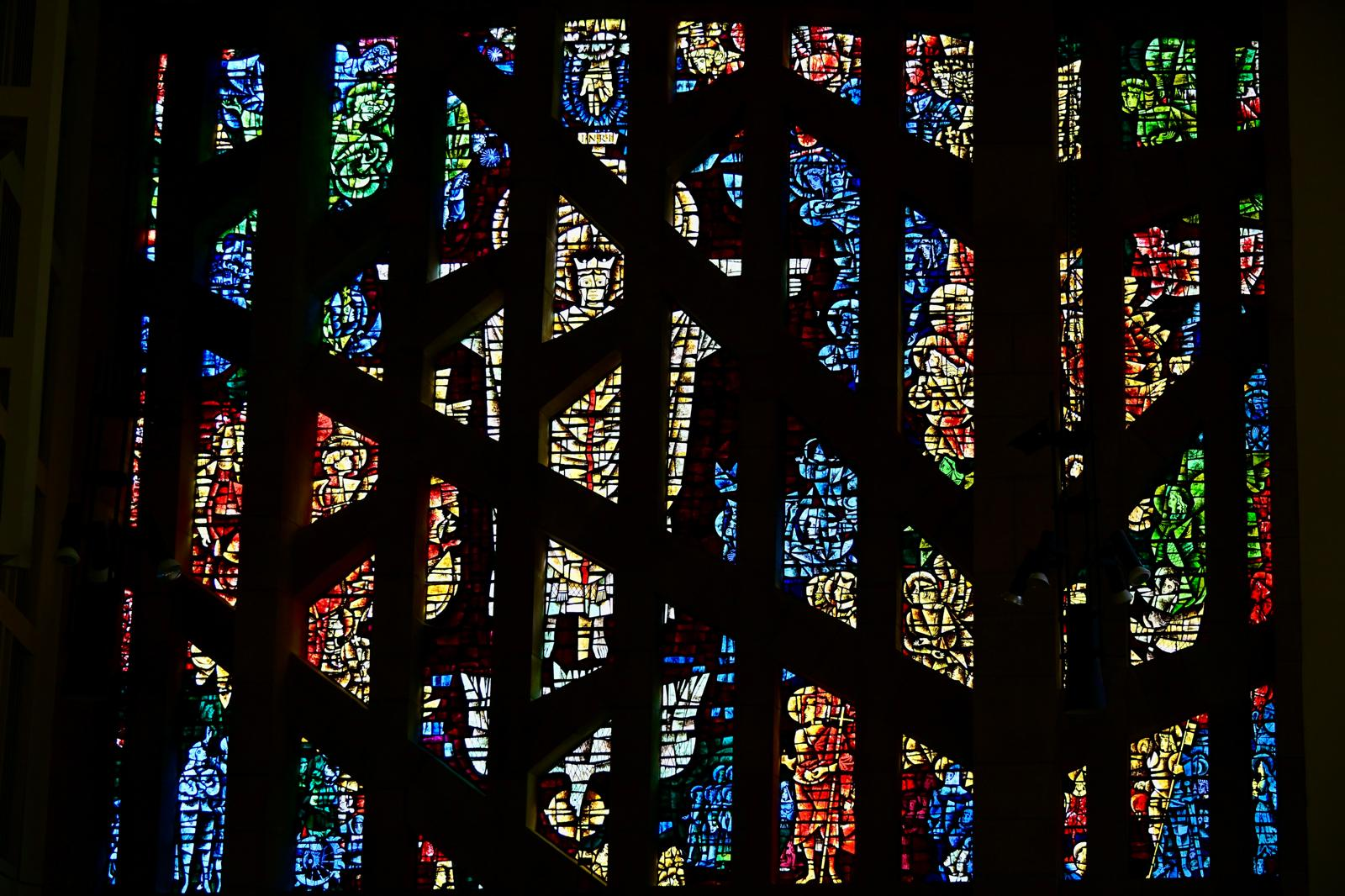
St Mark, Broomhill: East window (1963)

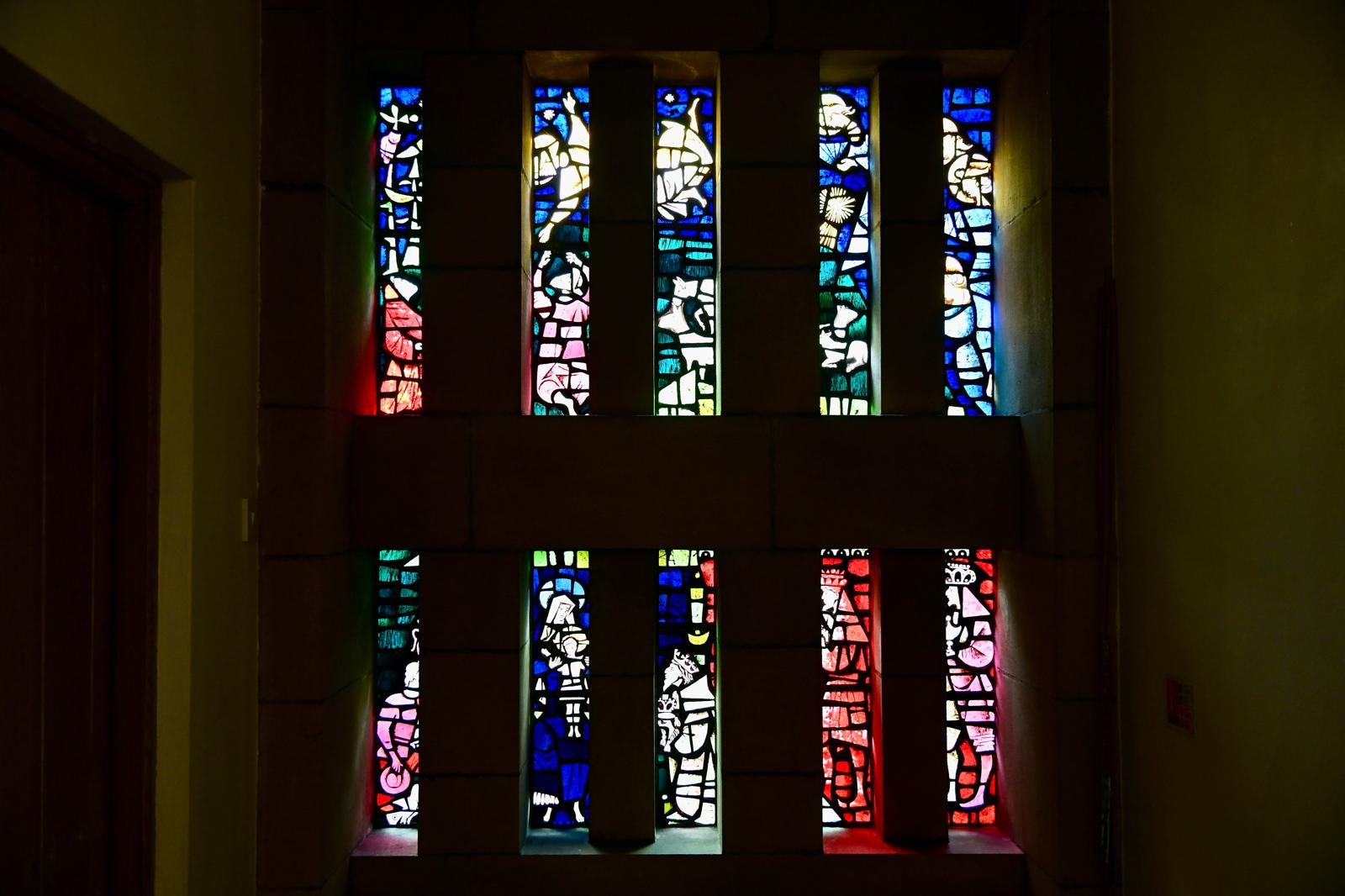
St Mark, Broomhill: Lancet windows (1963)

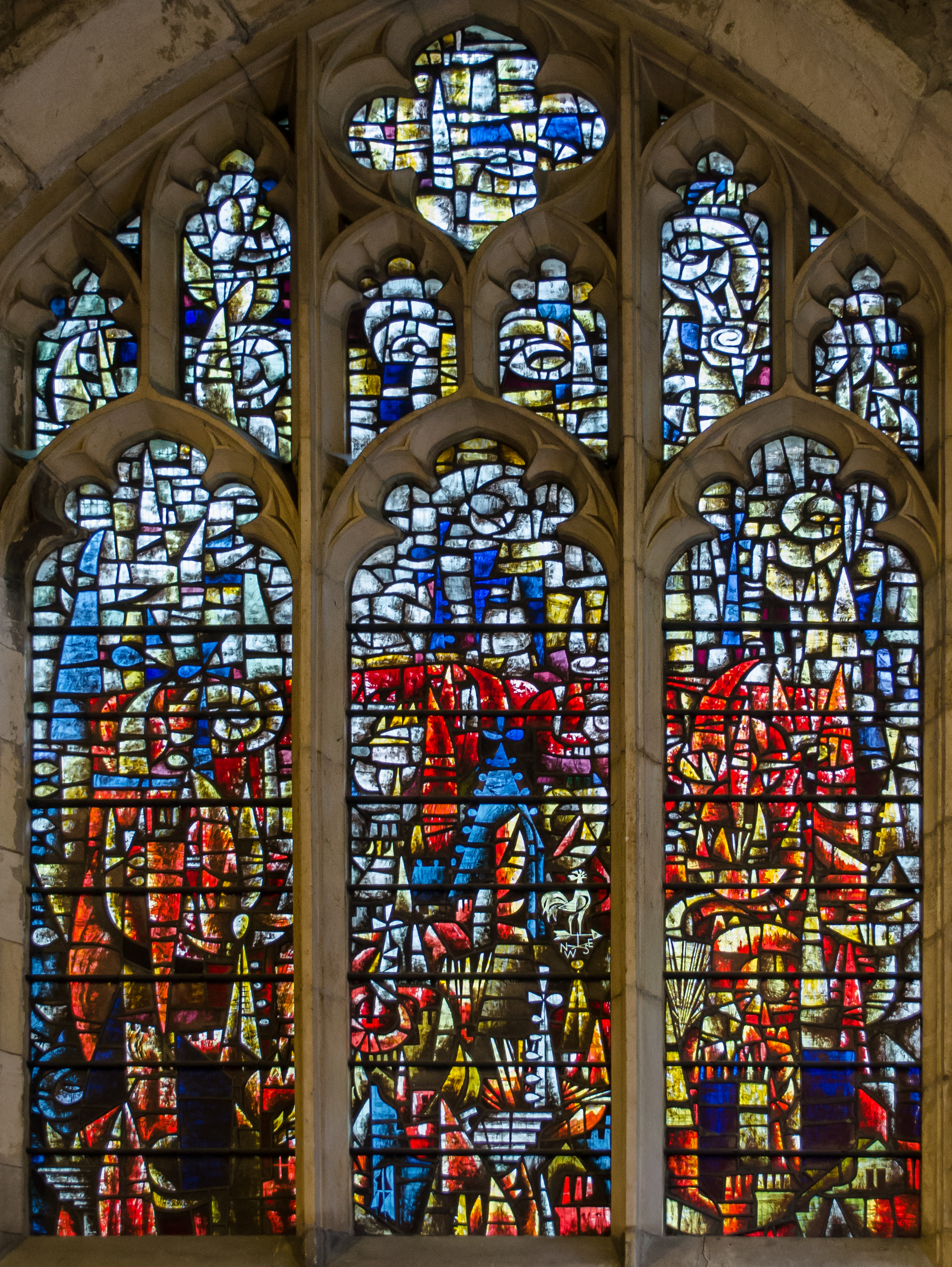
St Martin le Grand, York: York Blitz window (1963)

St Michael on the Mount Without, Bristol: East window (1964)

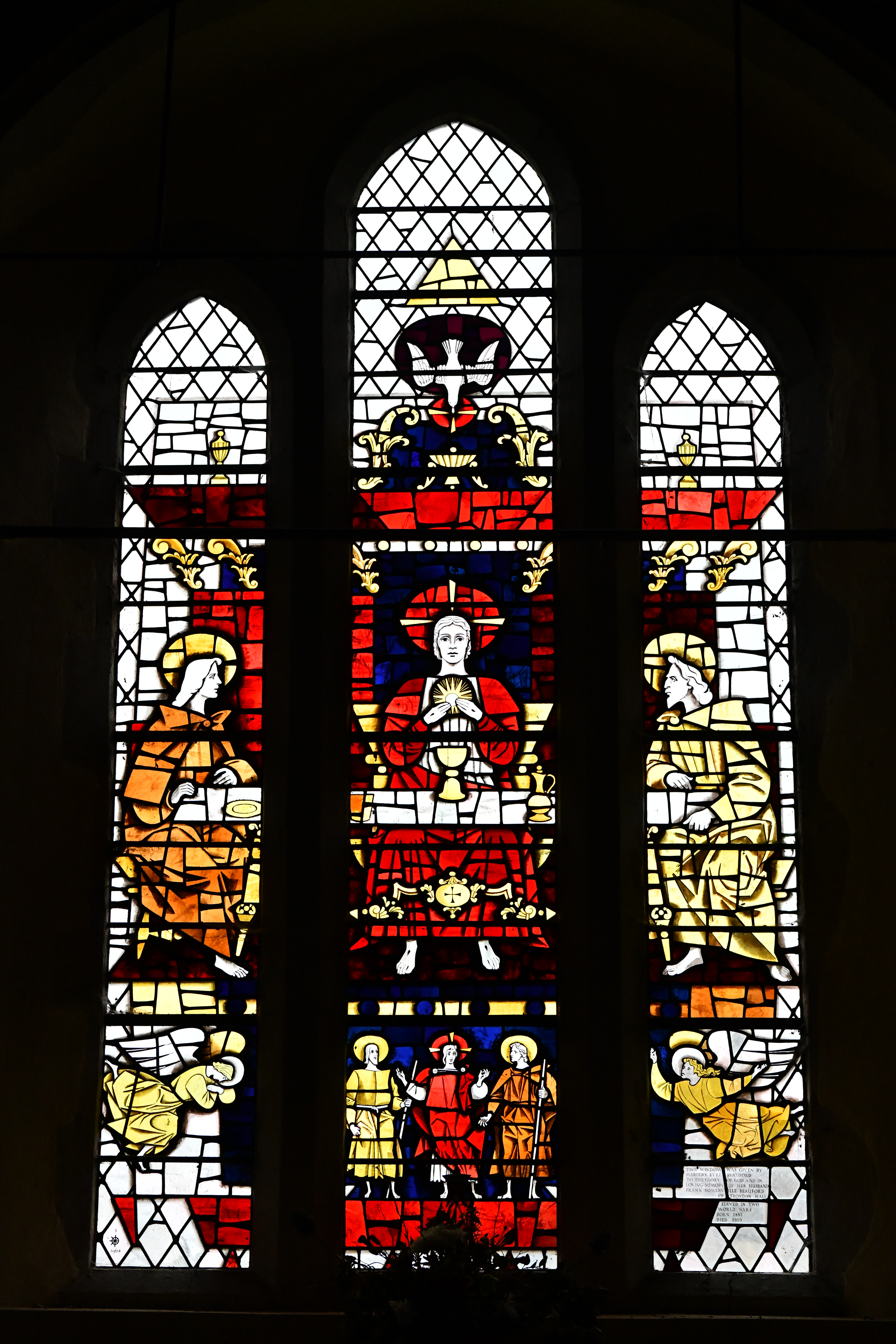
St Mary, Troston: East window (1964)
