= St Mary's Church, Scarborough =

Anglican church in Scarborough, North Yorkshire, England

Coordinates: 54.28684°N 0.39322°W

- St Mary's Church, Scarborough
- St Mary's Church, Scarborough
- OS grid reference: TA 04680 89064
- Location: Scarborough, North Yorkshire
- Country: England
- Denomination: Church of England
- Previous denomination: Roman Catholic
- Churchmanship: Open Evangelical / Traditional Anglican
- Website: https://www.stmaryswithholyapostles.com/

Architecture
- Heritage designation: Grade I listed
- Groundbreaking: 12th century

Administration
- Diocese: York
- Archdeaconry: East Riding
- Deanery: Scarborough
- Parish: St Mary's with Holy Apostles

Clergy
- Vicar: Revd Samantha Tredwell

St Mary's Church is a parish church in Scarborough, North Yorkshire, in the Church of England. It stands high above the old town, just below Scarborough Castle.

== History ==
The church was built in the 12th century. It was once a large church with two towers (west and central), but was largely destroyed during the siege of Scarborough Castle in the English Civil War. The church was rebuilt in the late 17th century and restored in the mid 19th century. The building now has a square tower at the east end, replacing the former central tower, and a series of stone vaulted side chapels on the south side. The internal walls are almost covered with late 18th century and early 19th-century wall monuments, including one by Roubiliac to Elizabeth Craven.

The chancel was rebuilt c.1450 and subsequently destroyed in the Civil War, with some remains on the east end. During the Civil War, the churchyard was used as a base to fire cannons at the castle, with the castle returning fire. The tower collapsed in 1645 and was rebuilt in 1670. The church was heavily restored in the 19th century and is now about half the size it once was.

The large seven-light east window was designed and manufactured by York-based master glassmaker Harry Stammers and installed in 1958. On the theme of the Benedicite, it depicts the totality of creation praising its maker.

== Graveyard ==
The church has a large graveyard, with tombs mainly of the 18th and 19th centuries. A much-visited grave is that of Anne Brontë, who died in Scarborough in 1849. Anne's sister Charlotte commissioned a stone to be placed over her grave, with the simple inscription "Here lie the remains of Anne Brontë, daughter of the Revd P. Brontë, Incumbent of Haworth, Yorkshire. She died Aged 28 May 28th 1849". When Charlotte visited the grave three years later, she discovered multiple errors on the headstone, and thus it was refaced. However, Anne's age at death was still written as 28 when, in fact, she was 29 when she died. In 2011, the correction was finally made when a new inscribed plinth was laid by the Brontë Society in front of the eroded headstone.

St Mary's Church, and, to the right, the ruins of its former apse

West facade

South portal

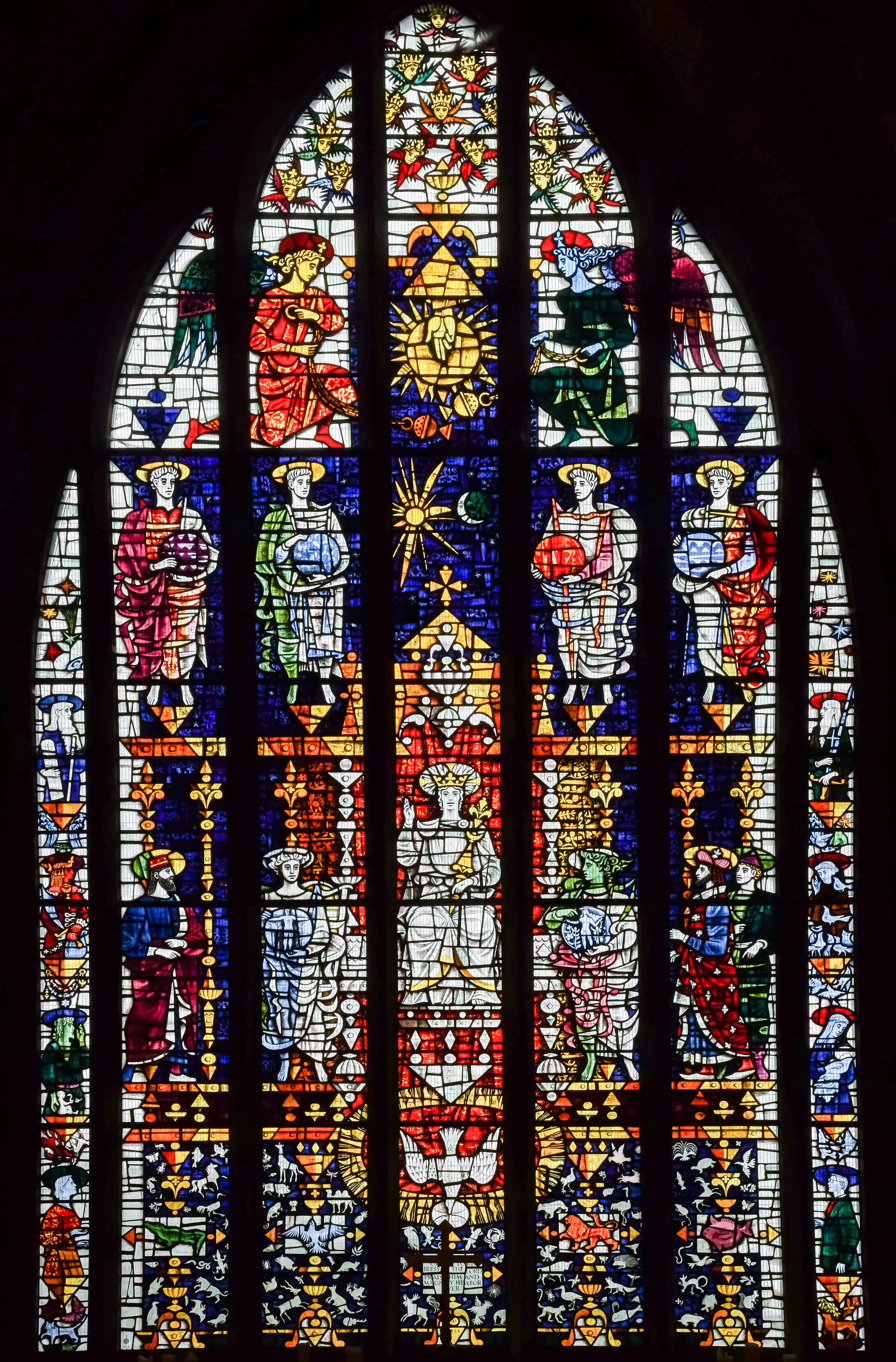
East window by Harry Stammers (1958)

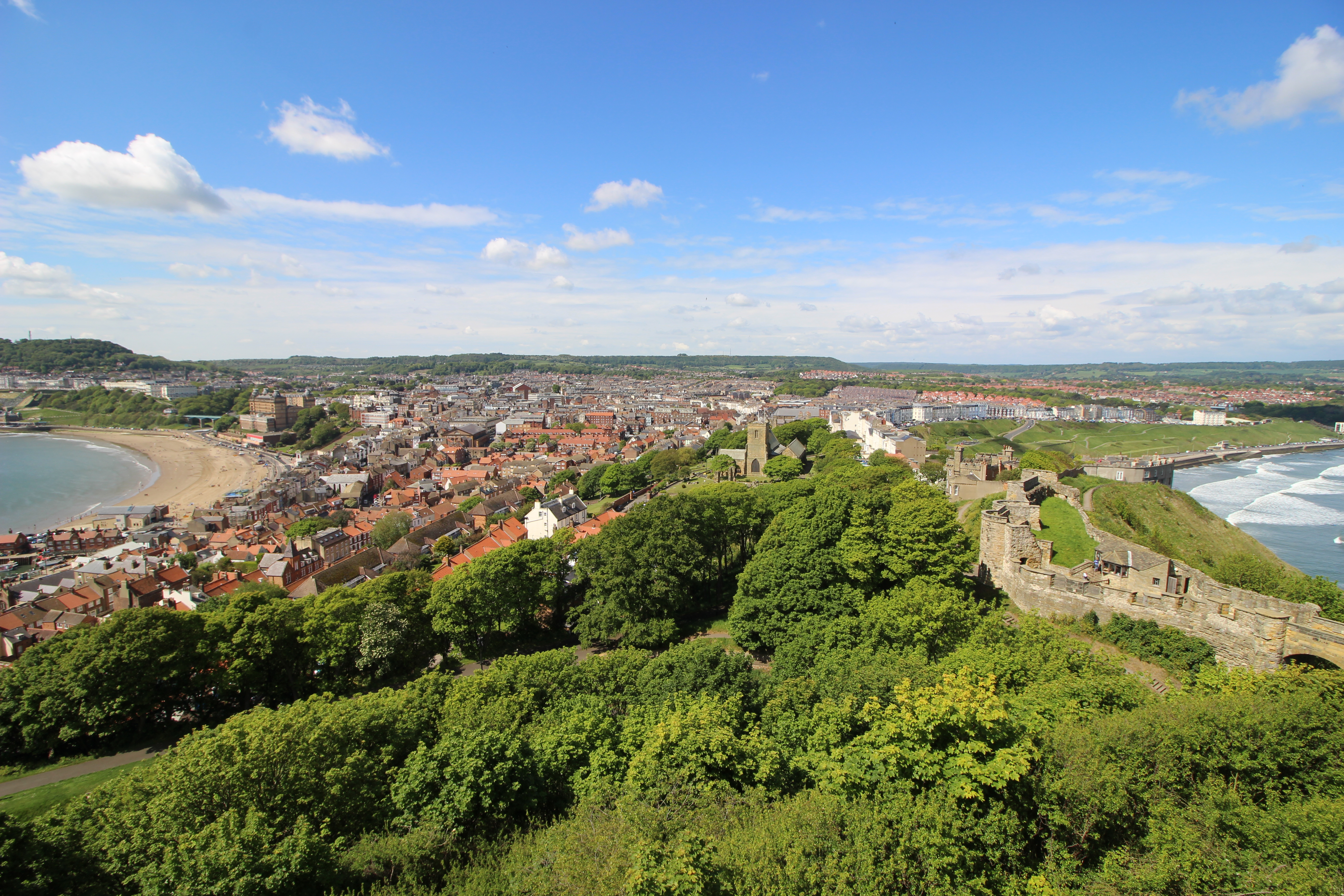
The church as seen from Scarborough Castle

== See also ==
- Grade I listed buildings in North Yorkshire (district)
- Listed buildings in Scarborough (Castle Ward)
