= William Booker =

William Booker may refer to:

- William Lane Booker (1824–1905), British diplomat
- William Booker (architect) (1800–1861), English architect
- William Henry Booker (1826–1896), English architect
- William John Henry Booker (1882–1921), African-American physician
