= T. Dan Smith =

British politician

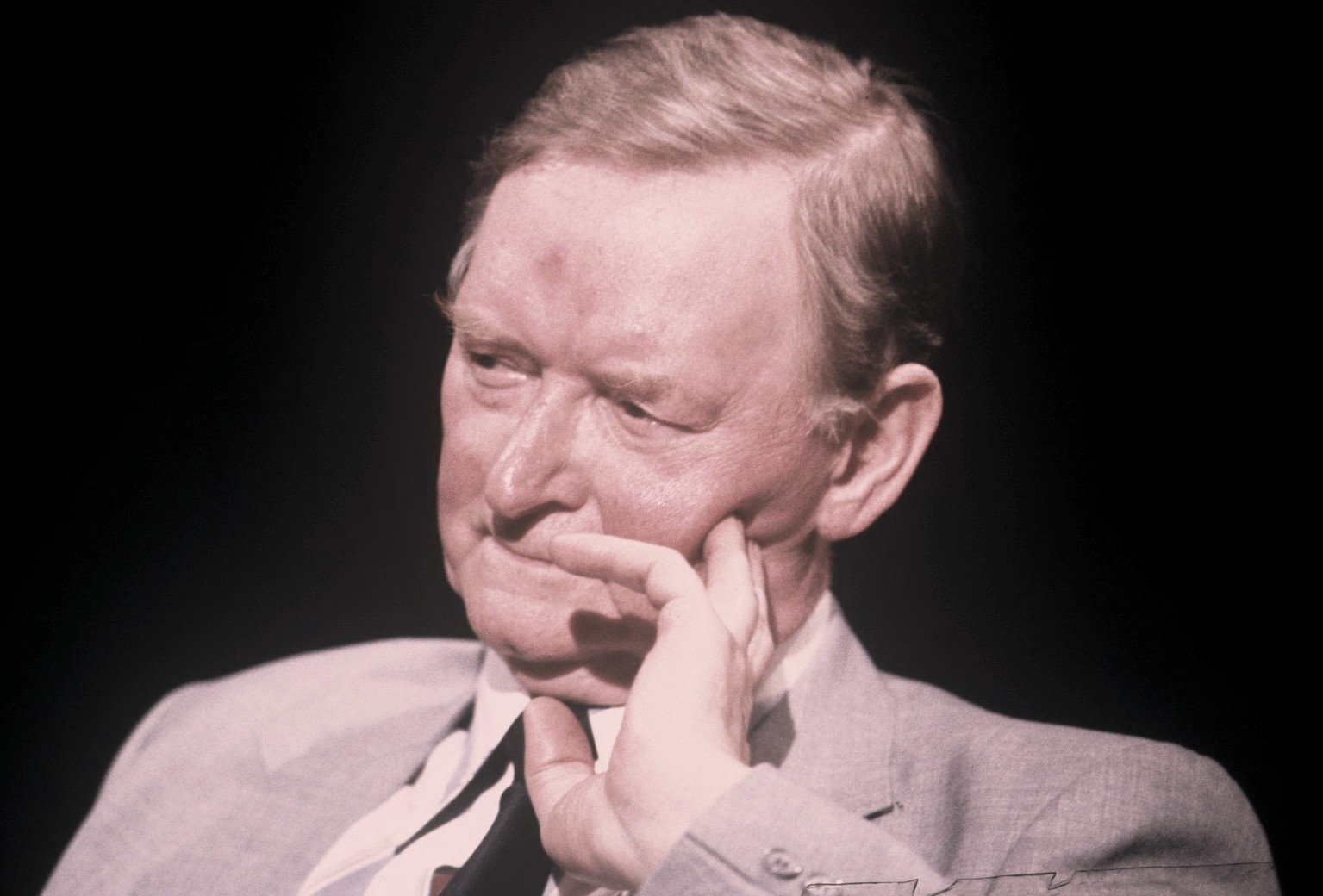
- Smith on After Dark in 1988

Leader of Newcastle City Council
- In office 1959–1965
- Preceded by: Position established
- Succeeded by: Frank Butterfield

Chairman of Newcastle Labour Party
- In office 1953–1965

Newcastle City Councillor for Walker
- In office 1950–1959

Personal details
- Born: Thomas Daniel Smith; 11 May 1915 Wallsend, Northumberland, England
- Died: 27 July 1993 (aged 78) Newcastle upon Tyne, England
- Party: Labour
- Occupation: Politician
- Nickname(s): Mr Newcastle; Mouth of the Tyne

Thomas Daniel Smith (11 May 1915 – 27 July 1993), also known by his nickname “Mr Newcastle”, was a British Labour Party politician who served as chairman of the Newcastle Labour Party from 1953 to 1965, and as Leader of Newcastle City Council from 1960 to 1965. He is best known for his work to clear Newcastle of slum housing and his plans to transform the city into "The Brasília of the North". He supported the expansion of higher education, Newcastle Airport, and local arts institutions. In 1974, Smith pleaded guilty to corruption charges.

Among the developments in which Smith's council participated were the Newcastle Civic Centre and Swan House. The latter led to the demolition of John Dobson's Royal Arcade, though Smith's council had it carefully dismantled and planned to rebuild it nearby. The succeeding council decided not to rebuild it. Smith's legacy became associated with the destruction of historic buildings in favour of unpopular concrete structures, despite the key developments happening mainly under other council leaders.

After leaving the council leadership, Smith ran a public relations firm and formed business links with architect John Poulson. In Smith's later life he campaigned for prisoners' issues and continued to comment on public affairs. He starred in a film of his life released in 1987.

== Early life ==
Smith was born in Wallsend, the son of a Durham miner. His father drank heavily and was a gambler. His mother worked long hours cleaning the Wallsend telephone exchange and washing floors at the Shell-Mex office.

He attended Western Boys School in Wallsend and became a printer's apprentice at the age of 14. After a period of unemployment, he founded his own painting and decorating business in 1937. During the economically difficult years of the 1930s, he expanded his business, painting cinema exteriors across Tyneside.

Both his parents were communists and Smith adopted left-wing opinions himself. During World War II, Smith registered as a conscientious objector and was initially active in opposing the war and organising strikes against it, but he supported the war after the German invasion of the Soviet Union on 22 June 1941. During the war, Smith joined several left-wing organisations. He was a regional representative for the Independent Labour Party in 1943, but later joined the Revolutionary Communist Party and led a shipyard strike.

By 1945, he was a member of the Labour Party and, in 1950, he was elected to Newcastle City Council as a Labour member, representing the Walker ward. He became chairman of the Labour Group in 1953.

It was around that time that he began using his first initial in his name, following an incident at Newcastle Airport when he was confused with another person called Dan Smith.

== Council leadership ==
When the Labour Party won the 1958 local elections and took control of Newcastle, Smith was appointed Chairman of the Housing Committee. He was elected as Leader of the City Council in 1959, and created one of the country's first free-standing Planning Departments and made it the most powerful department in the council. As Leader he instituted a personality-based leadership, creating an 'inner Cabinet' of his own supporters. So influential did Smith become that Lord Hailsham was sent up to Newcastle by the Conservative cabinet to try to counter him.

Smith was enthusiastic about town planning and the arts as means of improving the quality of life. He believed strongly in improving Newcastle's housing stock and put a great deal of effort into regeneration plans developed by his chief planning officer Wilfred Burns, suggesting that the city be nicknamed "The Brasília of the North". Smith's council also began the planning for Eldon Square Shopping Centre, which would be completed in 1977, on plans drawn up in 1972, by Taylor Chapman and Partners. Other projects he supported included the expansion of Newcastle International Airport, which was completed in 1967.

Redevelopment was concentrated in the eastern part of the city centre, which had until then been occupied by 18th and 19th century housing. The streetscape design favoured a strong segregation between traffic and pedestrians. The plans also favoured the preservation of the historic core around Grey Street. Though it continued under subsequent councils, the development was left substantially incomplete.

Smith continued to run his painting business, which employed 250 by 1965. In 1962, he established a public relations firm to support redevelopment of other urban centres in the north-east, and later nationwide. This company formed links with John Poulson, an architect keen for the business and known for paying those who could supply it.

Smith eventually received £156,000 from Poulson for his work, which typically involved signing up local councillors on to the payroll of his companies and getting them to push their councils to accept Poulson's prepackaged redevelopment schemes. Poulson earned more than £1,000,000 through Smith, who regarded him as the "best architect Britain ever produced."

Poulson did not design any buildings in Newcastle, and there is no evidence of corruption during Smith's time as head of Newcastle's council.

He attracted criticism from fellow Labour Party members for his extravagant spending, driving a Jaguar with the private plate "DAN 68", educating his children privately and purchasing a pied-à-terre in St James's, London. Smith was a political contemporary and ally of North East Labour stalwart Andy Cunningham, who was also brought down by the Poulson scandal and served a jail sentence.

== Political advancement ==
On the day after the 1964 general election, Smith waited for what he thought would be a certain phone call to invite him to become a cabinet minister in Harold Wilson's government. However, Wilson had a vague suspicion of Smith, and Smith's alliance with the more moderate side of the Labour Party meant that no such invitation was made. In early 1965, George Brown appointed Smith as chairman of the Northern Economic Planning Council, an advisory body. He resigned his council leadership to take this post, and served in it until 1970.

Smith was also to serve on the Buchanan Committee on traffic management and the Redcliffe-Maud Commission on local government. On the latter he promoted a scheme whereby England would be divided into five provinces with wide devolution, making Manchester the capital of the North province with 17,000,000 people.

He was a member of the Royal commission on Local Government in England from 1966 to 1969 and was chairman of the Peterlee and Aycliffe Development Corporation from 1968 to 1970.

== Corruption trials ==
Smith's PR firm was involved with Wandsworth Borough Council in pushing a redevelopment scheme, where its contact was Alderman Sidney Sporle. Sporle fell under police suspicion of corruption in the late 1960s and an inquiry led to Smith being charged with bribery in January 1970. Although acquitted at trial in July 1971, Smith was forced to resign all his political offices.

In 1972 John Poulson went bankrupt. The subsequent examination of his books disclosed a web of unexplained payments and led to a series of hearings out of which the Conservative MP Reginald Maudling, former chairman of two of Poulson's companies, was forced to resign as Home Secretary. A nationwide scandal erupted with conflict of interest accusations applying to councillors nationwide, but particularly in North East local authorities.

Out of these investigations Smith was arrested in October 1973 on corruption charges. At his trial, it was claimed that he had received £156,000 over seven years, usually in the form of payment to his public relations company. He pleaded guilty in 1974 and was sentenced to six years' imprisonment; despite his plea he continued to assert his innocence.

== After prison ==
While in prison, Smith became involved in amateur dramatics, where he met and encouraged Leslie Grantham to pursue his career as a professional. Following his release, Grantham was to later star in the BBC soap opera EastEnders. On release from Leyhill Open Prison in 1977 Smith attempted to rebuild a political career, but was initially refused re-admission to the Labour Party. He worked for the Howard League for Penal Reform and campaigned for the rights of released prisoners, and occasionally commented on municipal housing issues.

In 1987, he was readmitted into the Labour Party.

By 1990 he was a member of the executive committee of the Newcastle Tenants Association, and living on the 14th floor of Mill House, a tower block in the Spital Tongues area of the City.

Smith died of a suspected heart attack on 27 July 1993, in the Freeman Hospital, Heaton, Newcastle upon Tyne. He had undergone surgery after collapsing at home.

== Personal life ==
Smith was married to Ada (1919–2018) from 1939 until his death. He was the father of three children, a son, Cliff, and two daughters Jocelyn and Jill.

== Legacy ==
Smith was remembered for the personality and charisma he showed during his political career. He has been praised for championing North East England at a time when the region was in decline. Among his well-regarded achievements are slum clearance, helping establish an independent Newcastle University and modernising the local administration. Conversely, few defend his ethical conduct in the corruption case, although biographer Chris Foote Wood argues that Smith was treated unfairly and that the scandal was mainly the fault of Poulson.

Jeremy Beecham, a later leader of Newcastle City Council, argued that the corruption scandal had overshadowed the positive aspects of Smith's legacy. He praised Smith's charisma, vision, role in creating Eldon Square Shopping Centre and reforms to the local government, though he believed Smith made mistakes with his conduct and the demolition of certain historic buildings. The loss of John Dobson's Royal Arcade in 1963-64 and Old Eldon Square became particularly symbolic, although the Smith council had planned to rebuild the former. Owen Hatherley writes that in addition to being overly car-centred, "The problem with the idea of the Brasília of the North is that Newcastle never found a northern Oscar Niemeyer." John Shipley, another council leader, said that "his plan to turn Newcastle into the Brasília of the North was way over the top. Newcastle has a long and proud history and we have to build on that – not just ignore it and look for the next big thing."

== In the media ==
Smith starred in a drama-documentary film, T. Dan Smith: A Funny Thing Happened on the Way to Utopia, about his life story and the regeneration of Newcastle. Produced by Amber Films, the production was based on Smith's autobiography. It had a cinema release in 1987, and was broadcast on Channel 4 the following year. In February 1988 Smith made an extended appearance on an episode of After Dark, a live British discussion television programme entitled Freemasonry: Beyond the Law?, along with David Napley and others.

Smith's career was the inspiration for Austin Donohue, a character in Peter Flannery's play Our Friends in the North. The part was first played by Jim Broadbent in the Royal Shakespeare Company production in 1982, and then by Alun Armstrong in the 1996 BBC television drama version.

In his final years, Smith was a pundit on North East matters. He took part in a Radio Newcastle phone-in just nine days before his death.

In 2010 he was the subject of a biography by North East Liberal politician and writer Chris Foote Wood, T Dan Smith "Voice of the North" Downfall of a Visionary: The Life of the North-East's Most Charismatic Champion.

T. Dan Smith was referenced by Michael Whitehall in an episode of the online series Tales with my Father, co-presented with his son, comedian Jack Whitehall. Whitehall had initially confused Smith with Scientology founder L. Ron Hubbard.

== Bibliography ==
- Pendlebury, John (2001). "Alas Smith and Burns? Conservation in Newcastle upon Tyne city centre 1959–68". Planning Perspectives. 16 (16): 115–141. Bibcode:2001PlPer..16..115P. doi:10.1080/02665430010018239. S2CID 144072456.

Party political offices
Preceded by Norman Winters	North East Division representative on the Independent Labour Party National Administrative Council; 1943–1945	Succeeded by Norman Winters
