= Albion United Reformed Church =

Albion United Reformed Church or Albion Congregational Church may refer to:

- Albion United Reformed Church, Ashton-under-Lyne
- Albion United Reformed Church, Nottingham
