= YMCA Building, Newcastle upon Tyne =

YMCA Building
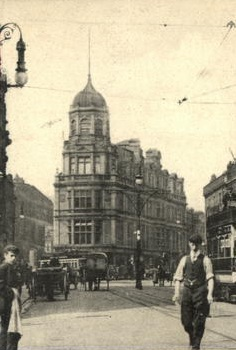
- YMCA Building

- Shown in Tyne and Wear
- 54.9739°N 1.6140°W
- Location: Newcastle upon Tyne

History
- Built: 1900
- Demolished: 1969

Site notes
- Architect: John William Taylor
- Architectural style: Neoclassical style

The YMCA Building was a prominent building on Blackett Street in central Newcastle upon Tyne, England. Completed in May 1900, it was demolished to facilitate the construction of the Eldon Square Shopping Centre in the early 1970s.

== History ==
The YMCA first established a presence in Newcastle upon Tyne in Grainger Street in 1849. In the early 1880s, they decided to acquire a larger property on Blackett Street. The site they selected there had originally been occupied by the old Fickett Tower, which had formed part of the old town wall. The tower had been demolished to make way for the St. James Chapel, which was designed by John Dobson in the neoclassical style, built in ashlar stone and completed in 1826. It featured a fine tetrastyle portico formed by Doric order columns supporting an entablature with triglyphs and a pediment. After the parishioners moved to a new church in Bath Road (now Northumberland Road), the chapel had become vacant and the property was acquired by the YMCA in 1884.

In the late 19th century, after finding the chapel inadequate for their purposes, the YMCA decided to demolish the chapel and to erect a new building on the site. The foundation stones for the new building were laid by Emma Sophia Georgiana, Countess of Ravensworth, the politician, Emerson Bainbridge, and others in 1896. It was designed by John William Taylor in the neoclassical style, built in ashlar stone and was officially opened by Prince Arthur, Duke of Connaught and Strathearn and his wife, Princess Louise, on 9 May 1900.

The design involved a distinctive five-stage tower on the corner of Grainger Street and Blackett Street. There were retail units on the ground floor, bay windows on the first, second and third floors and a octagonal stage with an ogee-shaped dome and a finial at roof level. Internally, the principal rooms included a large dining room and an assembly room, used for lectures and other events, known as the "Connaught Hall". A plaque intended to commemorate to lives of local members of the YMCA who had died in the First World War, was unveiled in the building by the Lord Lieutenant of Northumberland, Alan Percy, 8th Duke of Northumberland, on 9 May 1925.

After the YMCA relocated to new premises on Welbeck Road, the Blackett Street building was demolished in 1969 to permit the development of the Eldon Square Shopping Centre.
