= Nunnykirk Hall =

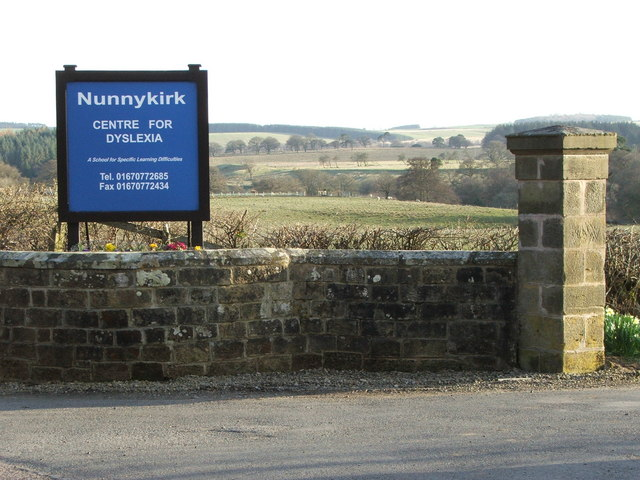
- Sign outside the hall

- Location in Northumberland

General information
- Location: Northumberland, England, UK
- Coordinates: 55.228°N 1.872°W
- OS grid: NZ082926

Nunnykirk Hall is a 19th-century country house and Grade I listed building in the civil parish of Nunnykirk, near the village of Netherwitton in the English county of Northumberland.

== History ==
In 1536 the Nunnykirk estate, including a tower, was owned by the abbots of Newminster Abbey but fell to the Crown on the Dissolution of the Monasteries. In 1610 it was granted by the Crown to Sir Ralph Grey. Grey later sold it to the Ward family of Morpeth who built a manor house.

In 1771 Ann Ward, the heiress of the Nunnykirk estate married William Orde, (the half brother of Admiral Sir John Orde). Their son William Orde, Jr. (1774–1843) rebuilt the house in a grand style designed by architect John Dobson in 1825.

William Orde, Jr. established a racing stud at Nunnykirk and both he and his nephew and heir Charles William Orde (1810–1875) enjoyed considerable success as breeders. Their most successful horses were Beeswing, Nunnykirk (winner of the 2,000 Guineas), and Newminster (winner of the St. Leger 1851).

Since 1977, the house was occupied by a special needs school, known as Nunnykirk Centre for Dyslexia. The School closed in July 2022.
