= Andrew Cunningham (politician) =

- Born: 8 June 1910; Durham, England
- Died: 14 June 2010 (aged 100)
- Occupation: Politician
- Political party: Labour Party
- Criminal charge: Corruption
- Criminal penalty: 3 years imprisonment

Andrew Cunningham (8 June 1910 – 14 June 2010) was a political figure and union leader in North East England. Born in Durham, he was jailed for his role in the Poulson scandal of 1974. He lived most of his life in Chester-le-Street.

At the height of his career in 1971 he held the following positions:

- Member of the National Executive Committee (NEC) of the Labour Party
- Chairman of the Chester-le-Street and the Northern Region Executive of the Labour Party
- Head of the Northern District of the National Union of General and Municipal Workers (NUGMW) (the biggest union in the north-east, succeeding John Yarwood MBE)
- Alderman of Durham County Council
- Member of the Chester-le-Street town council
- Chairman of Durham Police Authority
- Chairman of Newcastle Airport Consultative Committee
- Member of the Northumbrian River Authority
- Member of the Peterlee New Town Development Corporation
- Member of the Tyneside Passenger Transport Authority

His role with the GMWU in particular gave him considerable influence, via the Trade Union block vote, in the selection of Labour Party parliamentary candidates. The Poulson scandal also destroyed the careers of T. Dan Smith and the Conservative Home Secretary, Reginald Maudling. Cunningham was sentenced to five years imprisonment, reduced to three on appeal. He was paroled from Ford Open Prison in June 1976.

He was the father of Labour politician Jack Cunningham and two other children.
