= Beeswing (horse) =

British-bred Thoroughbred racehorse

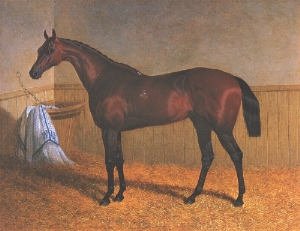
- Beeswing
- Sire: Doctor Syntax
- Grandsire: Paynator
- Dam: Ardrossan mare (1817)
- Damsire: Ardrossan
- Sex: Mare
- Foaled: 1833
- Country: Great Britain
- Colour: Bay
- Breeder: Nunnykirk Hall Stud
- Owner: William Orde, Jr.
- Trainer: James Watson; Robert "Bob" Johnson
- Record: 63: 51–8–1

Major wins
- Champagne Stakes (1835); Newcastle St. Leger (1836); Newcastle Gold Cup (1836, 1837, 1838, 1839, 1841, 1842); Doncaster Cup (1837, 1840, 1841, 1842); Cleveland Stakes (1837); Gold Shield (1837); Northallerton Gold Cup (1837, 1838); Craven Stakes (1838, 1839, 1840); Queen's Plate (1838, 1839); Fitzwilliam Stakes (1838, 1839, 1840); Queen's Purse (1839); Stockton Cup (1839, 1841); Ashton Stakes (1840); Lancaster Cup (1840); Hornsby Castle Stakes (1841); Ascot Gold Cup (1842)

Honours
- Beeswing Stakes at Newcastle Racecourse; Beeswing Ladies Day at Newcastle Racecourse; Village named in Beeswing's honor
- Last updated on 15 May 2009

Beeswing (1833–1854) was a 19th-century British Thoroughbred racehorse from the north of England. In her day, Beeswing was hailed as the greatest mare in Britain and one of the greatest of all time.

== Breeding ==
Her sire, Doctor Syntax was described by the noted racing writer "The Druid" as "...scarcely fifteen hands, very broad at the base of the nose, with open nostrils, an eye full and bright as a hawk's, a high, drooping rump, and on the side view rather short quartered. He was quite a mouse in his colour." But he took the Preston Gold Cup seven times, the Richmond Gold Cup five times, and the Lancaster Gold Cup five times as well. On both her dam's and her sire's side, Beeswing was descended from two renowned stallions, Eclipse (5x5x5) and Herod (5x5).

== Racing career ==
Beeswing raced at many venues between 1835 and 1842 and was a real crowd favourite. Entering 63 events, she won an astonishing 51 times. Of the 57 races she finished, she was placed lower than second only once. Her most notable victory was in the Ascot Gold Cup of 1842. She won the Newcastle Cup no fewer than six times and was retired after winning the Doncaster Cup for the fourth time.

James Hill of Tyneside composed a hornpipe, "The Beeswing," named after her. Such was her fame that the Scottish village of Lochend in Dumfries and Galloway changed its name to Beeswing in her honour.

There is a pub in York named after the mare. The Beeswing stands on Hull Road and displays an image of the horse on its sign.

== Stud record ==
Of her eight foals, five were sired by Touchstone. Four of her foals went on to become top class runners, two of which were Classic winners. Many of today's top racehorses can trace their pedigree back to Beeswing. Some of her top runners were:

- Nunnykirk (b. 1846) - won the 2,000 Guineas, ran 2nd in the St. Leger Stakes
- Newminster (b. 1848) - won the St. Leger Stakes, Leading sire in Great Britain & Ireland in 1859 and 1863
- Honeysuckle (blk. 1851) - won the Park Hill Stakes, 3rd in 1000 Guineas. Influential broodmare, being the female-line ancestor of Melton, Ayrshire, Damascus, Storm Cat, Sir Ivor, Bold Ruler, Golden Fleece, Assert, Ruffian and John Henry.

== Pedigree ==
Pedigree of Beeswing (GB), bay mare, 1833
Sire Doctor Syntax (GB) 1811	Paynator; 1791	Trumpator	Conductor
Sire Doctor Syntax (GB) 1811	Paynator; 1791	Trumpator	Brunette
Sire Doctor Syntax (GB) 1811	Paynator; 1791	Mark Anthony mare	Mark Anthony
Sire Doctor Syntax (GB) 1811	Paynator; 1791	Mark Anthony mare	Signora
Sire Doctor Syntax (GB) 1811	Beningbrough mare	Beningbrough	King Fergus
Sire Doctor Syntax (GB) 1811	Beningbrough mare	Beningbrough	Fenwick's Herod mare
Sire Doctor Syntax (GB) 1811	Beningbrough mare	Jenny Mole	Carbuncle
Sire Doctor Syntax (GB) 1811	Beningbrough mare	Jenny Mole	Prince Tquassaw mare
Dam Ardrossan mare (GB) 1817	Ardrossan; 1809	John Bull	Fortitude
Dam Ardrossan mare (GB) 1817	Ardrossan; 1809	John Bull	Xantippe
Dam Ardrossan mare (GB) 1817	Ardrossan; 1809	Miss Whip	Volunteer
Dam Ardrossan mare (GB) 1817	Ardrossan; 1809	Miss Whip	Wimbleton
Dam Ardrossan mare (GB) 1817	Lady Eliza; 1813	Whitworth	Agonistes
Dam Ardrossan mare (GB) 1817	Lady Eliza; 1813	Whitworth	Jupiter mare
Dam Ardrossan mare (GB) 1817	Lady Eliza; 1813	Spadille mare	Spadille
Dam Ardrossan mare (GB) 1817	Lady Eliza; 1813	Spadille mare	Sylvia (Family 8)

== See also ==
- Repeat winners of horse races
