= Newton on the Moor =

Village in Northumberland, England

Coordinates: 55.343°N 1.741°W

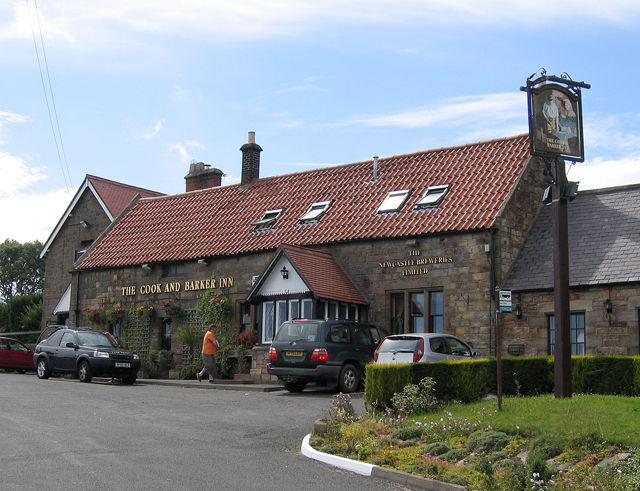
- The Cook and Barker public house

- Location within Northumberland
- Population: 905 (2011)
- OS grid reference: NU165055
- Civil parish: Newton-on-the-Moor and Swarland
- Unitary authority: Northumberland
- Ceremonial county: Northumberland
- Region: North East
- Country: England
- Sovereign state: United Kingdom
- Post town: MORPETH
- Postcode district: NE65
- Dialling code: 01665
- Police: Northumbria
- Fire: Northumberland
- Ambulance: North East
- UK Parliament: North Northumberland

Newton on the Moor is a village and former civil parish in Northumberland, England. It is located 5 miles (8 km) south of Alnwick, on the old route of the A1 road although the village has now been bypassed just to the east. The village is now in the civil parish of Newton on the Moor and Swarland, which also includes the village of Swarland, south-west of Newton on the Moor. The population of Newton on the Moor and Swarland parish in 2001 was 822, increasing to 905 at the 2011 Census. The village is a conservation area.

A settlement existed at Newton on the Moor in the late 13th century.

Newton Hall is a grade II listed building built for Samuel Cook on the site of an earlier house in 1772.

== Governance ==
Newton-on-the-Moor was formerly a township in Shilbottle parish, in 1866 Newton on the Moor became a civil parish in its own right, on 1 April 1955 Greens and Glantlees, Hazon and Hartlaw and Swarland parishes were merged with Newton on the Moor, on 15 December 1987 the parish was renamed "Newton on the Moor and Swarland". In 1951 the parish (prior to the merge) had a population of 140.

== George Handyside ==
George Handyside (1821–1904) was a business magnate born in Newton.
