= Newton Hall, Newton on the Moor =

Country house in Newton on the Moor, Northumberland, England

Coordinates: 55°20′11″N 1°44′10″W

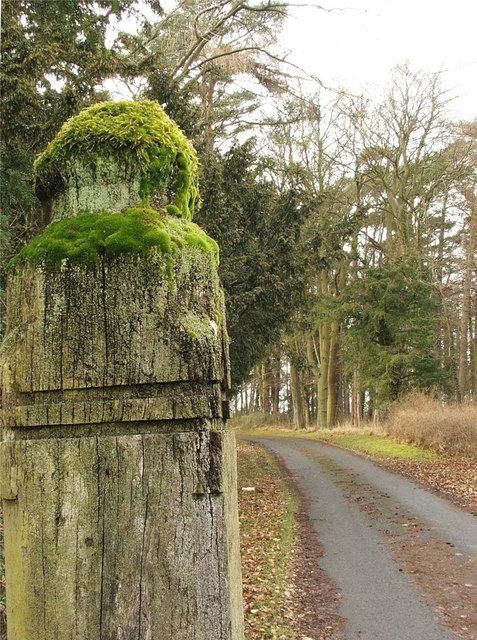
Entrance to Newton Hall

Newton Hall is an 18th-century country house at Newton on the Moor, near Alnwick, Northumberland, England. It is a Grade II listed building.

== History ==
The house was built for Samuel Cook on the site of an earlier house in 1772, possibly by Newcastle architect William Newton. His grandson Samuel Edward Cook inherited the estate and also the Hauxley estate of his maternal grandmother Frances Widdrington. In 1840 he changed his name to Widdrington. He served as High Sheriff of Northumberland in 1854.

His nephew and heir Shalcross Fitzherbert Jacson (who changed his name to Widdrington in 1856) significantly remodelled and enlarged the house in 1864. He was High Sheriff in 1874.

The Widdrington estates were broken up in the 20th century. Hauxley was sold in 1956 and Newton by auction in 1957. The house contents were auctioned by Christie's in London on 20 January 2010.

The late 18th century stable block (also a Grade II listed building) bears a gateway clock made in 1763 for Princess Amelia a daughter of George II of Great Britain.
