= Eldon Square Shopping Centre =

Shopping centre in Newcastle, England

Eldon Square
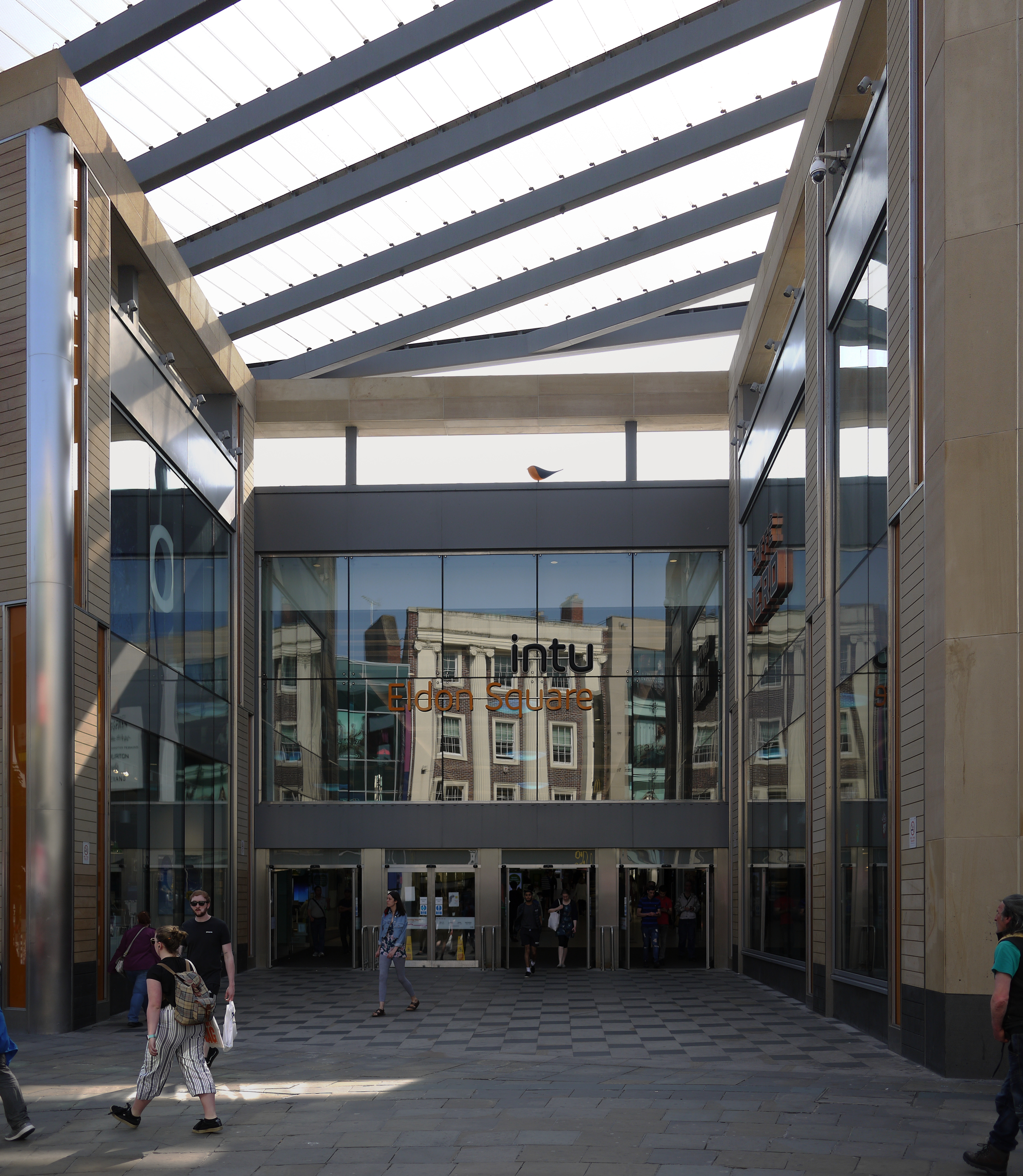
- Eldon Square's main entrance on Northumberland Street
- Location: Newcastle upon Tyne, England
- Coordinates: 54.9752°N 1.6151°W
- Opened: 4 March 1976
- Previous names: intu Eldon Square (2013–2020)
- Owner: XPE Group plc (60%); Newcastle City Council (40%)
- Num. of stores: 140
- Num. of anchor tenants: 4 (Fenwick, John Lewis, Next and Marks and Spencer)
- Floor area: 130,100 square metres (1,400,000 sq ft)
- Floors: 2
- Parking: 497 spaces: Eldon Square; 445 spaces: Eldon Garden
- Public transit: Eldon Square bus station; Haymarket bus station; Haymarket Metro station; Monument Metro station
- Website: eldonsquare.co.uk

Eldon Square (stylised as ELDON SQ.) is a shopping centre in Newcastle upon Tyne, England. It opened in 1976 on the site of Old Eldon Square, a famous part of Georgian Newcastle designed by John Dobson in 1824. The centre was initially the largest indoor shopping centre in the United Kingdom.

The shopping centre spans an area that was historically significant, including the Nunn's Garden and various wards named after the town's defensive towers. The redevelopment in the mid-1970s, which left only the eastern terrace of Old Eldon Square standing, has been criticized for its architectural impact.

Eldon Square has undergone several redevelopments over the years, including the addition of new malls such as St Andrew's Way, and dining areas in Grey's Quarter. Notable stores within the centre include John Lewis, Next, and the flagship Fenwick department store. The centre was called Intu Eldon Square from 2013 until 2020.

== Site ==
The shopping centre occupies an area close to the old town wall, which followed the course of Blackett Street. This means the modern shopping centre is built on either side of where the wall once stood. From a map drawn by Charles Hutton in 1770, it appears that the ancient wall would have run parallel with the south side of Blackett street. This is the northernmost wall of the southern portion of the shopping centre. The YMCA Building, erected in the late 19th century, formed part of the former Blackett Street frontage.

As the city would have grown within its town walls, just south of the north wall was the Nunn's Garden. This is around the location of the now demolished Green Market. The Nunn's Garden was bordered by High Friar Chare, a street running almost in-line with 'High Friars way' in the present shopping centre. Wards in this area were named after the towers which guarded the ancient town walls. The wards occupying the south portion of the shopping centre would have been 'Andrew Tower ward' site of Newgate multi-storey car park (now demolished) and Eldon Leisure. 'Fickett Tower ward', is below where Eldon Leisure is located in the present megastructure, and 'Bertram Momboucher Tower ward' is located where the now demolished Eldon food courts and Newgate car park once stood.

North of the town walls, Charles Hutton's 1770 map shows a bowling green on the site of the present day Marks & Spencer, John Lewis part of the megastructure and Prudhoe Street car park. The area presently occupied by the Northumberland Street entrance to the centre and Fenwicks were in 1770 market vegetable gardens. That would have been south of the bowling green.

In 1824, John Dobson was commissioned by Richard Grainger to produce designs for Old Eldon Square. The design involved terraces facing a central square: the terraces were faced with finely cut ashlar.

== History ==
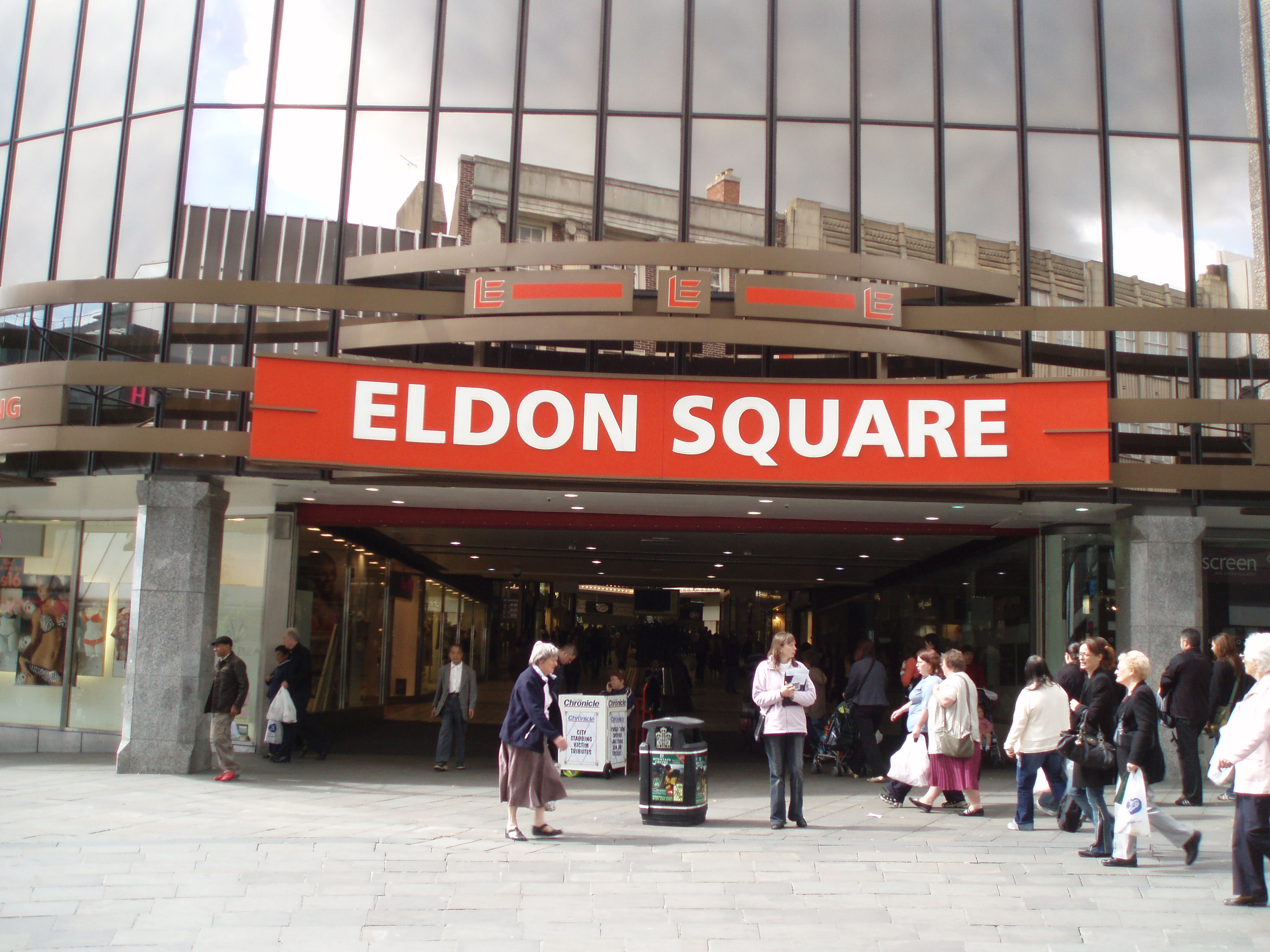
The previous Northumberland Street entrance to Eldon Square, now redeveloped.

During the 1960s, the leader of the city council, T. Dan Smith, set the groundwork for a new shopping centre. He intended to use the famous Danish architect Arne Jacobsen; however this fell through. Old Eldon Square was nonetheless controversially redeveloped in the mid 1970s, with Christopher Booker writing in 1978 that it was "perhaps the greatest single example of architectural vandalism in Britain since the war. Until ten years ago this most handsome piece of old Newcastle, with its blackened, post-classical frontages survived intact. Today only one side remains, the rest dominated by the astonishingly brutal shopping centre put up by Capital and Counties, turning its brick backside on the world in the most aggressive way, in order to lure Novocastrians into the softly-lit womb of the air-conditioned shopping malls within."

The first phase of Eldon Square shopping centre opened on 4 March 1976, with a second phase opening in September, and an official opening ceremony in 1977 carried out by Queen Elizabeth II during her Silver Jubilee. At the time, it was the largest indoor shopping centre in the country. Some of the shopping malls were named after elements of local culture; notably Chevy Chase was named after the medieval Northumbrian Ballad of Chevy Chase, and Douglas Way was named after the Scottish Earl of Douglas who takes a prominent role in the ballad. The Fenwick department store established an access from the centre into their store and Bainbridge's, part of the John Lewis Partnership, moved into the centre at the time.

The opening of the MetroCentre in nearby Gateshead during 1986 provided competition for Eldon Square. A three-storey extension to Eldon Square which included a food court was opened in October 1987.

The Green Market, which was situated in the southern part of the centre, closed in January 2007 for relocation and the site was demolished later in the year along with a car park as part of redevelopment works. The new Eldon Square bus station opened in March 2007, allowing the existing bus station to be converted into shops. The site of the former Green Market was used to make way for Eldon Square South, later known as St Andrew's Way, a new mall with a Debenhams department store as the anchor tenant.

The centre was rebranded as Intu Eldon Square in April 2013, following the renaming of Capital Shopping Centres Group as Intu Properties. Around the same time as the rebrand, the centre underwent an extensive refurbishment at a cost of £22 million. The upgrade works included new ceilings and a new entrance at Northumberland Street. The Eldon Leisure centre above the malls was refurbished in July 2015. The next phase of the redevelopment was the creation of a new dining quarter in the old Sidgate and High Friars malls called Grey's Quarter. Work commenced in summer 2015 with the first restaurant to open being George's Great British Kitchen in October 2016.

On 26 June 2020, the majority owner and manager of Eldon Square, Intu, went into administration. In October 2020, it was confirmed Intu Debenture (XPE Group) had acquired the centre with a 60% stake; the remaining 40% of it remained under the ownership of Newcastle City Council. Intu Debenture also confirmed MAPP would be appointed as the property management company.

Eldon Leisure Centre temporarily closed in March 2020 as a result of the first COVID-19 lockdown. In September 2020, Greenwich Leisure Ltd (GLL) more commonly known as 'Better' confirmed the centre would be one of the three centres in Newcastle to remain closed for the 'foreseeable future'.

In February 2022, Better reopened Eldon Soft Play within the leisure centre. In April 2022, a bowling offer returned to the centre under the brand of 'Gorilla Bar and Bowling'.

In December 2023, plans to redevelop Eldon Leisure Centre into a new leisure complex where unveiled. These plans were approved by Newcastle City Council in April 2024.

In February 2025, Newcastle City Council announced plans to redevelop the top floor and roof of the former Debenhams into Freight Island, a concept dinning and entertainment venue with an opening date set for Autumn 2025. Freight Island opened later than planned in June 2026.

== Eldon Garden Shopping Centre ==
In 1989, a new shopping centre, Eldon Garden, opened to the north of Eldon Square on the site of the former Handyside Arcade at a cost of £15m. Although separately owned and managed, there are 2 entrances (a corridor and an escalator) to Eldon Garden's main shopping arcade from Eldon Square.

Eldon Garden was envisioned as an upmarket shopping centre and promised to bring new national retailers into Newcastle. Unfortunately, despite bringing in anchor tenants including Debenhams and later The Pier, there wasn't enough footfall to make the centre sustainable. Many blame the poor design of the centre on its demise, including the external pedestrian entrance being located on the wrong side of the busy Percy St, and the centre itself lacking thoroughfare, as the centre only led between the adjacent car park, and the more established Eldon Square development. This issue was compounded when the ground floor was closed off and converted into a pub which could only be accessed from the street, as it made the flow between the centre and surrounding areas less intuitive for shoppers.

In 2018, Peer Group the owners of the centre warned the centre could be closed down due to occupancy rates of only 15% and they threatened to sue Newcastle City Council accusing them of making decisions which negatively impacted the centre.

In May 2018, The Garden Kitchen Cafe closed leaving a prominent central location within the centre empty and only 6 commercial tenants remaining.

In 2023, the Eldon Garden shopping centre was put up for sale priced at £4.95m. The sale was due to most of the internal retail units being left empty and the centre generating "essentially zero" net income for its London-based owners. Eldon Garden was acquired by M Core in April 2026.

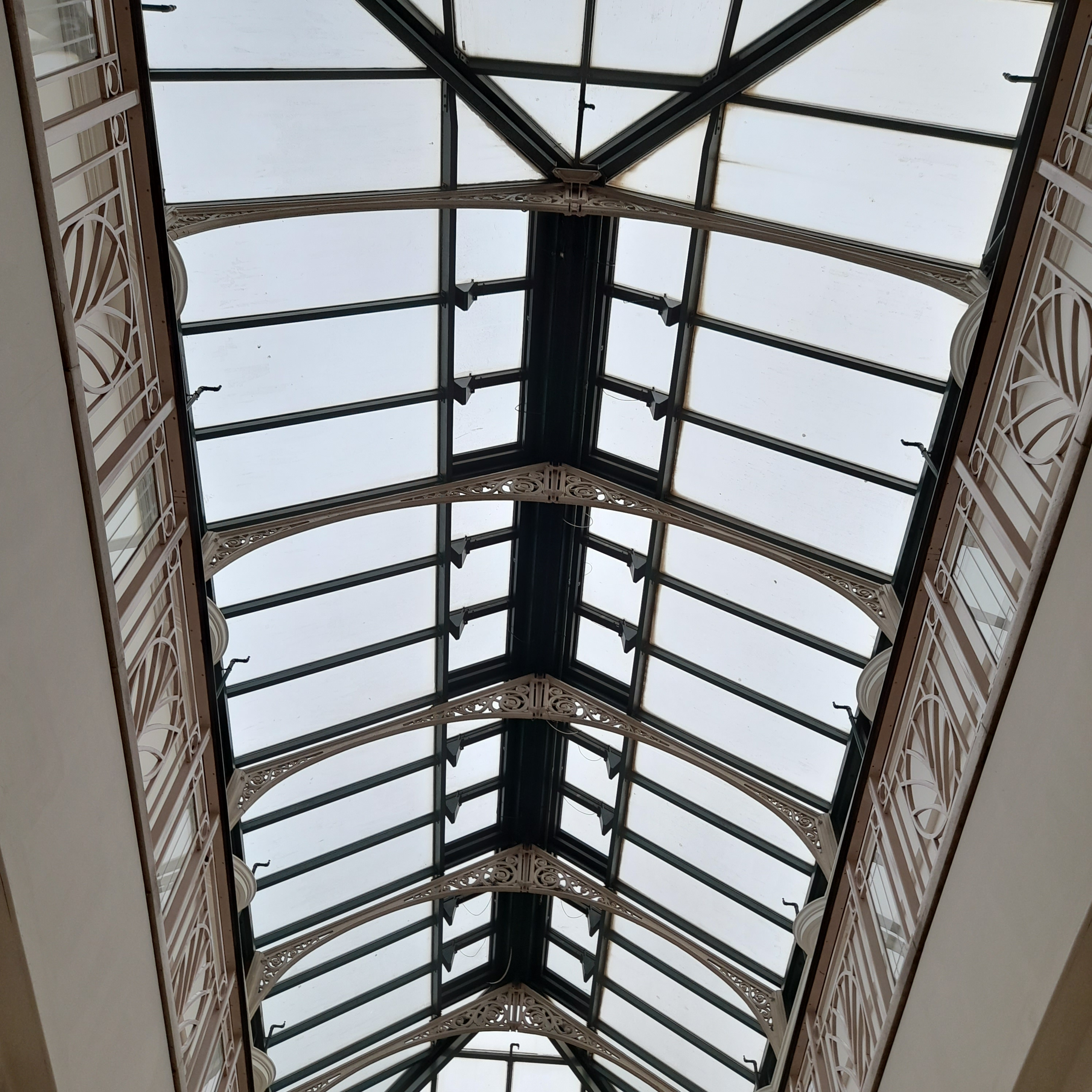
Reused cast iron Handyside Arcade's spans relocated in the Eldon Garden's roof

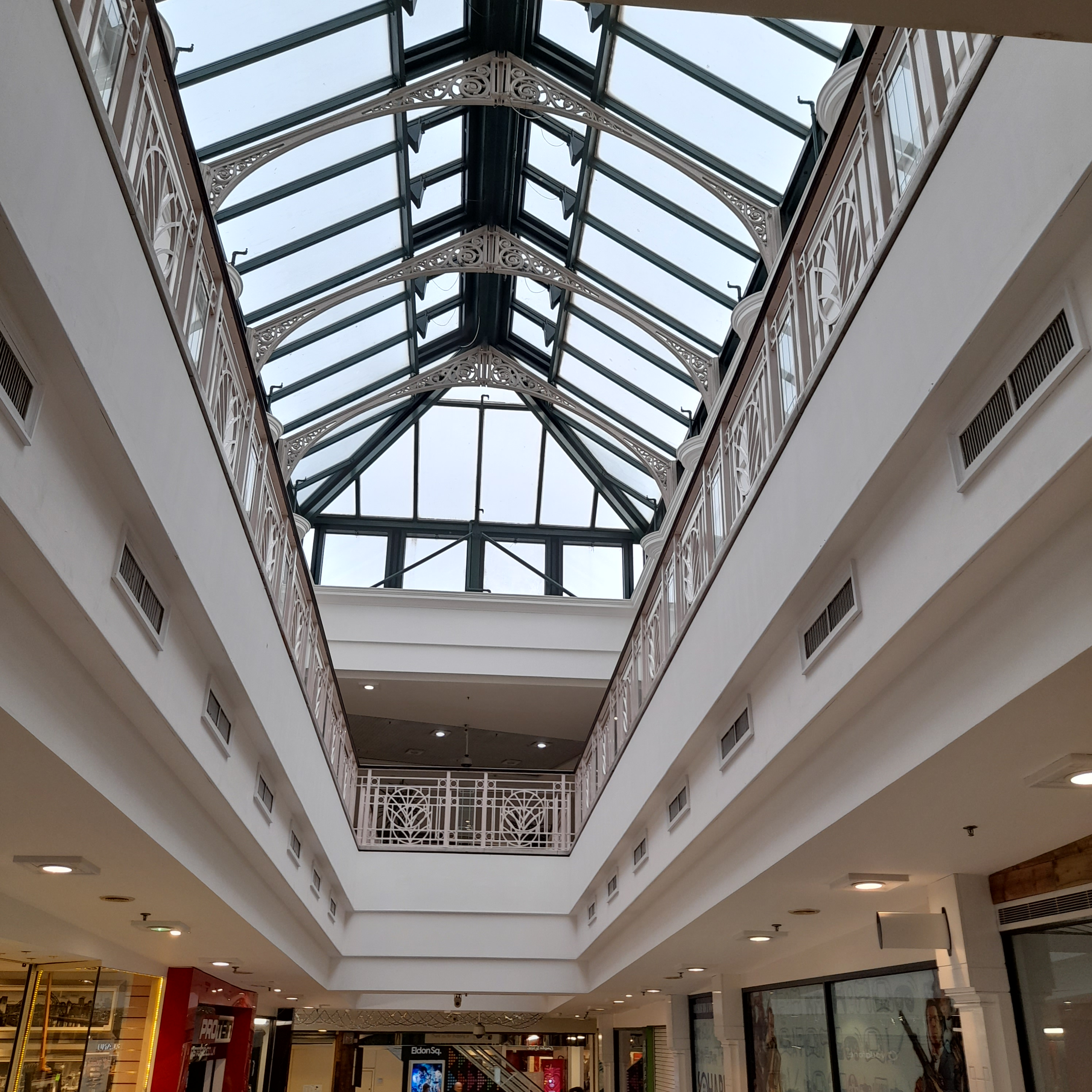
Reused roof trusses from the Handyside Arcade demolished to make way for the Eldon Garden redevelopment
