= William Booker (architect) =

English architect

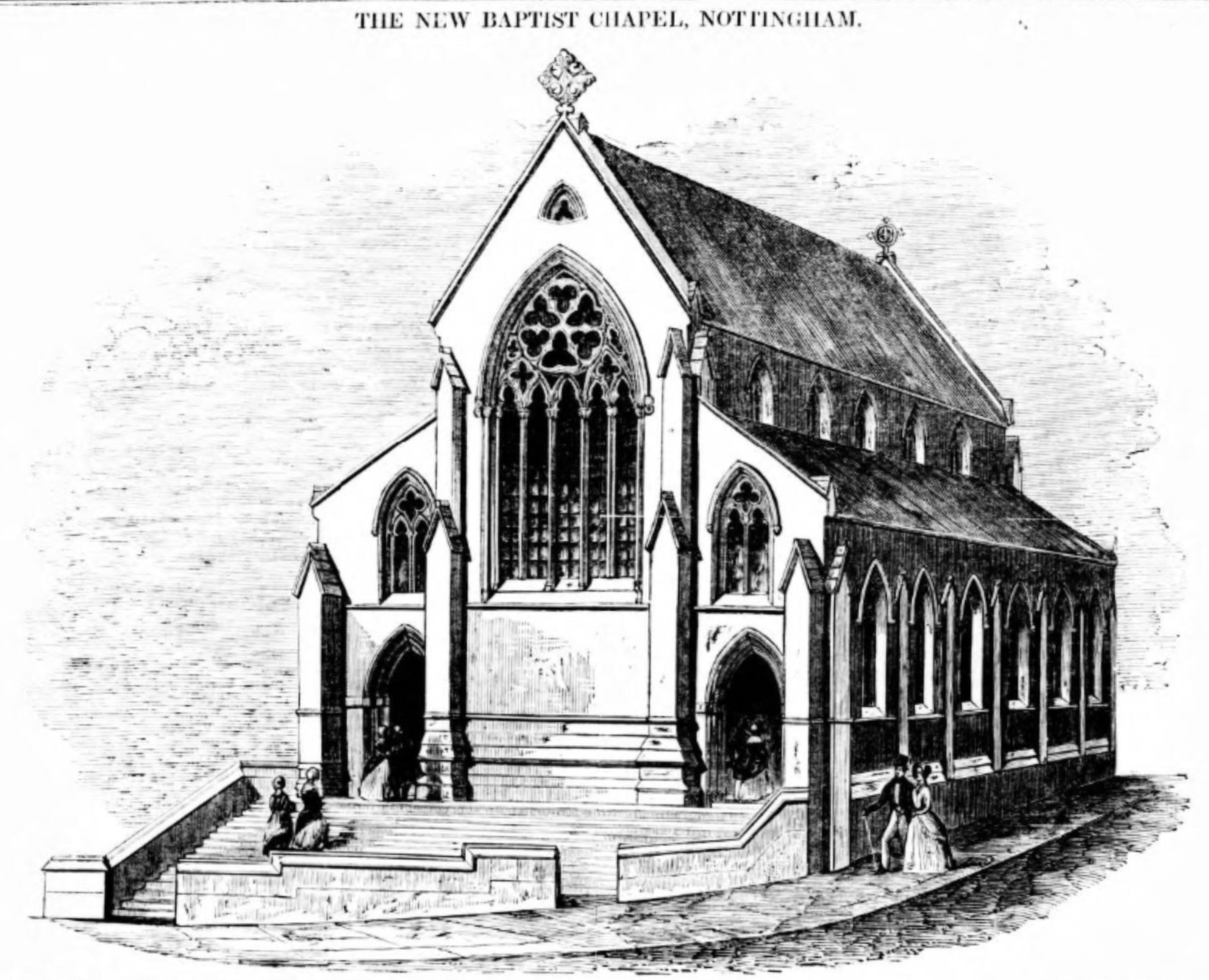
Derby Road Baptist Church, Nottingham 1850-51

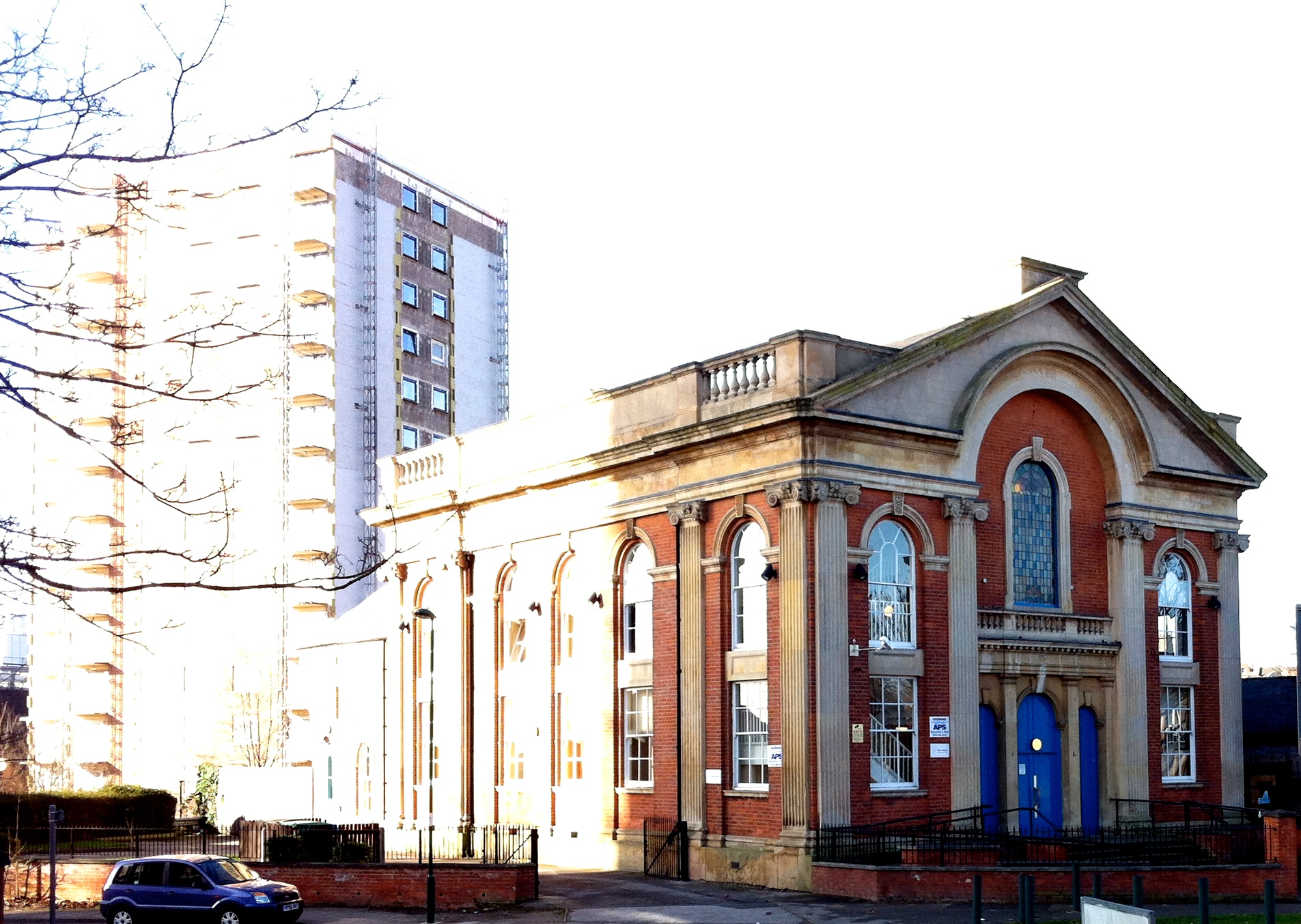
Albion Congregational Church, Nottingham 1855-56

William Booker (2 November 1800 – 20 December 1861) was an English architect based in Nottingham.

== Career ==
He was born on 2 November 1800 in Nottingham, the son of Richard Booker (1761–1833) and Hannah Davis (d. 1830) and baptised in St Mary's Church, Nottingham on 9 November 1800.

He married Eliza Foster (d. 1884), daughter of John Foster and Elizabeth of Nottingham. They had the following three children who entered into an architectural partnership in Nottingham.

- William Henry Booker (1826–1896)
- Frederick Richard Booker (1827–1882)
- Robert Booker

He learned his trade in the offices of Henry Moses Wood.

He was admitted to the freedom of the Borough of Nottingham in 1831. He was surveyor to the Freemen's Rights' Committee as the referee under the St. Mary's Nottingham Inclosure Act 1845 (8 & 9 Vict. c. 7 Pr.).

He died on 20 December 1861 at Cromwell Terrace, Nottingham and was buried in the Nottingham General Cemetery.

== Notable works ==
- General Baptist Chapel, Milton Street, Nottingham 1849–50 (now demolished)
- Derby Road Baptist Church, Nottingham 1850–51 (with John Thomas Emmett - now demolished)
- Albion Congregational Church, Sneinton Road, Nottingham 1855–56 (with Thomas Oliver).
- Scotch Baptist Chapel, East Circus Street, Nottingham 1858–59 (now demolished)
