= Beaufront Castle =

19th-century house in Northumberland, England

- Northumberland, England
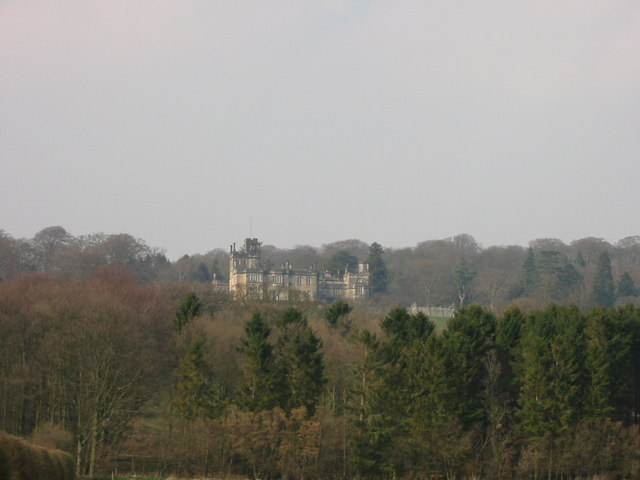

Location
- Location in Northumberland
- Coordinates: 54.988°N 2.058°W
- Grid reference: NY963659

Beaufront Castle is a privately owned 19th-century country house near Hexham, Northumberland, England. It is a Grade I listed building.

A pele tower was recorded at Beaufront in 1415. Dorothy Carnaby, heiress to the estate in the 16th century, married Gilbert Errington, and the Erringtons built a new house in the 17th century.

The property was acquired by the Cuthbert family in the early 19th century and the present imposing castellated Gothic revival style mansion was built, incorporating parts of the 17th-century house, between 1836 and 1841 to the design of architect John Dobson. William Cuthbert was High Sheriff of Northumberland in 1860.
