= Samuel Edward Cook =

English writer and naval officer (1787–1856)

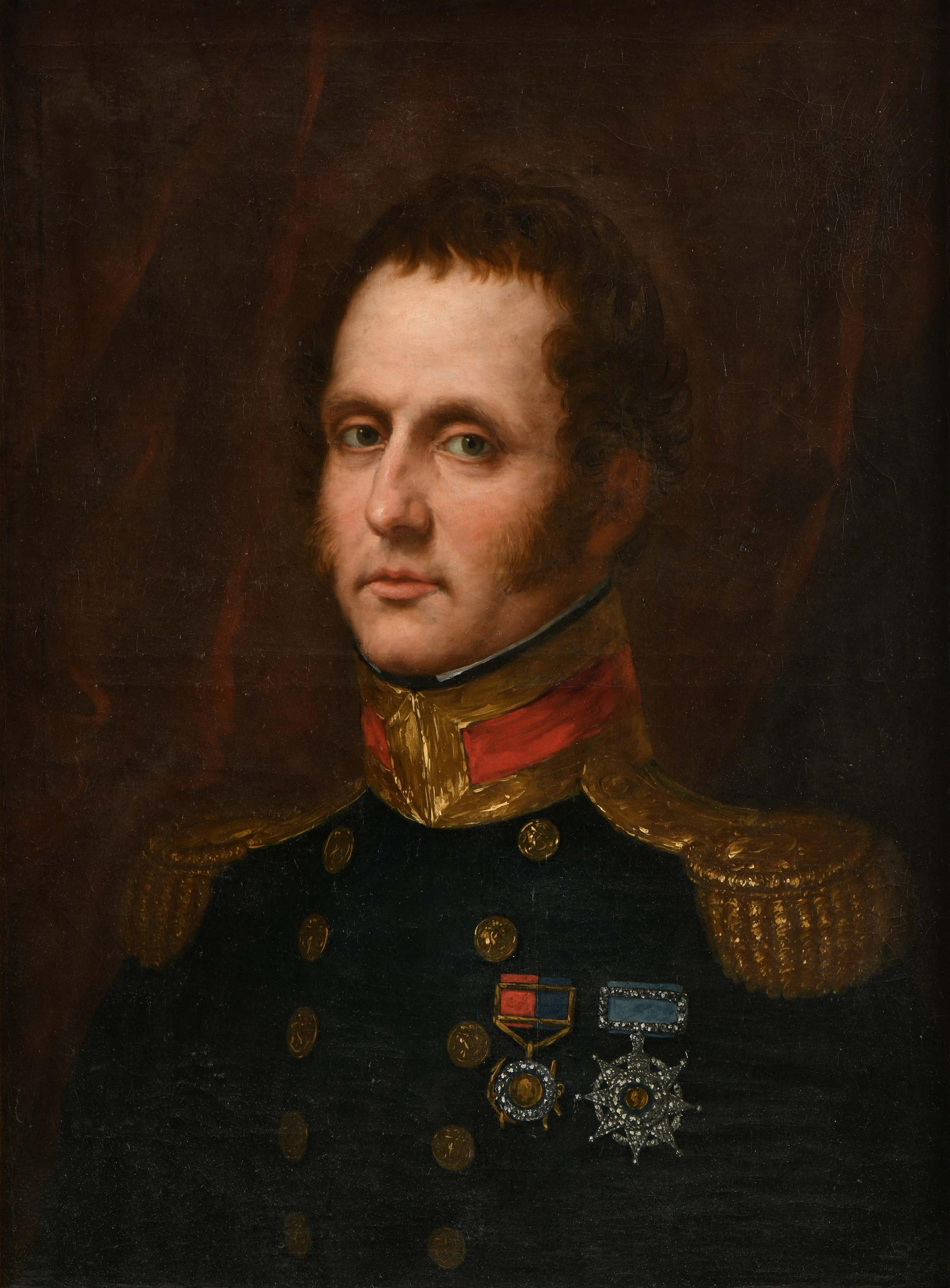
Portrait of Captain Samuel Edward Widdrington (né Cook), by José Gutiérrez de la Vega, c. 1830

Samuel Edward Widdrington (né Cook; 1787 – 11 January 1856) was an English writer and naval officer.

== Life ==
In 1840, he took the name of Widdrington, his mother being the heiress of some of the estates of that family. Having served in the Royal Navy he lived for some years in Spain, writing Sketches in Spain during the years 1829-1832 (London, 1834), and Spain and the Spaniards in 1843 (London, 1844). In 1842 he was elected a Fellow of the Royal Society.

He served as High Sheriff of Northumberland in 1854. He died at his residence, Newton Hall, Northumberland, in January 1856 and was succeeded in the ownership of his estates by his nephew, Shalcross Fitzherbert Jacson, who took the name Widdrington.

The name Widdringtonia conferred upon a genus of African coniferous trees in the Cupressaceae (cypress family) was Austrian botanist Stephan Endlicher's way of honouring Cook's great interest in Spain's coniferous forests, which the latter was among the first to detail scientifically. In 1831 he collected an Azure-winged Magpie - then known only from the Far East - in southern Spain which has since been given full species status as Iberian Azure-winged Magpie and the scientific name Cyanopica cooki in his honour

== See also ==
- O'Byrne, William Richard (1849). "Widdrington, Samuel Edward" . A Naval Biographical Dictionary . John Murray – via Wikisource.
