= Albion United Reformed Church, Nottingham =

Listed former church in Nottingham, England

Albion United Reformed Church
- New Albion
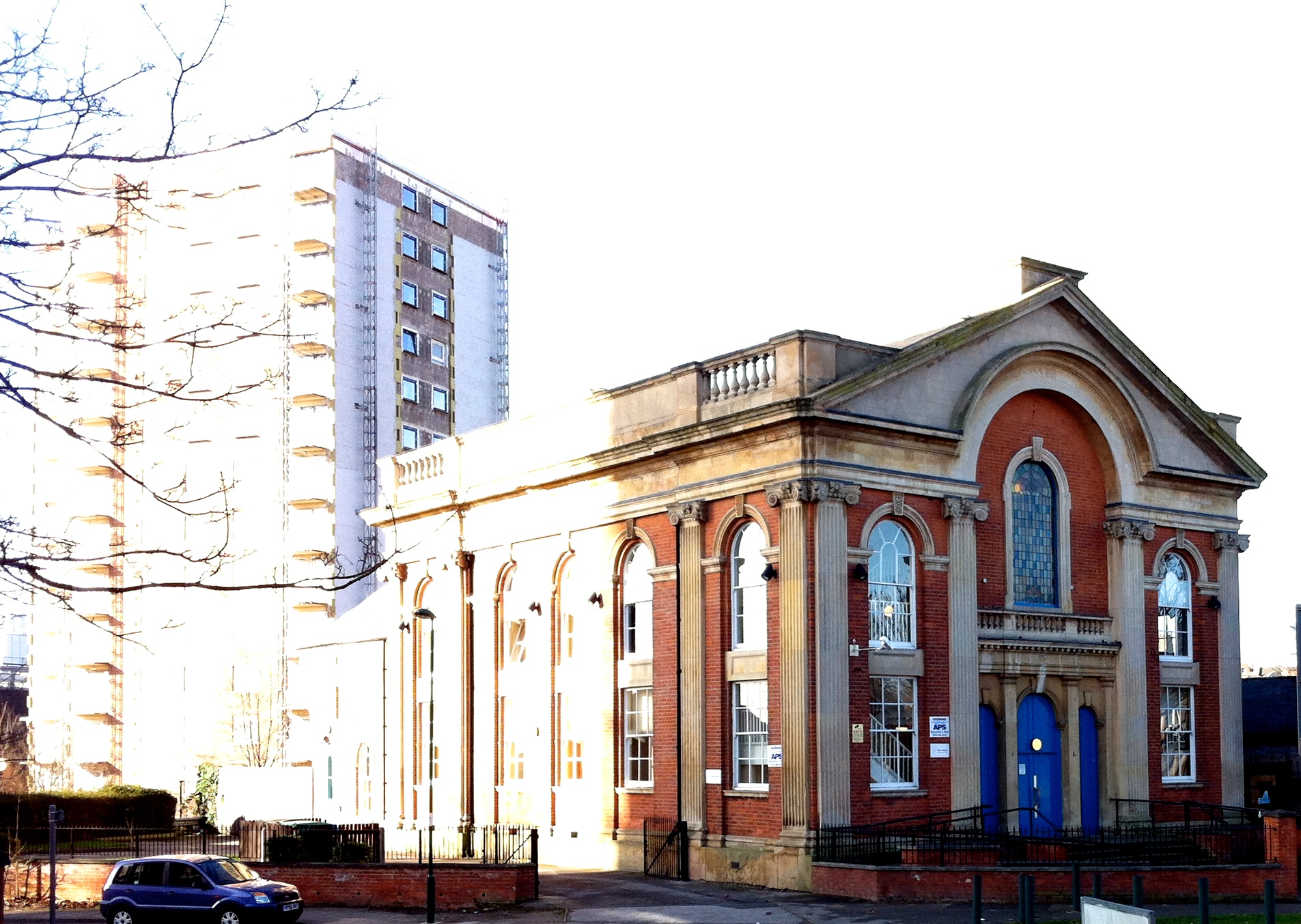
- The building in 2015

- Location within Nottinghamshire
- 52°57′9.42″N 1°08′3.24″W
- OS grid reference: SK 58213 39784
- Location: Sneinton Road, Sneinton, Nottingham
- Country: England
- Denomination: Congregational

Architecture
- Functional status: Residential (2004–present)
- Heritage designation: Grade II
- Designated: 30 November 1995
- Architect(s): Thomas Oliver, William Booker
- Architectural type: Church
- Style: Classical
- Groundbreaking: 1855
- Completed: 1856
- Closed: 1986

Specifications
- Length: 94 feet (29 m)
- Width: 47 feet (14 m)

Albion Congregational Church, subsequently Albion United Reformed Church and now New Albion, is a Grade II listed former church on Sneinton Road in Nottingham, England. Completed in 1856 to the designs of Thomas Oliver and William Booker, the church served as a major Congregational chapel in Sneinton before joining the United Reformed Church in the early 1970s and eventually closing for worship in 1986. It was later converted into residential accommodation.

== History ==
The church opened in 1895. It was built to designs by Thomas Oliver and William Booker. It was enlarged in 1904 with the addition of a rear extension and a chamber for the organ.

In the early 1970s, in common with most other Congregational Churches in England, the Albion Congregational Church joined the United Reformed Church. In 1986 faced with unaffordable repair and maintenance costs, the congregation joined The Dales United Reformed Church in Bakersfield.

On 30 November 1995, the church was designated a Grade II listed building.

Following its closure, the building stood unused until the early 2000s, when it was taken on by Framework Housing Association. In 2004 the former church was converted into 24 self‑contained flats to designs by Allan Joyce Architects. The building now operates as New Albion, providing supported accommodation for homeless people.

== See also ==
- Listed buildings in Nottingham (Dale ward)
