= Thomas Oliver (architect) =

English architect (1791–1857)

- Born: 14 January 1791; Crailing, Roxburghshire
- Died: 9 December 1857 (aged 66); 3 Picton Place, Newcastle upon Tyne
- Education: Apprenticed to James Lorimer; Pupil of John Dobson
- Occupation: Architect
- Spouse(s): Margaret Lorimer, 1814; Elizabeth Best, 1840

Thomas Oliver (14 January 1791 – December 1857) was an English classical architect and surveyor active in Newcastle upon Tyne. He was one of the numerous local architects who worked with Richard Grainger on the development of Newcastle, but his work tends to be overshadowed by that of John Dobson, who has been given a great deal of the credit for the central part of the city referred to as Grainger Town.

== Background ==
Thomas Oliver was born in Crailing, Roxburghshire on 14 January 1791, the son of weaver Adam Oliver (1749–1793) and Elizabeth Bell (1762–1829). He was educated at Jedburgh School. Oliver married twice, first in 1814 to Margaret Lorimer, the daughter of a Kelso mason, and second around 1840 to Elizabeth Best (1800–1886) from Yorkshire. He died unexpectedly on 9 December 1857 at 3 Picton Place, Newcastle upon Tyne. He was buried in Jesmond Old Cemetery (previously Newcastle General Cemetery).

His son from his first marriage was Thomas Oliver Junior (1824–1902), also an architect active in the North East. He built the Presbyterian (later URC) church in Blyth and the Congregational Church in Tynemouth, enlarged Jesmond Towers, and was active in the partnerships Oliver & Lamb, Oliver & Leeson and Oliver, Leeson & Wood in the later 19th century.

== Career ==
Oliver was apprenticed to stonemason James Lorimer of Kelso until 1814. He was "pupil and assistant" to John Dobson for six years until 1821, when he began independent practice as a "land surveyor and architect".

== Works ==
=== Blackett Street, north side, 1824 ===
In 1824, Oliver designed a row of 31 brick-built houses, built by Grainger on the north side of the newly built Blackett Street. These houses were demolished in the 1960s as part of the re-development, which produced the Eldon Square Shopping Centre.

=== Leazes Terrace, Leazes Crescent and Leazes Place, 1829 ===
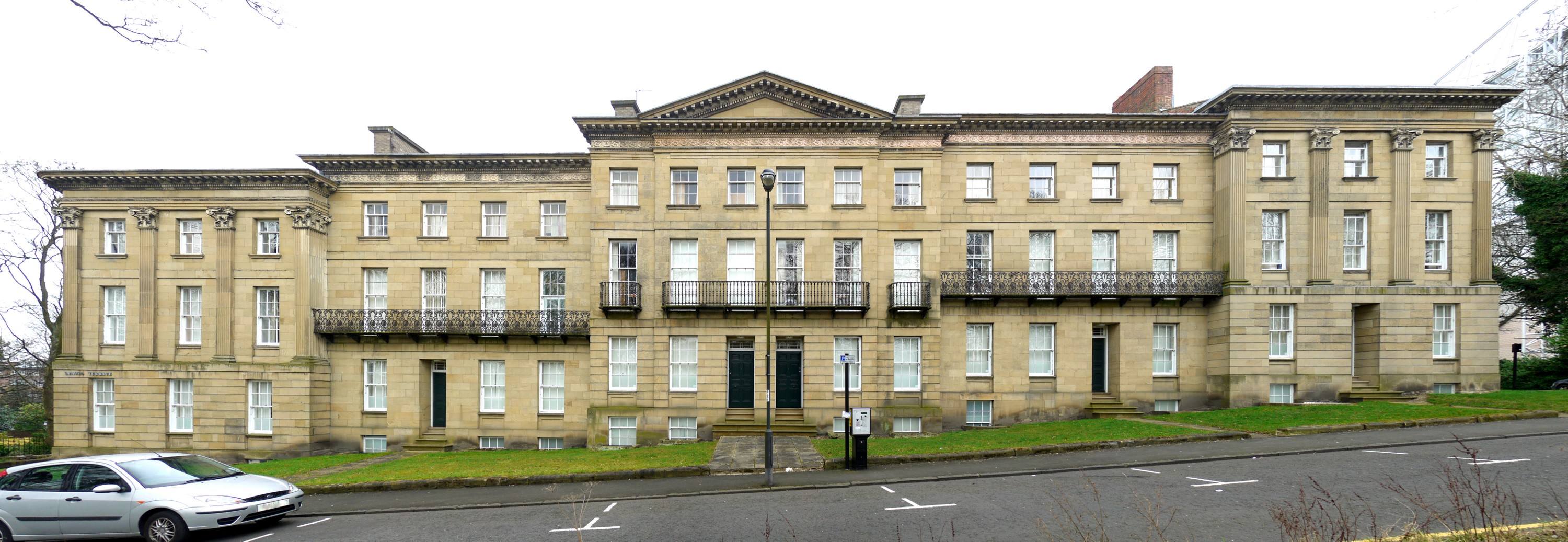
Leazes Terrace

In 1829, Oliver designed Leazes Terrace, an oblong block of 70 lofty houses in the classical style with small gardens in front and a paved terrace walk. The terrace took five years to complete. The scheme also included Leazes Crescent and Leazes Place, two streets of two-storey brick and stucco cottages. All three of Oliver's creations survive today, although Leazes Terrace is overshadowed by St James' Park football stadium. There was a certain amount of controversy caused by Dobson's daughter Jane, who wrongly claimed that Leazes Terrace and the other two streets were designed by Dobson. However documents from the period show that Oliver was the architect.

=== Royal Arcade, 1830–1832 ===
In 1830, Grainger began work on the Royal Arcade, a shopping arcade at the bottom of Pilgrim Street. There is some doubt as to who designed this. Dobson is usually given the credit, but it may have been Oliver. The building was completed in 1832 but was demolished in the 1960s.

== Land surveying, town plans and authorship, 1830–1851 ==
In 1830, Oliver produced a plan for the development of the town centre. This was six years after Dobson had produced his own unsuccessful plan and four years before Grainger produced a successful scheme. Dobson's plan had failed mainly because it had been over-ambitious and hugely expensive. Oliver's plans were not as ambitious as Dobson's and mostly dealt with straightening and extending existing streets to give better access to the town. However it was Grainger, perhaps through the influence of John Clayton, who had his plans accepted by the council.

Oliver is recognised for his work as a land surveyor. He published a number of plans of Newcastle between 1830 and 1851 (and one in 1858 posthumously). His obituary said:

Mr Oliver is well known as the author of several publications, in addition to his great work, the plan of Newcastle, published by him in different forms since the year 1830. At the time of his decease, he had just about completed a new plan of the town, and also a plan of the proposed Quayside improvements.

Oliver was the author of the A New Picture of Newcastle upon Tyne in 1831 and The Topographical Conductor, or Descriptive Guide to Newcastle and Gateshead in 1851. He laid out Gibson Town between 1836 and 1848, a planned development of modest houses. For his work in surveying the first railway line from Manchester to Liverpool, he was offered a knighthood, which he politely declined.

It has also been claimed that Oliver had an early hand in the design of Eldon Square. H.L. Honeymen, in a publication of 1831, claimed that Oliver was asked by the corporation to provide a design for Blackett Street and Eldon Square, which he then did. Apparently, the Council then asked for Dobson's opinion on the plans, and he provided a revised plan with several alterations. This leaves a rather confused picture as to whether Oliver or Dobson had the greater influence over the design of the square. The general opinion is that Eldon Square is Dobson's creation.

== Buildings ==
- Blackett Street (north side), Newcastle upon Tyne 1824(demolished 1960s)
- The Smith's Hall, Blackfriars, Newcastle upon Tyne (staircase extension) 1827–8
- Leazes Crescent, Newcastle upon Tyne 1829–1830
- Leazes Terrace, Newcastle upon Tyne 1829–1834
- Lloyds Bank, Durham Road, Gateshead 1840
- Trinity House, Newcastle (gateway and rebuilding of 3 houses) 1841 (possibly done by his brother Andrew)
- Londonderry Institute, Seaham 1853–1855
