= William John Henry Booker =

African-American physician (1882 – 1921)

- Born: William John Henry Booher; April 29, 1882; Concord, New Hampshire, US
- Died: April 24, 1921 (aged 39); Oxford, North Carolina, US
- Education: Tuskegee Institute (1902), Leonard Medical School (1908)
- Occupation: physician
- Title: First Lieutenant
- Spouse: Ida Mae Shaw (1909–1921)
- Children: 2

William John Henry Booker, M.D. (April 29, 1882 – August 24, 1921) was a prominent African-American physician situated in Oxford, North Carolina. He became a First Lieutenant Medical Officer following the United States's entry into World War I.

== Early life and family ==
Before he changed his name to an American variation of Booker, William's family name was recorded as 'Booher'. His father, William John Booher, had emigrated from Togoland in German-controlled West Africa. William's paternal grandfather was a native of Togoland named Wilhelm Jacomenah Hesslebac Boohah.

Booher's father emigrated to Canada before settling in America where he met Mary Ann Menafee. However, Booher died, leaving behind a wife and unborn child. William John Henry Booher was born on April 24, 1882, in Concord, New Hampshire.

Wanting her son to be more familiar with the African-American community, Mary Ann Booher moved her son to the South. They started in Winter Park, Florida, where William noticed the alarming difference in schooling. But when William was fourteen, his mother died, leaving him, not only alone but destitute. Knowing that his mother had intended to move to Tuskegee, he packed his things. With the help of several friends, William got himself situated and found a string of odd jobs to make ends meet. He didn't quit school, though, which strained his time and his budget. He entered the Tuskegee Institute, founded by author, Booker T. Washington. Soon it became apparent that young William was on the brink of destitution as he would enter school wearing the most ragged and dirty clothes. This got the attention of Mrs. Booker T. Washington, who arranged for the boy to borrow clothes from a local store. Struggling to make ends meet, Booher was able to graduate from high school and college in 1902. While in Tuskegee Institute, he was awarded the Joseph Frye prize.

Booker T. Washington, seeing the potential and dedication of the young man, offered a job to Booher at the school. Booher remained there for two years before entering Leonard Medical School. During medical school and the summer breaks, Booher used the tinsmithing he learned at Tuskegee to work on Pullman cars. While in college he was also very active in college athletics. Booher graduated from medical school in 1908 and earned his medical license in 1909 after being certified by the North Carolina Board of Medical Examinees.

Instead of moving back to Alabama, Booher remained in North Carolina and opened his own medical practice in Oxford.

== Military service ==
In 1917, the United States joined World War I and the entire nation was in a buzz to join the effort. After the declaration of war with Germany, many African-Americans were turned away from local recruiting stations. Unprepared for a large scale conflict, the United States Army had only four black regiments, and many commanders would not allow mixing of blacks and whites in their units. Also, the black regiments themselves were not trusted to be sent to Europe, as many of the higher ups possessed a lack of confidence in black soldiers as fighters. Fort Des Moines Provisional Army Officer Training School had been opened for training African-American men as there had been a huge influx of African-American volunteers and a petition was erected by the students of Howard University. However, there was still some discontent at the facility as many soldiers found that they were unfairly assessed for merely being black.

Booher volunteered in 1917 and was ranked First Lieutenant in the Army Reserve Medical Corps. He reported to Des Moines, Iowa for training and when completed Booher was assigned to the 92nd Divisions 317th Sanitary Train at Camp Funston, Kansas. However, soon after beginning his work in Funston, Lieutenant Booher was honorably discharged in December 1917. He had been deemed physically unfit for duty and never sailed with the rest of his unit to France.

== Career ==
Booher returned to his family in Oxford, North Carolina, and resumed work on his medical practice. During this period William Booher had renamed his family as 'Booker' and was from then on referred to as William Booker.

== Death ==
Three years after returning from the war, William Booker died of apoplexy (cardiac stroke).

== Personal life ==
On August 3, 1909, Booker had married Ida Mae Shaw, a native of Alabama. The couple had two children, Mary Louis and William John Henry Booher. After the death of her husband, Mrs. Booher moved her children to Atlanta, Georgia and became a school teacher. She never remarried. Her son William John Henry Booher went on to graduate from Morehouse College and is the Grandfather of William Jamel Booher.
