= Old Eldon Square =

Square in Newcastle-upon Tyne

Eldon Square
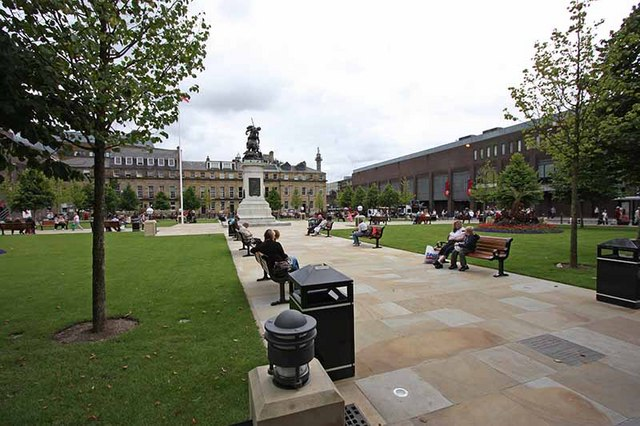
- The square viewed from the West
- Interactive map of Eldon Square
- Type: Public square
- Maintained by: Newcastle City Council
- Location: Newcastle upon Tyne, England
- Coordinates: 54°58′28″N 1°36′55″W

Construction
- Commissioned: 1824
- Construction start: 1825
- Completion: 1840; 186 years ago

Other
- Designer: John Dobson

Old Eldon Square is a public square, on Blackett Street in the English city of Newcastle upon Tyne, originally known as Eldon Square. As well as green space the square is the site of a war memorial and location for the city's Remembrance Day commemoration. The adjacent Eldon Square Shopping Centre is named after it.

The square itself is named after John Scott, 1st Earl of Eldon, a prominent local figure. He was born in Newcastle in 1751, the son of a coal owner, and later became a lawyer and politician. He held the position of Lord Chancellor twice.

== History ==
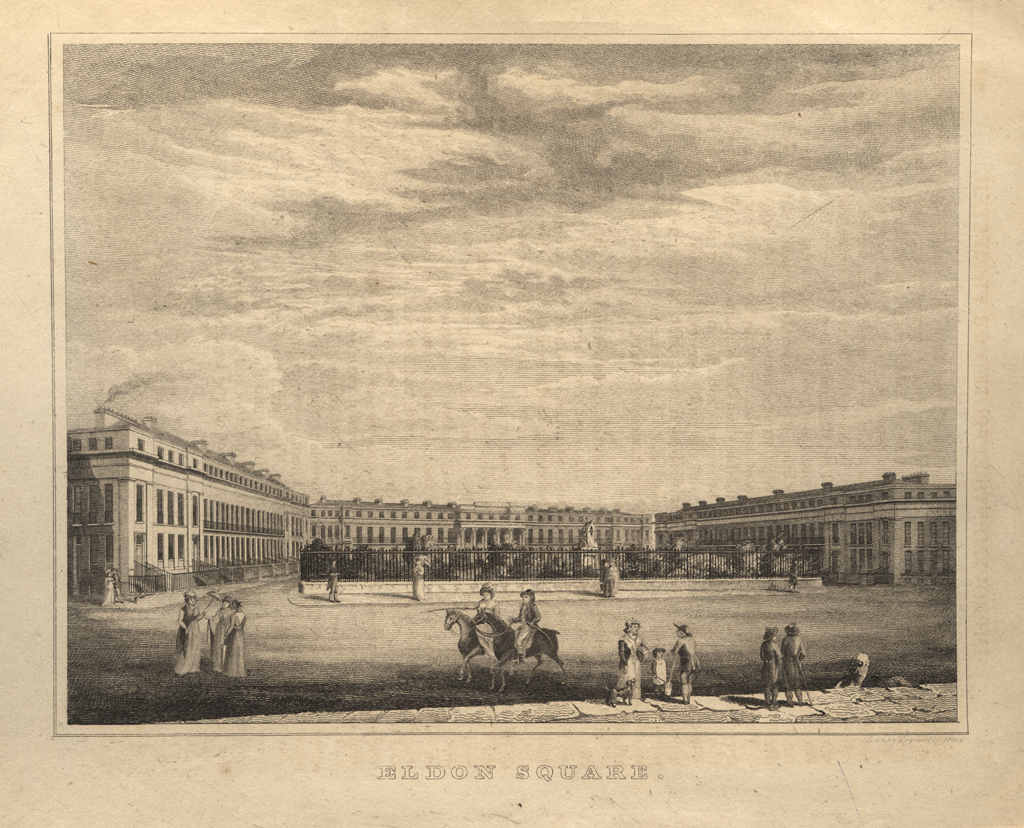
An engraving of the Square c. 1840s by William Collard.

Eldon Square was built as part of the 1825–40 reconstruction of Newcastle city centre.

In 1824 John Dobson was commissioned by Richard Grainger to produce designs for Eldon Square. The design was for three terraces facing a central square, each terrace being of two and a half storeys. The east and west terraces consisted of 27 bays of windows, whilst the north terrace had 39 bays. The first floors had continuous cast-iron balconies with Grecian honeysuckle decoration. Beyond this and the giant Doric pilasters at the end of each terrace there was no other decoration. The terraces were faced with finely cut ashlar.

The author and campaigner Harriet Martineau once stayed at number 28 for six months with her brother-in-law.

== The war memorial ==
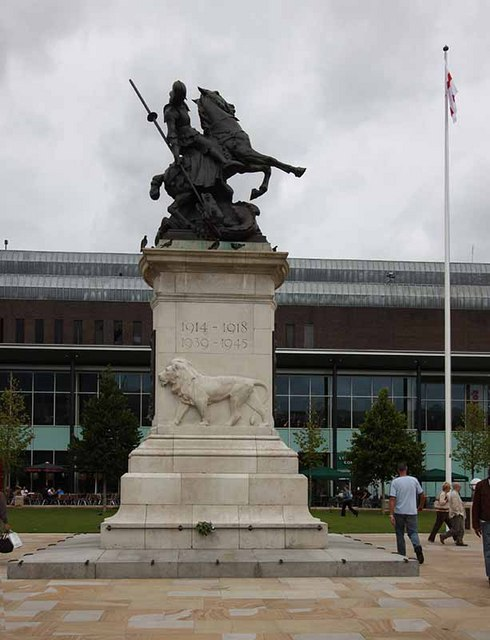
The war memorial (south side)

Designed by Charles Leonard Hartwell, and unveiled by Earl Haig in 1923, the war memorial is situated at the centre of the square. It is a large Portland stone pedestal, with a different relief on each of the four sides. They are:

North: the words "Memory Lingers Here" above a bronze sculptured wreath.
South: a sculptured picture of a lion below the dates 1914–1918 and 1939–1945.
East: a bronze relief of Justice, displaying two grieving women and a third (Lady Justice) holding the scales.
West: a bronze relief of Peace, displaying a woman with a child and the Angel of Peace.

On the top is a large bronze equestrian statue of Saint George, the patron saint of infantrymen and cavalrymen, slaying the dragon.

The pedestal was designed by Cackett and Burns. The memorial was restored in 1991 and 2007.

== Eldon Square Shopping Centre ==
In the 1970s the west and north terraces around the square were demolished to be replaced by part of Eldon Square Shopping Centre which now dominates Old Eldon Square. At the time a councillor had stated that the square would be maintained as "it is only the buildings surrounding the square that will be removed."

Some renovation was completed in 2008 and the square now features new landscaping and ground level access to the shopping centre.
