= Jesmond Old Cemetery =

Cemetery in Newcastle upon Tyne, England

Coordinates: 54.983945°N 1.599943°W

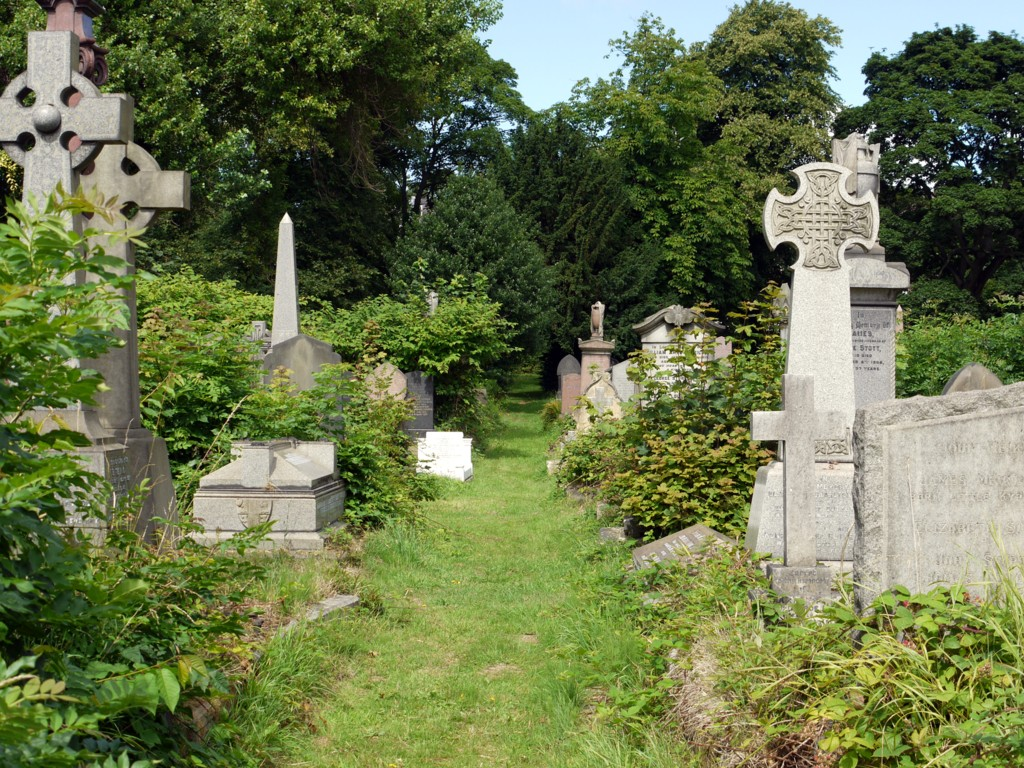
Jesmond Old Cemetery

Jesmond Old Cemetery is a Victorian cemetery in Newcastle upon Tyne, United Kingdom, founded in 1834. It contains two Grade II listed buildings and seven Grade II listed monuments as well as the graves of dozens of notable people from the history of Tyneside. The cemetery was designed by John Dobson who was himself later buried in the cemetery.

There are ten Commonwealth service personnel buried in this cemetery, eight from World War I and two from World War II.

Another notable burial is that of John Hancock (1808–1890), a noted ornithologist from Newcastle upon Tyne.
