= William Henry Booker =

- Born: 23 January 1826; Sneinton, Nottingham, England
- Died: 10 March 1896 (aged 70)
- Occupation: Architect

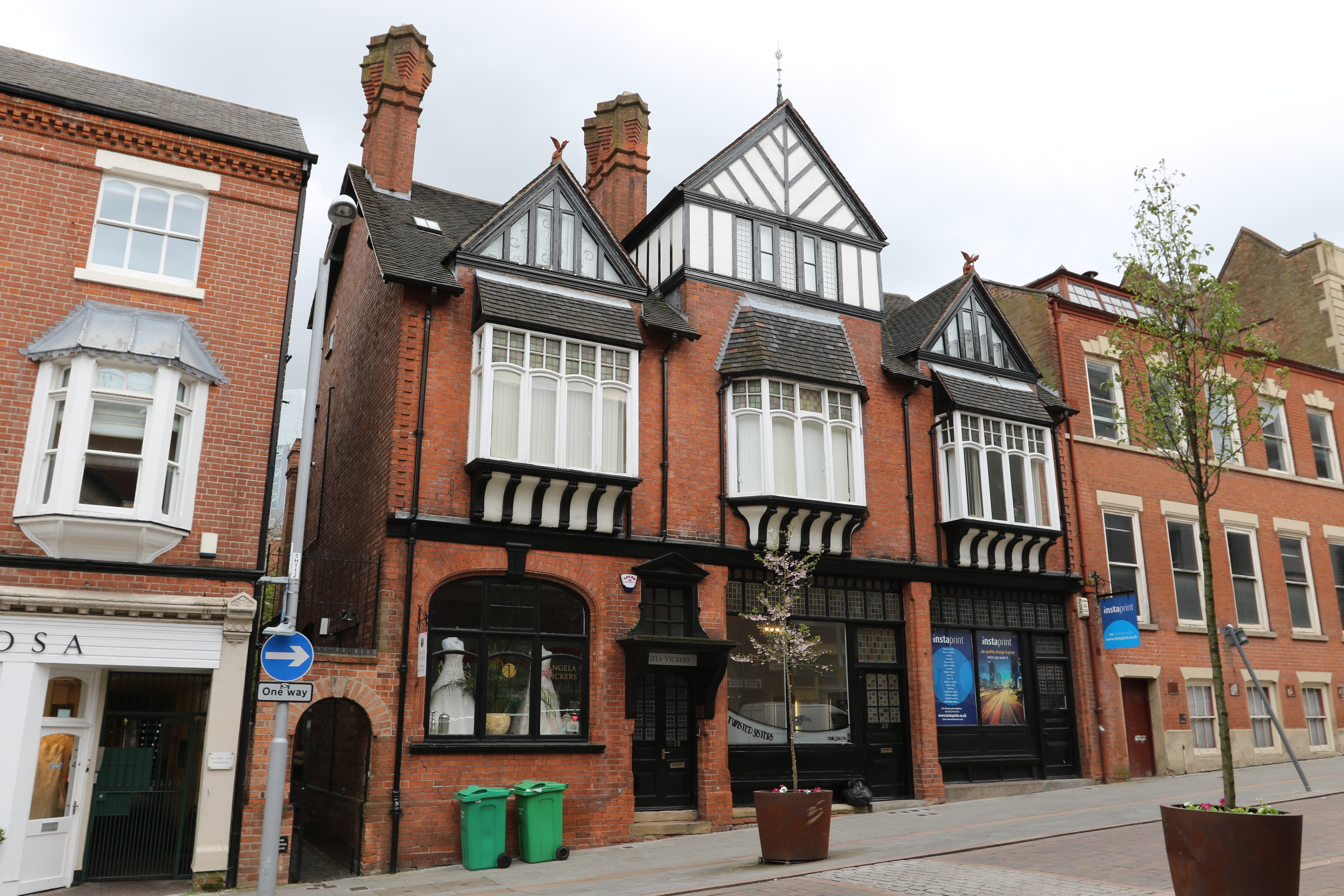
Shops on Heathcote Street, Nottingham 1882

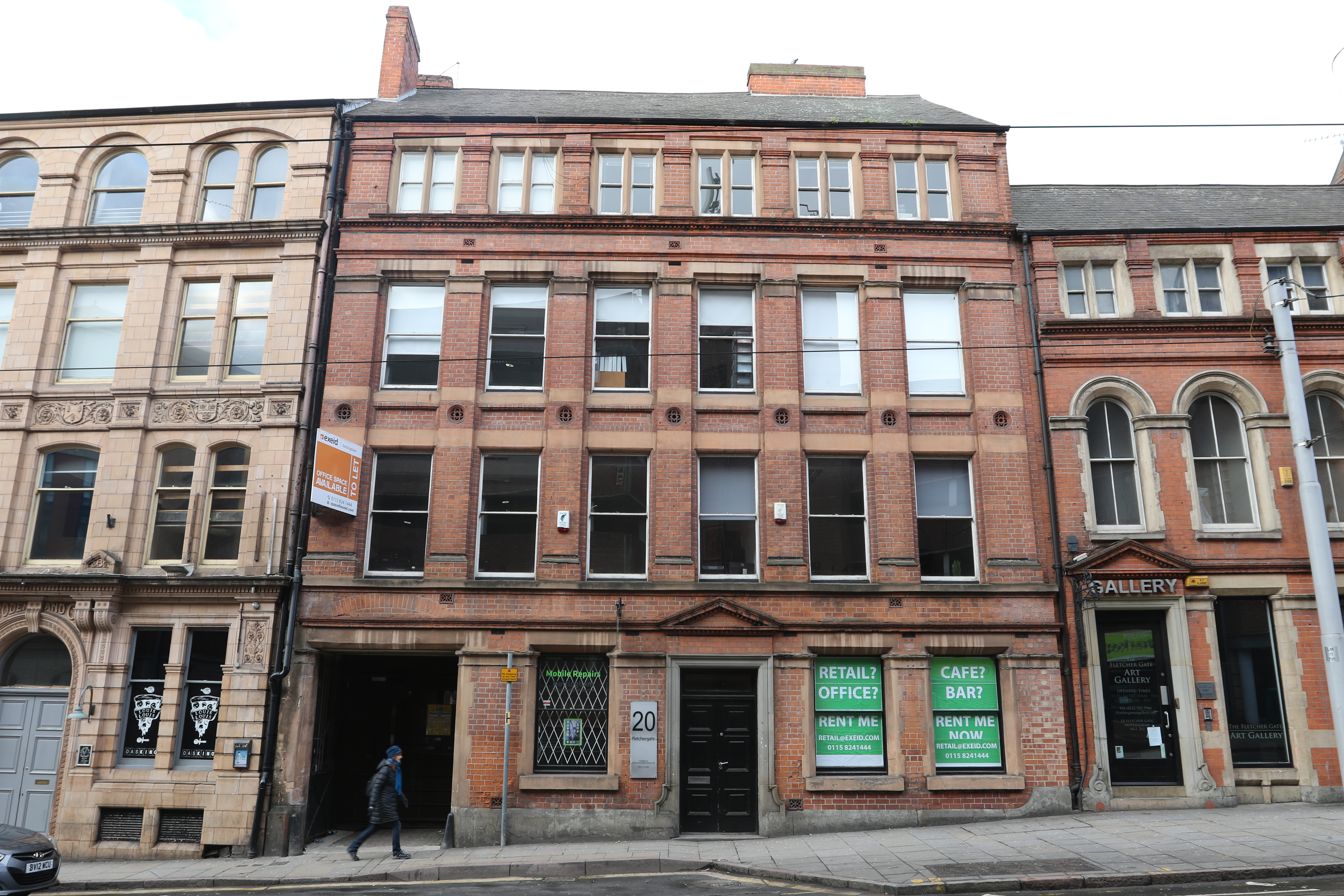
20 Fletcher Gate, Nottingham, 1883

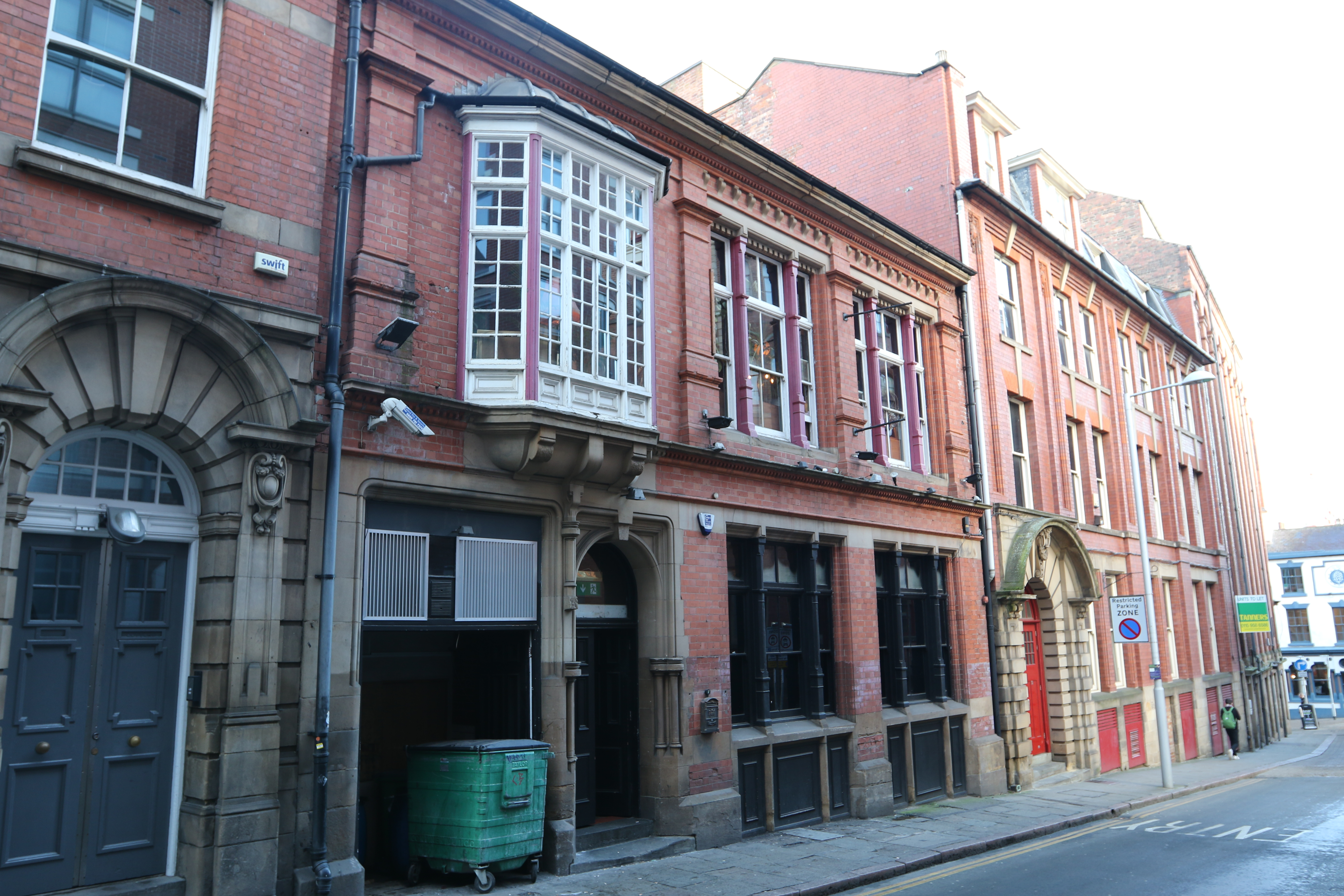
25 Warser Gate, Nottingham 1890–91

William Henry Booker FRHistS (23 January 1826 – 10 March 1896) was an English architect based in Nottingham.

He was born in Sneinton, Nottingham on 23 January 1826, the son of William Booker (architect and surveyor) and Eliza (d. 1884). He entered into partnership with his two younger brothers, Frederick Richard Booker (1827–1882) and Robert Booker and they worked from office on Short Hill, Nottingham as W & F. R Booker, and later W & F & R Booker.

He married Sarah (d. 17 May 1878).

In 1876 he was elected a Fellow of the Royal Historical Society in London.

He died on 10 March 1896 at Nottingham.

== Notable works ==
- Baptist Chapel, Lenton 1856–57
- Baptist Chapel, Queen Street, Ilkeston 1857-58
- 54a High Pavement, Nottingham with Robert Booker
- Lace Factory, 63–67 Mansfield Road, Nottingham 1881–82 (extension)
- Shops on Heathcote Street, Nottingham 1882 with Robert Booker and Frederic William Booker
- Warehouse, Riste’s Place/Barker Gate, Nottingham 1883 with Robert Booker
- 20 Fletcher Gate, Nottingham 1883 with Robert Booker
- 18 Fletcher Gate, Nottingham 1885 with Robert Booker
- Flying Horse Inn, Poultry, Nottingham 1875 (west gables) with Robert Booker
- Housing in streets surrounding St. Stephen's Church, Sneinton, Nottingham 1888 onwards with Robert Booker
- Warehouse, 25 Warser Gate, Nottingham 1890–91 with Robert Booker and Frederic William Booker
- 15 Commerce Square, Nottingham 1897–98 with Robert Booker and Frederic William Booker
