= George Handyside =

English businessman (1821-1904)

- Born: 1821
- Died: 1904 (aged 82–83)
- Occupation: Businessman

George Handyside was born into a poor working family in 1821 at Newton on the Moor near Felton, Northumberland. At age 26, he moved to Berwick with 17 shillings and within a few years, he owned a shoe factory employing over 100 people.

== Career ==
During the 1850s, Handyside opened his first store and within 10 years, he had 50 stores from Newcastle to Aberdeen. During his lifetime, Handyside became a business magnate within the north east with ventures including running farms, operating omnibuses and property developing.

Handyside built many homes in the west end of Newcastle and in 1888 he moved into one of the houses he had built in Bentinck Terrace where he opened his surgery. Handyside manufactured a ‘medicinal cure’ which he marketed as a cure for nerves, digestion, rheumatism, toothache, and a blood purifier. His most popular product was an elixir which Handyside claimed to cure alcoholism and quickly became a renowned product sold nationally. Handyside published his own book titled Every Man Should Be His Own Doctor which sold over a million copies.

Around 1900, Handyside began work on a 90-shop development in Newcastle on Percy Street. The development was named the Handyside Arcade and was completed in 1906 and it stood until 1987 when it was demolished to make way for Eldon Garden shopping centre.

== Death ==
Handyside died in 1904 before the arcade was completed; he never married and had no children. At the time of his death, Handyside was worth around one million pounds; he left bequests of £92,000 to local charities including the Northern Counties Orphan Institute and Newcastle Eye Infirmary.

A monument to George Handyside can be found within St Johns Cemetery on Elswick road minutes walk from the houses he built, lived, and worked in. Parts of the Handyside Arcade were acquired by Beamish Museum.

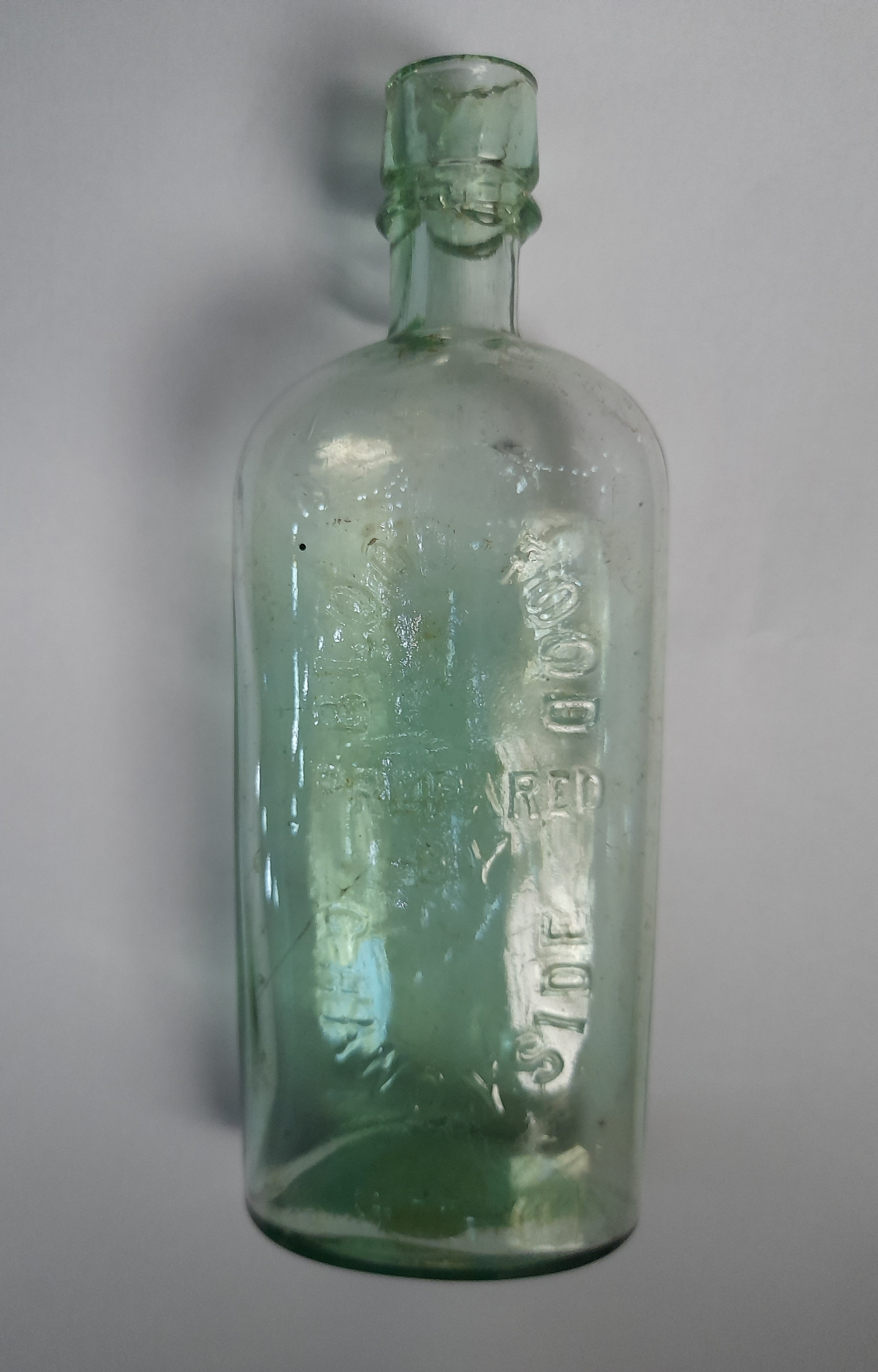
Handyside's Blood Food bottle. C19th aqua glass

== Bibliography ==
- George Handyside, Newcastle Entrepreneur and Quack Vendor by Alan Blakeman, published by David Robertson; ISBN 9780953332816
