= John Dobson (architect) =

English architect (1787–1865)

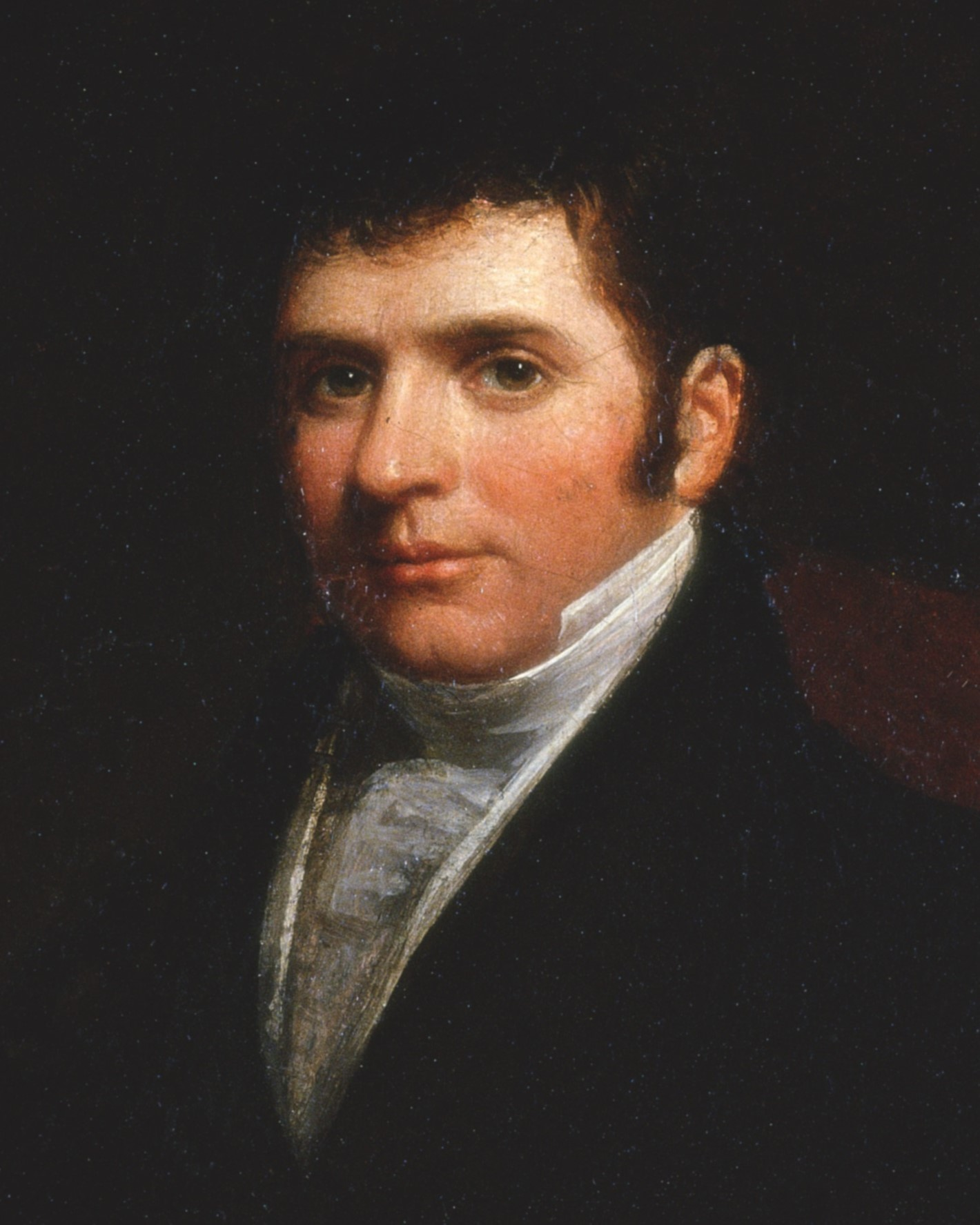
- Portrait of John Dobson c. mid-1820s, by William Dixon
- Born: 9 November 1787; North Shields, England
- Died: 8 January 1865 (aged 77)
- Resting place: Jesmond Old Cemetery
- Occupation: Architect
- Buildings: Newcastle railway station, Church of St Thomas the Martyr, Old Eldon Square, Grainger Market
- Projects: Grainger Town

John Dobson (9 December 1787 – 8 January 1865) was a 19th-century English neoclassical architect. During his life, he was the most noted architect in Northern England. He designed more than 50 churches and 100 private houses, but he is best known for designing Newcastle railway station and his work with Richard Grainger developing the neoclassical centre of Newcastle. Other notable structures include Nunnykirk Hall, Meldon Park, Mitford Hall, Lilburn Tower, St John the Baptist Church in Otterburn, Northumberland, and Beaufront Castle.

== Early life ==
Dobson was born on 9 December 1787 in High Chirton, North Shields, in what is now the Pineapple Inn. He was the son of an affluent market gardener, John Dobson, and his wife Margaret.

Educated in Newcastle, he had an exceptional gift for drawing as a young child. Aged 11, he took the role of Hournary Draftsman for a well-renowned local damask weaver producing designs and sketches. At 15, he was placed as a pupil with David Stephenson, the leading architect-builder in Newcastle and the designer of All Saints' Church and the original Theatre Royal on Mosley Street. Dobson completed his studies in 1810, when he was 23.

He left Newcastle to study art in London as a pupil of the watercolourist John Varley. At first, Varley refused the offer of Dobson studying under him, saying he could not spare the time. However, upon seeing his disappointment, he agreed to give him lessons and quickly developed a mutual rapport. During his time in London, he formed lasting friendships with the likes of J. M. W. Turner, William H. Hunt, William Mulready and Robert Smirke. His Friends strongly encouraged him to stay and work in London, but he was back in Newcastle by 1811 assisting Sir Charles Monck design Belsay Hall. Monck, a passionate devotee of Grecian art and architecture, is thought to have strongly influenced Dobson, who adopted that architectural style in many of his future works. At the time, Dobson and Ignatius Bonomi in County Durham were the only practising architects between York and Edinburgh. The first building Dobson designed is unclear, but his daughter maintained it was North Seaton Hall, near Ashington, built in 1813 and demolished in 1960.

== Country houses ==
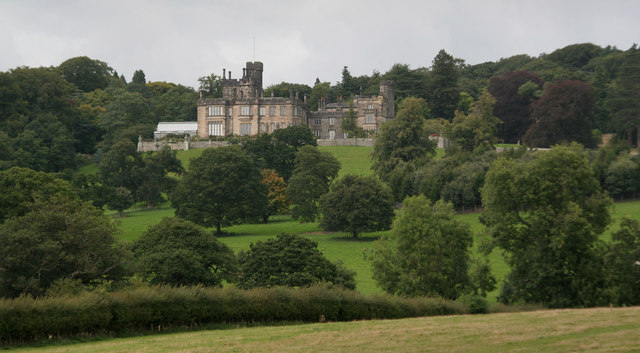
The grade I listed Beaufront Castle, overlooking the Tyne Valley, designed by Dobson 1835–1841

Dobson was very versatile and could design in Gothic or Tudor style if his clients desired, but Georgian was his preferred style. His country houses are not well-known, as they generally are privately held, not large enough to be open to the public, and landscaped behind parkland and trees. Architectural features of Dobson country houses include the use of golden sandstone, Corinthian or Ionic pillared entrance porticos, elegant staircases with beautiful ironwork balustrades leading to an upper gallery with matching iron balustrades, and an entry hall with a domed ceiling and glass centrepiece. Often the ground-floor design includes a curved or bow end at one side of the house, like Nunnykirk Hall and Longhirst Hall. The quality of the stonework in all Dobson homes is superb, and it is believed that he regularly used the same team of stonemasons as he did with other craftsmen he employed.

== Plans for Newcastle ==
In 1824, several years before Richard Grainger did the same, Dobson presented plans to the council to purchase and develop Anderson Place in Newcastle's centre. Dobson proposed a Mansion House as a "civic palace" with grand squares linked by wide tree-lined streets. Dobson's scheme called for an elegant city centre, but it was hugely expensive, and he lacked financial backing. Grainger's later Newcastle plan was not as grand but showed greater business acumen, a reason it was accepted.

== Church of St Thomas the Martyr ==
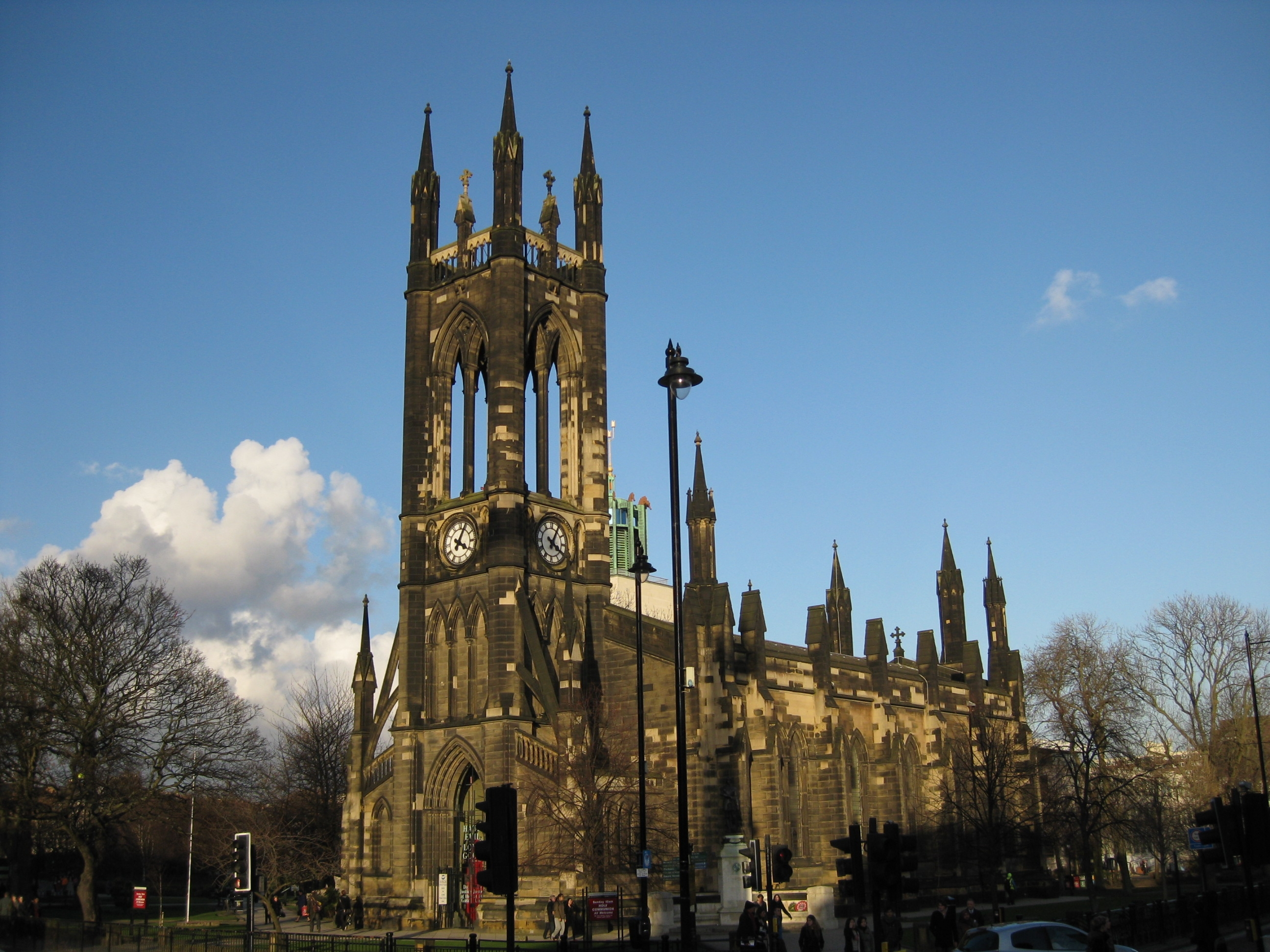
St Thomas the Martyr, Newcastle, by John Dobson

In 1820, the Newcastle City Council authorized the demolition of the Chapel of St Thomas the Martyr at the north end of the Tyne Bridge so the road could be widened. The council chose Barras Bridge on Magdalene Meadow, belonging to St Mary Magdalene Hospital, as the location for the new chapel. Dobson designed it in the modified Gothic style in 1827, featuring a novel hollow tower. Construction was completed by 1830, at the cost of £6,000. Dobson also designed the Watergate Building, Sandhill, which replaced the demolished Chapel of St. Thomas the Martyr.

== Central Station ==
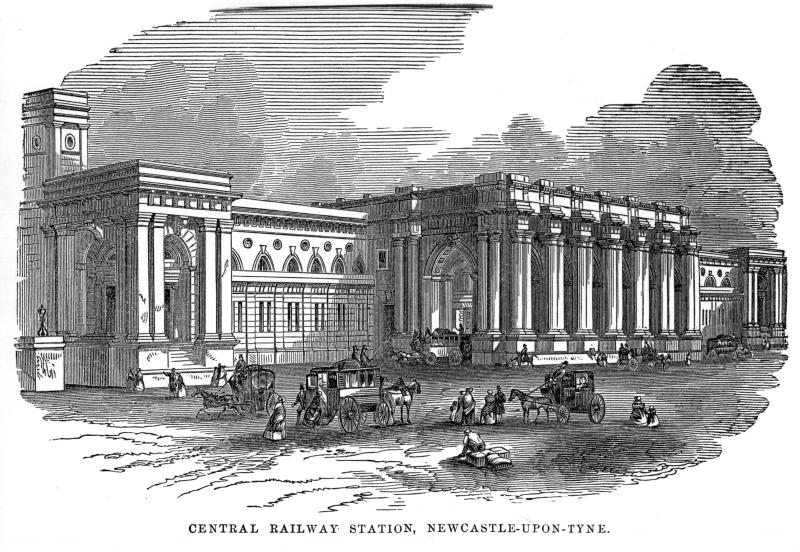
Newcastle railway station, by John Dobson but with a later portico by Thomas Prosser

In 1849 the High Level Bridge was built over the River Tyne, bringing the railway to Newcastle and north to Scotland. A suitably impressive station was required for a thriving town such as Newcastle, and Dobson provided it in his plans. His original plan of 1848 showed an ornate façade with a vast portico having double colonnades and an Italianate tower at the east end. Behind this was an enormous train shed made up of three arched glass roofs built in a curve on an 800-foot (240 m) radius. This design won an award at the Paris Exhibition of 1858. Unfortunately, Dobson was forced to alter his plans to produce a much less substantial portico and remove the Italianate tower. The station was completed in 1850 without the planned portico, and it was not until 1863 that this was added.

John Dobson argued for the role of the architect in building railway stations, and his Newcastle Central is regarded by many as the finest in England. According to Gordon Biddle and Oswald Nock in The Railway Heritage of Britain: "Undoubtedly it would have been one of the finest 19th-century classical buildings in Europe had it been completed... Even so, Newcastle Central today is magnificent inside for its spectacular combination of curves and outside for its sheer size and length". The train shed at Newcastle, the authors state, "was the first of the great arched roofs and represented a bold step forward which was copied by others". It was the first use of malleable rolled iron ribs – indeed the first large glass and iron vault in England, predating the Crystal Palace. Gibson Kyle, Dobson's nephew, was the clerk of works on this project.

== The Royal Arcade ==
In 1830, the Newcastle City Council rejected Richard Grainger’s proposed corn exchange on a site at the bottom of Pilgrim Street, opposite Mosley Street. Grainger then built a Dobson-designed shopping arcade on the site, known as the Royal Arcade, completed in 1832. Modelled after an elegant London shopping arcade, it had two office blocks facing Pilgrim Street and Manor Chare. The two were connected by a narrow block that formed the arcade. The arcade's front façade had six fluted Corinthian columns, and its interior was 250 feet (76 m) long with an arched Grecian-style ceiling with several domed skylights. Although elegant, the Royal Arcade was not a commercial success. It was located too far from the town centre's main shopping areas. Demolition was considered as early as the 1880s, but the arcade survived until the 1960s.

== Eldon Square ==
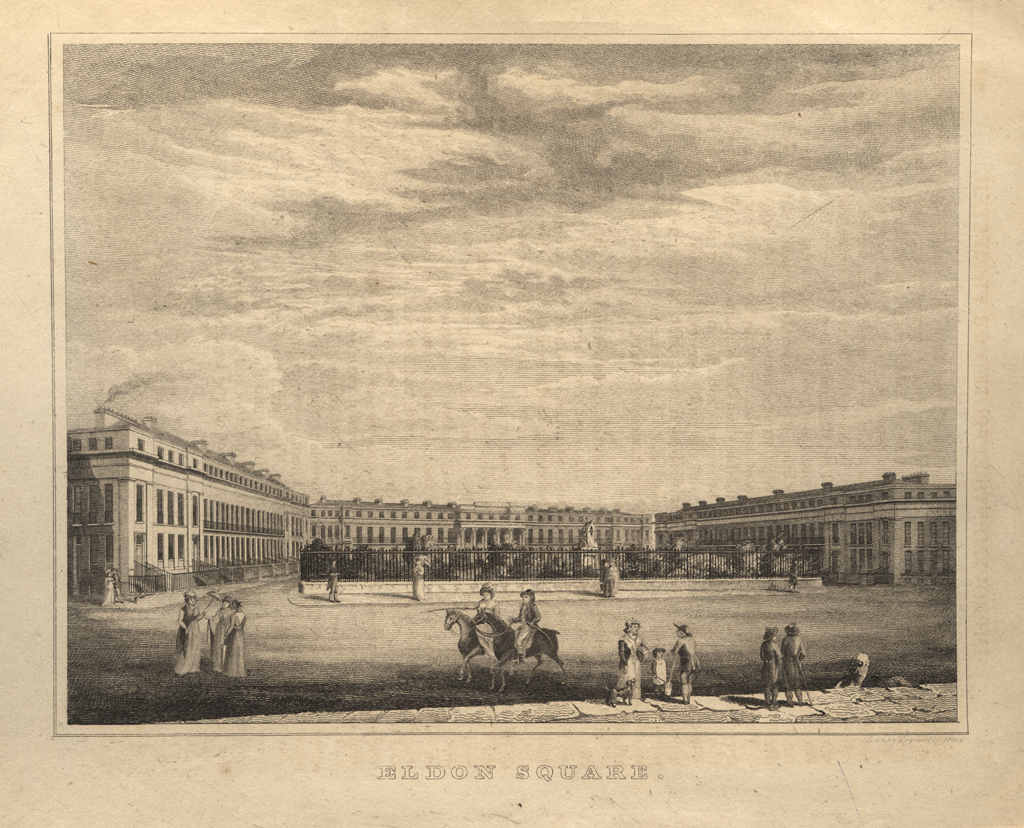
An engraving of Old Eldon Square c. 1840 by William Collard

In 1824, Richard Grainger commissioned Dobson to produce designs for Eldon Square. Dobson's clean Grecian-inspired design had three two and story terraces facing a central square. The east and west terraces had 27 bays of windows, and the north terrace had 39 bays. The first floors had continuous cast-iron balconies with Grecian honeysuckle decoration. Giant Doric pilasters at the end of each terrace were faced with finely cut ashlar, more elegant and clean than the stucco used extensively in London at the time. Only the east terrace survives, as the other two were demolished by 1973 for the Eldon Square Shopping Centre.

== Grainger Market ==
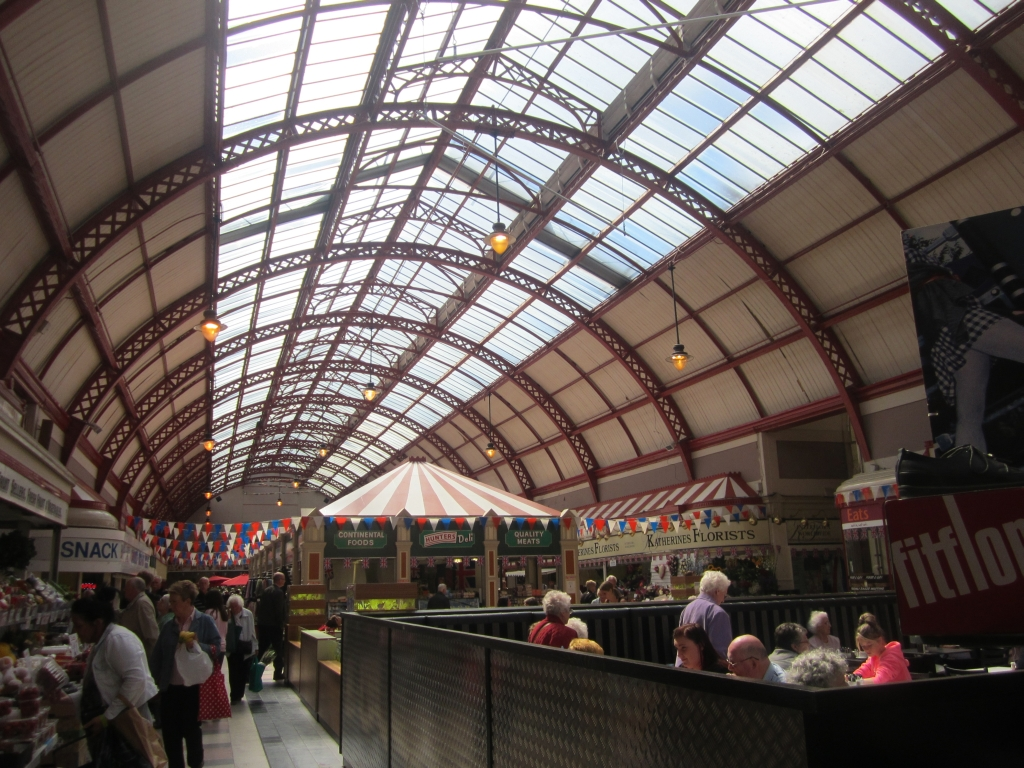
Interior of the Grainger Market, Newcastle, by John Dobson

Grainger's plans for the development of Newcastle town centre involved the demolition of the existing flesh market. Grainger, therefore, offered to build a new meat market and vegetable market. The meat market was placed between two new streets, Grainger Street and Clayton Street, and the vegetable market was placed on the west side of Clayton Street. Both were designed by Dobson. The meat market had pilastered arcades, 360 windows, fanlights and wooden cornices, and four avenues each 338 feet (103 m) long. It contained 180 butchers' shops when it opened. The vegetable market was given an open-plan layout, 318 feet (97 m) long, 57 feet (17 m) wide and 40 feet (12 m) high, with a fine timber roof. In 1835, to celebrate the opening of the markets, a grand dinner was given in the vegetable market, with 2,000 guests and presided over by the Mayor. Surprisingly, in the after-dinner speeches, no mention was made of Dobson.

== Grey Street ==
The crowning piece of Grainger's plan for the development of Newcastle was a new street leading up from Dean Street to intersect with Blackett Street. Originally called Upper Dean Street, it was eventually renamed Grey Street. Dobson was originally credited for the whole street's design (by Pevsner for one), possibly due to his daughter's assertions. It is now believed that Dobson was responsible only for the east side from Shakespeare Street to Mosley Street, and architects from Grainger's office, John Wardle and George Walker, designed the west side.

== Contribution to Grainger Town ==
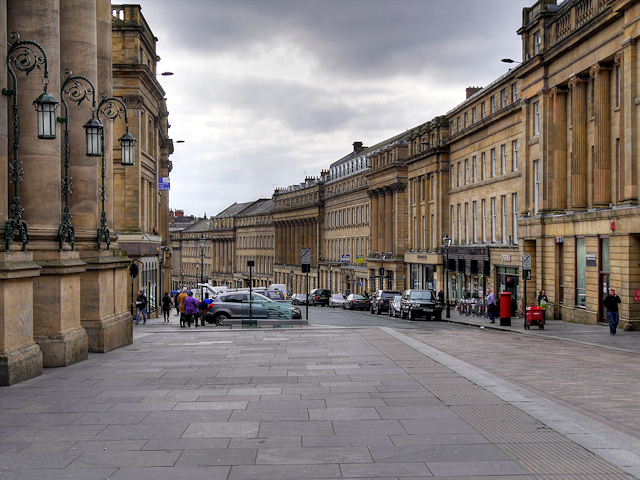
Grey Street, Grainger Town in 2016

Richard Grainger exercised close control over the master plan for Grainger Town and the quality of the work. John Dobson is given much of the credit for the detailed design, but other architects made significant contributions, especially Thomas Oliver and John and Benjamin Green. Substantial work was also done by two architects in Grainger's office, John Wardle and George Walker. They designed the west side of Grey Street, as well as Grainger Street, Clayton Street and Market Street. Dobson's daughter, Jane, confused crediting by claiming her father did the work of other architects. For instance, she claimed that Dobson designed Leazes Terrace and Leazes Crescent, although Thomas Oliver actually designed them.

== Break with Grainger ==
In 1841, Grainger, unknown to Dobson, had serious financial difficulties and owed Dobson a large sum of money for his work. Grainger attempted to reduce the indebtedness by charging Dobson £250 for a staircase and painted ceiling removed from Anderson Place. Dobson thought the amount was outrageous and an underhanded trick, expressing his indignation to Grainger in various surviving letters. It is believed these circumstances led to the final break of their professional relationship.

== Personal life ==
Dobson married Isabella, the eldest daughter of Alexander Rutherford of Warburton House, Gateshead. She had great artistic talent and was an excellent painter of miniatures. They had three sons and five daughters. His youngest son, Alexander, Ralph, Dobson born November 1834, inherited his father's artistic genius, gaining first prize in architecture at University College. He had just returned to his father's office full of enthusiasm to work when he was killed aged just 19 in the great explosion on Gateshead quayside on 4 October 1854 whilst helping to extinguish the Great fire of Newcastle and Gateshead.

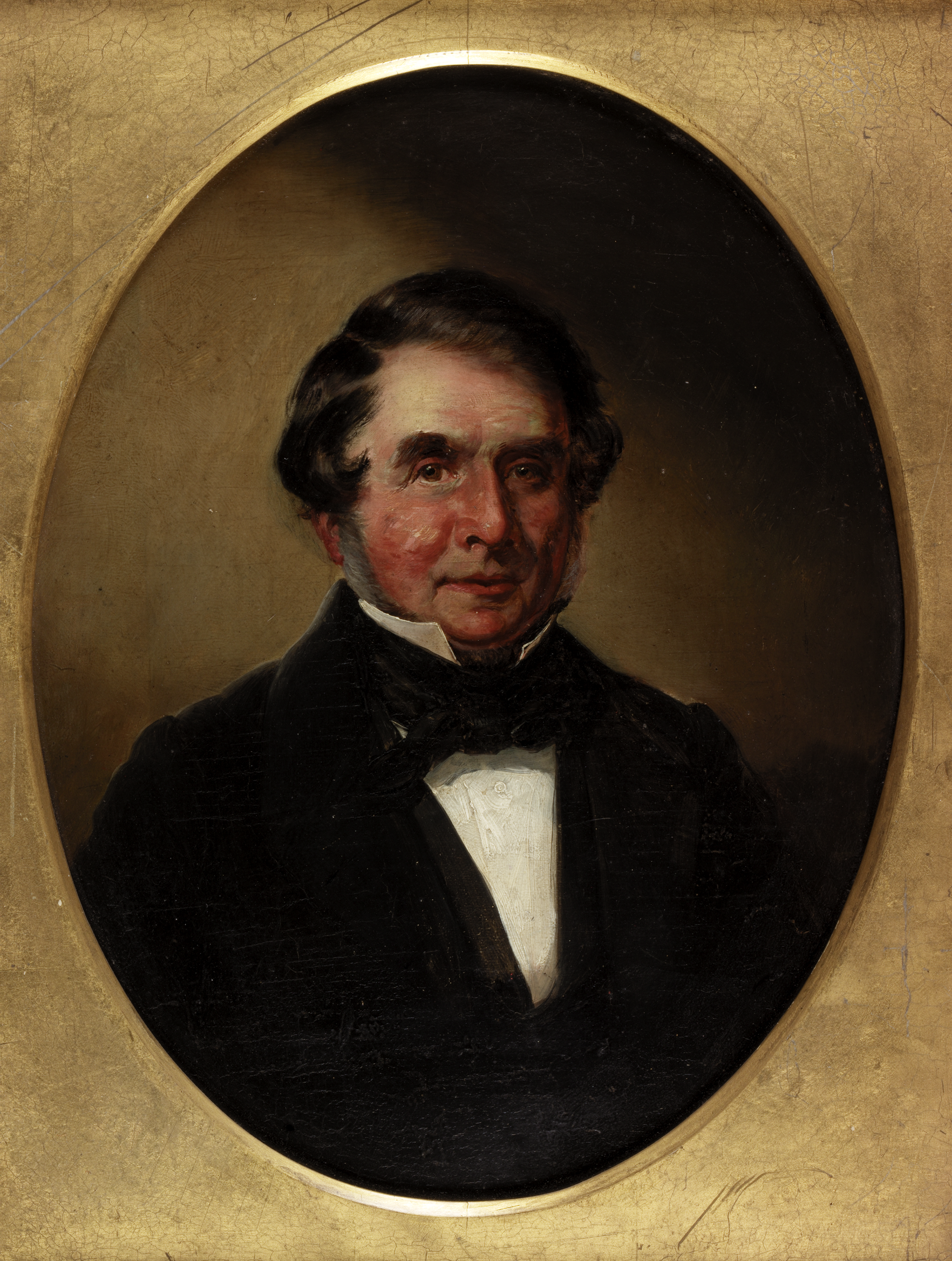
An older John Dobson, c. mid-1820s

== Later life ==
Dobson's wife, Isabella, died at 51 in 1846. Thirteen years later, in 1859, he was elected first President of the newly formed Northern Architectural Association at 72. He suffered a stroke, from which he never fully recovered, and retired in 1863. He lived for a time in Ryton but died on 8 January 1865 at 77 in his home at 15 New Bridge Street, leaving a comfortable £16,000 fortune. He is buried in Jesmond Old Cemetery, where a memorial was erected circa 1905.

The house in which Dobson died still stands. It was fully restored in 2019 after having been the Oxford Galleries and a series of nightclubs.

== List of major works with dates ==
- Belsay Hall (as assistant to Sir Charles Monck), Belsay (1810–1817)
- The Scottish Presbyterian Church, North Shields (later a Salvation Army hall)
- Newbrough Hall (1812)
- North Seaton Hall near Ashington (1813) (demolished 1960)
- Prestwick Lodge (later Prestwick Hall), Ponteland (1815)
- Sandyford Park (later Nazareth House), Newcastle (1817)
- Doxford Hall near Embleton (1818)
- Morpeth Gaol and Courthouse (1822–1828), the gaol was demolished in 1891 but the courthouse is still extant.
- Newcastle Gaol, Carliol Square (1823), (demolished 1925)
- Angerton Hall, Hartburn (1823)
- Mitford Hall, Mitford (1823–1829)
- Eldon Square, Newcastle (1824–1826), (partially demolished 1969, nos. 1-4 remain)
- Nunnykirk Hall, near Netherwitton (1825)
- Church of St Thomas the Martyr, Barras Bridge, Newcastle (1825)
- Numerous houses, villas and terraces in the New Bridge/Pandon area, Newcastle (1820s) (of these only Dobson's own house at New Bridge Street West survives)
- Lying-In Hospital, New Bridge Street, Newcastle (1826)
- Scotch Church, North Bridge Street, Monkwearmouth (1827) (demolished 1891)
- St Mary's Place, Newcastle (1829)
- Longhirst Hall, Morpeth (1824)
- Benwell Towers, Newcastle (1831)
- Royal Arcade, Newcastle (1831–32), (demolished 1969)
- Meldon Park, near Morpeth (1832)
- Holme Eden Abbey, Wetheral, (1833–1837)
- Grainger Market, Newcastle (1835)
- Nos. 18 - 96 (even) Grey Street, Newcastle (1836)
- Beaufront Castle, Sandhoe parish, near Hexham (1835–1841)
- Newcastle General Cemetery (later Jesmond Cemetery) (1836).
- Carlton Terrace, Jesmond, Newcastle (1840)
- Market Keeper's House and Office of Cattle Market, Newcastle (1842)
- Lilburn Tower, near Wooler (1842)
- Church of St James, Newcastle, (1833)
- Collingwood Monument (base and plinth), Tynemouth, (1845)
- Royal Station Hotel, Newcastle, (1847–1850)
- Flax Mill (now the Cluny public house), Ouseburn Valley (1848)
- Church of St Cuthbert, Consett, (1849–50)
- Central railway station, Newcastle (1849–50)
- Elswick Dene, Newcastle (1850)
- Barber Surgeons Hall, Newcastle (1851)
- Dobson Wing of Newcastle Infirmary, Newcastle (1852–1855) (demolished 1954)
- Warrington Museum & Art Gallery, Warrington 1855–1857
- Hartlepool Cemetery, now known as Spion Kop Cemetery Local Nature Reserve (1856)
- Clayton Memorial Church (Jesmond Parish Church), Jesmond, Newcastle (1857–61)
- East end of Hexham Abbey (1858)
- Church of St Edward the Confessor, Sudbrooke, Lincolnshire (1860).
- Jesmond Dene Banqueting Hall, Newcastle (1860–1862)

== Sources ==
- Allsopp, Bruce; Clark, Ursula (1969). Historic Architecture of Northumberland. Newcastle upon Tyne: Oriel Press. ISBN 0-85362-062-8.
