= Hyson Green Baptist Church =

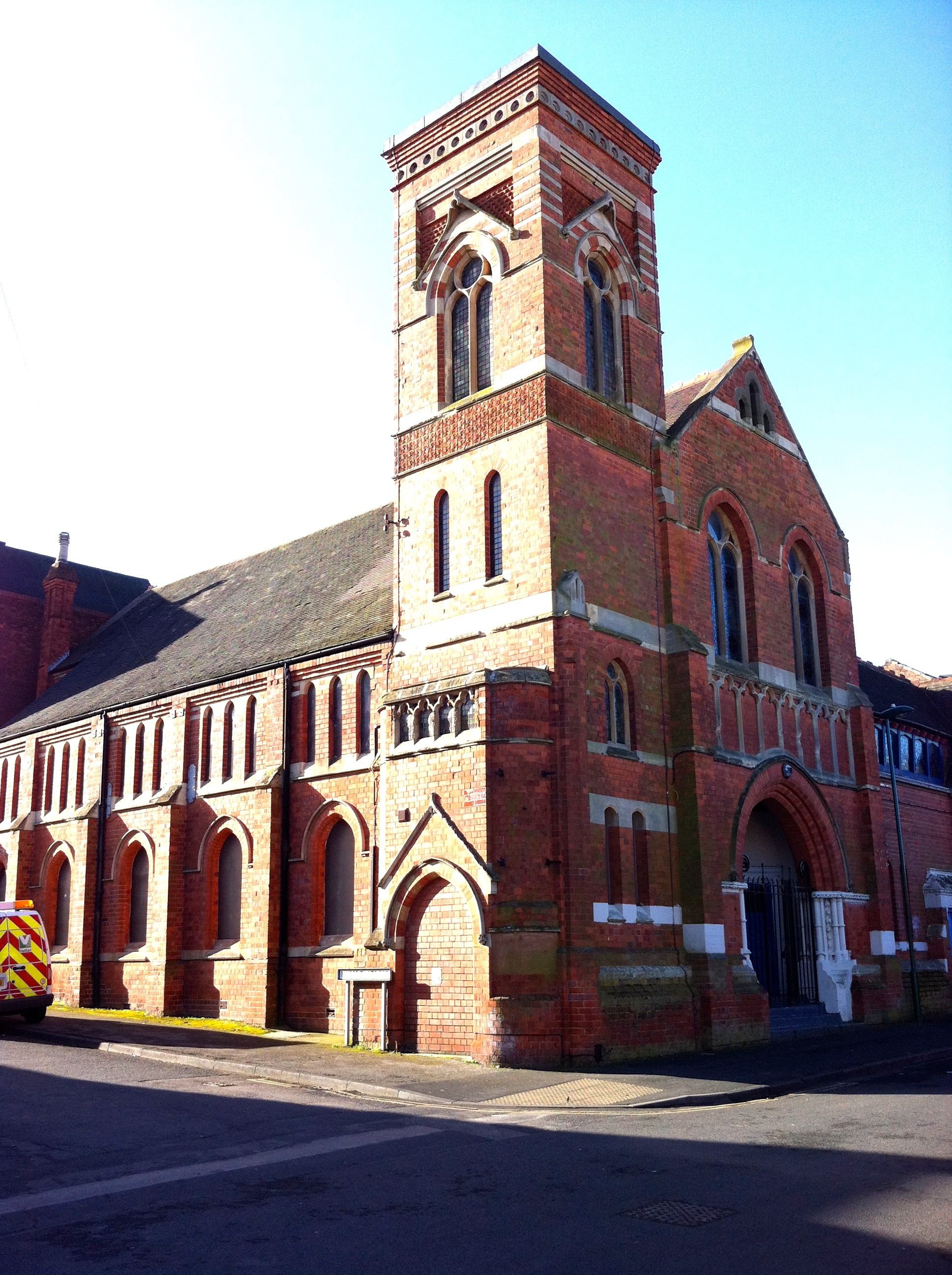
- Hyson Green Baptist Church
- Hyson Green Baptist Church
- 52.9633°N 1.1702°W
- Location: Hyson Green Nottingham
- Country: England
- Denomination: Baptist

Architecture
- Architect: John Wallis Chapman
- Style: Gothic revival architecture
- Completed: 1883
- Closed: 1983

Hyson Green Baptist Church is on Palin Street in Hyson Green, Nottingham. It is a Grade II listed building.

== History ==
The church was founded in 1825, as an overflow of the Stoney Street Baptist Church. The building on Palin Street was designed by John Wallis Chapman. It was constructed by J R Morrison of Hyson Green. Foundation stones were laid on 21 June 1883

The Baptist congregation was based here until 1983, when a move was made to better premises in Raleigh Street, near Canning Circus. In 2012 they moved into a larger church Cornerstone Church (Nottingham) on Castle Boulevard.

The Palin Street building is now used by the Assemblies of the First Born.

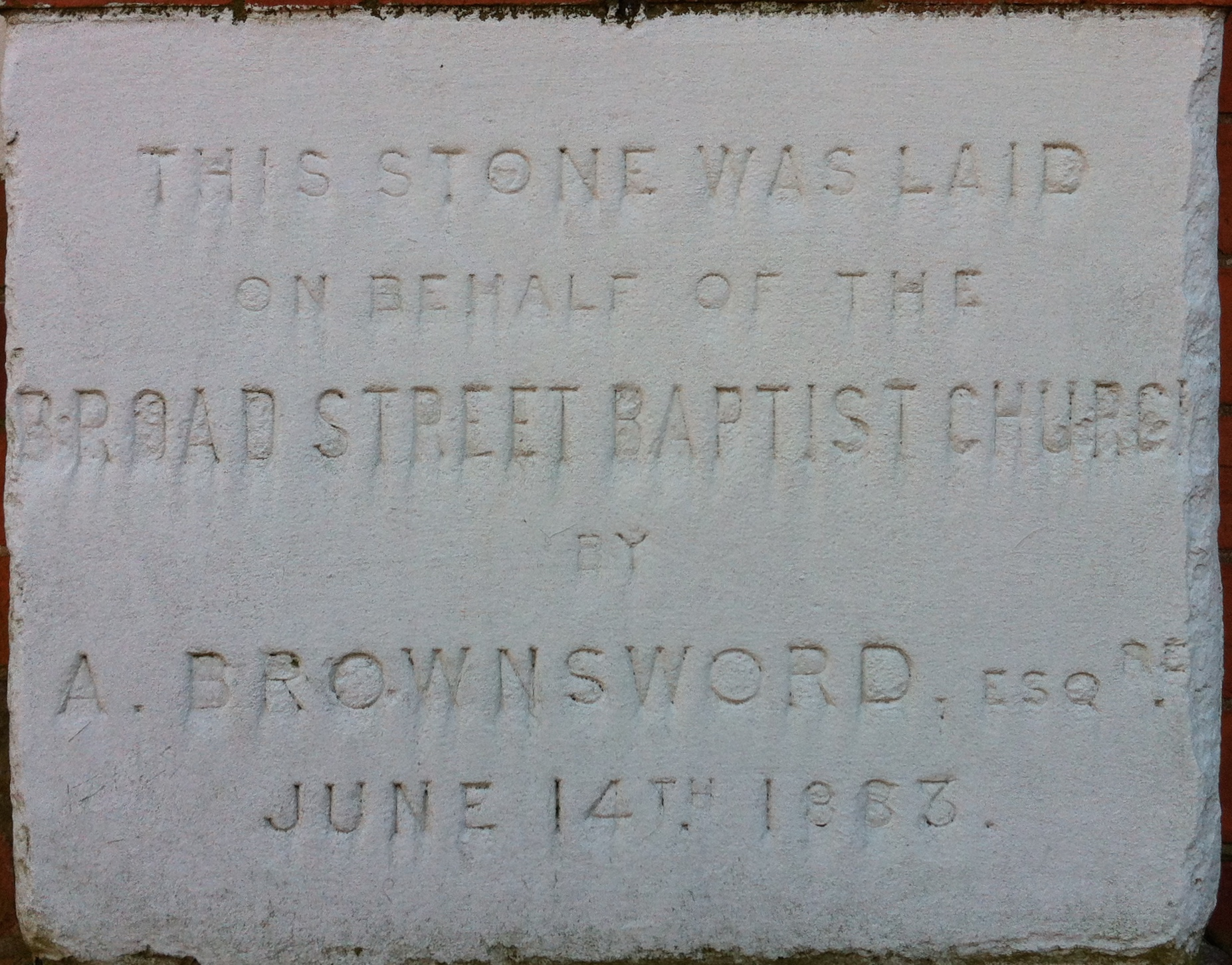
Foundation stone laid by Broad Street Baptist Church

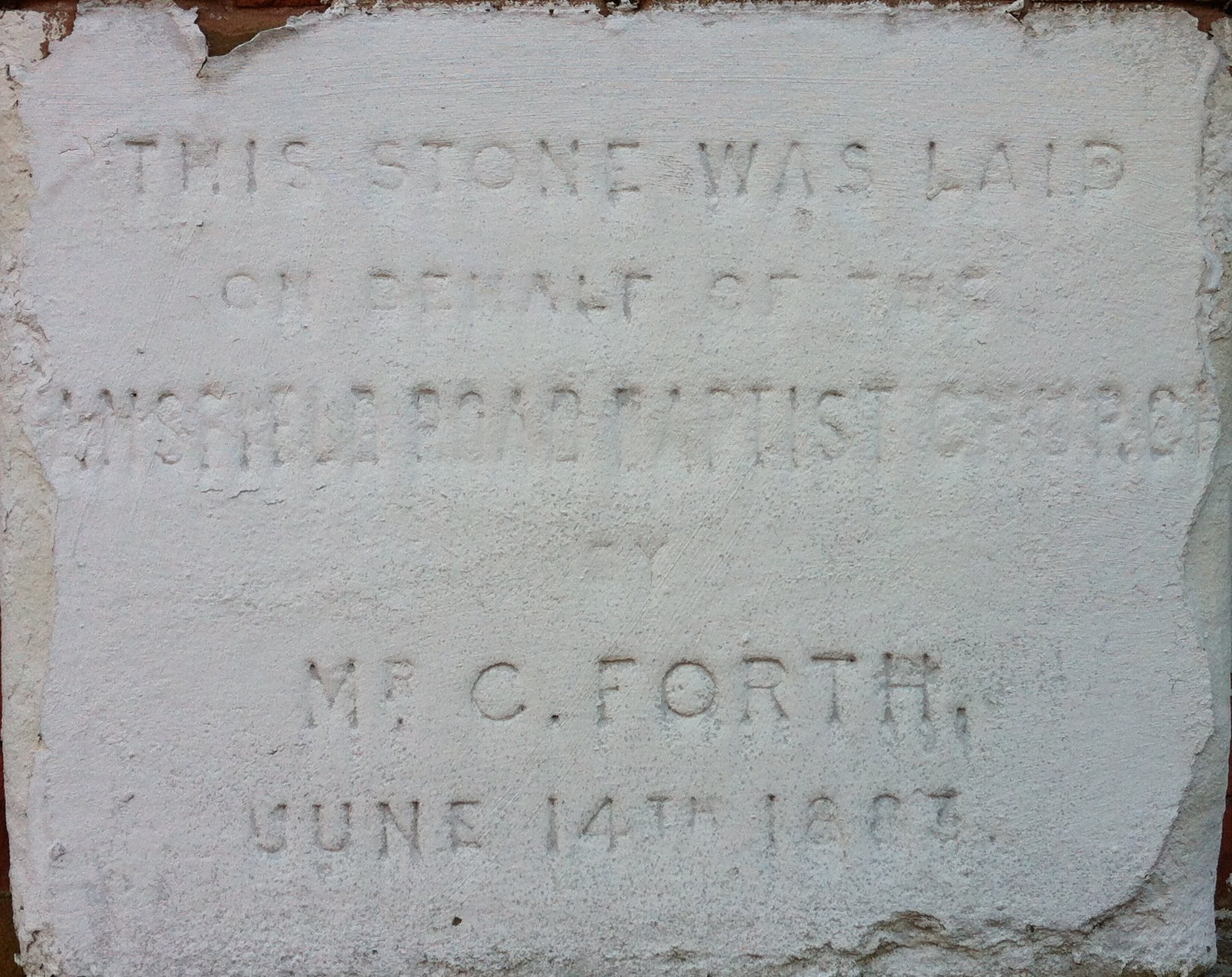
Foundation stone laid by Mansfield Road Baptist Church
