= William Herbert Higginbottom =

Architect from Nottingham, England

William Herbert Higginbottom JP (23 March 1868 – 6 December 1929) was an architect based in Nottingham.

== Life ==
He was born on 23 March 1868 in Leeds to Anthony Higginbottom (1842–1895) and Elizabeth Ackroyd (1844–1913). When he was one year of age, his family moved to Arnold, Nottingham, where his father became the headmaster of the British School.

He married Elizabeth Spencer (1869–1924) on 25 January 1897 at Redcliffe Road Methodist Chapel, Nottingham, and they had the following children:

- Hilda Margaret Higginbottom (1899–1973)
- William Herbert Higginbottom (1899–1899)
- (Anthony) John Higginbottom (1902–1972) LRIBA also an architect
- Elizabeth May Higginbottom (1904–1904)
- Elizabeth Higginbottom (1906–1972)

He died on 6 December 1929 and left an estate valued at £2882 16s 2d. (equivalent to £221,300 in 2023).

== Career ==
He attended the Nottingham School of Art.

For a time he worked from King John's Chambers in Nottingham. In 1905 he moved to an office at 16 George Street, Nottingham but in 1906 he moved to 2 Friar Yard, Friar Lane, Nottingham. along with Hedley John Price.

After qualifying as an architect Higginbottom designed many of the important buildings in Arnold.

He was a local councillor on Arnold Urban District Council and chairman from 1911 to 1913. He was a member of Nottinghamshire County Council, for the Bestwood Park Division, where he worked on the old age pension and highways committees.

== Buildings ==
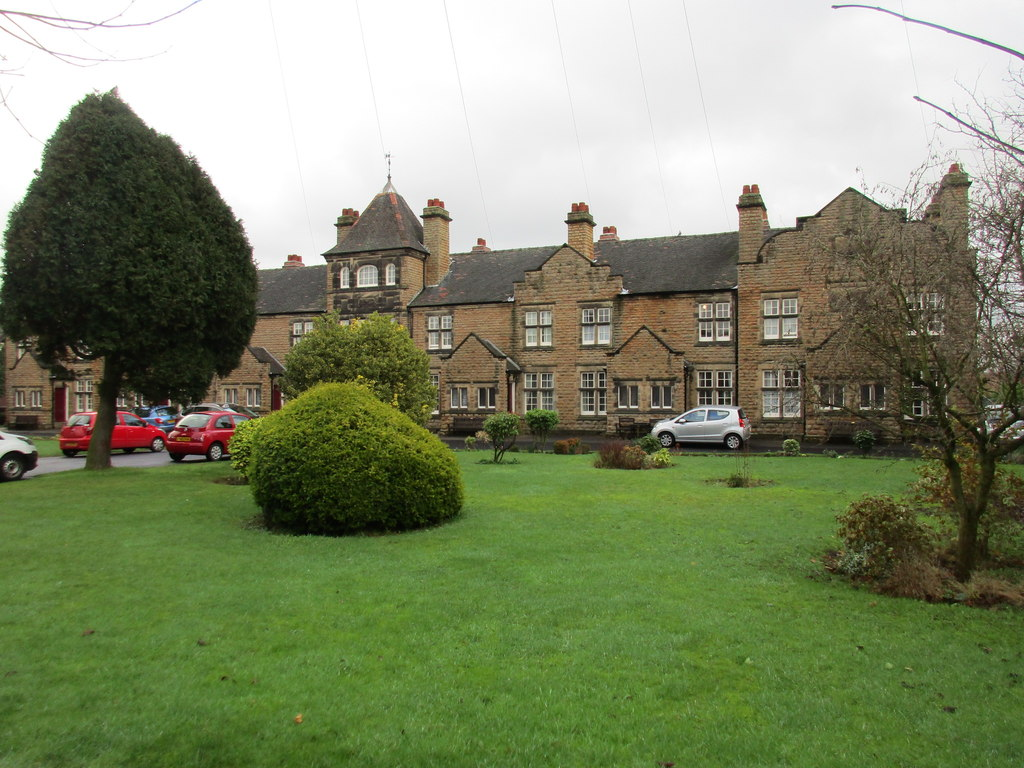
Sir John Robinson's Almshouses

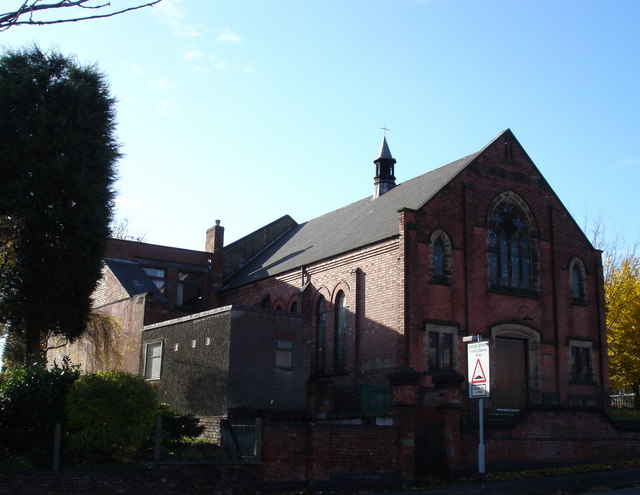
Cross Street Baptist Church, Arnold

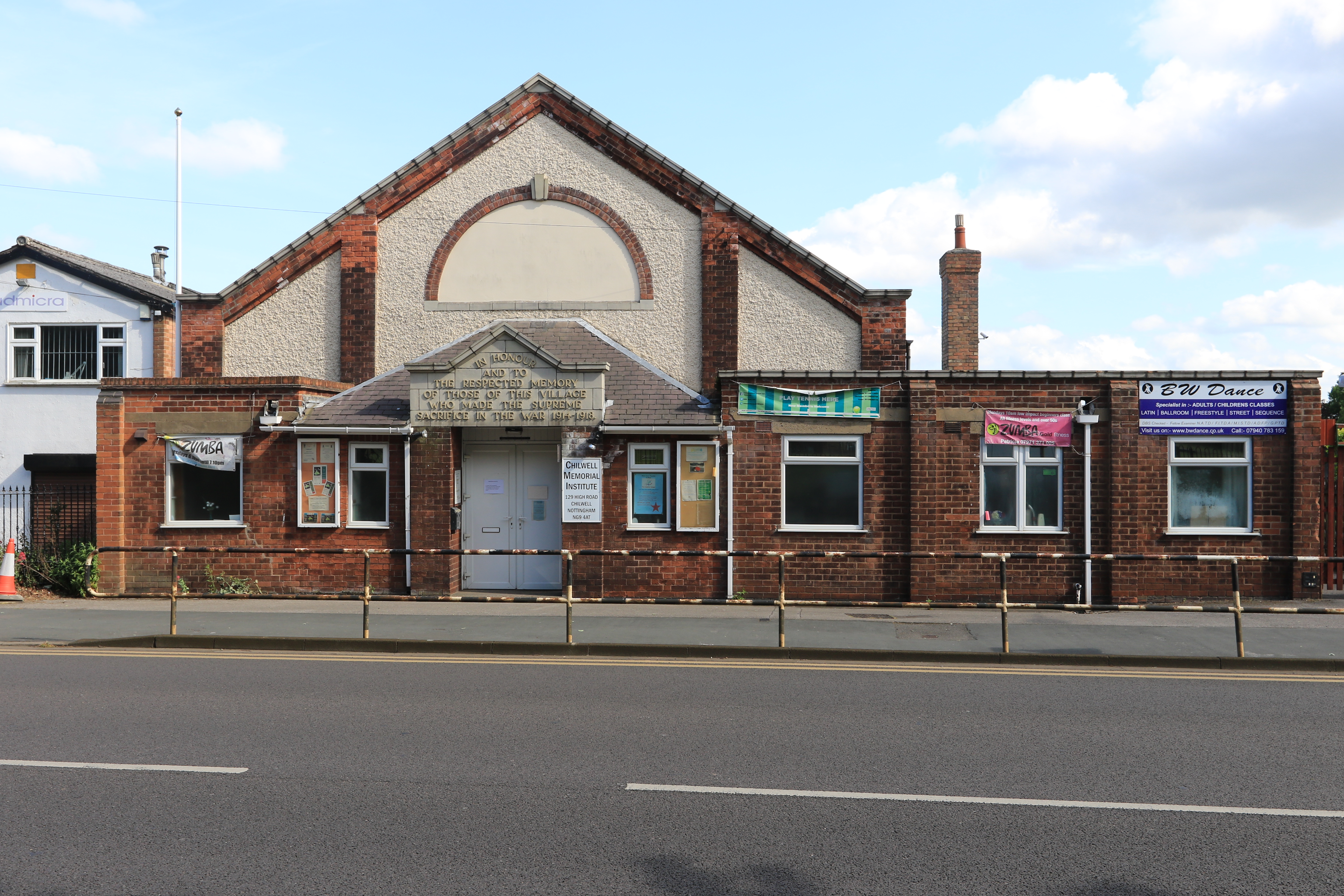
Chilwell Memorial Institute 1924

- St Matthias' Day Schools, Carlton Road, Sneinton, Nottingham 1895 (enlargement)
- Stapleford Schools 1896
- Sir John Robinson’s Almshouses, Daybrook 1899
- Wesleyan Chapel, Arnold 1900
- Carlton Methodist Church, 1903
- Five semi-detached houses, 44-62 Meadow Road, Beeston
- United Methodist Church, Sneinton Boulevard, Sneinton 1904-05
- The Carnegie Library, Arnold 1906
- Calverton Methodist Church, 1907
- Cross Street Baptist Church 1909
- St Albans Picturedrome, Arnold 1912 (with George Francis Grimwood)
- Daybrook Baptist Church, 1912
- Ruddington Village Hall 1912-13
- Victoria Picture Palace, 49 Station Road, Carlton 1912-13
- Empress Cinema, Arnold 1913
- Mission Church at Daybrook
- War Memorial Cross, Beeston 1921
- War Memorial in Arnot Hill Park, Arnold 1922
- Chilwell Memorial Institute 1924
- Park House Carlton
- Warehouses on Plumptre Street, Nottingham
- Sunday School, Ebenezer United Methodist Chapel, Arnold 1929
