= Listed buildings in Gedling (unparished areas) =

Gedling is a local government district with borough status in Nottinghamshire. This list contains the 34 listed buildings that are recorded in the National Heritage List for England in the parts of the borough that are unparished. Of these, one is listed at Grade I, the highest of the three grades, three are at Grade II*, the middle grade, and the others are at Grade II, the lowest grade. The list includes communities in Arnold, Carlton, Daybrook and Redhill. Most of the listed buildings are houses, cottages, and associated structures, farmhouses and farm buildings. The others include churches and associated structures, buildings associated with the framework-knitting and hosiery industry, almshouses, war memorials, shops and a former public house.

== Key ==
Grade	Criteria
I	Buildings of exceptional interest, sometimes considered to be internationally important
II*	Particularly important buildings of more than special interest
II	Buildings of national importance and special interest

== Buildings ==
Name and location	Photograph	Date	Notes	Grade
St Mary's Church, Arnold; 53.00946°N 1.12691°W		12th century	The church has been altered and extended though the centuries, and it was restored in 1866–68. It is built in stone with slate roofs, and consists of a nave with a clerestory, north and south aisles, a south porch, a chancel with a vestry and an organ chamber, and a west tower. The tower has two stages, a moulded plinth, corner buttresses, a string course, an eaves band, and a plain parapet with corner pinnacles. On the west side is a doorway with a moulded surround, clustered shafts and a hood mould, above which is a triple lancet window with a hood mould. The upper stage contains a 13th-century carved panel, clock faces, and two-light bell openings. The nave has an embattled parapet.	II*
All Hallows Church, Gedling; 52.97699°N 1.08050°W		13th century	The church has been altered and extended through the centuries, it was restored in 1872, and the roof was restored in 1892 by Arthur Blomfield. The church is built in stone with roofs of slate and tile, and it consists of a nave with a clerestory, north and south aisles, a south porch, a chancel with a vestry and an organ chamber, and a west steeple. The steeple has a tower with three stages, corner buttresses, two string courses, a corbel table, and an embattled parapet. It is surmounted by a tall, thin broach spire with a slight entasis. This has two tiers of lucarnes, the lower tier with gables and niches containing figures. The upper lucarnes are smaller, and at the top is a weathercock. The nave and aisles also have embattled parapets, the latter also with gargoyles.	I
Font, All Hallows Church, Gedling; 52.97693°N 1.08074°W		14th century	The font is in the churchyard of All Hallows Church, to the south of the church. It is in stone and consists of an octagonal stem with a simple capital, on which is an octagonal bowl.	II
24 Shearing Hill, Gedling, and stable 52.97429°N 1.07475°W		Early 18th century	A house and stable, the stable later incorporated into the house, in brick, with dentilled eaves, and a pantile roof with coped gables. There are two storeys and an L-shaped plan, with a front range of five bays, a lower two-storey single-bay wing on the left, and two rear extensions. The doorway has a semicircular fanlight and is flanked by horizontally-sliding sash windows, and the other windows are casements. The ground floor windows have segmental heads.	II
Bonington House; 53.00445°N 1.12935°W		Early 18th century	The house, the birthplace of the painter Richard Parkes Bonington, and later used for other purposes, is in brick on a chamfered plinth, with stone dressings, rusticated quoins, dentilled eaves, a cornice, and a tile roof with coped gables. There are three storeys and four bays, and a later single-storey extension on the left. The doorway has a fanlight and a bargeboarded hood on brackets, and the windows are sashes with splayed wavy lintels and keystones. On the ground floor is a memorial plaque in concrete and bronze.	II
Cockliffe House and granary 53.04706°N 1.13278°W	—	Early 18th century	A farmhouse and granary later combined into a house, it is in stone, with quoins, architraves and slate roofs. There are two storeys and an L-shaped plan, with a front of four bays. The east front has a half-round hipped bay window at each end, and between is a French window. Most of the windows are sashes, and there are also Gothick-style casements. On the left side is a two-storey stable range, and further to the left is the former granary with two coped gables.	II
11 and 15 Wood Lane, Gedling; 52.97624°N 1.07349°W	—	Early 18th century	A pair of brick houses on a stone plinth, with floor bands and a hipped tile roof. On the front are two doorways with segmental heads, most of the windows are horizontally-sliding sashes with segmental heads, and the others are casements.	II
Arnold House; 53.00747°N 1.12786°W	—	Early 18th century	A brick house on a plinth, with stone dressings, a sill band, moulded eaves, and a hipped slate roof. There are two storeys and three bays. In the centre is a doorway with a reeded surround, a fanlight, and an open dentilled pediment on scrolled brackets. The windows are sashes, those flanking the doorway are tripartite with cornices, the window above the doorway has a round head and a keystone, and there are two flat-roofed dormers.	II
Manor Farmhouse; 52.97879°N 1.08361°W		Mid 18th century	A farmhouse, stable and wash house combined into a house, it is in brick with hipped slate roofs. The house has a three-storey central section, bowed to the north, and flanking two-storey wings. On the south side is a porch with a pantile roof. The windows are a mix of horizontally-sliding sashes and casements.	II
Gedling House; 52.97791°N 1.06532°W		Late 18th century (probable)	A large house, later used for other purposes, in stuccoed brick on a stone plinth, with a floor band, modillion eaves, balustrades, parapets and a hipped slate roof. There are three storeys and seven bays forming a bowed projection to the south, and the windows are sashes. To the west is a two-storey two-bay extension with casement windows and a bay window. The doorway in the centre of the north front has Doric columns, a fanlight, and pediment. To the east, a wall links the house to a coach house with a pyramidal roof, beyond which is a two-storey service wing.	II
Ramsdale House and stable 53.03641°N 1.12172°W		Late 18th century	The farmhouse is in rendered brick and stone on a stone plinth, and has a roof of tile and pantile. It is in two and three storeys, with an L-shaped plan, the main range with three bays. In the centre of the south front is a Doric portico, and a doorway with a moulded surround and a fanlight. The windows are a mix of casements, some with mullions, and sashes, some horizontally-sliding. The adjoining stable has a slate roof and nine bays.	II
321 Mansfield Road and frameshop 53.01121°N 1.13489°W		c. 1800	The house and attached frameshop, which was added in 1830, are in brick with slate and tile roofs. The house has two storeys and three bays. In the centre is a doorway with a fanlight, and the windows are sashes, the openings in the lower floor with wedge lintels and keystones. The former frameshop is at right angles to the rear, and has two storeys and three bays. In the centre is a gabled porch and a doorway with a fanlight, and the windows are casements.	II
42A Calverton Road; 53.01215°N 1.12187°W	—	Early 19th century	A knitters' cottage, later a private house, in brick on a rendered plinth, with a pantile roof. There are two storeys and two bays. To the left is a doorway, in the right bay is a knitters' window with a segmental head, and the other windows are large casements.	II
Knitters' workshops, Burton Road; 52.96819°N 1.08341°W	—	c. 1830	The former workshops are in brick with pantile roofs. There is a single range of three storeys and seven bays. On the front are two doorways, and the windows are casements, those in the left four bays in the lower two floors with segmental heads.	II
34 High Street, Arnold; 53.00336°N 1.12912°W		c. 1840	The house is in brick, partly on a rendered plinth, with a slate roof. There are two storeys, and an L-shaped plan, with a front of three bays, and a rear addition with a catslide roof. In the centre is a doorway with a fanlight, flanked by sash windows, all with segmental heads, and in the upper floor are casement windows.	II
Wall, St Mary's Church, Arnold; 53.00918°N 1.12700°W	—	1841	The boundary wall on the west side of the churchyard is in stone with ramped shaped coping. It extends for about 120 metres (390 ft), and contains a datestone.	II
86 and 88 Main Road, Gedling; 52.97525°N 1.07776°W		Mid 19th century	A pair of brick cottages with slate roofs, two storeys and six bays. The doors have timber hoods on shaped brackets, and most of the windows are horizontally-sliding sashes; all the openings have segmental heads.	II
Former hosiery factory 52.99707°N 1.13704°W		c. 1860	Further ranges were added in 1885 and 1901 around a courtyard. The earlier ranges are in red brick with stone dressings and slate roofs. The earliest range has two storeys and eight bays, and the 1885 range has three storeys and a basement, and sides of eleven and four bays. The latest range is steel framed with cladding in red brick and concrete dressings. It has three storeys and a basement, and sides of 13 and five bays.	II
Arnot Hill House; 52.99701°N 1.13222°W		1866	A house, later used for other purposes, in stone partly rendered, on a chamfered plinth, with quoins, a floor band, elaborate bracketed eaves and slate roofs. There are two storeys and five bays, and the windows are sashes. In the south front is a canted two-storey tower porch containing a round-headed doorway with a keystone. The west front has a central round bay window, and each outer bay contains a canted bay window.	II
Hand-frame shop 53.00258°N 1.11922°W	—	c. 1870	Two hand-frame knitting sheds, the second added in about 1880. They are in red brick with stone dressings, and Welsh slate roofs with terracotta ridge tiles and finials. There are two storeys, the main block has 15 bays, and a further block to the right has six bays. In the centre is a two-storey staircase projection, and the windows are casements.	II
St Paul's Church, Carlton-in-the-Willows; 52.96585°N 1.09036°W		1884	The church was completed in 1890–91. It is in Romanesque style, and built in red brick, with dressings in stone and yellow terracotta, and slate roofs. It consists of a nave with a clerestory, north and south aisles, north and south porches, an apsidal baptistry, and a chancel with an organ chamber, a vestry and an apsidal sanctuary.	II
Terrace and walls, St Paul's Church, Carlton-in-the-Willows; 52.96600°N 1.09066°W	—	1885	The terrace and boundary walls are in stone and form an L-shaped plan, with sides of about 120 metres (390 ft) by 50 metres (160 ft). The terrace wall contains steps with ramped balustrades, the boundary wall is coped, and both contain square piers.	II
St Paul's Church, Daybrook; 53.00069°N 1.13779°W		1892–96	The church was designed by J. Loughborough Pearson, and the steeple was added in 1896–97. It is built in polychromatic orange-brown and grey stone with tile roofs, and consists of a nave with a clerestory, north and south aisles, a north porch, a north transept, a chancel with chapels and vestries, and an almost detached southwest steeple. The steeple has a tower with three stages, buttresses, and a canted stair turret on the northwest. In the bottom stage is a traceried panel containing a doorway with a moulded surround and a crocketed finial, and lancet windows. The middle stage contains recessed panels with corbel tables and round windows, and on the west front is an ornate bracketed clock, and the top stage contains lancets with crocketed gables, pilasters and a gabled niche containing a figure. The tower is surmounted by an octagonal broach spire with spired pinnacles, gabled lucarnes with double lancets, and a cross finial.	II*
Carlton Laundry; 52.96582°N 1.08405°W		1899	The former laundry was designed by Watson Fothergill, and is in red brick with some blue brick and applied timber framing, and has a hipped tile roof. The building is on a blue brick plinth, and has floor bands. There are two storeys and attics, and seven bays. Most of the windows are casements with round or segmental heads, and there are hipped dormers. On the north front is a half-round stair turret with a conical roof and a wind vane, and in the west gable end is a round-headed doorway.	II
Daybrook Almshouses; 53.00023°N 1.13738°W		1899	The almshouses are in stone on a chamfered plinth, with tile roofs, and are in a single range with two storeys and a symmetrical front of seven bays. There are four shaped, shouldered and coped gables, the outer ones taller and wider, and containing blank panels. The windows are casements, either mullioned or cross windows. In the centre is a three-storey gatehouse with a pyramidal roof and a wind vane, containing a round-arched carriage entrance and a datestone. In the ground floor are six gabled porches with side doors.	II
Gateway and wall, Daybrook Almshouses; 53.00017°N 1.13795°W		1899	The gateway and wall are in stone. The gateway has a round arch flanked by piers with square domed capitals and finials. Above it is an inscribed frieze and a pediment. There are central double gates and outer wicket gates in iron. The boundary walls have chamfered coping and spiked iron railings, and contain six square piers with stepped square domed caps. They form a C-shaped plan, with sides of about 100 metres (330 ft) and 50 metres (160 ft).	II
The Dairy, Dairy Farm; 53.04604°N 1.14332°W	—	c. 1900	The dairy is in red brick with applied timber framing and pebbledash infill, and has a copper hipped roof. There is a hexagonal plan, a single storey, and it is linked to the farmhouse by a corridor, each of the other faces containing a casement window. The roof has two pitches, and three roof lights surmounted by a hexagonal wooden cupola with a small copper dome.	II
Boer War Memorial; 52.96773°N 1.08714°W	—	1902	The war memorial was moved to its present site in 2002, and commemorates those who were lost in the Boer War. It consists of a sandstone urn carved in relief with goats’ heads and grapes. The urn stands on a square pedestal with a splayed base, and on it is an inscription and the names of those lost.	II
Arnold War Memorial; 52.99717°N 1.13317°W		1922	The war memorial in Arnot Hill Park is in Aberdeen granite. It consists of a Celtic wheel cross on a tapering trapezoid plinth on a two-stepped base. On the front of the cross is intricate carving. There are inscriptions on the front face of the shaft and of the plinth, and on the sides of the plinth are the names of those lost in the two World Wars and later conflicts. The memorial is in a square enclosure with blue brick dwarf walls and decorative iron railings.	II
Home Ales Brewery Offices and railing 52.99889°N 1.13750°W		1936	The office building was designed by T. Cecil Howitt, it is steel framed, and clad in pale brick with stone dressings. In the centre is a large tower containing a square-headed lorry entrance surrounded by stone, and containing ornate iron gates, above which is a Diocletian window and a clock, flanked by tall pilasters. The tower is flanked by flat-roofed wings, each with twelve bays, two storeys and a basement, containing tall windows with brick piers between, above which is a recessed attic storey clad in stone. Between the floors is a frieze with carvings by Charles Doman. In front of the building is a low brick wall with a stone parapet, iron railings and piers.	II
Mary Hardstaff Homes; 52.97966°N 1.08450°W		1936	A group of houses of different sizes for miners, arranged as an arc, and designed by T. Cecil Howitt. They are in brown and orange brick, on plinths, with hipped tile roofs. They are in one and two storeys. In the central block is a recessed passage doorway containing an iron gate, with a Dutch gabled hood and an inscribed cartouche. In the centre of the two outer wings are wide Dutch gables, each with a five-light window, over which is a three-light window with an embossed window box. All the windows are casements.	II
Coronation Buildings; 52.99846°N 1.13808°W		1937	A row of seven shops in yellowish brick at the front and red brick at the rear, with a hipped Cumberland slate roof. There are two storeys and eleven bays, the middle five bays projecting. In the ground floor are shop fronts, over which is a continuous projecting canopy. The upper floor contains casement windows, and above the central tripartite window, which has fluted pilasters and rusticated edges, is a semicircular pediment containing lettering and the date.	II
The former Oxclose Public House; 52.99703°N 1.15219°W		1939	The former public house was designed by T. Cecil Howitt. It is in rendered and painted brick, on a chamfered plinth, with dressings in reconstituted stone, and a roof of Westmorland slate. There is a single storey and attics. On the front is an off-centre gable containing a large canted bay window, and three doorways with moulded surrounds. The windows are mullioned or mullioned and transomed, and there is a raking dormer.	II
Church of the Good Shepherd, Nottingham; 52.99315°N 1.13637°W		1963–66	The church was designed by Gerard Goalen, with stained glass by Patrick Reyntiens. The main space is an elongated hexagon, over which rise concrete panels with inset dalle de verre stained glass to form segmental-headed arches. Around the hexagon is a rectangular enclosure containing a Lady chapel, a baptistry, a choir, vestries and a narthex. The walls below the panels are in brick. To the left of the entrance is a concrete needle spire containing a cage-like louvred bell chamber.	II*
