= Derby Road (disambiguation) =

Derby Road railway station is located in Ipswich, Suffolk, England.

Derby Road may also refer to:

- Derby Road Baptist Church in Nottingham, Nottinghamshire, England
- Derby Road Ground, a cricket ground in Wirksworth, Derbyshire, England
- Loughborough Derby Road railway station in Loughborough, Leicestershire, England
