= Cornerstone Church (Nottingham) =

Cornerstone Church, Nottingham
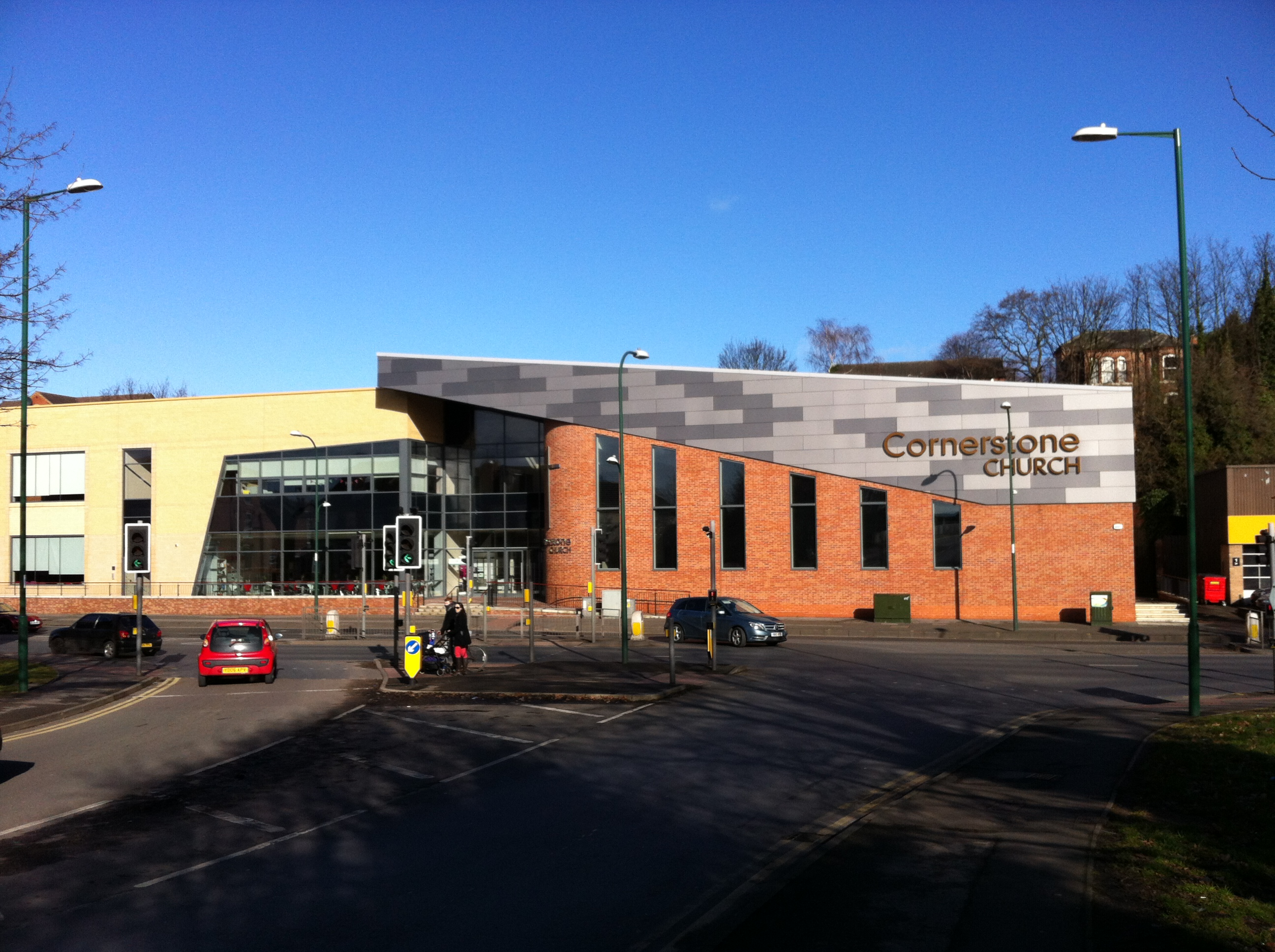
- Cornerstone Church, Nottingham
- 52°56′47.24″N 1°10′3.97″W
- Location: Nottingham
- Country: England
- Denomination: Evangelical
- Previous denomination: The Evangelical Alliance Midlands Gospel Partnership
- Website: www.cornerstonechurch.org.uk

History
- Dedicated: 2012

Architecture
- Groundbreaking: 2011
- Completed: 2012

Cornerstone Church, is an independent evangelical church in Nottingham, England.

== History ==
The church was founded in 1825, as an overflow of the Stoney Street Baptist Church from Nottingham city centre. From a Hyson Green Baptist Church, the congregation moved in 1983 to Raleigh Street in Radford.

In 2012 the congregation moved to a new church building on Castle Boulevard in Nottingham. Erected at a cost of £3.5m, the construction was funded by the 750 strong congregation.
