= St Mary's Church, Arnold =

Coordinates: 53°00′33″N 01°07′37″W

St. Mary’s Church, Arnold
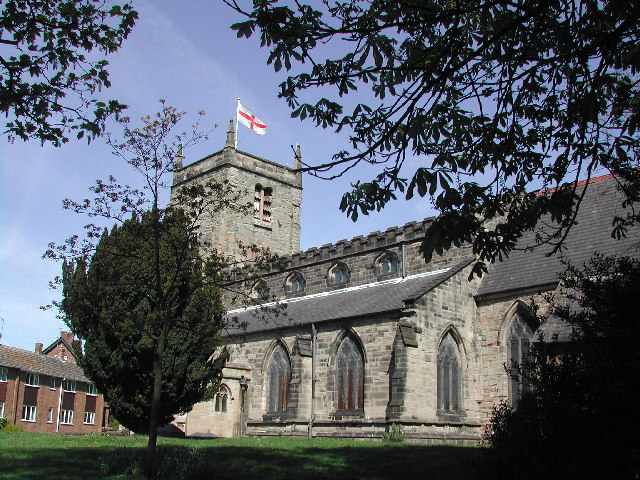
- St. Mary’s Church, Arnold
- Denomination: Church of England
- Churchmanship: Broad Church
- Website: www.stmarysarnold.org.uk

History
- Dedication: St. Mary

Administration
- Province: York
- Diocese: Southwell and Nottingham
- Parish: Arnold, Nottinghamshire

Clergy
- Vicar: Craig Hunt

St. Mary's Church is a parish church in Arnold, Nottinghamshire, England. Though there is no official founding date, it is estimated that the church dates back to 1176 and written records commenced in 1544.

The church underwent Victorian restoration by Sir George Gilbert Scott between 1868–69, which included rebuilding the tower base, removing galleries, and inserting a new east window at a cost of around £4,000

The church is Grade II* listed by the Department for Digital, Culture, Media and Sport as a result of receiving significant attention from tourists.

== History ==
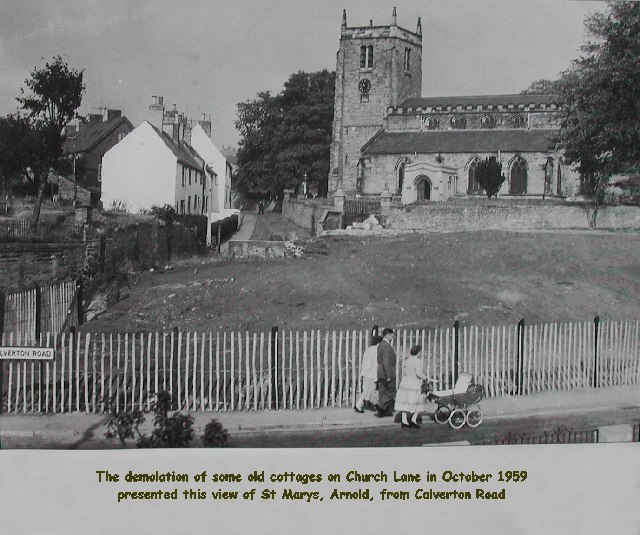
St. Mary's Church in October 1959

The church is medieval dating back to 1176. It was however part of the Victorian restoration from 1868 to 1869 by Scott. There was further restoration in 1877 under the direction of Richard Charles Sutton. The structure or property is also “listed under the Planning (Listed Buildings and Conservation Areas) Act 1990 as amended for its special architectural or historic interest.” St. Mary's Church “may lie within the boundary of more than one authority,” which further supports its historic significance, based in the fact that certain records and so much interest has kept the Church intact, well visited, restored, and written or recorded about; known authorities include, but are not limited to, Nottinghamshire County and Gedling District. The church contains the remains of an Easter Sepulchre.

== Bells ==
There are eight bells in the Tower, the largest of which is the Tenor weighing over 8 cwt. The Tenor is also the newest bell, cast by Taylors Eayre & Smith Ltd on 20 April 2006 and installed by Pembleton's on 28 April 2007. The Tenor was dedicated by the Rt. Rev. Tony Porter, Bishop of Sherwood, on 3 June 2007.

== Churchyard graves and memorials ==
The oldest decipherable and dated inscription in the churchyard can be found on a small stone ten yards south of the church and close to the tomb of the Stanfields. It reads, "1690, Near this place lyeth ye Body of John, Son of Sam Leadbeater by Mary his Wife, who departed this life Novm. ye 14th. Rebecca Elley was one of the benefactors of the Free School; she died 27 December 1785, aged 70." The burial ground of the Acton family, ancestors and relatives of Mr. James Acton, of Goodwood House, was a carefully kept plot just inside the gate of the north Churchyard. Thomas Sheldon, died 1875, aged 80; he fought at Waterloo.

Mr. John Atherley was the last of the musicians who played instruments in the old gallery of Arnold Church. He was interred 29 April 1915, aged 75.

The Churchyard was enlarged around 1851. At the consecration, a young man named John Toplis was present; and when the ceremony was over he said, “I wonder what poor devil will be buried there first”. Soon after reaching home, he became afflicted with smallpox and died after three days.

== See also ==
- Grade II* listed buildings in Nottinghamshire
- Listed buildings in Gedling (unparished areas)
