= John Thomas Emmett =

English architect (1823–1898)

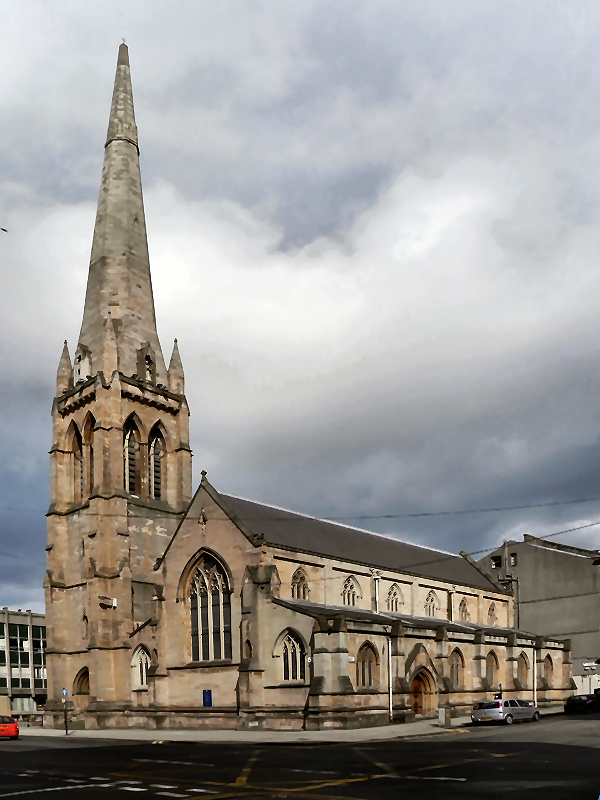
St Stephen's Church, Renfield, Glasgow 1849-1852

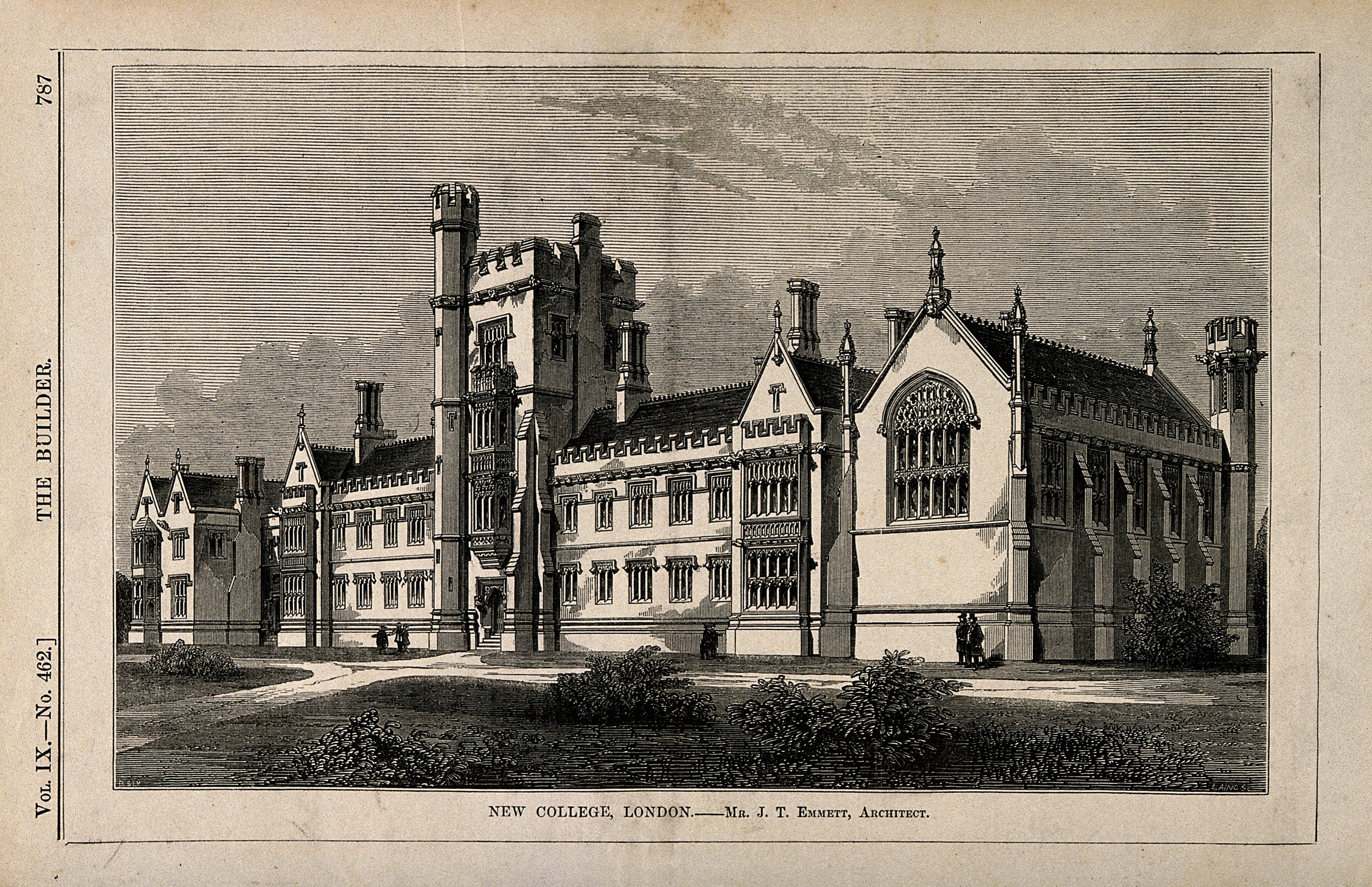
New College, St John's Wood, London. Wood engraving by Charles David Laing after B. Sly, 1851

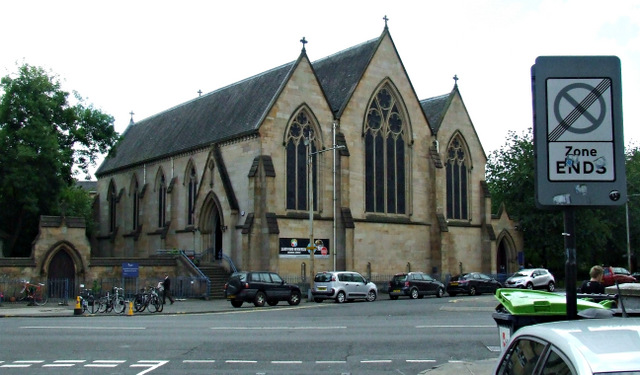
Sandyford Henderson Memorial Church 1856

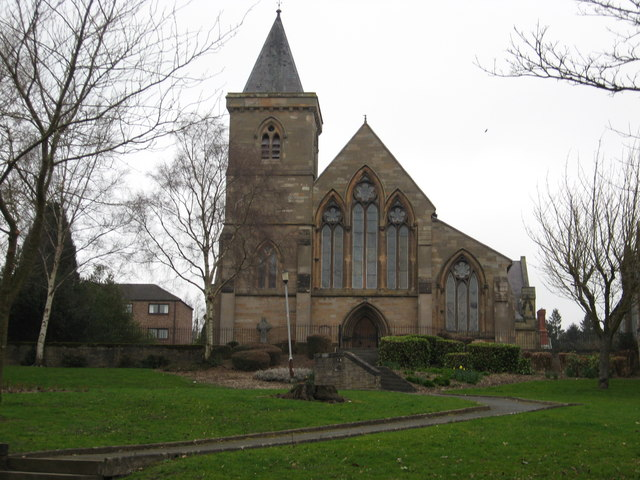
Wilton Parish Church 1860 - 1862

John Thomas Emmett (18 August 1823 – 3 August 1898) was an English architect and designer based in London.

== Life ==
He was born on 18 August 1823, the son of John Emmett and Mary Saunders.

By 1846 he was working in practice at 11 Beaufort Buildings in London. By 1868 he was at 1 Cloudesley Square, Islington in London. In 1857 he was declared bankrupt., but by 1865 was a director of the North London, Highgate and Alexandra Park Railway.

He was a devotee of the Gothic style of architecture, and unafraid to criticise his colleagues building in more contemporary styles. In 1872 he published an anonymous article in the Quarterly Review on "The state of English architecture" which drew attacks from other architects.

== Works ==
- Padiham Baptist Church, Lancashire 1846. (closed 2013).
- Congregational Church, Camden Road, Holloway 1846
- Barnes railway station
- St Stephen’s Church, Bath Street, Renfield, Glasgow 1849 - 1852
- Derby Road Baptist Church Nottingham 1850 (demolished)
- New College of Independent Dissenters, Finchley Road, Hampstead 1851 (demolished 1934)
- Pastor William Black’s Monument, Glasgow Necropolis 1855
- Sandyford Henderson Memorial Church, Kelvinhaugh Street, Glasgow 1856 (with John Honeyman)
- Wilton Parish Church, Dickson Street, Hawick 1860 - 1862
