= Cloudesley Square =

Square in Islington, London, England

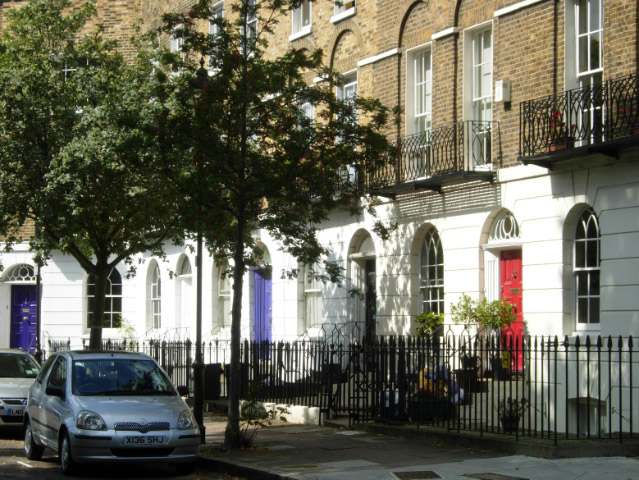
- Cloudesley Square

- Location within London Borough of Islington
- Postal code: N1
- Coordinates: 51.537403°N 0.108169°W

Construction
- Construction start: 1826
- Completion: 1829

Cloudesley Square is a square in the Barnsbury district of Islington, North London. It is bounded by Georgian terraced houses, all of which are listed buildings. The central area is occupied by the Gothic Revival former Holy Trinity Church, designed by Charles Barry.

== History ==
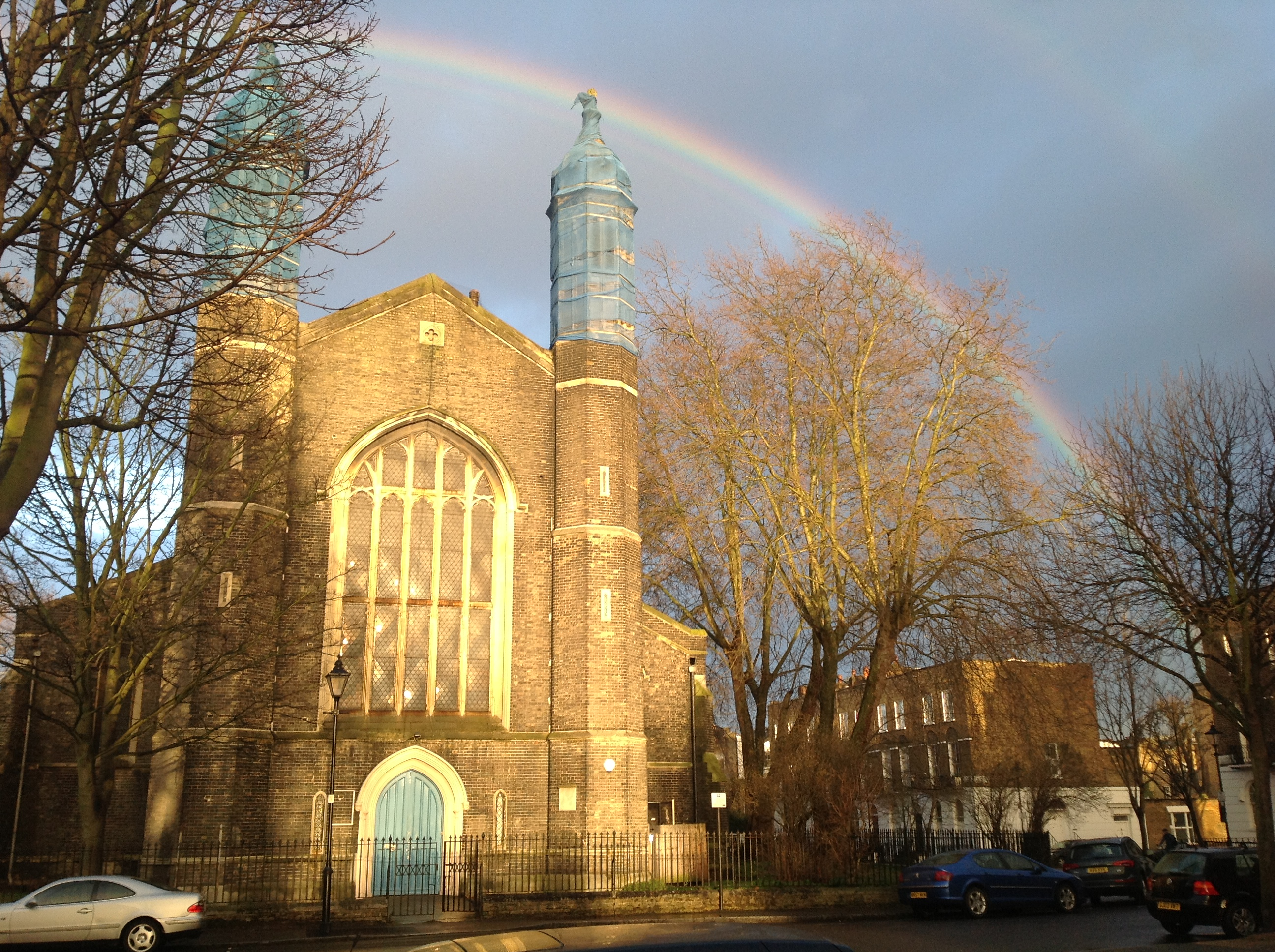
Holy Trinity Church in centre of Cloudesley Square

Richard Cloudesley, the owner of the Cloudesley estate in Barnsbury from the early 16th century, died in 1517. He seems to have feared posthumous difficulties, as contemporary sources at the time of his death describe him as being in a distressed state of mind, his body "restless, on the score of some sinne by him peradventure committed". A "wondrous commotion" and "tremblements de terre" in the earth near his burial place at St Mary's Church, Islington were ended only after an exorcism "at dede of night, nothing lothe, using divers divine exercises at torche light, set at rest the unrulie spirit of the sayde Cloudesley, and the earthe did returne aneare to its pristine shape". This was later related in an anonymous penny pamphlet of 1842 entitled The Islington Ghost!.

Cloudesley bequeathed 14 acres (5.7 ha) (Note: According to Ross, the area of the Stony Field was described in 1548 as 12 acres (4.9 ha), whereas Nelson records that it was surveyed as over 16 acres (6.5 ha).) of land called the “Stony Fields” to the parish of St Mary's, asking that yearly forever a solemn obit (a mass for the dead) should be said for the repose of his soul. He also bequeathed in his will an allowance of straw for the prisoners of Newgate, King's Bench, Marshalsea prisons and the mad inmates of Bedlam, grants valued at 6s 8d each year for the poor, gowns for the poor, road repairs, and a number of other bequests. These are still administered by the Cloudesley Charity.

The land survived the Reformation unconfiscated, and was used as meadow or pasture for the next three centuries, often for overnight grazing for cattle being herded to Smithfield Market. In 1809 the Corporation of London considered it as an alternative site for Smithfield, and the estate was valued then at nearly £23,000. The proposal did not proceed, and the market eventually removed to Copenhagen Fields in 1855.

By 1811, the land had become more valuable as a site for housing during the building boom which was starting in Islington, and a private Act of that year enabled the trustees to grant 99-year building leases. Topographer Samuel Lewis wrote in 1842 that “the greatest spur to building in the neighbourhood [was] given by the letting of the Stonefield estate on building leases in the year 1824” (although building actually started with Cloudesley Terrace on Liverpool Road in 1818). Subsequent construction on the long, narrow Stony Field site (also known as the Stonefield Estate or Cloudesley Estate) created Cloudesley Square, Cloudesley Road, Cloudesley Street, and Stonefield Street, with a mixture of third rate and fourth rate houses intended for single family occupation by middle class and professional residents, and tradesmen and skilled craftsmen. Cloudesley Square was the earliest Barnsbury square to be built, in 1826–29, on a building lease taken by Pentonville carpenter John Emmett, father of architect John Thomas Emmett.

Charles Booth’s poverty map of c.1890 shows Cloudesley Square households as "Fairly comfortable. Good ordinary earnings".

By 1895 the Cloudesley Charity's income from the estate consisted of ground rents from around 240 houses on leases which would fall in between 1899 and 1916. As with much of Islington at this time, houses built for single families became multi-occupation, with rooms rented cheaply. Barnsbury had become a crowded working-class neighbourhood. "The estate" it was said in 1937, "must now be considered as one which comprises tenement houses". Most of the estate consisting the ground rents of 71 houses and 2 shops was auctioned in 1937. Maintenance costs still exceeded rents, and in the 1970s the trustees sold off several long leaseholds, although by 1980 the Charity still owned property in Cloudesley Square, Cloudesley Road, and Cloudesley Street, including two blocks of mansion flats.

With the return of middle class and professional residents from the 1960s, many of the houses are now owner-occupied and house values have soared. The Cloudesley Charity still owns around 100 property units on the estate.

== Description ==
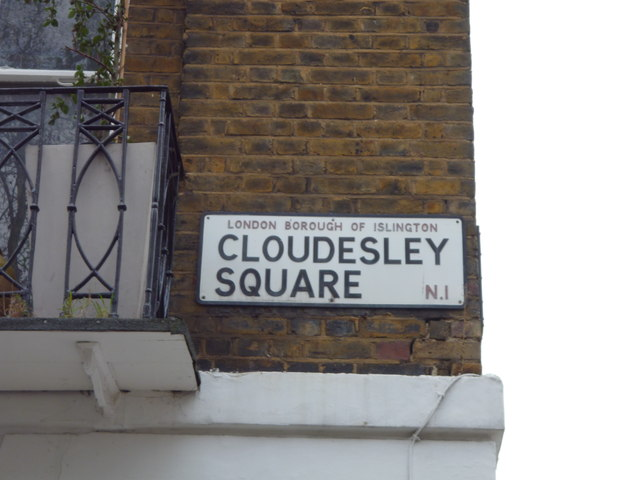
Cloudesley Square

The square forms an irregular hexagon, combining terraces with canted corners, and free-standing villas on the east side. Stables were planned for the villas on their north and south sides, but not built. The terraced houses have three floors and basements and balconies.

It is not clear if the original ground plan included a church in the square, but the central space is rather small and the original intention may have been to leave it as a private garden for residents.

South of the square on Cloudesley Street is a Gothic Revival former parish infant school, completed in 1830.

== Church of Holy Trinity ==
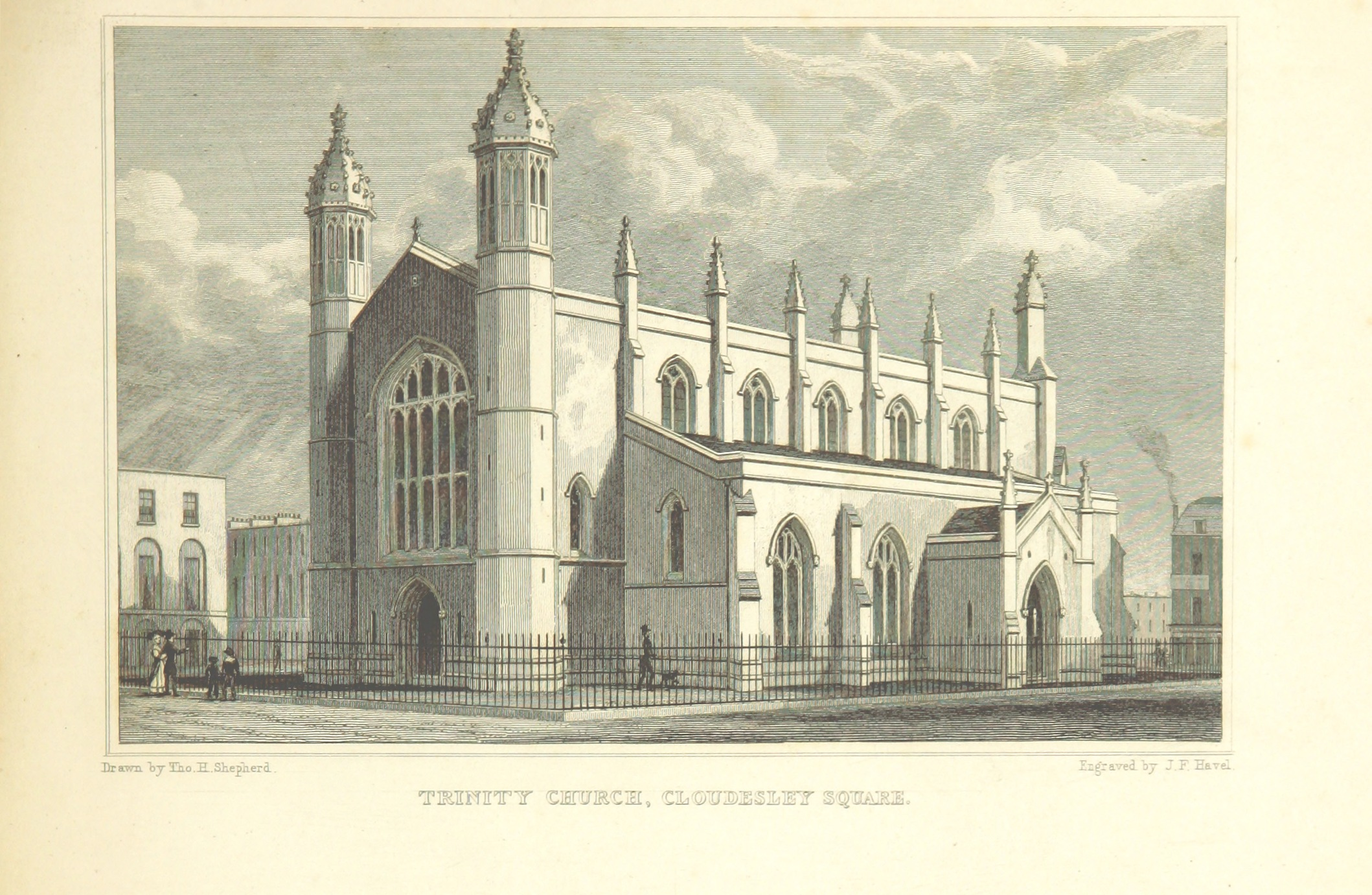
Holy Trinity Church

The centre of the square is occupied by Holy Trinity Church, which was designed by the young Charles Barry, best known for his role in the rebuilding of the Palace of Westminster (also known as the Houses of Parliament). The church is one of three in Islington designed by Barry, commissioned by the Church Building Commissioners, the others being St John's, Holloway, and St Paul's, Ball's Pond Road. It was designed in the newly fashionable Perpendicular style and recognisably copies King’s College Chapel, Cambridge in brick. The building cost £11,535, seated 2,000, and was consecrated in March 1829 by the Bishop of London.

The church was thoroughly repaired inside and out in 1867, and restored in 1902. It had two assistant curates in 1859, three in 1896, and none in 1926. Attendances were recorded as 1851: 1,830 a.m.; 951 evg.; 1903: 360 a.m.; 476 p.m. It was declared redundant in 1978 and remained empty until 1980 when it was leased by a Nigerian Pentecostal community, the Celestial Church of Christ. Possession was returned to the Diocese of London in 2018, for restoration and re-opening as a community resource to be known as the Cloudesley Centre.

The tower-less Holy Trinity's most distinctive feature is the large West window, balanced by two octagonal towerlets. The stained glass East window of 1828 by Thomas Willement depicts Richard Cloudesley, with his portrait, kneeling, in the centre, below a canopy, with a long description of his donation. The church is surrounded by a strip of garden, largely grass, a few notable trees, a path around the church, and a few shrubs by the door to the west side. The railings, which had been removed during the Second World War, were restored in 1980.

A war memorial surmounted by a Celtic cross, located in nearby Thornhill Road Gardens, is dedicated to those from Holy Trinity Church who lost their lives during the First World War, the "Lads of Barnsbury".

== Notable residents ==
- John Thomas Emmett (1823-1898), architect, lived at no. 1 in the 1850s
- Thomas Edwards (1779-1858), compiler of the English-Welsh dictionary in 1850, died at no. 10 in 1858
- George Linnaeus Banks (1821-1881), writer and social reformer, and his wife Isabella Banks (1821-1897), novelist and poet, lived at no. 33 in 1864

== In literature ==
The children's book The Cats of Cloudesley Square (2017) by Tony and David Burke involves a group of cats who challenge a property developer to save the church they live in.
