= St Paul's Church, Daybrook =

Church in Nottinghamshire, England

Coordinates: 53.00064°N 1.13778°W

St. Paul’s Church, Daybrook
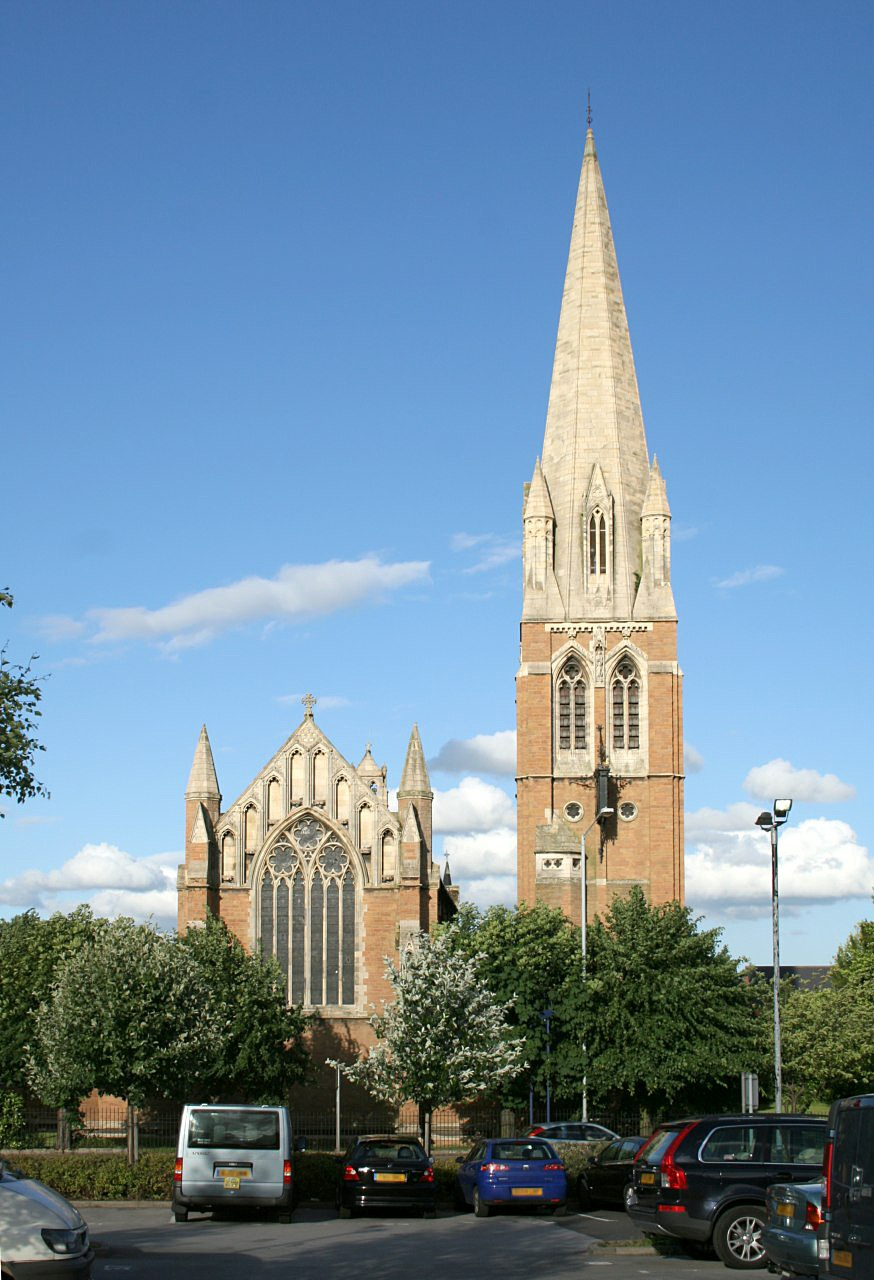
- St. Paul’s Church, Daybrook
- Denomination: Church of England
- Churchmanship: High Church
- Website: https://www.achurchnearyou.com/parish/380287/

History
- Dedication: St. Paul

Administration
- Province: York
- Diocese: Southwell and Nottingham
- Parish: Daybrook

Clergy
- Vicar: Revd Jac Bull

The Church of St. Paul is a parish church in the Church of England, located on Mansfield Road in Daybrook, Nottingham. The parish includes St Timothy church centre.
St Paul's church is a Grade II* listed building by the Department for Digital, Culture, Media and Sport as it is a particularly significant building of more than local interest.

== History ==
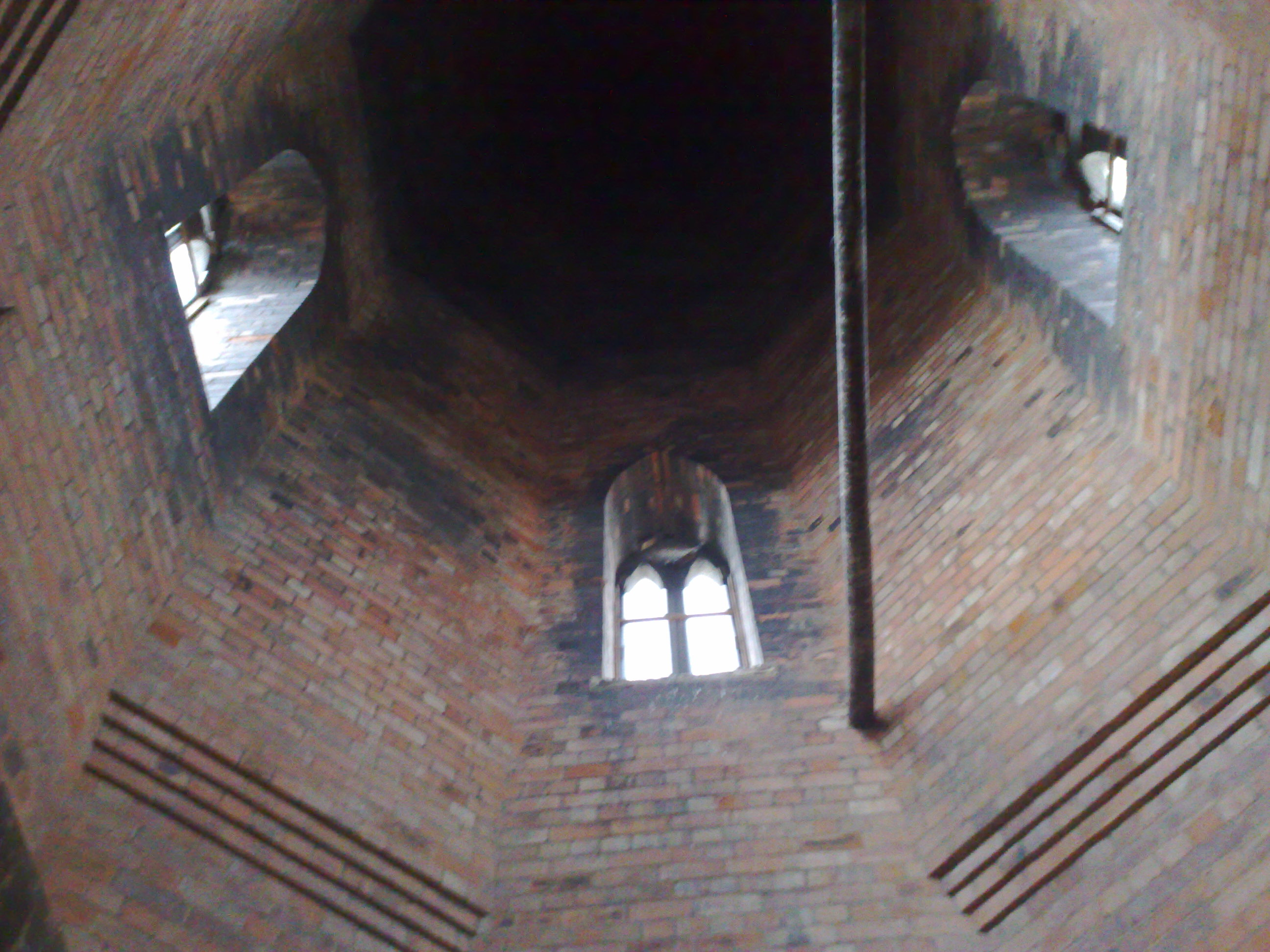
Inside the spire of St Paul's Church

St. Paul's Church was designed by the architect John Loughborough Pearson between 1892 and 1896 and its construction began during May 1893 under the direction of J W Woodsend. Excluding the spire and tower – which were added in 1897 – the church was finished in December 1895 and consecrated on 4 February 1896 in honour of Paul the Apostle, who is depicted on the stained glass of the windows. The cost of building the church was £26,000 (equivalent to £2,990,000 in 2025) and was paid for by Sir Charles Seely.

The spire, added in 1897, rises to a height of 150 feet (46 m).

== Stained glass ==
The stained glass windows are by Clayton and Bell. They illustrate the life and works of Saint Paul.

== Bells ==
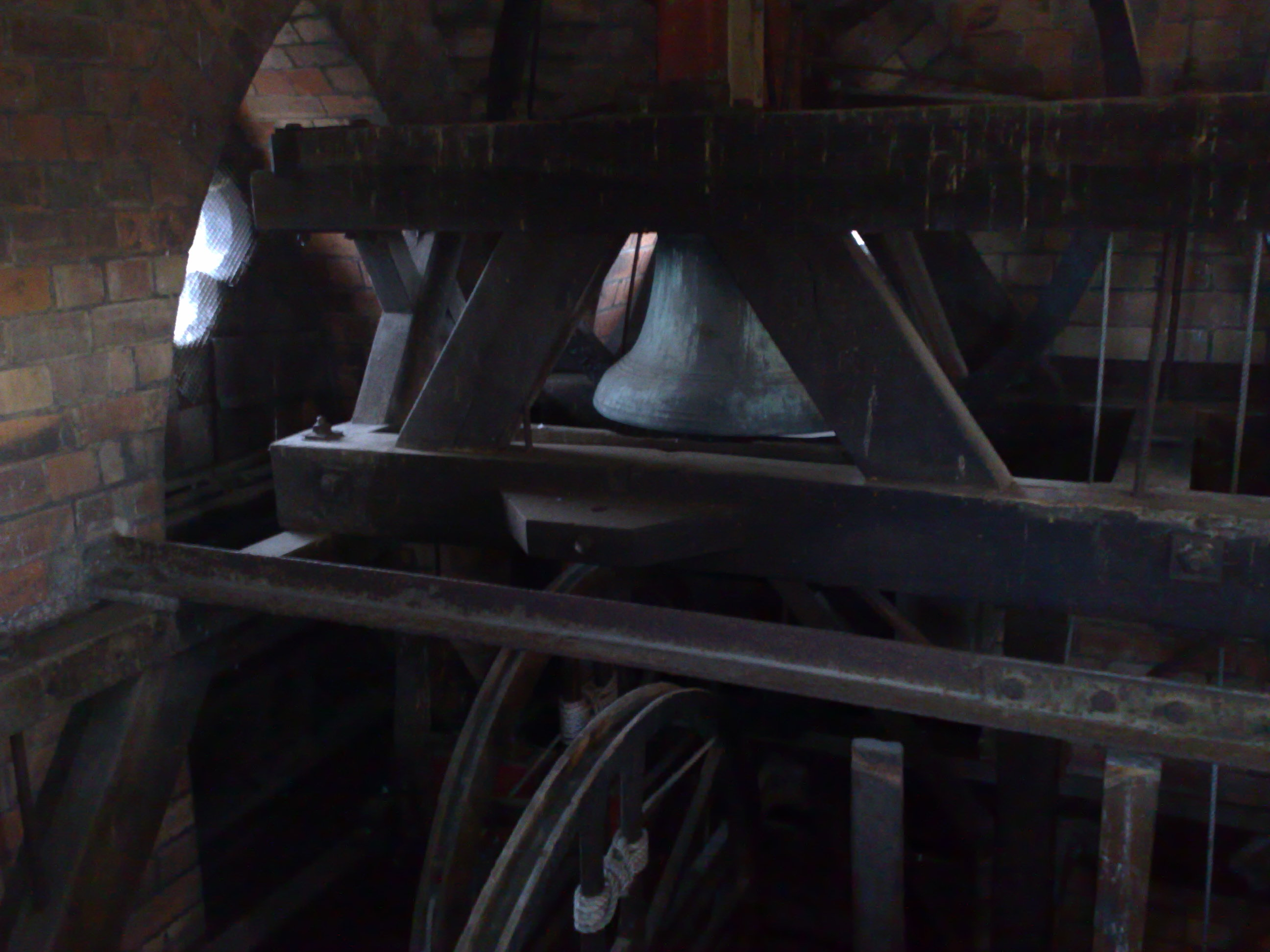
The third bell, plus the wheels of the treble and second below it

There are eight bells in the tower cast by Mears and Stainbank in London in 1897.

== Organ ==
The organ was built by Augustus Gern in 1896. It is a two-manual instrument of twenty-four stops situated in the north chancel aisle and its oaken case is delicately carved and traceried.

List of organists

- Miss Potter c. 1902

== See also ==
- List of new ecclesiastical buildings by J. L. Pearson
- Grade II* listed buildings in Nottinghamshire
- Listed buildings in Gedling (unparished areas)

== Sources ==
- The Buildings of England, Nottinghamshire, 1951, Nikolaus Pevsner
- Department of Culture, Media and Sport. Building listing information.
