= Woodborough Road Baptist Church =

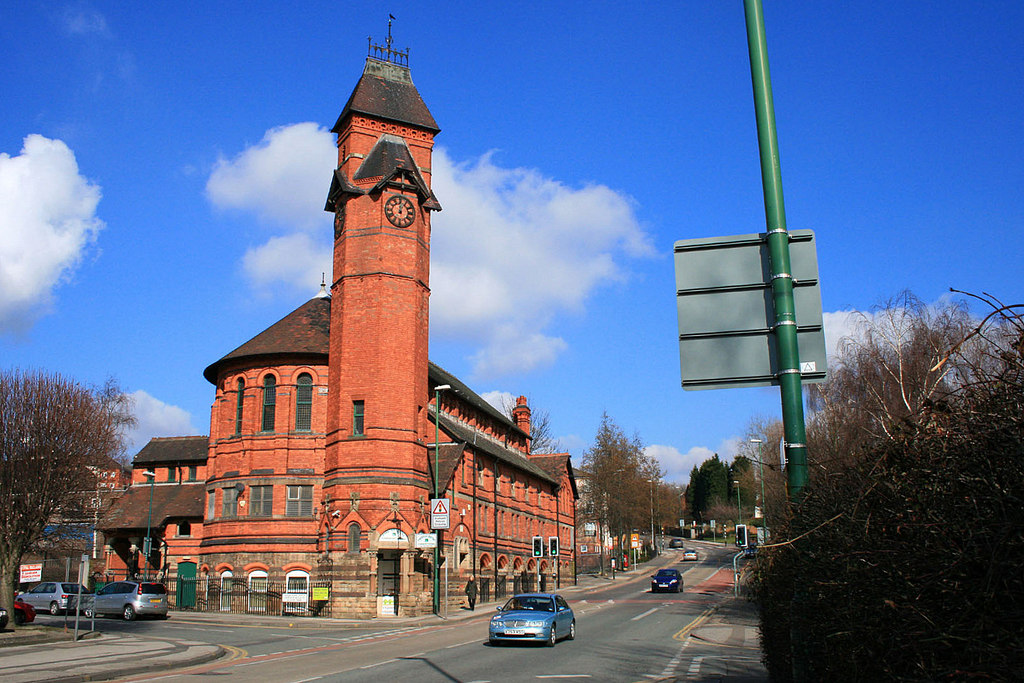
- Former Woodborough Road Baptist Church
- Woodborough Road Baptist Church
- 52.962496°N 1.146004°W
- OS grid reference: SK 57458 40919
- Country: England
- Denomination: Baptist

Architecture
- Architect: Watson Fothergill
- Groundbreaking: 1893
- Completed: 1895
- Construction cost: £5,000

Woodborough Road Baptist Church is a former Baptist Church on Woodborough Road in Nottingham. It is a Grade II listed building. It was converted around 1980 and after being run as the Pakistani League of Friends, is now a Pakistan Community Centre.

== History ==
The congregation formed out of that based at Stoney Street Baptist Church. In 1875 they seceded from the Stoney Street Church, and by the early 1890s had enough resources to commission the architect Watson Fothergill to design a new Church for them on Woodborough Road.

The church was opened on 5 February 1895. The church was described in the Nottingham Evening Post:

It is a commanding structure, and an undoubted ornament to the town. It has a nave of seven bays divided from aisles of slightly unequal width by iron columns, which support a semi-circular arcade and clerestory. The end at the junction of Alfred-street is a portion of a many-sided polygon, whilst the other end is a semi-octagon containing the choristry and platform, the pulpit being in the centre, with the organ behind. The choristry has a circular roof. The pulpit of wood is in front of the baptistery. The galleries which run round the sides, and the circular end in Alfred-street provide 284 sittings. There is sitting accommodation in the chapel itself for about 930 persons. The interior, which is rather unconventional in treatment, is attractive, well lighted, and comfortably heated. The ceiling is of plaster, nicely decorated; the walls being of red brick, relieved with blue and buff bricks in bands. Small squares of tinted glass constitute the windows. A striking feature of the exterior is an octagonal tower, 100 feet high at the juncture of the four roads clock faces being placed on either side of the upper part. Red brick, relieved with blue brick bands, is used for the exterior, but the plinth is of rock-faced Derbyshire stone, with terra-cotta bands. A lobby connecting the two principal entrances is situate in Alfred-street, and no less than five new classrooms have been provided in connection with the schools, three of the old class-rooms having been enlarged and improved.

After a period of decline in the mid 20th century, the church eventually closed, and was converted into a centre for the Pakistani League of Friends. It is now an Islamic Social Centre.
