= Carrington Baptist Church, Nottingham =

- Carrington Baptist Church, Nottingham
- 52°58′27.1″N 1°9′16.6″W
- Location: Nottingham
- Country: England
- Denomination: Baptist

Architecture
- Architect: Abraham Harrison Goodall
- Groundbreaking: 19 August 1882
- Completed: 1883

Carrington Baptist Church was a Baptist church on Sherbrooke Road, Carrington, Nottingham which was opened in 1883.

== History ==
The congregation was formed by three friends from the Stoney Street Baptist Church in 1846. Worship began in the house of Charles Stevenson of Sherwood but they quickly realised the growing need in Carrington and started services in a room above the Co-operative Stores. When they outgrew this in 1849 they moved to other premises in South Street. they purchased an old methodist chapel in 1856 in Wesley Street, Carrington, and by 1870 had erected some temporary school rooms. In 1868 the church took on themselves the debt and became independent from Stoney Street Baptist Church.

The foundation stones of the current building were laid on 19 August 1882 by Mrs. J. Bryan, Alderman Gripper, John Dexter and Mr. J. Rogers JP. The intention was to build school rooms and a lecture hall first, with the lecture hall serving as a temporary chapel until the main chapel could be constructed. The architect who designed the school and lecture hall was Abraham Harrison Goodall.

The school rooms and lecture hall were opened on 7 January 1883

In 1933 the congregation decided to sell the building as a better site had been identified on Valley Road and there was no room for expansion on Sherbrooke Road, but these plans appear to have fallen through.

In 1943, the minister, Walter Abbott, was sent to prison for 3 months and fined £100 (equivalent to £3,900 in 2025) for failing to register for Civil Defence duties.

It is now the Mount Beulah Apostolic Church.

== Ministers ==
- Arthur Sidney Bryant 1926 - 1931
