= Abraham Harrison Goodall =

British architect (1847–1912)

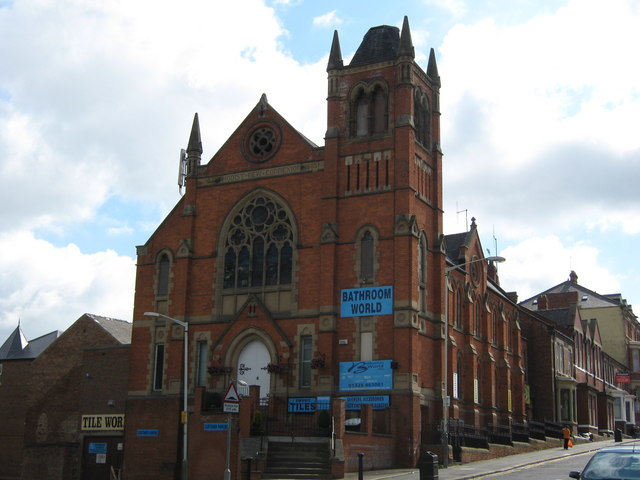
Love Memorial Chapel, Victoria Road, Darlington 1883–84

Abraham Harrison Goodall LRIBA (7 June 1847 – 1912) was a British architect based in Nottingham.

== Biography ==
He was born on 7 June 1847 in Bradford, Yorkshire, to George Goodall and Martha Harrison. He was articled to Richard Charles Sutton between 1863 and 1868 and stayed as his assistant until 1874. He practised as an architect in Nottingham from 1874 until his death. He was responsible for the design of many Methodist New Connexion Chapels in England.

He was appointed a Licentiate of the Royal Institute of British Architects in 1911.

He married Emma Sharp in 1876. Their son Harry H. Goodall (1877–?) followed his father into the profession.

He died in 1912, aged 64 or 65.

== Works ==
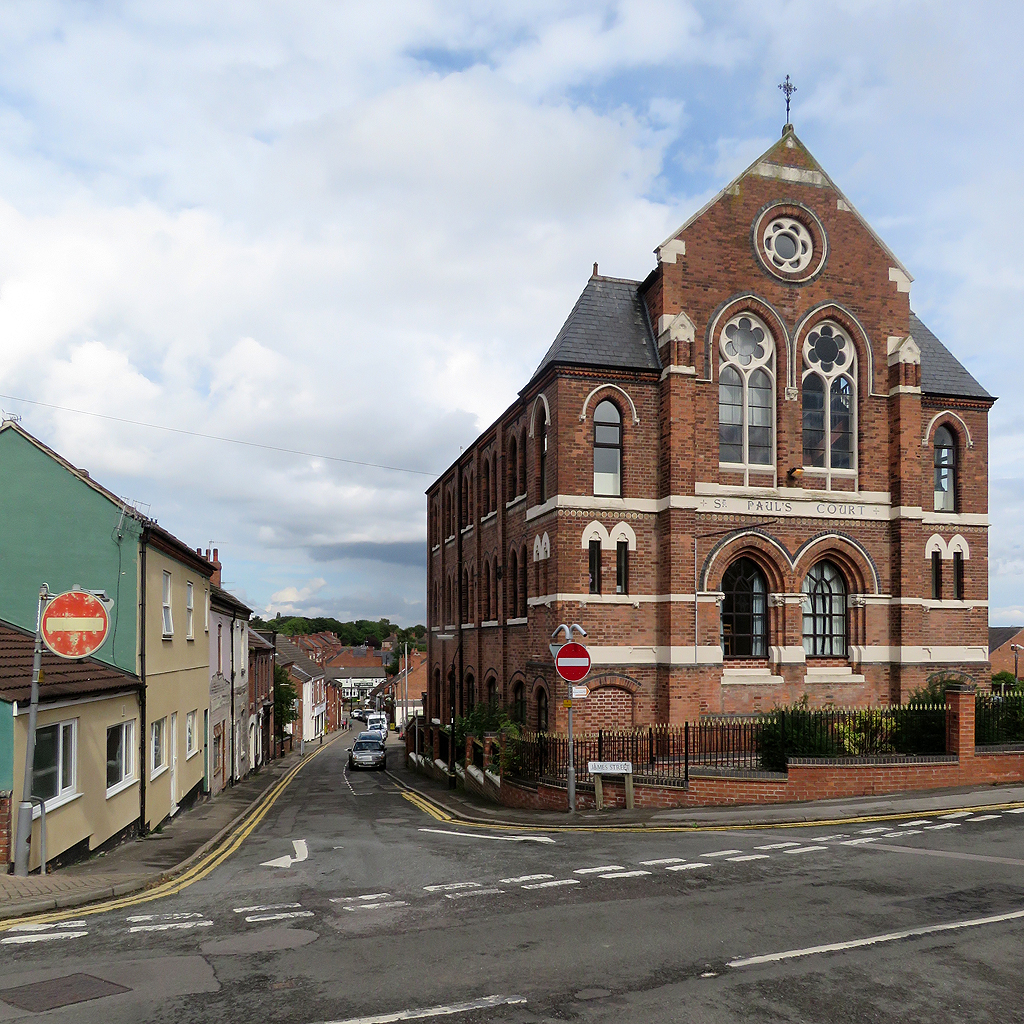
St Paul's Methodist New Connexion Church, Kimberley 1884

- Radford Training Institution, Outgang Lane, Nottingham 1881
- Methodist New Connexion Chapel, Long Eaton 1881–82
- Christ Church / Methodist New Connexion Chapel, Main Street, Bulwell 1882
- Board Schools, Ilkeston Road, Nottingham 1882–83
- General Baptist Chapel, Carrington, Nottingham 1882–83
- Methodist New Connexion Chapel, Archer Street, Hyson Green, Nottingham 1883
- Cigar Factory for Mr. Dexter, Whyburn Street, Hucknall Torkard 1884
- Methodist New Connexion Chapel (Love Memorial Chapel), Victoria Road, Darlington 1883–84
- Board Schools, Alfreton Road, Nottingham.
- Methodist New Connexion Chapel, Redcliffe Road, Nottingham 1884
- Methodist New Connexion Chapel, Kimberley 1884
- Poor Law Offices, Shakespeare Street, Nottingham 1885–86 built at a cost of £14,000 (equivalent to £1,930,000 in 2023) (now Nottingham Registry Offices)
- Methodist New Connexion Chapel, West Kensington 1887
- Methodist New Connexion Chapel, North End Road, Fulham 1888
- Methodist New Connexion Chapel, Stamford Street, Ilkeston 1889
- Methodist New Connexion Chapel, South Street, Sheffield 1890 alterations and enlargement
- Methodist New Connexion Chapel, Railway Road, King’s Lynn 1891
- St Paul’s Methodist New Connexion Church, Melbourne Road, Leicester 1891
- Parliament Street Methodist Church, Nottingham 1892 renovations
- 15-17 King Street, Nottingham 1895–96
- Boden and Company Lace Warehouse, 22 Fletcher Gate, Nottingham 1895–98
- Trinity Church Sunday School, Baker Street, Hucknall 1903
- Baptist Church, Peartree Road, Derby 1903
- Methodist New Connexion Chapel, Bobbers Mill, Nottingham 1907
- Westminster Buildings, Upper Parliament Street, Nottingham 1909
- Heanor Baptist New Schools, 1909–10
