= War Memorial Cross, Beeston =

Grade II listed war memorial in Beeston, Nottinghamshire

- United Kingdom
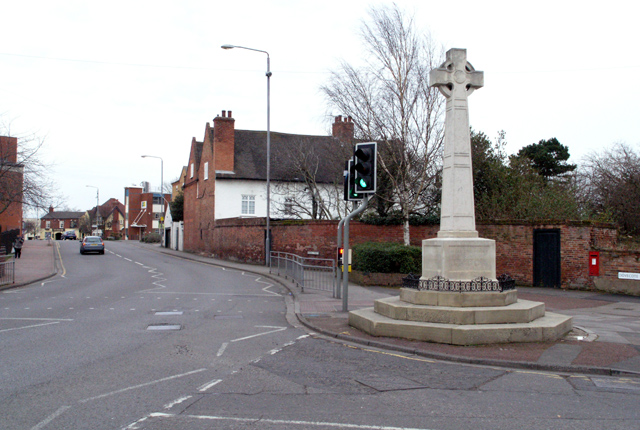
- For Men of Beeston who died in the first and second world wars.
- Unveiled: 21 May 1921
- Location: 52.924312°N 1.215625°W; Beeston, Nottinghamshire
- Designed by: William Herbert Higginbottom

War Memorial Cross, Beeston is a Grade II listed structure in Beeston, Nottinghamshire.

== History ==
It was designed by the architect William Herbert Higginbottom. Constructed in Portland stone 19 feet (5.8 m) in height, it comprises an octagonal plinth of three steps, the top step ornamented. The square plinth contains recessed panels, three of them are inscribed. The plinth is topped with a Celtic cross with panelled tapered square shaft. The Cross is a replica of that on the Island of Iona.

The memorial was unveiled on 21 May 1921 by Colonel Sir Launcelot Rolleston K.C.B. D.S.O. to commemorate the 170 men of Beeston who died serving in the armed forces during First World War. Additional inscriptions were added in 1945.

The inscriptions read:

- By their Valour and the grace of God, they Won.
- In grateful memory of those who gave their lives in the Great War 1914 – 1918
- World War 1939 – 1945

It was restored in 2009.

== See also ==
- Listed buildings in Beeston, Nottinghamshire
