= Nottingham Arts Theatre =

Theatre in Nottingham, United Kingdom

Coordinates: 52.95429°N 1.14489°W

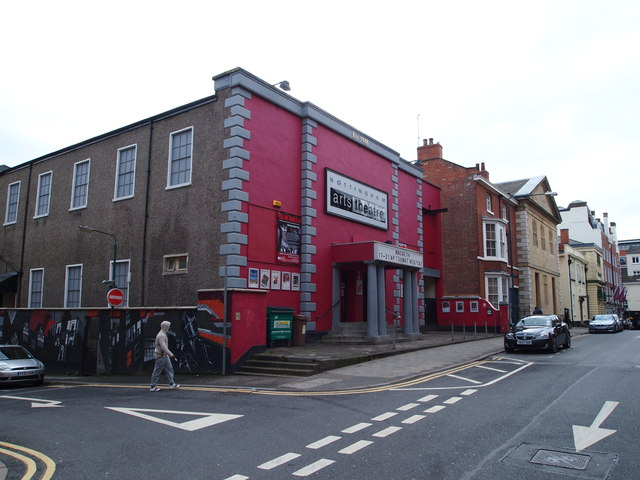
Nottingham Arts Theatre

Nottingham Arts Theatre is a theatre on George Street in Nottingham, England. Formerly known as the Co-op Arts Theatre, it is located in the former George Street Particular Baptist Church building.

It has a seating capacity of 274 in the Auditorium and a newer, 50-seat studio theatre.

It is operated by an educational charity and has a very active youth theatre company which stages multiple productions and showcases each year. It also stages a pantomime annually.

== Productions ==
In recent years it has put on shows such as:

- Shrek The Musical (Junior), Youth Theatre (2025)
- School of Rock (2024)
- The King and I (2010)
- Les Misérables, Youth Theatre (2009)
- Our Day Out, Youth Theatre (2010)
- RENT: School Edition, Youth Theatre (2011)
- Dangerous Corner (2010)
- Annie Get Your Gun (2011)
- Run for Your Wife (2010)
- Tommy (2009)
- The Roses of Eyam (2011)
- A Midsummer Night's Dream (2008)
- The Full Monty (2011)

The theatre's 2012 pantomime production of Puss in Boots was the subject of a documentary, Panto!, by Jeanie Finlay, which was a co-production by Glimmer Films and Met Film Production for BBC Storyville. It was first aired on BBC Four on Monday 22 December 2014.
