= Daybrook Baptist Church =

- Daybrook Baptist Church
- 52°59′45″N 1°08′15″W
- Location: Daybrook
- Country: England
- Denomination: Baptist

Architecture
- Architect: William Herbert Higginbottom
- Completed: 1912

Daybrook Baptist Church is on Mansfield Road in Daybrook, near Arnold, Nottingham.

== History ==
A Baptist congregation was established in Arnold, Nottingham in 1844. The first church was built in 1859. The foundation stone was laid on 8 March 1859, with financial assistance from Broad Street Baptist Church but was unsafe by 1911, so was demolished.

The current building was erected to designs by the architect William Herbert Higginbottom, and opened in November 1912.
