= Sir John Robinson's Almshouses =

Almshouses in Daybrook, Arnold, Nottinghamshire

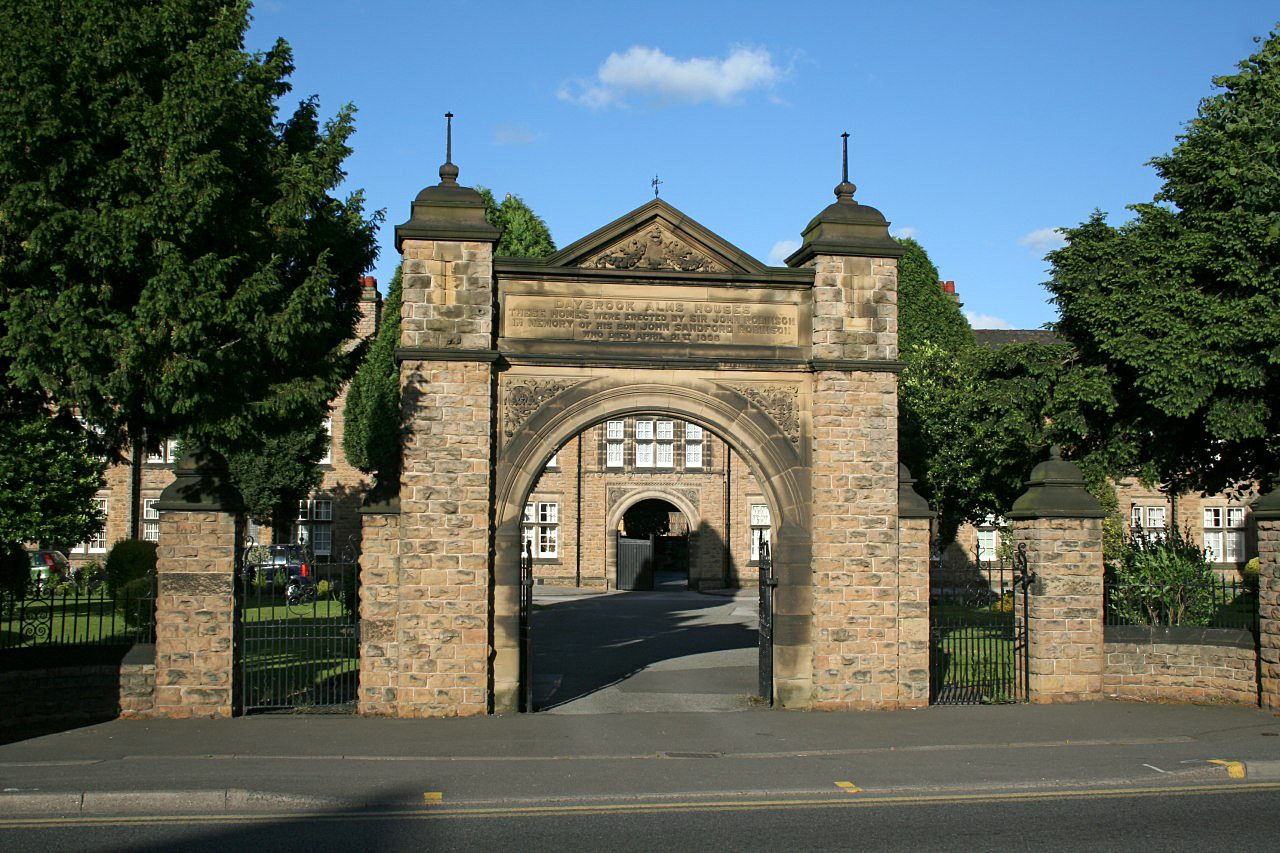
- The entrance gate to the almshouses in 2008

- Location of Sir John Robinson's Almshouses in Nottinghamshire
- 52°59′58.4″N 1°8′16.7″W
- Location: Nottingham, Nottinghamshire, England

History
- Built: 1899
- Built for: Sir John Robinson

Site notes
- Architect: William Herbert Higginbottom

Listed Building – Grade II

The Sir John Robinson Almshouses (commonly the Daybrook Almshouses) are a collection of twelve two-bedroom cottages erected in 1899 on Mansfield Road, Daybrook, Arnold, Nottingham, England.

The almshouses are charitable low-rent housing provided and maintained by the Sir John Robinson Homes charity (England and Wales Registered Charity No. 217941) to enable fully retired elderly people over the age of 60 years (who are able to care for themselves) to live in Daybrook.

Sir John Robinson of the Home Brewery (Nottingham-based) built the almshouses and Daybrook Laundry in memory of his son John Sandford Robinson, an amateur jockey, who died in a horse-racing accident on 21 April 1898, aged 30 years.

Notably, King George V visited the almshouses on 24 June 1914.

There is a further group of 12 two-bedroom houses that were built earlier in 1889, in Sherwood, as Sir John Robinson alms houses in honour of his son's 21st birthday.
