= Cross Street Baptist Church =

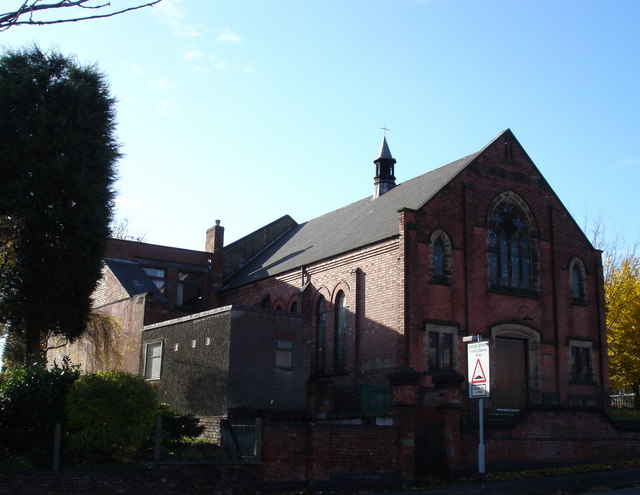
- Cross Street Baptist Church
- 53°00′23″N 1°07′46″W
- Location: Arnold, Nottingham
- Country: England
- Denomination: Baptist

History
- Status: Closed, awaiting redevelopment

Architecture
- Architect: William Herbert Higginbottom
- Groundbreaking: October 1908
- Completed: 18 February 1909
- Construction cost: £900 (£92,623 in 2025)
- Closed: 2020

Specifications
- Capacity: 250 people

Cross Street Baptist Church is on Cross Street in Arnold, Nottinghamshire.

== History ==
The original Baptist chapel on this site was built in 1825 by the George Street Particular Baptist Church. It was sold in the middle of the nineteenth century to the Scotch Baptists of Park Street.

The current building was erected to designs by the architect William Herbert Higginbottom, and opened on 18 February 1909.

The church was closed in 2020, and following vandalism by trespassers plans for redevelopment into apartments was submitted in 2024.
