= Parliament Street Methodist Church =

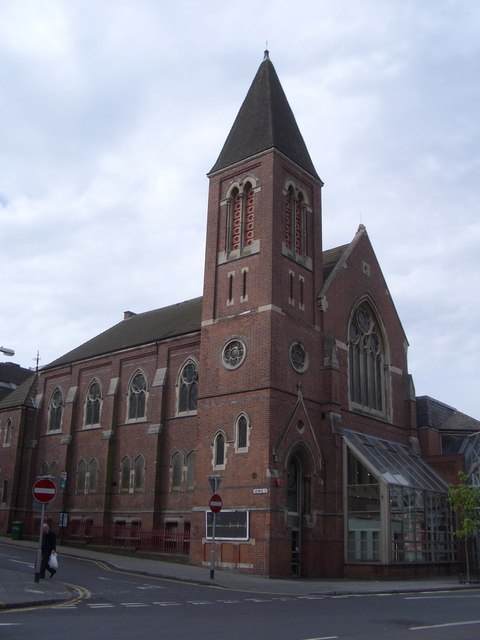
- Parliament Street Methodist Church
- Parliament Street Methodist Church
- 52.955025°N 1.145853°W
- Country: England
- Denomination: Methodist
- Website: lifeatthecentre.com

Architecture
- Architect: Richard Charles Sutton
- Groundbreaking: 1874
- Completed: 1875
- Construction cost: £6,000

Parliament Street Methodist Church is a Methodist church on Parliament Street in Nottingham.

== History ==
The congregation originated as New Connexion Methodists from a chapel in Hockley after their split from the Wesleyans in 1797.

The first building on the Parliament Street site opened on 4 April 1817. It was made of brick and plaster to seat five hundred but on 15 February 1826 the church re-opened with a gallery to increase the seating to one thousand.

On 11 August 1874 the foundation stone of the present church was laid by Alderman W. Foster. The architect was Richard Charles Sutton. Mr Mayball of Lenton was the contractor. The building was opened on 27 May 1875. The church was renovated by Abraham Harrison Goodall in 1892.

The building was refurbished and re-organised in 1989 by Bodill and Sons under the supervision of the architect, G. Birkett, when the congregation merged with that of the Albert Hall, Nottingham. During the period of construction, services were held in St. Catharine's Church, Nottingham.

== Organ ==
The Conacher pipe organ was installed when the church was built in 1874. It appears to have cost £570. It was cleaned in 1966. It is maintained by Henry Willis & Sons. A specification of the organ can be found on the National Pipe Organ register.

=== Organists ===
- John Callis Brydson 1922-1930 (formerly organist of United Methodist Chapel, Sutton Bonnington, afterwards organist of Baxter Gate Baptist Chapel, Loughborough)
