= Broad Street Baptist Church =

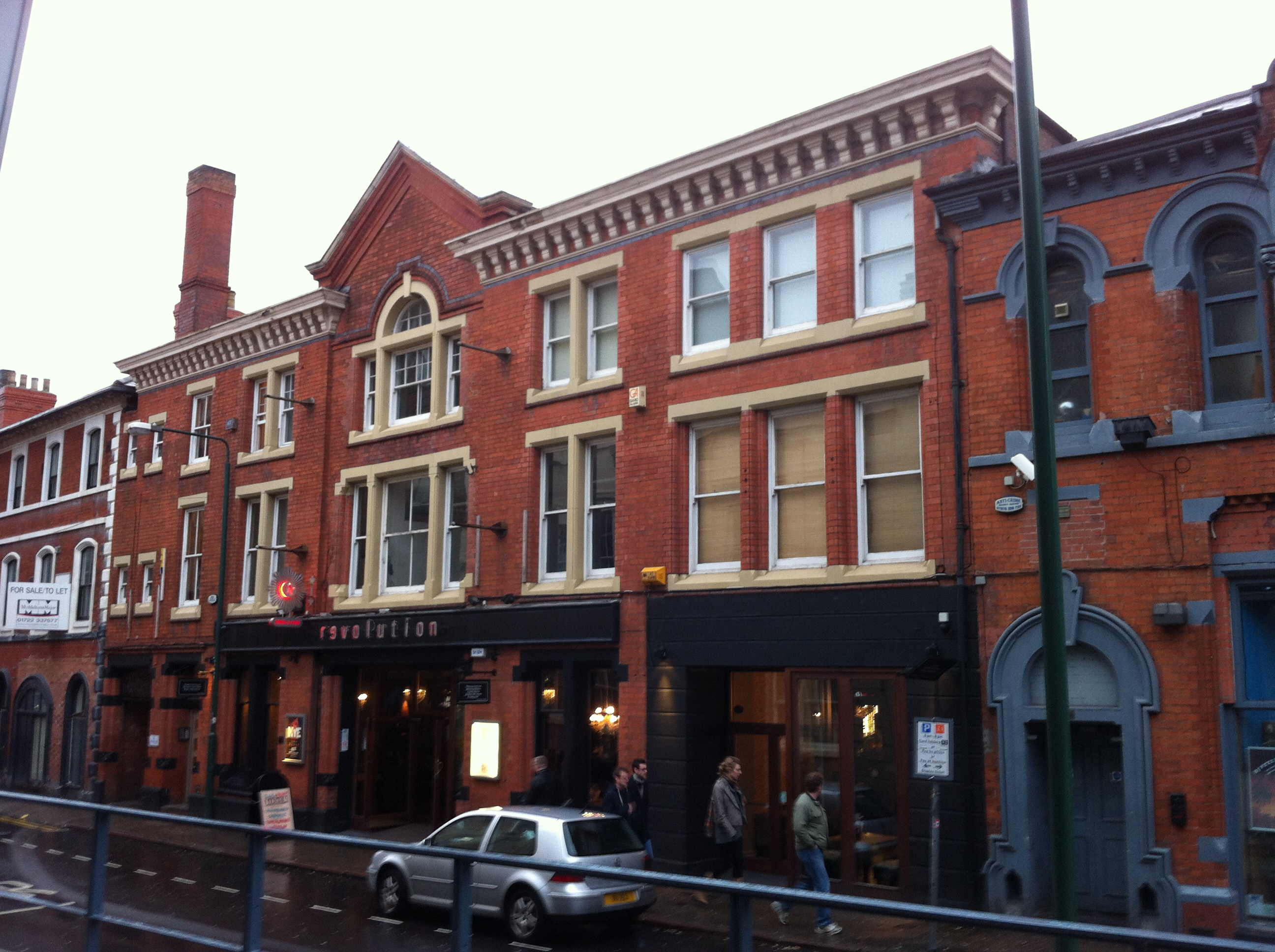
- Former Broad Street Baptist Church
- Broad Street Baptist Church
- 52.954333°N 1.14400°W
- Location: Nottingham
- Country: England
- Denomination: General Baptist

Architecture
- Completed: 1818
- Closed: 1901

Broad Street Baptist Church was a former Baptist Church in Nottingham from 1818 to 1901. The building is now occupied by the Revolution bar.

== History ==
The church was established as a General Baptist Church in 1817 when a schism split the congregation of Stoney Street Baptist Church, and the ousted minister, Rev. Robert Smith, took his followers to set up a new church. New buildings were erected in Broad Street in 1818, and adjacent Sunday School buildings followed a few years later.

In 1842 the congregation received an invitation from the nearby George Street Particular Baptist Church suggesting a joint celebration of the 50th anniversary of the Particular Baptist Missionary Society. Although this didn't initially result in closer co-operation, further initiatives a few years later resulted in a closer working relationship with other Baptist groups through the Baptist Union.

The congregation sponsored the development of other Baptist Churches, and in 1859 contributed towards the building of Daybrook Baptist Church.

The chapel merged with Milton Street General Baptist chapel (later Mansfield Road Baptist Church) in 1901.

The chapel was converted to a lace warehouse in 1903 by Hedley John Price, and then in the late 20th century to the Revolution bar. The Sunday School building became another bar, Muse.

== Ministers ==
- Robert Smith
- Adam Smith
- Richard Ingham 1834 - 1838
- W.R. Stevenson 1851 - 1876

== Organ ==
The church used stringed instruments until a harmonium was purchased in 1857. In 1869 a new pipe organ was installed by local builder Lloyd and Dudgeon.
