= St Paul's Church, Carlton-in-the-Willows =

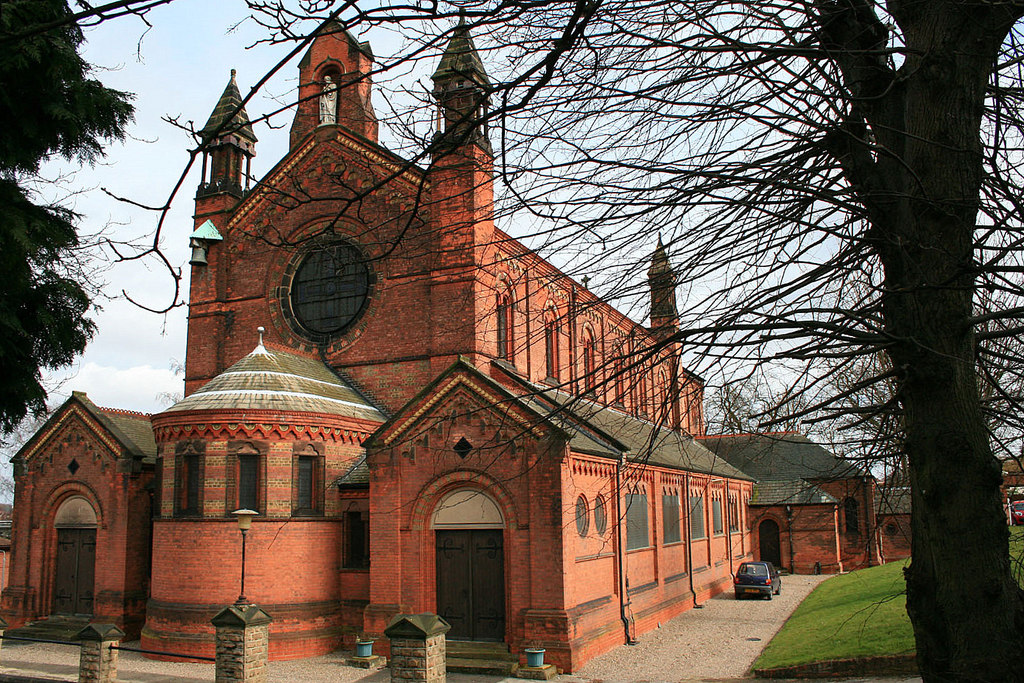
- St Paul's Church, Carlton-in-the-Willows
- St Paul's Church, Carlton-in-the-Willows
- 52.965762°N 1.090552°W
- OS grid reference: SK 61190 41323
- Location: Carlton, Nottinghamshire
- Country: England
- Denomination: Church of England
- Website: www.stpaulscarlton.org

History
- Dedication: St. Paul

Architecture
- Architect: W. A. Coombs
- Groundbreaking: 1885
- Completed: 1891

Administration
- Diocese: Diocese of Southwell and Nottingham

St Paul's Church, Carlton-in-the-Willows is a parish church in the Church of England in Carlton, Nottinghamshire. It is a Grade II listed building.

== History ==
The church was commissioned by Henry Herbert, 4th Earl of Carnarvon. He died in 1890, however, just before the church was completed. His wife commissioned a cross in his memory which hangs in the church.

The church contains some panelled oak stalls and desks carved by Eric Gill dating from 1903.

== Organ ==
The church contains a pipe organ by E. Wragg & Son. A specification of the organ can be found on the National Pipe Organ Register.

=== Organists ===
- W.S. Ward 1908 – ca. 1927
- Harold Scarborough ca. 1929–1935
- Sydney James Burdett 1935–1950 (formerly organist at Old Radford Church)

== See also ==
- Listed buildings in Gedling (unparished areas)
