= Thomas Edwards (author) =

Welsh writer and lexicographer (1779–1858)

- Born: 1779
- Died: 4 June 1858 (aged 78–79); London
- Occupation: Author
- Known for: English and Welsh Dictionary

Thomas Edwards (Caerfallwch, 1779–1858), was a Welsh writer and lexicographer born in Northop, Flintshire, Wales. He wrote an Analysis of Welsh Orthography and an English and Welsh Dictionary.

== Life and writings ==
At the age of 14, Edwards was apprenticed to a saddler named Birch, in whose family he cultivated his taste for Welsh-language literature. He married in 1801 or 1802. He moved to London and became a secretary to Nathaniel M. Rothschild.

In 1838, Edwards was appointed with five others to improve Welsh orthography, in connection with the Abergavenny Eisteddfod. In 1845 he published his Analysis of Welsh Orthography. For many years he was a member of the Cymmrodorion and delivered several lectures there. One of them, entitled "Currency", later appeared in print. In addition, he was a frequent contributor to Welsh magazines.

== Dictionary ==
Edwards's most notable work was his English and Welsh Dictionary, published by Evans of Holywell, Flintshire in 1850. A second edition appeared in 1864, and then another in the United States. It is considered by some to be the best dictionary of the Welsh language.

== Death ==
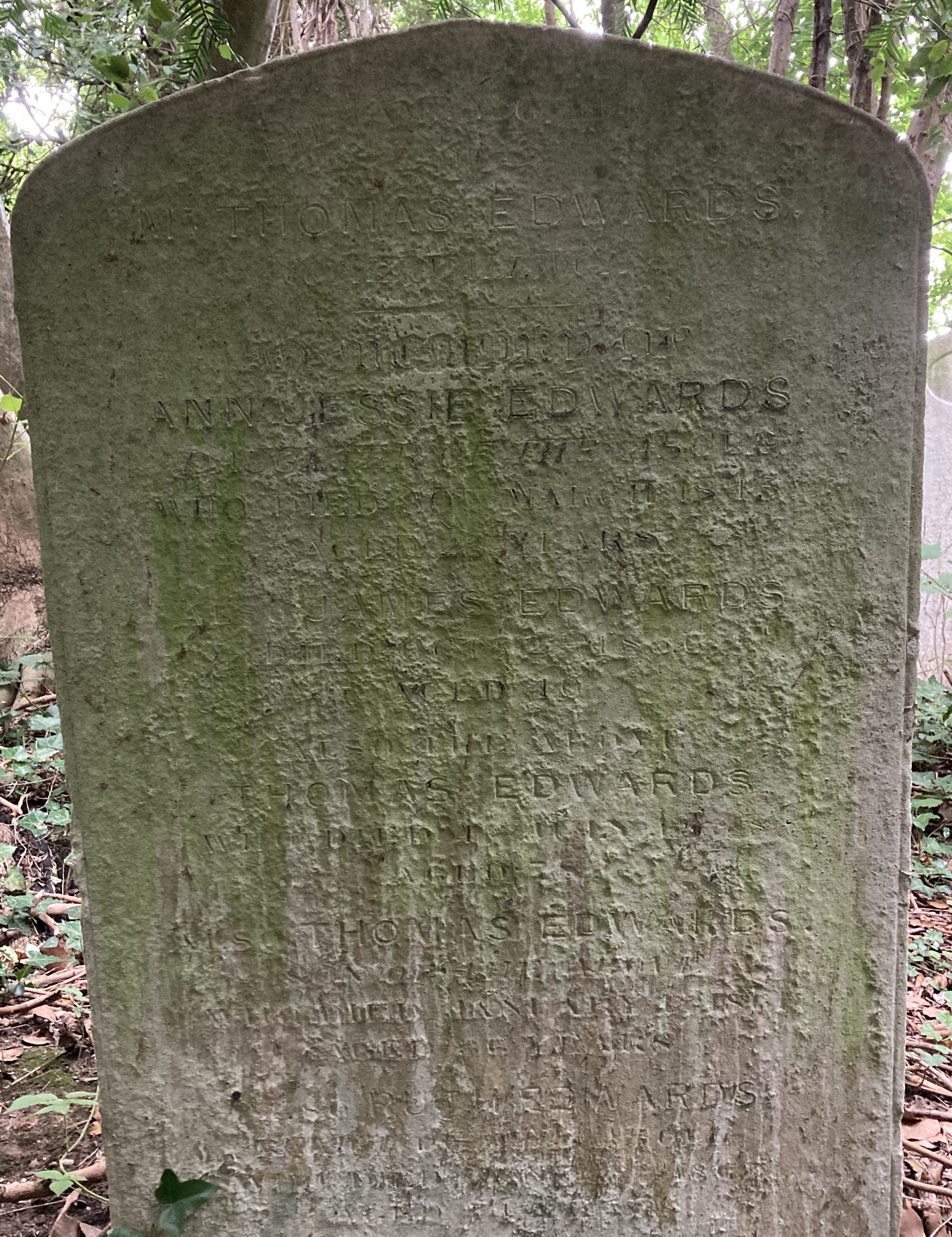
Family grave of Thomas Edwards in Highgate Cemetery

Thomas Edwards died at 10 Cloudesley Square, London, on 4 June 1858. He was interred in a family grave in Highgate Cemetery, near the top end on the western side.
