= George Street Particular Baptist Church =

Former Particular Baptist church in Nottingham

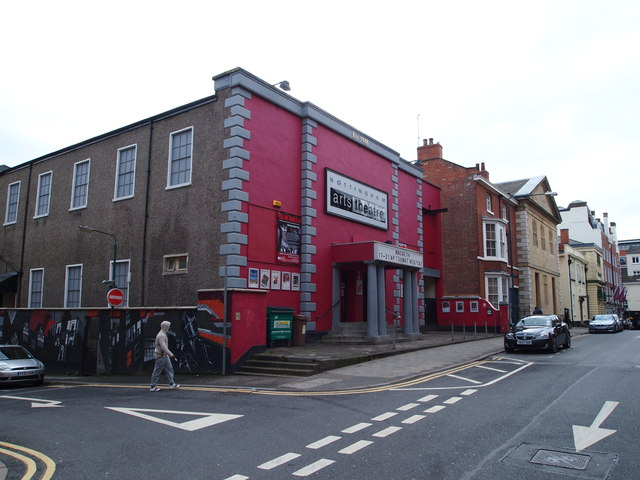
- Former George Street Particular Baptist Church, now an Arts Theatre
- George Street Particular Baptist Church
- 52.95429°N 1.14489°W
- Location: Nottingham
- Country: England
- Denomination: Particular Baptist

Architecture
- Architect: Edward Staveley
- Completed: 16 August 1815
- Construction cost: £6,000 (equivalent to £461,898 in 2025)

George Street Particular Baptist Church was a former Baptist Church in Nottingham from 1815 to 1948. The building is now in use as Nottingham Arts Theatre.

== History ==
The congregation had its roots in Friar Lane Baptist Church, which it outgrew by the early nineteenth century. It commissioned a new building on George Street which opened in 1815. It was built to designs by the architect Edward Staveley. It had seating for 1,000 people. The congregation also formed Cross Street Baptist Church in Arnold, Nottingham.

In 1847 the church underwent a schism and part of the congregation left to form Derby Road Particular Baptist Church.

It was remodelled as a Co-operative Theatre in 1948 by A.H. Betts.

== Ministers ==
- John Jarman 1803 - 1830
- James Edwards 1830 - ????

== Organ ==
The church was the first Baptist church in Nottingham to purchase an organ, which it did in 1847. It was erected by Messrs. Bevington and Sons of London, at a cost of £220 (equivalent to £19,733 in 2025) (It is possible that the church authorities had seen the organ by the same builders erected the previous year in St. Paul's Church on the opposite side of George Street.)
