= Redcliffe Road Methodist Chapel, Nottingham =

Redliffe Road Methodist Church, Nottingham
- Redliffe Road Methodist Church, Nottingham
- 52°58′10.1″N 1°9′11.3″W
- Location: Nottingham
- Country: England
- Denomination: United Methodist

Architecture
- Architect: Abraham Harrison Goodall
- Groundbreaking: 18 October 1883
- Completed: May 1884
- Construction cost: £9,960 (equivalent to £1,070,100 in 2025)
- Demolished: 1969

Redcliffe Road Methodist Church was a Methodist church on Redcliffe Road, Nottingham from 1884 until 1969.

== History ==
The church began on Mars Hill, Mansfield Road, then it moved to rooms in Sherwood Street before then moving to an iron chapel on Woodborough Road.

The foundation stones of the building on Redcliffe Road were laid on 18 October 1883 and it opened for worship on 29 May 1884. It was built by the contractors George Bell and Sons of Sherwood Street, Nottingham, to the designs of the architect Abraham Harrison Goodall and had extensive school accommodation underneath.

The principal promoters of the church were George Goodall, J.P., Alderman Lindley, Messrs. Inger, Sharpe & Cooper. Part of the cost of construction was realised through the sale of freehold property owned by the church on Woodborough Road. It was built originally as a New Connexion Methodist Church, but was later a United Methodist Church.

The church building was demolished in 1969.

== Ministers ==
- W.J. Hopper 1925–1927
