= Mansfield Road Baptist Church =

- Mansfield Road Baptist Church in June 2025
- Mansfield Road Baptist Church
- 52.968224°N 1.156314°W
- Country: England
- Denomination: Baptist
- Website: mrbc.org.uk

Architecture
- Architect: Ernest Richard Eckett Sutton
- Groundbreaking: 26 September 1912
- Completed: 1913

Mansfield Road Baptist Church is a Baptist church in Nottingham, England. It is affiliated with the Baptist Union of Great Britain.

== History ==
Mansfield Road Baptist Church has its origins in a split within the congregation of Stoney Street Baptist Church in Nottingham in 1849.

They built a new chapel on Milton Street which opened in 1851. In 1863 they appointed as minister Samuel Cox, a very active journalist and author, whose 1877 book 'Salvator Mundi' was a major irritant to Charles Spurgeon, who suspected Cox of being a universalist. Cox remained at this church until 1888.

In 1901 they were joined by the congregation of Broad Street Baptist Church. In 1912 they moved out to the current church which was newly built on the corner of Gregory Boulevard and Sherwood Rise. The Milton Street chapel was sold, and became a lecture hall for the adjacent Nottingham Mechanics' Institution.

== Organ ==
The pipe organ was installed in 1913 by Norman and Beard. A specification of the organ can be found on the National Pipe Organ Register.
