= Derby Road Baptist Church =

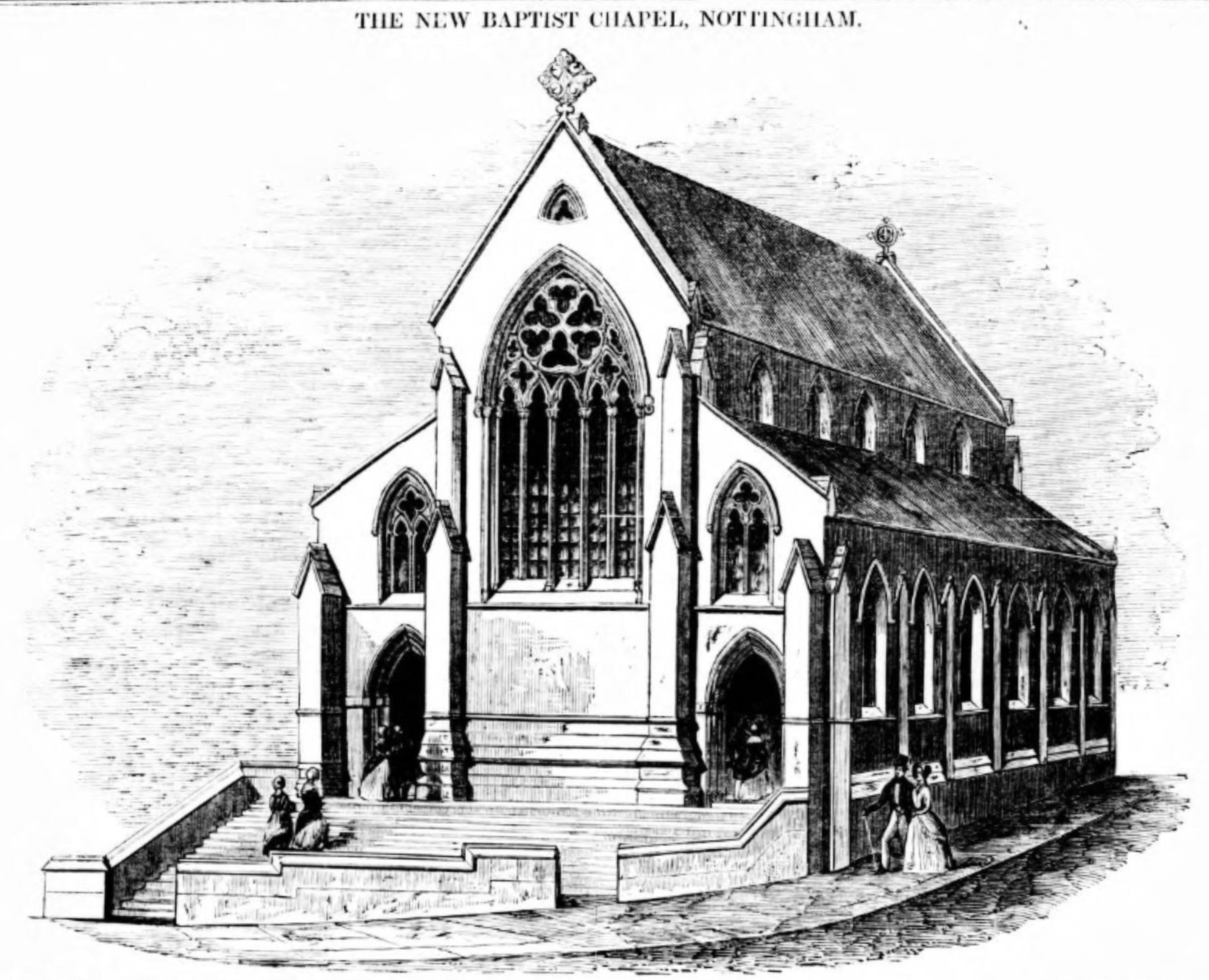
- From the Nottingham Review and General Advertiser for the Midland Counties. 12 July 1850
- Derby Road Baptist Church
- 52.954409°N 1.160452°W
- Location: Nottingham
- Country: England
- Denomination: Particular Baptist

Architecture
- Architect(s): John Thomas Emmett and William Booker
- Groundbreaking: 1849
- Completed: 1850
- Construction cost: £6,000 (equivalent to £698,345 in 2025)
- Closed: 1967
- Demolished: 1971

Derby Road Particular Baptist Church was a former Baptist Church in Nottingham from 1850 to 1967.

== History ==
The Derby Road Baptist Church was founded as a separate community from the George Street Particular Baptist Church on 11 February 1847.

A site was purchased from the 4th Duke of Newcastle on Derby Road. The foundation stone was laid on 30 July 1849 by Samuel Morton Peto, MP for Norwich, and the church was erected and opened on 9 July 1850 at a cost of £5,000 (equivalent to £582,000 in 2025).

The church experienced a disastrous fire on 1 January 1893 which caused much damage and forced the congregation to relocate for nearly a full year. However the organ was replaced in 1894 and new choir stalls were installed in 1895 to accommodate a choir of 40.

In 1946, many of the congregation from the George Street Particular Baptist Church transferred to Derby Road.

The church closed in 1967 and the congregation joined with Lenton General Baptists to build a new church, Thomas Helwys Baptist Church in Lenton which opened on 4 July 1968.

In 1971 College House was built on the site.

== Ministers ==
- Joseph Ash Baynes
- James Martin 1858–1869
- Edward Medley 1876–1891
- George Hill 1893 continuing

== Organ ==
The church purchased a 3 manual organ in 1850 from Bevington. This was modified by Peter Conacher and Co in 1873.

In 1894 Peter Conacher provided a new organ to replace the previous one which had been destroyed by fire. A specification of the organ can be found on the National Pipe Organ Register.

When the church closed, the organ was transferred to Gresham's School.
