= Stoney Street Baptist Church =

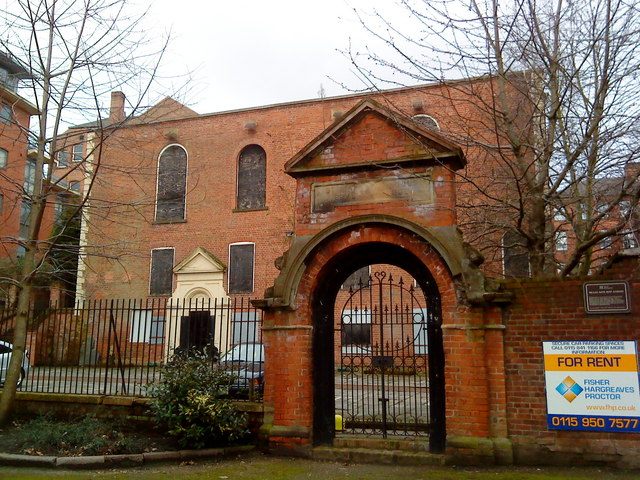
- Stoney Street Baptist Church
- Stoney Street Baptist Church
- 52.952295°N 1.141293°W
- OS grid reference: SK 57770 39766
- Country: England
- Denomination: Baptist

Architecture
- Completed: 1799

Stoney Street Baptist Chapel is a former Baptist Church on Plumptre Place Road in Nottingham. It is a Grade II listed building. Later it served as St. Mary's Schools, and then as a commercial premises.

== History ==
Stoney Street Chapel was located on Plumptre Place, just off Stoney Street in Nottingham. The congregation formed from the Nottingham General Baptists in 1775. Initially from 1783, the congregation was based in the Methodist Tabernacle, but they built a new chapel in 1799.

In 1846, three friends established a new congregation in Sherwood, and this later developed to form Carrington Baptist Church, Nottingham.

=== The schism of 1817 ===
In 1817 a disruption took place which split the church and caused a scandal. A young minister named Catton was engaged for a trial period. He was accused of indiscretion toward a woman. Rumours of the incident spread. They were denied and the congregation took sides. The church trustees dismissed Catton and advised the minister, Robert Smith, to take possession of the church. On 3 August 1817 the attempt was resisted by force, Smith withdrew from the church, and a third of its members went with him to found Broad Street Baptist Church.

=== The schism of 1849 ===
A further schism in 1849 formed Mansfield Road Baptist Church (initially known as Milton Street General Baptist Chapel). This schisms was caused by the question of whether a deacon, a butcher by trade, who had been guilty of using unequal weights, should be suspended.

=== The schism of 1875 ===
A schism occurred in 1875, the causes of which are not clear, but many members of the church left and founded Woodborough Road Baptist Church. This left the Stoney Street chapel vulnerable, as the area had become commercial and industrial, and it was to survive as a chapel for only a few more years.

=== Closure as a baptist chapel ===
Stoney Street Baptist Chapel closed on 18 September 1887, and many of the congregation joined Woodborough Road Baptist Church. The chapel was converted into buildings for St Mary's School by the architect Thomas Chambers Hine.

In 1993 the buildings were again converted following a fire.

== List of ministers ==
- Robert Smith 1784 - 1817
- W Pickering 1819 - 1848
- Hugh Hunter 1848 - 1866
- James Greenwood 1867 - 1870
- T Ryder 1870 - 1875
- G.H. Malins 1876
- R Foulkes Griffiths 1877 - 1885
