= Daybrook =

Suburb of Arnold, Nottinghamshire, England

Coordinates: 52.999°N 1.138°W

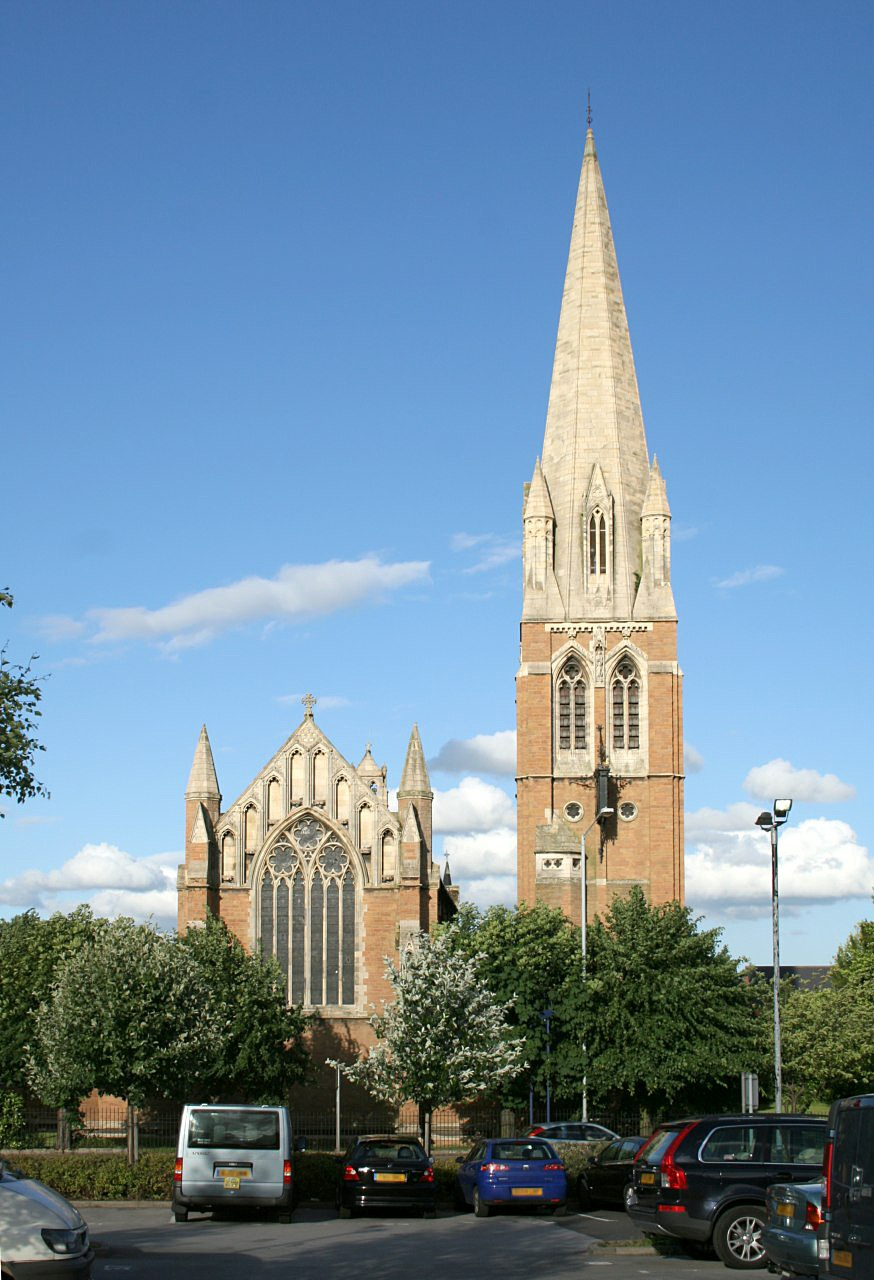
- St. Paul’s Church

- Location within Nottinghamshire
- Population: 4,997
- OS grid reference: SK 57844 45012
- District: Borough of Gedling
- Shire county: Nottinghamshire
- Region: East Midlands
- Country: England
- Sovereign state: United Kingdom
- Post town: NOTTINGHAM
- Postcode district: NG5
- Dialling code: 0115
- Police: Nottinghamshire
- Fire: Nottinghamshire
- Ambulance: East Midlands
- UK Parliament: Gedling

Daybrook is a suburb of Arnold, Nottinghamshire. The area is located just outside the city of Nottingham but inside the conurbation of Greater Nottingham. It lies next to the areas of Arnold town centre, Sherwood, Woodthorpe, Redhill and Bestwood.

It is named for the Day Brook watercourse that flows through the area. The stream is a tributary of the River Leen.

== Landmarks ==
Church of St. Paul

The area is dominated by the spire and tower of St. Paul’s Church which rise to a height of 150 feet (46 m). The church was designed 1892–1896 by John Loughborough Pearson and its construction started in May 1893. In December 1895 it was completed – except for the spire and tower, which were added in 1897. The church, located on Mansfield Road, was consecrated in February 1896 in honour of Paul the Apostle and is now a Grade II* listed building.

Sir John Robinson’s Almshouses

Adjacent to St. Paul’s Church are the Sir John Robinson Almshouses (commonly known as the 'Daybrook Almshouses'), Mansfield Road. Built in 1899 in Daybrook by local businessman and philanthropist Sir John Robinson, they are now Grade II listed.

Home Brewery

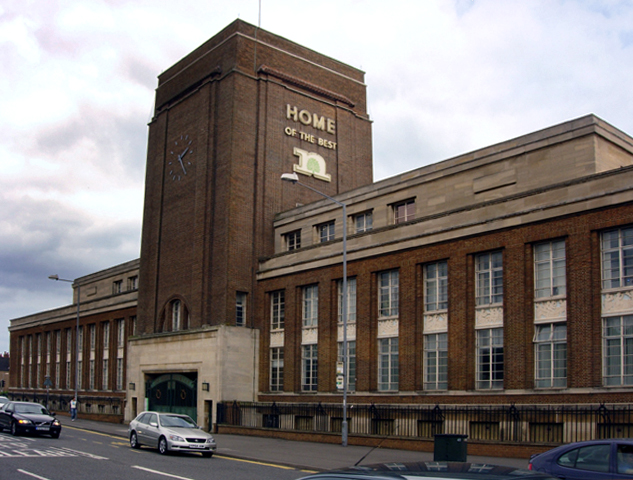
The Home Brewery office building

Founded in 1875 by John Robinson, the brewery was famous for its trademark Robin Hood logo on beermats. The brewery remained independent until 1986, when the family owners sold it (along with 450 public houses owned by the brewery) to Scottish & Newcastle for £123 million. Scottish & Newcastle gradually ran down production, by subcontracting its brewing to Mansfield Brewery, resulting in the eventual closure of the Daybrook building in 1996.

Dating from 1936, the current Home Brewery Company Ltd. building is now officially known as 'Sir John Robinson House' and houses more than 30,000 square feet (2,800 m^{2}) worth of county council offices. It is located at the junction between the A60 (Mansfield Road) and Sir John Robinson Way, (Note: Sir John Robinson Way is a road built after the redevelopment of the brewery site following its 1996 closure and named in honour of its founder.) and its architect was Thomas Cecil Howitt. The Grade II listed building's illuminated 'Home of the Best Ales' sign was altered to remove the word 'Ales' and to include the logo of Nottinghamshire County Council. The three-storey (Note: excluding the "very tall square tower" which provides a fourth storey, and including the "ancillary lower ground floor") building has an unusual ‘putti frieze’ by sculptor Charles L J Doman along the front wall which depicts groups of putti involved in the brewing of beer. The famed decorative ironwork gates and railings are contemporaneous and form part of the listed building.

Daybrook Baptist Church

The present-day building of Daybrook Baptist Church was completed in 1912 and is located on Mansfield Road.
