= List of schools in Walsall =

This is a list of schools in the Metropolitan Borough of Walsall, West Midlands, England.

== State-funded schools ==
=== Primary schools ===
- Abbey Primary School, Bloxwich
- All Saints National Academy, Bloxwich
- Alumwell Infant School, Walsall
- Alumwell Junior School, Walsall
- Barcroft Primary School, Willenhall
- Beacon Primary School, New Invention
- Bentley West Primary School, Bentley
- Birchills CE Community Academy, Walsall
- Blackwood School, Streetly
- Bloxwich Academy, Bloxwich
- Blue Coat CE Infant School, Walsall
- Blue Coat CE Junior School, Walsall
- Brownhills West Primary School, Brownhills
- Busill Jones Primary School, Bloxwich
- Butts Primary School, Walsall
- Caldmore Primary Academy, Walsall
- Castlefort JMI School, Walsall Wood
- Christ Church CE Primary School, Walsall
- Chuckery Primary School, Walsall
- Cooper and Jordan CE Primary School, Aldridge
- County Bridge Primary School, Bentley
- Croft Academy, Walsall
- Delves Infant School, Walsall
- Delves Junior School, Walsall
- Edgar Stammers Primary Academy, Walsall
- Elmore Green Primary School, Bloxwich
- Fibbersley Park Academy, Willenhall
- Field Road Academy, Blakenall Heath
- Goldsmith Primary Academy, Harden
- Greenfield Primary School, Shelfield
- Hillary Primary School, Pleck
- Holy Trinity CE Primary School, Brownhills
- Jubilee Academy Mossley, Bloxwich
- King Charles Primary School, Bentley
- Kings Hill Primary School, Darlaston
- Leamore Primary School, Walsall
- Leighswood School, Aldridge
- Lindens Primary School, Streetly
- Little Bloxwich CE Primary School, Bloxwich
- Lodge Farm Primary School, Willenhall
- Lower Farm Primary School, Bloxwich
- Manor Primary School, Streetly
- Meadow View JMI School, Great Barr
- Millfield Primary School, Brownhills
- Moorcroft Wood Primary School, Darlaston
- New Invention Infant School, New Invention
- New Invention Junior School, New Invention
- North Walsall Primary Academy, Walsall
- Old Church CE Primary School, Darlaston
- Palfrey Infant School, Walsall
- Palfrey Junior School, Walsall
- Park Hall Infant Academy, Walsall
- Park Hall Junior Academy, Walsall
- Pelsall Village School, Pelsall
- Pheasey Park Farm Primary School, Great Barr
- Pinfold Street Primary School, Darlaston
- Pool Hayes Primary School, Willenhall
- Radleys Primary School, Rushall
- Reedswood E-ACT Academy, Walsall
- Rivers Primary Academy, Blakenall Heath
- Rosedale CE Infant School, Short Heath
- Rushall Primary School, Rushall
- Ryders Hayes School, Pelsall
- St Anne's RC Primary School, Streetly
- St Bernadette's RC Primary School, Brownhills
- St Francis RC Primary School, Shelfield
- St Giles CE Primary School, Willenhall
- St James Primary School, Brownhills
- St John's CE Primary School, Walsall Wood
- St Joseph's RC Primary School, Darlaston
- St Mary of the Angels RC Primary School, Aldridge
- St Mary's The Mount RC Primary School, Walsall
- St Michael's CE Primary School, Pelsall
- St Patrick's RC Primary School, Walsall
- St Peter's RC Primary School, Bloxwich
- St Thomas of Canterbury RC Primary School, Walsall
- Salisbury Primary School, Darlaston
- Short Heath Junior School, Short Heath
- Sunshine Infant School, Walsall
- Walsall Wood School, Walsall Wood
- Watling Street Primary School, Brownhills
- Whetstone Field Primary School, Aldridge
- Whitehall Infant School, Walsall
- Whitehall Junior Community School, Walsall
- Woodlands Academy of Learning, Short Heath
- Woods Bank Academy, Darlaston

=== Non-selective secondary schools ===
- Aldridge School, Aldridge
- Barr Beacon School, Aldridge
- Bloxwich Academy, Bloxwich
- Blue Coat Church of England Academy, Walsall
- Brownhills Ormiston Academy, Brownhills
- Grace Academy, Darlaston
- Joseph Leckie Academy, Walsall
- Ormiston Shelfield Community Academy, Pelsall
- Pool Hayes Academy, Willenhall
- St Francis of Assisi Catholic College, Aldridge
- St Thomas More Catholic School, Willenhall
- Shire Oak Academy, Walsall Wood
- The Streetly Academy, Streetly
- Walsall Academy, Bloxwich
- Walsall Studio School, Walsall
- West Walsall E-ACT Academy, Walsall
- Willenhall E-ACT Academy, Willenhall

=== Grammar schools ===
- Queen Mary's Grammar School, Walsall
- Queen Mary's High School, Walsall

=== Special and alternative schools ===
- Castle School, Walsall
- Elmwood School, Rushall
- The Jane Lane School, Bentley
- The Ladder School, Walsall
- Mary Elliot Academy, Walsall
- New Leaf Centre, Willenhall
- Oakwood School, Walsall Wood
- Old Hall School, Walsall
- Phoenix Academy, Walsall
- Shepwell Short Stay School, Willenhall
- WV2 Education, Willenhall

=== Further education ===
- Walsall College

== Independent schools ==
=== Primary and preparatory schools ===
- Mayfield Preparatory School, Walsall

=== Senior and all-through schools ===
- Abu Bakr Boys School, Walsall
- Abu Bakr Girls School, Walsall
- Emmanuel School, Walsall
- Hydesville Tower School, Walsall

=== Special and alternative schools ===
- Chase House School, Brownhills
- Cherry Tree School, Walsall
- West Midlands Education and Skills, Walsall
