= E-ACT =

British educational trust

- Formation: 6 March 2008; 18 years ago
- Type: Multi-academy trust
- Headquarters: The Orangery
- Location(s): 28 Headlands; Kettering; NN15 7HP
- Services: Education
- Chair of trustees: Jim Knight
- CEO: Tom Campbell
- Staff: 2,500
- Website: www.e-act.org.uk
- Formerly called: Edutrust Academies Charitable Trust (2008–2010); Edutrust Academies Trust (Mar–May 2008)

E-ACT is a multi-academy trust responsible for 38 academies in England. Over 93% are now rated as “Good” or better by Ofsted.

As an academy trust, it is an exempt charity regulated by the Department for Education.

== Recent Success ==
In August 2019, David Moran stepped down as CEO. When he joined the organisation in 2013, 17% of E-ACT's academies were rated good or outstanding by Ofsted. By the time of his departure, that figure was over 70%. E-ACT's Board of Trustees announced Deputy CEO Jane Millward as David's successor.

The trust continued to improve during her tenure. After 3 years in the role Milward stepped down as CEO at the end of 2022, and was replaced by Tom Campbell, previously education director at Greenwood Academies Trust, in January 2023.

As of August 2023, the percentage of academies rated either Good or Outstanding by Ofsted stands at 93%, with 100% rated as either Good or Outstanding for leadership and management.

Under the leadership of Campbell, the trust has refreshed its 'Opening Minds, Opening Doors' strategy that focuses on ensuring that coming from a disadvantaged background does not determine your future, by creating the conditions where children, young people and staff can thrive.

In June 2023 E-ACT was awarded MAT of the Year at the MAT Excellence Awards.

In March 2023, it was announced that E-ACT Blackley Academy has been nominated for the Community Engagement Award and E-ACT Nechells Academy for EYFS Setting of the Year.

In November 2022, E-ACT Bourne End Academy was recognised as the top secondary comprehensive school in Buckinghamshire, according to performance data from the Department for Education. The academy was rated as Good with Outstanding for effectiveness of its leadership and management by Ofsted, and is currently oversubscribed.

In 2022, E-ACT Nechells Academy was shortlisted for the Community Engagement Initiative category, and in 2021, Emma Smythe at E-ACT Parkwood Academy was nominated for Classroom Support Assistant of the Year and E-ACT Nechells Academy for the Wellbeing and Mental Health Award.

In 2020, E-ACT Heartlands Academy was named both Secondary School of the Year and Overall School of the Year at the awards.

E-ACT has often led the way in the sector on mental health provision; in 2017, the trust introduced a mental health first aid programme, aiming to train every member of staff to understand and recognise the early warning signs of mental health problems in pupils, and also announced plans to pioneer a pupil-led mental health curriculum in all its schools. By 2020, more than 1,000 E-ACT staff were trained in youth and adult mental health first aid.

== History ==
Until 2009 the Chief Executive of the Trust was Ian Comfort, who left his post alleging whistleblowing concerns, whilst the trust claimed "poor performance" issues. In March 2013 an audit by the UK Department for Education concluded that "boundaries between E-ACT and its subsidiary, E-ACT Enterprises Ltd (EEL) are blurred" (page 3), "activities undertaken by the subsidiary have been paid for with public funds and so appear irregular" (page 3), and "there has been a flow of public monies into EEL that cannot be said to directly benefit teaching and learning in E-ACT academies" (pages 12–13).

A 2011 Guardian article reported that in 2010 its director-general Sir Bruce Liddington had a salary package of £280,017. Sir Bruce Liddington resigned in 2013 after E-ACT received an official warning from the government regarding "financial mismanagement". The investigation report into E-ACT found that internal financial controls were weak, there was a culture of extravagant expenses, governance procedures were unusual, and that payments were made to trustees in a manner unusual for the charitable sector.

In 2014, the Department for Education removed E-ACT as sponsor from 10 academies after Ofsted inspectors raised serious concerns, noting extravagant spending on expenses and £393,000 of spending with "procedural irregularities" including on unapproved consultancy fees.

E-ACT Enterprises LTD was dissolved shortly after Sir Bruce Liddington's departure. In addition, E-ACT has made considerable changes to its previous administration practices (including reducing back office costs by 73%) as audited in its public accounts and the salary of its subsequent CEO, David Moran, reduced significantly.

In January 2016, E-ACT moved to a centralised process for monitoring standards. There is now a single central governing body covering all academies in the group across the country. Ambassadorial Advisory Groups were introduced at a local academy level.

In 2017, E-ACT introduced a mental health first aid programme, aiming to train every member of staff to understand and recognise the early warning signs of mental health problems in pupils. E-ACT also announced plans to pioneer a pupil-led mental health curriculum in all its schools.

== Academies ==
=== Primary ===
- E-ACT Blackley Academy
- Badock's Wood E-ACT Academy
- Braintcroft E-ACT Academy
- Chalfont Valley E-ACT Primary Academy
- Denham Green E-ACT Primary Academy
- Greenfield E-ACT Primary Academy
- Hareclive Academy
- Ilminster Avenue E-ACT Academy
- Mansfield Green E-ACT Primary Academy
- Merritts Brook E-ACT Primary Academy
- Nechells Primary E-ACT Academy
- Pathways E-ACT Academy
- Perry Court E-ACT Academy
- Reedswood E-ACT Primary Academy
- St Ursula's E-ACT Academy
- Ventures Academy Saint Annes E-ACT Primary Academy

=== Secondary ===
- Bourne End Academy
- City Heights E-ACT Academy
- Heartlands Academy
- North Birmingham Academy
- The Oldham Academy North
- The Parker E-ACT Academy
- Parkwood E-ACT Academy
- E-ACT Crest Academy
- E-ACT Royton and Crompton Academy
- Shenley Academy
- West Walsall E-ACT Academy
- Willenhall E-ACT Academy
- E-ACT Ousedale Academy (Newport Pagnell)
- E-ACT Ousedale Academy (Olney)

=== All-through ===
- Danetre and Southbrook Learning Village

== Academies previously sponsored ==
=== Primary ===
- Aldborough E-ACT Free School (to 31 May 2014) (now sponsored by Loxford School Trust), with effect from 1 June 2014. The school is now known as Aldborough Primary School.
- Hartsbrook E-ACT Free School (to 31 August 2014) (now sponsored by Lion Education Trust), with effect from 1 September 2014. The school was closed on 31 August 2014, and re-opened on 1 September 2014 as Brook House Primary School.

=== Secondary ===
- E-ACT Leeds East Academy (to 31 August 2014) (now sponsored by White Rose Academies Trust), with effect from 1 September 2014. The school is now known as Leeds East Academy.
- Leeds West Academy (to 31 August 2014) (now sponsored by White Rose Academies Trust), with effect from 1 September 2014.
- Forest E-ACT Academy (to 28 February 2015), now sponsored by SGS Academy Trust, with effect from 1 March 2015. The school is now known as The Forest High School.
- Sherwood E-ACT Academy (to 31 March 2015) (now sponsored by Redhill Academy Trust). E-ACT was the sponsor until the end of March 2015. The school was then known as Sherwood Academy. The Redhill Academy Trust sponsored the school until Summer 2016, when the school site closed permanently.
- The Purston E-ACT Academy (to 31 August 2014) (now sponsored by The Rodillian Multi-Academy Trust), with effect from 1 September 2014. The school is now known as The Featherstone Academy.
- Trent Valley Academy (to 31 May 2014) (now sponsored by The Lincoln College Group), with effect from 1 June 2014. The school is now known as The Gainsborough Academy.
- The Winsford E-ACT Academy (to 31 August 2014) (now sponsored by The Fallibroome Multi-Academy Trust), with effect from 1 September 2014. The school is now known as The Winsford Academy.

=== All-through ===
- Dartmouth Academy (to 31 August 2014) (now sponsored by Kingsbridge Academy Trust), with effect from 1 September 2014. Nick Hindmarsh, Principal has said that: "The name of the trust will change following a consultation exercise across the schools’ communities".
