= The Carlton Academy =

Secondary school in Nottingham outskirts

Location
- Coningswath Road; Carlton, Nottinghamshire, NG4 3SH; England; 52°58′31″N 1°06′06″W

Information
- Type: Academy
- Established: 2011
- Trust: Redhill Academy Trust
- Department for Education URN: 137085 Tables
- Principal: Richard Pierpoint (2013–Present)
- Head teacher: Gary Hillyard
- Gender: Mixed
- Age: 11 to 18
- Enrolment: 1,245
- Houses: Cavendish, Carnarvon, Hollinsclough, Grove, Hutchinson, Messent
- Colours: Maroon, black and blue
- Website: The Carlton Academy

The Carlton Academy is a secondary school in Nottinghamshire, previously known as The Wheldon School and Sports Academy. The school is sponsored by the Redhill Academy Trust, and was judged as being a good school by OFSTED in 2013. This was reaffirmed in 2017 and 2022.

The academy has 1,245 students of which 167 are enrolled in sixth form as of November 2022. In September 2014, students from the local Sherwood E-Act Academy which was to close, were moved to the academy. Students in Years 7 and 8 at Sherwood would not have been able to continue their education there and were integrated into Carlton.

== Academics ==
Virtually all maintained schools and academies follow the National Curriculum, and are inspected by Ofsted on how well they succeed in delivering a 'broad and balanced curriculum'. Schools endeavour to get all students to achieve the English Baccalaureate qualification – this must include core subjects a modern or ancient foreign language, and either History or Geography.

The school operates a two-year, Key Stage 3 where all the core National Curriculum subjects are taught. Year 7 and Year 8 study core subjects: English, Mathematics, Science with PE, and Philosophy, Religion & Ethics. The following subjects are taught: Modern Languages, History, Geography, Art, Design Technology, Drama, Music and Computing. Teaching can be mixed ability or setted.

The academy runs a 3-year Key Stage 4 to allow students more time to study their preferred subjects to examination level. English, Mathematics, Science, PE, and Philosophy, Religion & Ethics are continued, with four options to form an individual pathway for each student.

Students all sit the Philosophy, Religion & Ethics GCSE and one option in Year 10- freeing time to consolidate maths and English in Year 11. This is known as the Year 10 Option, the subjects offered include GCSE Dramam BTEC Sport, Digital Information Technology, Creative Media Production, GCSE Photography, Child Development & Care, Hospitalityand Catering, GCSE Design & Technology, and Enterprise.

The second option is choosing between History, Geography, Spanish and French. They then can select two subjects from a pool. The pool contains: Triple Science, Geography, History, French, Spanish, PE, Sport, Fine Art, Art Graphics, Photography, Business Studies, Computer Science, Digital IT, eCreative Media, Engineering, Food and Nutrition, Hospitality and Catering, Design &Technology, Sociology, Psychology, Child Development & Care, Drama, and Music.

The sixth form, Key Stage 5, offers A levels in Mathematics, Further Mathematics, Physics, Biology, Chemistry, Computer Science, Design Technology, English Language, English Literature, Art Photography, Fine Art, Media Studies, Graphic Communication, Music, Drama, Geography, History, Politics, Psychology, Sociology, French and Spanish. Level 3 BTECs in Applied Science, Business, Health & Social Care, IT, Sports. With Physical Education, Philosophy, Religion and Ethics (PRE).

== Notable alumnus ==
- TommyInnit, YouTuber and comedian
