= Trent School =

Trent School may refer to:

- Trent C of E Primary School, a primary school in Cockfosters, London, United Kingdom
- Trent Valley Academy, a secondary school in Gainsborough, Lincolnshire, United Kingdom
- Trent College, an independent school in Long Eaton, Derbyshire, United Kingdom
- Trent Independent School District, United States
