= Laura Carter =

Laura Carter may refer to:

- Laura Carter (musician), American multi-instrumentalist musician
- Laura Carter (actress) (born 1985), English actress and model
