= Leeds West Academy =

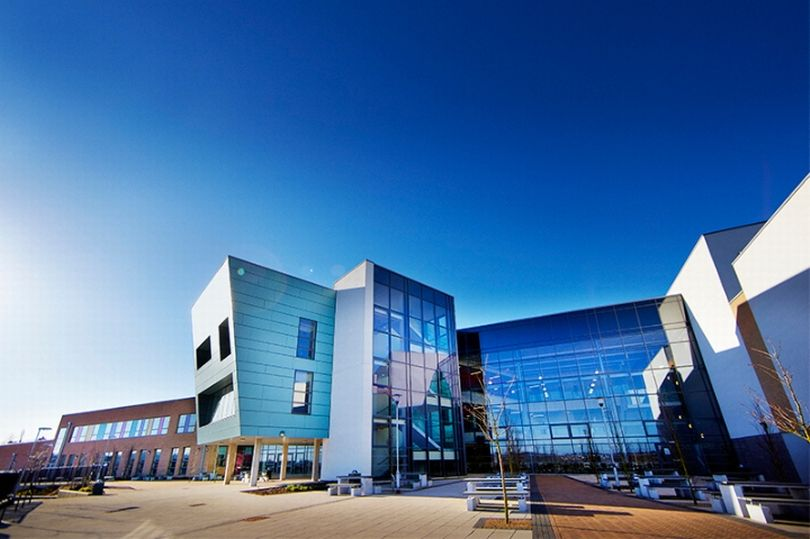
- Leeds West Academy Building

Location
- Intake Lane; Rodley, Leeds, LS13 1DQ; England; 53°48′52″N 1°39′12″W

Information
- Type: Academy
- Established: September 2009
- Trust: White Rose Academies Trust
- Department for Education URN: 135935 Tables
- Ofsted: Reports
- Executive Principal: Christian Wilcocks
- Principal: Dan Whieldon
- Gender: Coeducational
- Age: 11 to 16
- Enrolment: 1364
- Website: www.leedswestacademy.org.uk

Leeds West Academy is a secondary school with academy status in Rodley, Leeds, West Yorkshire, England.

== History ==
Leeds West Academy was founded in September 2009, and replaced Intake High School which was on the same site and had the same head teacher. The academy moved into new buildings on the site in September 2011. In 2019, the school formally closed its Sixth Form provision.

== Links with other schools ==
The school has a partnership with Leeds East Academy and Leeds City Academy. The schools were previously sponsored by E-ACT, however in 2014 the schools joined the White Rose Academies Trust with Leeds City College as their sponsor. Leeds West Academy specialises in performing arts (following Intake High School's specialism in this area) and English.

== Academic results ==
Its 2012 Ofsted report graded Leeds West Academy as "good"; however it found behaviour and safety of pupils only to be "adequate".

Its 2019 Ofsted report graded Leeds West Academy as "good", with " outstanding features".

== Appointment of new Executive Principal & CEO ==
In May 2016 Andrew Whitaker was appointed as the new Executive Principal of White Rose Academies, replacing the previous Executive Principal/CEO, Annette Hall, with effect from September 2016. Andrew Whitaker was formerly headteacher at Todmorden High School and steered the school from an Ofsted rating of 'requires improvement' (2013) to 'good with outstanding features' (2015).

In July 2020 Andrew Whitaker was appointed CEO of White Rose Academies, leaving Christian Wilcocks as Executive Principal of the White Rose Academies Trust. Christian Wilcocks was formerly the Principal of Leeds West Academy, changing its Ofsted ratings from 'requires improvement' in late 2017, to "good", with "outstanding features"

As of July 2020, former vice principal, Dan Whieldon has replaced Christian Wilcocks as Principal for Leeds West Academy.

== Academy popularity and extension ==
Leeds West Academy has grown in popularity in recent years and the demand for places has led to an increase in pupil admission numbers and a new £5 million extension to the site which is due for completion in summer 2022.

== Notable former pupils ==
- Mel B, singer
- Andrew-Lee Potts, actor
- Chris Fountain, actor
- Carolynne Poole, singer
- Angela Griffin, actress
- Tommy Taylor, Professional Wrestler
- Jack P. Shepherd, actor
- Natalie Anderson, actress
- Jake Thackray, former teacher. English singer, songwriter and journalist
- Billy George, gymnast
- Laura Carter, actress and Big Brother 2016 contestant
- Darshan Singh Bhuller, choreographer, director, and filmmaker
- Vinette Robinson, actor (Sherlock, Doctor Who) (attended Intake High School)
