= Carlton, Nottinghamshire =

Town in Nottinghamshire, England

Coordinates: 52°58′01″N 1°05′17″W

Carlton
- Town and Suburb
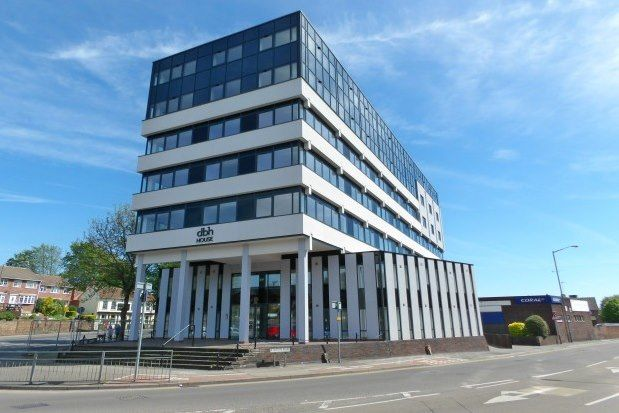
- DBH House, Carlton Square

- Location within Nottinghamshire
- Population: 6,881 (Ward. 2011)
- Demonym: Carltoner
- OS grid reference: SK 61244 41494
- District: Borough of Gedling
- Shire county: Nottinghamshire
- Region: East Midlands
- Country: England
- Sovereign state: United Kingdom
- Post town: NOTTINGHAM
- Postcode district: NG4
- Dialling code: 0115
- Police: Nottinghamshire
- Fire: Nottinghamshire
- Ambulance: East Midlands
- UK Parliament: Gedling

Carlton is a town in the Borough of Gedling, Nottinghamshire, England. It is to the east of Nottingham. The population at the 2011 Census was 6,881. It was an urban district until 1974, whose wards (Carlton Hill, Carlton, Cavendish, Colwick, Gedling, Netherfield, Phoenix and Porchester) had a population of 53,555 according to the 2021–2022 United Kingdom censuses. Owing to the growth of residential, commercial and industrial in the wider Gedling borough, City of Nottingham, Broxtowe, Rushcliffe and Ashfield, as well as the Amber Valley and Erewash in Derbyshire which have become quite urban around Nottingham, Carlton and Gedling, as well as Netherfield form a contiguous urban area.

== History ==
In the Domesday Book of 1086, Carlton is referred to as Carentune. The town grew significantly in the 19th century, largely due to the textile industry, which was a significant driver of its development.

In the early days, Carlton was a small township within the manor and parish of Gedling, home to farmers and framework knitters. Its strategic location on the edge of Nottingham and proximity to railways led to a steady increase in the population from the 1840s.

By 1850, Carlton had evolved into a suburban settlement, with its own housing, churches, schools, and other facilities.

The establishment of the Carlton Urban District Council in 1849 marked a significant milestone, recognising the township's new status.

The completion of the tram route from Nottingham to Carlton in 1914 further cemented its role as a residential area for people working in Nottingham.

Until 1950, Carlton was part of the Rushcliffe parliamentary constituency. It had its own eponymous constituency from 1950 until 1983, since when it has been in the Gedling constituency.

In 1974, Carlton Urban District became part of the newly formed Borough of Gedling. Today, Carlton is primarily a residential area, reflecting its historical growth and development.

== Geography ==
Carlton is situated in the Borough of Gedling, Nottinghamshire, England. It lies to the east of Nottingham and is part of the East Midlands region. The town is bordered by several other towns, including Bakersfield, Colwick, Gedling, Mapperley, Netherfield, Snienton, and St Ann's.

Carlton lies within a valley, which has influenced its development, layout, and architecture. The town has two distinct sides: the Northern side, predominantly built during the Industrial Revolution and early 1900s, and the Southern side, which was primarily developed in the 1930s, 1940s, and 1950s.

Carlton is located near to the River Trent. The town has an NG4 postcode, and is well-connected to Nottingham and other nearby areas through a network of road connections, such as the B686, as well as frequent public transport services.

The town's geography has played a significant role in its development, with its proximity to Nottingham making it a desirable residential area for those working within the city.

== Community ==
The main shopping street is Carlton Hill, which has several shopping chains and smaller shops such as newsagents, chemists, and grocers. Carlton Square, the traditional centre of Carlton is today a shopping centre.

There are numerous areas of grass for children to play on, as the roads tend to be quite busy. The King George V Recreation Ground on Standhill Road is on the site of the former Standhill Brickworks, and includes a large playing field, a skatepark, and a children's playground. Carlton has two leisure centres: Richard Herrod Centre (an indoor bowling centre) on Foxhill Road and Carlton Forum (a swimming pool, gym and all-weather pitches) on Coningswath Road, off Cavendish Road.

Carlton Laundry on Primrose Street is a Grade II listed building by Watson Fothergill. It was built in 1899 as a laundry and dye works.

== Transport ==
=== Rail ===
Carlton railway station is on the Nottingham to Lincoln Line.

=== Buses ===
Nottingham City Transport

- 39: Nottingham, Thorneywood, Carlton Valley
- 25: Nottingham, Carlton Hill, Westdale Lane, Mapperley, Arnold
- 25B: Nottingham, Carlton Hill, Westdale Lane, Mapperley
- 26: Nottingham, Carlton Hill, Gedling, Burton Joyce, Lowdham, Southwell
- 27: Nottingham, Carlton Hill, Carlton
- 45: Nottingham, Colwick, Victoria Retail Park, Gedling, Carlton, Carlton Hill, Bakersfield

Nottingham Minibus & Coaches

- 773: Victoria Retail Park, Netherfield, Carlton Square, Carlton Tesco, Bakersfield
- 774: Victoria Retail Park, Netherfield, Cavendish Road, Gedling, Carlton Square, Netherfield, Victoria Retail Park.
- N73: Mapperley, Westdale Lane, Carlton Valley, Netherfield, Victoria Retail Park.

== Education ==
Local schools are Parkdale School, Carlton le Willows Academy, Sherwood Academy and The Carlton Academy.

Carlton Central Primary School was founded in the late 19th century but after a piece of masonry fell one night from the roof into the school assembly area in the 1960s, the school was demolished and the council house and the current Carlton Square were built in its place. A new school had been built on Foxhill Road/Carlton Hill and Carlton Central Primary School was relocated there. The new school had originally been intended to replace the deteriorating St. Paul's School on Carlton Hill. St Paul's was closed in 1983 after many years and attempts to find a new site and financing for a new building were unsuccessful. Carlton Central Primary School is not the only primary school in Carlton. Amongst others, Porchester Junior School (which has recently been extended) is situated at the top of Standhill Road, while Carlton Standhill Infants School is at the opposite end of Standhill Road.

Carlton has a number of pre schools & nurseries including Foxy Creeks Pre School (based in the Richard Herrod Centre, Foxhill Road), Good Foundations Day Nursery on Station Road and Little Owls Day Nursery on First Avenue.

Carlton is home to the Midlands Academy of Dance and Drama (also known as MADD). It is one of the UK's top musical theatre colleges.

== Religion ==
St. Paul's Church, Carlton-in-the-Willows was built by Henry Herbert, 4th Earl of Carnarvon and consecrated in 1885. Located at the bottom of Carlton Hill, off Church Street, it is built in the style of a Roman Basilica and resides in the diocese of Southwell and Nottingham. Carlton Pentecostal Church is located opposite the fire station on Station Road.

== Sport ==
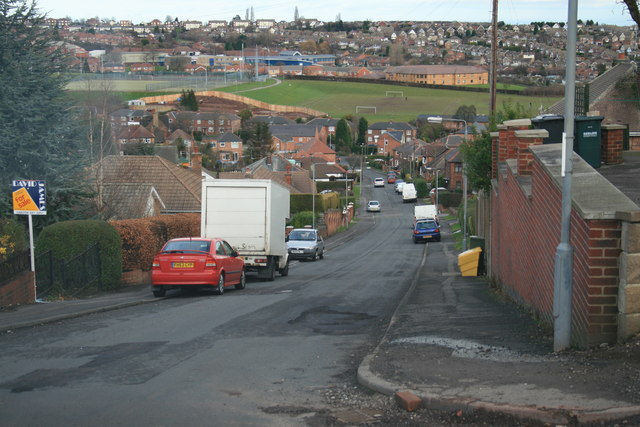
Carlton Forum from Highfield Drive

Carlton Town Football Club were champions of Northern Counties East Football League Division One in the 2005–2006 season. Carlton Forum is a large leisure centre on Coningswath Road.

== Notable people ==
- Richard Beckinsale, actor and father of actresses Samantha Beckinsale and Kate Beckinsale, was born in Carlton in 1947.
- Sam Beeton, singer/songwriter was born in Carlton in 1988.
