= The Forest High School, Cinderford =

SGS Forest High School
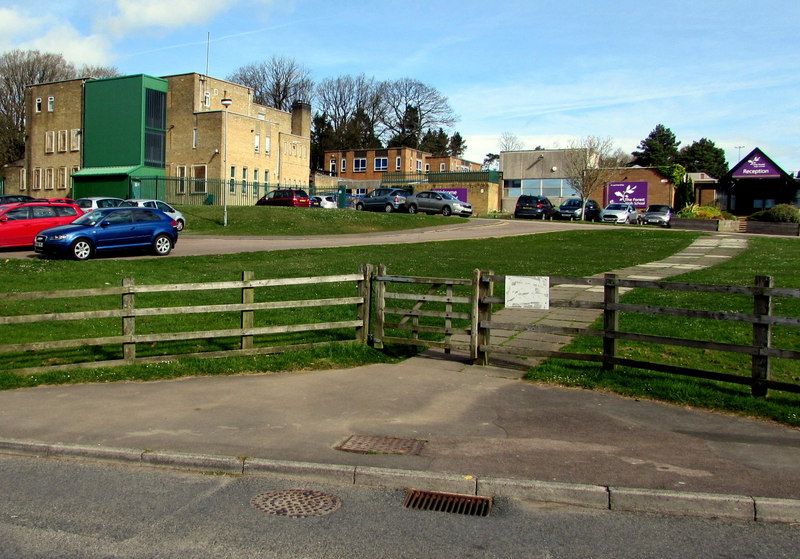

Location
- Causeway Road; Cinderford, Gloucestershire, GL14 2AZ; England
- Coordinates: 51.829°N 2.49331°W

Information
- Type: Academy
- Trust: SGS Academy Trust (2015–); Redhill Academy Trust (2014–15); E-ACT (until 2014)
- Department for Education URN: 138496 Tables
- Ofsted: Reports
- Head teacher: Nicola Mooney
- Gender: Coeducational
- Age: 11 to 16
- Houses: Beechenhurst Clearwell Symonds Yat
- Website: http://www.foresthigh.org.uk/

SGS Forest High School is a coeducational secondary school with academy status, located in Cinderford in the English county of Gloucestershire.

The school was established as Double View Secondary Modern School on Woodville Road in Cinderford, but expanded to the current site on Causeway Road in the early-mid-1970s. The school continued to operate over both sites until 1979 when the Woodville Road site closed. Double View was renamed Heywood School in the mid-1980s, and later Heywood Community School in the early 1990s.

Heywood Community School became a foundation school in the 2000s, and was administered by Gloucestershire County Council until September 2012 when the school converted to academy status. The school was renamed Forest E-ACT Academy, and was sponsored by E-ACT. However in 2014 the E-Act announced that they would be withdrawing as sponsor, and that the school would join the Redhill Academy Trust and be renamed Forest Academy. However, in 2015 the new academy sponsor was named as the SGS Schools Trust, and the school was renamed SGS Forest High School.

SGS Forest High School was placed into special measures by Ofsted in 2022. In 2024, it was re-inspected and judged to require improvement.

As of September 2024, Nicola Mooney is the headteacher, following the appointment of Alan Dane as chief executive officer of SGS Academy Trust.
