= Palfrey, West Midlands =

Coordinates: 52.5714°N 1.9929°W

Palfrey
- Location within the West Midlands
- Population: 17,398 (2018 census)
- OS grid reference: SP 01426 96989
- Metropolitan borough: Walsall
- Metropolitan county: West Midlands
- Region: West Midlands
- Country: England
- Sovereign state: United Kingdom
- Post town: WALSALL
- Postcode district: WS1, WS5
- Police: West Midlands
- Fire: West Midlands
- Ambulance: West Midlands

Palfrey is a neighbourhood in the Metropolitan Borough of Walsall, in the West Midlands. It covers 3.68 sq km, which accounts for 3.5% of the area of the Walsall borough.

== Etymology ==
The word palfrey refers to a small riding horse which is particularly suitable for women. It is possible that Palfrey's name originated from the keeping of such horses on the land which has since become Palfrey.

== Crime ==
From January to December 2018, Palfrey had a crime rate of 86.3 per 1000 people, and a serious acquisitive crime rate of 19.6 per 1000 people. Both rates were lower than the average in the Walsall borough. 'Violence without injury' was the most prolific type of crime in 2018.

== Economy ==
In the 2019 Index of Multiple Deprivation (IMD) Palfrey was ranked 2,773 out of 32,844 in England, where 1 was the most deprived and 32,844 the least. This is broken down further by income; employment; education, skills; health; barriers to housing and services; the living environment; and crime (England).

In the 2011 census, 64.9% of working age people in Palfrey ward were economically active (compared to the 76.8% national average) and 26.5% had no formal qualifications (compared to the 15.0% national average).

== Education ==
The schools in the ward include: Palfrey Infants and Junior, Fullbrook Nursery, Joseph Leckie Academy, Whitehall Junior and Infants, and Delves Junior and Infants.

== Population ==
In the Palfrey ward there are 5407 households, with 29.4% owning with a mortgage or loan and 24.1% being socially rented, as of the 2011 census.

Year	Population	Male Residents	Female Residents	Population Density (per sq km)
2018	17,398	49%	51%	4700
2011	16,532	49%	51%	4500
2001	14,596	48%	52%	4000

== Notable features ==
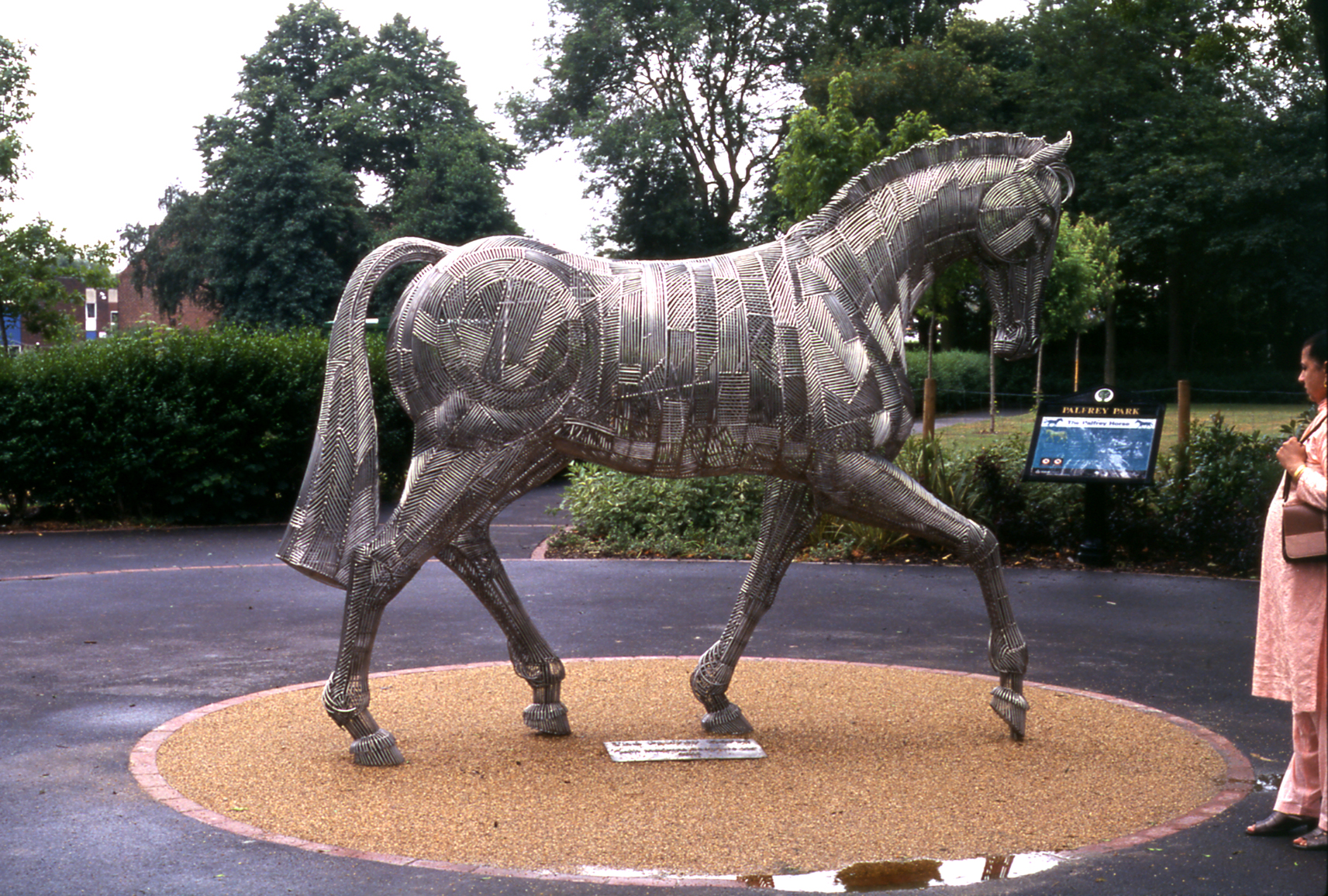
Palfrey horse sculpture, fabricated in stainless steel by John McKenna

Palfrey Park is a significant local landmark, and is one of Walsall Council’s flagship green spaces. It was the first park in the borough to secure a national Green Flag Award, winning the accolade in 2007 and again in 2008, 2009 and 2010. The park is located within walking distance of Palfrey Town Centre and its Broadway West entrance is located off Broadway West (A4148 Walsall ring road). The park has a simple reverse L–shaped layout and is an intimate open space of approximately 6.48 hectares ranging from a formal historical layout in the north dominated by the reconstructed historical bandstand and Palfrey horse sculpture, created in stainless steel by the sculptor John McKenna ARBS, to the play and sports facilities at the centre core of the park, large amenity grass area to the south and informal nature conservation area in the south west corner of the park.

Palfrey is home to Walsall's main mosques: Abu Bakr, Al Farooq and Aisha, Shah Jalal Mosques, Jalalia Sunni Jami Masjid, and Masjid E Usman. Walsall has a significant Muslim population. In the 2011 census 8.2% of residents viewed themselves as Muslim, above the UK average of 4.4%.
