= Danetre and Southbrook Learning Village =

DSLV E-ACT Academy

Location
- Hawke Road; Daventry, Northamptonshire, NN11 4LJ; England; 52.2569°N 1.1487°W

Information
- Type: Academy
- Motto: Nurture. Aspire. Achieve.
- Local authority: West Northamptonshire
- Trust: E-ACT
- Department for Education URN: 138073 Tables
- Ofsted: Reports
- Headteachers: Rebecca Waterson (secondary phase); Hannah Rowe (primary phase)
- Staff: 106
- Gender: Mixed
- Age: 3 to 19
- Enrolment: 916
- Colours: Burgundy, silver and black
- Website: dslvacademy.e-act.org.uk

DSLV E-ACT Academy (Danetre and Southbrook Learning Village) is an academy school and sixth form for pupils aged 3 to 19, located in Daventry, Northamptonshire, England.

DSLV E-ACT Academy was formed from the merger of Danetre School, Southbrook Infant and Nursery School and Southbrook Junior School in September 2012. The academy is 1 of 28 sponsored by E-ACT.

The overrall outcome of the most recent inspection, as of July 2026, on the 26 April 2022 was: Good
