= Shire Oak Academy =

Location
- Brownhills, West Midlands; England; 52.6358°N 1.9206°W

Information
- Type: Academy
- Department for Education URN: 136620 Tables
- Head teacher: Matthew Everett
- Gender: Mixed
- Age: 11 to 18
- Website: http://www.shireoakacademy.co.uk/

The Shire Oak Academy is a coeducational academy school (age range 11–18) in Walsall Wood, West Midlands, England.

Before converting to academy status in 2011, the school was a foundation school, named Shire Oak School (A Science College). Prior to this, Shire Oak School was a comprehensive school that came about from the merger in 1970 of Shire Oak Grammar School (formed 1961) with Walsall Wood Secondary Modern School, which had relocated to new buildings next to the grammar school in 1966.

== Features ==
It is one of two secondary schools providing services for the people of Walsall Wood, it also provides schooling for the Aldridge and Brownhills areas.

== Notable former pupils and staff ==
- Steve Biggins - footballer
- Craig Thomas - novelist

== See also ==
- List of schools in Walsall
