= The Parker E-ACT Academy =

Coordinates: 52.2651°N 1.1643°W

The Parker Academy

Location
- Ashby Road; Daventry, Northamptonshire, NN11 0QF; England

Information
- Type: Academy
- Motto: Work Hard, Stay Humble, Dream Big
- Local authority: West Northamptonshire
- Department for Education URN: 138235 Tables
- Ofsted: Reports
- Gender: Mixed
- Age: 11 to 18
- Enrolment: 706
- Colour: Purple
- Website: https://theparkeracademy.e-act.org.uk/

The Parker E-ACT Academy (formerly William Parker School) is an 11–18 secondary school with academy status situated in Daventry, Northamptonshire, England. The school is sponsored by E-ACT, and there are approximately 2000 students on the campus which is also shared with Falconer's Hill Infant
