= Ian Comfort =

British educator and lawyer

- Education: Open University Mathematics, University of Law, Postgraduate Diploma in Law, City, University of London Inns of Court Law School, Postgraduate Diploma in Professional Legal Skills, Plymouth University, Master of Laws, Barrister of the Inner Temple
- Occupations: Lawyer and Educationalist

Ian Comfort is a British educator and lawyer. He began his career as a maths teacher and youth worker. He progressed to become Director of Community Education for the Royal Borough of Kensington and Chelsea and then Chief Education Officer for the City of London, where he became actively involved in the Government's Academy programme. He moved from the City in 2006 to become the chief operating officer for Ark Schools a newly created academy trust. In 2008, he was appointed as the first chief executive of the newly formed Edutrust, a Multi-academy Trust chaired by Lord Amir Bhatia, which was renamed as E-ACT in 2010.

In 2012, Ian Comfort became the Group Secretary and General Counsel of Academies Enterprise Trust, which at that time was the largest Multi-Academy Trust in England with over 36,000 pupils. He took over as CEO in Sept 2013.

In announcing his intention to step down as CEO in 2017, Schools Week reported that during his tenure as group chief executive, the percentage of good or outstanding academies in the trust has increased from less than 26 per cent to 68 per cent, In primary schools, the number of good or outstanding academies has increased from 22 per cent to 84 per cent, with over 8,000 more children now receiving a good education. Research published by the Education Policy Institute in July 2016, confirmed that the trust was in the top 10 per cent of academy trusts nationally for primary education and performing significantly above average in all areas.

In 2017, Ian Comfort was appointed as chair of Sutton Education Services, a company set up by the London Borough of Sutton to manage its education service. The company changed its name to Cognus later in 2017. In 2017, Ian Comfort was appointed to the board of the Middlesex Learning Partnership, a multi- academy trust, and took up the role of chair in 2018. In February 2019, Ian Comfort was appointed to chair the Corporation of Ealing, Hammersmith and West London College.

== Legal practice ==
Ian Comfort was appointed as a justice of the peace in 1984 and is a presiding justice in West London. He qualified as Barrister in 2005 and is called to the bar of the Inner Temple. He chairs a number of tribunals for professional regulation including the Investigating Committee of the Nursing and Midwifery Council, the Health and Care Professions Tribunal, the Medical Practitioners Tribunal and the Taxation Disciplinary Board. In 2019, he was appointed by Her Majesty the Queen as a Commissioner for the Criminal Cases Review Commission.

== Charity, Arts and Community ==
Ian Comfort has been a trustee and chair of the award-winning Ebony Steelband Trust since 2004. In 2005, Ebony Steelband was awarded the Queens Award for Voluntary Service. Ebony Steelband holds the record of being 22 times winner of the UK National Steelband Panorama competition at Notting Hill Carnival. In 2017, Ebony Steelband played at the Grenfell memorial service at St Paul's Cathederal.

Ian Comfort has been a trustee and chair of the Carnival Village Trust since 2008. The Trust is a National Portfolio Organisation for Arts Council England and London's development agency for Carnival Arts. Alongside its regional and national remit to develop Carnival Arts, it is responsible for two venues: the Tabernacle in North Kensington and the Yaa Centre in North Westminster.

In 2018, Carnival Village Trust set up a subsidiary company, Notting Hill Carnival Ltd (NHC), to take over responsibility for managing the world renowned Notting Hill Carnival, and appointed Ian Comfort as chair. In 2019, the Metropolitan Police Commissioner praised the new Carnival organisers for providing a safe and successful event. The Carnival is the largest street festival in Europe and attracts over 2 million people. In May 2020, in response to the COVID-19 pandemic and in order to protect the public, NHC took the decision to take Carnival off the streets. With the support of a range of sponsors including Letsgodo, Samsung and Spotify, venues including t he Royal Albert Hall and Abbey Road Studios and funding from the Royal Borough of Kensington and Chelsea, the City of Westminster and the Mayor of London all aspects of the Carnival were streamed over the August bank holiday Carnival weekend generating over 7 million views.
