= Leeds East Academy =

Academy in Seacroft, Leeds, West Yorkshire, England

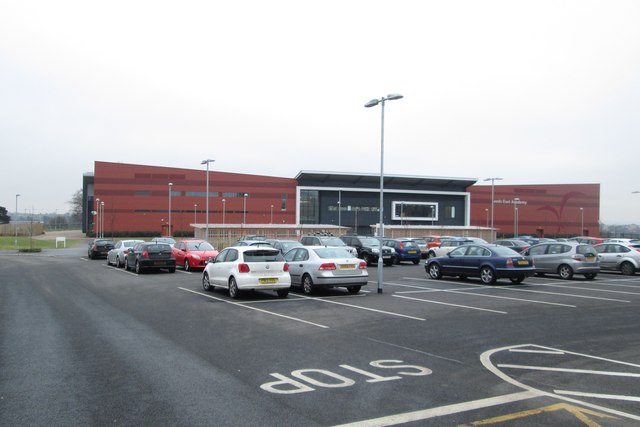
- The school seen from Foundry Mill Street

Location
- South Parkway; Seacroft; Leeds, West Yorkshire, LS14 6TY; England
- Coordinates: 53.8157°N 1.4612°W

Information
- Type: Academy
- Department for Education URN: 136826 Tables
- Ofsted: Reports
- Age: 11 to 16
- Website: http://www.leedseastacademy.org.uk/

Leeds East Academy (formerly Parklands Girls High School) is a secondary school with academy status, in the Seacroft area of Leeds, West Yorkshire, England.

Previously, the school had been an all-girls school, being the last single-sex school in Leeds. With about 350 pupils, Parklands Girls High School was small for an urban secondary school: Leeds City Council, concluding segregated education was unpopular, made the school mixed-sex, renamed Parklands High School.

The school is now an academy and has a partnership with Leeds West Academy and Leeds City Academy as part of The White Rose Academies Trust. Leeds West and Leeds East Academies were previously sponsored by E-ACT, however in 2014 the schools joined the White Rose Academies Trust with Leeds City College as their sponsor. The Trust are now part of the Luminate Education Group, which also oversees Leeds City College, Keighley College, and Harrogate College. The school moved to new buildings in April 2013.

== Ofsted ==
As part of the White Rose Academies Trust, Leeds East Academy was judged "Requires Improvement" by Ofsted following inspections in 2015 and 2017. In May 2019 the academy was inspected again and judged "Good' in all areas.

== Notable alumni ==
- Alison Lowe, Deputy Mayor of West Yorkshire for Policing and Crime
- Jill Mortimer, Member of Parliament for Hartlepool
- Louise Rennison, Author and Comedian
