= Red Riding =

2009 television film trilogy

- Promotional release poster
- Genre: Crime thriller; Drama
- Based on: Red Riding by David Peace
- Written by: Tony Grisoni
- Directed by: Julian Jarrold; James Marsh; Anand Tucker
- Starring: Mark Addy; Sean Bean; Jim Carter; Warren Clarke; Paddy Considine; Shaun Dooley; James Fox; Gerard Kearns; Andrew Garfield; Rebecca Hall; Sean Harris; Eddie Marsan; David Morrissey; Peter Mullan; Maxine Peake; Lesley Sharp; Robert Sheehan; Laura Carter; Danny Mays; Michelle Dockery
- Country of origin: United Kingdom
- No. of episodes: 3

Production
- Executive producer: Andrew Eaton
- Producers: Anita Overland; Wendy Brazington
- Running time: 120 minutes
- Production company: Revolution Films

Original release
- Network: Channel 4
- Release: 5 March – 19 March 2009

Red Riding is a British crime drama limited series written by Tony Grisoni and based on the book series of the same name by David Peace. The series comprises the novels Nineteen Seventy-Four (1999), Nineteen Seventy-Seven (2000), Nineteen Eighty (2001) and Nineteen Eighty-Three (2002), and the first, third, and fourth of these novels became three feature-length television episodes, Red Riding 1974, Red Riding 1980 and Red Riding 1983. They aired in the United Kingdom on Channel 4 beginning on 5 March 2009. The three episodes were released theatrically in the United States between 5 and 11 February 2010, by IFC Films.

The second episode of the series uses fictionalized accounts of the investigation into the Yorkshire Ripper, a serial killer who stalked the Yorkshire area of England in the 1970s and 1980s. The name of the series is a reference to the murders and to their location, the historic county of Yorkshire being traditionally divided into three areas known as ridings.

== Overview ==
The events take place between 1974 and 1983 and are set partially against the background of the Yorkshire Ripper killings. Set in Leeds, Bradford, Halifax, and the rest of West Yorkshire, both books and films follow several recurring fictional characters through a bleak and violent world of police corruption and organised crime. The novels and television versions blend elements of fact, fiction, and conspiracy theory into a confection dubbed "Yorkshire Noir" by some critics. They offer a chronologically fractured narrative and do not present neat resolutions.

== Plot summaries ==
=== Red Riding 1974 ===
- Director: Julian Jarrold
- Technique: Super 16 mm film with an aspect ratio of 16:9
- Run time: 1 hour, 42 minutes
- Rating: 3.07m

1974. Eddie Dunford (Andrew Garfield), a cocky and naïve cub reporter for The Yorkshire Post, attends a press conference led by D.Supt Maurice Jobson (David Morrissey) regarding the disappearance of ten-year-old Clare Kemplay. Dunford learns about two earlier child disappearances: Susan Ridyard in 1969, and Jeanette Garland in 1972. Suspecting a connection, dismissing police suspicions of Gypsies, and spurred on by his friend and colleague Barry Gannon (Anthony Flanagan), he decides to investigate further.

An anonymous caller informs Dunford of an attack on a Gypsy camp near Hunslet. A meeting between Dunford and DCS Bill Molloy (Warren Clarke) is marked by mutual dislike.

Clare Kemplay is found murdered on a property belonging to John Dawson (Sean Bean), an unscrupulous local real estate developer. Dawson plans to build a shopping centre, using a combination of bribery (small ownership shares) and blackmail on local councillors and the newly formed West Yorkshire Metropolitan Police (WYMP) to secure land purchases and zoning approval.

Clare Kemplay's autopsy reveals that she was tortured, raped and strangled, and her killer stitched swan wings to her body. Gannon dies in an apparent freak accident, shortly after being warned of danger to his life by Dawson's unstable wife Marjorie (Cathryn Bradshaw). An elusive male prostitute named B. J. (Robert Sheehan) gives Dunford incriminating material gathered by Gannon about local officials. While investigating Gannon's death, Dunford believes he has found an ally in young Sgt. Bob Fraser (Steven Robertson).

Dunford visits Jeanette Garland's mother Paula (Rebecca Hall), whose husband had died by suicide due to their daughter's disappearance. This visit costs Dunford a beating from corrupt WYMP officers Tommy Douglas (Tony Mooney) and Bob Craven (Sean Harris), but Paula insists she had not alerted them.

Throwing caution to the wind, Dunford becomes romantically involved with Paula and ignores the officers' threats. He visits Marjorie Dawson in the nursing home where she recovers from the breakdown she had after speaking to Gannon. She hints at more crimes by her husband but is interrupted by Craven and Douglas, who beat Dunford severely and break his hand with a car door.

A Fitzwilliam local of half-Polish descent, Michael Myshkin (Daniel Mays), is arrested on suspicion for the Kemplay murder. It becomes obvious that Myshkin has a learning disability, barely speaks English and is given cues from the police. He implores his innocence, stating "[I]t was the wolf. Under those beautiful carpets", but later, while in custody, confesses to murdering Kemplay, Garland and Ridyard.

Dawson approaches Dunford, feigning respect for Gannon, but drops his friendly façade and becomes aggressive when Dunford refuses a bribe. Dawson tacitly admits to having ordered Gannon's murder, the beatings on Dunford and the arson by the WYMP on the Roma camp in his land. Dunford learns that Paula is sexually involved with Dawson, whom she has known all her life.

Dunford knows Myshkin is innocent, but realises he is in over his head. He convinces Paula to escape Yorkshire with him, then briefly leaves to deliver Gannon's documents to Bob Fraser. Finding Paula missing upon his return, he storms a party in Dawson's palatial home looking for her. He is overpowered and arrested while Marjorie, echoing Myshkin's words, asks him to "tell them about the others, beneath the beautiful new carpets".

Dunford is physically and psychologically tortured by the police officers. Molloy shows him Paula's dead body and suggests the implication that Dawson killed her. The officer Dunford had trusted, Fraser, hands the Gannon documents to Jobson, who burns them at Molloy's behest. After torturing Dunford, Douglas and Craven give him a loaded handgun, obliquely stating that they need "a little favour" from him.

Bloody and frantic, Dunford heads to Dawson's private headquarters at the Karachi Club. He repeatedly pistol-whips Craven, shoots Douglas and Dawson's bodyguard, and questions the businessman at gunpoint while his unhinged wife mutters "the wolf does for John", again echoing Myshkin's cryptic statements. Dawson concedes that he is "no angel" and has "a private weakness", implying his connection to the child murders. Dunford shoots Dawson dead and flees in his car. Finding himself chased by police cars, he reverses course and deliberately drives towards them. A vision of Paula appears to him before his death in the ensuing collision.

=== Red Riding 1980 ===
- Director: James Marsh
- Technique: 2-perf 35 mm film with an anamorphic aspect ratio of 2.35:1
- Run time: 1 hour, 33 minutes
- Rating: 1.99m

In 1980, following public outcry over the failure to catch the Yorkshire Ripper, a "squeaky clean" Manchester police detective, Assistant Chief Constable Peter Hunter (Paddy Considine), is assigned to travel to West Yorkshire to head the WYMP investigation, much to the chagrin of the former head, Bill Molloy. Hunter had previously worked on the Karachi Club massacre (Note: A sequence of events that started with John Dawson's death, but was immediately followed by more violence that is still not fully explained to the audience at the beginning of this second episode.), a case he had to abandon due to his wife Joan's (Lesley Sharp) miscarriage. A member of Hunter's picked team is Helen Marshall (Maxine Peake), his former adulterous lover. The other member is Detective Chief Superintendent John Nolan (Tony Pitts), who knows the WYMP officers well. The two cases – massacre and serial killings – are linked by Bob Craven, who behaves in an openly hostile manner to the new team. Hunter correctly deduces that the Ripper inquiry is being side-tracked by the Wearside Jack tapes, and feels that the real Ripper has been interviewed and missed.

Hunter suspects that one of the Ripper's supposed victims, Clare Strachan, was not a Ripper victim. Given the different types of injuries she displayed, she had not been linked to the other victims until a letter was sent, allegedly by the Ripper, to Molloy and the press claiming responsibility for her murder. Hunter receives information from B. J., who is introduced through Reverend Martin Laws (Peter Mullan). B. J., who was Strachan's close friend, claims that she was a prostitute working for Eric Hall, a WYMP policeman (deceased). Hall's wife Elizabeth (Julia Ford) requests that Hunter meet her, and after visiting her house – where Laws is also present – she provides proof of Hall's work as a pimp and pornographer. She confirms that Hall was a suspect in the Strachan case until the letter turned up. She also mentions that he was convinced (and increasingly vocal) that Strachan was not a Ripper victim, and posits that he was killed as a result. She says she had given Hall's documents to Jobson, but the latter claims to have lost the files. Meanwhile, the former affair between Hunter and Marshall threatens to reignite.

Hunter interrogates Detective Inspectors Dick Alderman (Shaun Dooley) and Jim Prentice (Chris Walker). Alderman lets slip that the Strachan murder was probably committed by Hall, covered-up to look like a Ripper murder. Hunter also visits the now debilitated Tommy Douglas who later phones him demanding that they meet at his house. Hunter arrives to find Douglas and his daughter Karen (Charlotte James) killed. Hunter is seriously intimidated when he receives covertly taken photos of himself and Marshall in compromising positions. Their burgeoning affair is cut short when she reveals that she had fallen pregnant and Reverend Laws helped her have an abortion.

Near the end of Hunter's Christmas holiday, his Manchester house is burned down. Hunter then learns that his superiors have taken him off the Ripper case due to unspecified allegations of disciplinary breaches. He returns to West Yorkshire for a scheduled meeting with Jobson, but it appears, amid great fanfare, that the Yorkshire Ripper has been captured. The suspect confesses to all murders except that of Strachan, which he denies.

Hunter tracks down B. J., who finally reveals the entire timeline of the Karachi Club massacre, that masked policemen burst in shortly after Eddie Dunford's revenge on Dawson, killing all civilian witnesses and finding Bob Craven and Tommy Douglas wounded by Eddie. Strachan was a barmaid at the club; she and her friend B. J. witnessed everything while hiding behind the bar, and were spotted by Chief Constable Harold Angus (Jim Carter) and Craven as they fled the premises. B. J. is the only surviving witness to the Karachi Club massacre, which forces him to flee town. B. J. also implies that Craven was the murderer of Strachan.

Hunter meets John Nolan in Millgarth Station, Leeds, to reveal this new information. Nolan takes Hunter downstairs to the cells where Hunter finds Craven slouched back in a chair, shot through his head. He realises that Nolan was one of the five who took part in the Karachi Club shootings and Nolan quickly shoots him dead. Alderman and Prentice plant the gun, along with another, to make it look like Hunter and Craven shot each other. In a final scene, Joan Hunter is comforted by Reverend Laws at her husband's graveside.

=== Red Riding 1983 ===
- Director: Anand Tucker
- Technique: taped with a Red One digital camera
- Run time: 1 hour, 45 minutes
- Rating: 2.05m

Maurice Jobson (David Morrissey) has spent years plagued by guilt over his reluctant participation in the corrupt activities within the WYMP, including a conspiracy protecting high-profile figures such as John Dawson.

It was Jobson who tipped off Dunford about the Roma camp arson, after participating in it under pressure by Molloy. The camp site was vacated to pursue Dawson's £100m shopping centre investment along with Jobson, Molloy, Angus, Alderman, Prentice, Douglas, Craven, and Nolan from Manchester. This investment, and the vice racket whose proceeds helped fund it, were discussed before the events of the first episode, during the marriage of Molloy's daughter to Bob Fraser. (Note: The apparently "honest" officer Dunford trusted in the first episode.)

Jobson also knew about the innocence of Michael Myshkin, who confessed to the child murders in 1974. Flashbacks show that a witness placed Reverend Laws near where Clare Kemplay's body was dumped. Laws was tortured until he mentioned Dawson, who promptly corroborated the priest's alibi; this, and the businessman's ominous fascination with swans, pointed to Dawson and Laws' guilt, but Molloy ordered Jobson to keep his suspicions to himself.

Jobson's pangs of conscience intensify in 1983 when a girl named Hazel Atkins (Tamsin Mitchell) disappears and he reopens the previous child murder cases. Angus allows Jobson to question Myshkin in gaol but orders Alderman to accompany him. Michael is unnerved and rendered incommunicative by Alderman's presence, suggesting that he was tortured in 1974.

Jobson starts a relationship with a medium, Mandy Wymer (Saskia Reeves), who knows important facts about the crimes. Angus dismisses Wymer's leads, reveals his knowledge of Jobson's tip to Dunford about the 1974 camp raid, angrily derides Jobson's scruples and orders him to retire quietly.

John Piggott (Mark Addy), a solicitor and the son of a notorious WYMP officer, decides to explore the Atkins case after being contacted by Myshkin's mother (Barbara Kelley), who believes that the new disappearance exonerates Michael. Michael repeats his cryptic 1974 statements about "the wolf" and reveals that his confession had been coerced by the police and his solicitor. Piggott's inquiries lead to Myshkin's friend, Leonard Cole (Gerard Kearns), who found Kemplay's body and is framed for Atkins' disappearance. Before Piggott can become his solicitor, Cole is tortured and murdered by Prentice and Alderman. Jobson cannot bring himself to witness Cole's final moments, officially disguised as a suicide.

Using information from Myshkin and his own childhood memories of Fitzwilliam, Piggott finds a mine shaft hidden in a pigeon shed near Laws's home. The underground tunnel is revealed to be the epicentre of a paedophile and child-murdering ring run by Laws and catering to citizens of diverse social relevance, including Dawson and Piggott's father.

Details such as the ring's geographic sprawl, body count and number of surviving victims (including Myshkin) are left unknown. It is implied that the ring risked public scrutiny after children with known, stable, local families disappeared. Such risk increased with the lurid media coverage of the Kemplay murder. This was the reason for the constables' indirect assistance in Dawson's demise, thereby solving what Angus called "two little problems" (a nosy, incorruptible journalist (Dunford) and a businessman with an out-of-control perversion (Dawson)) at the same time to protect their commercial centre investment. After 1974, Laws clearly counted on the complicity and cooperation of the WYMP; the reasons why he did not share Dawson's fate, and the degree of knowledge WYMP brass had of his activities before that year, are left unexplained.

Finally, it is revealed that B. J. had also been abused by this ring as a child. (Note: In their final confrontation, Laws tells B. J. "you were the first" but it is unclear whether he means "first victim" or "first surviving victim", assuming his claim is sincere.) After a stint in gaol, B. J. returns to Laws' home to exact revenge but in the last moment is unable to do so due to Laws' mind-numbing, domineering influence on him. Laws restrains B. J. and is about to use an electric drill on his head when Jobson appears with a shotgun and shoots the reverend dead. He then opens the hidden entrance to the mineshaft just in time for Piggott to emerge from it with Hazel Atkins alive in his arms. B. J. flees to Blackpool by train, reflecting on his upbringing, his experiences, and his "escape" from the past of West Yorkshire. Thus, three characters – Jobson, Piggott, and B. J. – achieve a measure of redemption.

== Cast ==
- Eddie Dunford (Andrew Garfield), a young and ambitious reporter (and aspiring crime correspondent) for The Yorkshire Post and the main protagonist of the first episode. After a mostly unexplained stint "down south", he returns to his native Yorkshire following the death of his father (a reputable local tailor), whose funeral he misses to attend the Clare Kemplay disappearance press conference. During his father's wake, he first hears about the two earlier missing girls and decides to investigate.
- Assistant Chief Constable Peter Hunter (Paddy Considine), protagonist of the second episode who is brought in from Manchester Police to West Yorkshire on two occasions, after the 1974 Karachi Club massacre, and to catch the Yorkshire Ripper in 1980. He is a non-practising Catholic and a married man with no children.
- Detective Superintendent Maurice Jobson (David Morrissey), nicknamed "the Owl" by his colleagues, a background character in the first two episodes and one of the protagonists of the third. Although a participant in most of the corruption in the WYMP, his lingering conscience and the high-functioning depression resulting from it drive most of the events in 1983. His wife left him and took their children sometime between 1974 and 1983; in later conversation CC Angus perceives Jobson as weak and ascribes his divorce, as well as his failure to secure promotions, to Jobson's obvious reluctance to abet the corruption.
- John Piggott (Mark Addy), one of the protagonists of the third episode; a washed-out solicitor who grew up in Fitzwilliam next door to Mary Cole and Reverend Laws, and whose late father, Arthur "The Pig" Piggott, was an officer of the WYMP. He returns to Fitzwilliam due to his mother's funeral, and is approached separately by Mrs Cole and Mrs Myshkin to represent their respective sons. A flashback reveals that his father died in his home in a violent incident (either murder or suicide) that is left mostly unexplained to the audience.
- John Dawson (Sean Bean), a businessman who has built a deep web of corruption involving local politicians and the WYMP, and the first episode's main antagonist. He has enough money and clout to use WYMP officers as thugs, arsonists and hitmen. He is also a sadistic paedophile, implied to have participated in the torture and death of at least one of the missing girls (Clare Kemplay). He is implicitly referred to as "The Swan" in Mandy Wymer's séances, probably because of his fascination with the animal.
- Detective Constable Helen Marshall (Maxine Peake), Peter Hunter's subordinate in the Manchester Police and one of the members of his hand-picked team to investigate the Yorkshire Ripper in 1980. She is also revealed to have been involved in an intermittent secret affair with him before and during the events of the second episode.
- Reverend Martin Laws (Peter Mullan), an Anglican priest, appears as a secondary character in the first two episodes, to be revealed in 1983 to be the antagonist of the series. He had been running a widespread sadistic paedophile ring for years, many of whose victims were tortured to death, and had enjoyed protection from the WYMP at least since 1974. He is heavily implied to be the "Wolf" mentioned by Mandy Wymer and Michael Myshkin.
- B. J. (Robert Sheehan), a local rent boy, appears in all three episodes. He is revealed to be a main character in the third. As a child he was abducted and raped by Laws and his paedophile ring. According to Laws during their final encounter, he could have been the first such victim, but the viewer never knows for sure.
- Mandy Wymer (Saskia Reeves), a medium in possession of information about the child murders, not released to the media. She and Maurice Jobson become romantically involved in 1983.
- Barry Gannon (Anthony Flanagan), Eddie Dunford's friend and a politically conscious journalist at the Yorkshire Post. He is implied to have had some sort of "mutually beneficial" coexistence with John Dawson until 1974 and may have obtained some of his valuable information from the businessman. His decision to visit Mrs Dawson and question her about her husband's corruption leads to his death, which Mrs Dawson had warned him about.
- Paula Garland (Rebecca Hall), mother of one of the missing girls and a widower since her husband's suicide. She still grieves her daughter's disappearance and refuses to believe she is dead. She enters an ill-fated romantic relationship with Eddie Dunford in 1974, despite being sexually involved with John Dawson as well.
- Clive McGuiness (Hilton McRae) a corrupt solicitor who assisted the WYMP in convincing his client Michael Myshkin to accept a guilty plea for the child murders. He briefly acts as Leonard's duty solicitor in 1983 before Mary Cole contacts Piggott, and is later confronted by the latter regarding his malpractice.
- Jack Whitehead (Eddie Marsan), Eddie Dunford's older, alcoholic and more seasoned colleague at the Yorkshire Post, who hands Dunford a copy of the Kemplay post-mortem report.
- Chief Constable Harold Angus (Jim Carter), the mastermind behind most of the corruption in the WYMP including the £100m joint investment with Dawson, and perhaps the other main antagonist of the series besides Dawson and Laws. He is the most senior officer in the WYMP, and is strongly implied to be more intelligent than the rest of his corrupt detective clique. He reveals to Jobson that he knew of his past betrayal (tipping off Dunford about the 1974 Roma camp arson) and forces him to retire early. His degree of pre-1974 knowledge of (and potential involvement in) the paedophile ring is left open to speculation. Unlike Laws and Dawson, his fate after the events of 1983 is not revealed and it is possible that he escapes prosecution.
- Detective Chief Superintendent Bill Molloy (Warren Clarke), nicknamed "The Badger" by his colleagues, a corrupt senior member of the WYMP. His surprise at the revelation of Laws' and Dawson's criminal activities in 1974 is possibly genuine, but he willingly participates in the cover-up anyway in order to protect his investment in Dawson's commercial centre. B. J. identifies him as one of the Karachi Club gunmen because he recognised his voice as he was ordering his colleagues to kill everyone present. His combination of incompetence and obsessive personal involvement in the Yorkshire Ripper investigation leads Angus unceremoniously to replace him with Peter Hunter as main investigator.
- Detective Inspector later Detective Chief Superindentent John Nolan (Tony Pitts), the other Manchester Police officer picked by his boss Peter Hunter to investigate the Ripper Murders. Nolan betrays Hunter and is revealed to be corrupt, connected to the WYMP. He is involved in the £100m Dawson investment, and uses his vice connections and offices in Manchester to control the illegal distribution of pornographic magazines. He also admits, right before killing Hunter, to being one of the masked Karachi Club gunmen who killed the witnesses and contaminated the scene after Dawson's death.
- Detectives Dick Alderman (Shaun Dooley) and Jim Prentice (Chris Walker), two corrupt officers adept at torture and heavily implied to be among those who cleared the Karachi Club of surviving witnesses in 1974. They also torture and kill Leonard Cole in 1983, and are implied to have tortured Myshkin in 1974.
- PC Tommy Douglas (Tony Mooney), a corrupt WYMP officer who participated in Eddie Dunford's torture and in orchestrating his revenge on John Dawson in 1974. He is discharged from the force after being shot by Dunford, and is later murdered (along with his daughter) before he can speak to Peter Hunter.
- Sergeant later Detective Superintendent, Bob Craven (Sean Harris). Douglas' friend and partner in crime, probably the more sadistic of the two. They both subject Dunford to increasing levels of violence throughout the first episode. Acting at the behest of Bill Molloy and Harold Angus, he and Douglas manipulate Dunford into killing Dawson, but are caught off-guard and seriously injured when the latter shows up for his revenge earlier than they expected. Craven later murders Clare Strachan, who had witnessed the Karachi Club massacre. He is a major antagonist in the first two episodes until he meets a fate similar to Douglas' at the hands of his colleagues in order to tie loose ends.
- Sergeant Bob Fraser (Steven Robertson), a young officer whose friendly, mild-mannered appearance is misread by Dunford as indicative of honesty and openness to collaborate with the media. He betrays Dunford, handing Dunford's documents to Jobson. He is later revealed to be Bill Molloy's son-in-law.
- Peter Sutcliffe (Joseph Mawle), the Yorkshire Ripper; he is questioned by Jobson at the end of the second episode and denies that Clare Strachan as one of his victims although he includes other victims not originally identified by the police.
- Leonard Cole (Gerard Kearns), a young Fitzwilliam local who found Clare Kemplay's body in 1974. He is framed by corrupt WYMP officers for Hazel Atkins' disappearance in 1983 and is tortured to death before John Piggott can speak to him. He is referred to as "our Leonard" by Martin Laws, but is likely to have been born from Mary Cole's earlier relationship.
- Michael Myshkin (Daniel Mays), a Fitzwilliam local with learning difficulties, whose Polish father, a miner, died from black lung disease sometime between 1974 and 1983. He is framed for, and forced to confess to, the murder of three local girls, but is later revealed to be innocent in 1983. His fate after the final episode, including his possible release, is left open to speculation.
- Mary Cole (Cara Seymour), Leonard's mother and a next-door neighbour of the Piggott family. She seems to be in some sort of (mostly unexplained) coexistence with Reverend Laws.
- Marjorie Dawson (Cathryn Bradshaw), John Dawson's mentally unstable wife. She is obviously aware to some degree of her husband's criminal activities (both the local corruption and the abduction and murder of young girls) and complains that he "used to be more careful". She seems cooperative with Gannon when the latter tries to dig dirt on her husband, but has a nervous breakdown shortly after his visit. She uses the same terminology ("the others, under those beautiful carpets") as Mandy Wymer and Michael Myshkin, but the audience never knows for sure where this common knowledge about the child victims stems from.
- Bill Hadley (John Henshaw), Eddie Dunford's corrupt boss at the Yorkshire Post.
- Clare Strachan (Kelly Freemantle), a waitress at the Karachi Club and a prostitute whose pimp, Eric Hall, was a former WYMP detective. Her murder (later revealed to be at the hands of Bob Craven) plays a major role in Peter Hunter's investigation once he discovers that she was wrongly classified as a Yorkshire Ripper victim, and that she died because she had witnessed the Karachi Club massacre along with her friend B. J.
- Kathryn Tyler (Michelle Dockery), a reporter at the Yorkshire Post, and Eddie Dunford's on-again, off-again girlfriend. She acts as a liaison between Mandy Wymer and the WYMP detectives in 1983.
- Tessa (Catherine Tyldesley), Leonard Cole's girlfriend who is later revealed to have helped frame Michael Myshkin under pressure by the WYMP.

Character	1974	1980	1983
DI Dick Alderman	Shaun Dooley	Shaun Dooley	Shaun Dooley
CC Harold Angus		Jim Carter	Jim Carter
Hazel Atkins			Tamsin Mitchell
Mr Atkins			Andrew Cryer
Bet	Lynn Roden		
B. J. (older)	Robert Sheehan	Robert Sheehan	Robert Sheehan
B. J. (younger)			James Ainsworth
Paul Booker	Ian Mercer		Ian Mercer
Sgt John Chain		James Weaver	
Leonard Cole	Gerard Kearns		Gerard Kearns
Mary Cole	Cara Seymour		Cara Seymour
Sgt/DSupt Bob Craven	Sean Harris	Sean Harris	Sean Harris
John Dawson	Sean Bean		Sean Bean
Marjorie Dawson	Cathryn Bradshaw		
Karen Douglas		Charlotte James	
Sharon Douglas		Michelle Holmes	
PC Tommy Douglas	Tony Mooney	Tony Mooney	Tony Mooney
Eddie Dunford	Andrew Garfield	Andrew Garfield	Andrew Garfield
Susan Dunford	Rachel Jane Allen		
Uncle Eric	Graham Walker		
HMIC Philip Evans		James Fox	
Sgt Bob Fraser	Steven Robertson		Steven Robertson
Barry Gannon	Anthony Flanagan		
Paula Garland	Rebecca Hall		
Gaz	Danny Cunningham		
George Greaves	Berwick Kaler		
Bill Hadley	John Henshaw		John Henshaw
Elizabeth Hall		Julia Ford	
Joan Hunter		Lesley Sharp	
ACC Peter Hunter		Paddy Considine	
Judith Jobson			Lisa Howard
DSupt/DCS Maurice Jobson	David Morrissey	David Morrissey	David Morrissey
Jim Kelly			Gary Whittaker
Mr Kemplay	Stewart Ross		
Mrs Kemplay	Jennifer Hennessy		
Rev Martin Laws	Peter Mullan	Peter Mullan	Peter Mullan
Clive McGuiness			Hilton McRae
HMCIC Sir John Marsden		David Calder	
DC Helen Marshall		Maxine Peake	
DCS/ACC Bill Molloy	Warren Clarke	Warren Clarke	Warren Clarke
Michael Myshkin	Daniel Mays		Daniel Mays
Mrs Myshkin			Beatrice Kelley
DCS John Nolan		Tony Pitts	Tony Pitts
John Piggott			Mark Addy
DI Jim Prentice	Chris Walker	Chris Walker	Chris Walker
Susan Ridyard			Emily Millicent Mott
CC Clement Smith		Ron Cook	
Clare Strachan	Kelly Freemantle	Kelly Freemantle	
Peter Sutcliffe		Joseph Mawle	
Kathryn Tyler	Michelle Dockery		Michelle Dockery
Steph	Katherine Vasey		
Tessa			Catherine Tyldesley
Michael Warren		Nicholas Woodeson	
Jack Whitehead	Eddie Marsan	Eddie Marsan	
Aunt Win	Rita May		
Mandy Wymer			Saskia Reeves

== Filming and production ==
On 8 and 10 September 2008 the cast and crew were spotted filming at the Connaught Rooms on Manningham Lane, and a Victorian house on the corner of Selbourne Mount and North Park Road, just across the road from Cartwright Hall in Lister Park, Manningham, Bradford, West Yorkshire, which was also used. On 5 October Sean Bean, Paddy Considine, Jim Carter, Warren Clarke, Chris Walker, Sean Harris and James Weaver were spotted filming at the Connaught Rooms again, which was used multiple more times in the following weeks. The cast and crew were later spotted filming in Little Germany, Bradford. Filming also took place at the former Presbyterian Church on 1 Simes Street, Bradford, which was being used as the Koh-I-Noor Indian restaurant at the time, was used as The Karachi Club in the trilogy. The former Bradford Central Police Station on The Tyrls in Bradford city centre, which has since been demolished and built over with Bradford City Park, was also used.

Other locations included Seacroft Hospital and Brudenell Social Club in Leeds, West Yorkshire. The Brudenell was also used as The Karachi Club in the trilogy. HM Prison Leeds, Cookridge Hospital, and The Yorkshire Post's Wellington Street building which was demolished in 2014, in Leeds were also used.

Filming also took place at Arden Road Social Club in Halifax, West Yorkshire, the National Coal Mining Museum for England in Wakefield, West Yorkshire, and Huddersfield, West Yorkshire.

== Historical basis ==
The television trailers for all three Red Riding episodes bore the tagline "Based on True Events". Nevertheless, none of the characters, nor the murder victims, bear the names of real people (with the possible exception of Peter Sutcliffe) and only a few have obvious real-life models.

The wrongful prosecution and imprisonment of the character Michael Myshkin is a clear parallel to the real-life case of Stefan Kiszko, falsely accused of and convicted for the killing of 11-year-old Lesley Molseed in 1975. He was later proved innocent.

The mission and subsequent official vilification of Assistant Chief Constable Peter Hunter in Red Riding 1980 are strongly reminiscent of the case of John Stalker, a real life Deputy Chief Constable of the Greater Manchester Police who headed an investigation into the shooting of suspected members of the Provisional Irish Republican Army in 1982.

== Awards and nominations ==
The films won The TV Dagger at the 2009 Crime Thriller Awards. At the 2010 British Academy Television Awards, the series was nominated for Best Drama Serial while Rebecca Hall won Best Supporting Actress.

== Theatrical film adaptation ==
Columbia Pictures acquired the rights to adapt the novels and films into a theatrical film. The studio was negotiating with Ridley Scott in October 2009 to direct.

The trilogy was released on DVD and Blu-ray in the United States by IFC Films on 5 February 2010.

== Overseas broadcasting ==
The series has been aired by Danish public broadcaster DR1 on two occasions under the title Pigen med den røde hætte (The Girl with the Red Cap). It has also been aired by SVT in Sweden, by Rai 4 in Italy, by ARD in Germany, and by SBS in Australia.
