= North Birmingham Academy =

Location
- 395 College Road; Erdington; Birmingham, B44 0HF; England; 52.53352°N 1.87442°W

Information
- Type: Academy
- Local authority: Birmingham
- Department for Education URN: 136032 Tables
- Ofsted: Reports
- Head teacher: David Karim
- Gender: Coeducational
- Age: 11 to 19
- Enrolment: 1,167
- Website: https://northbirminghamacademy.e-act.org.uk/

North Birmingham Academy is a coeducational secondary school and sixth form located in the Perry Common area of Birmingham, England.

Previously a community school administered by Birmingham City Council, the school converted to academy status on 1 January 2010 and is now sponsored by E-ACT. However North Birmingham Academy continues to coordinate with Birmingham City Council for admissions. The school moved into new buildings in 2013.

North Birmingham Academy offers GCSEs and BTECs as programmes of study for pupils. At the same time, students in the sixth form have the option to study from a range of A-levels and further BTECs. The school had specialisms in English and the arts before the specialist school programme was scrapped by the coalition government in 2010.

The school was founded as Perry Common Comprehensive School and was also known as College High School for several years.
