= Oldham Academy North =

Coordinates: 53.56°N 2.1259°W

The Oldham Academy North

Location
- Broadway, Royton; Oldham, Greater Manchester, OL2 5BF; England

Information
- Former name: Grange High School
- Type: Academy
- Motto: Trust, Endurance, Autonomy & Mastery
- Established: 2010
- Trust: E-ACT
- Department for Education URN: 136115 Tables
- Ofsted: Reports
- Headteacher: Natalie Kennerley
- Gender: Coeducational
- Age: 11 to 16
- Enrolment: 1330
- Website: theoldhamacademynorth.e-act.org.uk

Previous Address Grange High School Rochdale Road OL9 6QA

The Oldham Academy North (TOAN) is a mixed gender secondary school with academy status for 11- to 16-year-olds located in the Royton area of Oldham, Greater Manchester, England.

The academy is sponsored by E-ACT. The school relocated to a new campus in Royton in 2013. It is also the home to Shaw Millionaires Ball Hockey Club.

In September 2019, TOAN opened the doors to its new £5 million building, which facilitates the entire Humanities' classrooms - along with several miscellaneous subjects and a "state-of-the-art" lecture theatre

== Controversies ==
=== Students forced to pray outside ===
In 2021, video of Muslim TOAN students performing Friday prayers outside the academy "in the cold" circulated online. They attempted to pray inside, before a member of staff shouted at them. This caused online "outrage", condemnation and criticism from Muslims, and praise for the students for the commitment towards their religion. The academy worked with Oldham Council and the Oldham Interfaith Forum to issue a joint statement, offering a "wholehearted" apology.

=== Derogatory remarks by former headteacher ===
Old Tweets made by TOAN's headteacher Rachel Hallam were discovered in 2022 containing "racial and derogatory comments". This too caused unrest and disappointment, though the Tweets were made more than a decade ago. Hallam subsequently resigned before being appointed as headteacher at another school.

== Notable former pupils ==
=== Grange High School ===
- Anthony Flanagan, actor
