= The Featherstone Academy =

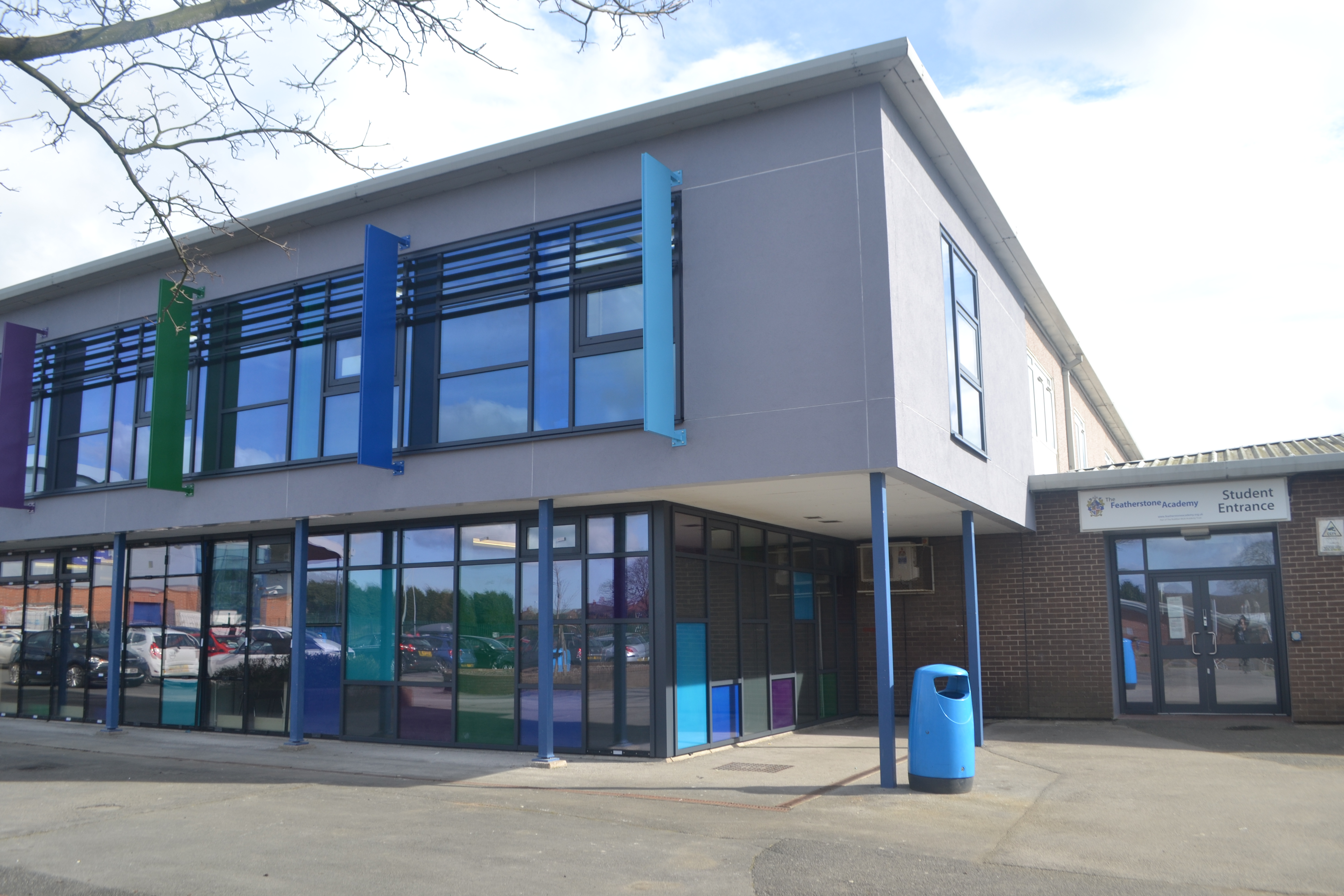
- The Featherstone Academy in 2017

Location
- Pontefract Road; Purston; Featherstone; City of Wakefield, West Yorkshire, WF7 5AJ; England; 53.6742°N 1.3409°W

Information
- Type: Academy
- Local authority: Wakefield Council
- Department for Education URN: 138593 Tables
- Ofsted: Reports
- Principal: Julia McCluskey
- Gender: Coeducational
- Age: 11 to 16
- Website: http://www.featherstone.academy

The Featherstone Academy is a coeducational secondary school with academy status located in Featherstone in the English county of West Yorkshire.

Formerly known as Featherstone High School, it became a specialist Technology College in 2005 and was renamed Featherstone Technology College. In 2012 the school converted to academy status and was renamed the Purston E-ACT Academy. E-ACT were the previous sponsor of the academy, but in 2014 the school changed sponsor to the Rodillian Multi Academy Trust and was renamed the Featherstone Academy. The Rodillian Multi Academy Trust also includes the Rodillian Academy, Southway, BBG Academy and Brayton Academy.
