= Hugh Fish =

English chemist

Sir Hugh Fish, CBE (6 January 1923 – 27 May 1999) was an English chemist who was one of the architects of the UK water industry in the late 20th century, and was responsible for the clean-up of the River Thames.

== Life ==
Fish was born in Woodlesford, West Yorkshire on 6 January 1923, and went to Rothwell Grammar School. He then studied chemistry at the University of Leeds, but broke off to join the Royal Naval Volunteer Reserve in 1942, serving on the Arctic convoys of World War II and rising to the rank of lieutenant by the end of the war. He completed his degree and began his professional life as a chemist. He married Nancy Asquith (died 4 October 2005) in 1943 and they had two sons and a daughter. He died in Wallingford, Oxfordshire on 27 May 1999.

== Career ==
He held scientific posts related to rivers and rose to become chief executive of Thames Water Authority from 1978 to 1984. During this period the water quality improved so that over 100 species of fish were present, and a salmon was caught in 1985. In 1976 he was appointed to the board of the Natural Environment Research Council and was chairman for four years from 1984. He was then involved in overseeing the privatisation of the water industry as a member of the board of the National Rivers Authority.

== Honours ==
He received an OBE in 1971 and CBE in 1984. He was knighted in 1989. He served as President of the Institute of Fisheries Management and was a Visiting Professor of the University of Hertfordshire. He was a Fellow of the Royal Society of Chemistry and of the Institute of Water and Environmental Management.
