= Parkwood E-ACT Academy =

Secondary school in Sheffield, South Yorkshire, England

Location
- Longley Avenue West; Sheffield, South Yorkshire, S5 8UL; England; 53.41276°N 1.48528°W

Information
- Established: 2009
- Local authority: City of Sheffield
- Specialist: Languages and Maths
- Department for Education URN: 135934 Tables
- Ofsted: Reports
- Headteacher: J. Hinchliffe
- Gender: Mixed
- Age: 11 to 16
- Enrolment: around 900
- Colours: Purple, teal and black
- Website: https://parkwoodacademy.e-act.org.uk/

Parkwood E-ACT Academy is a secondary school located in Sheffield, South Yorkshire, England.

It opened as Parkwood High School, a "fresh start" school, in September 2000, following the closure of Herries School. On 1 September 2009, it became Parkwood Academy.

Feeder primary schools include Pathways E-act, Oasis Watermead, Hillsborough primary and Watercliffe Meadow. The former headteacher is Gemma Cottingham and the current headteacher is Joel Hinchliffe; deputy head is Greg Henderson.

The school was featured in an episode of Channel 4's documentary series The Secret Teacher in 2019.

In 2026 they implemented a new "Phones under control" rule, meaning phones have to be locked in a pouch throughout the school day, ensuring focus during lessons. As of 2026, the school has year group-specific ties. From year 7 to year 9, they keep the same tie (either teal and purple, purple and black, or teal and black) up until Year 10 having plain purple and then in Year 11 having plain teal. The school rules include: no phones, keep to the dress code, and no racism, sexism, homophobia or discrimination. The school promotes the LGBTQ+ community, follows the anti-hair discrimination Halo Code, is a part of the white ribbon online safety program and welcomes everyone.

The academy is sponsored by E-ACT, and it moved into a new building in April 2012.
