= Willenhall E-ACT Academy =

Location
- Furzebank Way; Willenhall, West Midlands, WV12 4BD; England; 52.599°N 2.026°W

Information
- Former name: Willenhall School Sports College
- Type: Academy
- Motto: Nos iactare dux in cibum
- Local authority: Walsall Council
- Trust: E-ACT
- Department for Education URN: 137706 Tables
- Ofsted: Reports
- Head teacher: Emma Clements
- Gender: Mixed
- Age range: 11–16
- Enrolment: 1,009
- Capacity: 1,350
- Website: willenhallacademy.e-act.org.uk

Willenhall E-ACT Academy (formerly Willenhall School Sports College) is an 11–18 mixed secondary school and sixth form with academy status in Willenhall, West Midlands, England.

It was a foundation school that was originally known as Willenhall Comprehensive School and had a specialist Sports College and Science College status. It adopted its present name after becoming an academy in 2012.

== History ==
=== Willenhall School Sports College ===
Willenhall School Sports College was a foundation school that was originally known as Willenhall Comprehensive School until its acquisition of Sports College status through the specialist schools programme in 2001. In 2005, it acquired secondary status as a Science College.

In the years before becoming an academy, it was the biggest secondary school in the Metropolitan Borough of Walsall with over 1600 pupils and 150 staff. The school day began at 8.30am and finished early at 2.40pm, however extra-curricular clubs continued until 5.25pm. Pupils were split into one of eight houses. Whilst pupils in Year Seven had their own form, pupils in Years Eight - Eleven were in mixed year forms. Each house was made up of six forms. The school, which was headed by Mrs VP Till in its final years, also housed a community centre, a community library and a fitness suite (available for use by the local community).

According to Government statistics the school was under achieving in the 2007 GCSE Results, but was ranked in the middle of fellow senior schools in Walsall. The 2009 GCSE results were the school's best ever. Overall 74% of pupils achieved five Grades A*-C at GCSE Level, with 34% achieving five including Maths and English. In A Level results, 94% of students passed their exams, with a total of 41 A Grades having been awarded.

== Colleges ==
Willenhall E-ACT Academy has four "colleges": blue, green, red, and yellow. The colleges compete against each other in a wide variety of competitions both sporting and academic.

== Statutory inspections ==
In March 2015 the statutory inspection body OFSTED found that the school "requires improvement", but by March 2017 this had declined further, to "inadequate", with pupils' behavioural standards attracting particular criticism. For example, in May 2017, students threw food at Ofsted Inspectors. In June 2017, staff members of the National Union of Teachers and NASUWT unions carried out a strike, over 'unreasonable' management and the safety of staff, with a further two strike days planned for July of the same year.
