= The Gainsborough Academy =

Location
- Sweyn Lane; Gainsborough, Lincolnshire, DN21 1PB; England; 53.4083°N 0.7545°W

Information
- Type: Academy
- Motto: We aim to send all young people into an ever-changing world able and qualified to play their full part in it.
- Established: 1 September 2008 (by merger, as Trent Valley Academy)
- Specialists: Performing arts & technology
- Department for Education URN: 145954 Tables
- Ofsted: Reports
- Executive Principal: R. Skelton
- Gender: Co-educational
- Age: 11 to 16
- Houses: Valiant, Endeavour, Challenge, Discover
- Website: thegainsboroughacademy.org.uk

The Gainsborough Academy is a secondary school with academy status located in Gainsborough, Lincolnshire, England. The academy has specialisms in technology and performing arts.

== History ==
=== Former Castle Hills school ===
Castle Hills Secondary Modern school opened on Tuesday 6 January 1958 for 276 children, but had capacity for 480. It had 12 classrooms, and science labs, and a metalwork room.

It was an 18-acre site, designed by Myles-White, Vallance and Westwick. It cost £150,000. In November 1957 it was given the name at a Lindsey County Council meeting. Previously the proposed school was known as The Avenue Secondary School.

It was fully complete by the end of February 1958. There were four streams - academic, technical, commercial, and domestic science or pre-nursing. The sports field was 17 acres. Sports were football, hockey, netball and basketball, but no rugby.

It was officially opened on 4 October 1958 by the Chairman of Lindsey County Council. It served the villages of Scotter, Laughton, Blyton and Corringham.

The headteacher was Mr Roland Mark Underhill, who lived on Dorton Avenue, with two daughters. He left in December 1975. He attended King Edward VI Five Ways School and the University of Birmingham, gaining an Education diploma in 1933. He taught science (biology) at Sloane School in London from 1937, where he was also a scoutmaster. He later taught at Wandsworth Training College.

41 year old Peter Fleet was headmaster from January 1976, moving from Carlisle. 54 year old Peter Fleet left in July 1989, for health reasons, replaced by Peter Lewis Elliott, the deputy head of a comprehensive. Peter Elliott would be head of the Castle Hills Community School for the rest of the 1990s.

=== Former Middlefield school ===
A new secondary school would be built on Middlefield Lane. Lindsey County Education Committee approved the school at the end of 1962 for £200,000. The former South and North Secondary schools would be closed. Construction took place during 1964. It would be called Middlefield Lane Secondary School, which opened on Tuesday 4 January 1966, with 475 children.

The headteacher was Norman Green. The two deputy headteachers were the former heads of the South and North secondary schools, and the staff of these former schools moved to the new site. The official opening would be Thursday 26 May 1966 at 2.30pm. The school construction cost £211,000, and was opened by William Alexander, Baron Alexander of Potterhill, general secretary of the Association of Education Committees, with his wife, with around 500 guests, with the chairmen of Lindsey County Council and Lindsey Education Committee. It had nine acres of fields, and was designed by the county architect Ronald Clark. The two former schools were sixty years old. Gilbert Ash Ltd, of London, built the school, founded by Wilfrid Cracroft Ash, and bought by Hollandsche Beton Groep in 1992.

Norman Green left in December 1976. Harry Johnson took over as headmaster in April 1977; he originated from Darlington, with a degree in Zoology from Newcastle University. He was head of the upper school of Sir Robert Pattinson, a comprehensive school in North Hykeham, and lived in Beckingham, Lincolnshire. He had taught for 17 years in Buckinghamshire. In 1984, Mr Johnson described the eleven-plus exam as a 'barbarity' that 'created distinctions between children which lasted them throughout life'. Harry Johnson left in July 1988.

44 year old Mrs Margaret Cox was headteacher from September 1988. She had lived in Retford since 1974, and came from a school in Worksop.

Paddy Ashdown, the Lib Dem leader, visited on 23 February 1989. Margaret Cox left at the end of November 1997.

From 1 December 1997 the acting headmaster was Barry Tointon, of the Caistor Yarborough School.

Michael Rose was headmaster from September 1998.

=== Academy ===
It opened as Trent Valley Academy on 1 September 2008. It is a mainstream (11-16) school created by the merger of two existing secondary schools, Castle Hills and Middlefield School. The two predecessor sites are now closed, and a new purpose-built facility has been built on Corringham Road, Gainsborough. The construction project has produced a four-storey, 15,000-square-metre building on a 12-hectare site. This was the first new school built in Lincolnshire in over 40 years, and budgeted at £23 million, with a final cost of around £40 million.

It was established by the lead sponsor E-ACT (EduTrust Academies Charitable Trust) in partnership with the local community Gainsborough Educational Village Trust. It was officially opened in June 2010 by the Duke of Gloucester.

In 2014 it was announced that following serious concerns being raised by Ofsted inspectors about its performance, the school would be put under a new sponsor. On 1 June 2014, the Academy became the Gainsborough Academy, under the sponsorship of the main local provider of further education, Lincoln College, and became part of the Lincoln College Group.

Having received an 'inadequate' grade from Ofsted and being put in special measures in December 2016, Gainsborough Academy changed sponsor again and moved to Wickersley Partnership Trust, its third sponsor in less than a decade, on 1 June 2018.
