= Sherwood Academy =

School in Gedling, Nottinghamshire, England

Location
- Wollaton Avenue; Nottingham, Nottinghamshire, NG4 4HX; England; 52°58′52″N 1°05′29″W

Information
- Type: Academy
- Established: 1969; 57 years ago
- Founder: Nottingham City Council
- Closed: 31 August 2016; 10 years ago
- Local authority: Nottinghamshire
- Trust: Redhill Academy Trust (2015–16); E-ACT (2012–15)
- Specialist: business
- Department for Education URN: 138365 Tables
- Ofsted: Reports
- Chair: Vacant
- Head teacher: Vacant
- Gender: Coeducational
- Age: 11 to 18
- Capacity: 937
- Website: sherwoodacademy.org.uk/

Sherwood Academy (formerly Sherwood E-ACT Academy, The Gedling School and Gedling Secondary Modern) was a secondary school with academy status located in the village of Gedling, Nottinghamshire, England. At its peak, it educated almost 1000 students, and at times, taught A-Levels, O-levels, GCSEs, and BTECs. In the 21st century, the school struggled with critical Ofsted reports, leading to several major changes in management. In 2016, was eventually closed due to financial insolvency.

== History ==
Throughout the 21st century, Gedling scored poorly in both grades and Ofsted reports, though did show some signs of improvement, and in 2007 lay just above the national average. Following an Ofsted inspection in September 2010, the school was given a Notice to Improve because of the school's lack of progress in improving weaknesses highlighted in a previous inspection. Due to the problems faced by the school, Nottinghamshire County Council announced in 2010 that it planned close the school in 2012.

In September 2012, E-ACT Academy Trust became the sponsor for the school, saving it from closure, and renamed it "Sherwood E-ACT Academy". In June 2014, it was announced that E-ACT was to be stripped of the academy by the government, and that the academy again faced the threat of closure By September 2014, the academy shut to years 7, 8 and 9 students, with only year 10 and 11 students remaining to finish their GCSEs. In April 2015, The Redhill Academy Trust took over control of the academy, renamed it "Sherwood Academy", and in September 2016, closed the school permanently. Demolition of the site commenced in June 2019 and was completed August of the same year. The site now stands vacant.

== See also ==
- List of schools in Nottinghamshire
- Department for Education
