= The Rodillian Academy =

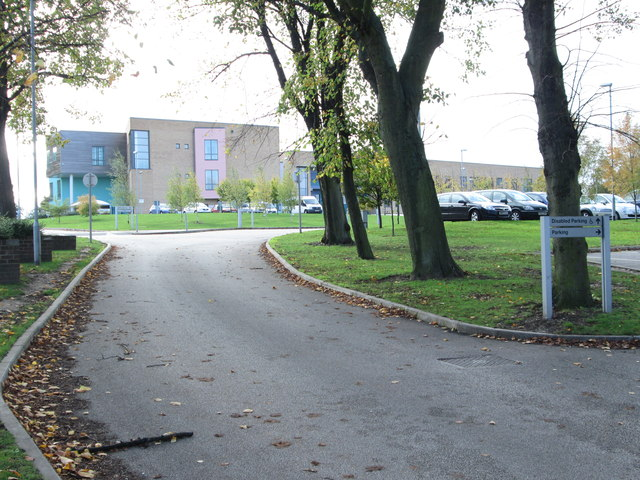
- The Rodillian Academy driveway from Long Thorpe Lane

Location
- Longthorpe Lane; Lofthouse, West Yorkshire, WF3 3PS; England; 53.73069°N 1.50237°W

Information
- Type: Academy
- Established: 1933
- Local authority: City of Leeds
- Specialist: Performing Arts College
- Department for Education URN: 138336 Tables
- Ofsted: Reports
- Gender: Mixed
- Age: 11 to 18
- Enrollment: 1,556 pupils
- Capacity: 1,700 Pupils
- Colours: Black & Green
- Website: www.rodillianacademy.co.uk

The Rodillian Academy (formerly Rodillian School) is a mixed secondary School and sixth form with academy status located in Lofthouse, West Yorkshire, England. The school has 1,556 pupils aged between 11 and 18. The school also has Specialist Arts College status. The name 'Rodillian' is derived from the name that was given to former pupils of the Rothwell Grammar School.

== History ==
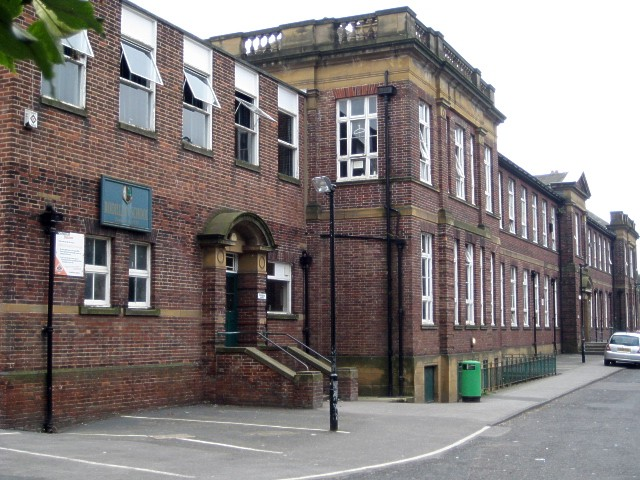
The former school building in 2008

The school was originally built in 1933 as Rothwell Grammar School to serve the needs of children in Rothwell and the surrounding areas. Edwin Robert Manley was headteacher from 1933 to 1965. He was active in local politics, and he wrote and self-published Meet the Miner.

In 2008 it moved into a £93 million building.

The school became an academy in summer 2012.

=== Rodillian Multi Academy Trust ===
In December 2013 the Rodillian Academy was approved by the Department for Education to become an academy sponsor. The Rodillian Multi Academy Trust was formed in September 2014 with the Rodillian Academy acting as the lead school in the trust that also includes The Featherstone Academy.

== Inspections ==
In the Ofsted inspection in 2016, the school's overall effectiveness was found to be 'good'. Both the effectiveness of the school's leadership and management and the personal development, behaviour and welfare pupils were judged to be outstanding.

As of 2024, the school's most recent inspection was in 2019, with an outcome of Good.

== Buildings ==
In September 2008, Rodillian moved to a newly built school as part of the Leeds BSF Project. At the new school are a lecture theatre, a library, sporting facilities including fitness centres and gyms, dance halls and PE classrooms. Part of the new build is a children's centre that allows for use of the school's sporting and educational facilities by children up to five years of age.

== Rugby ==
The school's main sport was Rugby Union.

== Academic performance ==
In 2023, the school's Progress 8 benchmark was average. 77% of children were entered for the English Baccalaureate, compared to 42% in the local authority area and 39% nationally. 40% of children achieved grades 5 or higher in English and mathematics GCSEs.

== Notable alumni ==
=== Rothwell Grammar School ===
- Jack Birkenshaw MBE, cricketer
- Richard Newby, Baron Newby OBE, politician, Liberal Democrat peer
- Ian McNaught-Davis, mountaineer and broadcaster
- Jean Denton, Baroness Denton of Wakefield, racing driver, businesswoman, Conservative government minister
- Sir Hugh Fish CBE, chemist responsible for the clean-up of the River Thames

== Notable teaching staff ==
- Harry Gration – journalist & broadcaster, former head of history
