= Big Brother (British TV series) series 17 =

Big Brother
- Series 17
- Series seventeen logo
- Presented by: Emma Willis
- No. of days: 50
- No. of housemates: 19
- Winner: Jason Burrill
- Runner-up: Hughie Maughan
- Companion shows: Big Brother's Bit on the Side
- No. of episodes: 50

Release
- Original network: Channel 5
- Original release: 7 June – 26 July 2016

Series chronology
- ← Previous; Series 16 Next → Series 18

Big Brother 2016, also known as Big Brother 17, is the seventeenth series of the British reality television series Big Brother, hosted by Emma Willis and narrated by Marcus Bentley. The series launched on 7 June 2016 on Channel 5 in the United Kingdom and TV3 in Ireland.

Rylan Clark-Neal continued to present the spin-off show Big Brother's Bit on the Side. It was the sixth regular series and the sixteenth series of Big Brother in total to air on Channel 5 to date.

This series was the first civilian edition to launch under the new three-year contract that was announced in March 2015 which guaranteed the show remained on Channel 5 until 2018.

On 1 July 2016, it was confirmed that the series length had been cut and that the final would air at the end of July 2016. It was confirmed the final would air on 26 July 2016, with a series length of 50 days. It was the shortest-running series of the civilian Big Brother at that point, however it was later surpassed by the twenty-first series on ITV, with a length of only 41 days.

On 26 July 2016, Jason Burrill was announced as the winner of the series with Hughie Maughan finishing as the series runner-up. At age 45, Jason became the oldest ever winner of the British franchise of Big Brother to date. He would hold this distinction until Big Brother 2025, when Richard Storry, aged 60, won the series.

== Housemates ==
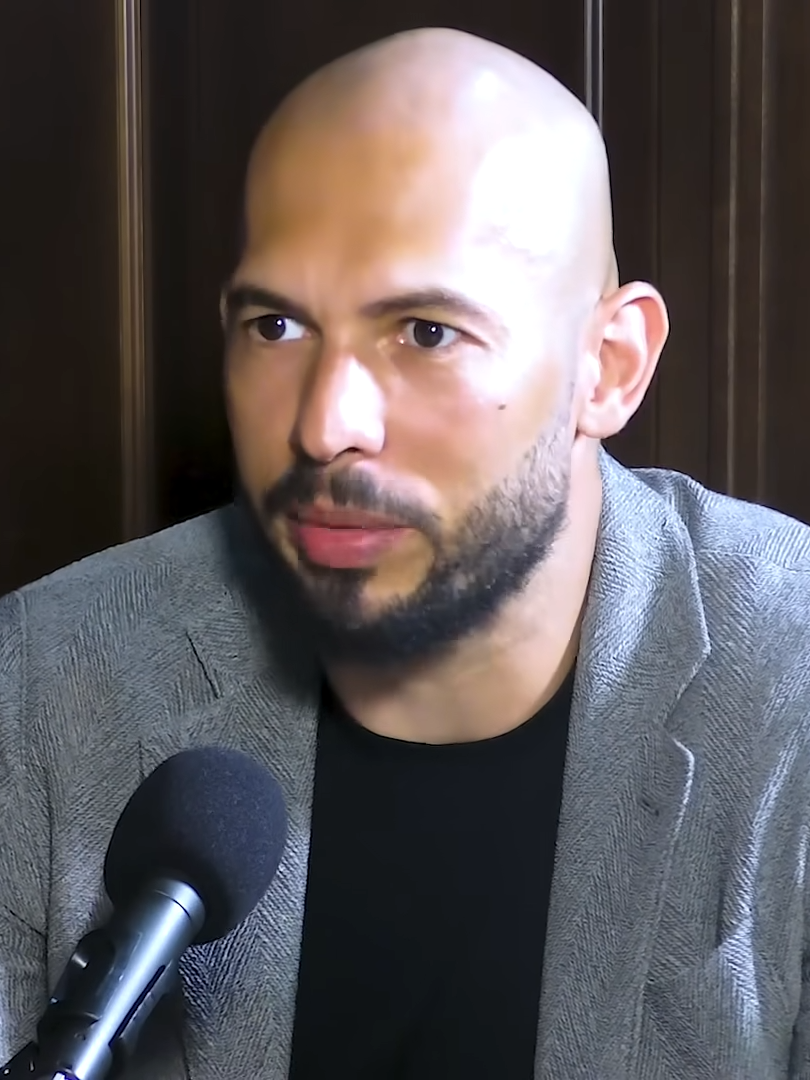
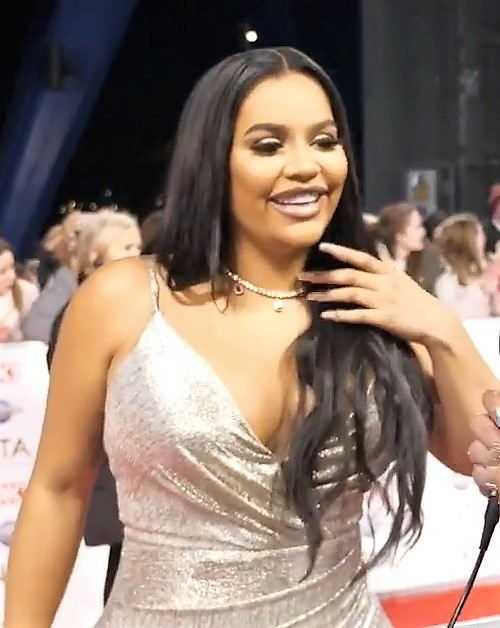
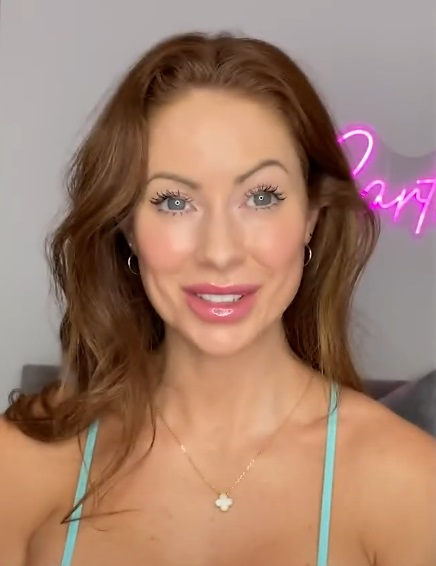
From left to right: Andrew Tate, Lateysha Grace and Laura Carter

On 1 June 2016, it was confirmed that the series would include two houses with an official statement from Channel 5 saying: "The Housemates live in the Big Brother house but they will have no idea of the dark and ominous force that is only metres away." In The Other House, The Others will be conspiring to target and take down the Housemates as they attempt to steal their place in the Big Brother House; and secure a chance of winning the £100,000 prize fund. Neither the Housemates nor The Others are aware that some of them are already connected to each other. Twelve housemates entered the Main House on Day 1, whilst 6 entered the Other House collectively known as The Others. The Houses merged on Day 13.

Name	Age on entry	Hometown	Day entered	Day exited	Result
Jason Burrill	45	Brighton	1	50	Winner
Hughie Maughan	21	Dublin	1	50	Runner-up
Jackson Blyton	24	Nottingham	1	50	3rd place
Andy West	34	Milton Keynes	1	50	4th place
Evelyn Ellis	20	London (originally from Australia)	1	50	5th place
Jayne Connery	49	Gerrards Cross	1	50	6th place
Sam Giffen	23	Blackpool	1	48	Evicted
Alex Cannon	27	Liverpool	1	48	Evicted
Laura Carter	30	London	1	46	Evicted
Ryan Ruckledge	24	Blackpool	1	39	Evicted
Lateysha Grace	23	Port Talbot	1	36	Evicted
Chelsea Singh	48	London	1	34	Evicted
Charlie Doherty	31	Folkestone	1	32	Evicted
Emma Jensen (Note: Emma and Victoria were classified as one Housemate until Victoria decided to leave on Day 5, after this Emma was classified as an individual Housemate.)	30	Chigwell	1	31	Ejected
Georgina Leigh-Cantwell	26	Kent	1	25	Evicted
Natalie Rowe	52	London	1	18	Evicted
Marco Pierre White Jr.	21	London	1	11	Evicted
Andrew Tate	29	Luton (originally from the United States)	1	8	Ejected
Victoria Jensen	30	Chigwell	1	5	Walked

=== Future Appearances ===
After returning to her home country, housemate and fifth place finalist Evelyn Ellis appeared on Married at First Sight Australia. Housemate Hughie Maughan went on to appear in many reality TV shows including The Challenge, Dancing with the Stars Ireland, Livin' with Lucy and First Dates Ireland.

== Main House and The Other House ==
- On Day 1, Alex, Andy, Chelsea, Emma & Victoria, Evelyn, Georgina, Jackson, Jason, Lateysha, Laura, Marco and Sam moved into the Main House, whilst Andrew, Charlie, Hughie, Jayne, Natalie and Ryan moved into the Other House.
- On Day 4, Alex and Jackson were chosen by The Others to evict, however this eviction was fake and they actually moved into the Other House. The public then voted for Andrew and Ryan to move into the Main House to complete a secret mission for The Others. If they pass their secret mission they will be awarded full Housemate status.
- On Day 8, following the conclusion of the first shopping task, The Others were asked to choose which housemate they believed to be the biggest horror. They chose Chelsea, and as a result he lost housemate status and moved to the Other House.
- On Day 9, Ryan failed his secret mission to get Laura nominated for eviction. He therefore returned to the Other House.
- On Day 13, the two Houses merged after two days of competing against each other. The Main House won the task and were granted with immunity.
- On Day 17, the Other House was used as a place for the Housemates to evacuate to following the Main House flooding.

	Day 1–4	Day 4–8	Day 8–9	Day 9–13
Jason	Main House			
Hughie	Other House			
Jackson	Main House	Other House		
Andy	Main House			
Evelyn	Main House			
Jayne	Other House			
Sam	Main House			
Alex	Main House	Other House		
Laura	Main House			
Ryan	Other House	Main House		Other House
Lateysha	Main House			
Chelsea	Main House		Other House	
Charlie	Other House			
Emma	Main House			
Georgina	Main House			
Natalie	Other House			
Marco	Main House			
Andrew	Other House	Main House		
Victoria	Main House			

== House flood ==
On Day 17, following a rainstorm, the Main House suffered a flood resulting in the evacuation of the housemates to the bedroom before being moved into the Other House. For the remainder of that day and the majority of Day 18, housemates were kept in the Other House whilst the Main House was being cleaned.

== Nominations table ==
	Week 1	Week 2	Week 3	Week 4	Week 5	Week 6			Week 7	Week 8 Final		Nominations received
	Week 1	Week 2	Week 3	Week 4	Week 5	Day 34	Day 36	Day 39	Week 7	Week 8 Final		Nominations received
Jason	Not eligible	Lateysha, Laura	Natalie, Hughie	Jayne, Lateysha	Ryan, Charlie	No nominations	Lateysha	Ryan	Jayne, Laura	Winner (Day 50)		8
Hughie	In Other; House		Not eligible	Andy, Jayne	Andy, Chelsea	No nominations	Not eligible	Laura	Jason, Andy	Runner-up (Day 50)		8
Jackson	Chelsea	In Other; House	Not eligible	Jayne, Andy	~~Emma~~, Charlie	No nominations	Not eligible	Laura	Jason, Evelyn	Third place (Day 50)		6
Andy	Not eligible	Emma, Evelyn	Charlie, Natalie	Georgina, Evelyn	Hughie, Lateysha	No nominations	Not eligible	Ryan	Laura, Hughie	Fourth place (Day 50)		18
Evelyn	Not eligible	Georgina, Andy	Jayne, Charlie	Georgina, Ryan	Chelsea, Jason	No nominations	Not eligible	Ryan	Jackson, Jason	Fifth place (Day 50)		6
Jayne	In Other; House		Not eligible	Andy, Chelsea	Chelsea, Jason	No nominations	Not eligible	Ryan	Jason, Jackson	Sixth place (Day 50)		15
Sam	Not eligible	Andy, Marco	Hughie, Natalie	Andy, Jayne	Chelsea, Ryan	No nominations	Not eligible	Nominated	Jason, Laura	Evicted (Day 48)		1
Alex	Andy	In Other; House	Not eligible	Andy, Jayne	Charlie, ~~Emma~~	No nominations	Not eligible	Laura	Laura, Jayne	Evicted (Day 48)		2
Laura	Lateysha	Georgina, Sam	Charlie, Hughie	Andy, Georgina	Jackson, Chelsea	No nominations	Not eligible	Nominated	Alex, Jackson	Evicted (Day 46)		7
Ryan	In Other; House	Exempt	Not eligible	Andy, Jayne	Chelsea, Andy	No nominations	Not eligible	Nominated	Evicted (Day 39)			3
Lateysha	Not eligible	Marco, Andy	Hughie, Natalie	Jayne, Andy	Chelsea, Jason	No nominations	Not eligible	Evicted (Day 36)				4
Chelsea	Not eligible	In Other; House	Not eligible	Jayne, Evelyn	Jayne, Evelyn	No nominations	Evicted (Day 34)					9
Charlie	In Other; House		Not eligible	Evelyn, Laura	~~Emma~~, Laura	Evicted (Day 32)						6
Emma	Not eligible	Georgina, Andy	Natalie, Hughie	Georgina, Jayne	Jackson, Jayne	Ejected (Day 31)						5
Georgina	Not eligible	Marco, Emma	Natalie, Hughie	Andy, Jayne	Evicted (Day 25)							8
Natalie	In Other; House		Not eligible	Evicted (Day 18)								6
Marco	Not eligible	Georgina, Andy	Evicted (Day 11)									3
Andrew	In Other; House	Ejected (Day 7)										N/A
Victoria	Not eligible	Walked (Day 5)										0
Notes	1	2, 3	4	none		5	6	7	8	9		
Against public vote	Andrew, Charlie, Hughie, Jayne, Natalie, Ryan	Andy, Emma, Georgina, Marco	Charlie, Hughie, Natalie	Andy, Evelyn, Georgina, Jayne	Charlie, Chelsea, Jason	none		Alex, Evelyn, Hughie, Jackson, Jason, Jayne, Laura, Ryan, Sam	Andy, Jackson, Jason, Laura	Alex, Andy, Evelyn, Hughie, Jackson, Jason, Jayne, Sam		
Walked	none	Victoria	none									
Ejected	none	Andrew	none		Emma	none						
Evicted	Alex & Jackson; The Others' choice to evict	Marco; Most votes to evict	Natalie; Most votes (out of 2) to evict	Georgina; Most votes (out of 2) to evict	Charlie; Most votes (out of 2) to evict	Chelsea; Housemates' choice to evict	Lateysha; Jason's choice to evict	Ryan; 4 of 7 votes (out of 3) to evict	Laura; Most votes (out of 2) to evict	Alex; Fewest votes (out of 8)	Andy; Fewest votes (out of 4)	
Evicted	Alex & Jackson; The Others' choice to evict	Marco; Most votes to evict	Natalie; Most votes (out of 2) to evict	Georgina; Most votes (out of 2) to evict	Charlie; Most votes (out of 2) to evict	Chelsea; Housemates' choice to evict	Lateysha; Jason's choice to evict	Ryan; 4 of 7 votes (out of 3) to evict	Laura; Most votes (out of 2) to evict	Sam; Fewest votes (out of 8)	Jackson; Fewest votes (out of 3)	
Evicted	Alex & Jackson; The Others' choice to evict	Marco; Most votes to evict	Natalie; Most votes (out of 2) to evict	Georgina; Most votes (out of 2) to evict	Charlie; Most votes (out of 2) to evict	Chelsea; Housemates' choice to evict	Lateysha; Jason's choice to evict	Ryan; 4 of 7 votes (out of 3) to evict	Laura; Most votes (out of 2) to evict	Jayne; Fewest votes (out of 6)	Jackson; Fewest votes (out of 3)	
Evicted	Andrew & Ryan; Most votes to move	Marco; Most votes to evict	Natalie; Most votes (out of 2) to evict	Georgina; Most votes (out of 2) to evict	Charlie; Most votes (out of 2) to evict	Chelsea; Housemates' choice to evict	Lateysha; Jason's choice to evict	Ryan; 4 of 7 votes (out of 3) to evict	Laura; Most votes (out of 2) to evict	Jayne; Fewest votes (out of 6)	Hughie; Fewest votes (out of 2)	
Evicted	Andrew & Ryan; Most votes to move	Marco; Most votes to evict	Natalie; Most votes (out of 2) to evict	Georgina; Most votes (out of 2) to evict	Charlie; Most votes (out of 2) to evict	Chelsea; Housemates' choice to evict	Lateysha; Jason's choice to evict	Ryan; 4 of 7 votes (out of 3) to evict	Laura; Most votes (out of 2) to evict	Evelyn; Fewest votes (out of 6)	Hughie; Fewest votes (out of 2)	
Evicted	Andrew & Ryan; Most votes to move	Marco; Most votes to evict	Natalie; Most votes (out of 2) to evict	Georgina; Most votes (out of 2) to evict	Charlie; Most votes (out of 2) to evict	Chelsea; Housemates' choice to evict	Lateysha; Jason's choice to evict	Ryan; 4 of 7 votes (out of 3) to evict	Laura; Most votes (out of 2) to evict	Jason; Most votes to win		

Notes

- ^Note 1: Throughout the first week, "The Others" targeted housemates in the Main House by nominating them for eviction. The nominated housemate would subsequently have to nominate another housemate to join them. On Day 1, The Others targeted Laura, who nominated Lateysha. On Day 2, The Others targeted Alex, who nominated Andy. On Day 3, The Others targeted Jackson, who nominated Chelsea. On Day 4, the Others had to evict two of the six nominees – they chose Alex and Jackson, unaware of the fact that they would actually move into the Other House with them. Following this, the public voted for Andrew and Ryan to take their place in the Main House, keeping the existence of the Other House a secret.
- ^Note 2: Emma and Victoria initially played as one housemate. However, after Victoria voluntarily left the game, Emma continued as an individual housemate.
- ^Note 3: After entering the Main House, Andrew and Ryan were told that, in order to earn housemate status, they had to assure that one housemate of their choice were nominated for eviction by the other housemates. After Andrew was ejected, Ryan had to carry out the mission alone. The Others collectively chose Laura as their target. Ryan could not nominate and could not be nominated by the housemates, as he was a 'new housemate'. Ryan failed the mission, and thus returned to the Other house.
- ^Note 4: The Main House and the Other House competed in a series of tasks in order to win immunity from eviction, and sole control over nominations. On Day 13, the Main House were revealed to have won the task, and the two houses merged.
- ^Note 5: This week was "Annihilation Week" where the Housemates were told that over the week there would be multiple evictions which they would be solely responsible for deciding. When the Housemate chosen was evicted, they left through the back door with no crowd or interview. Chelsea's eviction was determined by the housemates when they took it upon themselves to use a nominations-style approach - but as these weren't "official" nominations, they aren't listed.
- ^Note 6: On Day 35, the housemates chose to give Andy immunity for the rest of the week. On Day 36, the Housemates were gathered in Big Brother's deliberation room and were each stood in front of a button. They were told if they pressed their button they would receive £20,000 from the prize fund, but they would have to choose one of their fellow Housemates to evict. Jason pressed the button and evicted Lateysha.
- ^Note 7: On Day 37, the voting opened for the remaining housemates except Andy, in which the public voted to save. On Day 39 it was revealed that Laura, Ryan and Sam had received the fewest votes. Their fellow housemates then voted to evict one of the three.
- ^Note 8: As well as finding out who was nominated, the housemates were shown who nominated them. Jackson, Jason, Jayne and Laura received the most nominations; On Day 43 during a task, Sam was given the responsibility of saving a housemate and replacing them with someone of his choice. He chose to swap Jayne with Andy.
- ^Note 9: For the final week the public were voting for who they wanted to win, rather than to evict. A double eviction took place on Day 48 in which the two housemates with the fewest votes were evicted. They were Sam and Alex.

== Weekly summary ==
The main events in the Big Brother 17 house are summarised in the table below. A typical week begins with nominations, followed by the shopping task, and then the eviction of a Housemate during the live Friday episode. Evictions, tasks, and other events for a particular week are noted in order of sequence.

Week 1	Entrances	On Day 1, Marco, Emma & Victoria, Andy, Laura, Alex, Lateysha, Evelyn, Sam, Georgina, Jason, Jackson and Chelsea entered the House.; On Day 1, Andrew, Charlie, Hughie, Jayne, Natalie and Ryan, otherwise known collectively as The Others, entered the Other House.
Week 1	Tasks	On Day 2, the Housemates separated into two teams to take part in The Tree of Sin, the red team; Emma & Victoria, Georgina, Jackson, Jason, Lateysha and Marco, and the yellow team; Alex, Andy, Chelsea, Evelyn, Laura and Sam. Each teams were given a statement about a member of the other team to which they had to correctly identify who the statement was about. The Others watched this task from the Other House. As the red team won the task, they were rewarded with a party.
Week 1	Twists	On Day 1, under the ruse of a task, Big Brother asked the 12 Housemates to stand behind one of 12 podiums placed in the garden. Each podium had a character trait, and the Housemates had one minute to stand behind the trait that best fit them. They were unaware that the Others would select a trait and target the Housemate standing behind it. Laura's trait was targeted, and as punishment, she would face the first eviction. Furthermore, she had to nominate someone to join her, to which she chose Lateysha. The Others will then have to nominate two other Housemates, both of which must then nominate another Housemate each. The two Housemates evicted will not be decided by public vote, but by The Others. Unbeknownst to them, the two Housemates chosen to be evicted will be moved out of the Big Brother House and into The Other House. On Day 2, they targeted Alex, who in turn nominated Andy, and on Day 3 they nominated Jackson who then nominated Chelsea.; On Day 4, The Others were asked to choose two of the six nominated housemates to be evicted; they chose Alex and Jackson. However, they were fake evicted and actually moved to the Other House and lost their housemate status. In a further twist, the public voted Andrew and Ryan from the Other House to move into the Main House and compete in a secret mission.
Week 1	House switch	On Day 4, Alex and Jackson were evicted by The Others and moved to the Other House.; On Day 4, Andrew and Ryan were voted by the public and moved to the Main House.
Week 2	Tasks	On Day 6, the housemates were instructed to dress as Voodoo Scarecrows to take part in an endurance task to try and keep still for as long as possible whilst trying to maintain various punishments and distractions. However, in a twist they were unaware that The Others were the ones deciding who would face the punishments, and that it was Ryan's secret mission to ensure that the housemates failed the task by not remaining still. He failed this task.
Week 2	Twists	On Day 5, Andrew and Ryan were given their secret mission to target one of the housemates and ensure that that housemate is nominated for eviction this week. They chose to target Laura.
Week 2	Exits	On Day 5, Victoria walked from the house, leaving her twin Emma to continue as a solo housemate.; On Day 7, Andrew was removed from the house.; On Day 11, Marco became the first Housemate to be evicted.
Week 3	Exits	On Day 18, Natalie became the second Housemate to be evicted.
Week 4	Tasks	On Day 23, the House was turned into "BBCorps" offices where Chelsea was promoted to CEO whilst the others became office workers. As part of the task, the Housemates were forced to listen to customer complaints from viewers, as well as their nominations. To pass the task Housemates had to remain positive and give excellent customer feedback. Over the course of the day, Emma, Ryan and Sam were promoted to head office with Chelsea. The task continued into Day 24 where Georgina was promoted. It was later revealed that they won the task and therefore received the luxury shopping budget.
Week 4	Exits	On Day 25, Georgina became the third Housemate to be evicted.
Week 5	Tasks	On Day 27, for this week's shopping task the Housemates were given "BB loyalty points" to spend or to earn. Big Brother lined four Housemates up at a time and tempted them with a special gift, if the Housemates pressed their button they would receive the gift, however the House would lose loyalty points. However, if they refused the gift then the House would be rewarded loyalty points. These included food gifts, and temptations from friends and family. The task continued into Day 28 and Day 29. It was revealed at the end of the task that housemates needed to accrue 50 loyalty points to pass the task. With 0 points at task's end, housemates failed this week's task and received basic rations for the week.; On Day 31, Big Brother set Andy a secret task to tell fake historical facts to the Housemates and convince them that they are true. He passed this task.; On Day 32, Hughie and Ryan were asked to plan a pool party for their fellow housemates. However, in exchange for privileges at the party, they had to sacrifice party guests. They sacrificed Chelsea, Laura, Evelyn, Jason, Alex, and Andy.
Week 5	Exits	On Day 31, Emma was removed from the house after once again trying to break out.; On Day 32, Charlie became the fourth Housemate to be evicted.
Week 6: Annihilation Week	Twists	On Day 35, Andy was granted immunity from further Annihilation Week evictions.; On Day 36, the Housemates were gathered in Big Brother's deliberation room and were each stood in front of a button. They were told if they pressed their button they would receive £20,000 from the prize fund, but they would have to choose one of their fellow Housemates to evict. Jason pressed the button and evicted Lateysha.; On Day 39, Emma Willis entered the house to reveal Laura, Ryan and Sam had received the fewest public votes to save. The remaining housemates then voted to evict one. They chose Ryan.
Week 6: Annihilation Week	Exits	On Day 34, Chelsea became the first victim of Annihilation Week, and ultimately the fifth Housemate to be evicted.; On Day 36, Lateysha became the second victim of Annihilation Week, and ultimately the sixth Housemate to be evicted.; On Day 39, Ryan became the third victim of Annihilation Week, and ultimately the seventh Housemate to be evicted.
Week 7	Tasks	On Day 43, the Housemates played a trivia game with the questions based on their time in the house. A correct answer would move them up a level, with three correct answers taking them to the winner's platform where the Housemates would pick a numbered post between one and five, each containing a different prize which would be revealed after the task. At the end of the reveal Andy and Laura won nothing, Jackson won a spa treatment. Alex won a three course meal for two, and Sam won the responsibility of saving a nominated housemate and replacing them with somebody else. He chose to save Jayne and nominate Andy.; On Day 44, the Housemates were split into three teams. Jason, Jayne and Sam made up the green team, Alex, Laura and Hughie made up the red team, whilst Andy, Evelyn and Jackson were on the blue team. They had to build a bridge over the pool with materials provided and have one team member stand on it for 90 seconds, whilst other team members threw water balloons and wet sponges to try to throw them off balance. During the task Jayne had to leave the house due to injury, but returned later that day. For all teams competing in the task, Big Brother gave them letters from home.; On Day 46, the Housemates had to vote in the Big Brother Awards. They had to watch nominees in a series of different categories then vote for who they thought deserved the award.; On Day 47, the Housemates were split into two teams and entered "Big Brother's Courtroom" where each Housemate had to defend themselves from what they were being labelled. Their team members had to defend them, whilst opposing team members had to try and ensure a guilty verdict. Charlie, Chelsea, Georgina, Lateysha and Ryan returned as witnesses.
Week 7	Exits	On Day 46, Laura became the eighth Housemate to be evicted.
Week 8	Exits	On Day 48, in a twisted carnival, Big Brother revealed that Alex and Sam had the fewest votes to win and had failed to become finalists and were evicted.; On Day 50, Jayne and Evelyn left the house in sixth and fifth place respectively, whilst Andy finished in fourth. Jackson came third, and Jason was then announced as the winner leaving Hughie as runner-up.

== Production ==
=== House extension ===
On 2 February 2016, a planning application to Hertsmere Borough Council first revealed that Endemol had applied to build a new extension to the house, which would be its biggest renovation to the house since it was built in 2002. The documents teased a second house with another garden, as well as a new exterior set and interview studio. The old eviction set and eye studio were both demolished following the conclusion of Celebrity Big Brother 17. It was later announced on 18 March 2016 that permission had been granted with no objection. The new outdoor set will be smaller than before, holding a capacity of just 200 compared to 470 beforehand.

=== Eye logo ===
The official eye logo for the series was released with a 3-second teaser advert airing on Channel 5 on 17 May 2016. It was then posted online by presenters Willis and Clark-Neal. The eye is split, with black on one side and white on the other with shattered, coloured glass separating them down the middle.

=== Departures ===
On 9 March 2016, it was announced that Big Brother showrunner and Initial managing director Nick Samwell-Smith was to depart from the company in May. He was later succeeded by then-Initial creative director Mirella Breda.

On 20 May 2016, it was announced that Shannon Delwiche, an executive producer, was to depart and be replaced by Rebecca Kenney-Smith, having previously been Big Brother's series editor in 2015. It was also announced that Susy Price, co-creative director of Celebrity Big Brother 17 and member of the senior production team since 2011, was also to depart, leaving Katy Manley as the sole creative director.

=== Teasers ===
On 20 May 2016, a 20-second teaser aired on Channel 5 featuring both Emma Willis and Rylan Clark-Neal, also teasing that "The game is changing". First promotional pictures were also released the same day. On 26 May 2016, an extended 30-second teaser of the original teaser was aired on Channel 5. The teaser featured Emma Willis and Rylan Clark-Neal, teasing "The game is changing", "Nothing is as it seems" and "Get ready for an unseen force".

== Ratings ==
Official ratings are taken from BARB.

	Viewers (millions)							
	Week 1		Week 2	Week 3	Week 4	Week 5	Week 6	Week 7
Saturday		1.57	1.36	1.35	1.41	1.64	1.31	1.22
Sunday		1.67	1.48	1.52	1.49	1.45	1.55	1.68
Monday		1.54	1.52	1.46	1.7	1.72	1.63	1.7
Tuesday	1.86	1.57	1.55	1.56	1.62	1.82	1.72	1.82
Wednesday	1.86	1.62	1.62	1.78	1.66	1.79	1.59	
Thursday	1.77	1.5	1.64	1.56	1.59	1.8	1.83	
Friday	1.48	1.61	1.44	1.36	1.57	1.61	1.43	
Weekly average	1.64		1.52	1.51	1.58	1.69	1.58	1.61
Running average	1.64		1.59	1.57	1.57	1.59	1.59	1.59
Series average	1.59							
