= Laura Carter (actress) =

English actress (born 1985)

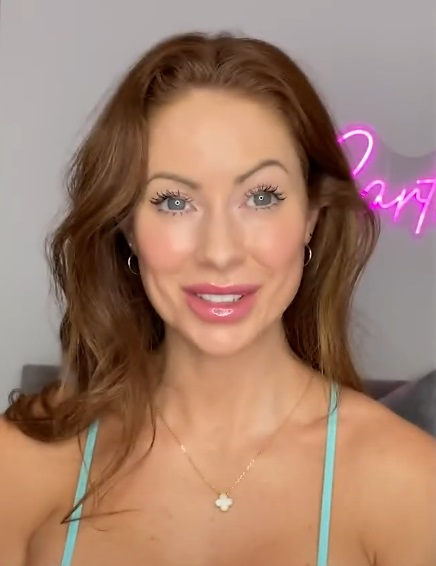
- Carter in 2022
- Born: 13 September 1985 (age 41); Bingley, England
- Education: Intake Performing Arts College
- Occupations: Actress; media personality; model; reality TV star
- Years active: 2008–present
- Television: Big Brother UK
- Partner: Anthony Lewis (2007–2014)

Laura Carter (born 13 September 1985) is an English actress, media personality, model and reality television star. She is best known for her appearance on the seventeenth series of Big Brother UK.

== Acting career ==
Carter is from Bingley, West Yorkshire, she studied drama at Intake Performing Arts College in Leeds in 2004.

Her first television credit was in 2008, in The Royal Today. She went on to have minor roles in multiple different television series including; Benidorm, Casualty, Doctors,Emmerdale, Holby City, Red Riding and The Syndicate. She also appeared in the Clean & Clear and Mentos advertisements.

In 2019, she landed a role in the crime drama film, Once Upon a time in London, playing Daisy. Carter claimed in a 2022 YouTube video, that her acting career ended after appearing on Big Brother.

== Modelling career ==
Carter appeared in multiple tabloids as a glamour model, mainly posing for Daily Star. She opened an OnlyFans account, but closed the page down in 2025, after opening her own business.

In 2020, Carter was on the cover and posed nude for Playboy magazine.

== Television career ==
In 2015, Carter appeared as a cast member in E4's reality television series, Young, Free & Single.

In 2016, Carter entered the seventeenth series of Big Brother UK. During her time on the show, she had sex with controversial media personality, Marco Pierre White Jr, whom she had met prior to entering the house. She also got in to a verbal altercation with British media personality and former escort, Natalie Rowe. She was evicted on Day 46, placing ninth overall.

Following her appearance on Big Brother, she appeared as a guest on daytime talk show Loose Women, to discuss her time on the show.

In 2022, Carter spoke out publicly, claiming Big Brother, had ruined her life. She claimed she suffered from insomnia due to fear of being watched years after the show finished.

== Filmography ==
Film and television
Year	Title	Role	Notes
2008	The Royal Today	Charlotte Winters	1 episode
2009	Red Riding	Yorkshire Post Receptionist	
2010	Emmerdale	Beth	1 episode
2012	The Syndicate	Chloe	1 episode
2013	Make it Plumb	Carole Sayer	TV film
2013	Benidorm	Prostitute	1 episode
2013	Holby City	Katie Clements	1 episode
2013	Casualty	Angie Taylor	1 episode
2015	Young, Free & Single	Self; cast member	8 episodes
2016	Big Brother UK series 17	Self; housemate	9th place, 47 episodes
2016	Big Brother's Bit on the Side	Self; ex-housemate	1 episode
2016	Loose Women	Self; guest	1 episode
2017	Doctors	Laura Barton	1 episode
2018	Dead Ringer	Jacquie	
2019	Once Upon a time in London	Daisy	
2025	The Doll	Kelly	
2025	Love Island: Aftersun	Self; audience member	1 episode
