= West Walsall E-ACT Academy =

E-ACT West Walsall Academy

Location
- Primley Avenue; Walsall, West Midlands, WS2 9UA; England; 52.5821°N 2.0098°W

Information
- Other name: WWEA
- Former name: Alumwell Business and Enterprise College
- Type: Academy
- Established: 1971
- Local authority: Walsall Council
- Trust: E-ACT
- Department for Education URN: 138374 Tables
- Ofsted: Reports
- Head teacher: Laura Wilson
- Gender: Mixed
- Age range: 11–18
- Enrolment: 1,186
- Capacity: 1,100
- Website: westwalsallacademy.e-act.org.uk

E-ACT West Walsall Academy (WWA, formerly Alumwell Business and Enterprise College) is an 11–18 mixed secondary school and sixth form with academy status in Walsall, West Midlands, England.

It was a community school that was established in 1971 and had Business and Enterprise College status since September 2003. It adopted its present name after becoming an academy in 2012.

== History ==
=== Origins ===
Alumwell Business and Enterprise College opened on land owned by the Earl of Bradford, in September 1971 as Wilfred Clark Comprehensive School, an 11-18 school formed by the amalgamation of four secondary modern schools.

The school was built with a planned capacity of 1,250 on a budget £567,699. Councillor Wilfred Clarke, chairman of the education committee, initially wanted the school to host a new 'super stadium' for the town, but plans were shelved on cost grounds.

Initially named Wilfred Clark Comprehensive School after the then chairman of the Walsall MBC education committee, Councillor Wilfred Clark, the name proved controversial. On its first day of opening, the new school's signage was covered up with 'Alumwell Comprehensive School', with locals unhappy at the council's policy of naming new schools after sitting councillors.

Some of the school's supporters saw amalgamation as a way to mitigate increased post-war immigration into Walsall, with the headmaster of Hilary Street School (a predecessor school) hopeful that an amalgamated school would "overcome any concentration of immigrant pupils" in Walsall schools. Councillor Clarke, the school's initial namesake and a vocal supporter of Enoch Powell's repatriation policies, had voiced fears over the impact of immigration on school standards.

=== As Alumwell Comprehensive School ===
It was the first school in Walsall to be designed with out-of-hours community users in mind: a vision of the then Director of Education, Mr. R. D. Nixon, which, for a time, brought visits from education officers from all over England. Since September 1974, and prior to its present appellation, it has been known as the Alumwell Comprehensive School, (briefly) Alumwell Community School, and the Alumwell School. The annexe in Scarborough Road (used for years 7 and 8, and some year 9 subjects) was closed in July 1991 due to a decline in pupil numbers, and taken over by Walsall College (WALCAT).

Its first headteacher, until 1974, was Mr. Leslie Cox. His successor was Mr. Eugene M. Hughes, who served the school for 18 years until 1992, when he was succeeded by Miss Susan M. Bradford, who served the school for a similarly long period before leaving in December 2009 having gained a number of quality marks for the school, in particular, Investors in People. Andy Hubble became Headteacher in 2010, and was appointed Principal of the newly formed academy in 2012, until his resignation in February 2014 following an Ofsted inspection that ruled that the school's overall effectiveness was 'inadequate'. In the interim, Patrick Ottley-O’Connor, former Principal of Oasis Academy MediaCityUK in Salford has assumed the role of Interim Principal. Mr Ottley O'Connor left Oasis Academy MediaCityUK in mysterious circumstances after Christmas 2014.

== Campus ==
The school has extensive sports facilities including a football/athletics field, eight tennis courts, a heated swimming pool, a gym, a large Astroturf and, a significantly large sports hall. It also had a theatre.

There would have been a substantial rebuilding as a result of the school's participation in Building Schools for the Future, but this fell through following the general election of 2010.

However, a new building opened on the site in 2012 called the Innovation Centre. The building was initially used by the academy for some Post-16 lessons, such as Psychology and Law, while also serving as a local business venue with its meeting rooms and other facilities. However, in September 2013, the building became solely dedicated to Post-16 provision and is now the Post-16 Centre.
