= Joseph Leckie Academy =

Location
- Walstead Road West; Walsall, West Midlands, WS5 4PG; England; 52°33′55″N 1°58′52″W

Information
- Former names: Joseph Leckie School, Joseph Leckie CTC
- Type: Academy
- Motto: Leadership, Empathy, Community, Kindness, Integrity & Environment (LECKIE)
- Established: 1939
- Specialist: Technology
- Department for Education URN: 137830 Tables
- Ofsted: Reports
- Principal: Andrew McNaughton
- Staff: 528
- Gender: Mixed
- Age: 11 to 18
- Enrolment: 1583
- Colour: Mixed
- Slogan: Learn Together, Lead Together
- Website: www.josephleckieacademy.co.uk

Converter AcademyJoseph Leckie Academy is a secondary academy school in The Delves area of Walsall in the West Midlands, England. It is situated to the south of Walsall centre, near to the Bescot Stadium, home of Walsall F.C.

== History ==
Until 2012 the school was called Joseph Leckie Community Technology College Or Also Known As Joseph Leckie CTC.

Construction of the school began in 1938 and was completed in August 1939 at a cost of £62,993. It was planned to open as Fullbrook Senior Boys' and Girls' School. However, After the death of Joseph Alexander Leckie, a politician who had been Mayor of Walsall, Chairman of the Education Committee and Member of Parliament for Walsall, the Education Committee renamed the school in memory of him.

On 1 February 2012, the school became an Academy and began using the name Joseph Leckie Academy or Also Known As JLA/Leckie.

== School buildings ==
The 2007 Ofsted inspection noted the poor state of school buildings. Students made a film showing the extent to which the buildings needed work, and the rat and masonry problems. This was presented to the Schools Minister Andrew Adonis, Baron Adonis and prompted a visit to the school by the education minister Jacqui Smith.

In June 2009 a £6 million teaching block named the Colin Beilby Building (CBB) completed full construction in a mission to refresh the outdated and asbestos infested buildings phase by phase, the Keith Whittlestone Building (KWB) originally opened to students since 2016 was also opened as Phase 1 of the rebuilding of the school, funded by the Building Schools for the Future initiative. Phase 2 named the Keith Whittlestone Building 2 (KWB2) started construction in January 2018 and was completed in early 2021.

In May 2021, the school was featured in the media for having used the identical flammable Kingspan cladding system as used on the Grenfell Tower.

== Ofsted inspections ==
An inspection by Ofsted in 2007 judged the school to be Satisfactory but noted that there were problems with staff recruitment and retaining staff. In 2009 the school was judged Good. After becoming an academy, the school was again judged Good in 2013. then in 2017 the school was judged as Requires Improvement due to crumbling buildings known as the South and West blocks one of which the South Block has recently been demolished and replaced by the brand new KWB2 block. And finally, as of 2021, the most recent inspection was followed with a judgement of Good once again.
