= Redhill Academy =

The Redhill Academy

Location
- Redhill Road; Arnold, Nottinghamshire, NG5 8GX; England; 53°00′33″N 1°07′51″W

Information
- Type: Academy
- Established: October 1948
- Trust: Redhill Academy Trust (from 2011)
- Department for Education URN: 136361 Tables
- Ofsted: Reports
- Chair: The Redhill Academy Trust
- Principal: Andrew Burns
- Head teacher: Mike Hardy
- Gender: Coeducational
- Age: 11 to 18
- Enrolment: 1575
- Houses: Cavendish, Hunloke, Kenning, Turburt, Gladwin.
- Colours: Blue, Green, Red, Purple, Yellow and Orange
- Publication: Redhill Review
- Website: www.theredhillacademy.org.uk

Redhill Academy is a secondary school and sixth form with academy status, situated on Redhill Road in Arnold, Nottinghamshire, England.

The school has around 1,575 pupils, 360 of which are sixth form AS/A2 level students. The head teacher is Mike Hardy.

== History ==
The school had an arson attack on Sunday 28 February 1982, which gutted seven classrooms.

== Academic performance ==
The school teaches GCSE and A level. In 2008, Redhill Academy was confirmed as a high performing specialist school, specialising in science and performing arts.

2008 also saw the academy becoming rated "outstanding" by Ofsted. 2013 also saw the academy again being rated ‘outstanding’ by Ofsted. Redhill Academy is now a Lead Partner School. Last inspected in 2024 resulted in a third 'outstanding' rating.

== Notable former students ==
=== Redhill Comprehensive School ===
- Andrea Lowe, actress

=== Redhill Academy ===
- Amy and Ella Meek, environmental activists

== See also ==
- Carlton Academy
