= Killisick =

Area of the town of Arnold, Nottinghamshire, England

Coordinates: 53.006°N 1.116°W

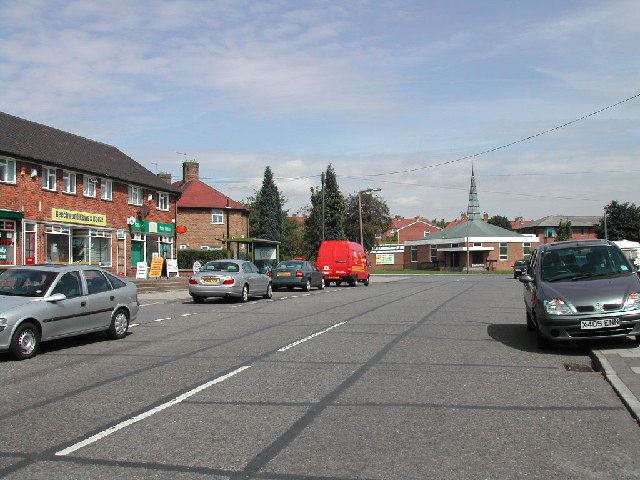
- Beechwood Road in 2005

- Location within Nottinghamshire
- Population: 2,595 (2011)
- OS grid reference: SK 59310 45809
- Civil parish: unparished
- District: Borough of Gedling
- Shire county: Nottinghamshire
- Region: East Midlands
- Country: England
- Sovereign state: United Kingdom
- Post town: Nottingham
- Postcode district: NG5
- Dialling code: 0115
- Police: Nottinghamshire
- Fire: Nottinghamshire
- Ambulance: East Midlands
- UK Parliament: Gedling

Killisick is an area of the market town of Arnold in the ceremonial county of Nottinghamshire in the East Midlands of England. It also used to be a local government ward area of Gedling borough until 2015. The population of the ward as it stood at the 2011 census was 2,595. The area is currently contained within the newly created Coppice ward.

The area is mostly residential, and contains a few shops and a John Lewis & Partners depot. It borders with Mapperley, Arnold town centre and Woodthorpe. As a ward, Killisick shared borders with the wards known as: Mapperley Plains; Lambley; Woodborough; St. Mary's; Calverton; and Kingswell.

== Education ==
The area contains three primary schools: Killisick Junior School; Pinewood Infant School and Foundation Unit; and Robert Mellors Primary School.

There are no secondary schools in Killisick, but Arnold Hill Academy, Christ the King Catholic Voluntary Academy and Redhill Academy are nearby.

== Recreation ==
Killisick Recreation Ground lies outside Killisick, alongside the area's eastern boundary. The ground contains a playground, an outdoor gym, two grass football pitches and a smaller, fenced tarmac pitch. A funfair is held on the ground every year.

Killisick Community Centre is on Killisick Road.

== Bus services ==
Bus services in Killisick include Nottingham City Transport's Lime Line 56, 56B, 57, 58 and 59.

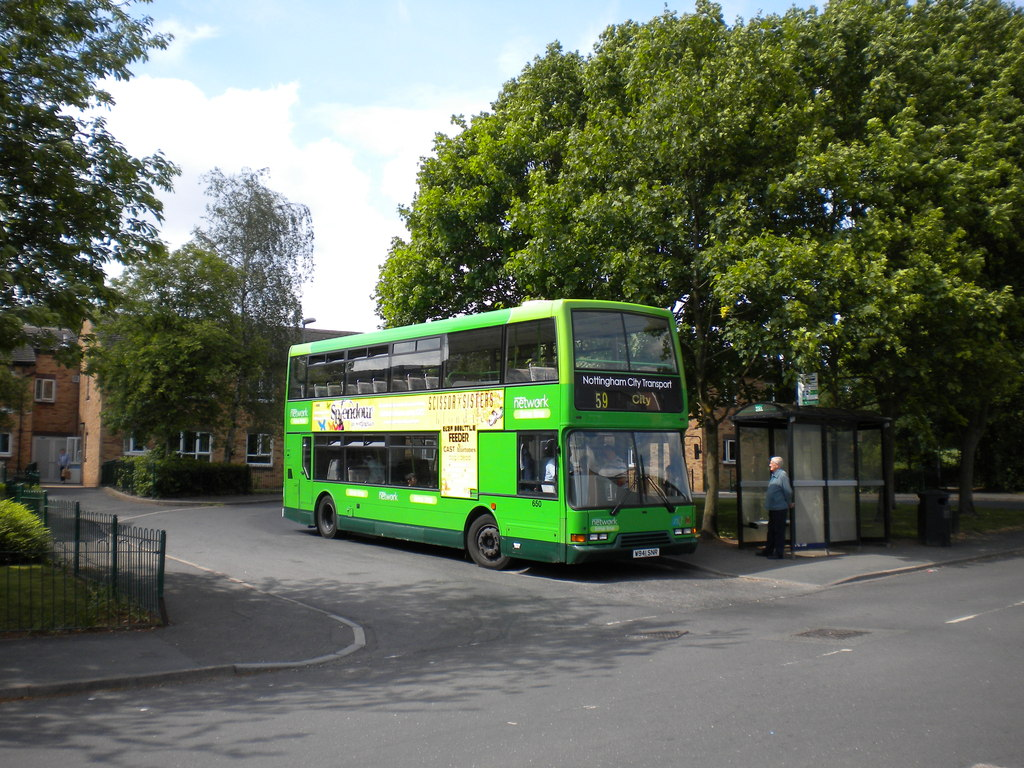
Nottingham City Transport Lime Line 59 bus at Gleneagles Drive terminus, 2011

- 56: Nottingham – Mansfield Road – Plains Estate – Arnold

The 56 covers Ramsey Drive, Coppice Road and Gedling Road.

- 56B: Somersby Road, Arnold – Plains Estate – Front Street, Arnold

The 56B covers Ramsey Drive, Coppice Road and Gedling Road..

- 58: Nottingham – Mansfield Road – Arnold – Killsick

The 58 covers Killisick Road, Homefield, and Surgeys Lane.

- 59: Nottingham – Mansfield Road – Arnold – Killsick

The 59 covers Howbeck Road, Rolleston Drive, and Sandfield Road.
