= Grace Hodgett Young =

British actress and singer

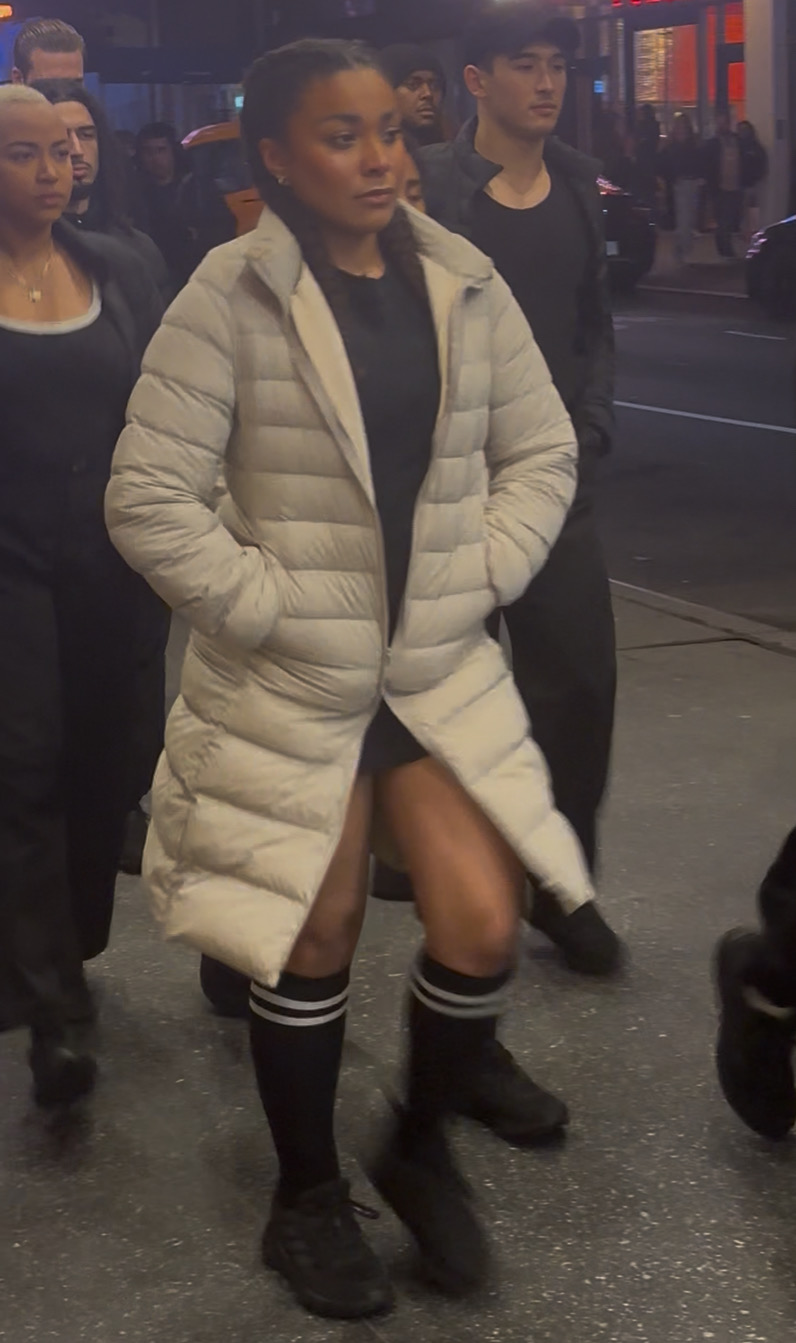
- Hodgett Young performing as Betty Schaefer on 44th Street, March 2025
- Born: Grace Louise Hodgett Young; 2002-2003; Nottingham, England
- Education: Mountview Academy of Theatre Arts (BA)
- Occupations: Actress and singer
- Years active: 2023–present

Grace Louise Hodgett Young (born 2002-2003) is an English actress and singer. She is known for her roles on the West End and Broadway stages, especially her breakthrough role as Betty Schaefer in Jamie Lloyd’s revival of Sunset Boulevard.

== Early life ==
Grace Hodgett Young was born in Nottingham and grew up in the suburb of Arnold. She was inspired to pursue a theatre career at age nine, after seeing her sister perform with Nottingham's Spotlight Theatre Company. Hodgett Young attended Christ the King Catholic Voluntary Academy and pursued a BTEC Extended Diploma in Performing Arts at Bilborough College. She went on to graduate from Mountview Academy of Theatre Arts.

== Career ==
Hodgett Young made her professional stage debut as Betty Schaefer in Sunset Boulevard at the Savoy Theatre on the West End under the direction of Jamie Lloyd, a role which earned her the WhatsOnStage Award for Best Professional Debut and a nomination for the Laurence Olivier Award for Best Actress in a Supporting Role in a Musical. After starring as Eurydice in the West End premiere of Hadestown for six months, she reprised her role as Betty Schaefer in the 2024 Broadway production of Sunset Boulevard at the St. James Theatre, which marked her Broadway debut. She played her final performance in Sunset Boulevard on July 13, 2025, a week before the production ended.

In 2025, she made her screen debut in BBC's What It Feels Like for a Girl.

== Stage ==
Year	Title	Role	Venue
2023–2024	Sunset Boulevard	Betty Schaefer	Savoy Theatre, West End
2024	Hadestown	Eurydice	Lyric Theatre, West End
2024–2025	Sunset Boulevard	Betty Schaefer	St. James Theatre, Broadway
2026	Punch	Nicola/Teacher/Clare	UK tour
2026	Othello	Bianca	UK tour

== Screen ==
Year	Title	Role	Episode	Channel
2025	What It Feels Like For A Girl	Bartender	Episode 1	BBC
