= Alfred Anthony =

Alfred Anthony may refer to:

- Alfred W. Anthony (1860–1939), American author, Freewill Baptist leader and religion professor
- Alfred Anthony (cricketer) (1841–1900), English cricketer
- Alfred Webster Anthony (1865–1939), American mining engineer and a collector of natural history specimens
