= John Barnsdale =

English cricketer and footballer

Personal information
- Full name: John Davison Barnsdale
- Born: 24 May 1878; Arnold, Nottinghamshire, England
- Died: 5 August 1960 (aged 82); Lower Bourne, Farnham, Surrey, England
- Batting: Right handed
- Role: Wicket-keeper

Domestic team information
- Years: Team
- 1905: Nottinghamshire
- First-class debut: 8 June 1905 Nottinghamshire v Oxford University

Career statistics
Competition	FC
Matches	1
Runs scored	10
Batting average	5
100s/50s	0/0
Top score	10
Balls bowled	–
Wickets	–
Bowling average	–
5 wickets in innings	–
10 wickets in match	–
Best bowling	–
Catches/stumpings	0/1
- Source: CricketArchive, 30 May 2020

John Davison Barnsdale (24 May 1878 – 5 August 1960) was an English cricketer and footballer. He was a right-handed batsman and wicket-keeper who played for Nottinghamshire.

Born in Arnold, Nottinghamshire, Barnsdale was educated at Nottingham High School, Sedbergh School and Trinity Hall, Cambridge. He played club cricket with Nottingham Forest CC and Magdala CC. He also played 25 matches in the Football League First Division as a half-back for Nottingham Forest in 1904 and 1905. He was a director of the Raleigh Bicycle Company and served as a major in the Lancashire Fusiliers.

Barnsdale made just one first-class appearance, against Oxford University at the University Parks on 8 June 1905. He scored a duck in the first innings of the match and ten runs in the second, and took one stumping. His first-innings dismissal came courtesy of William Evans, for whom Barnsdale's wicket was one of a hat-trick.

Barnsdale was a tailend batsman.

He became a farmer when he moved to Frensham, Surrey, where he retired. He died on 5 August 1960 in Lower Bourne, Farnham, Surrey at the age of 82 years.
