= Dorket Head =

Area in Nottinghamshire, England

Coordinates: 53.02°N 1.12°W

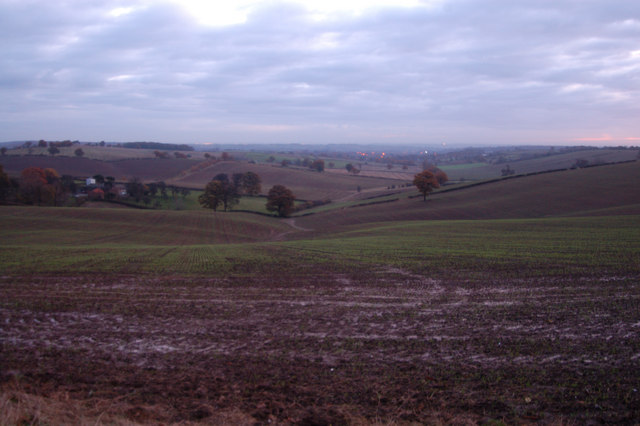
- A view from the area in 2008

- Location within Nottinghamshire
- OS grid reference: SK594475
- District: Gedling
- Shire county: Nottinghamshire
- Region: East Midlands
- Country: England
- Sovereign state: United Kingdom
- Post town: NOTTINGHAM
- Postcode district: NG5
- Dialling code: 0115
- Police: Nottinghamshire
- Fire: Nottinghamshire
- Ambulance: East Midlands
- UK Parliament: Gedling (UK Parliament constituency)

Dorket Head is the name of the immediate area surrounding the junction of Lime Lane and Calverton Road in the town of Arnold, Nottinghamshire.

It is the highest point in the Nottingham area at 146 metres (479 ft) above sea level, although not the highest in the county, which distinction may belong to either Silverhill (SK4762) near Teversal, or to Newtonwood Lane, near Whiteborough Farm on the Derbyshire county boundary (SK4560), both of which are a little over 204 metres (about 670 ft).

== Toponymy ==
The name 'Dorket Head' first appears on the one inch Ordnance Survey map of c. 1825. Mentions before that time refer to variations of 'Dalegate', so it appears as Dalegate in an early 13th century charter in the British Museum, Dalgate-heved in the Rufford Cartulary and Dallegate hevedgrene in the 1602 Wollaton Forest Book.

This is a Scandinavian place-name from the Old Norse dalr , 'valley' and gata , 'road', which references the road which runs up the valley here from Arnold towards Calverton, and 'head' meaning the uppermost or furthermost portion of a valley.

== Archaeology ==
From 1973 to 1991, in excavations at Dorket Head and Cockpit Hill (in Ramsdale Park to the north), the Sherwood Archaeological Society uncovered apparent Roman fortification ditches and also Late Bronze Age/Early Iron Age pottery, together with Late Iron Age pottery.

== Other ==
FCC Environment has a landfill site at Dorket Head. Opened in 1993, it has planning permission for the disposal of non-hazardous waste and is a part of Nottinghamshire County Council's 'Waste Core Strategy' plan for dealing with the county's waste. Around 2.5 megawatts (3,400 horsepower) of electricity is generated every day at Dorket Head from burning the gas which is produced as the waste degrades and breaks down. The Ibstock Brick Company, which quarries clay for use in the manufacture of bricks, is also at the site. Once quarrying has finished in an area of the site, it is used for landfill.
