= George Anthony (cricketer) =

Player for Nottinghamshire County Cricket Club 1900–1905

Personal information
- Full name: George Anthony
- Born: 25 June 1875; Arnold, Nottinghamshire, England
- Died: 13 May 1907 (aged 31); Arnold, Nottinghamshire, England
- Batting: Right handed
- Bowling: Right-arm fast-medium
- Relatives: Henry Anthony (brother); Alfred Anthony (uncle)

Domestic team information
- Years: Team
- 1900–1905: Nottinghamshire
- First-class debut: 2 August 1900 Nottinghamshire v Leicestershire
- Last First-class: 12 June 1905 Nottinghamshire v Surrey

Career statistics
Competition	FC
Matches	85
Runs scored	1722
Batting average	15.23
100s/50s	0/7
Top score	89
Balls bowled	5594
Wickets	82
Bowling average	31.93
5 wickets in innings	3
10 wickets in match	0
Best bowling	6/72
Catches/stumpings	32/–
- Source: CricketArchive, 12 September 2008

George Anthony (25 June 1875 – 13 May 1907) was an English first-class cricketer. He made 85 appearances for Nottinghamshire between August 1900 and June 1905, scoring 1722 runs and taking 82 wickets. He died just two years after making his last first-class appearance, at the age of 31. He made his best score, 89, against Derbyshire while his best bowling, 6 for 72, came against Leicestershire. His brother, Henry Anthony and uncle Alfred Anthony also played for Nottinghamshire, with rather less distinction. His brother Walter Anthony won a football championship medal with Blackburn Rovers in 1912.
