= The Becket School =

The Becket RC School

Location
- The Becket Way; West Bridgford, Nottinghamshire, NG2 7QY; England; 52.91855°N 1.16031°W

Information
- Type: Academy
- Motto: Labore est orare – To work is to pray
- Religious affiliation: Roman Catholic
- Established: Original Foundation 1929
- Founder: Mr M Afaq
- Department for Education URN: 137409 Tables
- Ofsted: Reports
- Headmaster: Paul Greig
- Gender: Mixed-sex
- Age: 11 to 18
- Enrolment: 1,049
- Houses: Bernadette, Edmund, Nicholas, Patrick, Robert, Teresa
- Colours: Purple, red, orange, green, blue, yellow
- Website: www.becketonline.co.uk

The Becket School is a co-educational secondary Catholic school with academy status in West Bridgford, Nottinghamshire, England. It was formed in 1976 by the amalgamation of two schools, Corpus Christi Bi-Lateral School and Becket Grammar School for Boys. It is one of three Catholic secondary schools in the Nottingham Urban Area area, along with Christ the King and Trinity School.

The school moved to its new site, on Wilford Lane, at the beginning of the 2009–10 school year and lies within the Diocese of Nottingham and the Parish of the Holy Spirit, West Bridgford.

The school has a large catchment area covering parts of the City of Nottingham, Nottinghamshire and south-eastern Derbyshire, including such places as St Ann's, Carlton, Clifton, Long Eaton and West Bridgford. For Years 7 to 11 there are six forms, designated by the initial letters, B, E, N, P, R, and T, of six saints: Bernadette Soubirous, Edmund Campion, Nicholas Garlick, Patrick, Robert Ludlam and Thérèse of Lisieux.

== History ==
Becket Grammar School was founded in 1929 by two priests (Fr Aidan Kenny and Fr Bede Horwood) from the Order of the Augustinians of the Assumption. The school was for boys only and was based on Wilford Lane, next to the suspension bridge over the River Trent. The Becket School was at that time an independent boys' grammar school. In 1958, about two miles away along Wilford Lane, Corpus Christi school opened under headmaster Arthur Davis as a mixed bilateral school for pupils 11 to 16+, offering Grammar, Technical and Secondary Modern courses. The school was planned by Reginald W Cooper of Nottingham, and was built by A Mason Ltd of Mansfield. It cost approximately £100,000.

In 1975, there were only two priests of the Assumption Order still at the Becket school; the headteacher, Father Roger Killeen and his bursar. At that time, the Order gave The Becket School to the Diocese of Nottingham and the two schools, The Becket and Corpus Christi, were amalgamated. The heads of the two schools, Father Roger and Mr Arthur Davis, who were in post at that time gave up their headships to enable the amalgamation to go ahead. A new headteacher, Terence Dillon, was appointed to the new school in 1975 and carried out the bringing together of the two very different institutions into one successful school. The school governors decided to call the new school The Becket Comprehensive School, though the term Comprehensive has rarely been used. The new headmaster took on the challenge of creating one school, whilst some parents of the former Becket School endeavoured to resist any changes as they sought to protect the privileged position of their sons. The new headteacher managed to bring staff together on the two sites of the former schools and created a school which became pre-eminent in Nottingham during the 1970s and 1980s and continues to hold a favoured position. Terence Dillon moved from the school in 1984 to become one of Her Majesty's Inspectors of Schools. The buildings of the original schools were demolished in the summer of 2012 to be replaced by a brand new school on Wilford Lane. During the period 1929–1968, the Becket School enjoyed a close association with the Order's other school, St Michael's College, Hitchin, with which there was frequent interchange of staff in the years before amalgamation.

During the 1960s, 70s and 80s the school was particularly renowned for its sporting achievements at a national level, producing several national schoolboy champions in both athletics and rowing.

A new school site was constructed from 2007 to 2009 on Gresham Fields, Wilford Lane, situated between the three previous sites, and opened on 15 September 2009. The project cost was £24.5 million. There was also fund raising by the school and local parishes to raise £100,000 for the new school building to have a Chapel.

== Notable alumni ==
- Simon Mitton (b. 1946) - astronomer, Life Fellow, St Edmund's College, Cambridge
- John Whelpton (b. 1950) - historian of Nepal
- Luke Dimech (b. 1977) - footballer, Malta national football team
- Jermaine Jenas (b. 1983) - footballer, Nottingham Forest F.C., Tottenham Hotspur F.C., England national football team
- Matt Forde (b. 1982) - Comedian
- Aisling Loftus (b. 1990) - actress
- Mary Earps (b. 1993) - footballer, Manchester United W.F.C., England women's national football team
- Hayley Bishop, actress
- James Belshaw - Notts County Goalkeeper

=== Becket Grammar School ===
- Prof John Carey, literary critic, emeritus Merton Professor of English Literature at the University of Oxford (attended as a wartime evacuee)
- Michael Jayston (b. 1935) - film and TV actor
- John Jenkins (b. 1955) - diplomat, UK Ambassador to Syria (2006–7), Burma (1999-2002)
- Stephen Marley (b. 1950) - novelist
- Chris Maslanka (b. 1954) - writer and broadcaster
- Prof Stephen Shennan - archaeologist, Director of the Institute of Archaeology at University College London (2005–2014)
- John Vernon, long and triple jumper, the husband of Judy Vernon, who ran in the women's 4x100m final of the 1972 Summer Olympics
