= Arnold Hill Academy =

Coordinates: 52.9972°N 1.1168°W

Arnold Hill Spencer Academy

Location
- Gedling Road; Arnold, Nottinghamshire, NG5 6NZ; England

Information
- Type: Academy
- Established: 18 December 1959
- Trust: Spencer Academy Trust (formerly Trent Academies Group)
- Department for Education URN: 146562 Tables
- Ofsted: Reports
- Head teacher: Matt Robertson
- Gender: Coeducational
- Age: 11 to 18
- Enrolment: 1501 as of December 2017
- Colour: Green
- Website: arnoldhillspencer.com

Arnold Hill Spencer Academy (formally Arnold Hill Academy) is a mixed secondary school and sixth form located in the county of Nottinghamshire in the East Midlands. It teaches children from 11 to 18 - Years 7-13. It is located in Arnold but it serves children from various nearby areas including Killisick, Daybrook, Woodthorpe, Mapperley, Carlton, Sherwood. It is split into 4 buildings ("A-Block" (previously Upper School), "B-Block" (previously Lower School), "6th Form Centre", and "Ramsey House" (previously Nurture Centre) and has around 1600 pupils and over 100 teachers.

== History ==
=== Grammar school to Comprehensive ===
The original designation was the Arnold County High School, which was opened in 1959 as a grammar school. Pupils came from about a ten-mile (16 km) radius : the county was in an extensive school building programme, to cope with the post-war baby boom.

Third year pupils from Arnold Girls Secondary School and Robert Mellors secondary School in Arnold in 1975 heralded the schools new Comprehensive status.

Initially, on the 45-acre (180,000 m^{2}) site, there was a lower school for first and second year pupils (formerly the girls secondary modern school building), the first batch of 120 third year pupils moved straight into the middle school, which consisted of 6 classrooms, six large house rooms, used for dining and house activities, and between them, three kitchens.

The first headmaster was Dr J H Higginson, who wrote a book on the establishment of the school, entitled A School Is Born, (ISBN 0-86332-199-2 - published 1987) which covered many aspects of the school. The first deputy head was W T N Thompson. Several of the younger initial teaching staff remained for many years. The school operated a house system where the 'names' were then living international identities - clockwise around the three sided middle school, these were:

- Gladys Aylward
- Ryder-Cheshire (Leonard Cheshire and Sue Ryder)
- Pandit - Anton Makarenko, Eleanor Roosevelt and Albert Schweitzer.

Pupils were encouraged to forge links with the countries represented by those houses

A new school was built in the mid-1960s on the same site. In 1974, the separate schools occupying these premises were amalgamated to form Arnold Hill Comprehensive School.

=== Lower School fire (2004) ===
In September 2004 the school was forced to close for several months when a large fire destroyed 16 of the recently refurbished classrooms in the Lower School building. The school quickly allowed sixth form students and GCSE pupils (Years 10 & 11) to return, but the reduced number of classrooms - smoke and structural damage meant that the entire Lower School building was uninhabitable, except the reception and hall area - prevented pupils from years 7, 8 & 9 from returning for several weeks. Their return was delayed and rescheduled several times because of delays in the construction of the Portakabins, but eventually they were returned to school. The large array of Portakabin buildings were known officially as "The Village".

=== Controversy surrounding "stripper" (2007) ===
On 6 November 2007, a stripper performed at the school for a student's birthday. According to The Daily Telegraph, the student's mother hired the stripper as a birthday gift for her 16-year-old son as a mistake, intending to order a man in a gorilla suit. The stripper undressed to her undergarments before being asked to stop by a faculty member. A spokeswoman has said "There was an incident, we are aware of it, and it is being dealt with."

=== Sixth Form Centre fire (2010) ===
On Wednesday April 28, 2010 at 11:30pm a fire broke out in the Sixth Form block. Fire crews spent six hours tackling the fire but the Sixth Form block was completely destroyed by the blaze. Consequently, the building was demolished. As of June 2010 a new Sixth Form building has been constructed using Portakabins. The construction of a new centre began in early 2011, which is now complete.

=== New Upper School building ===
In June 2014, Arnold Hill Academy gained funding from the EFA (Education Funding Agency) to rebuild the Upper School site which had been built in 1959. The whole of the upper school grounds were demolished and remodeled into additional sports pitches and recreational areas. The new upper school building - now referred to as A Block - was established in the place of the old Rugby pitch and consists of three floors of classrooms, an assembly hall, a sports hall, a food servery and 70 individual toilets (arranged into 5 groups of 14).

== Notable former pupils ==
- Tom Blyth, actor
- Matthew Newton, Founder & Director of Lavish Alice www.lavishalice.com
- Peter Plumb, Chief Executive (2009–16) of Moneysupermarket.com
- Rohan Samrai, of the 2015 Battle of the Bands
