= Church of the Good Shepherd, Nottingham =

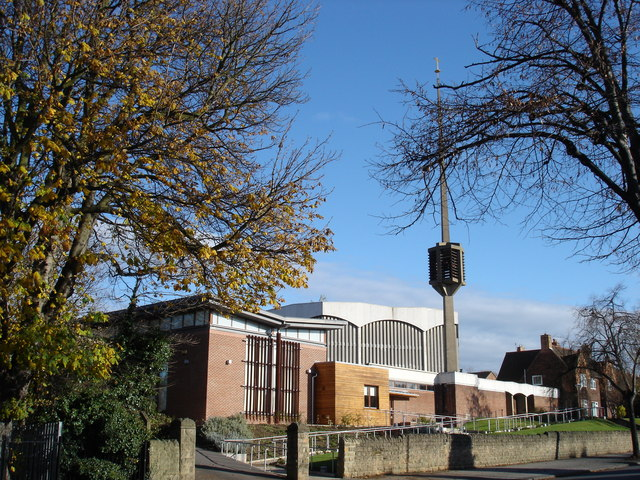
- The church in 2008
- Church of the Good Shepherd, Nottingham
- 52.992982°N 1.136463°W
- OS grid reference: SK 58058 44326
- Location: Arnold, Nottingham
- Country: England
- Denomination: Roman Catholic
- Website: Official website

History
- Status: Church

Architecture
- Functional status: Active
- Heritage designation: Grade II* listed.
- Designated: 1998
- Architect: Gerard Goalen
- Style: Art Deco
- Groundbreaking: 1963
- Completed: 1964

Specifications
- Materials: Concrete; brick; wood

Administration
- Province: Westminster
- Diocese: Nottingham
- Parish: Arnold

The Church of the Good Shepherd is a Roman Catholic church in Woodthorpe, Nottinghamshire. It is a Grade II* listed building.

== History ==
The church was opened on 23 July 1964 and it celebrated its Golden Jubilee commemorating fifty years of service in 2014. The architect was Gerard Goalen and the modern design won an award from the Royal Institute of British Architects in 1966. The dalle de verre stained glass is by Patrick Reyntiens.

The Church is on the Historic England - Heritage at Risk Register, having been assessed as condition "Poor" and "Priority: A - Immediate risk of further rapid deterioration or loss of fabric".

It had previously suffered with roof issues. In 2012, roof membrane and reinforcement works cost around £300,000 which primarily enabled the removal of damaging rainwater from the church's flat roof. The parish fundraised to cover the cost of repairs with around a third match funding allocated by English Heritage as a significant contribution towards the works.

== Organ ==
The church contains a pipe organ by J. W. Walker & Sons Ltd. A specification of the organ can be found on the National Pipe Organ Register.

== See also ==
- Grade II* listed buildings in Nottinghamshire
- Listed buildings in Gedling (unparished areas)
