= James Bodell =

English-born soldier, businessman, local politician and writer from New Zealand

James Bodell (c. 1831 – 23 September 1892) was a New Zealand soldier, businessman, local politician and writer. He was born in Arnold, Nottinghamshire, England and was Mayor of Tauranga between 1888 and 1889.

== Early life ==
The son of framework knitter William Bodell and his wife, Maria Margrom, James Bodell was baptized in Arnold – a town in the English ceremonial county of Nottinghamshire – on 3 July 1831. The family soon relocated to Leicester, a city around 30 miles (48 km) away, where Bodell attended school for three years.

=== Enlistment ===
Bodell enlisted in the 59th (2nd Nottinghamshire) Regiment of Foot in 1848, the year of a series of revolutions in Western and Central Europe.

== Later life ==
Bodell served in the militia in Waikato from 1863 to 1866. He was briefly a photographer, in the 1870s.

His memoirs, edited by Sir Keith Sinclair, were published in 1982 as A Soldier’s View of Empire.
