= Henry Anthony (cricketer) =

Player for Nottinghamshire County Cricket Club 1898–1902

Personal information
- Full name: Henry Anthony
- Born: 16 May 1873 or 20 September 1876; Old Basford or Arnold, Nottinghamshire, England
- Died: 13 July 1928 (aged 55 or 51); Mansfield, Nottinghamshire, England
- Batting: Right-handed
- Bowling: Right-arm medium

Domestic team information
- Years: Team
- 1898–1902: Nottinghamshire
- FC debut: 27 June 1898 Nottinghamshire v Kent
- Last FC: 2 June 1902 Nottinghamshire v Sussex

Career statistics
Competition	First-class
Matches	4
Runs scored	52
Batting average	8.66
100s/50s	0/0
Top score	13*
Balls bowled	173
Wickets	2
Bowling average	40.50
5 wickets in innings	0
10 wickets in match	0
Best bowling	1/15
Catches/stumpings	3/–
- Source: CricketArchive, 27 September 2008

Henry Anthony (16 May 1873 or 20 September 1876 – 13 July 1928) was an English first-class cricketer. He was a right-handed batsman and a right-arm medium-pace bowler who played for Nottinghamshire. He was born in either Old Basford or Arnold, Nottinghamshire.

Anthony made four first-class appearances between 1898 and 1902, in the Nottinghamshire lower-order. Anthony's brother, George and uncle Alfred also played first-class cricket, the brothers partnering each other in the lower order in Henry's final first-class game. Their brother Walter Anthony won a football championship medal with Blackburn Rovers in 1912.
