= Walter Anthony (footballer) =

English footballer (1879–1950)

Personal information
- Full name: Walter Anthony
- Date of birth: 21 November 1879
- Place of birth: Basford, England
- Date of death: 26 January 1950 (aged 70)
- Place of death: Basford, England
- Height: 5 ft 8 in (1.73 m)
- Position: Outside left

Senior career*
| Years | Team | Apps | (Gls) |
- Osmaston
- Heanor Town
| 189?–190? | Newstead Byron | | |
| 190?–1904 | Arnold | | |
| 1904–1905 | Nottingham Forest | 6 | (0) |
| 1905–1908 | Brighton & Hove Albion | 80 | (8) |
| 1908–1915 | Blackburn Rovers | 149 | (11) |
| 1915–19?? | Stalybridge Celtic | | |
- * Club domestic league appearances and goals

Walter Anthony (21 November 1879 – 26 January 1950) was an English professional footballer who made 155 Football League appearances playing as an outside forward for Nottingham Forest and Blackburn Rovers, with whom he won the 1911–12 Football League title and the 1912 FA Charity Shield. He also played in the Southern League for Brighton & Hove Albion.

== Life and career ==
Anthony was born in Basford, Nottinghamshire. He was the younger brother of George and Henry Anthony, who both played cricket for that county. He began his football career at local level with clubs including Osmaston, Heanor Town, Newstead Byron and Arnold before signing for Football League First Division club Nottingham Forest in February 1904 for a fee reported as £25.

He made six league appearances for Forest, but was reportedly not thought strong enough for top-class football, and moved on to Brighton & Hove Albion of the Southern League in May 1905. He worked on his physical conditioning at his new club, and became a regular at outside right in the first team with 13 goals from 119 appearances in all competitions over two and a half years. Described by club historian Tim Carder as "a tricky little ball-player, noted for the accuracy of his crosses with either foot", he attracted attention from bigger clubs. After Brighton eliminated First Division Preston North End from the 1907–08 FA Cup after two replays, Blackburn Rovers were convinced to sign Anthony and two teammates, Dick Wombwell and Joe Lumley, for "a substantial sum", widely reported as £750. The Football Association had recently imposed a rule forbidding more than £350 to be paid for any single player, and it was understood that Anthony was the primary target and Lumley and Wombwell were makeweights in the circumvention of that maximum.

Anthony soon established himself at outside left in Blackburn's first team. He made 149 league appearances, was part of the 1911–12 Football League-winning side, and played in the Charity Shield, in which Blackburn beat Southern League champions Queens Park Rangers 2–1 in aid of the Titanic Disaster Fund. He appeared only once in 1913–14 as Rovers again finished as champions. At the end of the season, the Football League gave Rovers permission to pay Anthony a lump sum in lieu of the benefit match for which he qualified after five years service. He moved on in January 1915, to Stalybridge Celtic of the Lancashire Combination.

Anthony served in the Army in the First World War, and then worked in the mines. He spent 18 years in the dispatch department of a Nottingham car parts supplier, working until two days before his death in Basford in January 1950 at the age of 70.

== Honours ==
Blackburn Rovers

- The Football League: 1911–12
- FA Charity Shield: 1912
