= Sunset Boulevard (musical) =

1993 musical by Andrew Lloyd Webber

- Original West End logo
- Music: Andrew Lloyd Webber
- Lyrics: Don Black; Christopher Hampton Additional lyrics by Amy Powers
- Book: Don Black; Christopher Hampton
- Basis: Sunset Boulevard by Charles Brackett; Billy Wilder; D. M. Marshman Jr.
- Premiere: 12 July 1993: Adelphi Theatre, London
- Productions: 1991 Sydmonton Festival; 1993 West End; 1994 Broadway; 1996 US tour 1998 US tour 2001 UK tour 2008 West End revival 2017 Broadway revival 2017 UK Tour; 2023 West End revival 2024 Broadway revival
- Awards: 1995 Tony Awards for: Best Musical; Best Score; Best Book; 2024 Laurence Olivier Award for Best Musical Revival; 2025 Tony Award for Best Revival of a Musical

Sunset Boulevard is a musical with music by Andrew Lloyd Webber, and lyrics and libretto by Don Black and Christopher Hampton, based on the 1950 film. The plot follows Norma Desmond, a faded star of the silent-screen era, living in her decaying mansion on Sunset Boulevard in 1949 Los Angeles. When young screenwriter Joe Gillis accidentally crosses her path, she sees an opportunity to make her return to the big screen, with romance and tragedy to follow.

Opening first in London in 1993, the musical has had several long runs internationally and enjoyed extensive tours. However, it has been the subject of several legal battles and ultimately lost money due to its extraordinary running costs. The 1994 Broadway production was nominated for 11 Tony Awards, winning 7, including best musical. The 2023 West End revival was nominated for 11 Olivier Awards, winning 7, including best musical revival. The 2024 Broadway revival was nominated for 7 Tony Awards and won 3, including Best Revival of a Musical.

== Background ==
From approximately 1952 to 1956, Gloria Swanson worked with actor Richard Stapley (aka Richard Wyler) and cabaret singer and pianist Dickson Hughes on a musical adaptation originally entitled Starring Norma Desmond, then Boulevard! It ended on a happier note than the film, with Norma Desmond allowing Joe Gillis to leave and pursue a happy ending with Betty Schaefer. Rights holder Paramount Pictures originally had given Swanson verbal permission to proceed with the musical, but there had been no formal legal arrangement. On 20 February 1957, Paramount executive Russell Holman wrote to Swanson asking her to cease work on the project because "it would be damaging for the property to be offered to the entertainment public in another form as a stage musical." In 1994, Hughes incorporated material from the production into Swanson on Sunset, based on his and Stapley's experiences in writing Boulevard! A recording of the entire score, which had been housed in the Gloria Swanson archives at the University of Texas at Austin, was released on CD in 2008.

In the early 1960s, Stephen Sondheim outlined a musical stage adaptation and went so far as to compose the first scene with librettist Burt Shevelove. A chance encounter with Billy Wilder at a cocktail party gave Sondheim the opportunity to introduce himself and ask the original film's co-screenwriter and director his opinion of the project (which was to star Jeanette MacDonald). "You can't write a musical about Sunset Boulevard," Wilder responded, "it has to be an opera. After all, it's about a dethroned queen." Sondheim immediately aborted his plans. A few years later, when he was invited by Hal Prince to write the score for a film remake starring Angela Lansbury as a fading musical comedian rather than a silent film star, Sondheim declined, citing his conversation with Wilder.

When Andrew Lloyd Webber saw the film in the early 1970s, he was inspired to write what he pictured as the title song for a theatrical adaptation, fragments of which he instead incorporated into Gumshoe. In 1976, after a conversation with Hal Prince, who had the theatrical rights to Sunset, Lloyd Webber wrote "an idea for the moment when Norma Desmond returns to Paramount Studios"; Lloyd Webber did no further work on the play until after 1989's Aspects of Love. At that point, Lloyd Webber "felt it was the subject [he] had to compose next", though by February 1990 he had announced plans to turn Really Useful Group private so he could "make movies rather than musicals."

In 1991, Lloyd Webber asked Amy Powers, a lawyer from New York with hardly any professional lyric-writing experience, to write the lyrics for Sunset Boulevard. Don Black was later brought in to work with Powers; the two wrote the version that was performed in 1991 at Lloyd Webber's Sydmonton Festival. This original version starred Ria Jones as Norma, Michael Ball as Joe, Frances Ruffelle as Betty, and Kevin Colson as Max. It was still in the experimental stage, however, and not ready for potential producers. A revised version, written by Black and Christopher Hampton, had a complete performance at the 1992 Sydmonton Festival, with Patti LuPone playing Norma, Kevin Anderson as Joe, Michael Bauer as Max, and Meredith Braun as Betty. This "met with great success". Lloyd Webber borrowed several of the tunes from his 1986 mini-musical Cricket, written with Tim Rice, which had been performed at Windsor Castle and later at the 1986 Sydmonton Festival.

== Synopsis ==
=== Act I ===
The place: A mansion on Sunset Boulevard, Los Angeles, 5 a.m. A homicide has been reported. Joe Gillis sets the scene ("Prologue"), noting that "an old-time movie star is involved / Maybe the biggest star of all", and that, if you want to know the "real facts", "you've come to the right party."

Flashback to... Hollywood, 1949 – where a down-on-his-luck screenwriter, Joe Gillis, is trying to hustle up some work at Paramount Studios ("Let's Have Lunch"). His appointment with a producer goes poorly when the executive rejects both Joe's proposed script and a loan to bring his car payments up to date. Joe does, however, meet Betty Schaefer, a pretty, young script editor who suggests they collaborate to rework one of his earlier screenplays ("Every Movie's a Circus"). As they chat, car repossession agents spot Joe, who quickly escapes.

During the ensuing chase, Joe evades his pursuers by pulling in to the garage of a palatial but dilapidated mansion on Sunset Boulevard. Beckoned inside the house, Joe encounters Norma Desmond ("Surrender"), a star actress of the silent-film era. Taken aback, Joe comments, "You used to be in pictures; you used to be big," to which Norma retorts, "I am big – it's the pictures that got small!" ("With One Look")

The gloomy estate is inhabited only by Norma and Max von Mayerling, her loyal butler and chauffeur. Although decades past her prime and mostly forgotten by the public, Norma is convinced she is as beautiful and popular as ever. Max perpetuates this illusion by shielding her from the realities of life out of the limelight and by writing her letters purportedly from still-devoted fans. Norma informs Joe that she plans to make her comeback with Salome, a script she has written for Cecil B. DeMille to direct with her in the starring role as the teenage biblical temptress ("Salome"). Dubious but sensing opportunity, Joe accepts her offer to work on editing the script. Norma insists that Joe stay in her home while they collaborate on Salome ("The Greatest Star of All").

Joe immediately realizes the script is incoherent, but because Norma won't allow a major rewrite, the revision drags on for months. During this time Joe is virtually imprisoned within the house, but he does break away to fulfill his commitment to Betty. Their working relationship blossoms into a romance that has her reconsidering her engagement to Joe's best friend, Artie Green ("Girl Meets Boy").

Blind to Joe's opportunism, Norma lavishes him with gifts that include a wardrobe makeover and he becomes her kept man ("The Lady's Paying"). She declares her love for him and turns quite possessive ("The Perfect Year"); when he leaves her to attend Artie's New Year's Eve party ("This Time Next Year"), she is distraught and attempts suicide. As a conciliatory gesture, Joe reluctantly returns to work on Salome.

=== Act II ===
Joe is now living in luxury at Norma Desmond's mansion, for reasons he bluntly states are mercenary ("Sunset Boulevard"). A cryptic message from Paramount has Norma certain that DeMille is eager to discuss her script ("There's Been A Call"). She drops in on the set of his current film and is greeted warmly by former colleagues and the famed director himself, but he is non-committal about Salome ("As If We Never Said Goodbye"). Meanwhile, Max discovers the studio had called to ask about Norma's Isotta Fraschini, not her screenplay. However, a delusional Norma leaves the lot convinced she'll soon be back in front of the cameras and begins to prepare for the role ("Eternal Youth Is Worth a Little Suffering").

Increasingly paranoid, Norma deduces that Joe and Betty are more than just friends ("Too Much in Love to Care"). Max tells Joe of the depth of his commitment to protecting Norma from discovering the truth, revealing that he was Norma's first husband and has stayed with her all these years ("New Ways to Dream" (reprise)). She calls Betty to reveal Joe's secret life at the mansion, but he overhears and grabs the phone to tell Betty to come see for herself. Realizing their affair is doomed, Joe brusquely tells Betty he enjoys being Norma's pet and that she should go back to Artie. Betty departs, confused and heartbroken, and Joe tells Norma he is leaving her and returning to his hometown of Dayton, Ohio. He also bluntly informs her that Salome is an unfilmable script and her fans have long abandoned her. Furious and grief-stricken, Norma fatally shoots Joe three times as he storms out of the house.

Now completely insane, Norma mistakes the swarms of police and reporters who arrive for studio personnel. Imagining herself on the set of Salome, she slowly descends her grand staircase and utters, "And now, Mr. DeMille, I am ready for my close-up." ("The Final Scene").

== Major characters ==
- Norma Desmond – a faded, eccentric, former silent screen star
- Joe Gillis – a struggling young screenwriter
- Max von Mayerling – Norma's first husband and butler
- Betty Schaefer – a budding writer and Joe's love interest
- Artie Green – Betty's fiancé
- Cecil B. DeMille – the famous director

== Casts ==
Character	West End	Los Angeles	Broadway	U.S. tour	U.K. tour	West End revival	Broadway revival	West End revival	Broadway revival
Character	1993		1994	1996	2001	2008	2017	2023	2024
Norma Desmond	Patti LuPone	Glenn Close	Glenn Close	Linda Balgord	Faith Brown	Kathryn Evans	Glenn Close	Nicole Scherzinger°	Nicole Scherzinger°
Joe Gillis	Kevin Anderson	Alan Campbell	Alan Campbell	Ron Bohmer	Earl Carpenter	Ben Goddard	Michael Xavier	Tom Francis	Tom Francis
Max von Mayerling	Daniel Benzali	George Hearn	George Hearn	Ed Dixon	Michael Bauer	Dave Willetts	Fred Johanson	David Thaxton	David Thaxton
Betty Schaefer	Meredith Braun	Judy Kuhn	Alice Ripley	Lauren Kennedy	Ceri Ann Gregory	Laura Pitt-Pulford	Siobhan Dillon	Grace Hodgett Young	Grace Hodgett Young
Artie Green	Gareth Snook	Vincent Tumeo	Vincent Tumeo	James Clow	Jeremy Finch	Tomm Coles	Preston Truman Boyd	Ahmed Hamad	Diego Andres Rodriguez
Cecil B. DeMille	Michael Bauer	Alan Oppenheimer	Alan Oppenheimer	William Chapman	Vincent Pirillo	Craig Pinder	Paul Schoeffler	Jon Tsouras	Shavey Brown

°Rachel Tucker played Norma Desmond at select performances in the 2023 West End revival, and Mandy Gonzalez played Norma at select performances in the 2024 Broadway revival.

=== Notable replacements ===
West End (1993–97)

- Norma Desmond: Betty Buckley, Elaine Paige, Petula Clark, Rita Moreno
- Joe Gillis: John Barrowman, Alexander Hanson, Graham Bickley, Glyn Kerslake
- Betty Schaefer: Anita Louise Combe

Broadway (1994–97)

- Norma Desmond: Betty Buckley, Elaine Paige
- Joe Gillis: John Barrowman
- Cecil B. DeMille: Rod Loomis

UK Tour (2001–02)

- Artie Green: Ramin Karimloo

Broadway revival (2024–25)

- Max von Mayerling: Jordan Donica
- Joe Gillis: Pierre Marais

== Musical numbers ==
Act I

- "Overture" / "Prologue" – Joe
- "Let's Have Lunch" – Joe, Artie, Sheldrake, Betty, Actors, Actress & Scriptwriters
- "Every Movie's a Circus" † – Betty, Joe, Finance Man 1 & Finance Man 2
- "Surrender" – Norma
- "With One Look" – Norma
- "Salome" – Norma & Joe
- "The Greatest Star of All" – Max
- "Every Movie's a Circus" (reprise) ∞ † – Artie, Joe, Betty, Barman, Actors, Actress & Waiters
- "Girl Meets Boy" – Joe & Betty
- "New Ways to Dream" – Norma & Joe
- "The Lady's Paying" ^ – Norma, Joe, Manfred & Men's Shop Salesmen
- "The Perfect Year" – Norma & Joe
- "This Time Next Year" – Joe, Betty, Artie & Ensemble

Act II

- "Entr'acte" – Orchestra
- "Sunset Boulevard" – Joe
- "There's Been a Call" – Norma & Joe
- "As If We Never Said Goodbye" – Norma
- "Surrender" (reprise) – Cecil B. DeMile
- "Girl Meets Boy" (reprise) – Joe & Betty
- "Eternal Youth Is Worth a Little Suffering" ^ – Norma, Astrologer & Beauticians
- "Too Much in Love to Care" – Betty & Joe
- "New Ways to Dream" (reprise) – Max
- "The Final Scene" – Joe, Betty, Norma & Max

† Added for Los Angeles production

^ Cut from the 2023 West End and 2024 Broadway productions

∞ Originally a reprise of "Let's Have Lunch"

== Productions ==
=== Original West End production ===
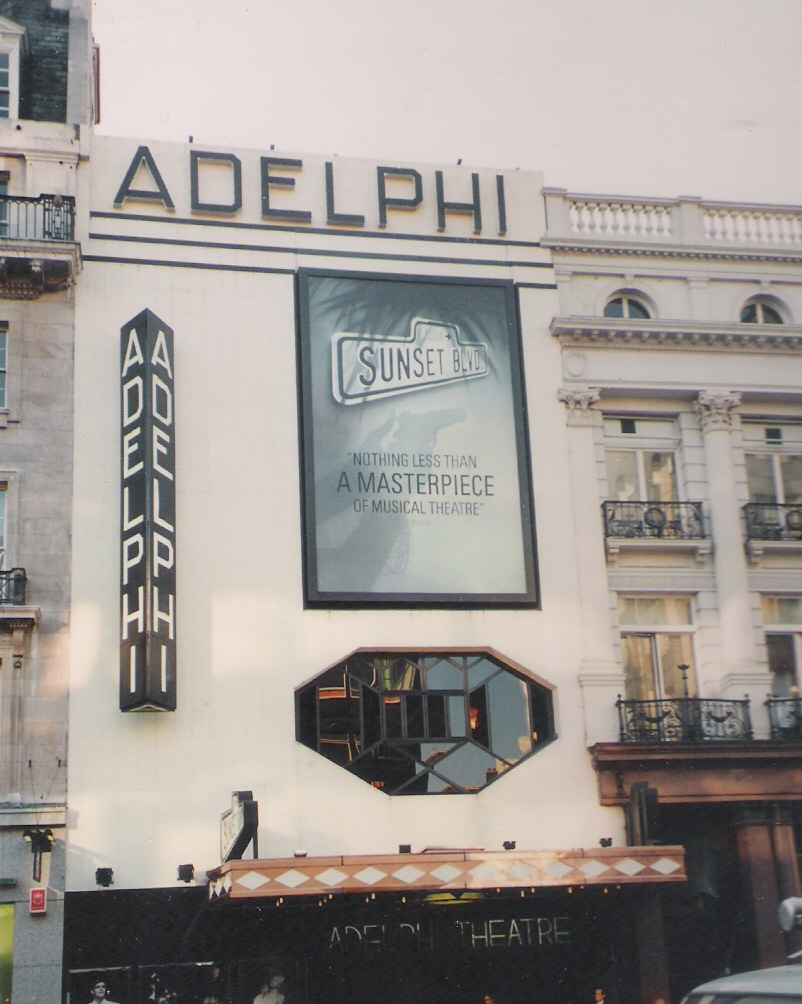
Sunset Boulevard at the Adelphi Theatre

The original West End production, directed by Trevor Nunn and choreographed by Bob Avian, with costumes by Anthony Powell, opened on 12 July 1993 at the Adelphi Theatre. The cast featured Patti LuPone as Norma Desmond, Kevin Anderson as Joe Gillis, Meredith Braun as Betty Schaefer, and Daniel Benzali as Max von Mayerling. Billy Wilder and his wife Audrey Young were joined by Nancy Olson, who had played Betty in the original film, at the opening night performance. Wilder said, "The best thing they did was leave the script alone", and praised LuPone. Reviews were mixed, according to the Associated Press (AP) review summary, quoting the AP critic, Michael Kuchwara: "Some reviewers felt Lloyd Webber took the sting out of a cynical tale. Wilder's bitter brew has been diluted. ... When LuPone is off stage, the show sags.'" Frank Rich wrote in The New York Times:

Much of the film's plot, dialogue and horror-movie mood are preserved, not to mention clips used to illustrate those sequences in which [Norma and Joe] travel by car. [Black and Hampton] smartly tailor their jokes to the original screenplay's style. ... Lloyd Webber gets into the Wilder swing ... with joltingly angry diatribes about Hollywood, part exposition-packed recitative and part song, in which the surprisingly dark, jazz-accented music, the most interesting I've yet encountered from this composer, meshes perfectly with the cynical lyrics. Anderson makes the sardonic Wilder voice an almost physical presence in Sunset Boulevard, but he is too often drowned out by both LuPone's Broadway belt and mechanical efforts of Lloyd Webber and his director, Trevor Nunn, to stamp the proven formulas of Phantom and Les Miz on even an intimate tale. ... [T]he mammoth set advances like a glacier toward the audience or retreats, or, most dramatically, rises partly up into the flies, actors in tow.

The show closed for three weeks, re-opening on 19 April 1994, revamped to follow the Los Angeles production. It had a new song, "Every Movie's a Circus", a new set, and new stars, Betty Buckley and John Barrowman. Anita Louise Combe took the role of Betty and repeated the role in the original Canadian production the following year. Michael Bauer, who had originally played DeMille, played Max until the end of the London run and then on the UK tour and in the BBC concert. Buckley and the production garnered improved reviews. Elaine Paige, who had filled in when Buckley was ill in 1994, took over the part in May 1995. Petula Clark replaced Paige in September/October 1995 and again from January 1996. The last new actress to play Norma in London was Rita Moreno. Alexander Hanson took over Joe in 1995. Graham Bickley played Joe for the final year of the run. The show closed on 5 April 1997 after 1,530 performances.

=== Los Angeles production ===
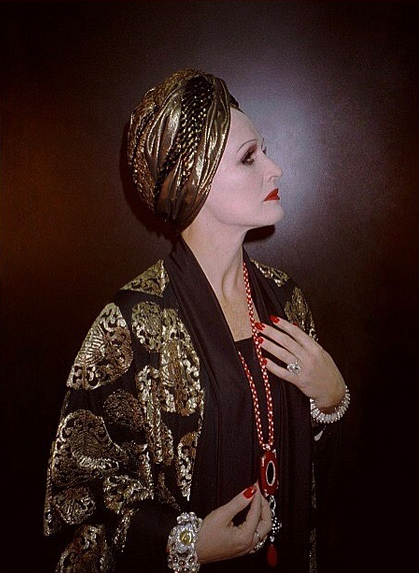
Glenn Close in costume as Norma Desmond

The first American production opened at the Shubert Theatre in Century City, Los Angeles, California, on 9 December 1993, with Glenn Close as Norma and Alan Campbell as Joe. Featured were George Hearn as Max and Judy Kuhn as Betty. Lloyd Webber had reworked both the book and score, tightening the production, better organising the orchestrations, and adding the song "Every Movie's a Circus". This new production was better received by the critics than the premiere, and was an instant success, running for 369 performances. The production also recorded a new cast album that is well regarded. It is also the only first cast recording of the show, since the original London recording was trimmed by over thirty minutes.

Faye Dunaway was hired to replace Close and began rehearsals with Rex Smith as Joe and Jon Cypher as Max. Tickets went on sale for Dunaway's engagement but shortly after rehearsals started, the producers announced that Dunaway was unable to sing the role to their standards; the production would shut down when Close left. Lloyd Webber's spokesman stated: "The cancellation came despite advance ticket sales for the Los Angeles production 'way in excess of $4 million"; Dunaway denied this. She filed a lawsuit claiming her reputation had been damaged by the producer's claims. The producers paid her a settlement.

=== Original Broadway production ===
The musical opened on Broadway at the Minskoff Theatre on 17 November 1994 with Close, Campbell, and Hearn recreating their roles from the Los Angeles production and Alice Ripley joining the cast as Betty. Also in the cast were Alan Oppenheimer as Cecil B. DeMille and Vincent Tumeo as Artie Green. The production opened with the highest ticket sale advance in Broadway history to that time. Billy Wilder, in attendance on opening night, was coaxed onstage by Close for the curtain call. In a season with only one other original musical nominated, the production won several Tony Awards, including Best Musical, Score and Book; Close, with only one other nominee as Best Actress in a musical, won the Tony for Best Performance by an Actress in a Leading Role. The New York Times critic Vincent Canby later commented about the Tony season: "Awards don't really tell you much when the competition is feeble or simply non-existent, as was the case the year that Sunset Boulevard won its Tony." During the run, Buckley replaced Close as Norma, followed by Paige. It closed on 22 March 1997, after playing 977 performances.

LuPone, who initially had been promised the Broadway run, sued Lloyd Webber and received a settlement reported to be $1 million. Frank Rich, in his book The Hot Seat, noted that these lawsuits contributed to Sunset Boulevard setting the record for the most money lost by a theatrical endeavour in the history of the United States. According to The New York Times, operating costs soared far beyond the budget, and the "Broadway production has earned back, at best, 80% of the initial $13 million". The paper reported that during the week of 2 July 1995, "it cost $731,304 to run Sunset Boulevard, including ... advertising fees of $138,352 (which had been budgeted at $40,000 a week)". The road companies also generated large financial losses. Rich puts the final figure near or above US$20 million lost, making the show what he termed a "flop-hit", as it ran more than two years, and the musical sold over a million tickets on Broadway.

=== Touring productions ===
The first national US tour in 1996 starring Linda Balgord ended in early 1997 after only a handful of venues due to exorbitant costs involved in transporting the set. Lloyd Webber called in director Susan H. Schulman to design a scaled-down production, with Petula Clark once again in the lead opposite Lewis Cleale as Joe. This production featured Anthony Powell's costumes, a slightly modified libretto by Schulman and Don Black and a new, more tour-friendly set by Derek McLane. The revised production, opening in Pittsburgh about a year after the closing of the original tour in Chicago, went on the road for almost two years, though it avoided the cities covered by the previous tour.

In August 2001, a UK tour commenced in Plymouth starring Faith Brown as Norma, opposite Earl Carpenter as Joe, and Michael Bauer reprising his West End performance as Max. The production had a completely new set, much simpler than the original London set, although the overall production remained closer to the original staging than the revamped US national tour. Carpenter left midway through the tour and was replaced by Jeremy Finch, who had previously understudied the role. The tour finished in late 2002 in Manchester and met with both excellent reviews and respectable ticket sales.

Ria Jones, who originated the role of Norma Desmond in the 1991 Sydmonton Workshop and understudied Glenn Close in the 2016 London revival, led a production opening at Leicester's Curve Theatre on 16 September 2017 for a two-week run before embarking on a UK national tour. Danny Mac was Joe. The tour, directed by Curve artistic director Nikolai Foster, transferred the musical into a Hollywood sound stage setting, designed by Colin Richmond, with acclaimed use of vintage archive film and projections designed by Douglas O'Connell.

=== West End and London revivals ===
An eight-week engagement of a minimalist production, in which the actors used musical instruments, ran at the Watermill Theatre in Newbury over the summer of 2008. Directed and choreographed by Craig Revel Horwood, the cast featured Kathryn Evans as Norma and Ben Goddard as Joe. A West End transfer of the production began on 4 December 2008 prior to an official opening on 15 December at the Comedy Theatre, with Evans and Goddard reprising their roles, and Dave Willetts joining the cast as Max. The production received rave reviews. The production closed on 30 May 2009.

Opening on 4 April 2016, English National Opera (ENO) presented a five-week 'semi-staged' production at the London Coliseum. Close reprised her role as Norma, making her London theatre debut, along with Michael Xavier as Joe, Siobhan Dillon as Betty and Fred Johanson as Max. Michael Linnit and Michael Grade for Gate Ventures PLC worked with ENO to present the show; Johnny Hon was the executive producer.

A revival opened at the Savoy Theatre in September 2023 for a 16-week limited run. Starring Nicole Scherzinger as Norma, the piece was reimagined in a modern and minimalist staging directed by Jamie Lloyd and produced by Lloyd Webber Harrison Musicals. Others in the cast were Tom Francis, David Thaxton, and Grace Hodgett Young (in her professional debut) as Joe, Max, and Betty, respectively. Rachel Tucker guest starred as Norma on 12 October 2023, and played on Monday evenings beginning 16 October. Changes to the score included cutting two songs and substantial lyric rewrites. "Let's Have Lunch" became "Let's Do Lunch", and the "Exit Music" was more substantively incorporated into the show. The revival received eleven nominations at the 2024 Laurence Olivier Awards and won seven, the most for any production of the season, including Best Musical Revival, Best Actress and Actor in a Musical for Scherzinger and Francis, and Best Director for Lloyd. A cast album, recorded live at the Savoy Theatre, Sunset Blvd: The Album, was released on 25 October 2024.

=== Broadway revivals ===
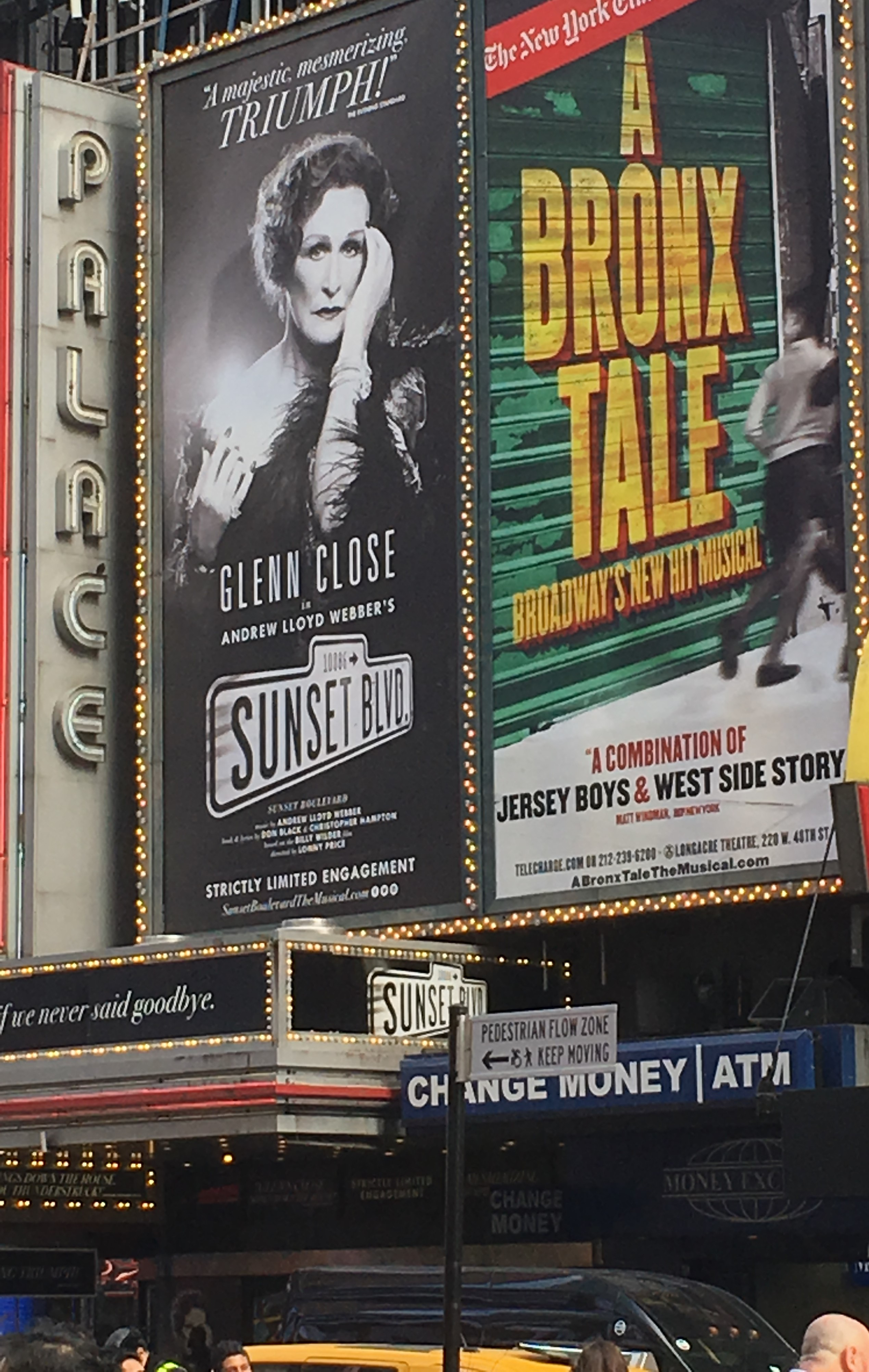
2017 revival at the Palace Theatre

Close reprised her performance as Norma in the first revival on Broadway. Featuring a 40-piece onstage orchestra and a relatively minimalist set, the production began performances at the Palace Theatre on 2 February 2017 before opening officially on 9 February for a limited run, with tickets on sale through 25 June 2017. The cast featured Xavier as Joe, Dillon as Betty, and Johanson as Max, all reprising their roles from the 2016 London ENO production. Paul Schoeffler played DeMille. The 2017 Broadway revival was directed by Lonny Price.

The 2023 West End revival transferred to Broadway for a limited run at the St. James Theatre, with previews from 28 September 2024 and an opening night on 20 October. It closed on 20 July 2025. Scherzinger reprised her role as Norma, with West End co-stars Francis as Joe, Thaxton as Max, and Young as Betty. In a six-minute sequence at the start of the second act, Joe walked through the backstage area of the theater, exited onto West 44th Street, and began to sing "Sunset Boulevard". As he sang, he strode down the street and through Shubert Alley, joined by the company before reentering the theater at the end of the song. A 25-foot (7.6 m) LCD screen inside the theater followed the sequence live. Mandy Gonzalez played Norma at select performances once a week beginning 22 October 2024. Jordan Donica took over the role of Max on 10 June 2025. The revival was nominated for seven Tony Awards, winning three for Best Revival of a Musical, Best Actress in a Musical for Scherzinger and Best Lighting Design.

=== International productions ===
The original Canadian production opened in Toronto on 15 October 1995, with Diahann Carroll in the lead role. Her performance was praised by critics. It also starred Rex Smith as Joe, Walter Charles as Max and Anita Louise Combe, who had played Betty in the London production, repeating in this role. Toronto performances ended in August 1996, with the production later moving to Vancouver where it ran from November 1996 to March 1997. A German production of the musical opened 7 December 1995 at the newly built Rhein-Main Theater in Niedernhausen near Wiesbaden, starring Helen Schneider and Sue Mathys (matinees) as Norma and Uwe Kröger as Joe. A cast recording (with Schneider and Kröger) was released in 1996. The role of Norma was later played by Daniela Ziegler and Christina Grimandi, with Schneider and, for the last few months, Sue Mathys both returning to play the lead. The production closed in May 1998.

In October 1996, the original Australian production of the musical opened at Melbourne's newly restored Regent Theatre. The cast included Debra Byrne as Norma, Hugh Jackman as Joe, and Catherine Porter as Betty. Maria Mercedes was the alternate Norma, performing two of the eight shows each week. Amanda Harrison took over the role of Betty for the final months of the show's run. The production ran until 14 June 1997.

A year-long Dutch tour commenced in the Netherlands on 10 October 2008, with Simone Kleinsma and Pia Douwes alternating as Norma and Antonie Kamerling as Joe, using the same modified libretto that was first used in the 2001 UK tour. Kleinsma went on to win the Best Actress Award for the role in the 2009 Dutch Musical Awards and also Best Actress at the Flemish Musical Prizes. An official cast album was released, with Kleinsma appearing on the main album and with a four track bonus CD of Pia Douwes singing Norma's main arias. A Swedish production took place at the Värmlandsoperan in September 2009. The role of Norma was played by Maria Lundqvist. A more elaborate production opened in October 2010, at the Gothenburg opera house, with Gunilla Backman as Norma. The first Danish production of Sunset Boulevard opened 2011 at NørregadeTeatret, Maribo, starring Karen-Lise Mynster as Norma.

A South African production starring Angela Kilian as Norma and Jonathan Roxmouth as Joe, played at the Pieter Toerien Theatre at Montecasino in Johannesburg from late August to mid-October 2013 and at Theatre on the Bay in Cape Town from late October 2013 until early January 2014.

The Czech production with Hana Fialová and Katarína Hasprová in the role of Norma had its premiere in National Moravian-Silesian Theatre in Ostrava. The premiere took place on 19 February 2015. The show closed in March 2017.

Another German production, starring Katharina Scherer as Norma, with Philippe J. Kayser as Joe, Antonia Crames as Betty, and Stephan Vanecek as Max, played from 15 September to 8 October 2017 at the Tuchfabrik in Trier.

The Spanish premiere production opened 27 December 2017 at the Auditorio de Tenerife, directed by Jaime Azpilicueta and starring Paloma San Basilio as Norma, with Gerónimo Rauch as Joe, Inma Mira as Betty, and Gonzalo Montes as Max.

Another Danish production by Den Jyske Opera opened 12 August 2022 at Musikhuset Aarhus, directed by Philipp Kochheim and starring Tammi Øst as Norma, with Randy Diamond as Joe, Katharina Maria Abt as Betty, and Martin Loft as Max. The production received mixed reviews from critics who praised the performances of Øst and the Aarhus Symphony Orchestra while criticizing the direction and the casting of Diamond as Joe due to his advanced age.

Sarah Brightman starred as Norma in a production that opened in Melbourne on 21 May 2024, at the Princess Theatre with an official opening night on 29 May. The cast also included Tim Draxl as Joe, Robert Grubb and Michael Cormick as Max, Ashleigh Rubenach as Betty, Jarrod Draper as Artie, and Paul Hanlon as Cecil B. DeMille. Silvie Paladino was the alternate Norma. This was followed by an engagement at the Sydney Opera House beginning 28 August. This was Brightman's first theatrical role in more than three decades. The production, directed by Paul Warwick Griffin with set and costume design by Morgan Large and choreography by Ashley Wallen, transferred to Singapore's Marina Bay Sands in February 2025 and toured China from March to May 2025. The tour is set to play in Tokyo from July to August 2026.

=== Other productions ===
In 2004, the first regional production of Sunset Boulevard was staged in the round at the Marriott Theatre in Chicago for a limited period and starred Paula Scrofano as Norma. It was the first and only regional production to be licensed by the Really Useful Group (RUG) for the next six years. However, in the spring of 2010, the leasing rights were finally released to regional companies and numerous productions have been staged around the United States.

The Ogunquit Playhouse production ran from 28 July through 14 August 2010 and starred Stefanie Powers as Norma and Todd Gearhart as Joe. This was the first fully staged production in the U.S. in nearly a decade. The Ogunquit production was directed by Shaun Kerrison with choreography by Tom Kosis, featured costumes by Anthony Powell and an all new set designed exclusively for Ogunquit by Todd Ivins.

The Arvada Center production ran from 14 September to 10 October 2010, in Denver, Colorado, the same city that launched the ill-fated first US tour in 1996. The show starred Ann Crumb as Norma and Kevin Earley as Joe. The production was directed by Rod A. Landsberry.

The Kennedy Center production ran from 1–8 February 2023 in Washington, D.C., with Stephanie J. Block starring as Norma, Derek Klena as Joe, Nathan Gunn as Max, and Auli'i Cravalho as Betty. Schoeffler reprised the role of DeMille. The show ran as a limited engagement as part of the Kennedy Center's Broadway Center Stage series.

=== Concert productions ===
In April 2004, Petula Clark reprised her role as Norma opposite Michael Ball as Joe in a two-night concert production at the Cork Opera House in Ireland, which was later broadcast on BBC Radio 2. The cast also included Michael Bauer (Max), Emma Williams (Betty), Michael Xavier (Artie); the BBC Concert Orchestra was conducted by Martin Yates. Another two-day concert engagement took place in 2004 at the State Theatre in Sydney; Judi Connelli starred as Norma, Michael Cormick played Joe and Anthony Warlow was Max. The Production Company staged a version of the concert for a week in Melbourne during 2005 with Connelli again as Norma and David Campbell as Joe.

A concert production of Sunset Boulevard was performed Off West End at the Alexandra Palace in June 2021. Ramin Karimloo starred as Joe, with Mazz Murray as Norma, Zizi Strallen as Betty, Jeremy Secomb as Max, and Sharif Afifi as Artie. The production transferred to the Royal Albert Hall in London, England on 3 December 2021. The concert was a fully staged production with direction by Jordan Murphy, choreography by Joanna Goodwin, and conducted by Alex Parker. Karimloo, Murray, Strallen, and Secomb reprised their performances.

== Planned film adaptation ==
Paramount Pictures and the Relevant Picture Company began developing a film adaptation of the musical by 2005. Actresses reportedly considered for the role of Norma Desmond included Close, Paige, Meryl Streep, Liza Minnelli, Barbra Streisand and Madonna. In 2013 Lloyd Webber said: [T]alks with [Paramount] have never led to anything. ... I think in many ways Sunset is ... the most complete musical I have written. ... I'm producing School of Rock on stage, and that's a Paramount picture, so maybe if they like what I do with that they'll let me do Sunset. By 2019 Rob Ashford had agreed to direct the film, with Close as Norma, Tom MacRae penning the script, and production hoped to begin later that year. Further delays followed, including from the COVID-19 pandemic. In 2021, Lloyd Webber stated: "Paramount has not wanted to go ahead with it. .... Glenn Close has been absolutely doggedly trying to get it made." In 2024, Close stated that the film is still moving forward, but Ashford is no longer directing. In 2025, Nicole Scherzinger said: "There has been some talk" that she might play Norma in the film.

== Awards and nominations ==
=== Original West End production ===
Year	Award	Category	Nominee	Result
1994	Laurence Olivier Awards	Best New Musical		Nominated
1994	Laurence Olivier Awards	Best Actress in a Musical	Patti LuPone	Nominated
1995	Laurence Olivier Awards	Best Actress in a Musical	Betty Buckley	Nominated
1996	Laurence Olivier Awards	Best Actress in a Musical	Elaine Paige	Nominated

=== Original Broadway production ===
Year	Award	Category	Nominee	Result
1995	Tony Awards	Best Musical		Won
1995	Tony Awards	Best Original Score	Andrew Lloyd Webber, Don Black and Christopher Hampton	Won
1995	Tony Awards	Best Book of a Musical	Don Black and Christopher Hampton	Won
1995	Tony Awards	Best Actor in a Musical	Alan Campbell	Nominated
1995	Tony Awards	Best Actress in a Musical	Glenn Close	Won
1995	Tony Awards	Best Featured Actor in a Musical	George Hearn	Won
1995	Tony Awards	Best Direction of a Musical	Trevor Nunn	Nominated
1995	Tony Awards	Best Choreography	Bob Avian	Nominated
1995	Tony Awards	Best Scenic Design	John Napier	Won
1995	Tony Awards	Best Costume Design	Anthony Powell	Nominated
1995	Tony Awards	Best Lighting Design	Andrew Bridge	Won
1995	Drama Desk Awards	Outstanding Actress in a Musical	Glenn Close	Won

=== 2008 West End revival ===
Year	Award	Category	Nominee	Result
2009	Laurence Olivier Awards	Best Actress in a Musical	Kathryn Evans	Nominated
2009	Laurence Olivier Awards	Best Performance in a Supporting Role in a Musical	Dave Willetts	Nominated

=== 2016 London revival ===
Year	Award	Category	Nominee	Result
2016	Evening Standard Theatre Awards	Best Musical		Nominated
2016	Evening Standard Theatre Awards	Best Musical Performance	Glenn Close	Won
2017	Laurence Olivier Awards	Best Musical Revival		Nominated
2017	Laurence Olivier Awards	Best Actress in a Musical	Glenn Close	Nominated

=== 2017 Broadway revival ===
Year	Award	Category	Nominee	Result
2017	Drama Desk Awards	Best Lighting Design	Mark Henderson	Nominated
2017	Drama League Awards	Outstanding Revival of a Broadway or Off-Broadway Musical		Nominated
2017	Outer Critics Circle Awards	Outstanding Revival of a Musical		Nominated

=== 2023 West End revival ===
Year	Award	Category	Nominee	Result
2023	Evening Standard Theatre Awards	Best Musical Performance	Nicole Scherzinger	Won
2023	Evening Standard Theatre Awards	Best Director	Jamie Lloyd	Won
2024	Laurence Olivier Awards	Best Musical Revival		Won
2024	Laurence Olivier Awards	Best Actress in a Musical	Nicole Scherzinger	Won
2024	Laurence Olivier Awards	Best Actor in a Musical	Tom Francis	Won
2024	Laurence Olivier Awards	Best Actress in a Supporting Role in a Musical	Grace Hodgett Young	Nominated
2024	Laurence Olivier Awards	Best Actor in a Supporting Role in a Musical	David Thaxton	Nominated
2024	Laurence Olivier Awards	Best Director	Jamie Lloyd	Won
2024	Laurence Olivier Awards	Best Theatre Choreographer	Fabian Aloise	Nominated
2024	Laurence Olivier Awards	Best Set Design	Soutra Gilmour (Set Design), Nathan Amzi & Joe Ransom (Video Design)	Nominated
2024	Laurence Olivier Awards	Best Lighting Design	Jack Knowles	Won
2024	Laurence Olivier Awards	Best Sound Design	Adam Fisher	Won
2024	Laurence Olivier Awards	Outstanding Musical Contribution	Alan Williams (Musical Supervision & Musical Direction)	Won

=== 2024 Broadway revival ===
Year	Award	Category	Nominee	Result
2025	Tony Award	Best Revival of a Musical		Won
2025	Tony Award	Best Actor in a Musical	Tom Francis	Nominated
2025	Tony Award	Best Actress in a Musical	Nicole Scherzinger	Won
2025	Tony Award	Best Sound Design of a Musical	Adam Fisher	Nominated
2025	Tony Award	Best Lighting Design of a Musical	Jack Knowles	Won
2025	Tony Award	Best Direction of a Musical	Jamie Lloyd	Nominated
2025	Tony Award	Best Orchestrations	David Cullen and Andrew Lloyd Webber	Nominated
2025	Drama Desk Award	Outstanding Revival of a Musical		Nominated
2025	Drama Desk Award	Outstanding Lead Performance in a Musical	Tom Francis	Nominated
2025	Drama Desk Award	Outstanding Lead Performance in a Musical	Nicole Scherzinger	Nominated
2025	Drama Desk Award	Outstanding Director of a Musical	Jamie Lloyd	Nominated
2025	Drama Desk Award	Outstanding Lighting Design for a Musical	Jack Knowles	Won
2025	Drama Desk Award	Outstanding Sound Design in a Musical	Adam Fisher	Nominated
2025	Drama Desk Award	Outstanding Projection Design	Nathan Amzi and Joe Ransom	Nominated
2025	Drama League Award	Outstanding Revival of a Musical		Won
2025	Drama League Award	Outstanding Direction of a Musical	Jamie Lloyd	Nominated
2025	Drama League Award	Distinguished Performance	Tom Francis	Nominated
2025	Drama League Award	Distinguished Performance	Nicole Scherzinger	Won
2025	Outer Critics Circle Award	Outstanding Revival of a Musical		Nominated
2025	Outer Critics Circle Award	Outstanding Lead Performer in a Broadway Musical	Nicole Scherzinger	Nominated
2025	Outer Critics Circle Award	Outstanding Sound Design of a Musical	Adam Fisher	Nominated
2025	Outer Critics Circle Award	Outstanding Projection Design	Nathan Amzi and Joe Ransom	Nominated
2025	Theatre World Award	Outstanding Broadway or Off-Broadway Debut Performance	Nicole Scherzinger	Honored
