= Arnold, Nottinghamshire =

Market town in Nottinghamshire, England

Coordinates: 53.005°N 1.127°W

Arnold
- Market town and suburb
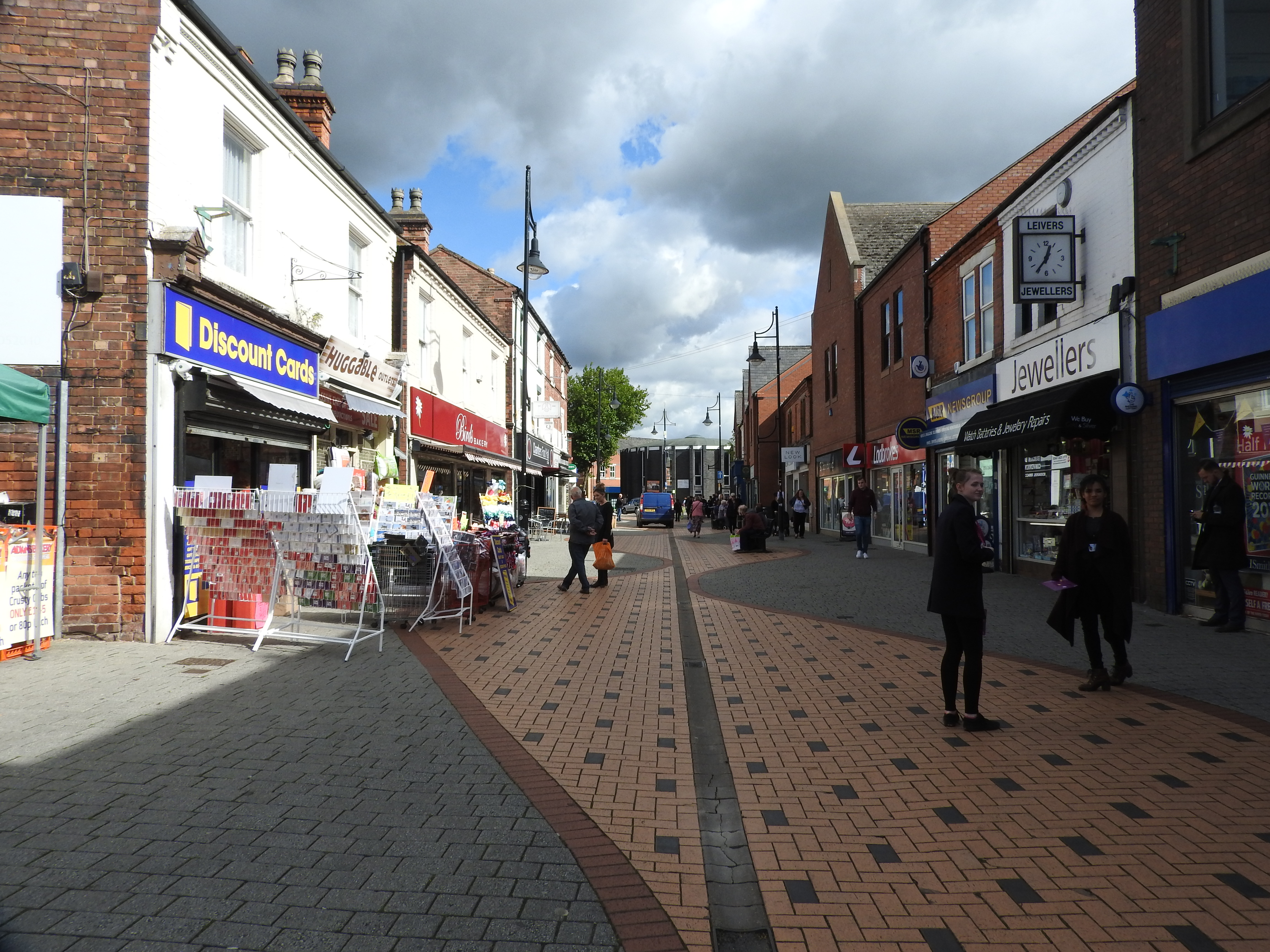
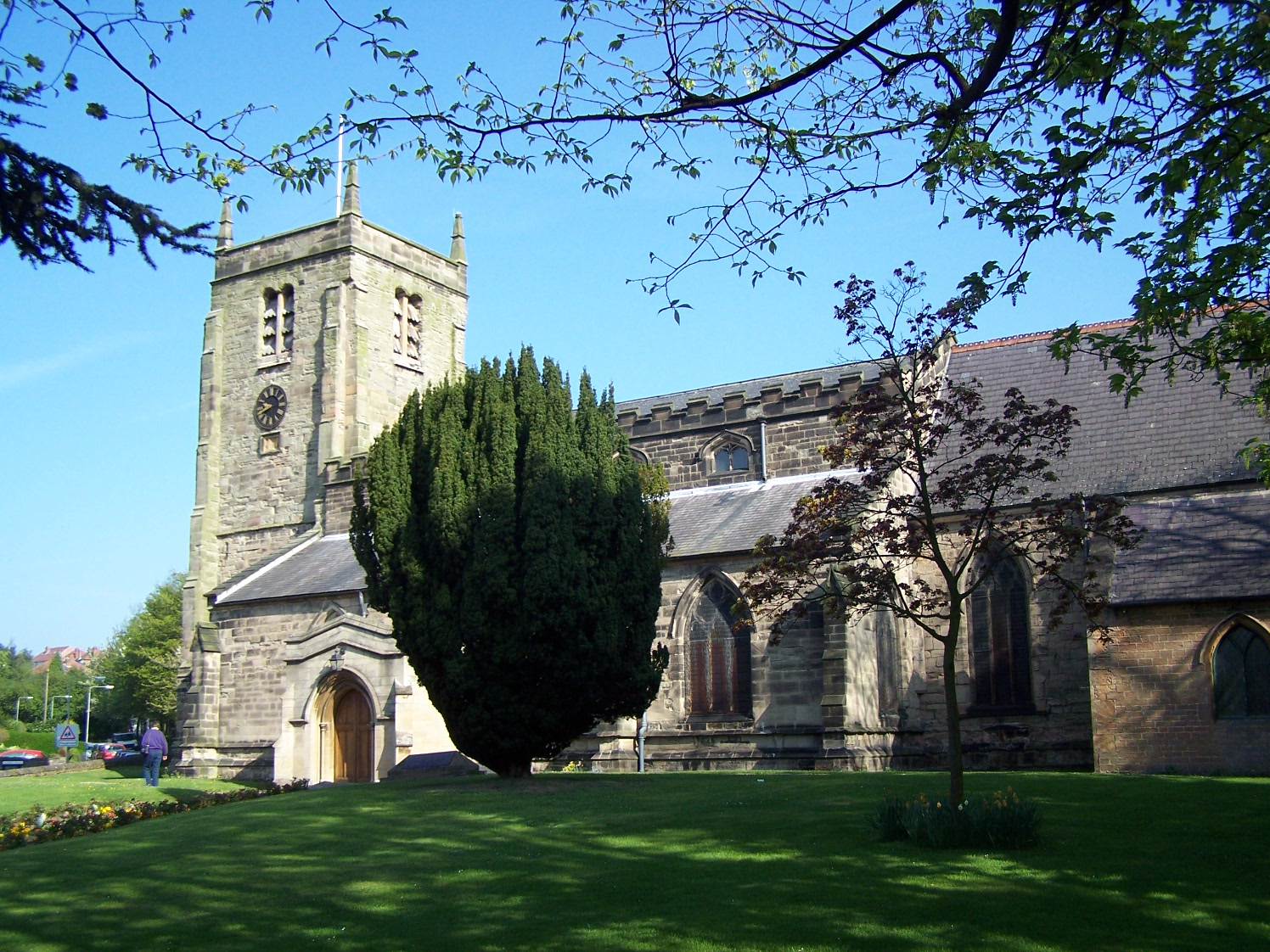
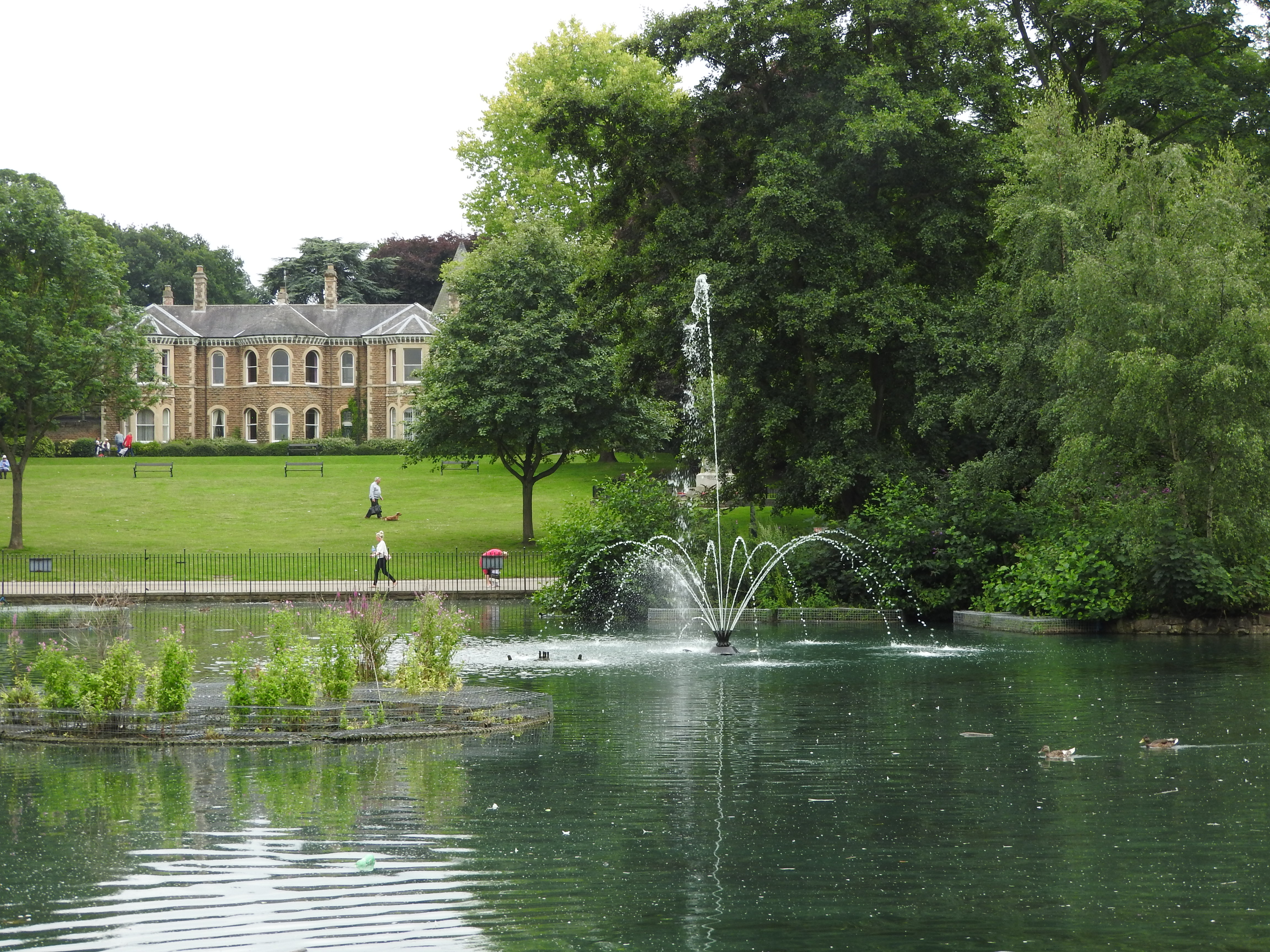
- Town centre St Mary's Church Arnot Hill Park

- Location within Nottinghamshire
- Population: 40,010 (2021 census)
- OS grid reference: SK 58574 45688
  - London: 112.5 mi (181.1 km)
- Civil parish: St.Albans (partially)
- District: Borough of Gedling
- Shire county: Nottinghamshire
- Region: East Midlands
- Country: England
- Sovereign state: United Kingdom
- Post town: Nottingham
- Postcode district: NG5
- Dialling code: 0115
- Police: Nottinghamshire
- Fire: Nottinghamshire
- Ambulance: East Midlands
- UK Parliament: Gedling
- Website: https://www.gedling.gov.uk/

Arnold (/ˈɑːr.nəld/) is a market town in the Borough of Gedling in Nottinghamshire, England. It is situated to the north-east of Nottingham's city boundary. Arnold is located in the northeastern part of the conurbation of Greater Nottingham. Gedling Borough Council is headquartered in Arnold. Since 1968 Arnold has had a market, and the town used to have numerous factories associated with the hosiery industry. Nottinghamshire Police have been headquartered in Arnold since 1979. At the time of the 2021 census, the Arnold built-up area had a population of 40,010.

Areas within Arnold include Daybrook, Woodthorpe, Redhill, Warren Hill, Killisick and Dorket Head.

== Toponymy ==
Arnold was referred to as "Ernehale" in Domesday Book of 1086. This name meant 'place frequented by eagles' or 'the valley of eagles'.

A History of Arnold (1913) by Rev. Rupert W. King and Rev. James Russell explains the toponymy of Arnold's name thus:

"Heron-hald", meaning the corner of the forest where Herons (large birds) live. Which becomes over the centuries since 500 A.D. by "lazy" pronunciation, Eron-ald, thence Ern-old and Arn-old.

The local topography suggests that Arnold can never have been a haunt of eagles, because they inhabit areas of rocky outcrops, which have formed cliffs: the nearest such location is Creswell Crags, some 20 miles (32 km) north-west as the eagle flies. However, the fish-eating white-tailed eagle (also known as the erne) could have caught fish in the River Trent, which lies 4 miles (6.4 km) south-east of Arnold, on the other side of the Mapperley Plains ridge: these eagles might then have flown north-west in the evenings to roost in the ancient woodland area now known as Arnold. The Anglo-Saxon migrant-invaders, when they arrived along the River Trent from the Humber Estuary c. 500 A.D., might have seen these eagles—which measure 66–94 cm (26–37 in) in length with a 1.78–2.45 m (5.8–8.0 ft) wingspan—flying northwest in the evenings and named this roosting location 'Erne-Halh' or 'Erne-Haugh', meaning 'eagle's nook' or 'eagle's corner'.

Arnold is surrounded by a circular ridge from the north-west around to the south-east and raised ground to the west. The town's bowl-like topography may have given it the toponymic feature '-halh' or '-haugh'.

== History ==
=== Home Brewery ===
Founded in 1875 by John Robinson, the Home Brewery (Note: The brewery was commonly known as 'Home Ales'.) was famous for its trademark Robin Hood logo on beermats. The name of the brewery referred to the Robinson family's Bestwood Home Farm, located on Oxclose Lane.

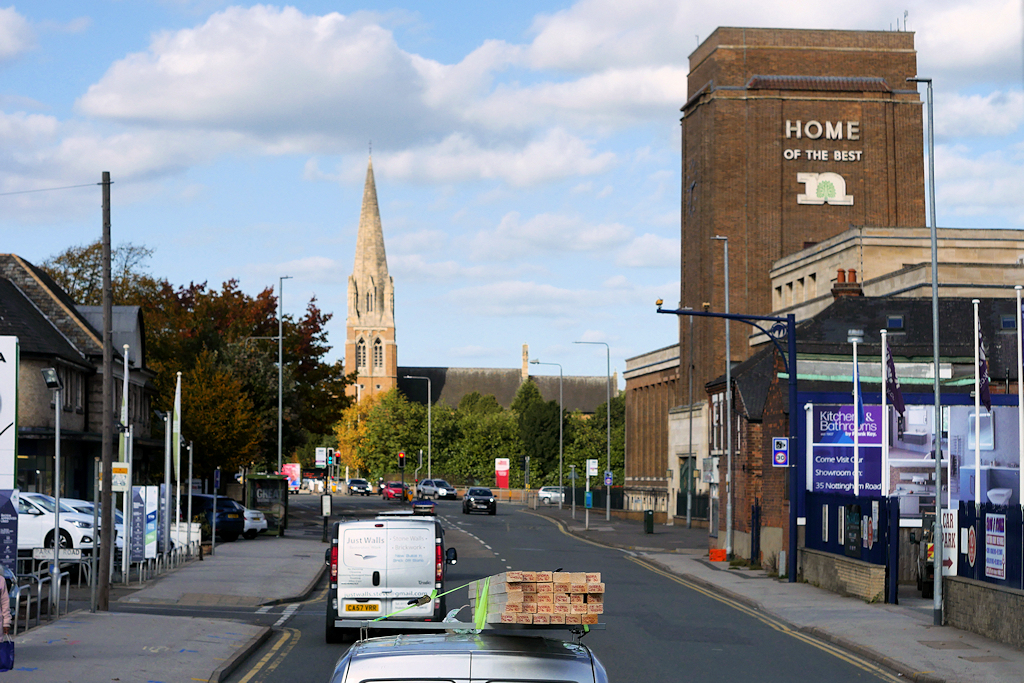
The Home Brewery office building, Daybrook

29 August 1890 saw the incorporation at Companies House of the Home Brewery Company Limited. The company was re-registered as a public limited company named Home Brewery plc on 2 April 1982. The brewery remained independent until 1986, when the family owners sold it (along with 450 pubs the brewery owned in Nottinghamshire) to Scottish & Newcastle for £123 million (equivalent to £376 million in 2024). Scottish & Newcastle gradually ran down production by subcontracting its brewing to Mansfield Brewery, resulting in the eventual closure of the Daybrook building in 1996. The closure of the brewery resulted in the loss of around 400 jobs and around £20 million to the local economy (equivalent to £37.6 million in 2024). On 7 April 2014 the company returned to its original legal status as a private company upon its incorporation as Home Brewery Limited. The company is currently still under the ownership of Heineken UK, with an active but non-trading status at Companies House.

==== Building ====
The town's most notable landmark is probably the Home Brewery office building in Daybrook. Dating from 1936, the current building is now officially known as 'Sir John Robinson House', houses more than 30,000 square feet (2,800 square metres) of Nottinghamshire County Council offices and has a total floor area of 41,032 sq ft (3,812.0 m^{2}). The entire site, including its 180-space car park, covers 1.89 acres (0.76 hectares) and is located at the junction between the A60 (Mansfield Road) and Sir John Robinson Way. (Note: Sir John Robinson Way is a road built after the redevelopment of the brewery site following its 1996 closure and named in honour of its founder.) The three-storey, (Note: excluding the "very tall square tower", which provides a fourth storey, and including the "ancillary lower ground floor") gade II listed building's architect was Thomas Cecil Howitt and the illuminated 'Home of the Best Ales' sign on the tower was altered to replace the word 'Ales' with the 'n' logo of the county council. An unusual frieze by sculptor Charles Doman along the front wall depicts groups of putti involved in the brewing of beer. Three designs are repeated in an ABCABC/CBACBA pattern. The reliefs are in a 2:3 proportion and are white casts. 'A' depicts a drinking table; 'B' shows barrel-making; and 'C' illustrates the stirring of the brew—all allegories of the brewing process. The famed decorative ironwork gates and railings are contemporaneous and form part of the historic listing.

==== King George V Park ====
In 1950, the Home Brewery Company Ltd. gave the land for Arnold's King George V Park, a permanent memorial to King George V and guaranteed for free public access in perpetuity for recreation. The green space is legally protected with the Fields in Trust charity. The Charity Commission held an enquiry that closed in December 2005 into restricted public access. Due to this ruling, Arnold Town F.C. of the Nottinghamshire Senior League Premier Division relocated away from the town centre to another ground in Arnold, known as Eagle Valley. In July 2014, a skatepark costing £110,000 was opened at the playing field.

==== The Home Ales and Home Brewery brands today ====
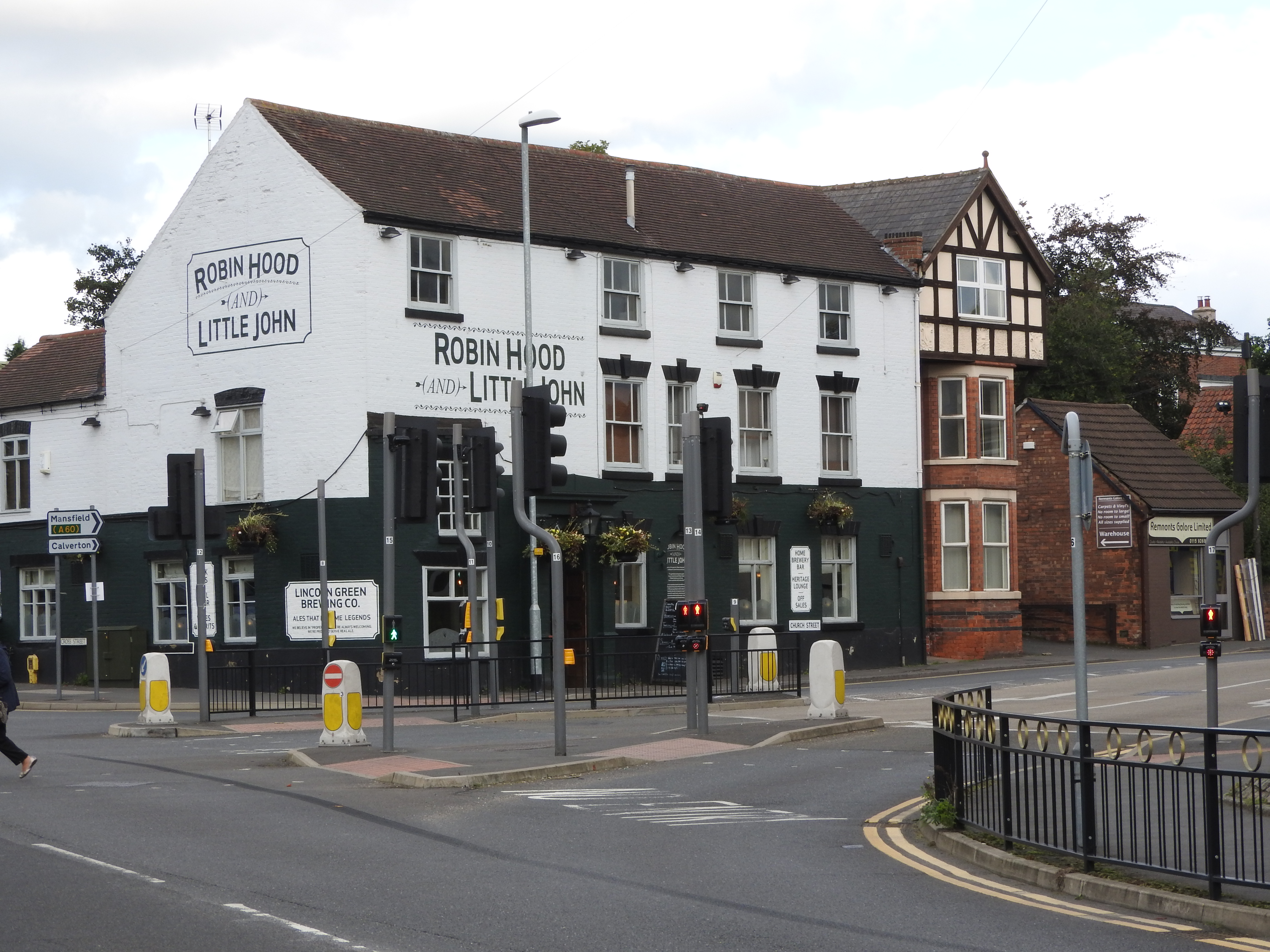
The 'Robin Hood and Little John' pub

Lincoln Green Brewery of Hucknall, in association with Everards Brewery of Leicester, purchased the Robin Hood pub on the junction of Church Street and Cross Street in 2014, restoring it to its original name of the "Robin Hood and Little John". The pub's history dates back to 1750, and in 2015 it was named as the Campaign for Real Ale (CAMRA) National Cider Pub of the Year, as well as the Nottingham CAMRA Cider Pub of the Year and Nottingham CAMRA Pub of the Year. It contains a shrine to the Home Brewery.

=== Framework knitting industry ===
Arnold was a centre of the framework knitting industry in the 19th century. It was the site of the first framebreaking incidents of the Luddite riots, on 11 March 1811, when 63 frames were smashed. The Luddite riots were a response by workers to decreasing pay, standard of living and conditions of employment in the industry as a result of changing fashions decreasing demand for their style of hosiery.

=== Arnot Hill Park ===
Arnot Hill Park was created in c. 1792 to serve as a backdrop to Arnot Hill House.

==== Arnot Hill House ====
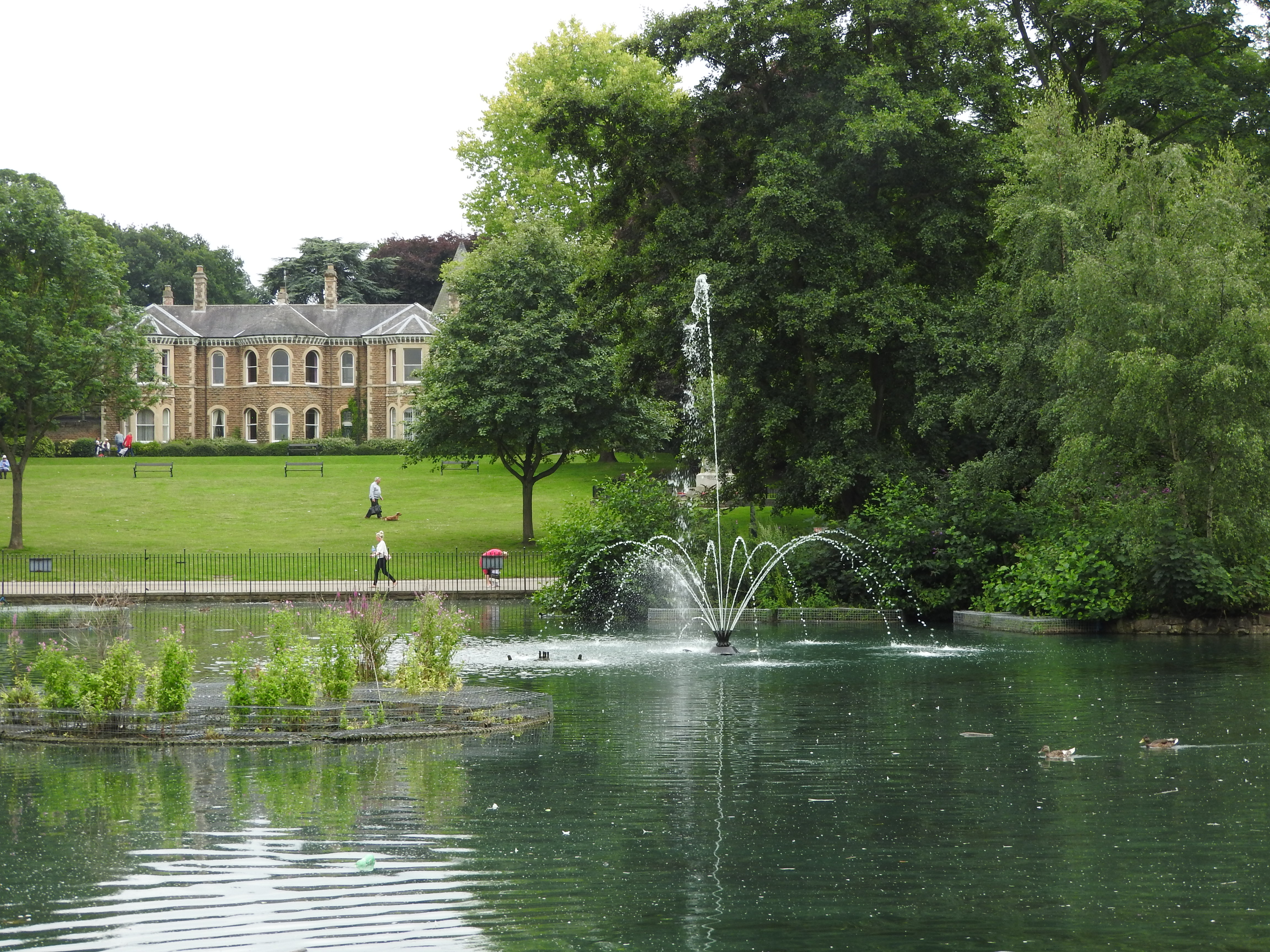
Arnot Hill House and grounds

Arnot Hill House in Daybrook was the home of the Hawksleys, a prominent Nottingham family. John Hawksley (1765-1815), a mill owner, lived there with his partner Sarah Thompson, who was the mother of his six children, four of whom survived. He had married Sarah Arnold, a doctor's daughter, on 23 February 1799 at St Margaret's Church in Leicester, but the marriage failed and she returned to Leicester where she remained until her death in 1846.

John Hawksley's relationship with Sarah Thompson is clearly demonstrated in his will dated 5 June 1812 when he writes. "I revoke all former wills and this is my last. I give and devise all my property of whatever nature or form the same may be to Mrs Beech and Sarah Thompson whom I appoint joint Executrixes of this my will for the benefit of my children John, Thomas, Francis, Maria, Frances, issue that are and any that may thereafter be born also of the body of Sarah Thompson (who assumes my name from the affection I bear her)". The will was proved on 2 April 1816 by the oaths of Sarah Beech widow (John Hawksley's sister) and Sarah Thompson spinster.

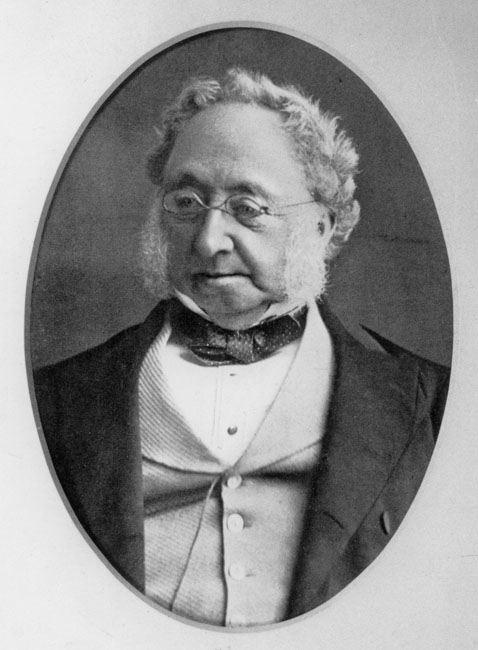
Photograph of Thomas Hawksley

John Hawksley and his business partner, the former hosier Robert Davison, had been operating a worsted mill they had built in 1788 on the north bank of the River Leen in Nottingham. After this mill had been destroyed by fire in January 1791, the two men decided to erect a new mill adjacent to Arnot Hill House. The new factory was operational before the end of 1791, but – despite its large scale and 60 horsepower (45,000 W) engine – was not a success. Davison's death in 1807, followed by extensive losses in 1809, led to the closure and subsequent demolition of the mill. On 5 February 1810 in Nottingham, John Hawksley laid the foundations of another mill, whose engine had a power of 20 horsepower (15,000 W), and he relocated with his family to Sneinton that year. He died on 27 January 1815 in Cheshunt in Hertfordshire and he appears on the family plaque in St Nicholas Church on Maid Marian Way, Nottingham.

One of John Hawksley and Sarah Thompson's children was Thomas Hawksley, born 12 July 1807, who attended Nottingham High School and was articled in 1822 by the architect and surveyor Edward Staveley, going on to become a partner in Staveley's business. Thomas Hawksley eventually became a prominent civil engineer in the 19th century. Thomas Hawksley and his son Charles Hawksley, grandson Kenneth Phipson Hawksley, and great-grandson, Thomas Edwin Hawksley (died 1972) were civil engineers specialising in public water supplies. In the early 1830s, Thomas Hawksley used a filtration system and other improvements to the water supply to greatly reduce the death rate from cholera in Nottingham.

There is a common misconception that John Hawksley the manufacturer married Mary Whittle. This is a mistake; there is a marriage between a John Hawksley and Mary Whittle on 25 October 1803 but he was a barber/hairdresser. It was in 1803 that Sarah Thompson gave birth to Maria Hawksley on 19 March. John the manufacturer died in 1815 and John the barber was still alive living with Mary a fact recorded in the 1841 and 1851 censuses. The mistake is rooted in an erroneous family tree produced in 1896 by Ida Hawksley, the wife of Charles Hawksley. The details of Ida's tree were made available by a living descendant of the Hawksley family and the corrections detailed above, including the differences in generation, are based on parish records, John Hawksley's will and the Hawksley family plaque in St Nicholas' Church in Nottingham.

This confusion regarding the two men named John Hawksley living in Nottingham is added to by the birth of sons to both men, in the same year, 1807. John Hawksley, the hairdresser, had a son named Edward John Hawskley (1808-1875). The son was a Unitarian who converted to Roman Catholicism and later rose to acclaim as a political radical in New South Wales, Australia. After fighting in Spain with the British Auxiliary Legion in the Carlist Wars, Edward John Hawksley was encouraged to emigrate to New South Wales. Once there he was employed as a teacher, became warden of the Sydney Holy Catholic Guild (1848), and wrote religious pamphlets. He edited and published The Sydney Chronicle (1846-7) and the short-lived Daily News with Charles St Julian before working with Francis Cunninghame as editor of The People's Advocate and New South Wales Vindicator. From 1863 to 1870 Hawksley was employed at the Australian Government Printing Office before retiring to Fiji, where he died in 1875.

==== Civic Centre ====
The headquarters of Gedling Borough Council are located in the Civic Centre at Arnot Hill Park.

=== Railway ===
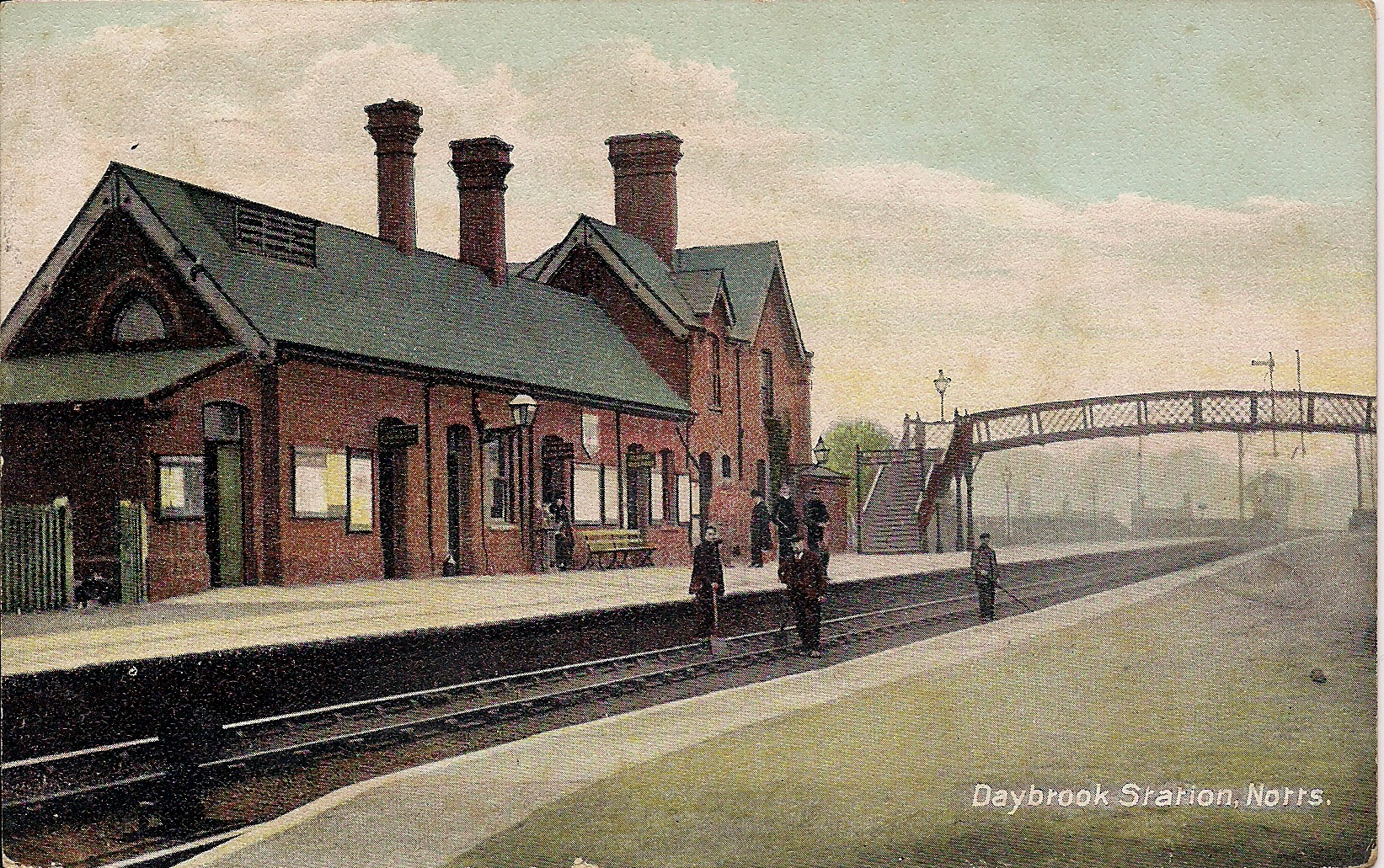
Postcard of Daybrook railway station, 1908

Arnold was served by a railway station known as 'Daybrook and Arnold' or simply 'Daybrook'. The station was an important junction on the Nottingham Suburban Railway, Leen Valley Line and Friar Gate Line. It was closed along with the rest of the lines between 1916 and 1964. The station was located on Mansfield Road (A60) on what is now a retail park. There is still evidence of the line in the form of remnants of the embankments on Arnot Hill Park (just behind GO Outdoors). In Peggy's Park (next to Edwards Lane Community Centre), decorative markings commemorate the existence of the line by showing the place where it ran.

The nearest active railway station to Arnold is now in Bulwell. With the nearest tram stop being in Basford.

The line was the Great Northern Main Line (later nicknamed 'the back route'), with trains to Gedling and Netherfield with the terminus being Nottingham Victoria. Just after those embankments a later built railway—the Nottingham Suburban Railway—joined it and ran over Thackerays Lane on a bridge on its way to Woodthorpe Park and beyond.

== Churches ==
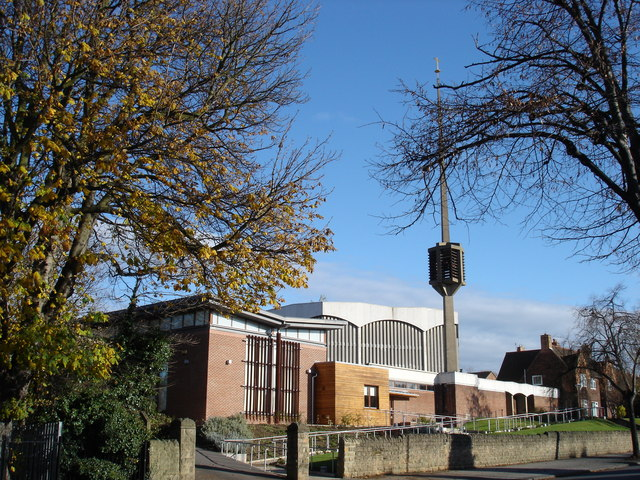
The Roman Catholic Church of the Good Shepherd, Thackerays Lane

St Mary's Church, of the Church of England, is believed to date from 1176. It is located on Church Lane and is a grade II* listed building.

The grade II* listed Roman Catholic Church of the Good Shepherd's current building on Thackerays Lane was built in 1964, its modern architecture – featuring a detached spire-cum-belfry – winning an award from the Royal Institute of British Architects in 1966.

The King's Church, formed in 1987 as Kingswell Christian Fellowship by attendants of Cornerstone Church, meets at The King's Centre, which is located on Shirley Drive. Originally, the congregation met in a local school and then a day centre for adults with learning disabilities. The church changed its name to The King's Church in 1996. The church purchased, refurbished and extended the former St. Gilbert's Catholic Church building, and the King's Church moved into The King's Centre in 2002.

Designed by Nottingham-based architect William Herbert Higginbottom, Cross Street Baptist Church was opened in 1909, replacing a previous building – dating from 1825 – on the same site. It is situated on Cross Street, hence its name.

St Mark's Church in Woodthorpe belongs to the Church of England and consists of around 8,500 parishioners. It was built in 1961 and consecrated in June 1962. It is located on De Vere Gardens.

Arnoldarmy is a Salvation Army corps based on High Street, which runs a second-hand shop called Sally's on Front Street.

Eagle's Nest Church meets on Sundays and is located in Redhill Academy on Redhill Road.

Arnold's Kingdom Hall of Jehovah's Witnesses is located on Furlong Street.

Arnold Methodist Church – 'amc' – is situated on Front Street. It is publicly accessible from where Front Street meets the Market Place, and also from the corner of Front Street and Worrall Avenue.

Emmanuel Pentecostal Church is located on Furlong Avenue.

Arnold United Reformed Church is situated on Calverton Road.

Arnold Wesleyan Reform Church is located on Burford Street.

The Church of St Paul and St Timothy in Daybrook was designed 1892–1896 by John Loughborough Pearson and its construction started in May 1893. In December 1895 the church was completed—except for the 150 feet (46 m)-tall spire and tower, which were added in 1897. The church was originally consecrated in February 1896 in honour of Paul the Apostle, but in 1993 it was re-dedicated as St. Paul's and St. Timothy's when the latter, a daughter church, was opened in Byron Street to replace Cecil Hall (which had long been used as an annexe of St Paul's). The Church of St. Paul and St. Timothy is now a grade II* listed building and is located on Mansfield Road.

Daybrook Baptist Church is situated on Mansfield Road. Its current building, completed in 1912, was designed by William Herbert Higginbottom.

== Arnold Market ==
1968 saw the opening of Arnold Market in the town centre. Market days are on Tuesdays, Fridays and Saturdays, with a flea market being held on Wednesdays. A farmers' market is held on the first Tuesday of each month. It was a private market managed by Janet Surgey (whose deputy was Nigel Wilford) until July 2018, when Gedling Borough Council purchased it from Thurland Estates Ltd.

== Recreation ==
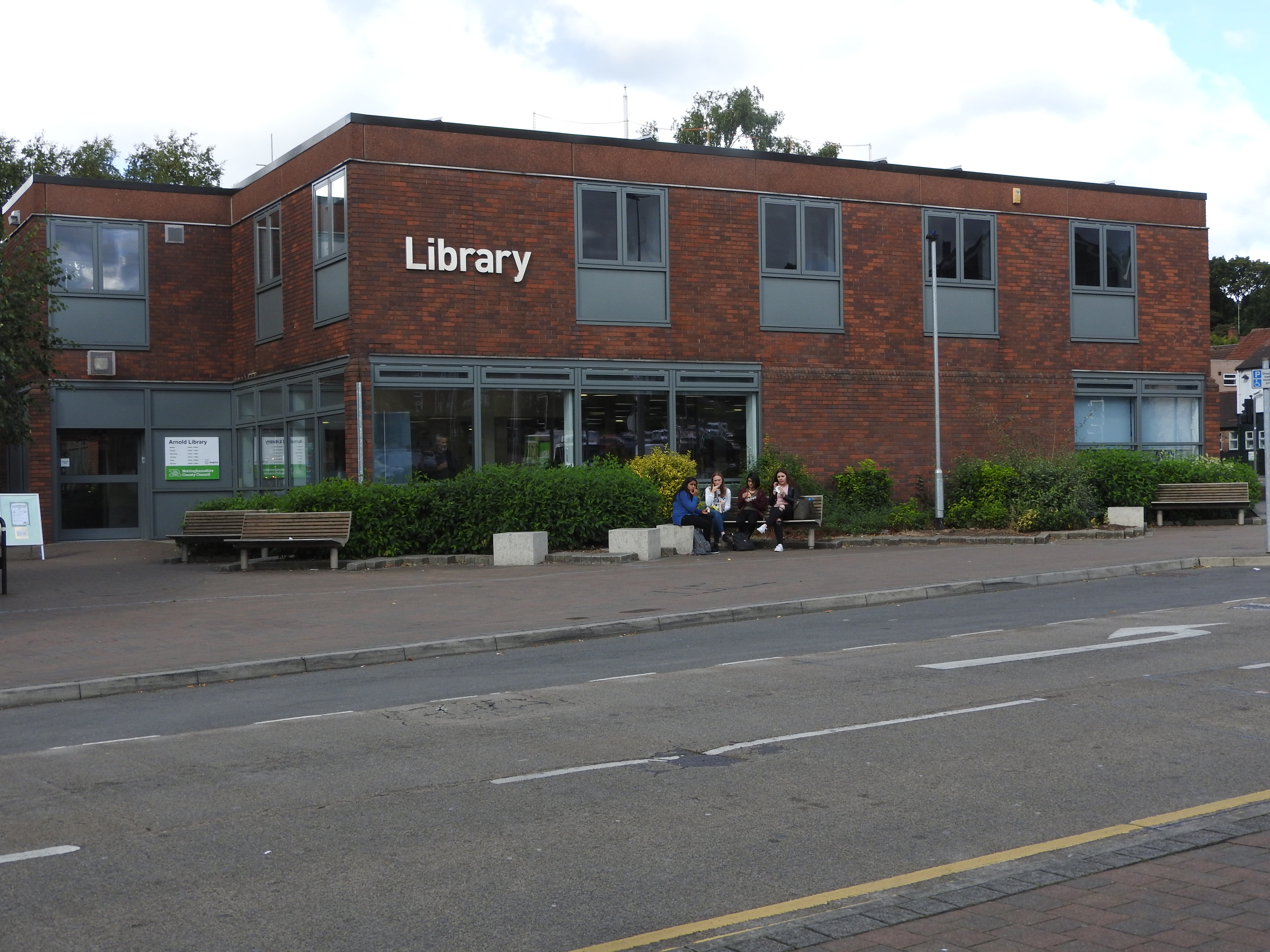
Arnold Library

Arnold Leisure Centre, located on High Street at the heart of the town centre, contains a swimming pool and a theatre—called the Bonington Theatre—which was named after the landscape painter Richard Parkes Bonington. The leisure centre was refurbished in 2014 at a cost of £1.2 million and changes include the installation of a canopy outside the main entrance, improvements to the Bonington Theatre and bar area as well as major redesigns of the reception area and the changing rooms of the swimming pool.

Connected to Arnold Leisure Centre is Arnold Library, which was refurbished in 2015 at a cost of £300,000. The refurbishments improved the library through: the addition of solar panels; the installation of LED lighting; the replacement of windows, heating and ventilation; new shelving; and enhancements to the children's library.

== Healthcare ==
Stenhouse Medical Centre is located on Furlong Street. The practice's first doctor was Dr Daniel Stenhouse, who in 1886 became a general practitioner in Arnold and practised until 1897 from Ebenezer House, which was the old farmhouse at the bottom of Worrall Avenue. Following this, Dr Stenhouse moved to live and practise from Arnold House on Church Street until his death in 1916. Before Drs Graham, Jacobs and Lobb formed a partnership due to the expansion of the practice in the 1950s, there had been a succession of independent GPs. The practice remained at Arnold House until 1970, when it moved into Arnold Health Centre. In April 1991 the practice moved into its current building on Furlong Street, on the site of what was called 'The Flying Horse Yard'. (Note: The Flying Horse Yard was named after a nearby pub, 'The Flying Horse'. Established in or before 1832, the pub was originally called the Friendly Tavern. The Flying Horse, which was Nottingham Campaign for Real Ale (CAMRA) 2012 LocAle Pub of the Year, closed in April 2015. The pub and the neighbouring Pegasus Snooker building were converted to a steakhouse called 'Sprinters'.) The practice now has six partners and 12,000 patients.

== Education ==
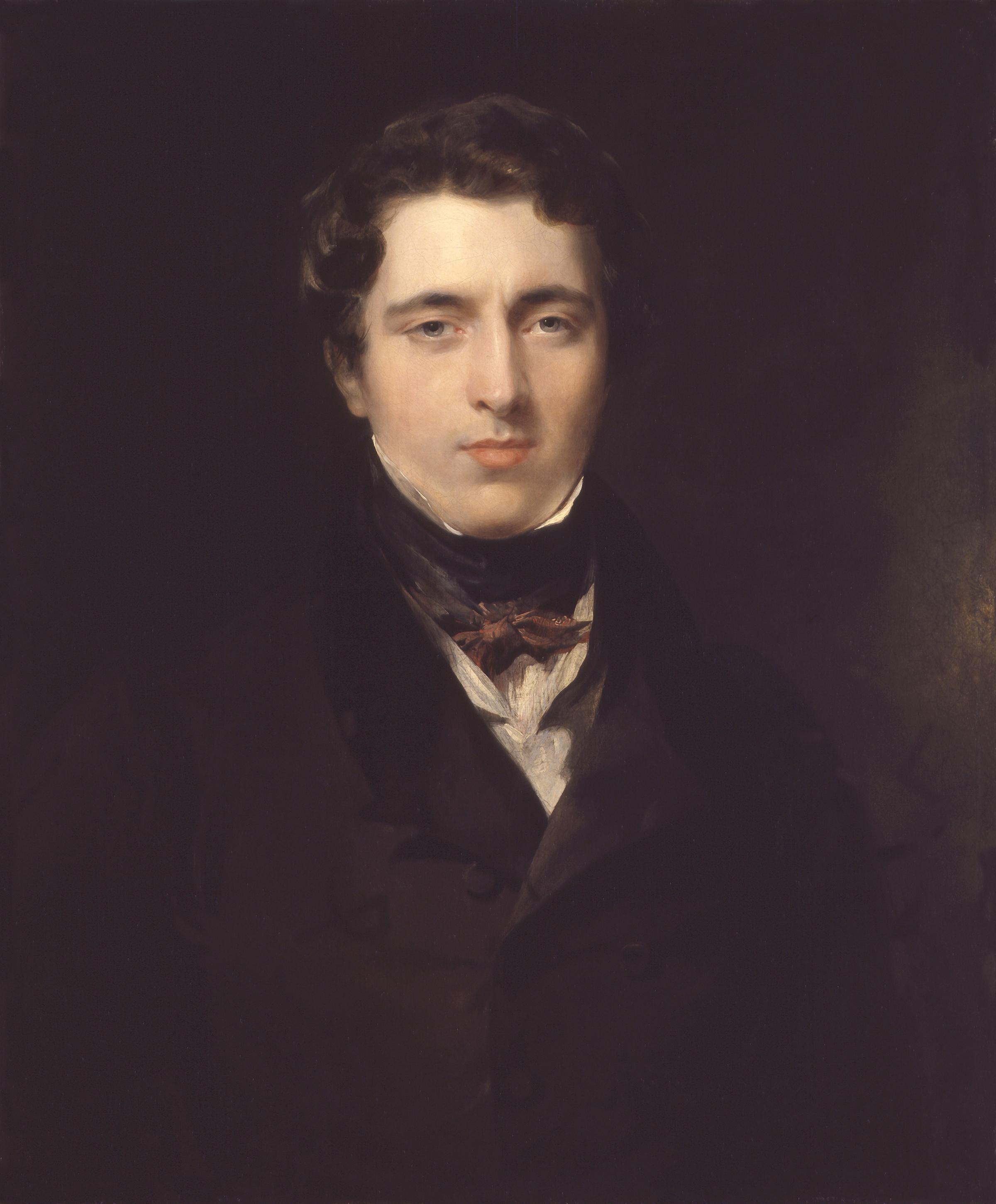
Portrait of Richard Parkes Bonington by Margaret Sarah Carpenter

The primary schools in Arnold are:

- Arnbrook Primary School
- Arnold Mill Primary and Nursery School
- Arnold View Primary School
- Arno Vale Junior School
- Burford Primary and Nursery School
- Coppice Farm Primary School
- Ernehale Infant School
- Ernehale Junior School
- Good Shepherd Primary Catholic Academy
- Killisick Junior School
- Richard Bonington Primary and Nursery School
- Robert Mellors Primary and Nursery School

There are three secondary schools in Arnold: Arnold Hill Academy, Christ the King Catholic Voluntary Academy and Redhill Academy.

Arnold has a University of the Third Age (U3A) that meets at Arnold Methodist Church.

== Transport ==
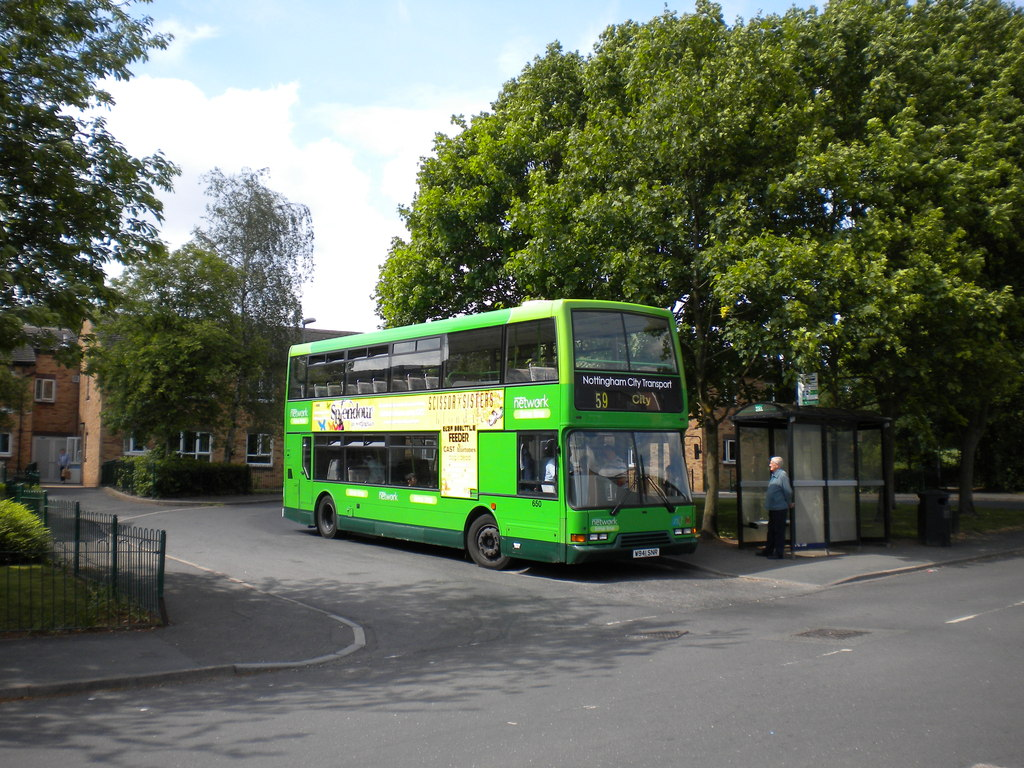
Nottingham City Transport lime line 59 bus at Killisick terminus, 2011

Nottingham City Transport operate buses to Nottingham on their lilac, lime, turqoise and purple line route branding. CT4N operate services from Bulwell to Sherwood via Arnold. Trent Barton operate services between Nottingham and Calverton (with a limited service continuing to Oxton and Epperstone), under "The Calverton" brand. Stagecoach East Midlands operate the "Sherwood Arrow" between Nottingham and Worksop or Retford, and the "Pronto" between Nottingham and Chesterfield.

== Notable people ==
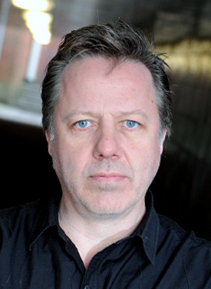
Andy Wright, music producer and songwriter

- Ruth Adam (1907–1977), feminist writer, born in Arnold.
- Alfred Anthony (1841–1900), wicket-keeper for Nottinghamshire County Cricket Club in 1875 and 1876, born in Arnold.
- George Anthony (1875–1907), nephew of the above, Nottinghamshire cricketer 1900–1905, born and died in Arnold.
- Henry Anthony (1873 or 1876 – 1928), brother of the above, Nottinghamshire cricketer 1898–1902, either born in Arnold or Old Basford.
- John Barnsdale (1878–1960), half-back for Nottingham Forest F.C. and one-time Nottinghamshire batsman and wicket-keeper, born in Arnold.
- James Bodell (c. 1831–1892), New Zealand soldier, businessman, local politician and writer, born in Arnold.
- Richard Parkes Bonington (1802–1828), landscape painter after whom the town's Bonington Theatre and Richard Bonington Primary and Nursery School are named, born at Bonington House on High Street.
- Thomas Hawksley (1807–1893), civil engineer responsible for major water and sanitary improvements in Nottingham and other parts of the United Kingdom, born at Arnot Hill House.
- Arthur Henry Knighton-Hammond (1875–1970), watercolour painter, born in Arnold.
- Andrea Lowe (born 1975 in Arnold), actress best known for roles in Coronation Street, The Tudors and Ken Loach film Route Irish.
- Tom Randall (born 1981 in Arnold), lives in Arnold and from the 2019 United Kingdom general election until the 2024 United Kingdom general election represented the town in Parliament as part of Gedling constituency.
- Alison Snowden (born 1958 in Arnold), voice actress, producer, and screenwriter.
- Joseph Whitaker (1850–1932), naturalist, born at Ramsdale Farm.
- Lisa Williamson (born 1980), children's and YA writer, grew up in Arnold.
- Andy Wright (born 1962 in Arnold), music producer and songwriter.

== See also ==
- Arnold Urban District
