= Woodthorpe, Nottinghamshire =

Suburb of Nottingham, England

Coordinates: 52.992°N 1.133°W

Woodthorpe
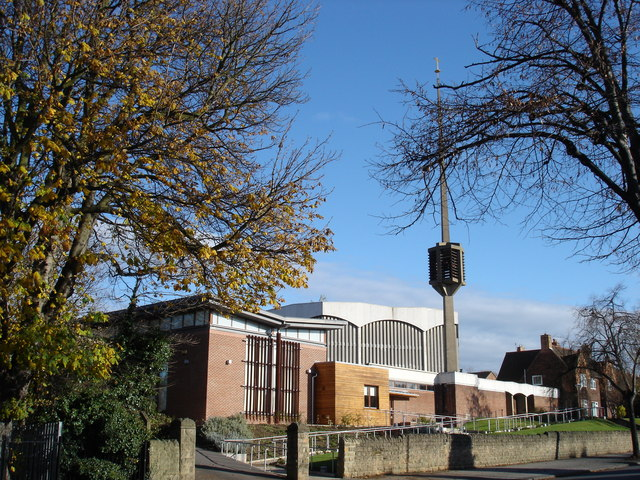
- Church of the Good Shepherd

- Location within Nottinghamshire
- OS grid reference: SK 58189 44238
- District: Borough of Gedling
- Shire county: Nottinghamshire
- Region: East Midlands
- Country: England
- Sovereign state: United Kingdom
- Post town: NOTTINGHAM
- Postcode district: NG5, NG3
- Dialling code: 0115
- Police: Nottinghamshire
- Fire: Nottinghamshire
- Ambulance: East Midlands
- UK Parliament: Gedling

Woodthorpe is part of the Borough of Gedling in Nottinghamshire, England, next to the Nottingham city boundary and the areas of Mapperley, Daybrook, Sherwood and Arnold.
