= Alfred Anthony (cricketer) =

Wicket-keeper for Nottinghamshire County Cricket Club in 1875 and 1876

Personal information
- Full name: Alfred Antony
- Born: 22 May 1841; Arnold, Nottinghamshire, England
- Died: 10 June 1900 (aged 59); Sheffield, Yorkshire, England
- Batting: Right handed
- Role: Wicket-keeper
- Relatives: George Anthony (nephew); Henry Anthony (nephew)

Domestic team information
- Years: Team
- 1875–1876: Nottinghamshire
- First-class debut: 17 May 1875 Nottinghamshire v Derbyshire
- Last First-class: 15 May 1876 Nottinghamshire v Lancashire

Career statistics
Competition	FC
Matches	3
Runs scored	14
Batting average	2.33
100s/50s	0/0
Top score	11
Balls bowled	0
Wickets	–
Bowling average	–
5 wickets in innings	–
10 wickets in match	–
Best bowling	–
Catches/stumpings	2/2
- Source: CricketArchive, 12 September 2008

Alfred Feargus O'Connor Anthony (22 May 1841 – 10 June 1900) was an English first-class cricketer. He made 3 appearances for Nottinghamshire as a wicket-keeper but, batting down the order, found runs hard to come by against Derbyshire and Yorkshire in May 1875 and, a year later, against Lancashire. He completed 2 catches and 2 stumpings. His nephews George Anthony and Henry Anthony also played for Nottinghamshire.
