= Lavish Alice =

Woman's ware brand

- Founded: 2013
- Headquarters: Manchester, UK
- Key people: Lee Bloor; Matthew Lucian

Lavish Alice is an international, contemporary womenswear brand based in Manchester, UK.

== Company overview ==
Lavish Alice was co-founded in 2013 by Lee Bloor and Matthew Lucian. In February 2019, they launched a 50-piece Spring 2019 collection at Selfridges in Exchange Square store in Manchester. and five franchise stores across the Middle East this year: three in Saudi Arabia, one in Lebanon and another in Dubai.

Lavish Alice was launched into the Chinese market in 2017 with a seven figure celebrity endorsement deal including Chinese actress and fashionista named Liu Shishi.

In 2015, Lindsay Lohan designed a clothing collection for Lavish Alice.
