= Christ the King Catholic Voluntary Academy =

School in Arnold, Nottinghamshire, England

Location
- Darlton Drive; Arnold, Nottinghamshire, NG5 7JZ; England; 53.0001°N 1.1117°W

Information
- Type: Academy
- Motto: Christus Vincit, Christus Regnat - "Christ conquers, Christ reigns"
- Religious affiliation: Roman Catholic
- Established: 1971
- Department for Education URN: 138810 Tables
- Ofsted: Reports
- Principal: Joanne Love
- Gender: Mixed
- Age: 11 to 18
- Language: English
- Houses: Iona, Canterbury, Holywell, Lindisfarne, Walsingham
- Colours: Black, Gold and White
- Affiliation: Our Lady of Lourdes Catholic Multi-Academy Trust
- Website: https://www.christtheking.notts.sch.uk/

Christ the King Catholic Voluntary Academy (formerly Christ The King School) is a mixed Roman Catholic secondary school and sixth form located in Arnold, a town in the English ceremonial county of Nottinghamshire. It is one of three Catholic secondary schools in the Greater Nottingham area, along with The Becket School and Trinity School. It was opened in 1972

== History ==
The school opened on Thursday 2 September 1971, as a secondary modern school, costing £250,000.

The official opening was on Saturday 15 July 1972, when it was announced that the school would become comprehensive from September 1973. At the opening was Bishop Edward Ellis and Anne Yates, the chairman of Nottinghamshire County Council.

Christ The King School was converted to academy status in October 2012 and was renamed Christ the King Catholic Voluntary Academy, becoming part of the Pax Christi Multi-Academy Trust. This was later merged into the Our Lady of Lourdes Multi-Academy Trust.

In 2012 the school undertook a large redevelopment of one building. In 2012, the lower building include Technology and Computer Rooms) was redecorated, and a lift was installed. In 2015 the school built a new Physical Education area, and the old PE area was converted into offices. In 2016, a new extension to the sixth form centre at Christ the King was constructed with study space for students with computer access.

== Organisation ==
The school is organised into five houses which are named after notable Christian pilgrimage sites in the UK.

- Iona
- Canterbury
- Holywell
- Lindisfarne
- Walsingham

== Curriculum ==
Christ the King Catholic Voluntary Academy offers GCSEs, BTECs and Cambridge Nationals as programmes of study for pupils, while students in the sixth form have the option to study from a range of A Levels and further BTECs.

== Notable events ==
In 2013, while on a school-organised skiing trip to Austria, teacher Jonathan Taylor died in a tragic accident after falling down a bank. The coroner later recorded a verdict of accidental death.

In January 2016, a substance in the science preparation laboratory was found to be incorrectly stored and had dried out and become explosive. Immediate professional help was obtained and the substance was destroyed by the armed forces.

== Alumni ==
- Brian Kilcline (b. 1962) - professional footballer, Notts County F.C., Coventry City F.C., Newcastle United F.C.
- MistaJam - Peter Dalton (born 1983), DJ and radio presenter
- Jordan Bowery (b. 1991) - professional footballer, Mansfield Town F.C.
- Greg Tempest (b. 1993) - professional footballer, Carlton Town F.C.
- Cieron Keane (b. 1996) - professional footballer, Ilkeston Town F.C.
- Alex Iacovitti (b. 1997) - professional footballer, Port Vale F.C.
- Grace Hodgett Young (b. 2002) - actress
